= Kids' Choice Award for Favorite Movie Actress =

American television award

The Nickelodeon Kids' Choice Awards, run annually on United States television since 1988, includes a category for "Favorite Movie Actress".

The actress with most wins is Whoopi Goldberg with 4 wins, she also won the award 2 consecutive years both times from (1988–1989) and (1992–1994).

== Winners and nominees ==
The winners are listed in bold.

| Year | Actor | Role(s) | Film |
|---|---|---|---|
**1988**; 2nd
| **1988**; 2nd | **Whoopi Goldberg** | **Detective Rita Rizzoli** | **Fatal Beauty** |
| **1988**; 2nd | Shelley Long | Lucy Chadman | Hello Again |
| **1988**; 2nd | Elisabeth Shue | Chris Parker | Adventures in Babysitting |
**1989**; 3rd
| **1989**; 3rd | **Whoopi Goldberg** | **Vashti Blue** | **The Telephone** |
| **1989**; 3rd | Bette Midler | C.C. Bloom | Beaches |
| **1989**; 3rd | Molly Ringwald | Darcy Bobrucz | For Keeps |
**1990**; 4th
| **1990**; 4th | **Lea Thompson** | **Lorraine Baines-McFly** | **Back to the Future Part II** |
| **1990**; 4th | Kim Basinger | Vicki Vale | Batman |
| **1990**; 4th | Kirstie Alley | Mollie Jensen | Look Who's Talking |
**1991**; 5th
| **1991**; 5th | **Julia Roberts** | Vivian Ward | Pretty Woman |
| **1991**; 5th | Kirstie Alley | TBA | TBA |
| **1991**; 5th | Whoopi Goldberg | TBA | TBA |
**1992**; 6th
| **1992**; 6th | **Whoopi Goldberg** | **Deloris Van Cartier** | **Sister Act** |
| **1992**; 6th | Julia Roberts | Tinker Bell | Hook |
| **1992**; 6th | Michelle Pfeiffer | Selina Kyle / Catwoman | Batman Returns |
**1994**; 7th
| **1994**; 7th | **Whoopi Goldberg** | **Deloris Van Cartier / Sister Mary Clarence and Sarah Mathews** | **Sister Act II and Made in America** |
| **1994**; 7th | Bette Midler | Winifred "Winnie" Sanderson | Hocus Pocus |
| **1994**; 7th | Lori Petty | Rae Lindley | Free Willy |
**1995**; 8th
| **1995**; 8th | **Rosie O'Donnell** | **Betty Rubble** | **The Flintstones** |
| **1995**; 8th | Sally Field | Mrs. Gump | Forrest Gump |
| **1995**; 8th | Sandra Bullock | Annie Porter | Speed |
**1996**; 9th
| **1996**; 9th | **Mary-Kate & Ashley Olsen** | **Amanda Lemmon & Alyssa Callaway** | **It Takes Two** |
| **1996**; 9th | Kirstie Alley | Diane Burrows | It Takes Two |
| **1996**; 9th | Nicole Kidman | Dr. Chase Meridian | Batman Forever |
| **1996**; 9th | Alicia Silverstone | Cher Horowitz | Clueless |
**1997**; 10th
| **1997**; 10th | **Rosie O'Donnell** | Katherine "Ole Golly | Harriet the Spy |
| **1997**; 10th | Whoopi Goldberg | Eddie Franklin | Eddie |
| **1997**; 10th | Whitney Houston | Julia Biggs | The Preacher's Wife |
| **1997**; 10th | Michelle Pfeiffer | Melanie Parker | One Fine Day |
**1998**; 11th
| **1998**; 11th | **Alicia Silverstone** | **Barbara Wilson / Batgirl** | **Batman & Robin** |
| **1998**; 11th | Beverly D'Angelo | Ellen Griswold | Vegas Vacation |
| **1998**; 11th | Christina Ricci | Patti Randall | That Darn Cat |
| **1998**; 11th | Uma Thurman | Dr. Pamela Isley / Poison Ivy | Batman & Robin |
**1999**; 12th
| **1999**; 12th | **Drew Barrymore** | **Julia Sullivan and Danielle de Barbarac** | **The Wedding Singer and Ever After** |
| **1999**; 12th | Julia Roberts | Isabel Kelly | Stepmom |
| **1999**; 12th | Meg Ryan | Kathleen "Shopgirl" Kelly | You've Got Mail |
| **1999**; 12th | Spice Girls | Themselves | Spice World |
**2000**; 13th
| **2000**; 13th | **Melissa Joan Hart** | **Nicole Maris** | **Drive Me Crazy** |
| **2000**; 13th | Drew Barrymore | Josie Geller | Never Been Kissed |
| **2000**; 13th | Sandra Bullock | Sarah Lewis | Forces of Nature |
| **2000**; 13th | Julia Roberts | Anna Scott and Maggie Carpenter | Notting Hill and Runaway Bride |
**2001**; 14th
| **2001**; 14th | **Drew Barrymore** | Dylan Sanders | **Charlie's Angels** |
| **2001**; 14th | Halle Berry | Storm | X-Men |
| **2001**; 14th | Cameron Diaz | Natalie Cook | Charlie's Angels |
| **2001**; 14th | Janet Jackson | Denise Gaines | Nutty Professor II: The Klumps |
**2002**; 15th
| **2002**; 15th | **Jennifer Lopez** | **Mary Fiore** | **The Wedding Planner** |
| **2002**; 15th | Julie Andrews | Queen Clarisse Renaldi | The Princess Diaries |
| **2002**; 15th | Raven-Symoné | Charisse Dolittle | Dr. Dolittle 2 |
| **2002**; 15th | Reese Witherspoon | Elle Woods | Legally Blonde |
**2003**; 16th
| **2003**; 16th | **Amanda Bynes** | **Kaylee** | **Big Fat Liar** |
| **2003**; 16th | Halle Berry | Giacinta 'Jinx' Johnson | Die Another Day |
| **2003**; 16th | Kirsten Dunst | Mary Jane Watson | Spider-Man |
| **2003**; 16th | Jennifer Lopez | Marisa Ventura | Maid in Manhattan |
**2004**; 17th
| **2004**; 17th | **Amanda Bynes** | **Daphne Reynolds** | **What a Girl Wants** |
| **2004**; 17th | Halle Berry | Ororo Munroe/Storm | X2: X-Men United |
| **2004**; 17th | Cameron Diaz | Natalie Cook | Charlie's Angels: Full Throttle |
| **2004**; 17th | Queen Latifah | Charlene Morton | Bringing Down the House |
**2005**; 18th
| **2005**; 18th | **Hilary Duff** | **Samantha "Sam" Montgomery** | **A Cinderella Story** |
| **2005**; 18th | Drew Barrymore | Lucy Whitmore | 50 First Dates |
| **2005**; 18th | Halle Berry | Patience Phillips / Catwoman | Catwoman |
| **2005**; 18th | Lindsay Lohan | Cady Heron | Mean Girls |
**2006**; 19th
| **2006**; 19th | **Lindsay Lohan** | **Margaret "Maggie" Peyton** | **Herbie: Fully Loaded** |
| **2006**; 19th | Jessica Alba | Sue Storm / Invisible Woman | Fantastic Four |
| **2006**; 19th | Drew Barrymore | Lindsey Meeks | Fever Pitch |
| **2006**; 19th | Dakota Fanning | Cale Crane | Dreamer |
**2007**; 20th
| **2007**; 20th | **Dakota Fanning** | **Fern Arable** | **Charlotte's Web** |
| **2007**; 20th | Halle Berry | Ororo Munroe/Storm | X-Men: The Last Stand |
| **2007**; 20th | Keira Knightley | Elizabeth Swann | Pirates of the Caribbean: Dead Man's Chest |
| **2007**; 20th | Sarah Jessica Parker | Paula | Failure to Launch |
**2008**; 21st
| **2008**; 21st | **Jessica Alba** | **Sue Storm / Invisible Woman** | **Fantastic Four: Rise of the Silver Surfer** |
| **2008**; 21st | Drew Barrymore | Sophie Fisher | Music and Lyrics |
| **2008**; 21st | Kirsten Dunst | Mary Jane "M.J." Watson | Spider-Man 3 |
| **2008**; 21st | Keira Knightley | Elizabeth Swann | Pirates of the Caribbean: At World's End |
**2009**; 22nd
| **2009**; 22nd | **Vanessa Hudgens** | **Gabriella Montez** | **High School Musical 3: Senior Year** |
| **2009**; 22nd | Jennifer Aniston | Jennifer "Jenny" Grogan | Marley & Me |
| **2009**; 22nd | Anne Hathaway | Agent 99 | Get Smart |
| **2009**; 22nd | Reese Witherspoon | Kate | Four Christmases |
**2010**; 23rd
| **2010**; 23rd | **Miley Cyrus** | **Miley Stewart / Hannah Montana** | **Hannah Montana: The Movie** |
| **2010**; 23rd | Sandra Bullock | Leigh Anne Tuohy | The Blind Side |
| **2010**; 23rd | Megan Fox | Mikaela Banes | Transformers: Revenge of the Fallen |
| **2010**; 23rd | Zoe Saldaña | Neytiri | Avatar |
**2011**; 24th
| **2011**; 24th | **Miley Cyrus** | **Veronica "Ronnie" Miller** | **The Last Song** |
| **2011**; 24th | Ashley Judd | Carly Harris | Tooth Fairy |
| **2011**; 24th | Kristen Stewart | Bella Swan | The Twilight Saga: Eclipse |
| **2011**; 24th | Emma Watson | Hermione Granger | Harry Potter and the Deathly Hallows – Part 1 |
**2012**; 25th
| **2012**; 25th | **Kristen Stewart** | **Bella Swan** | **The Twilight Saga: Breaking Dawn – Part 1** |
| **2012**; 25th | Amy Adams | Mary | The Muppets |
| **2012**; 25th | Sofia Vergara | Odile | The Smurfs |
| **2012**; 25th | Emma Watson | Hermione Granger | Harry Potter and the Deathly Hallows – Part 2 |
**2013**; 26th
| **2013**; 26th | **Kristen Stewart** | **Bella Swan** | **The Twilight Saga: Breaking Dawn – Part 2** |
| **2013**; 26th | Vanessa Hudgens | Kailani Laguatan | Journey 2: The Mysterious Island |
| **2013**; 26th | Scarlett Johansson | Natasha Romanoff / Black Widow | The Avengers |
| **2013**; 26th | Jennifer Lawrence | Katniss Everdeen | The Hunger Games |
**2014**; 27th
| **2014**; 27th | **Jennifer Lawrence** | **Katniss Everdeen** | **The Hunger Games: Catching Fire** |
| **2014**; 27th | Sandra Bullock | Dr. Ryan Stone | Gravity |
| **2014**; 27th | Mila Kunis | Theodora | Oz the Great and Powerful |
| **2014**; 27th | Jayma Mays | Grace Winslow | The Smurfs 2 |
**2015**; 28th
| **2015**; 28th | **Emma Stone** | **Gwendolyn "Gwen" Stacy** | **The Amazing Spider-Man 2** |
| **2015**; 28th | Cameron Diaz | Miss Colleen Hannigan | Annie |
| **2015**; 28th | Elle Fanning | Princess Aurora | Maleficent |
| **2015**; 28th | Megan Fox | April O'Neil | Teenage Mutant Ninja Turtles |
| **2015**; 28th | Jennifer Garner | Kelly Cooper | Alexander and the Terrible, Horrible, No Good, Very Bad Day |
| **2015**; 28th | Angelina Jolie | Maleficent | Maleficent |
**2016**; 29th
| **2016**; 29th | **Jennifer Lawrence** | **Katniss Everdeen** | **The Hunger Games: Mockingjay – Part 2** |
| **2016**; 29th | Lily James | Cinderella | Cinderella |
| **2016**; 29th | Scarlett Johansson | Natasha Romanoff / Black Widow | Avengers: Age of Ultron |
| **2016**; 29th | Anna Kendrick | Beca Mitchel | Pitch Perfect 2 |
| **2016**; 29th | Daisy Ridley | Rey | Star Wars: The Force Awakens |
| **2016**; 29th | Rebel Wilson | Patricia "Fat Amy" | Pitch Perfect 2 |
**2017**; 30th
| **2017**; 30th | **Melissa McCarthy** | **Dr. Abigail "Abby" Yates** | **Ghostbusters** |
| **2017**; 30th | Amy Adams | Lois Lane | Batman v Superman: Dawn of Justice |
| **2017**; 30th | Megan Fox | April O'Neil | Teenage Mutant Ninja Turtles: Out of the Shadows |
| **2017**; 30th | Scarlett Johansson | Natasha Romanoff / Black Widow | Captain America: Civil War |
| **2017**; 30th | Felicity Jones | Jyn Erso | Rogue One: A Star Wars Story |
| **2017**; 30th | Kristen Wiig | Dr. Erin Gilbert | Ghostbusters |
**2018**; 31st
| **2018**; 31st | **Zendaya** | **Michelle and Anne Wheeler** | **Spider-Man: Homecoming and The Greatest Showman** |
| **2018**; 31st | Gal Gadot | Diana Prince / Wonder Woman | Wonder Woman and Justice League |
| **2018**; 31st | Anna Kendrick | Beca Mitchel | Pitch Perfect 3 |
| **2018**; 31st | Daisy Ridley | Rey | Star Wars: The Last Jedi |
| **2018**; 31st | Zoe Saldaña | Gamora | Guardians of the Galaxy Vol. 2 |
| **2018**; 31st | Emma Watson | Belle | Beauty and the Beast |
**2019**; 32nd
| **2019**; 32nd | **Joey King** | **Elle Evans** | **The Kissing Booth** |
| **2019**; 32nd | Emily Blunt | Mary Poppins | Mary Poppins Returns |
| **2019**; 32nd | Scarlett Johansson | Natasha Romanoff / Black Widow | Avengers: Infinity War |
| **2019**; 32nd | Lupita Nyong'o | Nakia | Black Panther |
| **2019**; 32nd | Rihanna | Nine Ball | Ocean's 8 |
| **2019**; 32nd | Zoe Saldaña | Gamora | Avengers: Infinity War |
**2020**; 33rd
| **2020**; 33rd | **Dove Cameron** | **Mal** | **Descendants 3** |
| **2020**; 33rd | Scarlett Johansson | Natasha Romanoff / Black Widow | Avengers: Endgame |
| **2020**; 33rd | Angelina Jolie | Maleficent | Maleficent: Mistress of Evil |
| **2020**; 33rd | Brie Larson | Carol Danvers / Captain Marvel | Avengers: Endgame and Captain Marvel |
| **2020**; 33rd | Taylor Swift | Bombalurina | Cats |
| **2020**; 33rd | Zendaya | MJ | Spider-Man: Far From Home |
**2021**; 34th
| **2021**; 34th | **Millie Bobby Brown** | **Enola Holmes** | **Enola Holmes** |
| **2021**; 34th | Gal Gadot | Diana Prince / Wonder Woman | Wonder Woman 1984 |
| **2021**; 34th | Anne Hathaway | Grand High Witch | The Witches |
| **2021**; 34th | Vanessa Hudgens | Princesses | The Princess Switch: Switched Again |
| **2021**; 34th | Yifei Liu | Mulan | Mulan |
| **2021**; 34th | Melissa McCarthy | Carol Peters | Superintelligence |
**2022**; 35th
| **2022**; 35th | **Zendaya** | **MJ and Chani** | **Spider-Man: No Way Home and Dune** |
| **2022**; 35th | Emily Blunt | Lily Houghton | Jungle Cruise |
| **2022**; 35th | Camila Cabello | Cinderella | Cinderella |
| **2022**; 35th | Scarlett Johansson | Natasha Romanoff / Black Widow | Black Widow |
| **2022**; 35th | Angelina Jolie | Thena | Eternals |
| **2022**; 35th | Emma Stone | Estella / Cruella | Cruella |
**2023**; 36th
| **2023**; 36th | **Millie Bobby Brown** | **Enola Holmes** | **Enola Holmes 2** |
| **2023**; 36th | Lupita Nyong'o | Nakia | Black Panther: Wakanda Forever |
| **2023**; 36th | Elizabeth Olsen | Wanda Maximoff / The Scarlet Witch | Doctor Strange in the Multiverse of Madness |
| **2023**; 36th | Sarah Jessica Parker | Sarah Sanderson | Hocus Pocus 2 |
| **2023**; 36th | Natalie Portman | Jane Foster / The Mighty Thor | Thor: Love and Thunder |
| **2023**; 36th | Letitia Wright | Shuri | Black Panther: Wakanda Forever |
**2024**; 37th
| **2024**; 37th | **Margot Robbie** | **Barbie** | **Barbie** |
| **2024**; 37th | America Ferrera | Gloria | Barbie |
| **2024**; 37th | Brie Larson | Carol Danvers/Captain Marvel | The Marvels |
| **2024**; 37th | Halle Bailey | Ariel | The Little Mermaid |
| **2024**; 37th | Jennifer Garner | Jess | Family Switch |
| **2024**; 37th | Melissa McCarthy | Ursula | The Little Mermaid |
| **2024**; 37th | Zendaya | Chani | Dune: Part Two |
| **2024**; 37th | Zoe Saldaña | Gamora | Guardians of the Galaxy Vol. 3 |
**2025**; 38th
| **2025**; 38th | **Ariana Grande** | **Glinda** | **Wicked** |
| **2025**; 38th | Cynthia Erivo | Elphaba | Wicked |
| **2025**; 38th | Emma Myers | Natalie | A Minecraft Movie |
| **2025**; 38th | Jenna Ortega | Astrid Deetz | Beetlejuice Beetlejuice |
| **2025**; 38th | Millie Bobby Brown | Michelle Greene | The Electric State |
| **2025**; 38th | Winona Ryder | Lydia Deetz | Beetlejuice Beetlejuice |
**2026**; 39th
| **2026**; 39th | **Zendaya** | **MJ** | **Spider-Man: Brand New Day** |
| **2026**; 39th | Anne Hathaway | Andy Sachs | The Devil Wears Prada 2 |
| **2026**; 39th | Ariana Grande | Glinda | Wicked: For Good |
| **2026**; 39th | Catherine Laga'aia | Moana | Moana |
| **2026**; 39th | Cynthia Erivo | Elphaba | Wicked: For Good |
| **2026**; 39th | Millie Bobby Brown | Enola Holmes | Enola Holmes 3 |
| **2026**; 39th | Scarlett Johansson | Zora Bennett | Jurassic World Rebirth |
| **2026**; 39th | Zoe Saldaña | Neytiri | Avatar: Fire and Ash |

== Most wins ==
4 wins

- Whoopi Goldberg (2 consecutives)

3 wins

- Zendaya

2 wins

- Drew Barrymore
- Millie Bobby Brown
- Amanda Bynes (2 consecutive)
- Miley Cyrus (2 consecutive)
- Jennifer Lawrence
- Rosie O'Donnell
- Kristen Stewart (2 consecutive)

== Most nominations ==
6 nominations

- Drew Barrymore
- Whoopi Goldberg
- Scarlett Johansson

5 nominations

- Halle Berry
- Zoe Saldaña

4 nominations

- Millie Bobby Brown
- Sandra Bullock
- Julia Roberts
- Zendaya

3 nominations

- Cameron Diaz
- Megan Fox
- Anne Hathaway
- Angelina Jolie
- Jennifer Lawrence
- Melissa McCarthy
- Kristen Stewart
- Emma Watson

2 nominations

- Amy Adams
- Jessica Alba
- Kim Basinger
- Emily Blunt
- Amanda Bynes
- Miley Cyrus
- Kirsten Dunst
- Cynthia Erivo
- Dakota Fanning
- Gal Gadot
- Ariana Grande
- Vanessa Hudgens
- Anna Kendrick
- Keira Knightley
- Brie Larson
- Jennifer Lopez
- Bette Midler
- Lupita Nyong'o
- Rosie O'Donnell
- Sarah Jessica Parker
- Michelle Pfeiffer
- Daisy Ridley
- Alicia Silverstone
- Emma Stone
- Reese Witherspoon
