= 2005 Kids' Choice Awards =

Children's television awards show program broadcast in 2005

- Date: April 2, 2005
- Location: Pauley Pavilion
- Hosted by: Ben Stiller

Highlights
- Most awards: Usher (2)
- Most nominations: Shrek 2 (4)

Television/radio coverage
- Network: Nickelodeon
- Runtime: 120 minutes
- Viewership: 5.18 million
- Produced by: Paul Flattery
- Directed by: Bruce Gowers

The 18th Annual Nickelodeon Kids' Choice Awards was held on April 2, 2005. The event was hosted by Ben Stiller and was held at Pauley Pavilion in Los Angeles.

== Performers ==
- Will Smith - "Switch"
- Simple Plan - "Shut Up!"

== Presenters ==
- Cameron Diaz and Jimmy Fallon - Presented Favorite Movie Actor
- Frankie Muniz and Jessica Alba - Presented Favorite TV Show
- Jesse McCartney and Jamie Lynn Spears - Presented Favorite Cartoon
- George Lopez and Alyssa Milano - Presented Favorite TV Actor
- Hayden Christensen, C-3PO, Darth Vader, Chewbacca and R2-D2 - Presented Favorite Male Singer
- Drake Bell, Josh Peck and Ice Cube - Presented Favorite TV Actress
- Halle Berry - Presented the Wannabe Award
- Adam Brody and Amber Tamblyn - Presented Favorite Movie Actress
- Amanda Bynes and Devon Werkheiser - Introduced Simple Plan
- Chris Rock and Jada Pinkett Smith - Presented Favorite Voice from an Animated Movie

== Winners and nominees ==
Winners are listed first, in bold. Other nominees are in alphabetical order.

=== Movies ===
Favorite Movie	Favorite Movie Actor
**The Incredibles**; Harry Potter and the Prisoner of Azkaban; Shrek 2; Spider-Man 2	**Adam Sandler** – 50 First Dates as Henry Roth; Tim Allen – Christmas with the Kranks as Luther Krank; Jim Carrey – Lemony Snicket's A Series of Unfortunate Events as Count Olaf; Tobey Maguire – Spider-Man 2 as Peter Parker / Spider-Man
Favorite Movie Actress	Favorite Voice From an Animated Movie
**Hilary Duff** – A Cinderella Story as Samantha "Sam" Montgomery; Drew Barrymore – 50 First Dates as Lucy Whitmore; Halle Berry – Catwoman as Patience Phillips / Catwoman; Lindsay Lohan – Mean Girls as Cady Heron	**Will Smith** – Shark Tale as Oscar; Cameron Diaz – Shrek 2 as Princess Fiona; Eddie Murphy – Shrek 2 as Donkey; Mike Myers – Shrek 2 as Shrek

=== Television ===
Favorite TV Show	Favorite TV Actor
**American Idol**; Drake & Josh; Fear Factor; Lizzie McGuire	**Romeo** – Romeo! as Romeo "Ro" Miller; Ashton Kutcher – That '70s Show as Michael Kelso; Bernie Mac – The Bernie Mac Show as Bernard "Bernie" McCullough; Frankie Muniz – Malcolm in the Middle as Malcolm
Favorite TV Actress	Favorite Cartoon
**Raven** – That's So Raven as Raven Baxter; Hilary Duff – Lizzie McGuire as Elizabeth "Lizzie" McGuire; Eve – Eve as Shelly Williams; Alyssa Milano – Charmed as Phoebe Halliwell	**SpongeBob SquarePants**; Ed, Edd n Eddy; The Fairly OddParents; The Simpsons

=== Music ===
Favorite Male Singer	Favorite Female Singer
**Usher**; Chingy; LL Cool J; Nelly	**Avril Lavigne**; Beyoncé; Hilary Duff; Alicia Keys
Favorite Music Group	Favorite Song
**Green Day**; The Black Eyed Peas; Destiny's Child; Outkast	**"Burn"** – Usher; "Lose My Breath" – Destiny's Child; "My Boo" – Usher ft. Alicia Keys; "Toxic" – Britney Spears

=== Miscellaneous ===
Favorite Athlete	Favorite Book
**Tony Hawk**; Mia Hamm; Shaquille O'Neal; Alex Rodriguez	**A Series of Unfortunate Events**; Harry Potter series; Holes; A Wrinkle in Time
Favorite Video Game
**Shrek 2**; Scooby-Doo 2: Monsters Unleashed; Shark Tale; Spider-Man 2

=== Wannabe Award ===
- Queen Latifah
