= Kids' Choice Award for Favorite Male TV Star =

American television award

The Nickelodeon Kids' Choice Awards, run annually on United States television since 1988, includes a category for Favorite Male TV Star".

== Winners and nominees ==
The winners are listed in bold.

Year	Actor	Role(s)	Television Program	Ref.
**1988**; 2nd
**1988**; 2nd	**Michael J. Fox**	**Alex P. Keaton**	**Family Ties**	
**1988**; 2nd	Kirk Cameron	Mike Seaver	Growing Pains	
**1988**; 2nd	Bill Cosby	Cliff Huxtable	The Cosby Show	
**1989**; 3rd
**1989**; 3rd	**ALF**	**ALF**	**ALF**	
**1989**; 3rd	Kirk Cameron	Mike Seaver	Growing Pains	
**1989**; 3rd	Michael J. Fox	Alex P. Keaton	Family Ties	
**1990**; 4th
**1990**; 4th	**Kirk Cameron**	**Michael Aaron "Mike" Seaver**	**Growing Pains**	
**1990**; 4th	Fred Savage	Kevin Arnold	The Wonder Years	
**1990**; 4th	Johnny Depp	Officer Thomas "Tom" Hanson	21 Jump Street	
**1991**; 5th
**1991**; 5th	**Will Smith**	**Will Smith**	**The Fresh Prince of Bel-Air**	
**1991**; 5th	Bill Cosby	Cliff Huxtable	The Cosby Show	
**1991**; 5th	Kirk Cameron	Mike Seaver	Growing Pains	
**1992**; 6th
**1992**; 6th	**Bill Cosby**	**Dr. Heathcliff "Cliff" Huxtable**	**The Cosby Show**	
**1992**; 6th	Luke Perry	Dylan McKay	Beverly Hills, 90210	
**1992**; 6th	Will Smith	Will Smith	The Fresh Prince of Bel-Air	
**1994**; 7th
**1994**; 7th	**Tim Allen**	**Timothy "Tim" Taylor**	**Home Improvement**	
**1994**; 7th	Martin Lawrence	Martin Payne	Martin	
**1994**; 7th	Will Smith	Will Smith	The Fresh Prince of Bel-Air	
**1995**; 8th
**1995**; 8th	**Tim Allen**	**Timothy "Tim" Taylor**	**Home Improvement**	
**1995**; 8th	Martin Lawrence	Martin Payne	Martin	
**1995**; 8th	Sinbad	David Bryan	The Sinbad Show	
**1996**; 9th
**1996**; 9th	**Tim Allen**	**Tim Taylor**	**Home Improvement**	
**1996**; 9th	Martin Lawrence	Martin Payne	Martin	
**1996**; 9th	Will Smith	Will Smith	The Fresh Prince of Bel-Air	
**1996**; 9th	Jaleel White	Steve Urkel	Family Matters	
**1997**; 10th
**1997**; 10th	**Tim Allen**	**Tim Taylor**	**Home Improvement**	
**1997**; 10th	Michael J. Fox	Mike Flaherty	Spin City	
**1997**; 10th	LL Cool J	Marion Hill	In the House	
**1997**; 10th	Jonathan Taylor Thomas	Randy Taylor	Home Improvement	
**1998**; 11th
**1998**; 11th	**Jonathan Taylor Thomas**	**Randy Taylor**	**Home Improvement**	
**1998**; 11th	Tim Allen	Tim Taylor	Home Improvement	
**1998**; 11th	Kenan Thompson and Kel Mitchell	Kenan Rockmore and Kel Kimble	Kenan & Kel	
**1998**; 11th	Marlon and Shawn Wayans	Marlon and Shawn Williams	The Wayans Bros.	
**1999**; 12th
**1999**; 12th	**Kel Mitchell**	**Kel Kimble**	**Kenan & Kel**	
**1999**; 12th	Tim Allen	Tim Taylor	Home Improvement	
**1999**; 12th	Drew Carey	Drew Carey	The Drew Carey Show	
**1999**; 12th	Jonathan Taylor Thomas	Randy Taylor	Home Improvement	
**2000**; 13th
**2000**; 13th	**Kenan Thompson**	**Various Characters**	**All That**	
**2000**; 13th	Drew Carey	Drew Carey	The Drew Carey Show	
**2000**; 13th	Michael J. Fox	Mike Flaherty	Spin City	
**2000**; 13th	Jamie Foxx	Jamie King	The Jamie Foxx Show	
**2001**; 14th
**2001**; 14th	**Carson Daly**	**Himself**	**Total Request Live**	
**2001**; 14th	Nick Cannon	Various Characters	All That	
**2001**; 14th	Drew Carey	Drew Carey	The Drew Carey Show	
**2001**; 14th	Jamie Foxx	Jamie King	The Jamie Foxx Show	
**2002**; 15th
**2002**; 15th	**Nick Cannon**	**Himself**	**The Nick Cannon Show**	
**2002**; 15th	Matt LeBlanc	Joey Tribbiani	Friends	
**2002**; 15th	Frankie Muniz	Malcolm	Malcolm in the Middle	
**2002**; 15th	Matthew Perry	Chandler Bing	Friends	
**2003**; 16th
**2003**; 16th	**Frankie Muniz**	**Malcolm**	**Malcolm in the Middle**	
**2003**; 16th	Nick Cannon	Himself	The Nick Cannon Show	
**2003**; 16th	Adam Lamberg	David "Gordo" Gordon	Lizzie McGuire	
**2003**; 16th	Bernie Mac	Bernie McCullough	The Bernie Mac Show	
**2004**; 17th
**2004**; 17th	**Frankie Muniz**	**Malcolm**	**Malcolm in the Middle**	
**2004**; 17th	Ashton Kutcher	Michael Kelso	That '70s Show	
**2004**; 17th	Lil' Romeo	Romeo Miller	Romeo!	
**2004**; 17th	Bernie Mac	Bernie McCullough	The Bernie Mac Show	
**2005**; 18th
**2005**; 18th	**Romeo**	**Romeo Miller**	**Romeo!**	
**2005**; 18th	Ashton Kutcher	Michael Kelso	That '70s Show	
**2005**; 18th	Bernie Mac	Bernie McCullough	The Bernie Mac Show	
**2005**; 18th	Frankie Muniz	Malcolm	Malcolm in the Middle	
**2006**; 19th
**2006**; 19th	**Drake Bell**	**Drake Parker**	**Drake & Josh**	
**2006**; 19th	Ashton Kutcher	Michael Kelso	That '70s Show	
**2006**; 19th	Bernie Mac	Bernie McCullough	The Bernie Mac Show	
**2006**; 19th	Romeo	Romeo Miller	Romeo!	
**2007**; 20th
**2007**; 20th	**Drake Bell**	**Drake Parker**	**Drake & Josh**	
**2007**; 20th	Jason Lee	Earl Hickey	My Name Is Earl	
**2007**; 20th	Charlie Sheen	Charlie Harper	Two and a Half Men	
**2007**; 20th	Cole Sprouse	Cody Martin	The Suite Life of Zack & Cody	
**2008**; 21st
**2008**; 21st	**Drake Bell**	**Drake Parker**	**Drake & Josh**	
**2008**; 21st	Josh Peck	Josh Nichols	Drake & Josh	
**2008**; 21st	Cole Sprouse	Cody Martin	The Suite Life of Zack & Cody	
**2008**; 21st	Dylan Sprouse	Zack Martin	The Suite Life of Zack & Cody	
**2009**; 22nd
**2009**; 22nd	**Dylan Sprouse**	**Zack Martin**	**The Suite Life of Zack & Cody**	
**2009**; 22nd	Jason Lee	Earl Hickey	My Name Is Earl	
**2009**; 22nd	Cole Sprouse	Cody Martin	The Suite Life of Zack & Cody	
**2009**; 22nd	Nat Wolff	Nat	The Naked Brothers Band	
**2010**; 23rd
**2010**; 23rd	**Dylan Sprouse**	**Zack Martin**	**The Suite Life on Deck**	
**2010**; 23rd	Joe Jonas	Joe Lucas	Jonas	
**2010**; 23rd	Nick Jonas	Nick Lucas	Jonas	
**2010**; 23rd	Cole Sprouse	Cody Martin	The Suite Life on Deck	
**2011**; 24th
**2011**; 24th	**Dylan Sprouse**	**Zack Martin**	**The Suite Life on Deck**	
**2011**; 24th	Joe Jonas	Joe Lucas	Jonas	
**2011**; 24th	Nick Jonas	Nick Lucas	Jonas	
**2011**; 24th	Cole Sprouse	Cody Martin	The Suite Life on Deck	
**2012**; 25th
**2012**; 25th	**Jake Short**	**Fletcher Quimby**	**A.N.T. Farm**	
**2012**; 25th	Tim Allen	Mike Baxter	Last Man Standing	
**2012**; 25th	Ty Burrell	Phil Dunphy	Modern Family	
**2012**; 25th	Alex Heartman	Jayden Shiba/Red Samurai Ranger	Power Rangers Samurai	
**2013**; 26th
**2013**; 26th	**Ross Lynch**	**Austin Moon**	**Austin & Ally**	
**2013**; 26th	Jake T. Austin	Max Russo	Wizards of Waverly Place	
**2013**; 26th	Lucas Cruikshank	Marvin Forman	Marvin Marvin	
**2013**; 26th	Carlos Pena Jr.	Carlos Garcia	Big Time Rush	
**2014**; 27th
**2014**; 27th	**Ross Lynch**	**Austin Moon**	**Austin & Ally**	
**2014**; 27th	Benjamin Flores Jr.	Louie Preston	The Haunted Hathaways	
**2014**; 27th	Jack Griffo	Max Thunderman	The Thundermans	
**2014**; 27th	Jake Short	Fletcher Quimby	A.N.T. Farm	
**2015**; 28th
**2015**; 28th	**Ross Lynch**	**Austin Moon**	**Austin & Ally**	
**2015**; 28th	Benjamin Flores Jr.	Louie Preston	The Haunted Hathaways	
**2015**; 28th	Jack Griffo	Max Thunderman	The Thundermans	
**2015**; 28th	Grant Gustin	Barry Allen/The Flash	The Flash	
**2015**; 28th	Charlie McDermott	Axl Heck	The Middle	
**2015**; 28th	Jim Parsons	Sheldon Cooper	The Big Bang Theory	
**2016**; 29th	Favorite Male TV Star – Kids Show			
**2016**; 29th	**Ross Lynch**	**Austin Moon**	**Austin & Ally**	
**2016**; 29th	Aidan Gallagher	Nicky Harper	Nicky, Ricky, Dicky & Dawn	
**2016**; 29th	Jack Griffo	Max Thunderman	The Thundermans	
**2016**; 29th	Jace Norman	Henry Hart / Kid Danger	Henry Danger	
**2016**; 29th	Casey Simpson	Ricky Harper	Nicky, Ricky, Dicky & Dawn	
**2016**; 29th	Tyrel Jackson Williams	Leo Dooley	Lab Rats: Bionic Island	
**2016**; 29th	Favorite Male TV Star – Family Show			
**2016**; 29th	**Jim Parsons**	**Sheldon Cooper**	**The Big Bang Theory**	
**2016**; 29th	Anthony Anderson	Dre Johnson	Black-ish	
**2016**; 29th	Johnny Galecki	Leonard Hofstadter	The Big Bang Theory	
**2016**; 29th	Grant Gustin	Barry Allen/The Flash	The Flash	
**2016**; 29th	Ben McKenzie	James Gordon	Gotham	
**2016**; 29th	Rico Rodriguez	Manny Delgado	Modern Family	
**2017**; 30th
**2017**; 30th	**Jace Norman**	**Henry Hart / Kid Danger**	**Henry Danger**	
**2017**; 30th	Benjamin Flores Jr.	Triple G	Game Shakers	
**2017**; 30th	Aidan Gallagher	Nicky Harper	Nicky, Ricky, Dicky & Dawn	
**2017**; 30th	Jack Griffo	Max Thunderman	The Thundermans	
**2017**; 30th	Casey Simpson	Ricky Harper	Nicky, Ricky, Dicky & Dawn	
**2017**; 30th	Tyrel Jackson Williams	Leo Dooley	Lab Rats	
**2018**; 31st
**2018**; 31st	**Jace Norman**	**Henry Hart / Kid Danger**	**Henry Danger**	
**2018**; 31st	Jack Griffo	Max Thunderman	The Thundermans	
**2018**; 31st	Grant Gustin	Barry Allen/The Flash	The Flash	
**2018**; 31st	Andrew Lincoln	Rick Grimes	The Walking Dead	
**2018**; 31st	Jim Parsons	Sheldon Cooper	The Big Bang Theory	
**2018**; 31st	William Shewfelt	Brody Romero/Red Ninja Steel Ranger	Power Rangers Ninja Steel	
**2019**; 32nd
**2019**; 32nd	**Jace Norman**	**Henry Hart / Kid Danger**	**Henry Danger**	
**2019**; 32nd	Karan Brar	Ravi Ross	Bunk'd	
**2019**; 32nd	Grant Gustin	Barry Allen / The Flash	The Flash	
**2019**; 32nd	Neil Patrick Harris	Count Olaf	A Series of Unfortunate Events	
**2019**; 32nd	Caleb McLaughlin	Lucas Sinclair	Stranger Things	
**2019**; 32nd	Jim Parsons	Sheldon Cooper	The Big Bang Theory	
**2020**; 33rd
**2020**; 33rd	**Jace Norman**	**Henry Hart / Kid Danger**	**Henry Danger**	
**2020**; 33rd	Joshua Bassett	Ricky Bowen	High School Musical: The Musical: The Series	
**2020**; 33rd	Karan Brar	Ravi Ross	Bunk'd	
**2020**; 33rd	Caleb McLaughlin	Lucas Sinclair	Stranger Things	
**2020**; 33rd	Jim Parsons	Sheldon Cooper	The Big Bang Theory	
**2020**; 33rd	Abraham Rodriguez	Nate Silva / Gold Ranger	Power Rangers Beast Morphers	
**2021**; 34th
**2021**; 34th	**Jace Norman**	**Henry Hart / Kid Danger**	**Henry Danger/Danger Force**	
**2021**; 34th	Iain Armitage	Sheldon Cooper	Young Sheldon	
**2021**; 34th	Joshua Bassett	Ricky	High School Musical: The Musical: The Series	
**2021**; 34th	Dylan Gilmer	Young Dylan	Tyler Perry's Young Dylan	
**2021**; 34th	Caleb McLaughlin	Lucas Sinclair	Stranger Things	
**2021**; 34th	Finn Wolfhard	Mike Wheeler	Stranger Things	
**2022**; 35th	Favorite Male TV Star – Kids Show			
**2022**; 35th	**Joshua Bassett**	**Ricky**	**High School Musical: The Musical: The Series**	
**2022**; 35th	Raphael Alejandro	Matteo Silva	Bunk'd	
**2022**; 35th	Cooper Barnes	Ray Manchester / Captain Man	Danger Force	
**2022**; 35th	Young Dylan	Young Dylan	Young Dylan	
**2022**; 35th	Bryce Gheisar	Elliott Combs and Luke McCoy	The Astronauts and Are You Afraid of the Dark?	
**2022**; 35th	Luca Luhan	Bose / Brainstorm	Danger Force	
**2022**; 35th	Favorite Male TV Star – Family Show			
**2022**; 35th	**Tom Hiddleston**	**Loki**	**Loki**	
**2022**; 35th	Iain Armitage	Sheldon Cooper	Young Sheldon	
**2022**; 35th	Nathan Kress	Freddie Benson	iCarly	
**2022**; 35th	Ralph Macchio	Daniel LaRusso	Cobra Kai	
**2022**; 35th	Jeremy Renner	Clint Barton	Hawkeye	
**2022**; 35th	Jerry Trainor	Spencer Shay	iCarly	
**2023**; 36th	Favorite Male TV Star – Kids Show			
**2023**; 36th	**Joshua Bassett**	**Ricky**	**High School Musical: The Musical: The Series**	
**2023**; 36th	Dylan Gilmer	Young Dylan	Tyler Perry's Young Dylan	
**2023**; 36th	Israel Johnson	Noah Lambert	Bunk'd	
**2023**; 36th	Brady Noon	Evan Morrow	The Mighty Ducks: Game Changers	
**2023**; 36th	Wolfgang Schaeffer	Lincoln Loud	The Really Loud House	
**2023**; 36th	Tyler Wladis	Roy	The Fairly OddParents: Fairly Odder	
**2023**; 36th	Favorite Male TV Star – Family Show			
**2023**; 36th	**Finn Wolfhard**	**Mike Wheeler**	**Stranger Things**	
**2023**; 36th	Ralph Macchio	Daniel LaRusso	Cobra Kai	
**2023**; 36th	Gaten Matarazzo	Dustin Henderson	Stranger Things	
**2023**; 36th	Ewan McGregor	Obi-Wan Kenobi	Obi-Wan Kenobi	
**2023**; 36th	Caleb McLaughlin	Lucas Sinclair	Stranger Things	
**2023**; 36th	Jerry Trainor	Spencer Shay	iCarly	
**2024**; 37th	Favorite Male TV Star – Kids Show			
**2024**; 37th	**Walker Scobell**	**Percy Jackson**	**Percy Jackson and the Olympians**	
**2024**; 37th	Joshua Bassett	Ricky	High School Musical: The Musical: The Series	
**2024**; 37th	Jahzir Bruno	Clyde McBride	The Really Loud House	
**2024**; 37th	Dylan Gilmer	Young Dylan	Tyler Perry's Young Dylan	
**2024**; 37th	Chance Perez	Javi Garcia/Black Ranger	Power Rangers Cosmic Fury	
**2024**; 37th	Wolfgang Schaeffer	Lincoln Loud	The Really Loud House	
**2024**; 37th	Favorite Male TV Star – Family Show			
**2024**; 37th	**Iain Armitage**	**Sheldon Cooper**	**Young Sheldon**	
**2024**; 37th	Gordon Cormier	Aang	Avatar: The Last Airbender	
**2024**; 37th	Tom Hiddleston	Loki	Loki	
**2024**; 37th	Justin Long	Nathan Bratt	Goosebumps	
**2024**; 37th	Zack Morris	Isaiah Howard	Goosebumps	
**2024**; 37th	Jerry Trainor	Spencer Shay	iCarly	
**2025**; 38th	Favorite Male TV Star – Kids Show			
**2025**; 38th	**Jack Griffo**	**Max Thunderman**	**The Thundermans: Undercover**	
**2025**; 38th	David Henrie	Justin Russo	Wizards Beyond Waverly Place	
**2025**; 38th	Dylan Gilmer	Young Dylan	Tyler Perry's Young Dylan	
**2025**; 38th	Hero Hunter	Charlie Wilson	Tyler Perry's Young Dylan	
**2025**; 38th	Israel Johnson	Noah Lambert	Bunk'd	
**2025**; 38th	Trevor Tordjman	Parker Preston	Bunk'd	
**2025**; 38th	Favorite Male TV Star – Family Show			
**2025**; 38th	**Xolo Maridueña**	**Miguel Diaz**	**Cobra Kai**	
**2025**; 38th	Damon Wayans Jr.	Damon	Poppa's House	
**2025**; 38th	David Schwimmer	Anthony Brewer	Goosebumps: The Vanishing	
**2025**; 38th	George Lopez	George	Lopez vs Lopez	
**2025**; 38th	Jude Law	Jod Na Nawood	Star Wars: Skeleton Crew	
**2025**; 38th	Sam McCarthy	Devin Brewer	Goosebumps: The Vanishing	
**2026**; 39th	Favorite Male TV Star - Kids Show			
**2026**; 39th	**Jack Griffo**	**Max Thunderman**	**The Thundermans: Undercover**	
**2026**; 39th	Alkaio Thiele	Roman Russo	Wizards Beyond Waverly Place	
**2026**; 39th	Aryan Simhadri	Grover Underwood	Percy Jackson and the Olympians	
**2026**; 39th	David Henrie	Justin Russo	Wizards Beyond Waverly Place	
**2026**; 39th	Gordon Cormier	Aang	Avatar: The Last Airbender	
**2026**; 39th	Walker Scobell	Percy Jackson	Percy Jackson and the Olympians	
**2026**; 39th	Favorite Male TV Star - Family Show			
**2026**; 39th	**Joe Keery**	**Steve Harrington**	**Stranger Things**	
**2026**; 39th	Bryan Cranston	Hal	Malcolm in the Middle: Life's Still Unfair	
**2026**; 39th	Cedric the Entertainer	Calvin Butler	The Neighborhood	
**2026**; 39th	David Harbour	Jim Hopper	Stranger Things	
**2026**; 39th	Finn Wolfhard	Mike Wheeler	Stranger Things	
**2026**; 39th	Frankie Muniz	Malcolm	Malcolm in the Middle: Life's Still Unfair	
**2026**; 39th	Isaac Ordonez	Pugsley Addams	Wednesday	
**2026**; 39th	Tyler James Williams	Gregory Eddie	Abbott Elementary	

== Most wins ==
5 wins

- Jace Norman (5 consecutive)

4 wins

- Tim Allen (4 consecutive)
- Ross Lynch (4 consecutive)

3 wins

- Drake Bell (3 consecutive)
- Dylan Sprouse (3 consecutive)

2 wins

- Frankie Muniz (2 consecutive)
- Joshua Bassett (2 consecutive)
- Jack Griffo (2 consecutive)

== Most nominations ==
7 nominations

- Tim Allen (2 different roles)
- Jack Griffo

6 nominations

- Jace Norman

5 nominations

- Joshua Bassett
- Frankie Muniz
- Jim Parsons
- Cole Sprouse

4 nominations

- Kirk Cameron
- Michael J. Fox (2 different roles)
- Dylan Gilmer
- Grant Gustin
- Ross Lynch
- Bernie Mac
- Caleb McLaughlin
- Will Smith
- Dylan Sprouse

3 nominations

- Iain Armitage
- Drake Bell
- Nick Cannon
- Drew Carey
- Bill Cosby
- Benjamin Flores Jr. (2 different roles)
- Ashton Kutcher
- Martin Lawrence
- Jonathan Taylor Thomas
- Jerry Trainor

2 nominations

- Karan Brar
- Young Dylan
- Jamie Foxx
- Aidan Gallagher
- Tom Hiddleston
- Israel Johnson
- Joe Jonas
- Nick Jonas
- Jason Lee
- Kel Mitchell
- Romeo
- Wolfgang Schaeffer
- Jake Short
- Casey Simpson
- Kenan Thompson
- Tyrel Jackson Williams
- Finn Wolfhard
- David Henrie
