= 2004 Kids' Choice Awards =

Children's television awards show program broadcast in 2004

- Date: April 3, 2004
- Location: Pauley Pavilion
- Hosted by: Mike Myers; Cameron Diaz
- Preshow hosts: Candace Bailey; Pick Boy

Highlights
- Most awards: Finding Nemo (2); OutKast (2)
- Most nominations: Finding Nemo (2); Bruce Almighty (2); Daddy Day Care (2); All That (2); Friends (2); Lizzie McGuire (2); OutKast (2); B2K (2); Beyoncé (2)

Television/radio coverage
- Network: Nickelodeon
- Runtime: 90 minutes
- Viewership: 5.26 million
- Produced by: Paul Flattery
- Directed by: Louis J. Horvitz

The 17th Annual Nickelodeon Kids' Choice Awards was held on April 3, 2004. The event was hosted by Mike Myers and Cameron Diaz to promote Shrek 2. This would be the first time the award show was held at the Pauley Pavilion since 1999. The ceremony is also notable as leading into "Mystery Meat", the pilot episode and first airing of the animated series Danny Phantom.

== Celebrity appearances ==
People who appeared in the ceremony: Mike Myers, Cameron Diaz, Mischa Barton, Drake Bell, Amanda Bynes, Nick Cannon, Jim Carrey, Ellen DeGeneres, Hilary Duff, Kirsten Dunst, Jennifer Garner, Anne Hathaway, Tony Hawk, Jennifer Love Hewitt, Mat Hoffman, Hugh Jackman, Queen Latifah, Avril Lavigne, Lindsay Lohan, George Lopez, Jennifer Lopez, Tobey Maguire, Ben McKenzie, Frankie Muniz, Ashley & Mary-Kate Olsen, Josh Peck, Raven Symoné, Joe Rogan, Adam Sandler, David Spade, Jamie Lynn Spears, Justin Timberlake, Serena Williams, the American Idol season 3 top 9 finalists, and OutKast.

== Winners and nominees ==
Winners are listed first, in bold.

=== Movies ===
Favorite Movie	Favorite Movie Actor
**Finding Nemo**; Bruce Almighty; Daddy Day Care; Elf	**Jim Carrey (Bruce Nolan)** – Bruce Almighty; Ashton Kutcher (Tom Leezak) – Just Married; Eddie Murphy (Charlie Hinton; Jim Evers) – Daddy Day Care and The Haunted Mansion; Mike Myers (The Cat in the Hat) – The Cat in the Hat
Favorite Movie Actress	Favorite Voice from an Animated Movie
**Amanda Bynes (Daphne Reynolds)** – What a Girl Wants; Halle Berry (Ororo Munroe/Storm) – X2: X-Men United; Cameron Diaz (Natalie Cook) – Charlie's Angels: Full Throttle; Queen Latifah (Charlene Morton) – Bringing Down the House	**Ellen DeGeneres (Dory)** – Finding Nemo; John Goodman (Baloo) – The Jungle Book 2; Brad Pitt (Sinbad) – Sinbad: Legend of the Seven Seas; Bruce Willis (Spike) – Rugrats Go Wild
Favorite Fart In A Movie
**Kangaroo Jack**; Good Boy!; Daddy Day Care; Finding Nemo

=== Television ===
Favorite TV Show	Favorite TV Actor
**All That**; Fear Factor; Friends; Lizzie McGuire	**Frankie Muniz (Malcolm)** – Malcolm in the Middle; Ashton Kutcher (Michael Kelso; Himself) – That '70s Show and Punk'd; Lil' Romeo (Romeo Miller) – Romeo!; Bernie Mac (Bernie 'Mac' McCullough) – The Bernie Mac Show
Favorite TV Actress	Favorite Cartoon
**Raven-Symoné (Raven Baxter)** – That's So Raven; Jennifer Aniston (Rachel Green) – Friends; Hilary Duff (Lizzie McGuire) – Lizzie McGuire; Jamie Lynn Spears – All That	**SpongeBob SquarePants**; The Fairly OddParents; The Proud Family; The Simpsons

=== Music ===
Favorite Male Singer	Favorite Female Singer
**Nelly**; Bow Wow; Nick Cannon; Justin Timberlake	**Hilary Duff**; Ashanti; Beyoncé; Jennifer Lopez
Favorite Music Group	Favorite Song
**Outkast**; B2K; Good Charlotte; No Doubt	**"Hey Ya!"** – Outkast; "Bump, Bump, Bump" – B2K; "Crazy in Love" (featuring Jay Z) – Beyoncé; "Where Is the Love?" (featuring Justin Timberlake) – The Black Eyed Peas

=== Sports ===
Favorite Male Athlete	Favorite Female Athlete
**Tony Hawk**; Shaquille O'Neal; Sammy Sosa; Tiger Woods	**Mia Hamm**; Kelly Clark; Serena Williams; Venus Williams
Favorite Sports Team
**Los Angeles Lakers**; Chicago Cubs; Miami Dolphins; New York Yankees

=== Others ===
Favorite Video Game	Favorite Book
**SpongeBob SquarePants: Battle for Bikini Bottom**; Finding Nemo; Harry Potter: Quidditch World Cup; Super Mario Advance 4	**Harry Potter series**; Captain Underpants series; Holes; The Lord of the Rings

=== Wannabe Award ===
- Adam Sandler

=== Best Burp ===
- Hugh Jackman
