= 2006 Kids' Choice Awards =

Children's television awards show program broadcast in 2006

- Date: April 1, 2006
- Location: Pauley Pavilion
- Hosted by: Jack Black

Highlights
- Most awards: Madagascar (2); Drake & Josh (2); Green Day (2)
- Most nominations: Madagascar (3)

Television/radio coverage
- Network: Nickelodeon
- Viewership: 5.9 million
- Produced by: Paul Flattery
- Directed by: Bruce Gowers

The 19th Annual Nickelodeon Kids' Choice Awards was held on April 1, 2006, at UCLA’s Pauley Pavilion. The event was hosted by actor/musician Jack Black. Chris Brown, Bow Wow, and P!nk performed.

The nominations were released on February 7, 2006. They include favorites from movies, television, music, and sports from 2005.

== Winners and nominees ==
Winners are listed first, in bold. Other nominees are in alphabetical order.

=== Movies ===
| Favorite Movie | Favorite Movie Actor |
|---|---|
| **Harry Potter and the Goblet of Fire**; Are We There Yet?; Charlie and the Chocolate Factory; Herbie: Fully Loaded | **Will Smith** – Hitch as Alex "Hitch" Hitchens; Jim Carrey – Fun with Dick and Jane as Richard "Dick" Harper; Johnny Depp – Charlie and the Chocolate Factory as Willy Wonka; Ice Cube – Are We There Yet? as Nicholas "Nick" Persons |
| Favorite Movie Actress | Favorite Animated Movie |
| **Lindsay Lohan** – Herbie: Fully Loaded as Margaret "Maggie" Peyton; Jessica Alba – Fantastic Four as Sue Storm / Invisible Woman; Drew Barrymore – Fever Pitch as Lindsey Meeks; Dakota Fanning – Dreamer as Cale Crane | **Madagascar**; Chicken Little; Robots; Wallace & Gromit: The Curse of the Were-Rabbit |
Favorite Voice From an Animated Movie
**Chris Rock** – Madagascar as Marty; Johnny Depp – Corpse Bride as Victor Van Dort; Ben Stiller – Madagascar as Alex; Robin Williams – Robots as Fender Pinwheeler

=== Television ===
| Favorite TV Show | Favorite TV Actor |
|---|---|
| **Drake & Josh**; American Idol; Fear Factor; That's So Raven | **Drake Bell** – Drake & Josh as Drake Parker; Ashton Kutcher – That '70s Show as Michael Kelso; Bernie Mac – The Bernie Mac Show as Bernard "Bernie" McCullough; Romeo – Romeo! as Romeo "Ro" Miller |
| Favorite TV Actress | Favorite Cartoon |
| **Jamie Lynn Spears** – Zoey 101 as Zoey Brooks; Eve – Eve as Shelly Williams; Jennifer Love Hewitt – Ghost Whisperer as Melinda Gordon; Raven-Symoné – That's So Raven as Raven Baxter | **SpongeBob SquarePants**; The Adventures of Jimmy Neutron, Boy Genius; The Fairly OddParents; The Simpsons |

=== Music ===
| Favorite Male Singer | Favorite Female Singer |
|---|---|
| **Jesse McCartney**; Bow Wow; Nelly; Will Smith | **Kelly Clarkson**; Mariah Carey; Hilary Duff; Alicia Keys |
| Favorite Music Group | Favorite Song |
| **Green Day**; Backstreet Boys; The Black Eyed Peas; Destiny's Child | **"Wake Me Up When September Ends"** – Green Day; "1, 2 Step" – Ciara; "Hollaback Girl" – Gwen Stefani; "We Belong Together" – Mariah Carey |

=== Miscellaneous ===
| Favorite Athlete | Favorite Book |
|---|---|
| **Lance Armstrong**; Allen Iverson; Shaquille O'Neal; Alex Rodriguez | **Harry Potter series**; The Chronicles of Narnia; The Giving Tree; A Series of Unfortunate Events |
Favorite Video Game
**Madagascar: Operation Penguin**; The Incredibles: Rise of the Underminer; Madden NFL 06; Mario Superstar Baseball

=== Wannabe Award ===
- Chris Rock
