= 2003 Kids' Choice Awards =

Children's television awards show program broadcast in 2003

- Date: April 12, 2003
- Location: Barker Hangar, Santa Monica, California
- Hosted by: Rosie O'Donnell
- Preshow hosts: Brent Popolizio; Candace Bailey

Highlights
- Most awards: Adam Sandler and Amanda Bynes (2)
- Most nominations: Ice Age and Lizzie McGuire (3)

Television/radio coverage
- Network: Nickelodeon
- Runtime: 90 minutes
- Produced by: Paul Flattery
- Directed by: Glenn Weiss

The 16th Annual Nickelodeon Kids' Choice Awards was held on April 12, 2003, hosted by Rosie O'Donnell. The award show was held in the Barker Hangar at the Santa Monica Airport in Santa Monica, California. This was the last time O'Donnell would host the awards. By this point, she had hosted the awards seven times in a row. The announcers were Daran Norris and Susanne Blakeslee from The Fairly OddParents, in character as Cosmo and Wanda, respectively, for the event.

Justin Timberlake highlighted the show by performing his hit "Rock Your Body". Later, B2K performed a "That Girl"/"Girlfriend" medley with Marques Houston.

== Winners and nominees ==
Winners are listed first, in bold. Other nominees are in alphabetical order.

=== Movies ===
Favorite Movie	Favorite Movie Actor
**Austin Powers in Goldmember**; Harry Potter and the Chamber of Secrets; Ice Age; Spider-Man	**Adam Sandler** – Mr. Deeds as Longfellow Deeds; Jackie Chan – The Tuxedo as Jimmy Tong; Mike Myers – Austin Powers in Goldmember as Austin Powers / Dr. Evil / Fat Bastard / Goldmember; Will Smith – Men in Black II as James Darrell Edwards III / Agent J
Favorite Movie Actress	Favorite Voice from an Animated Movie
**Amanda Bynes** – Big Fat Liar as Kaylee; Halle Berry – Die Another Day as Giacinta 'Jinx' Johnson; Kirsten Dunst – Spider-Man as Mary Jane Watson; Jennifer Lopez – Maid in Manhattan as Marisa Ventura	**Adam Sandler** – Eight Crazy Nights as Davey Stone / Whitey Duvall / Eleanor Duvall / Deer; Matt Damon – Spirit: Stallion of the Cimarron as Spirit; Denis Leary – Ice Age as Diego; Ray Romano – Ice Age as Manny
Favorite Fart In A Movie
**Scooby-Doo**; The Master of Disguise; Austin Powers in Goldmember; The Crocodile Hunter: Collision Course

=== Television ===
Favorite TV Show	Favorite TV Actor
**Lizzie McGuire**; 7th Heaven; All That; Friends	**Frankie Muniz** – Malcolm in the Middle as Malcolm; Nick Cannon – The Nick Cannon Show as Himself; Adam Lamberg – Lizzie McGuire as David "Gordo" Gordon; Bernie Mac – The Bernie Mac Show as Bernie McCullough
Favorite TV Actress	Favorite Cartoon
**Amanda Bynes** – The Amanda Show as various characters; Jennifer Aniston – Friends as Rachel Green; Hilary Duff – Lizzie McGuire as Lizzie McGuire; Melissa Joan Hart – Sabrina the Teenage Witch as Sabrina Spellman	**SpongeBob SquarePants**; Kim Possible; Rugrats; The Simpsons

=== Music ===
Favorite Male Singer	Favorite Female Singer
**Nelly**; Bow Wow; Lil' Romeo; Justin Timberlake	**Ashanti**; Britney Spears; Jennifer Lopez; P!nk
Favorite Music Group	Favorite Band
**B2K**; Baha Men; Destiny's Child; *NSYNC	**No Doubt**; Aerosmith; Creed; Dixie Chicks
Favorite Song
**"Sk8er Boi"** – Avril Lavigne; "Dilemma" – Nelly feat. Kelly Rowland; "Girlfriend (The Neptunes Remix)" – *NSYNC feat. Nelly; "Jenny From the Block" – Jennifer Lopez

=== Sports ===
Favorite Male Athlete	Favorite Female Athlete
**Tony Hawk**; Kobe Bryant; Shaquille O'Neal; Tiger Woods	**Michelle Kwan**; Mia Hamm; Serena Williams; Venus Williams
Favorite Sports Team
**Los Angeles Lakers**; Los Angeles Angels; Miami Dolphins; New York Yankees

=== Others ===
Favorite Video Game	Favorite Book
**SpongeBob SquarePants: Revenge of the Flying Dutchman**; Harry Potter and the Chamber of Secrets; Mario Party 4; Spider-Man	**A Series of Unfortunate Events**; Captain Underpants series; Double Fudge; Harry Potter series
Favorite Male Butt Kicker	Favorite Female Butt Kicker
**Jackie Chan** – The Tuxedo as Jimmy Tong; Dwayne "The Rock" Johnson – The Scorpion King as Mathayus / The Scorpion King; Tobey Maguire – Spider-Man as Peter Parker / Spider-Man; Elijah Wood – The Lord of the Rings: The Two Towers as Frodo Baggins	**Jennifer Love Hewitt** – The Tuxedo as Del Blaine; Halle Berry – Die Another Day as Giacinta 'Jinx' Johnson; Sarah Michelle Gellar – Buffy the Vampire Slayer as Buffy Summers; Beyoncé Knowles – Austin Powers in Goldmember as Foxxy Cleopatra

=== Best Burp ===
- Justin Timberlake

=== Wannabe Award ===
- Will Smith
