= Kids' Choice Award for Favorite Female Artist =

Artist award

This is a list of winners and nominees for the Kids' Choice Award for Favorite Female Artist, given at the Nickelodeon Kids' Choice Awards. It was first awarded in 2000 at the 13th Kids' Choice Awards, and changed from "Favorite Female Singer" to "Favorite Female Artist" in 2018.

The most awarded female artist in this category is Ariana Grande with 5 wins, followed by Selena Gomez with 4 wins. Grande has also won the award 4 consecutive years (2019-2022). The artist who have received the most nominations, as of the 2025 ceremony is Taylor Swift with fifteen nominations, followed by Beyoncé with fourteen.

== Winners and nominations ==
Year	Recipient	Nominees
2000	Britney Spears	Christina Aguilera; Brandy; Jennifer Lopez
2001	Britney Spears	Christina Aguilera; Jennifer Lopez; Pink
2002	Pink	Janet Jackson; Jennifer Lopez; Britney Spears
2003	Ashanti	Jennifer Lopez; Pink; Britney Spears
2004	Hilary Duff	Ashanti; Beyoncé; Jennifer Lopez
2005	Avril Lavigne	Beyoncé; Hilary Duff; Alicia Keys
2006	Kelly Clarkson	Mariah Carey; Hilary Duff; Alicia Keys
2007	Beyoncé	Christina Aguilera; Ciara; Jessica Simpson
2008	Miley Cyrus	Beyoncé; Fergie; Alicia Keys
2009	Miley Cyrus	Beyoncé; Alicia Keys; Rihanna
2010	Taylor Swift	Beyoncé; Miley Cyrus; Lady Gaga
2011	Katy Perry	Selena Gomez; Miley Cyrus; Taylor Swift
2012	Selena Gomez	Lady Gaga; Katy Perry; Taylor Swift
2013	Katy Perry	Adele; Pink; Taylor Swift
2014	Selena Gomez	Lady Gaga; Katy Perry; Taylor Swift
2015	Selena Gomez	Beyoncé; Ariana Grande; Nicki Minaj; Katy Perry; Taylor Swift
2016	Ariana Grande	Adele; Selena Gomez; Nicki Minaj; Meghan Trainor; Taylor Swift
2017	Selena Gomez	Adele; Beyoncé; Ariana Grande; Rihanna; Meghan Trainor
2018	Demi Lovato	Beyoncé; Katy Perry; Pink; Selena Gomez; Taylor Swift; Cardi B
2019	Ariana Grande	Beyoncé; Camila Cabello; Cardi B; Selena Gomez; Taylor Swift
2020	Ariana Grande	Beyoncé; Billie Eilish; Katy Perry; Selena Gomez; Taylor Swift
2021	Ariana Grande	Taylor Swift; Beyoncé; Billie Eilish; Katy Perry; Selena Gomez
2022	Ariana Grande	Taylor Swift; Adele; Lady Gaga; Billie Eilish; Cardi B
2023	Taylor Swift	Adele; Cardi B; Beyoncé; Billie Eilish; Lady Gaga; Lizzo; Rihanna
2024	Taylor Swift	Ariana Grande; Beyoncé; Billie Eilish; Cardi B; Miley Cyrus; Olivia Rodrigo; Selena Gomez
2025	SZA	Ariana Grande; Billie Eilish; Cardi B; Katy Perry; Lady Gaga; Selena Gomez; Taylor Swift
2026	Rosé	Ariana Grande; Cardi B; Karol G; Miley; Olivia Rodrigo; Sabrina Carpenter; Taylor Swift

== Most wins ==
5 wins

- Ariana Grande (4 consecutive)

4 wins

- Selena Gomez (2 consecutive)

3 wins

- Taylor Swift (2 consecutive)

2 wins

- Miley Cyrus (2 consecutive)
- Katy Perry
- Britney Spears (2 consecutive)

== Most nominations ==
16 nominations

- Taylor Swift

14 nominations

- Beyoncé

12 nominations

- Selena Gomez

10 nominations

- Ariana Grande

9 nominations

- Katy Perry

7 nominations

- Cardi B

6 nominations

- Billie Eilish
- Lady Gaga
- Miley Cyrus

5 nominations

- Adele
- Jennifer Lopez
- Pink

4 nominations

- Brandy
- Alicia Keys
- Britney Spears

3 nominations

- Christina Aguilera
- Hilary Duff
- Rihanna

2 nominations

- Ashanti
- Nicki Minaj
- Olivia Rodrigo
- Meghan Trainor
