= Bernie Mac =

American comedian and actor (1957–2008)

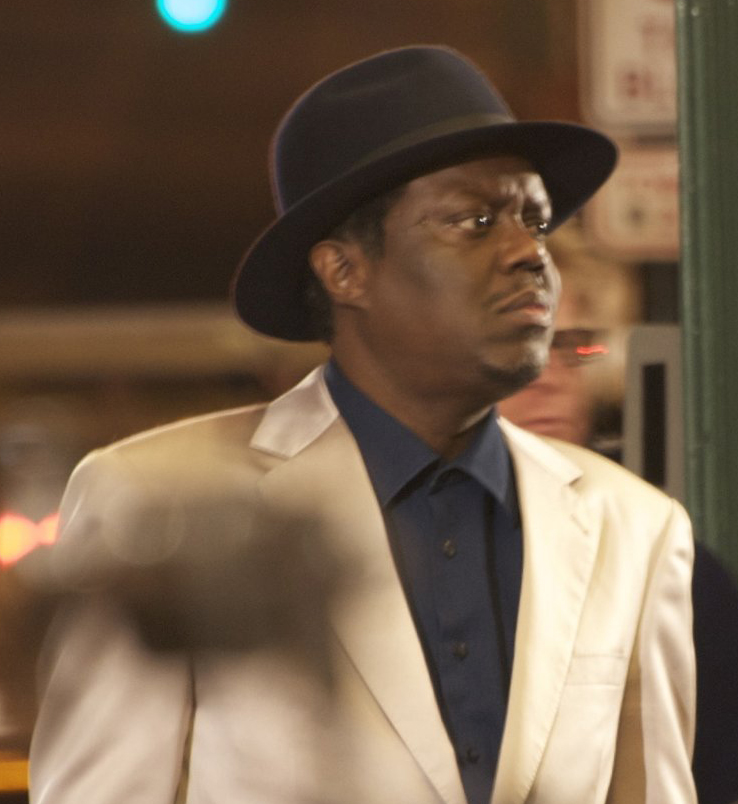
- Mac on the set of Soul Men in March 2008
- Born: Bernard Jeffrey McCullough; October 5, 1957; Chicago, Illinois, U.S.
- Died: August 9, 2008 (aged 50); Chicago, Illinois, U.S.
- Resting place: Washington Memory Gardens; Homewood, Illinois, U.S.
- Education: Chicago Vocational High School
- Spouse: Rhonda Gore (m. 1977)
- Children: 1

Comedy career
- Years active: 1977–2008
- Medium: Stand-up; film; television
- Genre: Observational comedy

Bernard Jeffrey McCullough (October 5, 1957 – August 9, 2008), known professionally as Bernie Mac, was an American stand-up comedian, actor and film producer. His most noted film roles were as Frank Catton in the Ocean's film series from 2001 through 2007 and as the title character of Mr. 3000. Mac joined Steve Harvey, Cedric the Entertainer, and D. L. Hughley as one of the "Big Four" comedians in the film The Original Kings of Comedy. After briefly hosting the HBO show Midnight Mac, Mac appeared in several films in smaller roles. He was the star of The Bernie Mac Show, which ran from 2001 through 2006, earning him two Emmy Award nominations for Outstanding Lead Actor in a Comedy Series. His other films included starring roles in The Players Club, Head of State, Bad Santa, Guess Who, Pride, and Soul Men. Mac died at age 50 on August 9, 2008 in Chicago, Illinois from complications of pneumonia.

== Early life and education ==
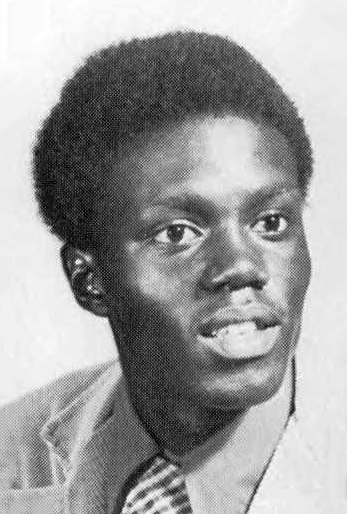
Mac graduation photo, 1975

Bernard Jeffrey McCullough was born on October 5, 1957 in Chicago, Illinois. Mac was the second child of Mary McCullough and Jeffrey Harrison. Mac was raised by his single mother and his grandparents on the city's south side.

Mac began his high school career at Chicago Vocational High School. During 1973, Mac moved to Tampa, Florida, to attend Jesuit High School following the death of his mother during his sophomore year. Shortly afterward, Mac's older brother and his estranged father both died. Mac later returned to Chicago and graduated from Chicago Vocational in 1975. During his 20s and through his early 30s, Mac worked in a variety of jobs, including janitor, coach, professional mover, cook, bus driver, Wonder Bread delivery man, furniture mover, and UPS agent, while doing comedy on the weekends at clubs and parties.

== Career ==
=== Early years ===
Mac's influences were from the Three Stooges and listening to stand-up comedians Richard Pryor and Redd Foxx. Mac started as a stand-up comedian in Chicago's Cotton Club. After he won the Miller Lite Comedy Search at the age of 32, his popularity as a comedian began to grow. In 1992, a performance on the 3rd episode of HBO's Def Comedy Jam thrust him into the spotlight; after Martin Lawrence was unable to calm an increasingly hostile crowd, Mac went onstage and told the audience "I ain't scared o' you mothafuckas" and that he "didn't come here for no foolishness." His early film appearances include Mo' Money (1992), House Party 3 (1994) and Friday (1995). Mac eventually joined Steve Harvey, Cedric the Entertainer, and D. L. Hughley as one of the "Big Four" comedians performing on the popular Kings of Comedy tour, which led to the film The Original Kings of Comedy (2000).

=== The Bernie Mac Show ===
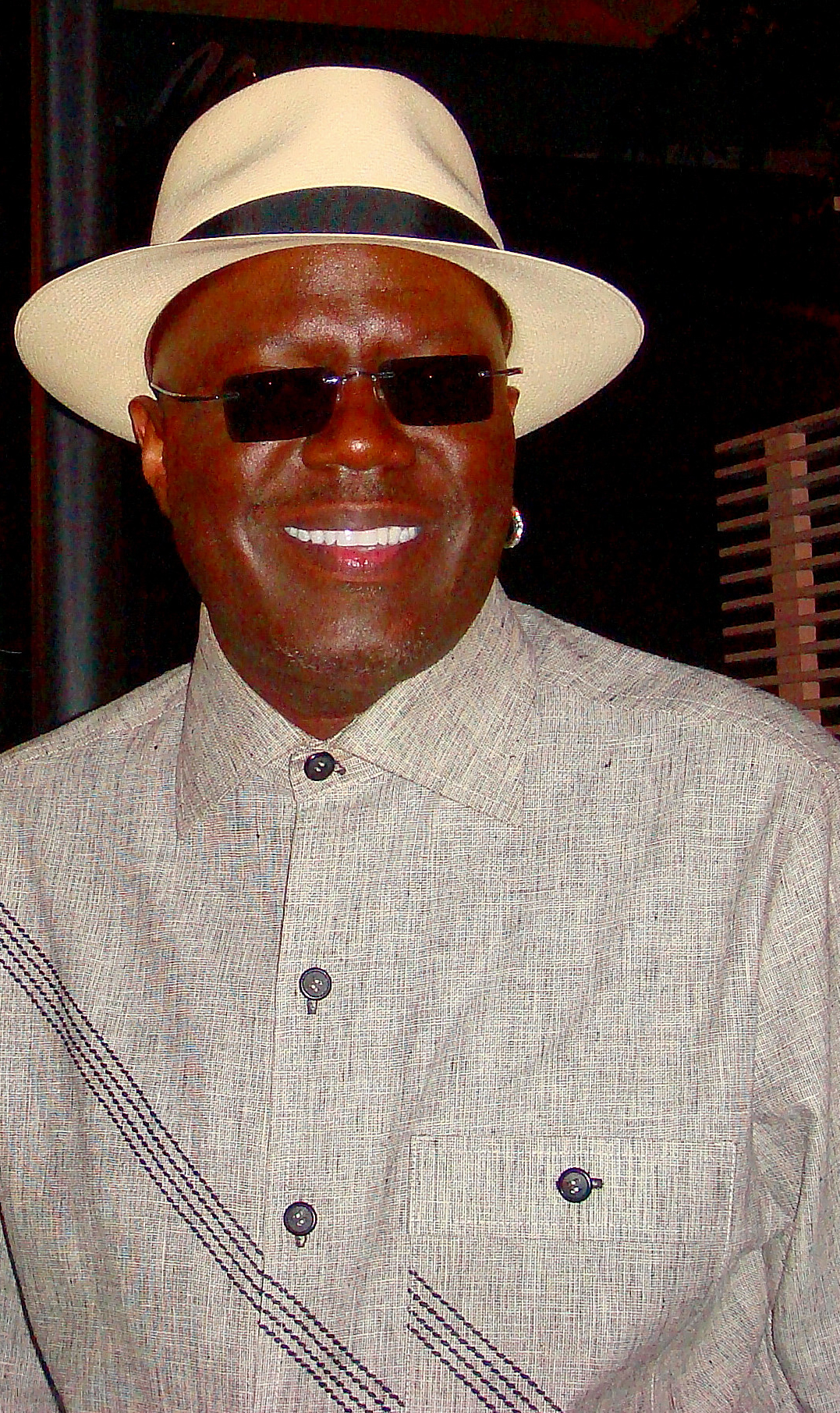
Bernie Mac at the Transformers premiere in June 2007

In 2001, the Fox network gave Mac his own television sitcom called The Bernie Mac Show portraying a fictional version of himself. In the show, he suddenly becomes custodian of his sister's three children after she enters rehab. Mac broke the fourth wall to tell his thoughts to the audience. The show contained many parodies of events in Bernie's actual life. Mac, who grew up on Chicago's South Side, was a fan of the Chicago White Sox, and would often sneak a reference to his favorite team in episodes, including enlisting then-White Sox pitcher Jon Garland to make a guest cameo appearance. In the 2005 season he wore a White Sox jacket and cap, and congratulated his hometown Chicago White Sox and their staff members on their recent World Series championship. The show was not renewed after the 2005–2006 season. The series finale aired on April 14, 2006. Among other awards, the show won an Emmy for "Outstanding Writing", the Peabody Award for excellence in broadcasting, and the Humanitas Prize for television writing that promotes human dignity. His character on The Bernie Mac Show was ranked No. 47 in TV Guide's list of the "50 Greatest TV Dads of All Time". During his run on the show, Mac had co-starring roles in the Ocean's trilogy (2001–2007), Head of State (2003), Charlie's Angels: Full Throttle (2003) and Bad Santa (2003), as well as starring roles in the baseball-themed film Mr. 3000 (2004) and Guess Who? (2005), a remake of the 1967 film Guess Who's Coming to Dinner.

=== Later years ===
On March 19, 2007, Mac told David Letterman on the CBS Late Show that he would retire from his 30-year career after he finished shooting the comedy film, The Whole Truth, Nothing but the Truth, So Help Me Mac. "I'm going to still do my producing, my films, but I want to enjoy my life a little bit", Mac told Letterman. "I missed a lot of things, you know. I was a street performer for two years. I went into clubs in 1977 and was on the road 47 weeks out of the year." During this time, Mac was having success as a popular film actor, starting with an appearance in the 2007 film Transformers as the car salesman "Bobby Bolivia", and serving as the voice of Zuba, Alex the Lion's long-lost father in the 2008 animated film Madagascar: Escape 2 Africa. He co-starred with Terrence Howard in the biograhical film Pride and Samuel L. Jackson in the 2008 musical comedy Soul Men. Madagascar: Escape 2 Africa and Soul Men were released months after his death. His final film role was as Jimmy Lunchbox in the 2009 film Old Dogs, which was released a year after his death.

== Personal life, health and death ==
Mac married his high school sweetheart Rhonda Gore on September 17, 1977, and together they had a daughter in 1978. In the last 20 years of his life, Mac publicly disclosed that he had severe sarcoidosis, a disease of unknown origin that causes inflammation in tissue. On July 19, 2008, Mac was admitted to Northwestern Memorial Hospital in his hometown of Chicago. After being treated in the ICU for three weeks for pneumonia, Mac went into cardiac arrest and subsequently died during the early morning hours on August 9, at the age of 50. However, the complications were not attributed to his sarcoidosis, according to his publicist. Madagascar: Escape 2 Africa and Soul Men were released posthumously and dedicated to his memory.

== Legacy and tributes ==
Mac's public memorial was held a week after his death at the House of Hope Church, with nearly 7,000 people in attendance. Notable mourners at Mac's funeral were Chris Rock, Chicago Mayor Richard M. Daley, Samuel L. Jackson, Ashton Kutcher, Don Cheadle, the cast members from The Bernie Mac Show, and his Kings of Comedy fellows D. L. Hughley, Cedric the Entertainer, and Steve Harvey. The first two of Mac's posthumous films, Soul Men and Madagascar: Escape 2 Africa, were released three months after his death and dedicated to him. Mac's third posthumously released and final film, Old Dogs, was released a year after his death; it too was dedicated in part to Mac. The 2008 Bud Billiken Parade, which was held in Chicago on the day of Mac's death, was also dedicated to his memory. On the day of Mac's funeral, his hometown's local television station WCIU-TV aired an exclusive television special, A Tribute to Bernie Mac, and had interviews with his former colleagues including Camille Winbush, Chris Rock, Joe Torry, Cameron Diaz, Don Cheadle, and some of his family members and close friends. During Steve Harvey's television show which aired November 14, 2016, Harvey read a proclamation from Chicago's Mayor Rahm Emanuel proclaiming November 14 as "Bernie Mac Day". Steve Harvey's guests included Bernie's wife Rhonda, their daughter Je'Niece, granddaughter Jasmine, and Bernie's The Original Kings of Comedy co-stars D. L. Hughley, Cedric the Entertainer, and Guy Torry (who was the original host at the beginning of the tour). Mike Epps, appearing via satellite, along with the principal of Bernie and Rhonda's alma mater Chicago Vocational High School (CVS), revealed and unveiled the renaming of CVS Auditorium to the "Bernie Mac Auditorium". On February 14, 2017, Rolling Stone named Bernie Mac #41 of the 50 Best Stand-Up Comics of All Time.

== Filmography ==
Year	Title	Role	Notes
1992	Mo' Money	Club doorman	
1993	Who's the Man?	G-George	
1994	House Party 3	Uncle Fester	
1994	Above the Rim	Flip	
1995	The Walking Dead	Ray	
1995	Friday	Pastor Clever	
1996	Don't Be a Menace to South Central While Drinking Your Juice in the Hood	Officer Self Hatred	Cameo
1996	Get on the Bus	Jay	
1997	Booty Call	Judge Peabody	
1997	B*A*P*S	Mr. Johnson	
1997	Def Jam's How to Be a Player	Buster	
1998	The Players Club	Dollar Bill	
1999	Life	Jangle Leg	
2000	The Original Kings of Comedy	Himself	Documentary
2001	What's the Worst That Could Happen?	Uncle Jack	
2001	Ocean's Eleven	Frank Catton	
2003	Head of State	Mitch Gilliam	
2003	Charlie's Angels: Full Throttle	Jimmy Bosley	
2003	Bad Santa	Gin Slagel	
2004	Mr. 3000	Stan Ross	
2004	Ocean's Twelve	Frank Catton	
2005	Guess Who	Percy Jones	
2005	Lil' Pimp	Fruit Juice (voice)	
2005	Inspector Gadget's Biggest Caper Ever	Gadgetmobile (voice)	
2007	Pride	Elston	
2007	Ocean's Thirteen	Frank Catton	
2007	Transformers	Bobby Bolivia	
2008	Madagascar: Escape 2 Africa	Zuba (voice)	Posthumous release; dedicated in memory
2008	Soul Men	Floyd Henderson	Posthumous release; dedicated in memory
2009	Old Dogs	Jimmy Lunchbox	Posthumous release; dedicated in memory

Television
Year	Title	Role	Notes
1996–1999; 2000	Moesha	Uncle Bernie	9 episodes
1997	The Wayans Bros.	Shank	1 episode
1997	Don King: Only in America	Bundini Brown	Television film
2001–2006	The Bernie Mac Show	Bernie "Mac" McCullough	104 episodes, fictionalized version of himself
2003	King of the Hill	Mack	Voice, 1 episode
2003	Saturday Night Live	Himself/host	

== Awards and nominations ==
Year	Award	Category	Work	Result
2005	BET Comedy Awards	Outstanding Lead Actor in a Comedy Series	The Bernie Mac Show	Won
2005	Black Reel Awards	Best Actor, Musical or Comedy	Mr. 3000	Won
2002	Emmy Awards	Outstanding Lead Actor in a Comedy Series	The Bernie Mac Show	Nominated
2003	Emmy Awards	Outstanding Lead Actor in a Comedy Series	The Bernie Mac Show	Nominated
2003	Golden Globe Awards	Best Performance by an Actor in a Television Series – Musical or Comedy	The Bernie Mac Show	Nominated
2004	Golden Globe Awards	Best Performance by an Actor in a Television Series – Musical or Comedy	The Bernie Mac Show	Nominated
2003	Kids Choice Awards	Favorite TV Actor	The Bernie Mac Show	Nominated
2004	Kids Choice Awards	Favorite TV Actor	The Bernie Mac Show	Nominated
2005	Kids Choice Awards	Favorite TV Actor	The Bernie Mac Show	Nominated
2006	Kids Choice Awards	Favorite TV Actor	The Bernie Mac Show	Nominated
2002	NAACP Image Awards	Outstanding Actor in a Comedy Series	The Bernie Mac Show	Nominated
2003	NAACP Image Awards	Outstanding Actor in a Comedy Series	The Bernie Mac Show	Won
2004	NAACP Image Awards	Outstanding Supporting Actor in a Motion Picture	Head of State	Nominated
2004	NAACP Image Awards	Outstanding Actor in a Comedy Series	The Bernie Mac Show	Won
2005	NAACP Image Awards	Outstanding Actor in a Comedy Series	The Bernie Mac Show	Won
2006	NAACP Image Awards	Outstanding Actor in a Comedy Series	The Bernie Mac Show	Won
2007	NAACP Image Awards	Outstanding Actor in a Comedy Series	The Bernie Mac Show	Nominated
2003	PRISM Awards	Performance in a Comedy Series	The Bernie Mac Show	Won
2003	Satellite Awards	Best Performance by an Actor in a Series, Comedy or Musical	The Bernie Mac Show	Won
2004	Satellite Awards	Best Performance by an Actor in a Series, Comedy or Musical	The Bernie Mac Show	Won
2005	Satellite Awards	Best Performance by an Actor in a Series, Comedy or Musical	The Bernie Mac Show	Nominated
2002	Television Critics Association Awards	Individual Achievement in Comedy	The Bernie Mac Show	Won

== Books ==
- I Ain't Scared of You: Bernie Mac on How Life Is (with Darrell Dawsey), MTV Books, 2001. ISBN 978-0743428217
- Maybe You Never Cry Again, HarperEntertainment, 2003. ISBN 978-0060529284
- I Don't Care If You Like Me, I Like Me: Bernie Mac's Daily Motivational (with Rhonda R. McCullough), Permuted Press, 2022. ISBN 978-1637584040 (Published posthumously)
