= 1995 Kids' Choice Awards =

Children's television awards show program broadcast in 1995

- Date: May 20, 1995
- Location: Barker Hangar; Santa Monica, California
- Hosted by: Whitney Houston

Television/radio coverage
- Network: Nickelodeon
- Directed by: Bruce Gowers

The 8th Annual Nickelodeon Kids' Choice Awards was held on May 20, 1995, at the Barker Hangar in Santa Monica, California. Whitney Houston was the host. Over twenty-six million kids participated in the voting. This is the first show to be held at the Barker Hangar in California.

== Performers ==
Artist(s)	Song(s)
Brandy	"Baby"
Soul for Real	"Candy Rain"
Montell Jordan	"This Is How We Do It"
Brandy	"Best Friend"

Glamour Girls & Melodic performed during the opening of the show.

== Presenters ==
- LL Cool J and Raven Symoné presented Favorite TV Actress
- Ben Savage and Rosie O’Donnell presented Favorite TV Actor
- Kelly Packard and Jeremy Jackson presented Favorite TV Show
- Whitney Houston (host) introduced Brandy’s performance
- TLC presented Favorite Female Athlete
- The cast of On Our Own presented Favorite Male Athlete
- Mark Curry and Taran Noah Smith presented Favorite Sports Team
- Whitney Houston introduced Soul For Real’s performance
- Rick Adams presented the International Award to Boyzone
- Jenna von Oÿ and Malcolm-Jamal Warner presented Favorite Movie Actress
- Michael Fishman, Lacey Chabert and Milo the Dog presented Favorite Movie Actor
- Tatyana Ali and Jason James Richter presented Favorite Movie
- Kenan Thompson and Kel Mitchell introduced Montell Jordan’s performance
- Tia Mowry, Tamera Mowry and Rider Strong presented Favorite Singer
- Tevin Campbell and Natalia Cigliuti presented Favorite Group
- All-4-One presented Favorite Song
- Melissa Joan Hart presented the new Hall Of Fame member Boyz II Men

== Winners and nominees ==
Winners are listed first, in bold. Other nominees are in alphabetical order.

=== Movies ===
Favorite Movie	Favorite Movie Actor
**The Lion King**; Ace Ventura: Pet Detective; Speed	**Jim Carrey** – Ace Ventura: Pet Detective as Ace Ventura; Keanu Reeves – Speed as Jack Traven; Tim Allen – The Santa Clause as Scott Calvin/Santa Claus
Favorite Movie Actress
**Rosie O'Donnell** – The Flintstones as Betty Rubble; Sally Field – Forrest Gump as Mrs. Gump; Sandra Bullock – Speed as Annie Porter

=== Television ===
Favorite TV Show	Favorite TV Actor
**Home Improvement**; Martin; The Fresh Prince of Bel-Air	**Tim Allen** – Home Improvement as Timothy "Tim" Taylor; Martin Lawrence – Martin as Martin Payne; Sinbad – The Sinbad Show as David Bryan
Favorite TV Actress	Favorite Cartoon
**Tia & Tamera Mowry** – Sister, Sister as Tia Landry & Tamera Campbell; Queen Latifah – Living Single as Khadijah James; Roseanne Barr – Roseanne as Roseanne Conner	**Doug**; Aladdin; Animaniacs

=== Music ===
Favorite Singer	Favorite Group
**Janet Jackson**; Babyface; Mariah Carey	**Boyz II Men**; All-4-One; TLC
Favorite Song
**"Creep"** – TLC; "I'll Make Love to You" – Boyz II Men; "On Bended Knee" – Boyz II Men

=== Sports ===
Favorite Male Athlete	Favorite Female Athlete
**Shaquille O'Neal** (Orlando Magic); Charles Barkley (Phoenix Suns); Joe Montana (Kansas City Chiefs)	**Nancy Kerrigan** (Figure skating); Bonnie Blair (Speed skating); Shannon Miller (Gymnastics)
Favorite Sports Team
**Chicago Bulls**; Dallas Cowboys; San Francisco 49ers

=== Miscellaneous ===
Favorite Video Game	Favorite Animal Star
**Donkey Kong Country**; Disney's Aladdin; NBA Jam	**Milo** – The Mask; Buck – Married... with Children; Comet – Full House
Favorite Book	Nick U.K.'s Favorite New Performer
**Deep Trouble** by R. L. Stine; Halloween Night II by R. L. Stine; The Last Vampire by Christopher Pike	**Boyzone**

== Special Recognition ==
=== Hall of Fame ===
- Boyz II Men
  - Janet Jackson
  - Whoopi Goldberg
