= 2002 Kids' Choice Awards =

Children's television awards show program broadcast in 2002

- Date: April 20, 2002
- Location: Barker Hangar, Santa Monica Airport, Santa Monica, California
- Hosted by: Rosie O'Donnell

Highlights
- Most awards: Rush Hour 2 (3)
- Most nominations: Rush Hour 2 (6)

Television/radio coverage
- Network: Nickelodeon
- Runtime: 120 minutes
- Viewership: 5.86 million
- Produced by: Paul Flattery
- Directed by: Glenn Weiss

The 15th Annual Nickelodeon Kids' Choice Awards was held on April 20, 2002, at Santa Monica Airport's Barker Hangar in Santa Monica, California. It was aired on Nickelodeon and hosted by Rosie O'Donnell for the seventh consecutive year.

A special program, "The Secrets of the Jimmy Neutron Movie", a special preview to the then-upcoming series, The Adventures of Jimmy Neutron, Boy Genius, aired after the ceremony.

== Musical performers ==
- B2K - "Uh Huh"
- P!nk - "Get The Party Started"
- Usher - "U Don't Have to Call"

== Winners and nominees ==
Winners are listed first and in boldface.

=== Movies ===
| Favorite Movie | Favorite Movie Actor |
|---|---|
| **Rush Hour 2**; Dr. Dolittle 2; Harry Potter and the Sorcerer's Stone; Shrek | **Chris Tucker (Detective James Carter)** – Rush Hour 2; Jackie Chan (Chief Inspector Yan Naing Lee) – Rush Hour 2; Brendan Fraser (Rick O'Connell) – The Mummy Returns; Eddie Murphy (Dr. John Dolittle) – Dr. Dolittle 2 |
| Favorite Movie Actress | Favorite Voice from an Animated Movie |
| **Jennifer Lopez (Mary Fiore)** – The Wedding Planner; Julie Andrews (Queen Clarisse Renaldi) – The Princess Diaries; Raven-Symoné (Charisse Dolittle) – Dr. Dolittle 2; Reese Witherspoon (Elle Woods) – Legally Blonde | **Eddie Murphy (Donkey)** – Shrek; Billy Crystal (Mike Wazowski) – Monsters, Inc.; Cameron Diaz (Princess Fiona) – Shrek; Mike Myers (Shrek) – Shrek |

=== Television ===
| Favorite TV Show | Favorite TV Actor |
|---|---|
| **Lizzie McGuire**; 7th Heaven; Buffy the Vampire Slayer; Friends | **Nick Cannon** – The Nick Cannon Show; Matt LeBlanc (Joey Tribbiani) – Friends; Frankie Muniz (Malcolm) – Malcolm in the Middle; Matthew Perry (Chandler Bing) – Friends |
| Favorite TV Actress | Favorite Cartoon |
| **Amanda Bynes** – The Amanda Show; Jennifer Aniston (Rachel Green) – Friends; Hilary Duff (Lizzie McGuire) – Lizzie McGuire; Melissa Joan Hart (Sabrina Spellman) – Sabrina the Teenage Witch | **The Simpsons**; Hey Arnold!; Rugrats; Scooby-Doo |

=== Music ===
| Favorite Male Singer | Favorite Female Singer |
|---|---|
| **Usher**; Bow Wow; Aaron Carter; Lil' Romeo | **P!nk**; Janet Jackson; Jennifer Lopez; Britney Spears |
| Favorite Singing Group | Favorite Band |
| **Destiny's Child**; Backstreet Boys; Dream; *NSYNC | **Baha Men**; Creed; Smash Mouth; Sugar Ray |
Favorite Song
**"Get the Party Started"** – P!nk; "Don't Let Me Be the Last to Know" – Britney Spears; "I'm a Believer" – Smash Mouth; "Pop" – *NSYNC

=== Sports ===
| Favorite Male Athlete | Favorite Female Athlete |
|---|---|
| **Michael Jordan**; Kobe Bryant; Shaquille O'Neal; Tiger Woods | **Michelle Kwan**; Mia Hamm; Serena Williams; Venus Williams |
Favorite Sports Team
**Los Angeles Lakers**; Arizona Diamondbacks; New York Yankees; San Francisco 49ers

=== Miscellaneous ===
| Favorite Video Game | Favorite Book |
|---|---|
| **Mario Kart: Super Circuit**; Backyard Basketball; Crash Bandicoot: The Wrath of Cortex; Harry Potter and the Sorcerer's Stone | **Harry Potter series**; Atlantis: The Lost Empire; Chicken Soup for the Teenage Soul; Shrek! |
| Favorite Male Butt Kicker | Favorite Female Butt Kicker |
| **Jackie Chan (Chief Inspector Yan Naing Lee)** – Rush Hour 2; Antonio Banderas (Gregorio Cortez) – Spy Kids; Chris Tucker (Detective James Carter) – Rush Hour 2; Elijah Wood (Frodo Baggins) – The Lord of the Rings: The Fellowship of the Ring | **Sarah Michelle Gellar (Buffy Summers)** – Buffy the Vampire Slayer; Jessica Alba (Max Guevara) – Dark Angel; Angelina Jolie (Lara Croft) – Lara Croft: Tomb Raider; Zhang Ziyi (Hu Li) – Rush Hour 2 |

=== Wannabe Award ===
- Janet Jackson

== Slimed celebrities ==
- P!nk
- Snowbell (Animated Segment)
- Adam Sandler
