= 1989 Kids' Choice Awards =

Children's television awards show program broadcast in 1989

- Date: June 25, 1989
- Location: Universal Studios Hollywood
- Hosted by: Nicole Eggert; Wil Wheaton

Television/radio coverage
- Network: Nickelodeon
- Produced by: Jim Burns
- Directed by: Michael Bernhaut

The 3rd Annual Nickelodeon Kids' Choice Awards was held on June 25, 1989, at Universal Studios Hollywood. The hosts for the event were Nicole Eggert and Wil Wheaton.

== Appearances ==
- Bobby Heenan
- Danica McKellar
- Jason Hervey
- Chris Young

== Performers ==
- Corey Feldman
- New Kids on the Block

== Winners and nominees ==
Winners are listed first, in bold. Other nominees are in alphabetical order.

=== Movies ===
Favorite Movie	Favorite Movie Actor
**Who Framed Roger Rabbit**; Beetlejuice; Police Academy 5	**Arnold Schwarzenegger** – Twins as Julius Benedict; Eddie Murphy – Coming to America as Prince Akeem; Pee Wee Herman – Big Top Pee-wee as himself
Favorite Movie Actress
**Whoopi Goldberg** – Clara's Heart as Clara Mayfield; Bette Midler – Beaches as C.C. Bloom; Molly Ringwald – For Keeps as Darcy Bobrucz

=== Television ===
Favorite TV Show	Favorite TV Actor
**The Cosby Show**; ALF; Growing Pains	**ALF** – ALF; Kirk Cameron – Growing Pains as Mike Seaver; Michael J. Fox – Family Ties as Alex P. Keaton
Favorite TV Actress
**Alyssa Milano** – Who's the Boss? as Samantha Micelli; Tracey Gold – Growing Pains as Carol Seaver; Holly Robinson – 21 Jump Street as Officer Judy Hoffs

=== Music ===
Favorite Male Musician/Group	Favorite Female Musician/Group
**Bon Jovi**; DJ Jazzy Jeff and the Fresh Prince; The Fat Boys	**Debbie Gibson**; Whitney Houston; Salt-N-Pepa
Favorite Song
**"Kokomo"** – The Beach Boys; "Don't Worry Be Happy" – Bobby McFerrin; "Parents Just Don't Understand" – DJ Jazzy Jeff and the Fresh Prince

=== Sports ===
Favorite Male Athlete	Favorite Female Athlete
**Mike Tyson**; Michael Jordan; Greg Louganis	**Florence Griffith Joyner**; Janet Evans; Chris Evert
Favorite Sports Team
**Chicago Bears**; Detroit Pistons; Los Angeles Dodgers
