= 2001 Kids' Choice Awards =

Children's television awards show program broadcast in 2001

- Date: April 21, 2001
- Location: Santa Monica Airport Barker Hangar, Santa Monica, California
- Hosted by: Rosie O'Donnell

Highlights
- Most awards: How the Grinch Stole Christmas (2)
- Most nominations: Nutty Professor II: The Klumps (3)

Television/radio coverage
- Network: Nickelodeon
- Runtime: 90 min. (with commercials)
- Viewership: 4.23 million
- Produced by: Paul Flattery
- Directed by: Glenn Weiss

The 14th Annual Nickelodeon Kids' Choice Awards was held on April 21, 2001, at Santa Monica Airport's Barker Hangar in Santa Monica, California. It aired live on Nickelodeon and was hosted by Rosie O'Donnell for the sixth consecutive year.

== Winners and nominees ==
=== Movies ===
Favorite Movie	Favorite Movie Actor
Dr. Seuss' How the Grinch Stole Christmas; Big Momma's House; Charlie's Angels; Nutty Professor II: The Klumps	Jim Carrey – Dr. Seuss' How the Grinch Stole Christmas; Tom Cruise – Mission: Impossible II; Martin Lawrence – Big Momma's House; Eddie Murphy – Nutty Professor II: The Klumps
Favorite Movie Actress	Favorite Voice From an Animated Movie
Drew Barrymore – Charlie's Angels; Halle Berry – X-Men; Cameron Diaz – Charlie's Angels; Janet Jackson – Nutty Professor II: The Klumps	Susan Sarandon – Rugrats in Paris: The Movie; Mel Gibson – Chicken Run; Kevin Kline – The Road to El Dorado; David Spade – The Emperor's New Groove

=== Television ===
Favorite TV Show	Favorite TV Actor
Malcolm in the Middle; 7th Heaven; Friends; Sabrina the Teenage Witch	Carson Daly – Total Request Live; Nick Cannon – All That; Drew Carey – The Drew Carey Show; Jamie Foxx – The Jamie Foxx Show
Favorite TV Actress	Favorite Cartoon
Amanda Bynes – The Amanda Show; Brandy – Moesha; Sarah Michelle Gellar – Buffy the Vampire Slayer; Melissa Joan Hart – Sabrina the Teenage Witch	Rugrats; Hey Arnold!; The Powerpuff Girls; The Simpsons

=== Music ===
Favorite Male Singer	Favorite Female Singer
Lil' Bow Wow; Ricky Martin; Sisqo; Will Smith	Britney Spears; Christina Aguilera; Jennifer Lopez; Pink
Favorite Singing Group	Favorite Band
Destiny's Child; Backstreet Boys; Baha Men; *NSYNC	Blink-182; Creed; Dixie Chicks; Red Hot Chili Peppers
Favorite Song
"Who Let the Dogs Out?" – Baha Men; "Bounce with Me" – Lil' Bow Wow; "Bye Bye Bye" – *NSYNC; "Oops... I Did It Again" – Britney Spears

=== Sports ===
Favorite Male Athlete	Favorite Female Athlete
Tony Hawk; Kobe Bryant; Shaquille O'Neal; Tiger Woods	Mia Hamm; Michelle Kwan; Serena Williams; Venus Williams
Favorite Sports Team
Los Angeles Lakers; Atlanta Braves; New York Giants; New York Yankees

=== Miscellaneous ===
Favorite Video Game	Favorite Book
Tony Hawk's Pro Skater 2; Crash Bash; Frogger 2: Swampy's Revenge; Pokémon Gold and Silver	Harry Potter; Animorphs; Bud, Not Buddy; Chicken Soup for the Soul Series
Favorite Rising Star
Aaron Carter – Aaron's Party (Come Get It); Jessica Alba – Dark Angel; Marion Jones – 2000 Summer Olympics; Lucy Liu – Charlie's Angels

=== Wannabe Award ===
- Tom Cruise

== Musical performers ==
- Backstreet Boys - "More than That"
- Aaron Carter - "That's How I Beat Shaq"
- Destiny's Child - "Survivor"
- Lil' Bow Wow - "Bounce With Me"

== Slimed celebrities ==
- *NSYNC: Slimed by O'Donnell from a different location.
- Melissa Joan Hart: Also slimed from a different location.
- Tom Cruise: After accepting the Wannabe Award, O'Donnell asked him to slime the mystery celebrity at the end of the show, and had him press a button to do so; he ended up sliming himself as the 'mystery celebrity', much to his surprise and enjoyment.
- Rosie O'Donnell: O'Donnell joined Cruise in the slime at the end of the show.
