= 1997 Kids' Choice Awards =

Children's television awards show program broadcast in 1997

- Date: April 19, 1997
- Location: Grand Olympic Auditorium
- Hosted by: Rosie O'Donnell

Television/radio coverage
- Network: Nickelodeon
- Viewership: 2.89 million (households)
- Produced by: Mark Offitzer
- Directed by: Glenn Weiss

The 10th Annual Nickelodeon Kids' Choice Awards was held on April 19, 1997, at the Grand Olympic Auditorium in Los Angeles, California. Actress Rosie O'Donnell was the host of the ceremony while Terry Bradshaw served as a guest announcer. The ceremony is also notable for leading into "Born to Be Beavers", the first episode of The Angry Beavers.

== Performers ==
Artist(s)	Song(s)
Savage Garden	"I Want You"
Jewel	"You Were Meant for Me"
Coolio	"The Winner"
Immature	"Watch Me Do My Thing"

== Winners and nominees ==
Winners are listed first, in bold. Other nominees are in alphabetical order.

=== Movies ===
Favorite Movie	Favorite Movie Actor
**Independence Day**; Happy Gilmore; The Nutty Professor; Twister	**Jim Carrey – The Cable Guy as Ernie "Chip" Douglas**; Tom Cruise – Mission: Impossible as Ethan Hunt; Will Smith – Independence Day as Captain Steven Hiller; Robin Williams – Jack as Jack Powell
Favorite Movie Actress
**Rosie O'Donnell – Harriet the Spy as Katherine "Ole Golly"**; Whoopi Goldberg – Eddie as Eddie Franklin; Whitney Houston – The Preacher's Wife as Julia Biggs; Michelle Pfeiffer – One Fine Day as Melanie Parker

=== Television ===
Favorite TV Show	Favorite TV Actor
**Home Improvement**; All That; America's Funniest Home Videos; Goosebumps	**Tim Allen** – Home Improvement as Timothy "Tim" Taylor; Michael J. Fox – Spin City as Mike Flaherty; LL Cool J – In the House as Marion Hill; Jonathan Taylor Thomas – Home Improvement as Randy Taylor
Favorite TV Actress	Favorite Cartoon
**Tia & Tamera Mowry** – Sister, Sister as Tia Landry & Tamera Campbell; Jennifer Aniston – Friends as Rachel Green; Roseanne Barr – Roseanne as Roseanne Conner; Courteney Cox – Friends as Monica Geller	**Rugrats**; Ace Ventura: Pet Detective; Animaniacs; The Simpsons

=== Music ===
Favorite Singer	Favorite Group
**Coolio**; Brandy; LL Cool J; Alanis Morissette	**Fugees**; Boyz II Men; Hootie and the Blowfish; TLC
Favorite Song
**"Killing Me Softly" – Fugees**; "C'mon N' Ride It (The Train)" - Quad City DJ's; "Always Be My Baby" – Mariah Carey; "I Love You Always Forever" - Donna Lewis

=== Sports ===
Favorite Male Athlete	Favorite Female Athlete
**Shaquille O'Neal**; Ken Griffey Jr.; Michael Jordan; Emmitt Smith	**Kristi Yamaguchi**; Dominique Dawes; Shannon Miller; Dominique Moceanu
Favorite Sports Team
**Green Bay Packers**; Chicago Bulls; New York Yankees; Orlando Magic

=== Miscellaneous ===
Favorite Video Game	Favorite Animal Star
**NBA Jam T.E.**; Diddy's Kong-Quest; Super Mario 64; Toy Story	**Pongo** – 101 Dalmatians; Chance – Homeward Bound II: Lost in San Francisco; Flipper – Flipper; Sassy – Homeward Bound II: Lost in San Francisco
Favorite Book
**Matilda** by Roald Dahl; How to Kill a Monster by R. L. Stine; James and the Giant Peach by Roald Dahl; The Girl Who Cried Monster by R. L. Stine

== Hall of Fame ==
- Will Smith
