= Amanda Bynes =

American former actress (born 1986)

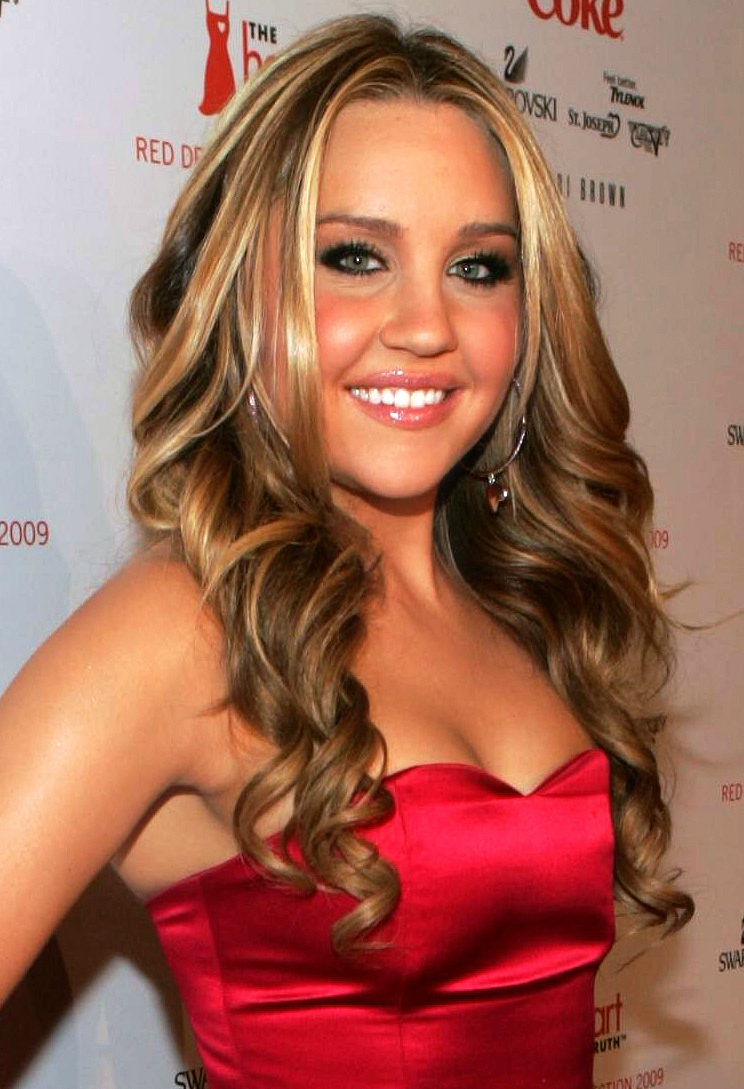
- Bynes in 2009
- Born: Amanda Laura Bynes; April 3, 1986 (age 40); Thousand Oaks, California, U.S.
- Education: Fashion Institute of Design and Merchandising
- Occupation: Actress
- Years active: 1993–2010

Amanda Laura Bynes (born April 3, 1986) is an American retired actress. Bynes began her career as a child actress and received recognition for her roles on the Nickelodeon sketch comedy series All That (1996–2000) and The Amanda Show (1999–2002), both of which she won several Kids' Choice Awards for.

In her mid-teens, Bynes starred in The WB (now The CW) sitcom What I Like About You (2002–2006) and in the teen comedy films Big Fat Liar (2002) and What a Girl Wants (2003). As an adult, she appeared in the films She's the Man (2006), Hairspray (2007), Living Proof (2008), and Easy A (2010), before announcing her retirement from acting.

Upon her retirement from acting in 2010, Bynes publicly struggled with mental health and substance abuse. Her legal problems, which persisted from 2012 to 2014, resulted in her parents being granted conservatorship of her from 2013 to 2022.

== Early life and education ==
Bynes was born on April 3, 1986, and raised in Thousand Oaks, California, a suburb of Los Angeles. Her father is Catholic and is of Irish, Lithuanian, and Polish descent, and her mother is Jewish, born to a Canadian couple whose families were from Poland, Russia, and Romania.

Since childhood, Bynes has been interested in illustration and fashion design. In December 2013, Bynes enrolled at the Fashion Institute of Design and Merchandising (FIDM) in Irvine, California for 2014. In 2018, she received her associate's of art degree in merchandise product development and announced her intentions to start a bachelor's degree program. In 2019, Bynes graduated from FIDM.

== Career ==
=== 1993–2005: Child acting and breakthrough ===
Bynes began professionally acting at age seven, appearing in television advertisements for Buncha Crunch candies, Cut and Style Barbie, and Taco Bell. During her childhood, she appeared on stage in versions of Annie, The Secret Garden, The Music Man, and The Sound of Music. Later, she attended a comedy camp at the Los Angeles Laugh Factory, at which she received advice from Richard Pryor and Arsenio Hall. A Nickelodeon producer spotted her at a performance at the Laugh Factory, which prompted the network to cast her on the sketch comedy series All That, where she played various roles from season three to season six. The show brought Bynes recognition, and garnered her first Kids' Choice Award in 2000. Bynes was also a regular member of the series Figure It Out from 1997 to 1999.

At the age of 13, Bynes received her own spin-off comedy show entitled The Amanda Show, which ran from 1999 to 2002 on Nickelodeon. She had her breakthrough on the show, earning praise and acclaim. She won four Kids' Choice Awards and received two Young Artist Award nominations. In 2002, Bynes made her feature film debut in Big Fat Liar starring as Kaylee, best friend of co-star Frankie Muniz's character. Although the film had a mixed reception, it was a commercial success, and she won another Kids' Choice Award for her performance. Also in 2002, she landed the leading role of Holly Tyler in the WB sitcom What I Like About You, which aired from 2002 to 2006. The series garnered positive reviews and Bynes received a number of nominations from the Teen Choice Awards and the Young Artist Awards.

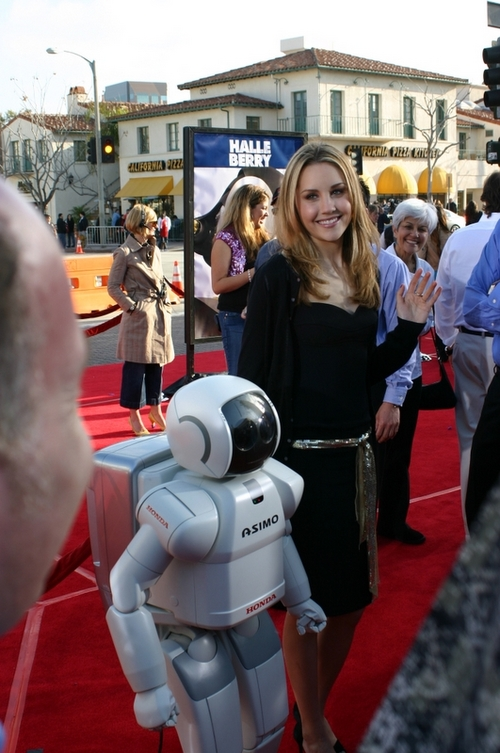
Bynes in 2005, at the premiere of Robots

In 2003, Bynes starred as Daphne Reynolds in her second feature film, What a Girl Wants, alongside Colin Firth. The film received mixed reviews but was a commercial success nonetheless. For the role, she won the Nickelodeon Kids' Choice Award for Favorite Movie Actress. Also that year, she appeared on the cover of Vanity Fair's July 2003 edition. She also had some voice roles in animation films such as the 2003 direct-to-video film Charlotte's Web 2: Wilbur's Great Adventure, which was panned by critics, and as Piper Pinwheeler in the 2005 film Robots, which was a commercial success. Also in 2005, she acted opposite Chris Carmack in the romantic comedy Love Wrecked.

=== 2006–2010: Mainstream stardom and acting retirement ===
Bynes was named one of Teen People's "25 Hottest Stars Under 25" in 2006. Also in 2006, Bynes starred in the teen sports romantic comedy film She's the Man, based on William Shakespeare's Twelfth Night. She portrays Viola Hastings, a girl who pretends to be her twin brother to play with the boys' soccer team at an elite boarding school after the girls soccer team at her school gets cut. Critic Roger Ebert wrote "Of Amanda Bynes let us say that she is sunny and plucky and somehow finds a way to play her impossible role without clearing her throat more than six or eight times. More importantly, we like her."

In 2007, Bynes starred as Penny Pingleton, a sheltered young girl, in the musical comedy film Hairspray, based on the musical theater adaptation of John Waters' 1988 film. The film was a critical and commercial success premiering in over 3,000 theaters, the largest debut for any musical film. It went on to become Bynes's most successful film at the time, and she and the rest of the cast were acclaimed for their performances. She won the Critics' Choice Award and received a Screen Actors Guild Award nomination in 2008, among others. She was also featured on the Hairspray soundtrack, which received a Grammy nomination. It was announced Bynes would reprise her role in Hairspray 2, but the project was canceled. In August 2007, Bynes worked with Steve & Barry's to create her own fashion line called Dear, consisting of apparel and accessories. The line was cut short when Steve & Barry's filed for bankruptcy in 2008.

Bynes' next role was in another comedy, Sydney White, also released in 2007. The film was a critical and commercial failure, although Bynes' performance was praised. Review aggregator site Rotten Tomatoes wrote "Amanda Bynes is charming, but Sydney White is a poorly adapted take on Snow White, relying on tired ethnic stereotypes laughs." In 2008, she appeared in the Lifetime television movie Living Proof as the student assistant of Harry Connick, Jr.'s character. The film and the cast were praised. Also in 2008, Bynes voiced Anna in the Family Guy episode "Long John Peter". In March 2009, Bynes alongside Tim Peper, Stephanie Lemelin, and Baron Vaughn filmed the ABC pilot Canned, where she captured the role of Sarabeth. The workplace comedy followed a group of friends that were all fired on the same day. She was also set to star in the romantic comedy Post Grad, but she dropped out and was replaced by Alexis Bledel amid rumors that she was having difficulties.

In January 2010, Bynes posed for the cover of Maxim for their February issue. In June, Bynes announced via Twitter that she would retire from acting. The following month, she seemingly retracted her previous statement by tweeting, "i've unretired"; and concurrently posted an advertisement for her upcoming film, Easy A, in which she would co-star alongside then-relatively unknown Emma Stone. She played Marianne Bryant, the president of a high school Bible study club who becomes the personal nemesis of Stone's character. The film was a critical and commercial success, with Stone and Bynes receiving critical praise for their performances. In the same year, Bynes started shooting the Farrelly brothers comedy film Hall Pass, but dropped out and was replaced by Alexandra Daddario. In a September 2012 interview, Bynes clarified her acting status, telling People, "I am retired as an actor. I am moving to New York to launch my career. I am going to do a fashion line."

=== 2018–present: Other ventures ===
In June 2018, Bynes considered returning to acting, but nothing has happened since.

In December 2023, Bynes debuted as the co-host of an interview-style podcast, Amanda Bynes & Paul Sieminski: The Podcast, but she left after one episode to "get [her] manicurist license and have a consistent job". In December 2024, she hosted a pop-up art show in West Hollywood, showcasing her collaborative work with fashion designer and artist Austin Babbitt.

In April 2026, Bynes signed with Create Music Group, and released her EDM trap single "Girlfriend" featuring Fenix Flexin.

== Personal life ==
In 2007, Bynes described herself as Jewish and said: "As far as religion, I was raised both. I learned about both [Judaism and Catholicism]. My parents said it was up to me to decide when I grew up. I'm sort of a spiritual person anyway. I haven't decided yet. I don't know yet exactly what I believe."

In 2008, Bynes briefly dated Seth MacFarlane after voicing Anna in the episode "Long John Peter" of MacFarlane's show Family Guy.

Bynes became engaged to Paul Michael in 2020. In July 2022, E! News reported Bynes and Michael had broken up after two years of dating.

=== Mental health, substance abuse, and legal issues ===
In March 2012, Bynes was pulled over by Los Angeles police for talking on the phone while driving. She then left the scene before the officer could finish writing her ticket. However, he did not pursue her as he already had her information. She later returned to the station to sign the ticket.

On April 4, Bynes was arrested for driving under the influence (DUI) in West Hollywood after side-swiping a police car and refusing to take a breathalyzer test. Upon being officially charged in June, Bynes took to Twitter to enlist the help of then-President of the United States Barack Obama after claiming she was wrongfully arrested, writing 'Hey @BarackObama... I don't drink. Please fire the cop who arrested me. I also don't hit and run. The end.' She later accepted a plea bargain of three years probation in exchange for the dismissal of the DUI charge.

In May 2013, Bynes was charged with reckless endangerment and marijuana possession after she was found smoking in the lobby of her Manhattan apartment building. When officers entered her 36th-floor apartment, she allegedly threw a bong out the window. A New York County judge dismissed the case against her in June after no evidence of a bong was ever discovered.

In July, Ventura County, California, sheriff's deputies detained her after she allegedly started a small fire in the driveway of a stranger in Thousand Oaks. She was hospitalized under a 72-hour mental-health evaluation hold. Bynes's parents filed for conservatorship of their daughter shortly after her July 2013 hospitalization began. In August, Bynes's mother was granted a temporary conservatorship over Bynes's affairs.

In October 2014, Bynes accused her father of emotional and sexual abuse in a series of tweets. After her parents protested and claimed innocence, Bynes tweeted that her father had never abused her, adding: "The microchip in my brain made me say those things but he's the one that ordered them to microchip me". Days later, Bynes's mother again received conservatorship of her. Soon afterward, Bynes announced that she had been diagnosed with bipolar disorder. In August 2018, paperwork was filed to continue the conservatorship until August 2020.

In 2018, Bynes stated she had been sober for four years with the help of her parents. She apologized for what she said on Twitter during her years of substance use challenges: "I'm really ashamed and embarrassed with the things I said. I can't turn back time but if I could, I would. And I'm so sorry to whoever I hurt and whoever I lied about because it truly eats away at me." In an interview, Bynes stated that during her days of substance use she used cocaine and MDMA, but the drug she "abused the most" was the ADHD prescription medication Adderall.

In February 2022, Bynes filed to end her conservatorship. Her attorney stated that Bynes believed her condition was improved and protection of the court was no longer necessary. Attorneys for her parents stated that they supported her in ending it. The conservatorship was officially terminated on March 22, 2022.

On March 20, 2023, Bynes was placed on a 72-hour psychiatric hold after she flagged a bystander for help and called 911 following a psychotic episode in Los Angeles. The previous weekend she had been scheduled to appear at an All That panel at '90s Con in Connecticut, her first scheduled public event since the end of her conservatorship, but she did not appear. On June 17, 2023, after she called the police indicating that she had thoughts of self-harm, mental health professionals determined that she needed inpatient treatment. She left the facility on June 30 with plans for follow-up outpatient treatment.

== Filmography ==
=== Film ===
Year	Title	Role	Notes
2002	Big Fat Liar	Kaylee Garrett	
2003	Charlotte's Web 2: Wilbur's Great Adventure	Nellie	Voice role; direct-to-video
2003	What a Girl Wants	Daphne Reynolds	
2005	Robots	Piper Pinwheeler	Voice role
2005	Love Wrecked	Jenny Taylor	
2006	She's the Man	Viola Hastings	
2007	Hairspray	Penny Lou Pingleton	
2007	Sydney White	Sydney White	
2010	Easy A	Marianne Bryant	

=== Television ===
Year	Title	Role	Notes
1996–2000	All That	Various roles	Main role
1997–1999	Figure It Out	Herself	Panelist
1998	Blue's Clues	Herself	Episode: "Blue's Birthday"
1999	Arli$$	Crystal Dupree	Episode: "Our Past, Our Present, Our Future"
1999–2002	The Amanda Show	Host / Various roles	Lead role
2000	Crashbox	Pink Robot	Episode: "Amanda Bynes"
2000	Double Dare 2000	Herself	Contestant; 2 episodes
2001	The Drew Carey Show	Sketch player	Episode: "Drew Carey's Back-to-School Rock 'n' Roll Comedy Hour"
2001	The Nightmare Room	Danielle Warner	Episode: "Don't Forget Me"
2001–2002	Rugrats	Taffy	Recurring voice role
2002–2006	What I Like About You	Holly Tyler	Lead role
2008	Family Guy	Anna	Voice role; episode: "Long John Peter"
2008	Living Proof	Jamie	Television film

=== Podcast ===
Year	Title	Role	Notes
2023	Amanda Bynes & Paul Sieminski: The Podcast	Herself	Creator and co-host; 1 episode

== Discography ==
=== Singles ===
List of soundtrack appearances
Title	Year	Album
"Diamonds" (with Paul Michael)	2022	Non-album single
"Fairfax" (with Paul Michael)	2022	Non-album single
"Girlfriend" (with Zabba and Fenix Flexin)	2026	Non-album single

=== Soundtrack appearances ===
List of soundtrack appearances
Title	Year	Album
"Without Love" (with Zac Efron, Nikki Blonsky, and Elijah Kelley)	2007	Hairspray: Soundtrack to the Motion Picture
"You Can't Stop the Beat" (with the cast of Hairspray) (Note: with Nikki Blonsky, Zac Efron, Elijah Kelley, John Travolta, Queen Latifah, Michelle Pfeiffer, Christopher Walken, James Marsden, Taylor Parks and Brittany Snow)	2007	Hairspray: Soundtrack to the Motion Picture

== Awards and nominations ==
At the Kids' Choice Awards, Bynes is one of nine actors to win Favorite Movie Actress more than once.

Year	Organization	Award	Work	Result	Ref.
1997	CableACE Awards	Actress in a Comedy Series	All That	Nominated	
2000	Kids' Choice Awards	Favorite Female TV Star	All That	Won	
2000	Kids' Choice Awards	Favorite Female TV Star	The Amanda Show	Won	
2000	Young Artist Awards	Best Performance in a TV Comedy Series: Leading Young Actress	The Amanda Show	Nominated	
2000	YoungStar Awards	Best Young Actress/Performance in a Comedy TV Series	The Amanda Show	Nominated	
2001	Kids' Choice Awards	Favorite Female TV Star	The Amanda Show	Won	
2001	Young Artist Awards	Best Performance in a TV Comedy Series: Leading Young Actress	The Amanda Show	Nominated	
2002	Kids' Choice Awards	Favorite Female TV Star	The Amanda Show	Won	
2002	Teen Choice Awards	Film: Choice Chemistry	Big Fat Liar	Nominated	
2003	Teen Choice Awards	Choice TV Actress: Comedy	What I Like About You	Nominated	
2003	Teen Choice Awards	Choice Female Hottie	—N/a	Nominated	
2003	Young Artist Awards	Best Performance in a Feature Film: Leading Young Actress	Big Fat Liar	Nominated	
2003	Kids' Choice Awards	Favorite Movie Actress	Big Fat Liar	Won	
2003	Kids' Choice Awards	Favorite Female TV Star	The Amanda Show	Won	
2004	Young Artist Awards	Best Performance in a TV Series (Comedy or Drama): Leading Young Actress	What I Like About You	Nominated	
2004	Teen Choice Awards	Choice TV Actress: Comedy	What I Like About You	Nominated	
2004	Kids' Choice Awards	Favorite Movie Actress	What a Girl Wants	Won	
2005	Teen Choice Awards	Choice TV Actress: Comedy	What I Like About You	Nominated	
2006	Teen Choice Awards	Choice Liplock	She's the Man	Nominated	
2007	Hollywood Film Festival	Ensemble of the Year	Hairspray	Won	
2008	Critics' Choice Awards	Best Acting Ensemble	Hairspray	Won	
2008	Screen Actors Guild Awards	Outstanding Performance by a Cast in a Motion Picture	Hairspray	Nominated	
2008	Palm Springs International Film Festival	Ensemble Cast Award	Hairspray	Nominated	
2011	MTV Movie Awards	Best Line From a Movie	Easy A	Nominated	
