= 1988 Kids' Choice Awards =

Children's television awards show program broadcast in 1988

- Date: April 18, 1988
- Location: Universal Studios Hollywood
- Hosted by: Tony Danza; Debbie Gibson; Brian Robbins; Dan Schneider
- Website: http://www.nick.com/kids-choice-awards

Television/radio coverage
- Network: Nickelodeon
- Produced by: Kac Young
- Directed by: Jon Merdin

The 2nd Annual Nickelodeon Kids' Choice Awards was held on April 18, 1988, from the Conan Sword and Sorcery Spectacular Arena at Universal Studios Hollywood. This was the first event held under this title, and first to feature a live audience, as well as celebrity hosts and attendees, while the first ceremony occurred the previous year in 1987 as The Big Ballot, and only featured taped segments linked together by its studio hosts. The show also featured the first "KCA trophy", which was created by original logo designers Tom Corey and Scott Nash.

== Performers ==
- The Fat Boys ("Wipe Out")
- Debbie Gibson ("Shake Your Love" and "Out of the Blue")

== Presenters ==
- Wil Wheaton and Staci Keanan - presented Favorite Movie Actor and Favorite Movie Actress
- Tiffany Brissette and Danny Pintauro - presented Favorite Sports Team and Favorite Male Athlete
- Amanda Peterson and Rob Stone - presented Favorite TV Actor and Favorite TV Actress via video
- Josie Davis and Mackenzie Astin - presented Favorite Female Vocalist and Favorite Male Vocalist

The awards for Favorite Movie, Favorite Female Athlete, Favorite TV Show and Favorite Song were presented by co-hosts Debbie Gibson, Brian Robbins and Dan Schneider in small vignettes throughout the show. In addition, Wesley Eure and Charles Barkley revealed the winner for Favorite Female Athlete in a small Finders Keepers segment.

== Winners and nominees ==
Winners are listed first, in bold. Other nominees are in alphabetical order.

=== Movies ===
Favorite Movie	Favorite Movie Actor
**Beverly Hills Cop II**; Adventures in Babysitting; La Bamba	**Eddie Murphy** – Beverly Hills Cop II as Detective Axel Foley; Arnold Schwarzenegger – The Running Man as Ben Richards; Patrick Swayze – Dirty Dancing as Johnny Castle
Favorite Movie Actress
**Whoopi Goldberg** – Fatal Beauty as Detective Rita Rizzoli; Shelley Long – Hello Again as Lucy Chadman; Elisabeth Shue – Adventures in Babysitting as Chris Parker

=== Television ===
Favorite TV Show	Favorite TV Actor
**ALF**; The Cosby Show; Growing Pains	**Michael J. Fox** – Family Ties as Alex P. Keaton; Kirk Cameron – Growing Pains as Mike Seaver; Bill Cosby – The Cosby Show as Dr. Heathcliff "Cliff" Huxtable
Favorite TV Actress
**Alyssa Milano** – Who's the Boss? as Samantha Micelli; Tempestt Bledsoe – The Cosby Show as Vanessa Huxtable; Anne Schedeen – ALF as Kate Tanner

=== Music ===
Favorite Male Vocalist	Favorite Female Vocalist
**Bon Jovi**; The Fat Boys; The Monkees	**Madonna**; The Bangles; Janet Jackson
Favorite Song
**"La Bamba"** – Los Lobos; "Control" – Janet Jackson; "I Wanna Dance With Somebody" – Whitney Houston

=== Sports ===
Favorite Male Athlete	Favorite Female Athlete
**Hulk Hogan**; Michael Jordan; Walter Payton	**Debi Thomas**; Chris Evert; Kristie Phillips
Favorite Sports Team
**Chicago Bears**; Detroit Pistons; San Francisco Giants
