= 1991 Kids' Choice Awards =

Children's television awards show program broadcast in 1991

- Date: April 22, 1991
- Hosted by: Corin Nemec

Television/radio coverage
- Network: Nickelodeon

The 5th Annual Nickelodeon Kids' Choice Awards was held on April 22, 1991. The show was hosted by Corin Nemec. The 1991 Kids' Choice Awards introduced the KCA Hall of Fame Award.

== Winners and nominees ==
Below is a partial list of nominees and complete list of winners. Winners are listed first, in bold. Other nominees are in alphabetical order.

=== Movies ===
Favorite Movie	Favorite Movie Actor
**Home Alone**; House Party; Teenage Mutant Ninja Turtles	**Arnold Schwarzenegger** – Kindergarten Cop as John Kimble; Johnny Depp; Eddie Murphy
Favorite Movie Actress
**Julia Roberts** – Pretty Woman as Vivian Ward; Kirstie Alley; Whoopi Goldberg

=== Television ===
Favorite TV Show	Favorite TV Actor
**The Simpsons**; In Living Color; The Fresh Prince of Bel-Air	**Will Smith** – The Fresh Prince of Bel-Air as Will Smith; Bill Cosby – The Cosby Show as Cliff Huxtable; Kirk Cameron – Growing Pains as Mike Seaver
Favorite TV Actress
**Keshia Knight Pulliam** – The Cosby Show as Rudy Huxtable; Kirstie Alley – Cheers as Rebecca Howe; Roseanne Barr – Roseanne as Roseanne Conner

=== Music ===
Favorite Male Musician/Group	Favorite Female Musician/Group
**Vanilla Ice**; Bell Biv Devoe; MC Hammer	**Paula Abdul**; Janet Jackson; Madonna
Favorite Song
**"Ice Ice Baby"** – Vanilla Ice; "Step by Step" – New Kids on the Block; "U Can't Touch This" – MC Hammer

=== Sports ===
Favorite Male Athlete	Favorite Female Athlete
**Michael Jordan**; Bo Jackson; Joe Montana	**Jennifer Capriati**; Steffi Graf; Jackie Joyner-Kersee
Favorite Sports Team
**San Francisco 49ers**; Cincinnati Reds; Detroit Pistons

== Special Recognitions ==
=== Hall of Fame ===
- Paula Abdul
  - Arnold Schwarzenegger
  - Michael Jordan
