= Bernie McCullough =

Fictional character

Bernard Jeffrey McCullough
- 'The Bernie Mac Show' character
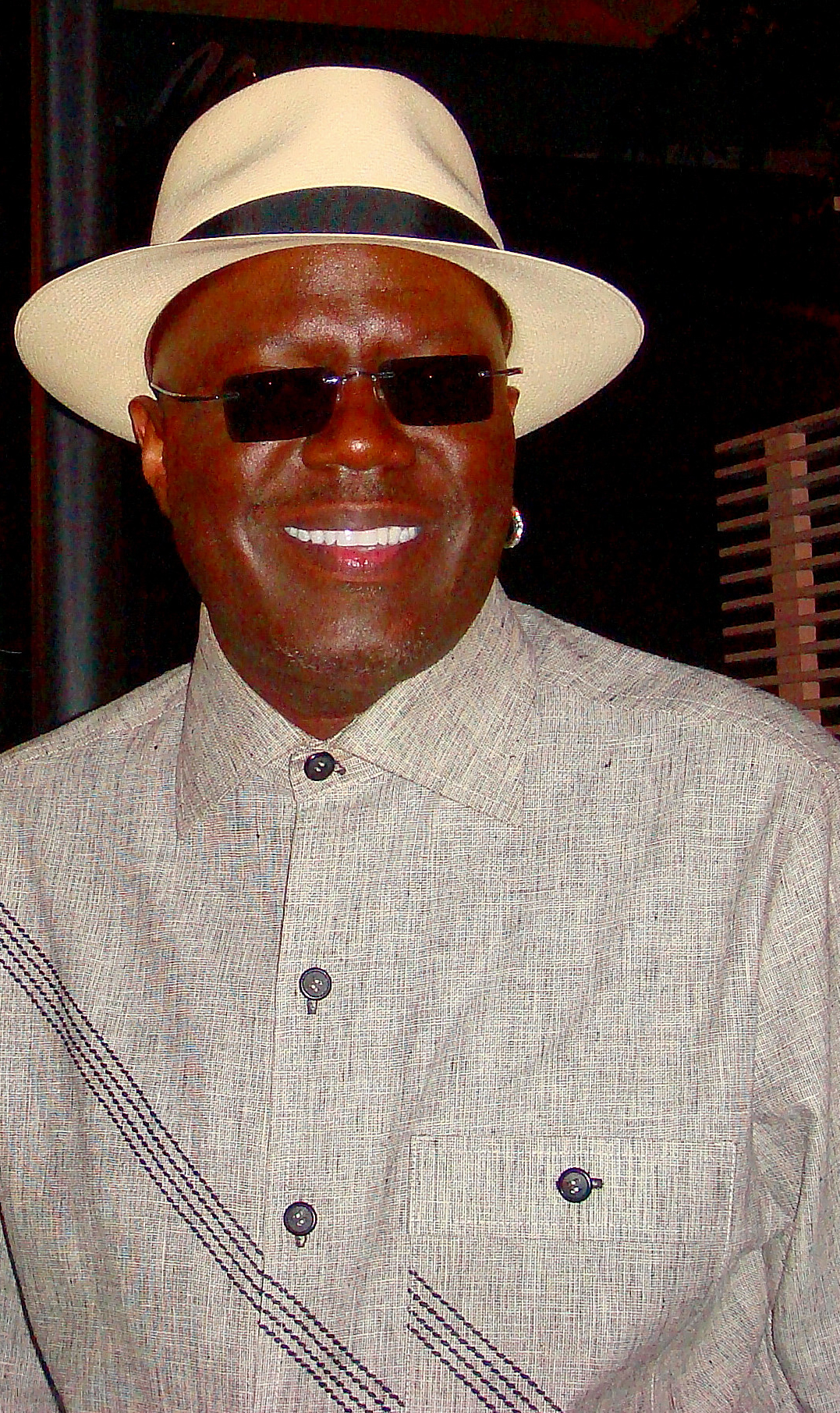
- Bernie Mac plays Bernie McCullough
- First appearance: "Pilot" (2001)
- Last appearance: "Bernie's Angels" (2006)
- Created by: Bernie Mac; Larry Wilmore
- Portrayed by: Bernie Mac

In-universe information
- Alias: Bernie Mac (stage name)
- Occupation: Actor; Comedian
- Family: Big Mama (mother; deceased; first mentioned in Sweet Home Chicago, Part One) "Mama Lena (aunt); Uncle Ellister (father; deceased; born Ellister Bernard Dower); Carl McCullough (maternal half-brother) Benita "B" McCullough (maternal half-sister); Stacy Thomkins (maternal half-sister); Darryl McCullough (maternal half-brother; shown in Sweet Home Chicago, Part One); Vanessa Thomkins (half-niece); Bryana "Baby Girl" Thomkins (half-niece); Jordan Thomkins (half-nephew); Aunt Sis (aunt); David (uncle); Cousin Lou (cousin); Shonte (cousin); T-Bone (cousin); Aunt Livia (aunt); Cousin D (cousin/paternal half-brother); Unknown stepfather (alleged father; first mentioned in Sweet Home Chicago, Part Two); Lloyd Thomas (father-in-law); Leora Thomas (mother-in-law); Valerie (sister-in-law); Unnamed brother-in-law (Vanessa and Jordan's father)
- Spouse: Wanda McCullough (née Thomas)

Bernie "Mac" McCullough (born Bernard Jeffrey McCullough) is a fictional character loosely based on comic actor Bernie Mac from the Fox sitcom The Bernie Mac Show, which ran from 2001 to 2006.

== Character biography ==
Bernard Jeffrey McCullough was born in Chicago, Illinois and raised by his mother, "Big Mama". He barely knew his father and he had two sisters, Bernita (Niecy Nash) and Stacy, and an older brother, Carl (Glynn Turman), and a younger brother, Darryl. In the episode "Sweet Home Chicago, Part Two", Bernie discovers that his father was really his "Uncle" Ellister (In that same episode, he mentions to his niece that his father showed up at his birthday party asking for money. Since his "Uncle Ellister" was his actual father this would make the man he was talking about his stepfather). He decided he wanted to be a comedian. While delivering a package to a friendly customer (who was actually his future father in law, Lloyd), he met his future wife, Wanda (Kellita Smith). He had a rough start but he eventually won her heart and they later married in 1996. When Bernie's career took off they moved to Los Angeles. During that time, Bernie lived a happy life with his beautiful wife throughout a five-year period. In the pilot, he has to take in his sisters three children: Jordan (Jeremy Suarez), Bryana (Dee Dee Davis) and Vanessa (Camille Winbush). At first his patience is put to the test on a daily basis from Vanessa's attitude and Jordan's insecurities, but as the show progressed, he began to love and support the children as if they were his own.

He frequently threatens to beat his children, saying things like, "Bust yo head 'til the white meat shows!" and "Excuse me, America...I gotta go stunt one of them kids growth". Mac would always speak to the audience and address them as "America". The show is somewhat of a spoof of a reality series.

In the series finale, he gets an electrical shock and when he recovers he worries what will happen to his "Angels" if something happened to him. He decides to teach Jordan how to be more masculine (including teaching him how to make a "Mac Sandwich") and Bryana how to be more careful of the things she uses (which was the cause of his shock, because she put a Baked potato wrapped in aluminum foil in the microwave and when he foolishly tried to cut it off, he was electrocuted). Vanessa finally finds a college but does not want him to be involved. With Wanda's advice, Vanessa changes her feelings towards her uncle and they reconcile. Bernie discovers that Jordan has been taking advantage of his kindness and in the final scene of the series, Bernie takes back the iPod he bought him.

Unlike the real Bernie Mac, Bernie McCullough (the TV character) was married with no children; however, in real life, Bernie Mac was married with one daughter. Bernie Mac did not look after his sister's three children after his daughter left home. Bernie Mac did not have a sister in real life. Bernie Mac only had brothers in real life.

From 2005 until 2009, the character Bernie was one of the official U'z Guys on Chicago's television station The U. The U'z Guys is a lineup of all the male main characters from the station's television programs. Bernie was removed from the lineup when The Bernie Mac Show was removed from the station's schedule.

== Relationship with family ==
Bernie uses tough-love parenting tactics and he can be both strict and comical. He narrates the series, and between scenes he talks to the audience by addressing them as "America." Although he loves all three kids, he favorites Bryana (whom he affectionately calls "Baby Girl" because she is the youngest), occasionally tries to get Jordan to act more masculine rather than be himself, and always finds himself going head to head with teenage Vanessa, the eldest sibling, whose poor attitude always gives him a hard time; though it is revealed in the episode "Jack & Jacqueline" that the reason he's so hard on her is because she reminds him of her mother and he's determined to keep her from suffering a similar fate as her mother.

== Reception ==
=== Critical response ===
The character and Bernie Mac's performance have received widespread critical acclaim throughout the series' run. Many viewers have called the character an exceptionally liked lead and critics have associated most of the show's success to Mac. Bernie McCullough was ranked No. 47 in TV Guide's list of the "50 Greatest TV Dads of All Time".

=== Awards and nominations ===
Bernie Mac received various individual awards and nominations for his performance as Bernie McCullough. Mac was nominated for 2 consecutive Primetime Emmy Awards for Outstanding Lead Actor in a Comedy Series in 2002 and 2003 but lost to Ray Romano as Ray Barone in Everybody Loves Raymond and Tony Shalhoub as Adrian Monk in Monk, respectively. In 2002, Mac won the award for Individual Achievement in Comedy.

Mac won the PRISM Award for Performance in a Comedy Series and the BET Comedy Award for Outstanding Lead Actor in a Comedy Series. At the annual Golden Globe Awards, Mac was nominated for 2 consecutive Golden Globe Awards for Best Actor in a Comedy or Musical Television Series in 2003 & 2004 but lost to Shalhoub and Ricky Gervais as David Brent in The Office, respectively.

Additionally, Mac was nominated for 4 consecutive Nickelodeon Kids Choice Awards for Favorite TV Actor. He received 4 consecutive NAACP Image Awards for Outstanding Actor in a Comedy Series. Mac was also nominated in 2007 but lost to Tyler James Williams as Chris in Everybody Hates Chris. Mac has been nominated three times consecutively for the Satellite Award for Best Actor - Television Series Musical or Comedy in 2002, 2003, and 2004, winning in 2002 and 2003, but lost in 2004 to Jason Bateman as Michael Bluth in Arrested Development.
