= The Bernie Mac Show =

American sitcom (2001–2006)

- Season 1 DVD cover
- Genre: Sitcom
- Created by: Larry Wilmore
- Starring: Bernie Mac; Kellita Smith; Jeremy Suarez; Dee Dee Davis; Camille Winbush
- Composer: Stanley A. Smith
- Country of origin: United States
- Original language: English
- No. of seasons: 5
- No. of episodes: 104 (list of episodes)

Production
- Executive producers: Larry Wilmore; Bernie Mac; Warren Hutcherson; Steve Tompkins; Pete Aronson; Michael Borkow
- Producers: Steven Greener; Michael Petok; Teri Schaffer; Bernie Mac; Marc Abrams; Michael Benson; Jerry Collins; Kate Angelo; Ken Kwapis; Reginald Hudlin
- Camera setup: Single-camera
- Running time: 30 minutes
- Production companies: Wilmore Films; Regency Television; 20th Century Fox Television

Original release
- Network: Fox
- Release: November 14, 2001 – April 14, 2006

The Bernie Mac Show (often shortened to Bernie Mac in syndication and promos) is an American sitcom television series created by Larry Wilmore, that aired on Fox for five seasons from November 14, 2001, to April 14, 2006. The series featured Bernie Mac and his wife Wanda raising his sister's three kids: Jordan, Vanessa, and Bryana.

== Premise ==
The series was loosely based on Mac's stand-up comedy acts. In real life, Bernie "Mac" McCullough was married with one daughter; Mac's character on the show (a stand-up comedian) was married with no children of his own. The pilot episode, aired on November 14, 2001, set up the basic premise for the series: the character Bernie Mac takes in his sister's children after she enters rehab (a fictional premise taken from one of Mac's stand-up routines which was eventually featured in the 2000 film, The Original Kings of Comedy). "In reality, the story is a blend of two real incidents: Mac briefly took in his niece Toya who was an at risk youth and her daughter Monique; a friend of his had to raise her sister's children long-term."

Much of the humor in the show was derived from Mac's continual adjustment to and his unique take on parenthood. A frequent motif of the show was the juxtaposition of Mac's acerbic comments, such as his threats to "bust the (children's) heads 'til the white meat shows," and the parental affection he felt toward the trio, which often brought him to the verge of tears. Toward the end of the series, Bryana's long-lost father (Anthony Anderson) returns and drops by occasionally to help Bernie and Wanda with the kids.

Many of his most emotional scenes occurred in segments in which Mac, while still in character, broke the 'fourth wall' and talked to the television audience, which he referred to as "America". This technique was notably used before an episode during the 2005–2006 season, when Bernie, as himself and wearing a Chicago White Sox cap and jacket, delivered a heartfelt congratulatory message to the baseball organization and its staff on their recent World Series Championship. Mac, who grew up on Chicago's south-side, was a die-hard fan of the White Sox and was seen at Game 1 of the World Series, in a front row seat.

The show also features yellow captions pointing things out that aren't explicitly mentioned.

Mac's character's celebrity worked as a plot device allowing other celebrities to appear on the show as themselves, including Halle Berry, Serena Williams, Chris Rock, Ashton Kutcher, Billy Crystal, Carl Reiner, Don Rickles, Angela Bassett, Ellen DeGeneres, Ice Cube, Isaac Hayes, Flavor Flav, Lucy Lawless, Stone Cold Steve Austin, Triple H, Matt Damon, Charles Barkley, Jon Garland, Jules Sylvester, Sugar Ray Leonard, India Arie, Shaquille O'Neal, Sugar Shane Mosley, Hugh Hefner, Phil McGraw, Jay Leno, and Marcus Allen.

== Episodes ==
Season	Episodes	Originally released	
Season	Episodes	First released	Last released
1	22	November 14, 2001	May 15, 2002
2	22	September 18, 2002	May 14, 2003
3	22	November 30, 2003	June 29, 2004
4	16	September 8, 2004	April 8, 2005
5	22	September 23, 2005	April 14, 2006

== Characters ==
=== Main ===
- Bernard "Bernie" McCullough (Bernie Mac) – The show's main character who is loosely based on Mac. Bernie and his wife take in the three kids when their drug-addicted mother (Bernie's sister Stacey) is no longer able to be a proper parent. Bernie uses tough-love parenting tactics and he can be both strict and comical. He narrates the series, and between scenes, he talks to the audience by addressing them as "America". Although he loves all three kids, his favorite is Bryana (whom he affectionately calls "Babygirl" because she is the youngest), and finds himself in conflict with teenage Vanessa, the eldest sibling, who has a poor attitude.
- Wanda McCullough (née Thomas) (Kellita Smith) – Bernie's loving wife, an intelligent woman who is vice president for AT&T, and later in the series, vice president at the fictional West Coast Wireless. She enjoys raising the kids with Bernie, but periodically her patience is tested. Whenever Bernie has a problem, she does her best to help, though her assistance can be overbearing and unnecessary at times.
- Jordan Thomkins (Jeremy Suarez) – Bernie and Wanda's nephew and the middle child. Jordan is very mischievous and peculiar. He is interested in collecting bugs and conducting odd science experiments. Early in the series, he gets beat up by his little sister, Bryana, and he would frequently cry, occasionally vomit, and sometimes urinate on himself. As the series progresses, he becomes emotionally tougher and gains confidence.
- Bryana "Baby Girl" Thomkins (Dee Dee Davis) – Bernie and Wanda's younger niece, the youngest child, and the half-sister of Jordan and Vanessa. Bryana is a friendly child who is sweet, innocent, and naive, though she is often more bratty and obnoxious as the series progresses. Bryana is her uncle's favorite, and has a trusting relationship with her Uncle Bernie. Bernie fears that one day she will grow up and end up like Vanessa.
- Vanessa "Nessa" Thomkins (Camille Winbush) – Bernie and Wanda's elder niece, and the eldest of the three children. Vanessa purposely gives Bernie trouble with her attitude, most of which comes from the pressure of being the eldest and having to take a parental role with her younger siblings. As the series progresses, she gets along better with Bernie.

=== Recurring ===
- W.B. (Reginald Ballard), Bernie's close friend who's always on his side
- Bonita (Niecy Nash), Bernie's younger sister (seasons 2–4)
- Chuy (Carlos Mencia (season 1) and Lombardo Boyar), Bernie's friend
- Kelly (Michael Ralph), Bernie's friend
- Jerry Best (Rick Hoffman), Bernie's manager
- Father Sean Cronin (Wade Williams), the Dean of Discipline at Damien Elementary, Jordan and Bryana's school
- Bryan (Anthony Anderson), Bryana's father (season 5)
- Donna (Naya Rivera), Vanessa's friend
- Teri (Ashley Monique Clark), Vanessa's friend (guest, season 3; recurring, seasons 4–5)

=== Unseen characters ===
- Stacey Thomkins – One of two of Bernie's sisters and Vanessa, Jordan, and Bryana's mother. Before the events of the show, she became addicted to drugs; Bernie had to place her in an institution to recover and took in her children until the time came she could care for them herself. Though institutionalized, Stacey's addiction was such that she was not known to make any serious attempts to recover and her children remain with Bernie for the run of the series. A picture of her younger self is seen once in "Road to Traditions".
- Mr. Thomkins – Vanessa and Jordan's biological father, who left them when she was five years of age and he was a baby. According to Bernie and Vanessa, he's in prison for various law violations that include gun violence. A picture of him (played by an unknown man) is shown in the episode "Saving Sergeant Thomkins".
- Big Mama – Bernie's grandmother. She died sometime before Bernie became famous. She is frequently mentioned by Bernie over the course of the series. In the family reunion episode, Bebe Drake played the matriarchal role.
- Uncle Ellister – Bernie's uncle who is, in actuality, his biological father

== Broadcast history ==
The series debuted in its time slot on November 14, 2001, with solid ratings in spite of a weak lead-in, Grounded for Life. The show had a very successful first season and in the process won a handful of honors including an Emmy Award for "Outstanding Writing for a Comedy Series" and the prestigious Peabody Award. Bernie Mac also received Emmy and Golden Globe nominations for Best Actor in a Comedy Series.

In fall 2002, the series aired against the Damon Wayans comedy My Wife and Kids which may have hurt the show's momentum in the ratings during the first half of its second season run. Larry Wilmore, the show's creator and executive producer, was fired at this time. In interviews, Wilmore said he was fed up with the network's creative interference with the show, in addition to Fox constantly shuffling it around the schedule. Fox contended that it wasn't happy with the show's direction under Wilmore in the second season, claiming the show "wasn't delivering enough laughs". With The Bernie Mac Show's inability to topple My Wife and Kids in the Wednesday 8 p.m. timeslot, Fox eventually aired the show after American Idol, after which it received its highest ratings ever.

The third season was scheduled to start on October 29, 2003, but was postponed due to The O.C. being moved. Instead, the series started the season at the late date of November 30, 2003. The ratings were mediocre, despite the large ratings of its lead-in The Simpsons. In March 2004, the show was moved to Monday nights in a plan to boost ratings for the new show Cracking Up, but the ratings were low for both shows. Cracking Up was canceled and The Bernie Mac Show was pulled from May Sweeps with leftover episodes that aired in June (one of which included an episode about Thanksgiving).

The Bernie Mac Show returned to its original time slot on September 8, 2004, to start the fourth season. The production was shut down a month later due to Bernie's sickness. The show returned on January 14, 2005, with new episodes on Friday nights. Although the ratings were low enough that commentators questioned the show's future (especially when it was postponed from May Sweeps again), the show was renewed for a fifth season.

The fifth season started September 23, 2005, on Friday nights and beginning mid-season, airings were followed by reruns of the show. The show celebrated its 100th episode on February 3, 2006, even though the actual 100th episode was not aired until March 31.

=== Cancellation ===
After five seasons and 104 episodes, Fox announced the cancellation of The Bernie Mac Show.

The series finale titled "Bernie's Angels" focused on Bernie getting an electrical shock and ending up traumatized. After he recovers, he begins to teach Jordan and Bryanna how to do certain things on their own. Also, Vanessa doesn't want Bernie to be involved in her choosing a college. Meanwhile, Jordan takes advantage of Bernie's kindness. In the end, Vanessa and Bernie make up (mainly due to her writing an essay about who inspires her most: which is him). In the final scene of the series, Bernie goes back to his normal self and takes back the iPod he bought Jordan since he was taking advantage of him. Bernie's final line is a farewell message to the viewers and stating that he is going to continue to raise and teach the kids for as long as they need it and he also wishes the viewers luck. The scene pans out with Jordan on his knees sobbing and begging for the iPod while Bernie smugly laughs and teases him.

=== Syndication and international broadcast ===
The series had been airing in syndication since September 2005 and aired on Independent, Fox, UPN and The WB affiliates (the letter networks The WB 100+ Station Group (now The CW Plus) also carries the program as part of its national schedule) and was on the FX network from September 2008 until 2011. In syndication, the series' title is shortened simply to Bernie Mac. Bernie Mac's hometown of Chicago aired the series on the city's independent station WCIU The U. The Bernie Mac Show began its run on the station in September 2005. In the beginning of fall 2009, the series briefly moved to The U's sister station Me-TV, before returning to The U where it remained until late 2010. It also formerly aired reruns on BET, BET Her, Laff, MTV2 and TV One. It currently airs on Bounce TV and Aspire TV.

On the day of Mac's funeral, The U aired a retrospective TV special called A Tribute to Bernie Mac, which featured clips from the series and an interview with Camille Winbush, who portrayed Vanessa.

Reruns of the show were also aired on Much in Canada. The show aired in Jamaica on CVM Television.

== Home media ==
DVD name	Release date	Ep #	Additional information
Season 1	May 4, 2004	22	Bonus features include commentary on the pilot episode from Bernie Mac and a 60-minute A & E Tvography.

The Season One DVD box set was released on DVD May 4, 2004.

== Reception ==
=== American ratings ===
Season	Timeslot (EDT)	Season premiere	Season finale	TV season	Rank	Viewers (in millions)
1	Wednesday 9:00 P.M. (November 14, 2001 – May 15, 2002)	November 14, 2001	May 15, 2002	2001–2002	#63	9.5
2	Wednesday 8:00 P.M. (September 18, 2002 – December 11, 2002); Wednesday 9:00 P.M. (January 15, 2003 – May 14, 2003)	September 18, 2002	May 14, 2003	2002–2003	#60	10.0
3	Sunday 8:30 P.M. (November 30, 2003 – March 14, 2004); Monday 8:00 P.M. (March 22, 2004 – April 26, 2004); Tuesday 8:00 P.M. (June 15, 2004 – June 29, 2004)	November 30, 2003	June 29, 2004	2003–2004	#95	7.5
4	Wednesday 9:00 P.M. (September 8, 2004 – September 29, 2004); Friday 8:00 P.M. (January 14, 2005 – April 8, 2005)	September 8, 2004	April 8, 2005	2004–2005	#110	4.8
5	Friday 8:00 P.M. (September 23, 2005 – April 14, 2006)	September 23, 2005	April 14, 2006	2005–2006	#130	3.6

=== Awards and nominations ===
The Bernie Mac Show won a Peabody Award in 2001, the Humanitas Prize, a Primetime Emmy Award, three NAACP Image Awards for Outstanding Comedy Series, and was honored by the Television Critics Association.

For his role in the show, Bernie Mac was honored by the Television Critics Association for Individual Achievement in a Comedy as well as the NAACP Image Award for Outstanding Actor in a Comedy Series four years in a row: 2003, 2004, 2005, and 2006.
