= Kids' Choice Award for Favorite Song =

Award at the Nickelodeon Kids' Choice Awards

This is a list of the winners of, and nominees for, the Kids' Choice Award for Favorite Song, given at the Nickelodeon Kids' Choice Awards. It was also titled 'Favorite Song Of The Year' from 2015 to 2016.

== Winners and nominees ==
The winning songs are listed in bold.

Year	Winners	Nominees
1988	**"La Bamba"** – Los Lobos	"Control" – Janet Jackson; "I Wanna Dance With Somebody" – Whitney Houston
1989	**"Kokomo"** – The Beach Boys	"Don't Worry Be Happy" – Bobby McFerrin; "Parents Just Don't Understand" – DJ Jazzy Jeff & the Fresh Prince
1990	**"Hangin' Tough"** – New Kids on the Block	"Every Little Step" – Bobby Brown; "Girl You Know It's True" – Milli Vanilli
1991	**"Ice Ice Baby"** – Vanilla Ice	"Step by Step" – New Kids on the Block; "U Can't Touch This" – MC Hammer
1992	**"Jump"** – Kris Kross	"Ain't 2 Proud 2 Beg" – TLC; "Motownphilly" – Boyz II Men
1994	**"Whoomp! (There It Is)"** – Tag Team	"Again" – Janet Jackson; "Hey Mr. D.J." – Zhané
1995	**"Creep"** – TLC	"I'll Make Love to You" – Boyz II Men; "On Bended Knee" – Boyz II Men
1996	**"Gangsta's Paradise"** – Coolio	"Baby" – Brandy; "One Sweet Day" – Mariah Carey and Boyz II Men; "Waterfalls" – TLC
1997	**"Killing Me Softly" – Fugees**	"C'mon N' Ride It (The Train)" - Quad City DJ's; "Always Be My Baby" – Mariah Carey; "I Love You Always Forever" - Donna Lewis
1998	**"MMMBop"** – Hanson	"Don't Speak" – No Doubt; "I'll Be Missing You" – Puff Daddy & Faith Evans feat. 112; "Men in Black" – Will Smith
1999	**"Everybody (Backstreet's Back)"** – Backstreet Boys	"Are You That Somebody?" – Aaliyah; "Gettin' Jiggy wit It" – Will Smith; "Miami" – Will Smith
2000	**"Wild Wild West"** – Will Smith	"(You Drive Me) Crazy" – Britney Spears; "All Star" – Smash Mouth; "Bug-a-Boo" – Destiny's Child
2001	**"Who Let the Dogs Out?"** – Baha Men	"Bounce with Me" – Lil' Bow Wow; "Bye Bye Bye" – *NSYNC; "Oops... I Did It Again" – Britney Spears
2002	**"Get the Party Started"** – P!nk	"Don't Let Me Be the Last to Know" – Britney Spears; "I'm a Believer" – Smash Mouth; "Pop" – *NSYNC
2003	**"Sk8er Boi"** – Avril Lavigne	"Dilemma" – Nelly feat. Kelly Rowland; "Girlfriend (The Neptunes Remix)" – *NSYNC feat. Nelly; "Jenny From the Block" – Jennifer Lopez
2004	**"Hey Ya!"** – Outkast	"Bump, Bump, Bump" – B2K; "Crazy in Love" (featuring Jay Z) – Beyoncé; "Where Is the Love?" (featuring Justin Timberlake) – The Black Eyed Peas
2005	**"Burn"** – Usher	"Lose My Breath" – Destiny's Child; "My Boo" – Usher ft. Alicia Keys; "Toxic" – Britney Spears
2006	**"Wake Me Up When September Ends"** – Green Day	"1, 2 Step" – Ciara; "Hollaback Girl" – Gwen Stefani; "We Belong Together" – Mariah Carey
2007	**"Irreplaceable"** – Beyoncé	"Bad Day" – Daniel Powter; "Crazy" – Gnarls Barkley; "Hips Don't Lie" – Shakira feat. Wyclef Jean
2008	**"Girlfriend"** – Avril Lavigne	"Beautiful Girls" – Sean Kingston; "Big Girls Don't Cry" – Fergie; "Don't Matter" – Akon
2009	**"Single Ladies (Put a Ring on It)"** – Beyoncé	"Don't Stop the Music" – Rihanna; "I Kissed a Girl" – Katy Perry; "Kiss Kiss" – Chris Brown feat. T-Pain
2010	**"You Belong With Me"** – Taylor Swift	"I Gotta Feeling" – The Black Eyed Peas; "Paparazzi" – Lady Gaga; "Party in the U.S.A." – Miley Cyrus
2011	**"Baby"** – Justin Bieber feat. Ludacris	"California Gurls" – Katy Perry feat. Snoop Dogg; "Hey, Soul Sister" – Train; "Mine" – Taylor Swift
2012	**"Party Rock Anthem"** by LMFAO	"Born This Way" by Lady Gaga; "Firework" by Katy Perry; "Sparks Fly" by Taylor Swift
2013	**"What Makes You Beautiful"** – One Direction	"Call Me Maybe" – Carly Rae Jepsen; "Gangnam Style" – PSY; "We Are Never Ever Getting Back Together" – Taylor Swift
2014	**"Story of My Life"** – One Direction	"I Knew You Were Trouble" – Taylor Swift; "Roar" – Katy Perry; "Wrecking Ball" – Miley Cyrus
2015	**"Bang Bang"** – Jessie J, Ariana Grande and Nicki Minaj	"All About That Bass" – Meghan Trainor; "Dark Horse" – Katy Perry feat. Juicy J; "Fancy" – Iggy Azalea feat. Charli XCX; "Problem" – Ariana Grande feat. Iggy Azalea; "Shake It Off" – Taylor Swift
2016	**"Hello"** – Adele	"Bad Blood" – Taylor Swift feat. Kendrick Lamar; "Can't Feel My Face" – The Weeknd; "Hotline Bling" – Drake; "Thinking Out Loud" – Ed Sheeran; "What Do You Mean?" – Justin Bieber
2017	**"Work from Home"** – Fifth Harmony ft. Ty Dolla $ign	"24K Magic" – Bruno Mars; "Can't Stop the Feeling!" – Justin Timberlake; "Heathens" – Twenty One Pilots; "Send My Love (To Your New Lover)" – Adele; "Side to Side" – Ariana Grande ft. Nicki Minaj
2018	**"Shape of You"** – Ed Sheeran	"Despacito (Remix)" – Luis Fonsi & Daddy Yankee feat. Justin Bieber; "HUMBLE." – Kendrick Lamar; "I'm the One" – DJ Khaled feat. Justin Bieber, Quavo, Chance the Rapper & Lil Wayne; "It Ain't Me" – Kygo & Selena Gomez; "Look What You Made Me Do" – Taylor Swift; "That's What I Like" – Bruno Mars; "Thunder" – Imagine Dragons
2019	**"Thank U, Next"** – Ariana Grande	"Delicate" – Taylor Swift; "In My Blood" – Shawn Mendes; "In My Feelings" – Drake; "Natural" – Imagine Dragons; "Youngblood" – 5 Seconds of Summer
2020	**"Bad Guy"** – Billie Eilish	"7 Rings" – Ariana Grande; "Memories" – Maroon 5; "Old Town Road" – Lil Nas X; "Sucker" – Jonas Brothers; "You Need to Calm Down" – Taylor Swift
2021	**"Dynamite"** – BTS	"Blinding Lights" – The Weeknd; "Cardigan" – Taylor Swift; "Toosie Slide" – Drake; "Wonder" – Shawn Mendes; "Yummy" – Justin Bieber
2022	**"Happier Than Ever"** – Billie Eilish	"All Too Well (Taylor's Version)" – Taylor Swift; "Bad Habits" – Ed Sheeran; "Easy on Me" – Adele; "Take My Breath" – The Weeknd; "Up" – Cardi B
2023	**"As It Was"** – Harry Styles	"About Damn Time" – Lizzo; "Anti-Hero" – Taylor Swift; "Bejeweled" – Taylor Swift; "Break My Soul" – Beyoncé; "First Class" – Jack Harlow; "I Ain't Worried" – OneRepublic; "Lift Me Up" – Rihanna
2024	**"What Was I Made For?"** – Billie Eilish	"Dance the Night" – Dua Lipa; "Fast Car" – Luke Combs; "Flowers" – Miley Cyrus; "Paint The Town Red" – Doja Cat; "Selfish" – Justin Timberlake; "Texas Hold 'Em" – Beyoncé; "Yes, And?" – Ariana Grande
2025	**"Taste"** – Sabrina Carpenter	"Abracadabra" – Lady Gaga; "Cry for Me" – The Weeknd; "I Can Do It with a Broken Heart" – Taylor Swift; "Squabble Up" – Kendrick Lamar; "Wildflower" – Billie Eilish
2026	**"Swim"** – BTS	"Daisies" – Justin Bieber; "Drop Dead" – Olivia Rodrigo; "Hate That I Made You Love Me" – Ariana Grande; "I Just Might" – Bruno Mars; "Manchild" – Sabrina Carpenter; "The Fate of Ophelia" – Taylor Swift; "The Time of My Life" – Benson Boone
