= Kids' Choice Award for Favorite TV Show =

Nickelodeon award

The Nickelodeon Kids' Choice Award for Favorite TV Show is an award given at the Nickelodeon Kids' Choice Awards. From 2015–2017, and since 2020, the category has been split into kids and family programs, and in 2019 into comedy and drama.

== Winners and nominees ==
Year	TV show	Network
1988	ALF	NBC
1988	The Cosby Show	NBC
1988	Growing Pains	ABC
1989	The Cosby Show	NBC
1989	ALF	NBC
1989	Growing Pains	ABC
1990	The Cosby Show	NBC
1990	Doogie Howser, M.D.	ABC
1990	Married... with Children	Fox
1991	The Simpsons	Fox
1991	In Living Color	Fox
1991	The Fresh Prince of Bel-Air	NBC
1992	Beverly Hills, 90210	Fox
1992	In Living Color	Fox
1992	The Fresh Prince of Bel-Air	NBC
1994	Home Improvement	ABC
1994	Martin	Fox
1994	The Fresh Prince of Bel-Air	NBC
1995	Home Improvement	ABC
1995	Martin	Fox
1995	The Fresh Prince of Bel-Air	NBC
1996	Home Improvement	ABC
1996	Family Matters	ABC
1996	The Fresh Prince of Bel-Air	NBC
1996	Sister, Sister	The WB
1997	Home Improvement	ABC
1997	All That	Nickelodeon
1997	America's Funniest Home Videos	ABC
1997	Goosebumps	Fox Kids
1998	Kenan & Kel	Nickelodeon
1998	Home Improvement	ABC
1998	Sabrina the Teenage Witch	ABC
1998	Sister, Sister	The WB
1999	All That	Nickelodeon
1999	7th Heaven	The WB
1999	Boy Meets World	ABC
1999	Buffy the Vampire Slayer	The WB
2000	All That	Nickelodeon
2000	7th Heaven	The WB
2000	Boy Meets World	ABC
2000	Sabrina the Teenage Witch	ABC
2001	Malcolm in the Middle	Fox
2001	7th Heaven	The WB
2001	Friends	NBC
2001	Sabrina the Teenage Witch	The WB
2002	Lizzie McGuire	Disney Channel
2002	7th Heaven	The WB
2002	Buffy the Vampire Slayer	UPN
2002	Friends	NBC
2003	Lizzie McGuire	Disney Channel
2003	7th Heaven	The WB
2003	All That	Nickelodeon
2003	Friends	NBC
2004	All That	Nickelodeon
2004	Fear Factor	NBC
2004	Friends	NBC
2004	Lizzie McGuire	Disney Channel
2005	American Idol	Fox
2005	Drake & Josh	Nickelodeon
2005	Fear Factor	NBC
2005	Lizzie McGuire	Disney Channel
2006	Drake & Josh	Nickelodeon
2006	American Idol	Fox
2006	Fear Factor	NBC
2006	That's So Raven	Disney Channel
2007	American Idol	Fox
2007	Drake & Josh	Nickelodeon
2007	Fear Factor	NBC
2007	The Suite Life of Zack & Cody	Disney Channel
2008	Drake & Josh	Nickelodeon
2008	Hannah Montana	Disney Channel
2008	iCarly	Nickelodeon
2008	The Suite Life of Zack & Cody	Disney Channel
2009	iCarly	Nickelodeon
2009	Hannah Montana	Disney Channel
2009	The Suite Life of Zack & Cody	Disney Channel
2009	Zoey 101	Nickelodeon
2010	iCarly	Nickelodeon
2010	Sonny with a Chance	Disney Channel
2010	The Suite Life on Deck	Disney Channel
2010	Wizards of Waverly Place	Disney Channel
2011	iCarly	Nickelodeon
2011	Big Time Rush	Nickelodeon
2011	The Suite Life on Deck	Disney Channel
2011	Wizards of Waverly Place	Disney Channel
2012	Victorious	Nickelodeon
2012	Good Luck Charlie	Disney Channel
2012	iCarly	Nickelodeon
2012	Wizards of Waverly Place	Disney Channel
2013	Victorious	Nickelodeon
2013	Good Luck Charlie	Disney Channel
2013	iCarly	Nickelodeon
2013	Wizards of Waverly Place	Disney Channel
2014	Sam & Cat	Nickelodeon
2014	The Big Bang Theory	CBS
2014	Good Luck Charlie	Disney Channel
2014	Jessie	Disney Channel
2015
2015	Kids	
2015	Austin & Ally	Disney Channel
2015	Dog with a Blog	Disney Channel
2015	Every Witch Way	Nickelodeon
2015	Henry Danger	Nickelodeon
2015	Jessie	Disney Channel
2015	Nicky, Ricky, Dicky & Dawn	Nickelodeon
2015	Family	
2015	Modern Family	ABC
2015	Agents of S.H.I.E.L.D.	ABC
2015	The Big Bang Theory	CBS
2015	The Flash	The CW
2015	Gotham	Fox
2015	Once Upon a Time	ABC
2016
2016	Kids	
2016	The Thundermans	Nickelodeon
2016	Austin & Ally	Disney Channel
2016	Girl Meets World	Disney Channel
2016	Henry Danger	Nickelodeon
2016	Jessie	Disney Channel
2016	Lab Rats: Bionic Island	Disney XD
2016	Family	
2016	The Muppets	ABC
2016	Agents of S.H.I.E.L.D.	ABC
2016	The Big Bang Theory	CBS
2016	The Flash	The CW
2016	Modern Family	ABC
2016	Once Upon a Time	ABC
2017
2017	Kids	
2017	Henry Danger	Nickelodeon
2017	Game Shakers	Nickelodeon
2017	Girl Meets World	Disney Channel
2017	Nicky, Ricky, Dicky & Dawn	Nickelodeon
2017	The Thundermans	Nickelodeon
2017	Family	
2017	Fuller House	Netflix
2017	Agents of S.H.I.E.L.D.	ABC
2017	The Big Bang Theory	CBS
2017	Black-ish	ABC
2017	The Flash	The CW
2017	Supergirl	The CW
2018	Stranger Things	Netflix
2018	The Big Bang Theory	CBS
2018	The Flash	The CW
2018	Fuller House	Netflix
2018	Henry Danger	Nickelodeon
2018	K.C. Undercover	Disney Channel
2018	Power Rangers Ninja Steel	Nickelodeon
2018	The Thundermans	Nickelodeon
2019
2019	Funny	
2019	Fuller House	Netflix
2019	The Big Bang Theory	CBS
2019	Bunk'd	Disney Channel
2019	Henry Danger	Nickelodeon
2019	Modern Family	ABC
2019	Raven's Home	Disney Channel
2019	Drama	
2019	Riverdale	The CW
2019	A Series of Unfortunate Events	Netflix
2019	Chilling Adventures of Sabrina	Netflix
2019	The Flash	The CW
2019	Stranger Things	Netflix
2019	The Walking Dead	AMC
2020
2020	Kids	
2020	Henry Danger	Nickelodeon
2020	A Series of Unfortunate Events	Netflix
2020	All That	Nickelodeon
2020	Bunk'd	Disney Channel
2020	Power Rangers Beast Morphers	Nickelodeon
2020	Raven's Home	Disney Channel
2020	Family	
2020	Stranger Things	Netflix
2020	Fuller House	Netflix
2020	Modern Family	ABC
2020	The Big Bang Theory	CBS
2020	The Flash	The CW
2020	Young Sheldon	CBS
2021
2021	Kids	
2021	Alexa & Katie	Netflix
2021	Are You Afraid of the Dark?	Nickelodeon
2021	Danger Force	Nickelodeon
2021	Henry Danger	Nickelodeon
2021	High School Musical: The Musical: The Series	Disney+
2021	Raven's Home	Disney Channel
2021	Family	
2021	Stranger Things	Netflix
2021	Black-ish	ABC
2021	Cobra Kai	Netflix
2021	Fuller House	Netflix
2021	The Mandalorian	Disney+
2021	Young Sheldon	CBS
2022
2022	Kids	
2022	High School Musical: The Musical: The Series	Disney+
2022	Are You Afraid of the Dark?	Nickelodeon
2022	Danger Force	Nickelodeon
2022	Raven's Home	Disney Channel
2022	That Girl Lay Lay	Nickelodeon
2022	The Baby-Sitters Club	Netflix
2022	Family	
2022	iCarly (2021)	Paramount+
2022	Cobra Kai	Netflix
2022	The Flash	The CW
2022	Loki	Disney+
2022	WandaVision	Disney+
2022	Young Sheldon	CBS
2023
2023	Kids	
2023	The Fairly OddParents: Fairly Odder	Paramount+
2023	Are You Afraid of the Dark?	Nickelodeon
2023	High School Musical: The Musical: The Series	Disney+
2023	Ms. Marvel	Disney+
2023	Raven's Home	Disney Channel
2023	That Girl Lay Lay	Nickelodeon
2023	The Mighty Ducks: Game Changers	Disney+
2023	The Really Loud House	Nickelodeon
2023	Family	
2023	Wednesday	Netflix
2023	Cobra Kai	Netflix
2023	iCarly (2021)	Paramount+
2023	Obi-Wan Kenobi	Disney+
2023	She-Hulk: Attorney at Law	Disney+
2023	Stranger Things	Netflix
2023	Young Rock	NBC
2023	Young Sheldon	CBS
2024
2024	Kids	
2024	Percy Jackson and the Olympians	Disney+
2024	Danger Force	Nickelodeon
2024	High School Musical: The Musical: The Series	Disney+
2024	The Muppets Mayhem	Disney+
2024	Power Rangers Cosmic Fury	Netflix
2024	Raven's Home	Disney Channel
2024	The Really Loud House	Nickelodeon
2024	Tyler Perry's Young Dylan	Nickelodeon
2024	Family	
2024	Young Sheldon	CBS
2024	Abbott Elementary	ABC
2024	Avatar: The Last Airbender	Netflix
2024	Goosebumps (2023)	Disney+ Hulu
2024	iCarly (2021)	Paramount+
2024	Loki	Disney+
2025
2025	Kids	
2025	The Thundermans: Undercover	Nickelodeon
2025	Ayla & The Mirrors	Disney+
2025	Bunk'd	Disney Channel
2025	The Really Loud House	Nickelodeon
2025	Tyler Perry's Young Dylan	Nickelodeon
2025	Wizards Beyond Waverly Place	Disney Channel
2025	Family	
2025	XO, Kitty	Netflix
2025	Abbott Elementary	ABC
2025	Cobra Kai	Netflix
2025	Goosebumps: The Vanishing	Disney+ Hulu
2025	Star Wars: Skeleton Crew	Disney+
2025	The Lord of the Rings: The Rings of Power	Amazon Prime Video
2026
2026	Kids	
2026	Avatar: The Last Airbender	Netflix
2026	Percy Jackson and the Olympians	Disney+
2026	Soy Luna: Let's Roll Again	Disney+
2026	The Thundermans: Undercover	Nickelodeon
2026	Vampirina: Teenage Vampire	Disney Channel
2026	Wizards Beyond Waverly Place	Disney Channel
2026	Family	
2026	Abbott Elementary	ABC
2026	Ghosts	CBS
2026	Ginny & Georgia	Netflix
2026	Malcolm in the Middle: Life's Still Unfair	Hulu; Disney+
2026	One Piece	Netflix
2026	Stranger Things	Netflix
2026	Wednesday	Netflix
2026	XO, Kitty	Netflix

== Programs with multiple awards ==
4 awards

- Home Improvement (consecutive)

3 awards

- iCarly (2007) (consecutive)
- All That (2 consecutive)
- Stranger Things (2 consecutive)

2 awards

- American Idol
- The Cosby Show (consecutive)
- Drake & Josh
- Lizzie McGuire (consecutive)
- Victorious (consecutive)
- Henry Danger

== Programs with multiple nominations ==
7 nominations

- The Flash

6 nominations

- The Big Bang Theory
- iCarly (2007)
- Raven's Home

5 nominations

- All That
- The Fresh Prince of Bel-Air
- Henry Danger
- Home Improvement
- Young Sheldon

4 nominations

- Drake & Josh
- Fear Factor
- Friends
- High School Musical: The Musical: The Series
- Lizzie McGuire
- Stranger Things
- Wizards of Waverly Place

3 nominations

- Agents of S.H.I.E.L.D.
- American Idol
- Bunk'd
- Cobra Kai
- Danger Force
- Fuller House
- Good Luck Charlie
- Growing Pains
- iCarly (2021)
- Jessie
- Power Rangers franchise
- The Really Loud House
- Sabrina the Teenage Witch
- The Cosby Show
- The Suite Life of Zack & Cody
- The Thundermans
- Wizards Beyond Waverly Place

2 nominations

- Abbott Elementary
- ALF
- Are You Afraid of the Dark?
- Austin & Ally
- Black-ish
- Boy Meets World
- Buffy the Vampire Slayer
- Girl Meets World
- Goosebumps (2023)
- Hannah Montana
- In Living Color
- Loki
- Once Upon a Time
- Martin
- Modern Family
- Sister, Sister
- The Suite Life on Deck
- Tyler Perry's Young Dylan
- Vampirina: Teenage Vampire
- Victorious
