= 2015 Kids' Choice Awards =

Children's television awards show program broadcast in 2015

- Date: March 28, 2015
- Location: The Forum; Inglewood, California
- Hosted by: Nick Jonas

Television/radio coverage
- Network: Nickelodeon
- Runtime: 90 minutes
- Viewership: 3.63 million
- Directed by: Nikki Parsons

The 28th Annual Nickelodeon Kids' Choice Awards was held on March 28, 2015, at the Forum in Inglewood, California, United States, and hosted by Nick Jonas. The show was produced by Nickelodeon Productions, with a simulcast in the United States also carried across sister networks TeenNick, Nicktoons and TV Land, along with the network's mobile apps and website. It was led into by a double episode of The Thundermans. There were 4 new categories this year. Voting took place in six continents on 19 localized websites, along with various simulcasts across the world, on either live or tape-delayed. Despite the simulcast, the show suffered a deep drop from the 2014 ceremony, attracting approximately 3,630,000 million total viewers for the original American airing, a drop of 27% from year to year. TV sitcom Austin & Ally swept the KCAs, taking home 3 blimps; the series is the second from Disney Channel to win favorite kids show in KCA history.

The premiere of a new animated series, Harvey Beaks, aired after the telecast.

== Presenters and performers and stunts ==
=== Host ===
- Nick Jonas

=== Musical performers ===
- Nick Jonas – "Chains", "Jealous"
- Iggy Azalea feat. Jennifer Hudson - "Trouble"
- 5 Seconds of Summer - "What I Like About You"

=== Presenters ===
- Jamie Foxx
- Zendaya
- Kevin James
- Meghan Trainor
- Nick Cannon
- Debby Ryan
- Quvenzhané Wallis
- Echosmith
- Kaley Cuoco-Sweeting
- Tia Mowry
- Joe Jonas
- Breanna Yde
- Benjamin Flores, Jr.
- Josh Peck
- Adam Sandler
- Josh Gad
- Grant Gustin
- Chloe Bennet
- Bethany Mota
- Shawn Mendes
- Skylar Diggins
- Mo'ne Davis
- Jennette McCurdy
- Jennifer Lopez
- Chris Pratt

== Winners and nominees ==
- The nominees were announced on February 20, 2015.
- Winners are listed first, in **bold**. Other nominees are in alphabetical order.

=== Movies ===
Favorite Movie	Favorite Movie Actor
**The Hunger Games: Mockingjay – Part 1**; The Amazing Spider-Man 2; Guardians of the Galaxy; Maleficent; Teenage Mutant Ninja Turtles; Transformers: Age of Extinction	**Ben Stiller** – Night at the Museum: Secret of the Tomb as Larry Daley; Will Arnett – Teenage Mutant Ninja Turtles as Vern Fenwick; Steve Carell – Alexander and the Terrible, Horrible, No Good, Very Bad Day as Benjamin "Ben" Cooper; Jamie Foxx – The Amazing Spider-Man 2 as Max Dillon / Electro; Hugh Jackman – X-Men: Days of Future Past as Logan / Wolverine; Mark Wahlberg – Transformers: Age of Extinction as Cade Yeager
Favorite Movie Actress	Favorite Animated Movie
**Emma Stone** – The Amazing Spider-Man 2 as Gwendolyn "Gwen" Stacy; Cameron Diaz – Annie as Miss Colleen Hannigan; Elle Fanning – Maleficent as Princess Aurora; Megan Fox – Teenage Mutant Ninja Turtles as April O'Neil; Jennifer Garner – Alexander and the Terrible, Horrible, No Good, Very Bad Day as Kelly Cooper; Angelina Jolie – Maleficent as Maleficent	**Big Hero 6**; How to Train Your Dragon 2; The Lego Movie; Penguins of Madagascar; Rio 2; The SpongeBob Movie: Sponge Out of Water
Favorite Female Action Star
**Jennifer Lawrence** – The Hunger Games: Mockingjay – Part 1 as Katniss Everdeen; Halle Berry – X-Men: Days of Future Past as Ororo Munroe / Storm; Scarlett Johansson – Captain America: The Winter Soldier as Natasha Romanoff / Black Widow; Evangeline Lilly – The Hobbit: The Battle of the Five Armies as Tauriel; Elliot Page (Note: Credited as Ellen Page; X-Men: Days of Future Past was released before Page came out as transgender.) – X-Men: Days of Future Past as Kitty Pryde / Shadowcat; Zoe Saldaña – Guardians of the Galaxy as Gamora
Favorite Male Action Star	Favorite Villain
**Liam Hemsworth** – The Hunger Games: Mockingjay – Part 1 as Gale Hawthorne; Chris Evans – Captain America: The Winter Soldier as Steve Rogers / Captain America; Andrew Garfield – The Amazing Spider-Man 2 as Peter Parker / Spider-Man; Hugh Jackman – X-Men: Days of Future Past as Logan / Wolverine; Chris Pratt – Guardians of the Galaxy as Peter Quill / Star-Lord; Channing Tatum – Jupiter Ascending as Caine Wise	**Angelina Jolie** – Maleficent as Maleficent; Cameron Diaz – Annie as Miss Colleen Hannigan; Jamie Foxx – The Amazing Spider-Man 2 as Max Dillon / Electro; Lee Pace – Guardians of the Galaxy as Ronan the Accuser; Meryl Streep – Into the Woods as The Witch; Donald Sutherland – The Hunger Games: Mockingjay – Part 1 as President Coriolanus Snow

=== Television ===
Favorite TV Show – Kids Show	Favorite TV Show – Family Show
**Austin & Ally**; Dog with a Blog; Every Witch Way; Henry Danger; Jessie; Nicky, Ricky, Dicky & Dawn	**Modern Family**; Agents of S.H.I.E.L.D.; The Big Bang Theory; The Flash; Gotham; Once Upon a Time
Favorite TV Actor	Favorite TV Actress
**Ross Lynch** – Austin & Ally as Austin Moon; Benjamin Flores Jr. – The Haunted Hathaways as Louie Preston; Jack Griffo – The Thundermans as Max Thunderman; Grant Gustin – The Flash as Barry Allen / Flash; Charlie McDermott – The Middle as Axl Redford Heck; Jim Parsons – The Big Bang Theory as Dr. Sheldon Cooper	**Laura Marano** – Austin & Ally as Ally Dawson; Chloe Bennet – Agents of S.H.I.E.L.D. as Daisy "Skye" Johnson / Quake; Kaley Cuoco-Sweeting – The Big Bang Theory as Penny; Kira Kosarin – The Thundermans as Phoebe Thunderman; Jennifer Morrison – Once Upon a Time as Emma Swan; Debby Ryan – Jessie as Jessie Prescott
Favorite Reality Show	Favorite Talent Competition Show
**Dance Moms**; American Ninja Warrior; Cupcake Wars; MasterChef Junior; Shark Tank; Wipeout	**The Voice**; America's Got Talent; America's Next Top Model; American Idol; Dancing with the Stars; So You Think You Can Dance
Favorite Cartoon
**SpongeBob SquarePants**; Adventure Time; The Fairly OddParents; Phineas and Ferb; Teen Titans Go!; Teenage Mutant Ninja Turtles

=== Music ===
Favorite Music Group	Favorite Male Singer
**One Direction**; Coldplay; Fall Out Boy; Imagine Dragons; Maroon 5; OneRepublic	**Nick Jonas**; Bruno Mars; Blake Shelton; Sam Smith; Justin Timberlake; Pharrell Williams
Favorite Female Singer	Favorite Song Of The Year
**Selena Gomez**; Beyoncé; Ariana Grande; Nicki Minaj; Katy Perry; Taylor Swift	**"Bang Bang"** – Jessie J, Ariana Grande and Nicki Minaj; "All About That Bass" – Meghan Trainor; "Dark Horse" – Katy Perry feat. Juicy J; "Fancy" – Iggy Azalea feat. Charli XCX; "Problem" – Ariana Grande feat. Iggy Azalea; "Shake It Off" – Taylor Swift
Favorite New Artist
**Fifth Harmony**; 5 Seconds of Summer; Iggy Azalea; Echosmith; Jessie J; Meghan Trainor

=== Miscellaneous ===
Favorite Book	Most Addicting Game
**Diary of a Wimpy Kid series**; The Divergent trilogy; The Fault in Our Stars; The Heroes of Olympus series; The Maze Runner; Percy Jackson's Greek Gods	**Minecraft**; Angry Birds Transformers; Candy Crush Saga; Disney Infinity 2.0; Mario Kart 8; Skylanders: Trap Team

== International awards ==
=== Africa ===
The nominations were announced on February 23, with the event airing on April 1.

==== Favorite Radio DJ (South Africa) ====
- Bonang Matheba
- Roger Goode
- Darren Simpson
- Poppy Ntshongwana

==== Favorite On-Air Personality (Nigeria) ====
- The Big Tyme
- Mannie
- Gbemi
- Tosyn Bucknor

=== Australia and New Zealand ===
The nominations were revealed on February 24, with the American ceremony airing live with the Australian awards announced during continuity.

==== Favorite Internet Sensation ====
- Jamie's World
- Charli's Crafty Kitchen
- Troye Sivan
- Sarah Ellen
- DieselD199

==== Favorite Sports Star ====
- Steve Smith
- Stephanie Gilmore
- Nick Kyrgios
- Dan Carter
- Sarah Walker

==== Favorite Music Act ====
- 5 Seconds of Summer
- Sheppard
- Lorde
- Jamie McDell
- Iggy Azalea

==== Favorite Animal ====
- Grumpy Cat
- Dr. Colosso
- Boo the Pomeranian
- Meredith Grey and Olivia Benson
- Munchkin the Teddy Bear

==== Favorite Fan Army ====
- KATY CATS
- 5SOSFAM
- Arianators
- Directioners
- Swifties

=== Brazil ===
==== Favorite Artist ====
- Anitta
- Luan Santana
- MC Gui
- Lucas Lucco

=== France ===
==== Favorite Musical Artist ====
- Kendji Girac
- Matt Pokora
- Tal
- Indila

=== Germany ===
==== Favorite Celebrity ====
- Revolverheld
- Mario Götze
- Mandy Capristo
- Joko und Klaas

==== Favorite Videoblogger ====
- DieLochis
- BibisBeautyPalace
- Dagi Bee
- Sami Slimani

=== Latin America ===
==== Favorite Artist ====
- Dulce María (Mexico)
- CD9 (Mexico)
- Lali Esposito (Argentina)
- Maluma (Colombia)

=== Italy ===
==== Favorite Singer ====
- Annalisa
- Dear Jack
- Fedez
- Lorenzo Fragola

=== Netherlands and Belgium ===
==== Favorite Star ====
- B-Brave (Winner, second time in a row)
- Hardwell
- Ian Thomas
- MainStreet

=== Poland ===
==== Favorite Star ====
- Dawid Kwiatkowski
- LemON
- Margaret
- Mrozu

=== Portugal ===
==== Favorite Musical Artist ====
- D.A.M.A
- HMB
- No Stress
- Tom Enzy

=== Russia ===
==== Favorite Sports Star ====
- Yulia Lipnitskaya

==== Favorite Actor ====
- Pavel Priluchny

==== Favorite Actress ====
- Anna Khilkevich

==== Favorite Breakthrough ====
- MBAND

==== Favorite Fan Army ====
- Directioners

=== Asia ===
The nominations were revealed on February 24, with the event airing on March 30.

==== Favorite Asian Act ====
- JKT48 (Indonesia)
- Jinnyboy (Malaysia)
- Daniel Padilla (Philippines)
- Tosh Zhang (Singapore)

==== Favorite Chinese Act ====
- Bibi Zhou (China)
- Qi Wei (China)
- Sean Zhang (China)
- MAYDAY (Taiwan)

=== United Kingdom ===
The nominations were announced on February 20, with local awards awarded during continuity with the American ceremony on tape delay 29 March on Nickelodeon. The ceremony was re-transmitted 5 April on Channel 5, which Viacom acquired in 2014, marking the first time the Kids' Choice Awards was transmitted free-to-air in the United Kingdom.

==== UK Favourite Music Act ====
- Ed Sheeran
- One Direction
- Little Mix
- Jessie J

==== UK Favourite Celebrity Animal ====
- Pudsey the Dog
- Prince Essex
- Pippin & Percy
- Hot Lips

==== UK Favourite Football Star ====
- Alexis Sánchez
- Diego Costa
- Wayne Rooney
- Raheem Sterling

==== UK Favourite Tipster ====
- Mr. Stampy Cat
- TheDiamondMinecart
- Spencer FC
- Sean Thorne

==== UK Favourite Breakthrough ====
- Ella Henderson
- Ella Eyre
- Rixton
- George Ezra

==== UK Favourite Fan Family ====
- Directioners
- Swifties
- Vampettes
- Arianators

==== UK Favourite Vlogger ====
- Zoella
- Niomi Smart
- Caspar Lee
- Alfie Deyes
