= 2025 Kids' Choice Awards =

Children's television awards show program broadcast in 2025

- Date: June 21, 2025
- Location: Barker Hangar; Santa Monica, California
- Hosted by: Tyla
- Most awards: Sabrina Carpenter, The Thundermans: Undercover, and Wicked (3)
- Most nominations: Wicked (8)

Television/radio coverage
- Network: Nickelodeon; TeenNick; Nicktoons; Nick Jr. Channel; CMT; MTV2
- Runtime: 88 minutes
- Viewership: 0.16 million
- Produced by: Chris McQueen
- Directed by: James Merryman

The 38th Annual Nickelodeon Kids' Choice Awards ceremony was held on June 21, 2025, at the Barker Hangar in Santa Monica, California with Tyla serving as host. It aired live on Nickelodeon and in a domestic simulcast with several other Paramount Global cable networks, and broadcast live or tape delayed across all of Nickelodeon's international networks. This was the first event to be held in the month of June since 1989.

The ceremony included performances from Katseye and mgk.

An encore presentation of Despicable Me 3 led into the ceremony, while a new episode of Wylde Pak served as the lead-out.

== Appearances ==
Prior to the ceremony, Owen Holt and Jane McManus hosted an Orange Carpet livestream on the Nickelodeon YouTube channel.

The ceremony featured appearances by celebrities including Jack Black, Alex Warren, Auliʻi Cravalho, Benny Blanco, Ice Spice, Jack Griffo, Jacob Rodriguez, Katelyn West, Kel Mitchell, Kira Kosarin, Maia Kealoha, Renee Montgomery, SeanDoesMagic, Samantha Lorraine, Tony Hawk, and Victoria Monét.

Presenters at the 2025 Kids' Choice Awards
| Presenter(s) | Role |
|---|---|
| Leon Thomas Alex Warren | Presented 'Favorite Female Artist' |
| Benny Blanco Victoria Monét | Presented 'Favorite Female Animated Voice from a Movie' |
| Tony Hawk Katelyn West | Presented 'Favorite Kids TV Show' |
| Tyla | Presented 'Favorite Album', 'Favorite Female Breakout Artist', and 'Favorite Song' |
| Young Dylan Daniella Monet | Presented 'Favorite Reality TV Show' |
| Casie Baker | Introduced mgk |
| Tyla | Presented 'ICON' |
| Brie Garcia Maia Kealoha | Presented 'Favorite Female Creator' |
| Ana de la Reguera Héctor Jiménez | Presented 'King of Comedy' |
| Tyla | Presented 'Favorite Movie Actor' |
| Kid Cowboy | Presented 'Favorite Cartoon' |
| Tyla Ice Spice | Introduced Katseye |
| Kylie Cantrall Malia Baker | Presented 'Favorite Viral Song' |

== Performers ==
Performers at the 2025 Kids' Choice Awards
| Performer(s) | Song(s) |
|---|---|
| N/A | Dance medley "Water" "Abracadabra" "Think U the S*** (Fart)" "Friend of Mine" "Bluest Flame" "Bliss" |
| mgk | "Cliché" |
| Katseye | "Gnarly" |

== Winners and nominees ==
The nominees were announced and voting opened on May 15, 2025. This ceremony features the return of the categories Favorite Song from a Movie, and Favorite Butt-Kicker, along with the debuts of categories Favorite Podcast and Favorite Kids' Creator. The Favorite Breakout Artist category is split into a male and female category. The winners are listed first, highlighted in boldfaced text.

=== Movies ===
| Favorite Movie | Favorite Movie Actor |
|---|---|
| **Wicked**; A Minecraft Movie; Beetlejuice Beetlejuice; Captain America: Brave New World; Descendants: The Rise of Red; Paddington in Peru; Sonic the Hedgehog 3; Thunderbolts* | **Jack Black** – A Minecraft Movie as Steve; Chris Evans – Red One as Jack O'Malley; Chris Pratt – The Electric State as Keats; Dwayne Johnson – Red One as Callum Drift; Jason Momoa – A Minecraft Movie as Garrett Garrison; Jim Carrey – Sonic the Hedgehog 3 as Dr. Robotnik |
| Favorite Movie Actress | Favorite Animated Movie |
| **Ariana Grande** – Wicked as Glinda; Cynthia Erivo – Wicked as Elphaba; Emma Myers – A Minecraft Movie as Natalie; Jenna Ortega – Beetlejuice Beetlejuice as Astrid Deetz; Millie Bobby Brown – The Electric State as Michelle Greene; Winona Ryder – Beetlejuice Beetlejuice as Lydia Deetz | **Inside Out 2**; Despicable Me 4; Dog Man; Moana 2; Mufasa: The Lion King; Plankton: The Movie; The Wild Robot; Transformers One |
| Favorite Male Animated Voice from a Movie | Favorite Female Animated Voice from a Movie |
| **Dwayne Johnson** – Moana 2 as Maui; Ben Schwartz – Sonic the Hedgehog 3 as Sonic the Hedgehog; Chris Hemsworth – Transformers One as Orion Pax; Keanu Reeves – Sonic the Hedgehog 3 as Shadow the Hedgehog; Steve Carell – Despicable Me 4 as Gru; Will Ferrell – Despicable Me 4 as Maxime Le Mal | **Auliʻi Cravalho** – Moana 2 as Moana; Amy Poehler – Inside Out 2 as Joy; Kristen Wiig – Despicable Me 4 as Lucy; Lupita Nyong'o – The Wild Robot as ROZ; Maya Hawke – Inside Out 2 as Anxiety; Scarlett Johansson – Transformers One as Elita-1 |
| Favorite Villain | Favorite Butt-Kicker |
| **Jim Carrey** – Sonic the Hedgehog 3 as Dr. Robotnik; Frankie Grande – Henry Danger: The Movie as Frankini; Harrison Ford – Captain America: Brave New World as President Thaddeus Ross / Red Hulk; Jeff Goldblum – Wicked as The Wonderful Wizard of Oz; Michael Keaton – Beetlejuice Beetlejuice as Beetlejuice; Michelle Yeoh – Wicked as Madame Morrible; Rita Ora – Descendants: The Rise of Red as Queen of Hearts | **Emma Myers** – A Minecraft Movie as Natalie; Anthony Mackie – Captain America: Brave New World as Sam Wilson / Captain America; Florence Pugh – Thunderbolts* as Yelena Belova; Kylie Cantrall – Descendants: The Rise of Red as Princess Red; Jace Norman – Henry Danger: The Movie as Henry Hart; Jack Black – A Minecraft Movie as Steve; Sebastian Stan – Thunderbolts* as Bucky Barnes |

=== Television ===
| Favorite Kids TV Show | Favorite Male TV Star (Kids) |
|---|---|
| **The Thundermans: Undercover**; Ayla & The Mirrors; Bunk'd; The Really Loud House; Tyler Perry's Young Dylan; Wizards Beyond Waverly Place | **Jack Griffo** – The Thundermans: Undercover as Max Thunderman; David Henrie – Wizards Beyond Waverly Place as Justin Russo; Dylan Gilmer – Tyler Perry's Young Dylan as Young Dylan; Hero Hunter – Tyler Perry's Young Dylan as Charlie Wilson; Israel Johnson – Bunk'd as Noah Lambert; Trevor Tordjman – Bunk'd as Parker Preston |
| Favorite Female TV Star (Kids) | Favorite Family TV Show |
| **Kira Kosarin** – The Thundermans: Undercover as Phoebe Thunderman; Celina Smith – Tyler Perry's Young Dylan as Rebecca Wilson; Janice LeAnn Brown – Wizards Beyond Waverly Place as Billie; Mallory James Mahoney – Bunk'd as Destiny Baker; Maya Le Clark – The Thundermans: Undercover as Chloe Thunderman; Miranda May – Bunk'd as Lou Hockhauser | **XO, Kitty**; Abbott Elementary; Cobra Kai; Goosebumps: The Vanishing; Star Wars: Skeleton Crew; The Lord of the Rings: The Rings of Power |
| Favorite Male TV Star (Family) | Favorite Female TV Star (Family) |
| **Xolo Maridueña** – Cobra Kai as Miguel Diaz; Damon Wayans Jr. – Poppa's House as Damon; David Schwimmer – Goosebumps: The Vanishing as Anthony Brewer; George Lopez – Lopez vs Lopez as George; Jude Law – Star Wars: Skeleton Crew as Jod Na Nawood; Sam McCarthy – Goosebumps: The Vanishing as Devin Brewer | **Peyton List** – Cobra Kai as Tory Nichols; Anna Cathcart – XO, Kitty as Kitty; Janelle James – Abbott Elementary as Ava Coleman; Jayden Bartels – Goosebumps: The Vanishing as Cece Brewer; Reba McEntire – Happy's Place as Bobbie; Ryan Kiera Armstrong – Star Wars: Skeleton Crew as Fern |
| Favorite Reality TV Show | Favorite Cartoon |
| **America's Got Talent**; America's Funniest Home Videos; American Idol; American Ninja Warrior; MasterChef Junior; The Masked Singer | **SpongeBob SquarePants**; Dragon Ball Daima; Monster High; The Loud House; The Simpsons; Teen Titans Go! |

=== Music ===
| Favorite Music Group | Favorite Male Artist |
|---|---|
| **Stray Kids**; Blink-182; Coldplay; Imagine Dragons; Jonas Brothers; Linkin Park; Twice | **Bruno Mars**; Bad Bunny; Drake; Jelly Roll; Kendrick Lamar; Post Malone; Travis Scott; The Weeknd |
| Favorite Female Artist | Favorite Song |
| **SZA**; Ariana Grande; Billie Eilish; Cardi B; Katy Perry; Lady Gaga; Selena Gomez; Taylor Swift | **"Taste"** – Sabrina Carpenter; "Abracadabra" – Lady Gaga; "Cry for Me" – The Weeknd; "I Can Do It with a Broken Heart" – Taylor Swift; "Squabble Up" – Kendrick Lamar; "Wildflower" – Billie Eilish |
| Favorite Male Breakout Artist | Favorite Female Breakout Artist |
| **Benson Boone**; Alex Warren; d4vd; Djo; Leon Thomas III; Myles Smith; Shaboozey; Zach Bryan | **Sabrina Carpenter**; Addison Rae; Chappell Roan; Doechii; GloRilla; Jennie; Lisa; Rosé |
| Favorite Album | Favorite Song from a Movie |
| **Short n' Sweet** – Sabrina Carpenter; Beautifully Broken – Jelly Roll; F-1 Trillion – Post Malone; GNX – Kendrick Lamar; Hurry Up Tomorrow – The Weeknd; I Said I Love You First – Selena Gomez and Benny Blanco; Mayhem – Lady Gaga; Wicked: The Soundtrack | **"Defying Gravity"** – Cynthia Erivo featuring Ariana Grande (from Wicked); "Can I Get a Chee Hoo?" – Dwayne Johnson (from Moana 2); "Higher Love" – Desi Trill featuring DJ Khaled, Cardi B, Natania, and Subhi (from Smurfs); "I Always Wanted a Brother" – Braelyn Rankins, Theo Somolu, Aaron Pierre, and Kelvin Harrison Jr. (from Mufasa: The Lion King); "I Feel Alive" – Jack Black (from A Minecraft Movie); "Kiss the Sky" – Maren Morris (from The Wild Robot); "Popular" – Ariana Grande (from Wicked); "Run It" – Jelly Roll (from Sonic the Hedgehog 3) |
| Favorite Music Collaboration | Favorite Viral Song |
| "**Luther**" – Kendrick Lamar and SZA; "APT." – Rosé and Bruno Mars; "Call Me When You Break Up" – Selena Gomez, Benny Blanco, and Gracie Abrams; "Die with a Smile" – Lady Gaga and Bruno Mars; "Please Please Please" – Sabrina Carpenter featuring Dolly Parton; "Show Me Love" – WizTheMc, Bees & Honey, and Tyla; "Slow Motion" – Marshmello and Jonas Brothers | **"Bluest Flame"** – Selena Gomez and Benny Blanco; "Apple" – Charli XCX; "Messy" – Lola Young; "Ordinary" – Alex Warren; "Pink Pony Club" – Chappell Roan; "Sports Car" – Tate McRae; "That's So True" – Gracie Abrams |
| Favorite Global Music Star | Favorite Podcast |
| **Africa: Tyla**; Asia: Stray Kids; Australia: The Kid Laroi; Europe: David Guetta; Latin America: Shakira; North America: Bruno Mars; United Kingdom: Ed Sheeran | **LOL Podcast**; American Girl: The Smart Girl's Podcast; Are You Afraid of the Dark?; Avatar: Braving the Elements; New Heights with Jason & Travis Kelce; Super Great Kids' Stories; Baby, This is Keke Palmer; The Nikki & Brie Show |

=== Sports ===
| Favorite Male Sports Star | Favorite Female Sports Star |
|---|---|
| **LeBron James**; Shohei Ohtani; Lionel Messi; Jalen Hurts; Jayson Tatum; Patrick Mahomes; Travis Kelce; Stephen Curry | **Simone Biles**; Sha'Carri Richardson; Alex Morgan; Jordan Chiles; Caitlin Clark; Naomi Osaka; Angel Reese; Coco Gauff |

=== Miscellaneous ===
| Favorite Male Creator | Favorite Female Creator |
|---|---|
| **MrBeast**; SeanDoesMagic; Mark Rober; Dhar Mann; Adam Rose; Keith Lee | **Salish Matter**; Sofie Dossi; Emma Chamberlain; Charli D'Amelio; Brooke Monk; Lexi Rivera |
| Favorite Kids' Creator | Favorite Gamer |
| **Ms. Rachel**; Toys and Colors; Danny Go!; Ryan Kaji/Ryan's World; Kids Diana Show; A for Adley | **IShowSpeed**; IBella; Aphmau; Unspeakable; Kai Cenat; Ninja; Pokimane |
Favorite Video Game
**Roblox**; Fortnite; Just Dance 2025 Edition; Madden NFL 25; Minecraft; Super Mario Party Jamboree

== Special Recognitions ==
=== King of Comedy ===
- Jack Black

=== ICON ===
- Rihanna
