= Kids' Choice Award for Favorite Movie =

American film award

The Kids' Choice Award for Favorite Movie is an award given at the Nickelodeon Kids' Choice Awards.

== Notes ==
- ≈ indicates an Academy Award for Best Picture nominee
- ± indicates an Academy Award for Best Picture winner

== Winners and nominees ==
Year	Recipient	Nominees
1987	The Karate Kid Part II	Crocodile Dundee; Top Gun
1988	Beverly Hills Cop II	Adventures in Babysitting; La Bamba
1989	Who Framed Roger Rabbit	Beetlejuice; Police Academy 5: Assignment Miami Beach
1990	Look Who's Talking	Back to the Future Part II; Batman
1991	Home Alone	House Party; Teenage Mutant Ninja Turtles
1992	The Addams Family	Boyz n the Hood; My Girl
1994	Jurassic Park	Cool Runnings; Free Willy
1995	The Lion King	Ace Ventura: Pet Detective; Speed
1996	Ace Ventura: When Nature Calls	Batman Forever; Casper; Toy Story
1997	Independence Day	Happy Gilmore; The Nutty Professor; Twister
1998	Titanic±	Batman & Robin; Liar Liar; Men in Black
1999	The Rugrats Movie	A Bug's Life; Dr. Dolittle; The Waterboy
2000	Big Daddy	Austin Powers: The Spy Who Shagged Me; Pokémon: The First Movie; Toy Story 2
2001	How the Grinch Stole Christmas	Big Momma's House; Charlie's Angels; Nutty Professor II: The Klumps
2002	Rush Hour 2	Dr. Dolittle 2; Harry Potter and the Sorcerer's Stone; Shrek
2003	Austin Powers in Goldmember	Harry Potter and the Chamber of Secrets; Ice Age; Spider-Man
2004	Finding Nemo	Bruce Almighty; Daddy Day Care; Elf
2005	The Incredibles	Harry Potter and the Prisoner of Azkaban; Shrek 2; Spider-Man 2
2006	Harry Potter and the Goblet of Fire	Are We There Yet?; Charlie and the Chocolate Factory; Herbie: Fully Loaded
2007	Pirates of the Caribbean: Dead Man's Chest	Big Momma's House 2; Click; Night at the Museum
2008	Alvin and the Chipmunks	Are We Done Yet?; Pirates of the Caribbean: At World's End; Transformers
2009	High School Musical 3: Senior Year	Bedtime Stories; The Dark Knight; Iron Man
2010	Alvin and the Chipmunks: The Squeakquel	Transformers: Revenge of the Fallen; The Twilight Saga: New Moon; X-Men Origins: Wolverine
2011	The Karate Kid	Alice in Wonderland; Diary of a Wimpy Kid; Harry Potter and the Deathly Hallows – Part 1
2012	Alvin and the Chipmunks: Chipwrecked	Harry Potter and the Deathly Hallows – Part 2; The Muppets; The Smurfs
2013	The Hunger Games	The Amazing Spider-Man; The Avengers; Diary of a Wimpy Kid: Dog Days
2014	The Hunger Games: Catching Fire	Iron Man 3; Oz the Great and Powerful; The Smurfs 2
2015	The Hunger Games: Mockingjay – Part 1	The Amazing Spider-Man 2; Guardians of the Galaxy; Maleficent; Teenage Mutant Ninja Turtles; Transformers: Age of Extinction
2016	Star Wars: The Force Awakens	Ant-Man; Avengers: Age of Ultron; Cinderella; Daddy's Home; The Hunger Games: Mockingjay – Part 2; Jurassic World; Pitch Perfect 2
2017	Ghostbusters	Batman v Superman: Dawn of Justice; Captain America: Civil War; Pete's Dragon; Rogue One: A Star Wars Story; Teenage Mutant Ninja Turtles: Out of the Shadows
2018	Jumanji: Welcome to the Jungle	Beauty and the Beast; The Greatest Showman; Guardians of the Galaxy Vol. 2; Pitch Perfect 3; Spider-Man: Homecoming; Star Wars: The Last Jedi; Wonder Woman
2019	Avengers: Infinity War	Aquaman; Black Panther≈; The Kissing Booth; Mary Poppins Returns; To All the Boys I've Loved Before
2020	Avengers: Endgame	Aladdin; Captain Marvel; Jumanji: The Next Level; Spider-Man: Far From Home; Star Wars: The Rise of Skywalker
2021	Wonder Woman 1984	Dolittle; Hamilton; Hubie Halloween; Mulan; Sonic the Hedgehog
2022	Spider-Man: No Way Home	Cinderella; Clifford the Big Red Dog; Jungle Cruise; Space Jam: A New Legacy; Tom & Jerry
2023	Sonic the Hedgehog 2	Avatar: The Way of Water≈; Black Adam; Black Panther: Wakanda Forever; Hocus Pocus 2; Jurassic World Dominion; Monster High: The Movie; Top Gun: Maverick≈
2024	Barbie≈	Aquaman and the Lost Kingdom; Ghostbusters: Frozen Empire; Guardians of the Galaxy Vol. 3; The Little Mermaid; The Marvels; Transformers: Rise of the Beasts; Wonka
2025	Wicked≈	A Minecraft Movie; Beetlejuice Beetlejuice; Captain America: Brave New World; Descendants: The Rise of Red; Paddington in Peru; Sonic the Hedgehog 3; Thunderbolts*
2026	Spider-Man: Brand New Day	Avatar: Fire and Ash; How to Train Your Dragon; Jurassic World Rebirth; Lilo & Stitch; Moana; Superman; Wicked: For Good
