= Kids' Choice Award for Favorite Music Group =

Music award

This is a list of winners and nominees for the Kids' Choice Award for Favorite Music Group, given at the Nickelodeon Kids' Choice Awards.

== Winners and nominations ==
Year	Recipient	Nominees
1994	Aerosmith	Shai; SWV
1995	Boyz II Men	All-4-One; TLC
1996	TLC	All-4-One; Boyz II Men; Green Day
1997	Fugees	Hootie & the Blowfish; Boyz II Men; TLC
1998	Hanson	Backstreet Boys; No Doubt; Spice Girls
1999	*NSYNC	Backstreet Boys; Spice Girls; Dru Hill
2000	Backstreet Boys	*NSYNC; 98 Degrees; TLC
2001	Destiny's Child	Backstreet Boys; Baha Men; *NSYNC
2002	Destiny's Child	Backstreet Boys; Dream; *NSYNC
2003	B2K	Baha Men; Destiny's Child; *NSYNC
2004	OutKast	B2K; Good Charlotte; No Doubt
2005	Green Day	The Black Eyed Peas; Destiny's Child; OutKast
2006	Green Day	Backstreet Boys; The Black Eyed Peas; Destiny's Child
2007	The Black Eyed Peas	Fall Out Boy; Nickelback; Red Hot Chili Peppers
2008	Jonas Brothers	Boys Like Girls; Fall Out Boy; Linkin Park
2009	Jonas Brothers	Daughtry; Linkin Park; Pussycat Dolls
2010	The Black Eyed Peas	Coldplay; Jonas Brothers; Linkin Park
2011	The Black Eyed Peas	Big Time Rush; Jonas Brothers; Lady Antebellum
2012	Big Time Rush	The Black Eyed Peas; Lady Antebellum; LMFAO
2013	One Direction	Big Time Rush; Bon Jovi; Maroon 5
2014	One Direction	Maroon 5; Macklemore & Ryan Lewis; OneRepublic
2015	One Direction	Coldplay; Fall Out Boy; Imagine Dragons; Maroon 5; OneRepublic
2016	Fifth Harmony	Fall Out Boy; Imagine Dragons; Maroon 5; One Direction; Pentatonix
2017	Fifth Harmony	The Chainsmokers; Maroon 5; OneRepublic; Pentatonix; Twenty One Pilots
2018	Fifth Harmony	The Chainsmokers; Imagine Dragons; Coldplay; Maroon 5; Twenty One Pilots
2019	Maroon 5	The Chainsmokers; Fall Out Boy; Imagine Dragons; Migos; Twenty One Pilots
2020	BTS	Fall Out Boy; Jonas Brothers; Maroon 5; Panic! at the Disco; The Chainsmokers
2021	BTS	Black Eyed Peas; Blackpink; Jonas Brothers; Maroon 5; OneRepublic
2022	BTS	Black Eyed Peas; Florida Georgia Line; Jonas Brothers; Maroon 5; Migos
2023	BTS	5 Seconds of Summer; Black Eyed Peas; Blackpink; Imagine Dragons; OneRepublic; Panic! at the Disco; Paramore
2024	Imagine Dragons	Black Eyed Peas; Coldplay; Jonas Brothers; Maroon 5; *NSYNC
2025	Stray Kids	Blink-182; Coldplay; Imagine Dragons; Jonas Brothers; Linkin Park; Twice
2026	BTS	Blackpink; Jonas Brothers; Maroon 5; Twenty One Pilots; Weezer

== Groups with the most wins ==
5 wins

- BTS (4 consecutive)

3 wins

- The Black Eyed Peas (2 consecutive)
- One Direction (consecutive)
- Fifth Harmony (consecutive)

2 wins

- Destiny’s Child (consecutive)
- Green Day (consecutive)
- Jonas Brothers (consecutive)

== Groups with most nominations ==
12 nominations

- Maroon 5

10 nominations

- The Black Eyed Peas
- Jonas Brothers

7 nominations

- Imagine Dragons

6 nominations

- Backstreet Boys
- Fall Out Boy

5 nominations

- BTS
- Coldplay
- Destiny's Child
- *NSYNC
- OneRepublic

4 nominations

- One Direction
- The Chainsmokers
- Twenty One Pilots

3 nominations

- Blackpink
- Big Time Rush
- Fifth Harmony
- Green Day
- Linkin Park

2 nominations

- Baha Men
- B2K
- Lady Antebellum
- Migos
- No Doubt
- Panic! at the Disco
- Pentatonix
- Spice Girls
- TLC
