= Kids' Choice Award for Favorite Female TV Star =

American award

The Nickelodeon Kids' Choice Awards, run annually on United States television since 1988, includes a category for "Favorite Female TV Star".

== Winners and nominees ==
The winners are listed in bold.

Year	Actor	Role(s)	Television Program	Ref.
**1988**; 2nd
**1988**; 2nd	**Alyssa Milano**	**Samantha Micelli**	**Who's the Boss?**	
**1988**; 2nd	Tempestt Bledsoe	Vanessa Huxtable	The Cosby Show	
**1988**; 2nd	Anne Schedeen	Kate Tanner	ALF	
**1989**; 3rd
**1989**; 3rd	**Alyssa Milano**	**Samantha Micelli**	**Who's the Boss?**	
**1989**; 3rd	Tracey Gold	Carol Sever	Growing Pains	
**1989**; 3rd	Holly Robinson	Officer Judy Hoffs	21 Jump Street	
**1990**; 4th
**1990**; 4th	**Alyssa Milano**	**Samantha Micelli**	**Who's the Boss?**	
**1990**; 4th	Jasmine Guy	Whitley Marion Gilbert	A Different World	
**1990**; 4th	Roseanne Barr	Roseanne Conner	Roseanne	
**1991**; 5th
**1991**; 5th	**Keshia Knight Pulliam**	**Rudy Huxtable**	**The Cosby Show**	
**1991**; 5th	Kirstie Alley	Rebecca Howe	Cheers	
**1991**; 5th	Roseanne Barr	Roseanne Conner	Roseanne	
**1992**; 6th
**1992**; 6th	**Roseanne Arnold**	**Roseanne Conner**	**Roseanne**	
**1992**; 6th	Christina Applegate	Kelly Bundy	Married... with Children	
**1992**; 6th	Jennie Garth	Kelly Taylor	Beverly Hills, 90210	
**1994**; 7th
**1994**; 7th	**Candace Cameron**	**D.J. Tanner**	**Full House**	
**1994**; 7th	Roseanne Arnold	Roseanne Conner	Roseanne	
**1994**; 7th	Tisha Campbell	Gina Waters-Payne	Martin	
**1995**; 8th
**1995**; 8th	**Tia** & **Tamera Mowry**	**Tia Landry & Tamera Campbell**	**Sister, Sister**	
**1995**; 8th	Queen Latifah	Khadijah James	Living Single	
**1995**; 8th	Roseanne Barr	Roseanne Conner	Roseanne	
**1996**; 9th
**1996**; 9th	**Tia** & **Tamera Mowry**	**Tia Landry & Tamera Campbell**	**Sister, Sister**	
**1996**; 9th	Tatyana Ali	Ashley Banks	The Fresh Prince of Bel-Air	
**1996**; 9th	Roseanne Barr	Roseanne Conner	Roseanne	
**1996**; 9th	Queen Latifah	Khadijah James	Living Single	
**1997**; 10th
**1997**; 10th	**Tia** & **Tamera Mowry**	**Tia Landry & Tamera Campbell**	**Sister, Sister**	
**1997**; 10th	Jennifer Aniston	Rachel Green	Friends	
**1997**; 10th	Roseanne Barr	Roseanne Conner	Roseanne	
**1997**; 10th	Courteney Cox	Monica Geller	Friends	
**1998**; 11th
**1998**; 11th	**Melissa Joan Hart**	**Sabrina Spellman**	**Sabrina the Teenage Witch**	
**1998**; 11th	Kirstie Alley	Veronica Chase	Veronica's Closet	
**1998**; 11th	Brandy	Moesha Mitchell	Moesha	
**1998**; 11th	Tia & Tamera Mowry	Tia Landry & Tamera Campbell	Sister, Sister	
**1999**; 12th
**1999**; 12th	**Mary-Kate** & **Ashley Olsen**	**Mary-Kate** & **Ashley Burke**	**Two of a Kind**	
**1999**; 12th	Jennifer Aniston	Rachel Green	Friends	
**1999**; 12th	Sarah Michelle Gellar	Buffy Summers	Buffy the Vampire Slayer	
**1999**; 12th	Melissa Joan Hart	Sabrina Spellman	Sabrina the Teenage Witch	
**2000**; 13th
**2000**; 13th	**Amanda Bynes**	**Various Characters**	**All That** and **The Amanda Show**	
**2000**; 13th	Brandy	Moesha Mitchell	Moesha	
**2000**; 13th	Melissa Joan Hart	Sabrina Spellman	Sabrina the Teenage Witch	
**2000**; 13th	Jennifer Love Hewitt	Sarah Reeves Merrin	Party of Five	
**2001**; 14th
**2001**; 14th	**Amanda Bynes**	**Various Characters**	**The Amanda Show**	
**2001**; 14th	Brandy	Moesha	Moesha Mitchell	
**2001**; 14th	Sarah Michelle Gellar	Buffy Summers	Buffy the Vampire Slayer	
**2001**; 14th	Melissa Joan Hart	Sabrina Spellman	Sabrina the Teenage Witch	
**2002**; 15th
**2002**; 15th	**Amanda Bynes**	**Various Characters**	**The Amanda Show**	
**2002**; 15th	Jennifer Aniston	Rachel Green	Friends	
**2002**; 15th	Hilary Duff	Lizzie McGuire	Lizzie McGuire	
**2002**; 15th	Melissa Joan Hart	Sabrina Spellman	Sabrina the Teenage Witch	
**2003**; 16th
**2003**; 16th	**Amanda Bynes**	**Various Characters**	**The Amanda Show**	
**2003**; 16th	Jennifer Aniston	Rachel Green	Friends	
**2003**; 16th	Hilary Duff	Lizzie McGuire	Lizzie McGuire	
**2003**; 16th	Melissa Joan Hart	Sabrina Spellman	Sabrina the Teenage Witch	
**2004**; 17th
**2004**; 17th	**Raven-Symoné**	**Raven Baxter**	**That's So Raven**	
**2004**; 17th	Jennifer Aniston	Rachel Green	Friends	
**2004**; 17th	Hilary Duff	Lizzie McGuire	Lizzie McGuire	
**2004**; 17th	Jamie Lynn Spears	Various Characters	All That	
**2005**; 18th
**2005**; 18th	**Raven-Symoné**	**Raven Baxter**	**That's So Raven**	
**2005**; 18th	Hilary Duff	Lizzie McGuire	Lizzie McGuire	
**2005**; 18th	Eve	Shelly Williams	Eve	
**2005**; 18th	Alyssa Milano	Phoebe Halliwell	Charmed	
**2006**; 19th
**2006**; 19th	**Jamie Lynn Spears**	**Zoey Brooks**	**Zoey 101**	
**2006**; 19th	Eve	Shelly Williams	Eve	
**2006**; 19th	Jennifer Love Hewitt	Melinda Gordon	Ghost Whisperer	
**2006**; 19th	Raven-Symoné	Raven Baxter	That's So Raven	
**2007** |20th
**2007** |20th	**Miley Cyrus**	**Miley Stewart/Hannah Montana**	**Hannah Montana**	
**2007** |20th	Emma Roberts	Addie Singer	Unfabulous	
**2007** |20th	Jamie Lynn Spears	Zoey Brooks	Zoey 101	
**2007** |20th	Raven-Symoné	Raven Baxter	That's So Raven	
**2008**; 21st
**2008**; 21st	**Miley Cyrus**	**Miley Stewart/Hannah Montana**	**Hannah Montana**	
**2008**; 21st	Emma Roberts	Addie Singer	Unfabulous	
**2008**; 21st	Jamie Lynn Spears	Zoey Brooks	Zoey 101	
**2008**; 21st	Raven-Symoné	Raven Baxter	That's So Raven	
**2009**; 22nd
**2009**; 22nd	**Selena Gomez**	**Alex Russo**	**Wizards of Waverly Place**	
**2009**; 22nd	Miranda Cosgrove	Carly Shay	iCarly	
**2009**; 22nd	Miley Cyrus	Miley Stewart/Hannah Montana	Hannah Montana	
**2009**; 22nd	America Ferrera	Betty Suarez	Ugly Betty	
**2010**; 23rd
**2010**; 23rd	**Selena Gomez**	**Alex Russo**	**Wizards of Waverly Place**	
**2010**; 23rd	Miranda Cosgrove	Carly Shay	iCarly	
**2010**; 23rd	Miley Cyrus	Miley Stewart/Hannah Montana	Hannah Montana	
**2010**; 23rd	Keke Palmer	True Jackson	True Jackson, VP	
**2011**; 24th
**2011**; 24th	**Selena Gomez**	**Alex Russo**	**Wizards of Waverly Place**	
**2011**; 24th	Miranda Cosgrove	Carly Shay	iCarly	
**2011**; 24th	Miley Cyrus	Miley Stewart/Hannah Montana	Hannah Montana	
**2011**; 24th	Victoria Justice	Tori Vega	Victorious	
**2012**; 25th
**2012**; 25th	**Selena Gomez**	**Alex Russo**	**Wizards of Waverly Place**	
**2012**; 25th	Miranda Cosgrove	Carly Shay	iCarly	
**2012**; 25th	Victoria Justice	Tori Vega	Victorious	
**2012**; 25th	Bridgit Mendler	Teddy Duncan	Good Luck Charlie	
**2013**; 26th
**2013**; 26th	**Selena Gomez**	**Alex Russo**	**Wizards of Waverly Place**	
**2013**; 26th	Miranda Cosgrove	Carly Shay	iCarly	
**2013**; 26th	Victoria Justice	Tori Vega	Victorious	
**2013**; 26th	Bridgit Mendler	Teddy Duncan	Good Luck Charlie	
**2014**; 27th
**2014**; 27th	**Ariana Grande**	**Cat Valentine**	**Sam & Cat**	
**2014**; 27th	Jennette McCurdy	Sam Puckett	Sam & Cat	
**2014**; 27th	Bridgit Mendler	Teddy Duncan	Good Luck Charlie	
**2014**; 27th	Debby Ryan	Jessie Prescott	Jessie	
**2015**; 28th
**2015**; 28th	**Laura Marano**	**Ally Dawson**	**Austin & Ally**	
**2015**; 28th	Chloe Bennet	Daisy "Skye" Johnson / Quake	Agents of S.H.I.E.L.D.	
**2015**; 28th	Kaley Cuoco-Sweeting	Penny	The Big Bang Theory	
**2015**; 28th	Kira Kosarin	Phoebe Thunderman	The Thundermans	
**2015**; 28th	Jennifer Morrison	Emma Swan	Once Upon a Time	
**2015**; 28th	Debby Ryan	Jessie Prescott	Jessie	
**2016**; 29th	Favorite Female TV Star – Kids Show			
**2016**; 29th	**Zendaya**	**K.C. Cooper**	**K.C. Undercover**	
**2016**; 29th	Dove Cameron	Liv and Maddie Rooney	Liv and Maddie	
**2016**; 29th	Lizzy Greene	Dawn Harper	Nicky, Ricky, Dicky & Dawn	
**2016**; 29th	Kira Kosarin	Phoebe Thunderman	The Thundermans	
**2016**; 29th	Laura Marano	Ally Dawson	Austin & Ally	
**2016**; 29th	Debby Ryan	Jessie Prescott	Jessie	
**2016**; 29th	Favorite Female TV Star – Family Show			
**2016**; 29th	**Sofía Vergara**	**Gloria Pritchett**	**Modern Family**	
**2016**; 29th	Chloe Bennet	Daisy "Skye" Johnson / Quake	Agents of S.H.I.E.L.D.	
**2016**; 29th	Kaley Cuoco	Penny	The Big Bang Theory	
**2016**; 29th	Sarah Hyland	Haley Dunphy	Modern Family	
**2016**; 29th	Jennifer Morrison	Emma Swan	Once Upon a Time	
**2016**; 29th	Ming-Na Wen	Melinda May	Agents of S.H.I.E.L.D.	
**2017**; 30th
**2017**; 30th	**Zendaya**	**K.C. Cooper**	**K.C. Undercover**	
**2017**; 30th	Rowan Blanchard	Riley Matthews	Girl Meets World	
**2017**; 30th	Dove Cameron	Liv and Maddie Rooney	Liv and Maddie	
**2017**; 30th	Lizzy Greene	Dawn Harper	Nicky, Ricky, Dicky & Dawn	
**2017**; 30th	Kira Kosarin	Phoebe Thunderman	The Thundermans	
**2017**; 30th	Breanna Yde	Tomika	School of Rock	
**2018**; 31st
**2018**; 31st	**Millie Bobby Brown**	**Eleven**	**Stranger Things**	
**2018**; 31st	Candace Cameron Bure	D.J. Fuller	Fuller House	
**2018**; 31st	Kaley Cuoco	Penny	The Big Bang Theory	
**2018**; 31st	Lizzy Greene	Dawn Harper	Nicky, Ricky, Dicky & Dawn	
**2018**; 31st	Kira Kosarin	Phoebe Thunderman	The Thundermans	
**2018**; 31st	Zendaya	K.C. Cooper	K.C. Undercover	
**2019**; 32nd
**2019**; 32nd	**Zendaya**	**K.C. Cooper**	**K.C. Undercover**	
**2019**; 32nd	Millie Bobby Brown	Eleven	Stranger Things	
**2019**; 32nd	Candace Cameron Bure	D.J. Fuller	Fuller House	
**2019**; 32nd	Kaley Cuoco	Penny	The Big Bang Theory	
**2019**; 32nd	Peyton Elizabeth Lee	Andi Mack	Andi Mack	
**2019**; 32nd	Raven-Symoné	Raven Baxter	Raven's Home	
**2020**; 33rd
**2020**; 33rd	**Millie Bobby Brown**	**Eleven**	**Stranger Things**	
**2020**; 33rd	Candace Cameron Bure	D.J. Tanner-Fuller	Fuller House	
**2020**; 33rd	Ella Anderson	Piper Hart	Henry Danger	
**2020**; 33rd	Peyton List	Emma Ross	Bunk'd	
**2020**; 33rd	Raven-Symoné	Raven Baxter	Raven's Home	
**2020**; 33rd	Riele Downs	Charlotte Page	Henry Danger	
**2021**; 34th
**2021**; 34th	**Millie Bobby Brown**	**Eleven**	**Stranger Things**	
**2021**; 34th	Ella Anderson	Piper Hart	Henry Danger	
**2021**; 34th	Candace Cameron Bure	D.J. Tanner-Fuller	Fuller House	
**2021**; 34th	Camila Mendes	Veronica Lodge	Riverdale	
**2021**; 34th	Raven-Symoné	Raven Baxter	Raven's Home	
**2021**; 34th	Sofia Wylie	Gina Porter	High School Musical: The Musical: The Series	
**2022**; 35th	Favorite Female TV Star – Kids Show			
**2022**; 35th	**Olivia Rodrigo**	**Nini Salazar-Roberts**	**High School Musical: The Musical: The Series**	
**2022**; 35th	Malia Baker	Mary Anne Spier & Gabby Lewis	The Baby-Sitters Club & Are You Afraid of the Dark?	
**2022**; 35th	Havan Flores	Chapa / Volt	Danger Force	
**2022**; 35th	Raven-Symoné	Raven Baxter	Raven's Home	
**2022**; 35th	That Girl Lay Lay	Lay Lay	That Girl Lay Lay	
**2022**; 35th	Sofia Wylie	Gina Porter	High School Musical: The Musical: The Series	
**2022**; 35th	Favorite Female TV Star – Family Show			
**2022**; 35th	**Miranda Cosgrove**	**Carly Shay**	**iCarly**	
**2022**; 35th	Peyton List	Tori Nicholas	Cobra Kai	
**2022**; 35th	Mary Mouser	Samantha LaRusso	Cobra Kai	
**2022**; 35th	Elizabeth Olsen	Wanda Maximoff / Scarlett Witch	WandaVision	
**2022**; 35th	Yara Shahidi	Zoey Johnson	Black-ish/Grown-ish	
**2022**; 35th	Hailee Steinfeld	Kate Bishop	Hawkeye	
**2023**; 36th	Favorite Female TV Star – Kids Show			
**2023**; 36th	**Olivia Rodrigo**	**Nini Salazar-Roberts**	**High School Musical: The Musical: The Series**	
**2023**; 36th	Imogen Cohen	Zina	The Fairly OddParents: Fairly Odder	
**2023**; 36th	Audrey Grace Marshall	Vivian Turner	The Fairly OddParents: Fairly Odder	
**2023**; 36th	Raven-Symoné	Raven Baxter	Raven's Home	
**2023**; 36th	That Girl Lay Lay	Lay Lay	That Girl Lay Lay	
**2023**; 36th	Sofia Wylie	Gina Porter	High School Musical: The Musical: The Series	
**2023**; 36th	Favorite Female TV Star – Family Show			
**2023**; 36th	**Jenna Ortega**	**Wednesday Addams**	**Wednesday**	
**2023**; 36th	Millie Bobby Brown	Eleven	Stranger Things	
**2023**; 36th	Miranda Cosgrove	Carly Shay	iCarly	
**2023**; 36th	Hilary Duff	Sophie	How I Met Your Father	
**2023**; 36th	Tracee Ellis Ross	Bow Johnson	Black-ish	
**2023**; 36th	Sadie Sink	Max Mayfield	Stranger Things	
**2024**; 37th	Favorite Female TV Star – Kids Show			
**2024**; 37th	**Olivia Rodrigo**	**Nini Salazar-Roberts**	**High School Musical: The Musical: The Series**	
**2024**; 37th	Hunter Deno	Amelia Jones	Power Rangers Cosmic Fury	
**2024**; 37th	Lilly Singh	Nora Singh	The Muppets Mayhem	
**2024**; 37th	Raven-Symoné	Raven Baxter	Raven's Home	
**2024**; 37th	Sofia Wylie	Gina Porter	High School Musical: The Musical: The Series	
**2024**; 37th	Tessa Rao	Izzy Garcia	Power Rangers Cosmic Fury	
**2024**; 37th	Favorite Female TV Star – Family Show			
**2024**; 37th	**Miranda Cosgrove**	**Carly Shay**	**iCarly**	
**2024**; 37th	Janelle James	Ava Coleman	Abbott Elementary	
**2024**; 37th	Laci Mosley	Harper Bettencourt	iCarly	
**2024**; 37th	Peyton List	Maddie Nears	School Spirits	
**2024**; 37th	Quinta Brunson	Janine Teagues	Abbott Elementary	
**2024**; 37th	Rosario Dawson	Ahsoka Tano	Ahsoka	
**2025**; 38th	Favorite Female TV Star – Kids Show			
**2025**; 38th	**Kira Kosarin**	**Phoebe Thunderman**	**The Thundermans: Undercover**	
**2025**; 38th	Celina Smith	Rebecca Wilson	Tyler Perry's Young Dylan	
**2025**; 38th	Janice LeAnn Brown	Billie	Wizards Beyond Waverly Place	
**2025**; 38th	Mallory James Mahoney	Destiny Baker	Bunk'd	
**2025**; 38th	Maya Le Clark	Chloe Thunderman	The Thundermans: Undercover	
**2025**; 38th	Miranda May	Lou Hockhauser	Bunk'd	
**2025**; 38th	Favorite Female TV Star – Family Show			
**2025**; 38th	**Peyton List**	**Tory Nichols**	**Cobra Kai**	
**2025**; 38th	Anna Cathcart	Kitty	XO, Kitty	
**2025**; 38th	Janelle James	Ava Coleman	Abbott Elementary	
**2025**; 38th	Jayden Bartels	Cece Brewer	Goosebumps: The Vanishing	
**2025**; 38th	Reba McEntire	Bobbie	Happy's Place	
**2025**; 38th	Ryan Kiera Armstrong	Fern	Star Wars: Skeleton Crew	
**2026**; 39th	Favorite Female TV Star - Kids Show			
**2026**; 39th	**Kira Kosarin**	**Phoebe Thunderman**	**The Thundermans: Undercover**	
**2026**; 39th	Elizabeth Yu	Azula	Avatar: The Last Airbender	
**2026**; 39th	Janice LeAnn Brown	Billie	Wizards Beyond Waverly Place	
**2026**; 39th	Kenzi Richardson	Vampirina "Vee" Hauntley	Vampirina: Teenage Vampire	
**2026**; 39th	Leah Sava Jeffries	Annabeth Chase	Percy Jackson and the Olympians	
**2026**; 39th	Maya Le Clark	Chloe Thunderman	The Thundermans: Undercover	
**2026**; 39th	Favorite Female TV Star - Family Show			
**2026**; 39th	**Jenna Ortega**	**Wednesday Addams**	**Wednesday**	
**2026**; 39th	Anna Cathcart	Kitty	XO, Kitty	
**2026**; 39th	Antonia Gentry	Ginny Miller	Ginny & Georgia	
**2026**; 39th	Catherine Zeta-Jones	Morticia Addams	Wednesday	
**2026**; 39th	Emma Myers	Enid Sinclair	Wednesday	
**2026**; 39th	Millie Bobby Brown	Eleven	Stranger Things	
**2026**; 39th	Quinta Brunson	Janine Teagues	Abbott Elementary	
**2026**; 39th	Sadie Sink	Max	Stranger Things	

== Most wins ==
5 wins

- Selena Gomez (5 consecutive)

4 wins

- Amanda Bynes (4 consecutive)

3 wins

- Millie Bobby Brown (2 consecutive)
- Alyssa Milano (3 consecutive)
- Olivia Rodrigo (3 consecutive)
- Tia & Tamera Mowry (3 consecutive)
- Zendaya

2 wins

- Roseanne Barr (2 consecutive)
- Miranda Cosgrove
- Miley Cyrus (2 consecutive)
- Kira Kosarin (2 consecutive)
- Jenna Ortega
- Raven-Symoné (2 consecutive)

== Most nominations ==
11 nominations

- Raven-Symoné

8 nominations

- Miranda Cosgrove

6 nominations

- Millie Bobby Brown
- Melissa Joan Hart
- Kira Kosarin

5 nominations

- Jennifer Aniston
- Roseanne Barr
- Miley Cyrus
- Hilary Duff (2 different roles)
- Selena Gomez
- Olivia Rodrigo
- Sofia Wylie

4 nominations

- Amanda Bynes
- Candace Cameron Bure
- Kaley Cuoco
- Peyton List (3 different roles)
- Alyssa Milano (2 different roles)
- Tia & Tamera Mowry
- Jamie Lynn Spears (2 different shows)
- Zendaya

3 nominations

- Brandy
- Lizzy Greene
- Victoria Justice
- Bridgit Mendler
- Debby Ryan

2 nominations

- Kirstie Alley (2 different roles)
- Ella Anderson
- Roseanne Arnold
- Chloe Bennet
- Quinta Brunson
- Dove Cameron
- Eve
- Sarah Michelle Gellar
- Jennifer Love Hewitt (2 different roles)
- Janelle James
- Laura Marano
- Jennifer Morrison
- Queen Latifah
- Jenna Ortega
- Emma Roberts
- That Girl Lay Lay
- Janice LeAnn Brown
- Maya Le Clark
