= 1992 Kids' Choice Awards =

Children's television awards show program broadcast in 1992

- Date: November 14, 1992
- Location: Universal Studios Hollywood
- Hosted by: Holly Robinson; Brian Austin Green; Tori Spelling

Television/radio coverage
- Network: Nickelodeon
- Produced by: Mark Offitzer
- Directed by: Richie Namm

The 6th Annual Nickelodeon Kids' Choice Awards was held on November 14, 1992, at Universal Studios Hollywood. Holly Robinson, Brian Austin Green, and Tori Spelling hosted the show. This was the first KCA broadcast to be held in the month of November (with the 2026 ceremony being the second), rather than March or April; because of that, a 1993 show was not held due to scheduling conflicts between its mid-November date and the 1994 ceremony in May of that year.

This was also the first Kids' Choice Awards ceremony to be broadcast live.

== Performers ==
Artist(s)	Song(s)
Kris Kross	"Warm It Up"
Joe Public	"Live and Learn"
Shanice	"Saving Forever for You"

The cast of Roundhouse performed during the opening and closing of the show.

== Winners and nominees ==
Winners are listed first, in bold. Other nominees are in alphabetical order.

=== Movies ===
Favorite Movie	Favorite Movie Actor
**The Addams Family**; Boyz n the Hood; My Girl	**Arnold Schwarzenegger** – Terminator 2 as Terminator; Ice Cube – Boyz n the Hood as Darrin "Doughboy" Baker; Kid 'n Play – Class Act as Duncan Pinderhughes and Michael Charles "Blade" Brown
Favorite Movie Actress
**Whoopi Goldberg** – Sister Act as Deloris Van Cartier; Julia Roberts – Hook as Tinker Bell; Michelle Pfeiffer – Batman Returns as Selina Kyle / Catwoman

=== Television ===
Favorite TV Show	Favorite TV Actor
**Beverly Hills, 90210**; In Living Color; The Fresh Prince of Bel-Air	**Bill Cosby** – The Cosby Show as Dr. Heathcliff "Cliff" Huxtable; Luke Perry – Beverly Hills, 90210 as Dylan McKay; Will Smith – The Fresh Prince of Bel-Air as Will Smith
Favorite TV Actress
**Roseanne Arnold** – Roseanne as Roseanne Conner; Christina Applegate – Married... with Children as Kelly Bundy; Jennie Garth – Beverly Hills, 90210 as Kelly Taylor

=== Music ===
Favorite Male Singer/Group	Favorite Female Singer/Group
**Kris Kross**; Boyz II Men; Hammer	**Paula Abdul**; Mariah Carey; En Vogue
Favorite Song
**"Jump"** – Kris Kross; "Ain't 2 Proud 2 Beg" – TLC; "Motownphilly" – Boyz II Men

=== Sports ===
Favorite Male Athlete	Favorite Female Athlete
**Michael Jordan** (Chicago Bulls); Ken Griffey Jr. (Seattle Mariners); Magic Johnson (Los Angeles Lakers)	**Kim Zmeskal** (U.S. Olympic Gymnastics Team); Jackie Joyner-Kersee (U.S. Olympic Track and Field Team); Shannon Miller (U.S. Olympic Gymnastics Team)
Favorite Sports Team
**Chicago Bulls**; Atlanta Braves; Los Angeles Lakers

== Special Recognition ==
=== Hall of Fame ===
- Arnold Schwarzenegger
  - Bill Cosby
  - Michael Jordan
