= 2020 Kids' Choice Awards =

Children's television awards show program broadcast in 2020

Kids' Choice Awards 2020: Celebrate Together
- Date: May 2, 2020
- Location: Virtual
- Hosted by: Victoria Justice
- Most awards: Avengers: Endgame, Frozen II, Henry Danger, Shawn Mendes, and Stranger Things (2)
- Most nominations: Avengers: Endgame (11)

Television/radio coverage
- Network: Nickelodeon; TeenNick; Nicktoons; Nick Jr. Channel (simulcast)
- Runtime: 60 minutes
- Viewership: 0.85 million 2.4 million (total)
- Produced by: Melissa M. Hill

The 33rd Annual Nickelodeon Kids' Choice Awards ceremony (officially titled "Nickelodeon's Kids' Choice Awards 2020: Celebrate Together") was held virtually on May 2, 2020, with Victoria Justice serving as host. It aired on Nickelodeon and in a domestic simulcast with several other ViacomCBS cable networks, and also aired across all of Nickelodeon's international networks. The ceremony reached 2.4 million viewers.

The ceremony was held virtually due to the ongoing COVID-19 pandemic, and it was also the smallest-scale ceremony since 1987, when the first ceremony (titled The Big Ballot) aired as part of the existing series Rated K: For Kids by Kids. The ceremony was made up of pre-recorded award acceptances after voting, a performance from Asher Angel, and the first slime in space, inside the International Space Station. In addition, Nickelodeon presented a $1 million donation to No Kid Hungry in support of children and families affected by the pandemic.

In its originally planned form, the ceremony was to have been held at The Forum in Inglewood, California. Chance the Rapper was originally set to host, with Justin Bieber and Quavo performing their song "Intentions" (which they would later perform in the following year's ceremony). The ceremony was also originally scheduled to coincide with Nickelodeon's SlimeFest weekend of March 21–22, airing on March 22, which would have been the first time the ceremony had aired on a Sunday instead of its traditional Saturday night berth. On March 7, the outdoor aspects of SlimeFest were postponed to a future date due to public health concerns regarding the COVID-19 pandemic, before the network cancelled the event as a whole. The ceremony itself was postponed four days after the SlimeFest postponement. The original timeslot of the ceremony instead contained a "best-of" compilation special.

A rerun of an episode of Danger Force led into the ceremony, while a rerun of an episode of Tyler Perry's Young Dylan served as the lead-out. The series finale of Henry Danger, "The Fate of Danger: Part II", was originally set to serve as the lead-in for the ceremony on March 22. Following the postponement of the ceremony, the Henry Danger finale instead aired on March 21 along with a new episode of Tyler Perry's Young Dylan and a new episode of All That.

== Appearances ==
The following actors, singers, and social media personalities all appeared via remote videotelephony during the ceremony:

- Dwayne Johnson
- Shawn Mendes
- Camila Cabello
- Dove Cameron
- Kristen Bell
- Josh Gad
- Millie Bobby Brown
- The cast members of Stranger Things
  - Millie Bobby Brown
  - Finn Wolfhard
  - Caleb McLaughlin
  - Sadie Sink
  - Noah Schnapp
- Simon Cowell
- Lil Nas X
- Ellen DeGeneres
- JoJo Siwa
- David Dobrik
- Billie Eilish
- LeBron James
- BTS
- SSSniperWolf
- Bill Fagerbakke
- Tom Kenny
- Jace Norman
- The cast members of Henry Danger
  - Michael D. Cohen
  - Jace Norman
  - Cooper Barnes
  - Ella Anderson
  - Sean Ryan Fox
  - Riele Downs
- Annie LeBlanc
- Ariana Grande
- ESA Astronaut Col. Luca Parmitano
- NASA Astronaut Christina Koch
- The cast members of Avengers: Endgame
  - Scarlett Johansson
  - Mark Ruffalo
  - Jeremy Renner
  - Chris Hemsworth
  - Chris Evans
  - Robert Downey Jr.
- Madison Reed (was slimed with her half-sister Victoria Justice)

In addition, Asher Angel performed "All Day" during the ceremony.

== Winners and nominees ==
The nominees were announced and voting opened on February 13, 2020. Voting ended on March 22, 2020. The winners are listed first, highlighted in boldfaced text.

=== Movies ===
Favorite Movie	Favorite Movie Actor
**Avengers: Endgame**; Aladdin; Captain Marvel; Jumanji: The Next Level; Spider-Man: Far From Home; Star Wars: The Rise of Skywalker	**Dwayne Johnson** – Jumanji: The Next Level as Dr. Xander "Smolder" Bravestone & Hobbs & Shaw as Luke Hobbs; Chris Evans – Avengers: Endgame as Steve Rogers / Captain America; Kevin Hart – Jumanji: The Next Level as Franklin "Mouse" Finbar; Chris Hemsworth – Avengers: Endgame as Thor & Men in Black: International as Henry / Agent H; Tom Holland – Spider-Man: Far From Home as Peter Parker / Spider-Man; Will Smith – Aladdin as Genie
Favorite Movie Actress	Favorite Superhero
**Dove Cameron** – Descendants 3 as Mal; Scarlett Johansson – Avengers: Endgame as Natasha Romanoff / Black Widow; Angelina Jolie – Maleficent: Mistress of Evil as Maleficent; Brie Larson – Avengers: Endgame/Captain Marvel as Carol Danvers / Captain Marvel; Taylor Swift – Cats as Bombalurina; Zendaya – Spider-Man: Far From Home as MJ	**Tom Holland** – Spider-Man: Far From Home/Avengers: Endgame as Peter Parker / Spider-Man; Robert Downey Jr. – Avengers: Endgame as Tony Stark / Iron Man; Chris Evans – Avengers: Endgame as Steve Rogers / Captain America; Chris Hemsworth – Avengers: Endgame as Thor; Scarlett Johansson – Avengers: Endgame as Natasha Romanoff / Black Widow; Brie Larson – Avengers: Endgame/Captain Marvel as Carol Danvers / Captain Marvel
Favorite Animated Movie	Favorite Male Voice from an Animated Movie
**Frozen 2**; The Angry Birds Movie 2; The Lego Movie 2: The Second Part; The Lion King; The Secret Life of Pets 2; Toy Story 4	**Josh Gad** – Frozen 2 as Olaf & The Angry Birds Movie 2 as Chuck; Chris Pratt – The Lego Movie 2: The Second Part as Emmet Brickowski and Rex Dangervest; Kevin Hart – The Secret Life of Pets 2 as Snowball; Tom Hanks – Toy Story 4 as Woody
Favorite Female Voice from an Animated Movie
**Beyoncé** – The Lion King as Nala; Idina Menzel – Frozen 2 as Elsa; Kristen Bell – Frozen 2 as Anna; Tiffany Haddish – The Secret Life of Pets 2 as Daisy & The Lego Movie 2: The Second Part as Queen Watevra Wa'Nabi

=== Television ===
Favorite Kids' TV Show	Favorite Family TV Show
**Henry Danger**; A Series of Unfortunate Events; All That; Bunk'd; Power Rangers Beast Morphers; Raven's Home	**Stranger Things**; Fuller House; Modern Family; The Big Bang Theory; The Flash; Young Sheldon
Favorite Male TV Star	Favorite Female TV Star
**Jace Norman** – Henry Danger as Henry Hart/Kid Danger; Abraham Rodriguez – Power Rangers Beast Morphers as Nate Silva/Gold Ranger; Caleb McLaughlin – Stranger Things as Lucas Sinclair; Jim Parsons – The Big Bang Theory as Sheldon Cooper; Joshua Bassett – High School Musical: The Musical: The Series as Ricky Bowen; Karan Brar – Bunk'd as Ravi Ross	**Millie Bobby Brown** – Stranger Things as Eleven; Candace Cameron Bure – Fuller House as D.J. Tanner-Fuller; Ella Anderson – Henry Danger as Piper Hart; Peyton List – Bunk'd as Emma Ross; Raven-Symoné – Raven's Home as Raven Baxter; Riele Downs – Henry Danger as Charlotte Page
Favorite Reality Show	Favorite TV Host
**America's Got Talent**; American Ninja Warrior; America's Funniest Home Videos; MasterChef Junior; The Masked Singer; The Voice	**Ellen DeGeneres** – Ellen's Game of Games; John Cena – Are You Smarter than a 5th Grader?; Nick Cannon – The Masked Singer; Ryan Seacrest – American Idol; Terry Crews – America's Got Talent; Tiffany Haddish – Kids Say the Darndest Things
Favorite Animated Series
**SpongeBob SquarePants**; ALVINNN!!! and the Chipmunks; Teen Titans Go!; The Amazing World of Gumball; The Loud House; The Simpsons

=== Music ===
Favorite Music Group	Favorite Male Artist
**BTS**; Fall Out Boy; Jonas Brothers; Maroon 5; Panic! at the Disco; The Chainsmokers	**Shawn Mendes**; Ed Sheeran; Justin Bieber; Lil Nas X; Marshmello; Post Malone
Favorite Female Artist	Favorite Song
**Ariana Grande**; Beyoncé; Billie Eilish; Katy Perry; Selena Gomez; Taylor Swift	"**Bad Guy**" – Billie Eilish; "7 Rings" – Ariana Grande; "Memories" – Maroon 5; "Old Town Road" – Lil Nas X; "Sucker" – Jonas Brothers; "You Need to Calm Down" – Taylor Swift
Favorite Breakout New Artist	Favorite Music Collaboration
**Lil Nas X**; City Girls; DaBaby; Lewis Capaldi; Lizzo; Megan Thee Stallion	"**Señorita**" – Shawn Mendes & Camila Cabello; "10,000 Hours" – Justin Bieber & Dan + Shay; "I Don't Care" – Ed Sheeran & Justin Bieber; "Me!" – Taylor Swift featuring Brendon Urie; "Old Town Road (Remix)" – Lil Nas X featuring Billy Ray Cyrus; "Sunflower" – Post Malone & Swae Lee
Favorite Social Music Star	Favorite Global Music Star
**JoJo Siwa**; Asher Angel; Blanco Brown; Johnny Orlando; Mackenzie Ziegler; Max and Harvey	**Taylor Swift** (North America); BTS (Asia); Dua Lipa (UK); J Balvin (Latin America); Rosalía (Europe); Sho Madjozi (Africa); Tones and I (Australia)

=== Sports ===
Favorite Male Sports Star	Favorite Female Sports Star
**LeBron James**; Cristiano Ronaldo; Patrick Mahomes; Shaun White; Stephen Curry; Tom Brady	**Alex Morgan**; Lindsey Vonn; Megan Rapinoe; Naomi Osaka; Serena Williams; Simone Biles

=== Miscellaneous ===
Favorite Video Game	Favorite Gamer
**Minecraft**; Fortnite; Mario Kart Tour; Super Smash Bros. Ultimate	**SSSniperWolf**; DanTDM; GamerGirl; Ninja; PrestonPlayz
Favorite Male Social Star	Favorite Female Social Star
**David Dobrik**; Coyote Peterson; Dolan Twins; Dude Perfect; MrBeast; Ryan's World	**Annie LeBlanc**; Emma Chamberlain; Lilly Singh; Liza Koshy; Miranda Sings; Merrell Twins

== Special Recognition ==
=== Generation Change ===
- LeBron James

== International ==
The following are nominations for awards to be given by Nickelodeon's international networks.

Favorite Star (Africa)	Favorite Social Star (Africa)
Sho Madjozi; Patricia Kihoro; Shekhinah; Teni	Prev Reddy (Aunty Shamilla); Anne Kansiime; Chanè Grobler; DJ Cuppy
Favorite Singer (Germany, Austria & Switzerland)	Favorite Song (Germany, Austria, & Switzerland)
Lena Meyer-Landrut; Nico Santos; Mike Singer; LEA; Mark Forster; Wincent Weiss	Lena x Nico Santos – "Better"; Tim Bendzko – "Hoch"; Fargo – "Gutes Gefühl"; LOTTE & Max Giesinger – "Auf das, was noch kommt"; Mark Forster – "194 Länder"; Sarah Connor – "Vincent"
Favorite Social Media Star (Germany, Austria, & Switzerland)	Favorite Social Media Star – The New Generation (Germany, Austria, & Switzerland)
Julia Beautx; Julien Bam; Rebekah Wing; Freshtorge; Dagi Bee; Rezo	Dalia; Leoobalys; valliXpauline; HeyMoritz; Laura Sophie; Lisa Küppers
Favorite Duo (Germany, Austria, & Switzerland)	Favorite Football Player (Germany, Austria, & Switzerland)
HeyMoritz & HeyHorse; Marcus & Martinus; ViktoriaSarina; Die Lochis	Thomas Müller; Timo Werner; Julian Brandt; Matthias Ginter; Luca Waldschmidt; Suat Serdar
Favorite Big Kid (Germany, Austria, & Switzerland)	Favorite Cast (Germany, Austria, & Switzerland)
Julien Bam; Matthias Schweighöfer; Deine Freunde; Freshtorge	The Voice Kids – Coaches; Windstorm 4: Ari's Arrival; Spotlight; Kartoffelsalat 3 – Das Musical
Favorite Nick Team (Germany, Austria, & Switzerland)	Favorite Podcast (Germany, Austria, & Switzerland)
SpongeBob & Patrick (SpongeBob Schwammkopf); Phoebe & Max Thunderman (Thundermans); Greta & Rocco (Spotlight); Kid Danger & Captain Man (Henry Danger); Anika & Sal (Das Geheimnis der Hunters (Hunter Street)); Die Louds (Willkommen bei den Louds (The Loud House))	Hitzefrei! – Der Klima-Podcast für Kinder; Kleine Fragen; Radio TEDDY – Nachgefragt; Schlaulicht
Favorite Artist (Spain)	Favorite Influencer (Spain)
Naim Darrechi; Alexity World; Daniela Blasco Dancer	Jose Julio; Ángela Mármol; Carlota Torres; Natalia Jiménez
Favorite Music Blogger (Russia)	Favorite Music Director (Russia)
Note: Names are translated into English: Misha Smirnov; Milana; Artyom Kay; Kirill Skrypnik	Note: Names are translated into English: Tim Belarusian; Katya Adushkina; JONY; Open Kids
Favorite Creative Blogger (Russia)	Favorite Influencer (Latin America)
Karina Karambaby; Katie Westwood; Humid Peach; Jane Kravitz	Bryan Skabeche; Ana Emilia TV; Daniela Hoyos; Franco Masini; Los Rules; Xime Ponch
Favorite Fandom (Latin America)	Favorite Music Maker (Australia & New Zealand)
Los Polinesios – #Polinesios; Bala – #Balovers; Camilo – #LaTribu; CNCO – #CNCOwners; Juanpa Zurita – #Zuricatas; Lali Espósito – #Lalitas	5 Seconds of Summer; Benee; Dean Lewis; Six60; Tones and I
Favorite Sports Star (Australia & New Zealand)	Favorite Content Creator (Australia & New Zealand)
Ash Barty; Ben Simmons; Ellyse Perry; Mack Horton; TJ Perenara	Georgia Productions; Eystreem; Harvey Petito; Johnny Tuivasa-Sheck; Mariam Star
Favorite Star (Flanders)	Best Fan Squad (Netherlands & Flanders)
Steffi Mercie; IBE; Jade de Rijcke; Nour and Fatma	Gio; Marije Zuurveld; Quinsding; Stien Edlund
Favorite Upcoming Talent (Netherlands & Flanders)	Favorite Artist (Brazil)
Camille Dhont; Amira Tahri; Ridder van Kooten; Silver Metz	Maisa Silva; João Guilherme; Sophia Valverde; Melim; Vitor Kley
Favorite Fandom (Brazil)	Favorite Singer (Italy)
#Uniters – Now United; Larináticos – Larissa Manoela; Luanetes – Luan Santana; Passarinhos – Anavitória; Maisaticos – Maisa Silva; Joaoguináticas – João Guilherme	Mahmood; Alberto Urso; Anastasio; Fred De Palma; Random
Favorite Internet Star (Italy)	Favorite New Star (Italy)
Valeria Vedovatti; Alice De Bortoli; Maria Sole Pollio; Sespo; Sofia Dalle Rive	Cecilia Cantarano; Giulia Savulescu; Maddalena Sarti; Nicolò Robbiano; Rebecca Gradoni
Favorite Star (Arabia)	Favorite Star (Netherlands)
Note: Names are translated into English: Thunayyan Khalid; Ahmed Al Nasheet; Cynthia Samuel; Hala Al Turk	Bibi; Britt Dekker; Fource; Rico Verhoeven
Favorite Star (Poland)	Favorite Influencer (Poland)
Roksana Węgiel; Viki Gabor; AniKa Dąbrowska; 4Dreamers; Damian Kordas	Kinga Sawczuk; Antonina Flak; Dominik Rupinski; Lena Kociszewska
Favorite Internet Star (Portugal)	Favorite Artist (Greece)
Paulo Sousa; Beatriz Frazão; Bernardo Almeida; Sara Carreira	Eleni Foureira; Antonis Remos; Helena Paparizou; Natasha Key; Vangelis Kakouriotis
Favorite Influencer (Greece)	Favorite Music Group (Greece)
Vaso Laskaraki; Am.Konstantina; Lambros Fisfis; Unboxholics	Melisses; AC Squared; Alcatrash; Deevibes
Favorite Star (Hungary)	Favorite Star (Romania)
Liu Shaolin and Liu Shaoang; Puskás Peti; Weisz Fanni; Edina Kulcsár	Andra; Alina Eremia; Gasca Zurli; Irina Rimes
