= 2026 Kids' Choice Awards =

Children's television awards show program broadcast in 2026

- Date: November 14, 2026
- Location: Television City; Los Angeles, California
- Hosted by: Alex Warren

Highlights
- Most awards: Spider-Man: Brand New Day (4)
- Most nominations: Stranger Things (7)

Television/radio coverage
- Network: Nickelodeon; CBS
- Runtime: 92 minutes
- Produced by: Madeleine Hoffman; Derek Litts
- Directed by: James Merryman

The 39th Annual Nickelodeon Kids' Choice Awards ceremony was held on November 14, 2026, at Television City in Los Angeles, California with Alex Warren serving as host. It aired live on Nickelodeon, with a simulcast airing on CBS for the first time.

The ceremony included performances from Jamie Miller, JYT, Ashe, and Sofi Tukker.

The Nickelodeon network premiere of Minions: The Rise of Gru led into the ceremony.

== Appearances ==
Prior to the ceremony, Owen Holt hosted an Orange Carpet livestream on the Nickelodeon YouTube channel.

The ceremony featured appearances by celebrities including Chris Pratt, Teyana Taylor, Keke Palmer, Tony Hawk, Matthew Gray Gubler, Milo Manheim, Meg Donnelly, Alysa Liu, Ginnifer Goodwin, Howie Mandel, Ice Spice, and Quinta Brunson.

Presenters at the 2026 Kids' Choice Awards
Presenter(s)	Role
Keke Palmer	Presented 'Favorite Female Creator'
Alyssa Miles Daniella Monet	Presented 'Favorite Female Sports Star'
Ice Spice	Introduced Sofi Tukker
Quinta Brunson Tyler James Williams	Presented 'Favorite TV Show Reality Competition'
Tony Hawk	Presented 'Favorite Cartoon'
Jackson Olson Stella Lefty	Presented 'Favorite On-Screen Duo/Trio'
Victoria Justice	Presented 'Favorite Female Breakout Artist/Group'
Jude Hill	Presented 'King of Comedy'
Jisoo	Preview of The Angry Birds Movie 3
Alex Warren	Presented Favorite Female TV Star (Kids)' and 'Favorite Male TV Star (Kids)'
Taylen Biggs Matthew Gray Gubler	Introduced Ashe
Teyana Taylor	Presented 'Favorite Female Artist'
Dixie D'Amelio Antonio Cipriano	Presented 'Watch Party: Kids' Choice'

== Winners and nominees ==
The nominees were announced and voting opened on October 8, 2026. This ceremony featured the debuts of categories Watch Party: Kids' Choice, Favorite On-Screen Duo/Trio, and Favorite Clutch Player of the Year. Prior to the full nominees reveal, the Favorite Movie Actress and Favorite Movie Actor nominees were first revealed on CBS Mornings on October 8. The winners are listed first, highlighted in boldfaced text.

=== Movies ===
Favorite Movie	Favorite Movie Actress
**Spider-Man: Brand New Day**; Avatar: Fire and Ash; How to Train Your Dragon; Jurassic World Rebirth; Lilo & Stitch; Moana; Superman; Wicked: For Good	**Zendaya – Spider-Man: Brand New Day as MJ**; Anne Hathaway – The Devil Wears Prada 2 as Andy Sachs; Ariana Grande – Wicked: For Good as Glinda; Catherine Laga'aia – Moana as Moana; Cynthia Erivo – Wicked: For Good as Elphaba; Millie Bobby Brown – Enola Holmes 3 as Enola Holmes; Scarlett Johansson – Jurassic World Rebirth as Zora Bennett; Zoe Saldaña – Avatar: Fire and Ash as Neytiri
Favorite Movie Actor	Favorite Animated Movie
**Tom Holland – Spider-Man: Brand New Day as Peter Parker / Spider-Man**; Adam Sandler – Happy Gilmore 2 as Happy Gilmore; David Corenswet – Superman as Clark Kent / Superman; Dwayne Johnson – Moana as Maui; Hugh Jackman – The Sheep Detectives as George Hardy; John Cena – Coyote vs. Acme as Buddy Crane; Ryan Gosling – Project Hail Mary as Ryland Grace; Zach Galifianakis – Lilo & Stitch as Dr. Jumba Jookiba	**Zootopia 2**; Avatar Aang: The Last Airbender; KPop Demon Hunters; Minions & Monsters; Paw Patrol: The Dino Movie; The SpongeBob Movie: Search for SquarePants; The Super Mario Galaxy Movie; Toy Story 5
Favorite Female Animated Voice from a Movie	Favorite Male Animated Voice from a Movie
**Arden Cho – KPop Demon Hunters as Rumi**; Anya Taylor-Joy – The Super Mario Galaxy Movie as Princess Peach; Brie Larson – The Super Mario Galaxy Movie as Rosalina; Gabrielle Union – Goat as Jett Fillmore; Ginnifer Goodwin – Zootopia 2 as Judy Hopps; Joan Cusack – Toy Story 5 as Jessie; Mckenna Grace – Paw Patrol: The Dino Movie as Skye; Rihanna – Smurfs as Smurfette	**Ahn Hyo-seop – KPop Demon Hunters as Jinu**; Chris Pratt – The Super Mario Galaxy Movie as Mario; Jack Black – The Super Mario Galaxy Movie as Bowser; Jason Bateman – Zootopia 2 as Nick Wilde; Michael B. Jordan – Swapped as Ollie; Tim Allen – Toy Story 5 as Buzz Lightyear; Tom Hanks – Toy Story 5 as Woody; Tom Kenny – The SpongeBob Movie: Search for SquarePants as SpongeBob SquarePants
Watch Party: Kids' Choice	Favorite Villain
**Zombies 4: Dawn of the Vampires**; A Very Jonas Christmas Movie; Camp Rock 3; Clash of the Thundermans; Descendants: Wicked Wonderland; Dora and the Search for Sol Dorado	**Sadie Sink – Spider-Man: Brand New Day as Jean Grey**; Emily Blunt – The Devil Wears Prada 2 as Emily Charlton; Jack Black – The Super Mario Galaxy Movie as Bowser; Jeff Goldblum – Wicked: For Good as The Wonderful Wizard of Oz; John Cena – Coyote vs. Acme as Buddy Crane; Julia Garner – The Fantastic Four: First Steps as Shalla-Bal / The Silver Surfer; Mark Hamill – The SpongeBob Movie: Search for SquarePants as The Flying Dutchman; Zach Galifianakis – Lilo & Stitch as Dr. Jumba Jookiba

=== Television ===
Favorite Kids TV Show	Favorite Family TV Show
**Percy Jackson and the Olympians**; Avatar: The Last Airbender; Soy Luna: Let's Roll Again; The Thundermans: Undercover; Vampirina: Teenage Vampire; Wizards Beyond Waverly Place	**Stranger Things**; Abbott Elementary; Ghosts; Ginny & Georgia; Malcolm in the Middle: Life's Still Unfair; One Piece; Wednesday; XO, Kitty
Favorite TV Show Reality Competition	Favorite Cartoon
**America's Got Talent**; American Idol; American Ninja Warrior; Lego Masters; Survivor; The Voice	**SpongeBob SquarePants**; Big City Greens; Phineas and Ferb; Teen Titans Go!; The Bad Guys: The Series; The Simpsons
Favorite Female TV Star (Kids)	Favorite Male TV Star (Kids)
**Kira Kosarin – The Thundermans: Undercover as Phoebe Thunderman**; Elizabeth Yu – Avatar: The Last Airbender as Azula; Janice LeAnn Brown – Wizards Beyond Waverly Place as Billie; Kenzi Richardson – Vampirina: Teenage Vampire as Vampirina "Vee" Hauntley; Leah Sava Jeffries – Percy Jackson and the Olympians as Annabeth Chase; Maya Le Clark – The Thundermans: Undercover as Chloe Thunderman	**Jack Griffo – The Thundermans: Undercover as Max Thunderman**; Alkaio Thiele – Wizards Beyond Waverly Place as Roman Russo; Aryan Simhadri – Percy Jackson and the Olympians as Grover Underwood; David Henrie – Wizards Beyond Waverly Place as Justin Russo; Gordon Cormier – Avatar: The Last Airbender as Aang; Walker Scobell – Percy Jackson and the Olympians as Percy Jackson
Favorite Female TV Star (Family)	Favorite Male TV Star (Family)
**Jenna Ortega – Wednesday as Wednesday Addams**; Anna Cathcart – XO, Kitty as Kitty; Antonia Gentry – Ginny & Georgia as Ginny Miller; Catherine Zeta-Jones – Wednesday as Morticia Addams; Emma Myers – Wednesday as Enid Sinclair; Millie Bobby Brown – Stranger Things as Eleven; Sadie Sink – Stranger Things as Max Mayfield; Quinta Brunson – Abbott Elementary as Janine Teagues	**Joe Keery – Stranger Things as Steve Harrington**; Bryan Cranston – Malcolm in the Middle: Life's Still Unfair as Hal; Cedric the Entertainer – The Neighborhood as Calvin Butler; David Harbour – Stranger Things as Jim Hopper; Finn Wolfhard – Stranger Things as Mike Wheeler; Frankie Muniz – Malcolm in the Middle: Life's Still Unfair as Malcolm Wilkerson; Isaac Ordonez – Wednesday as Pugsley Addams; Tyler James Williams – Abbott Elementary as Gregory Eddie

=== Music ===
Favorite Female Artist	Favorite Male Artist
**Rosé**; Ariana Grande; Cardi B; Karol G; Miley; Olivia Rodrigo; Sabrina Carpenter; Taylor Swift	**Bruno Mars**; Benson Boone; Drake; Ed Sheeran; Harry Styles; Justin Bieber; Lil Uzi Vert; Tyler, the Creator
Favorite Music Group or Duo	Favorite Female Breakout Artist/Group
**BTS**; Blackpink; Jonas Brothers; Maroon 5; Twenty One Pilots; Weezer	**Katseye**; Adéla; Ella Langley; Olivia Dean; Raye; Stella Lefty
Favorite Male Breakout Artist/Group	Favorite Song
**Sombr**; BigXthaPlug; Don Toliver; Noah Kahan; Role Model; Temper City	**"Swim" – BTS**; "Daisies" – Justin Bieber; "Drop Dead" – Olivia Rodrigo; "Hate That I Made You Love Me" – Ariana Grande; "I Just Might" – Bruno Mars; "Manchild" – Sabrina Carpenter; "The Fate of Ophelia" – Taylor Swift; "The Time of My Life" – Benson Boone
Favorite Song from a Movie	Favorite Viral Song
**"Golden" – Ejae, Audrey Nuna, and Rei Ami (from KPop Demon Hunters)**; "Big Guy" – Ice Spice (from The SpongeBob Movie: Search for SquarePants); "Dream as One" – Miley (from Avatar: Fire and Ash); "For Good" – Cynthia Erivo and Ariana Grande (from Wicked: For Good); "I Knew It, I Knew You" – Taylor Swift (from Toy Story 5); "Just Keep Watching" – Tate McRae (from F1); "Runway" – Lady Gaga and Doechii (from The Devil Wears Prada 2); "Zoo" – Shakira (from Zootopia 2)	**"Man I Need" – Olivia Dean**; "Babydoll" – Jamie Miller; "Boston" – Stella Lefty; "Choosin' Texas" – Ella Langley; "E85" – Don Toliver; "Hit the Wall" – Gracie Abrams; "Tit for Tat" – Tate McRae; "Where Is My Husband!" – Raye
Favorite Music Collaboration	Favorite Album
**"Dracula (with Jennie)" – Tame Impala, Jennie**; "Bloodline" – Alex Warren (with Jelly Roll); "Bring Your Love" – Madonna & Sabrina Carpenter; "Dai Dai" – Shakira, Burna Boy; "I Can't Love You Anymore" – Ella Langley (feat. Morgan Wallen); "Safe" – Cardi B (feat. Kehlani); "Stateside + Zara Larsson" – PinkPantheress, Zara Larsson; "The Life of a Showgirl" – Taylor Swift (feat. Sabrina Carpenter)	**Arirang – BTS**; Am I the Drama? – Cardi B; Iceman – Drake; Man's Best Friend – Sabrina Carpenter; Swag – Justin Bieber; The Romantic – Bruno Mars; The Life of a Showgirl – Taylor Swift; You Seem Pretty Sad for a Girl So in Love – Olivia Rodrigo
Favorite Global Music Star
**Asia: BINI**; Africa: Tyla; Australia: Tame Impala; Europe: Zara Larsson; Latin America: Karol G; North America: Taylor Swift; UK: Olivia Dean

=== Sports ===
Favorite Female Sports Star	Favorite Male Sports Star
**Alysa Liu**; A'ja Wilson; Angel Reese; Caitlin Clark; Chloe Kim; Coco Gauff; Mikaela Shiffrin; Trinity Rodman	**Lionel Messi**; Anthony Edwards; LeBron James; Lewis Hamilton; Patrick Mahomes; Shohei Ohtani; Stephen Curry; Travis Kelce
Favorite Clutch Player of the Year
**Eileen Gu**; Caleb Williams; Freddie Freeman; Hilary Knight; Jack Hughes; Jalen Brunson; Nelly Korda; Shai Gilgeous-Alexander

=== Miscellaneous ===
Favorite On-Screen Duo/Trio	Favorite Female Creator
**Ginnifer Goodwin and Jason Bateman – Zootopia 2 as Judy Hopps and Nick Wilde**; Arden Cho, Ji-young Yoo, and May Hong – KPop Demon Hunters as Rumi, Zoey, and Mira; Ariana Grande and Cynthia Erivo – Wicked: For Good as Glinda and Elphaba; Gaten Matarazzo and Joe Keery – Stranger Things as Dustin Henderson and Steve Harrington; Jamie Lee Curtis and Lindsay Lohan – Freakier Friday as Tess Coleman and Anna Coleman; Jenna Ortega and Emma Myers – Wednesday as Wednesday Addams and Enid Sinclair; Joan Cusack, Tim Allen, and Tom Hanks – Toy Story 5 as Jessie, Buzz Lightyear, and Woody; Meryl Streep and Stanley Tucci – The Devil Wears Prada 2 as Miranda Priestly and Nigel Kipling	**Salish Matter**; Brooke Monk; Charli D'Amelio; Haley Kalil; Lexi Rivera; Pokimane; Sofie Dossi; Taylen Biggs
Favorite Male Creator	Favorite Creator Family
**MrBeast**; Airrack; Dude Perfect; IShowSpeed; Jesser; Kai Cenat; SeanDoesMagic; Unspeakable	**Jordan and Salish Matter**; Earle Family; Familia Diamond; Ninja Kidz TV; The Bucket List Family; The Fun Squad; Vlad and Niki
Favorite Video Game	Favorite Podcast
**Roblox**; Among Us; Avatar Legends: The Fighting Game; Fortnite; Minecraft; Super Mario Bros. Wonder	**LOL Podcast**; Anything Goes with Emma Chamberlain; Avatar: Braving the Elements; Baby, This is Keke Palmer; Hey Jonas!; New Heights with Jason & Travis Kelce; Percy Jackson and the Olympians Official Podcast; Stuff You Should Know

== Special Recognition ==
=== King of Comedy ===
- Chris Pratt

== Multiple nominations ==
Movies with multiple nominations
Movie	Number of Nominations
The Super Mario Galaxy Movie	6
Toy Story 5	6
Wicked: For Good	6
KPop Demon Hunters	5
Zootopia 2	5
The Devil Wears Prada 2	4
Spider-Man: Brand New Day	4
The SpongeBob Movie: Search for SquarePants	4
Avatar: Fire and Ash	3
Lilo & Stitch	3
Moana	3
Coyote vs. Acme	2
Jurassic World Rebirth	2
Paw Patrol: The Dino Movie	2
Superman	2

TV shows with multiple nominations
TV show	Number of nominations
Stranger Things	7
Wednesday	6
Percy Jackson and the Olympians	4
The Thundermans: Undercover	4
Wizards Beyond Waverly Place	4
Abbott Elementary	3
Avatar: The Last Airbender	3
Malcolm in the Middle: Life's Still Unfair	3
Ginny & Georgia	2
Vampirina: Teenage Vampire	2
XO, Kitty	2

People with multiple nominations
Name	Number of nominations
Taylor Swift	6
Ariana Grande	5
Sabrina Carpenter	5
Cardi B	3
BTS	3
Justin Bieber	3
Olivia Dean	3
Cynthia Erivo	3
Ella Langley	3
Bruno Mars	3
Olivia Rodrigo	3
Tim Allen	2
Jason Bateman	2
Jack Black	2
Millie Bobby Brown	2
Benson Boone	2
John Cena	2
Arden Cho	2
Joan Cusack	2
Drake	2
Karol G	2
Zach Galifianakis	2
Ginnifer Goodwin	2
Tom Hanks	2
Tame Impala	2
Joe Keery	2
Zara Larsson	2
Stella Lefty	2
Tate McRae	2
Miley	2
Emma Myers	2
Jenna Ortega	2
Raye	2
Sadie Sink	2
Shakira	2
Don Toliver	2

== Multiple wins ==
Movies with multiple wins
Movie	Number of wins
Spider-Man: Brand New Day	4
KPop Demon Hunters	3
Zootopia 2	2

TV shows with multiple wins
TV show	Number of wins
Stranger Things	2
The Thundermans: Undercover	2

People with multiple wins
Name	Number of wins
BTS	3
Salish Matter	2
