= 2019 Kids' Choice Awards =

Children's television awards show program broadcast in 2019

- Date: March 23, 2019
- Location: Galen Center; Los Angeles, California
- Hosted by: DJ Khaled
- Most awards: Ariana Grande, Avengers: Infinity War, and Hotel Transylvania 3: Summer Vacation (2)
- Most nominations: Avengers: Infinity War (10)

Television/radio coverage
- Network: Nickelodeon; TeenNick; Nicktoons; Nick Jr. (simulcast); Nick Radio
- Runtime: 90 minutes
- Viewership: 1.29 million
- Produced by: Andrea Regalado; Kathryn Rickey
- Directed by: Glenn Weiss

The 32nd Annual Nickelodeon Kids' Choice Awards ceremony was held on March 23, 2019, at the Galen Center in Los Angeles, California with DJ Khaled serving as host. It aired live on Nickelodeon, and was broadcast live or tape delayed across all of Nickelodeon's international networks.

The ceremony, which featured JoJo Siwa as a correspondent alongside Khaled throughout the show, included performances from Migos and the cast of SpongeBob SquarePants: The Musical.

Two series starring Jace Norman were the lead-in and lead-out around the ceremony. A new episode of Henry Danger led into the ceremony, while a sneak peek of the "A-block" of the first episode of The Substitute slotted in between the KCAs and the lead-out (the same Henry Danger episode that led into the ceremony).

== Appearances ==
Prior to the ceremony, Annie LeBlanc and Jayden Bartels hosted an Orange Carpet livestream across Nickelodeon's social media accounts, which included a performance from Ally Brooke.

The ceremony featured appearances by celebrities including Asher Angel, Paris Berelc, Ally Brooke, Noah Centineo, Lana Condor, Eugenio Derbez, David Dobrik, Riele Downs, Ariana Grande, Jack Dylan Grazer, Owen Joyner, Joey King, Liza Koshy, Zachary Levi, Lilimar, Mena Massoud, Caleb McLaughlin, Isabela Moner, Jace Norman, Josh Peck, Daniella Perkins, Chris Pratt, Adam Sandler, Naomi Scott, Kiernan Shipka, Lilly Singh, JoJo Siwa, Will Smith, Scarlet Spencer, Jason Sudeikis, Ryan ToysReview, and Dallas Dupree Young.

Presenters at the 2019 Kids' Choice Awards
Presenter(s)	Role
Liza Koshy Jason Sudeikis	Presented 'Favorite Butt-Kicker'
Bebe Rexha Janelle Monáe	Presented 'Favorite Movie Actress'
Mena Massoud Naomi Scott Will Smith	Preview of Aladdin
Paris Berelc Joel Courtney	Presented 'Favorite Male TV Star'
Jennifer Hudson	Introduced Migos
Josh Peck Kiernan Shipka	Presented 'Favorite Social Star'
SpongeBob SquarePants Patrick Star	Presented 'Favorite Female TV Star', 'Favorite Animated Movie', 'Favorite Male Artist', and 'Favorite Global Music Star'
Riele Downs Jace Norman	Presented 'Favorite Female Artist'
Isabela Moner Michael Peña Eugenio Derbez	Preview of Dora and the Lost City of Gold
JoJo Siwa	Presented 'Favorite Gamer'
Lana Condor Shameik Moore	Presented 'Favorite Movie Actor'
Dallas Dupree Young Scarlet Spencer	Preview of The Secret Life of Pets 2
Daniella Perkins Owen Joyner Lilimar	Kids' Choice Fun Run and presented 'Favorite Funny TV Show'
Asher Angel Jack Dylan Grazer Zachary Levi	Preview of Shazam!
DJ Khaled JoJo Siwa	Presented 'Favorite Social Music Star' and 'Favorite Collaboration'
Ally Brooke Jack & Jack	Introduced cast of SpongeBob SquarePants: The Musical
Lilly Singh Caleb McLaughlin	Presented 'Favorite Male Voice from an Animated Movie'

== Performers ==
Performers at the 2019 Kids' Choice Awards
Performer(s)	Song(s)
Ally Brooke (Orange Carpet)	"Low Key"
DJ Khaled	"All I Do Is Win" "We Will Rock You" (originally performed by Queen)
Migos	"Walk It Talk It" "Stir Fry" "Pure Water"
Cast of SpongeBob SquarePants: The Musical	"Best Day Ever" "SpongeBob SquarePants Theme Song"

== Winners and nominees ==
The nominees were announced and voting opened on February 26, 2019. Voting ended on March 22, 2019. The winners are listed first, highlighted in boldfaced text.

=== Movies ===
Favorite Movie	Favorite Movie Actor
**Avengers: Infinity War**; Aquaman; Black Panther; The Kissing Booth; Mary Poppins Returns; To All the Boys I've Loved Before	**Noah Centineo** – To All the Boys I've Loved Before as Peter Kavinsky; Chadwick Boseman – Black Panther as T'Challa / Black Panther; Chris Evans – Avengers: Infinity War as Steve Rogers / Captain America; Chris Hemsworth – Avengers: Infinity War as Thor; Dwayne Johnson – Skyscraper as Will Sawyer; Jason Momoa – Aquaman as Arthur Curry / Aquaman
Favorite Movie Actress	Favorite Superhero
**Joey King** – The Kissing Booth as Elle Evans; Emily Blunt – Mary Poppins Returns as Mary Poppins; Scarlett Johansson – Avengers: Infinity War as Natasha Romanoff / Black Widow; Lupita Nyong'o – Black Panther as Nakia; Rihanna – Ocean's 8 as Nine Ball; Zoe Saldaña – Avengers: Infinity War as Gamora	**Robert Downey Jr.** – Avengers: Infinity War as Tony Stark / Iron Man; Chadwick Boseman – Black Panther as T'Challa / Black Panther; Chris Evans – Avengers: Infinity War as Steve Rogers / Captain America; Chris Hemsworth – Avengers: Infinity War as Thor; Scarlett Johansson – Avengers: Infinity War as Natasha Romanoff / Black Widow; Jason Momoa – Aquaman as Arthur Curry / Aquaman
Favorite Butt-Kicker	Favorite Animated Movie
**Chris Pratt** – Jurassic World: Fallen Kingdom as Owen Grady; Emilia Clarke – Solo: A Star Wars Story as Qi'ra; Danai Gurira – Black Panther as Okoye; Dwayne Johnson – Skyscraper as Will Sawyer; Michael B. Jordan – Creed II as Adonis "Donnie" Creed; Zoe Saldaña – Avengers: Infinity War as Gamora	**Incredibles 2**; The Grinch; Hotel Transylvania 3: Summer Vacation; Peter Rabbit; Ralph Breaks the Internet; Spider-Man: Into the Spider-Verse
Favorite Male Voice from an Animated Movie	Favorite Female Voice from an Animated Movie
**Adam Sandler** – Hotel Transylvania 3: Summer Vacation as Count Dracula; James Corden – Peter Rabbit as Peter Rabbit; Benedict Cumberbatch – The Grinch as The Grinch; Shameik Moore – Spider-Man: Into the Spider-Verse as Miles Morales; Andy Samberg – Hotel Transylvania 3: Summer Vacation as Jonathan; Channing Tatum – Smallfoot as Migo	**Selena Gomez** – Hotel Transylvania 3: Summer Vacation as Mavis; Kristen Bell – Teen Titans Go! To the Movies as Jade Wilson; Gal Gadot – Ralph Breaks the Internet as Shank; Yara Shahidi – Smallfoot as Brenda; Hailee Steinfeld – Spider-Man: Into the Spider-Verse as Gwen Stacy / Spider-Gwen; Zendaya – Smallfoot as Meechee

=== Television ===
Favorite Funny TV Show	Favorite TV Drama
**Fuller House**; The Big Bang Theory; Bunk'd; Henry Danger; Modern Family; Raven's Home	**Riverdale**; A Series of Unfortunate Events; Chilling Adventures of Sabrina; The Flash; Stranger Things; The Walking Dead
Favorite Male TV Star	Favorite Female TV Star
**Jace Norman** – Henry Danger as Henry Hart / Kid Danger; Karan Brar – Bunk'd as Ravi Ross; Grant Gustin – The Flash as Barry Allen / The Flash; Neil Patrick Harris – A Series of Unfortunate Events as Count Olaf; Caleb McLaughlin – Stranger Things as Lucas Sinclair; Jim Parsons – The Big Bang Theory as Sheldon Cooper	**Zendaya** – K.C. Undercover as K.C. Cooper; Millie Bobby Brown – Stranger Things as Eleven; Candace Cameron Bure – Fuller House as D.J. Tanner-Fuller; Kaley Cuoco – The Big Bang Theory as Penny; Peyton Elizabeth Lee – Andi Mack as Andi Mack; Raven-Symoné – Raven's Home as Raven Baxter
Favorite Reality Show	Favorite TV Host
**America's Got Talent**; American Idol; American Ninja Warrior; Dancing with the Stars: Juniors; Double Dare; The Voice	**Ellen DeGeneres** – Ellen's Game of Games; Tyra Banks – America's Got Talent; Nick Cannon and JoJo Siwa – Lip Sync Battle Shorties; Kevin Hart – TKO: Total Knock Out; Liza Koshy and Marc Summers – Double Dare; Ryan Seacrest – American Idol
Favorite TV Judges	Favorite Cartoon
**Mel B, Simon Cowell, Heidi Klum, and Howie Mandel** – America's Got Talent; Luke Bryan, Katy Perry, and Lionel Richie – American Idol; Len Goodman, Carrie Ann Inaba and Bruno Tonioli – Dancing with the Stars; Sean Combs, DJ Khaled and Meghan Trainor – The Four: Battle for Stardom; Kelly Clarkson, Jennifer Hudson, Adam Levine and Blake Shelton – The Voice; Jennifer Lopez, Derek Hough, and Ne-Yo – World of Dance	**SpongeBob SquarePants**; ALVINNNN!!! and The Chipmunks; The Boss Baby: Back in Business; The Loud House; Rise of the Teenage Mutant Ninja Turtles; Teen Titans Go!

=== Music ===
Favorite Music Group	Favorite Male Artist
**Maroon 5**; Fall Out Boy; The Chainsmokers; Imagine Dragons; Migos; Twenty One Pilots	**Shawn Mendes**; Luke Bryan; DJ Khaled; Drake; Bruno Mars; Justin Timberlake
Favorite Female Artist	Favorite Song
**Ariana Grande**; Beyoncé; Camila Cabello; Cardi B; Selena Gomez; Taylor Swift	**"Thank U, Next"** – Ariana Grande; "Delicate" – Taylor Swift; "In My Blood" – Shawn Mendes; "In My Feelings" – Drake; "Natural" – Imagine Dragons; "Youngblood" – 5 Seconds of Summer
Favorite Breakout Artist	Favorite Collaboration
**Billie Eilish**; Kane Brown; Dan + Shay; Cardi B; Juice WRLD; Post Malone	**"No Brainer"** – DJ Khaled feat. Justin Bieber, Chance the Rapper, and Quavo; "Girls Like You" – Maroon 5 feat. Cardi B; "Happier" – Marshmello feat. Bastille; "I Like It" – Cardi B feat. Bad Bunny and J Balvin; "Meant to Be" – Bebe Rexha feat. Florida Georgia Line; "Sicko Mode" – Travis Scott feat. Drake
Favorite Social Music Star	Favorite Global Music Star
**JoJo Siwa**; Baby Ariel; Chloe x Halle; Jack & Jack; Max & Harvey; Why Don't We	**Taylor Swift** (North America); Davido (Africa); Blackpink (Asia); Troye Sivan (Australia and New Zealand); David Guetta (Europe); J Balvin (Latin America); George Ezra (United Kingdom)

=== Miscellaneous ===
Favorite Video Game	Favorite Gamer
**Just Dance 2019**; Lego The Incredibles; Marvel's Spider-Man; Super Smash Bros. Ultimate; Super Mario Party	**SSSniperWolf**; DanTDM; Jacksepticeye; Markiplier; Ninja; PopularMMOs
Favorite Social Star	How Do You Want to Help?
**David Dobrik**; Emma Chamberlain; Guava Juice; Lilly Singh; Miranda Sings; Ryan ToysReview	**Help Animals** (rescue, wildlife, & more); Help People in Need (homes, food, & more); Help Schools (supplies, STEM, & more); Help the Environment (clean water, recycling, & more); Help Prevent Bullying (positivity, respect, & more)

== International ==
The following are nominations for awards from Nickelodeon's international networks, have the categories and awards presented during continuity during their individual airings of the main American ceremony.

Favorite Star (Netherlands)	Favorite Star (Belgium)
Kraantje Pappie; Djamila; Kalvijn; Britt Scholte; Nina Schotpoort; Royalistiq	Nora Gharib; Stien Edlund; Emma Bale; Sieg de Doncker; JustJade; Tinne Oltmans
Favorite TV Program (Netherlands and Belgium)	Favorite Joker (Netherlands and Belgium)
De Eindmusical; Checkpoint; Nachtwacht; Spangas; De Viral Fabriek; Campus 12	Jeroen van Holland; StukTV; Quinsding; Mark Hoekx; Andy Peelman; Dutchtuber
Favorite Upcoming Talent (Netherlands and Belgium)	Favorite Trending Pinoy (Philippines)
Sterre Koning; Steffi Mercie; Clonny Games; Emma Keuven; Zita Wauters; Summer de Snoo	Kathryn Bernardo; Julia Barretto; Liza Soberano; Yassi Pressman
Favorite Pinoy Internet Star (Philippines)
Ranz Kyle & Niana; Ella Cruz; Hannah Pangilinan; Kristel Fulgar
