= Steve Smith (rugby union, born 1973) =

New Zealand rugby union footballer

- Born: 25 March 1973 (age 53)

Rugby union career
- Position: Lock
Provincial / State sides
Years	Team	Apps	(Points)
- North Harbour
International career
Years	Team	Apps	(Points)
1995–1999	Samoa	8	

Stephen Smith (born 25 March 1973 in New Zealand) is a former Manu Samoa and North Harbour rugby player from New Zealand.

Smith made his international debut for Samoa against Scotland in 1995 at Murrayfield Stadium. He made his last appearance against New Zealand in 1999.
