= 1990 Kids' Choice Awards =

Children's television awards show program broadcast in 1990

- Date: April 23, 1990
- Location: Universal Studios Hollywood
- Hosted by: Dave Coulier; Candace Cameron; David Faustino
- Website: http://www.nick.com/kids-choice-awards

Television/radio coverage
- Network: Nickelodeon
- Produced by: Kimber Rickabaugh
- Directed by: Rick Locke

The 4th Annual Nickelodeon Kids' Choice Awards was held on April 23, 1990, at Universal Studios Hollywood. The show was hosted by Dave Coulier, Candace Cameron and David Faustino. The now-familiar orange blimp-shaped trophy was first awarded at this show.

== Performers ==
Artist(s)	Song(s)
MC Hammer	"U Can't Touch This"
Tommy Page	"I'll Be Your Everything"
Tommy Page	"When I Dream of You"
MC Hammer	"Dancin' Machine"

== Presenters ==
- Brooke Theiss and Michael DeLorenzo - presented Favorite Movie Actor and Favorite Movie
- Kellie Martin and Chris Burke - presented Favorite TV Actress
- Jared Rushton and Dreyfuss the dog - presented Favorite TV Actor
- Jaleel White and Danny Ponce - presented Favorite TV Show
- Kelly Brown and Christine Taylor - presented Favorite Female Athlete and Favorite Male Athlete
- Rain Pryor and Wil Wheaton - presented Favorite Song, Favorite Female Musician/Group and Favorite Male Musician/Group

Co-hosts Candace Cameron and David Faustino also presented the first award of the night, Favorite Movie Actress, as well as the award for Favorite Sports Team.

== Winners and nominees ==
Winners are listed first, in bold. Other nominees are in alphabetical order.

=== Movies ===
Favorite Movie	Favorite Movie Actor
**Look Who's Talking**; Back to the Future Part II; Batman	**Michael J. Fox** – Back to the Future Part II as Marty McFly / Marty McFly Jr. / Marlene McFly; Chevy Chase – National Lampoon's Christmas Vacation as Clark W. "Sparky" Griswold, Jr.; Eddie Murphy – Harlem Nights as Vernest "Quick" Brown
Favorite Movie Actress
**Lea Thompson** – Back to the Future Part II as Lorraine Baines-McFly; Kim Basinger – Batman as Vicki Vale; Kirstie Alley – Look Who's Talking as Mollie Jensen

=== Television ===
Favorite TV Show	Favorite TV Actor
**The Cosby Show**; Doogie Howser, M.D.; Married... with Children	**Kirk Cameron** – Growing Pains as Michael Aaron "Mike" Seaver; Fred Savage – The Wonder Years as Kevin Arnold; Johnny Depp – 21 Jump Street as Officer Thomas "Tom" Hanson
Favorite TV Actress
**Alyssa Milano** – Who's the Boss? as Samantha Micelli; Jasmine Guy – A Different World as Whitley Marion Gilbert; Roseanne Barr – Roseanne as Roseanne Conner

=== Music ===
Favorite Male Musician/Group	Favorite Female Musician/Group
**New Kids on the Block**; Bobby Brown; Bon Jovi	**Paula Abdul**; Debbie Gibson; Janet Jackson
Favorite Song
**"Hangin' Tough"** – New Kids on the Block; "Every Little Step" – Bobby Brown; "Girl You Know It's True" – Milli Vanilli

=== Sports ===
Favorite Male Athlete	Favorite Female Athlete
**Michael Jordan**; Bo Jackson; Magic Johnson	**Jackie Joyner-Kersee**; Katarina Witt; Steffi Graf
Favorite Team
**San Francisco 49ers**; Detroit Pistons; Oakland A's
