= 1994 Kids' Choice Awards =

Children's television awards show program broadcast in 1994

- Date: May 7, 1994
- Location: Pantages Theater; Universal Studios Florida
- Hosted by: Joey Lawrence; Candace Cameron; Marc Weiner

Television/radio coverage
- Network: Nickelodeon
- Produced by: Mark Offitzer
- Directed by: Bruce Gowers

The 7th Annual Nickelodeon Kids' Choice Awards was held on May 7, 1994, at the Pantages Theater in Los Angeles, California. The awards show was hosted by Joey Lawrence and Candace Cameron, with Marc Weiner hosting the east coast portion of the show from Universal Studios Florida. This ceremony was the first KCA broadcast since the 1992 show as Nickelodeon did not produce any KCA show in 1993.

== Performers ==
Artist(s)	Song(s)
Tevin Campbell	"I'm Ready"
Tag Team	"Whoomp! (There It Is)"
All-4-One	"So Much in Love"
Tag Team	"Here It Is, Bam!"

The cast of Roundhouse performed during the opening of the show.

== Winners and nominees ==
Winners are listed first, in bold. Other nominees are in alphabetical order.

=== Movies ===
Favorite Movie	Favorite Movie Actor
**Jurassic Park**; Cool Runnings; Free Willy	**Robin Williams** – Mrs. Doubtfire as Daniel Hillard / Mrs. Euphegenia Doubtfire; Arnold Schwarzenegger – Last Action Hero as Jack Slater / Himself; John Candy – Cool Runnings as Irving "Irv" Blitzer
Favorite Movie Actress
**Whoopi Goldberg** – Sister Act II as Deloris Van Cartier / Sister Mary Clarence & Made in America as Sarah Mathews; Bette Midler – Hocus Pocus as Winifred "Winnie" Sanderson; Lori Petty – Free Willy as Rae Lindley

=== Television ===
Favorite TV Show	Favorite TV Actor
**Home Improvement**; Martin; The Fresh Prince of Bel-Air	**Tim Allen** – Home Improvement as Timothy "Tim" Taylor; Martin Lawrence – Martin as Martin Payne; Will Smith – The Fresh Prince of Bel-Air as Will Smith
Favorite TV Actress
**Candace Cameron** – Full House as D.J. Tanner; Roseanne Arnold – Roseanne as Roseanne Conner; Tisha Campbell – Martin as Gina Waters-Payne

=== Music ===
Favorite Singer	Favorite Music Group
**Whitney Houston**; Janet Jackson; Mariah Carey	**Aerosmith**; Shai; SWV
Favorite Song
**"Whoomp! (There It Is)"** – Tag Team; "Again" – Janet Jackson; "Hey Mr. D.J." – Zhané

=== Sports ===
Favorite Male Athlete	Favorite Female Athlete
**Michael Jordan** (Chicago Bulls); Charles Barkley (Phoenix Suns); Shaquille O'Neal (Orlando Magic)	**Nancy Kerrigan** (Figure skating); Bonnie Blair (Speed skating); Shannon Miller (Gymnastics)
Favorite Sports Team
**Dallas Cowboys**; Chicago Bulls; Phoenix Suns

=== Miscellaneous ===
==== Nick U.K.'s Favorite New Performer ====
- **Let Loose**

== Special Recognition ==
=== Hall of Fame ===
- Michael Jordan
  - Janet Jackson
  - Whoopi Goldberg
