= 2016 Kids' Choice Awards =

Children's television awards show program broadcast in 2016

- Date: March 12, 2016
- Location: The Forum; Inglewood, California
- Hosted by: Blake Shelton

Television/radio coverage
- Network: Nickelodeon; Nick Radio
- Runtime: 90 minutes
- Viewership: 3.32 million
- Produced by: Greg Sills
- Directed by: Joe DeMaio

The 29th Annual Nickelodeon Kids' Choice Awards was held on March 12, 2016, at The Forum in Inglewood, California, live on Nickelodeon and either live or on tape delay across all of Nickelodeon's international networks. Country music singer Blake Shelton hosted the ceremony. A simulcast was also carried in the United States on sister channels Nicktoons, TeenNick, TV Land, and CMT, as well as on Nick Radio, to maximize ratings numbers, the show drew 3,321,000 on Nickelodeon and 4.426 million on all the channels put together.

== Host ==
- Blake Shelton

Pre-show host

- Charlie Puth

== Performers ==
Artist(s)	Song(s)
Charlie Puth (w/ Wiz Khalifa)	"One Call Away" "See You Again"
Silentó	"Watch Me (Whip/Nae Nae)"
DNCE	"Cake by the Ocean"

== Presenters (in order of appearance) ==
Celebrity (ies)	Presented
Will Arnett	Preview of Teenage Mutant Ninja Turtles: Out of the Shadows
Ellen DeGeneres	Favorite Animated Movie
John Stamos; Keke Palmer	Favorite Movie
Heidi Klum; Anthony Anderson	Favorite TV Actress – Kids Show
Cast of Dance Moms	Introduced Charlie Puth and Wiz Khalifa
Grant Gustin; Meghan Trainor	Favorite TV Show – Kids Show
Cast of Game Shakers	Favorite Voice From an Animated Movie
Dove Cameron; Rob Gronkowski	Favorite Music Group
Debby Ryan; Sarah Hyland	Favorite Cooking Show
Jason Sudeikis; Josh Gad	Preview of The Angry Birds Movie
Chris Evans; Robert Downey Jr.	Preview of Captain America: Civil War
Chloe Bennet; Laura Marano	Introduced DNCE

== Winners and nominees ==
- The nominees were announced on February 2, 2016.
- Winners are listed first, in **bold**. Other nominees are in alphabetical order.

=== Movies ===
Favorite Movie	Favorite Movie Actor
**Star Wars: The Force Awakens**; Ant-Man; Avengers: Age of Ultron; Cinderella; Daddy's Home; The Hunger Games: Mockingjay – Part 2; Jurassic World; Pitch Perfect 2	**Will Ferrell** – Daddy's Home as Brad Whitaker; John Boyega – Star Wars: The Force Awakens as Finn; Robert Downey Jr. – Avengers: Age of Ultron as Tony Stark / Iron Man; Chris Evans – Avengers: Age of Ultron as Steve Rogers / Captain America; Chris Hemsworth – Avengers: Age of Ultron as Thor; Chris Pratt – Jurassic World as Owen Grady
Favorite Movie Actress	Favorite Animated Movie
**Jennifer Lawrence** – The Hunger Games: Mockingjay – Part 2 as Katniss Everdeen; Lily James – Cinderella as Cinderella; Scarlett Johansson – Avengers: Age of Ultron as Natasha Romanoff / Black Widow; Anna Kendrick – Pitch Perfect 2 as Beca Mitchell; Daisy Ridley – Star Wars: The Force Awakens as Rey; Rebel Wilson – Pitch Perfect 2 as Patricia "Fat Amy"	**Hotel Transylvania 2**; Alvin and the Chipmunks: The Road Chip; Home; Inside Out; Minions; The Peanuts Movie
Favorite Voice From an Animated Movie
**Amy Poehler** – Inside Out as Joy; Sandra Bullock – Minions as Scarlet Overkill; Selena Gomez – Hotel Transylvania 2 as Mavis D. Loughran; Justin Long – Alvin and the Chipmunks: The Road Chip as Alvin Seville; Jennifer Lopez – Home as Lucy Tucci; Jim Parsons – Home as Oh

=== Television ===
Favorite TV Show – Kids Show	Favorite TV Actor – Kids Show
**The Thundermans**; Austin & Ally; Girl Meets World; Henry Danger; Jessie; Lab Rats: Bionic Island	**Ross Lynch** – Austin & Ally as Austin Moon; Aidan Gallagher – Nicky, Ricky, Dicky & Dawn as Nicky Harper; Jack Griffo – The Thundermans as Max Thunderman; Jace Norman – Henry Danger as Henry Hart; Casey Simpson – Nicky, Ricky, Dicky & Dawn as Ricky Harper; Tyrel Jackson Williams – Lab Rats: Bionic Island as Leo Dooley
Favorite TV Actress – Kids Show	Favorite TV Show – Family Show
**Zendaya** – K.C. Undercover as K.C. Cooper; Dove Cameron – Liv and Maddie as Liv and Maddie Rooney; Lizzy Greene – Nicky, Ricky, Dicky & Dawn as Dawn Harper; Kira Kosarin – The Thundermans as Phoebe Thunderman; Laura Marano – Austin & Ally as Ally Dawson; Debby Ryan – Jessie as Jessie Prescott	**The Muppets**; Agents of S.H.I.E.L.D.; The Big Bang Theory; The Flash; Modern Family; Once Upon a Time
Favorite TV Actor – Family Show	Favorite TV Actress – Family Show
**Jim Parsons** – The Big Bang Theory as Sheldon Cooper; Anthony Anderson – Black-ish as Andre "Dre" Johnson Sr.; Johnny Galecki – The Big Bang Theory as Leonard Hofstadter; Grant Gustin – The Flash as Barry Allen / Flash; Ben McKenzie – Gotham as James Gordon; Rico Rodriguez – Modern Family as Manny Delgado	**Sofía Vergara** – Modern Family as Gloria Pritchett; Chloe Bennet – Agents of S.H.I.E.L.D. as Daisy "Skye" Johnson / Quake; Kaley Cuoco – The Big Bang Theory as Penny; Sarah Hyland – Modern Family as Haley Dunphy; Jennifer Morrison – Once Upon a Time as Emma Swan; Ming-Na Wen – Agents of S.H.I.E.L.D. as Melinda May
Favorite Talent Competition	Favorite Cooking Show
**The Voice**; America's Got Talent; American Idol; Dance Moms; Dancing with the Stars	**Cake Boss**; Cake Wars; Chopped Junior; Diners, Drive-Ins and Dives; Hell's Kitchen; MasterChef Junior
Favorite Cartoon
**SpongeBob SquarePants**; ALVINNN!!! and the Chipmunks; The Amazing World of Gumball; Gravity Falls; Ninjago: Masters of Spinjitzu; Phineas and Ferb; Steven Universe; Teen Titans Go!

=== Music ===
Favorite Music Group	Favorite Male Singer
**Fifth Harmony**; Fall Out Boy; Imagine Dragons; Maroon 5; One Direction; Pentatonix	**Justin Bieber**; Drake; Nick Jonas; Ed Sheeran; Blake Shelton; The Weeknd
Favorite Female Singer	Favorite Song Of The Year
**Ariana Grande**; Adele; Selena Gomez; Nicki Minaj; Taylor Swift; Meghan Trainor	"**Hello**" – Adele; "Bad Blood" – Taylor Swift feat. Kendrick Lamar; "Can't Feel My Face" – The Weeknd; "Hotline Bling" – Drake; "Thinking Out Loud" – Ed Sheeran; "What Do You Mean?" – Justin Bieber
Favorite New Artist	Favorite Collaboration
**Shawn Mendes**; Alessia Cara; DNCE; OMI; Silentó; Walk the Moon	**"See You Again"** – Wiz Khalifa feat. Charlie Puth; "Bad Blood" – Taylor Swift feat. Kendrick Lamar; "Downtown" – Macklemore & Ryan Lewis feat. Eric Nally, Melle Mel, Kool Moe Dee and Grandmaster Caz; "Good for You" – Selena Gomez feat. A$AP Rocky; "Like I'm Gonna Lose You" – Meghan Trainor feat. John Legend; "Where Are Ü Now" – Jack Ü with Justin Bieber

=== Others ===
Favorite Book	Favorite Video Game
**Diary of a Wimpy Kid series**; Diary of a Minecraft Zombie; Harry Potter series; The Hunger Games series; The Maze Runner series; Star Wars: Absolutely Everything You Need To Know	**Just Dance 2016**; Disney Infinity 3.0; Minecraft: Story Mode; Skylanders: SuperChargers; SpongeBob HeroPants; Super Mario Maker

== International ==
=== Asia ===
Favorite Asian Sports Star

- Kim Kurniawan (Indonesia)
- Jeron Teng (Philippines)
- Pandelela Rinong (Malaysia)
- Irfan Fandi (Singapore)

Favorite Pinoy Personality

- Enrique Gil
- James Reid
- Kathryn Bernardo
- Maine Mendoza

=== Australia and New Zealand ===
Favourite Old Fart

- David Koch
- Scott Cam
- Peter Helliar
- Paul “Fatty” Vautin

Favourite Pop Sensation

- 5 Seconds of Summer
- At Sunset
- Jessica Mauboy
- Guy Sebastian

Favourite Sports Star

- Tim Cahill
- Mick Fanning
- Richie McCaw
- Kayla Cullen

Favourite Sports Team

- Wallabies
- All Blacks
- Silver Ferns
- Australian Diamonds

Favourite Social Media Star

- Kristina Webb
- Jamie Curry
- Troye Sivan
- Charli’s Crafty Kitchen

=== Brazil ===
Favorite Brazilian Artist

- Fly
- Anitta
- Biel
- Ludmilla
- MC Gui
- Zé Felipe

=== Latin America ===
Favorite Latin Artist

- Mario Bautista
- Julián Serrano
- Lali Espósito
- María Gabriela de Faría
- Paty Cantú
- Sebastián Villalobos

=== Europe ===
==== France ====
===== Favorite French singer =====
- Black M
- Soprano
- Louane Emera
- Fréro Delavega

==== Italy ====
===== Favorite Italian Singer =====
- The Kolors
- Michele Bravi
- Alessio Bernabei
- Benji e Fede

===== Favorite Italian Youtuber =====
- Sofia Viscardi
- Alberico de Giglio
- Antony di Francesco
- Leonardo Decarli

==== Denmark ====
- Benjamin Lasnier
- Cisilia
- Christopher
- Lukas Graham

==== Germany, Austria, Switzerland ====
===== Favorite Celebrity =====
- Cro
- Mark Forster
- Lena Meyer-Landrut
- Elyas M'Barek

===== Favorite YouTuber =====
- Julien Bam
- Dagi Bee
- Bratayley
- Freshtorge
- EthanGamerTV

==== The Netherlands & Belgium ====
Favorite Dutch Celebrity

- B-Brave
- Chantal Janzen
- Jandino
- MainStreet
- Ronnie Flex
- Timor Steffens

Favorite Flemish Celebrity

- Dimitri Vegas & Like Mike
- Emma Bale
- Ian Thomas
- K3
- Natalia
- Niels Destadsbader

===== Favorite Vlogger =====
- Acid (Belgium)
- Beautynezz (The Netherlands)
- Dylan Haegens (The Netherlands)
- Enzo Knol (The Netherlands)
- Furtjuh (The Netherlands)
- Unagize (Belgium)

==== Poland ====
===== Favorite Polish Star =====
- Dawid Kwiatkowski
- Margaret
- Robert Lewandowski
- Sarsa

==== Portugal ====
- D.A.M.A
- Agir
- Filipe Gonçalves
- Carlão

==== Spain ====
===== Favorite Music Act =====
- Calum
- Lucía Gil
- Maverick
- Sweet California

==== UK & Ireland ====
===== UK Favourite Music Act =====
- Fleur East
- Little Mix
- Nathan Sykes
- One Direction
- Rixton
- The Vamps

===== UK Favourite Tipster =====
- Ethan Gamer TV
- iBallisticSquid
- Alia
- Mr. Stampy Cat
- Spencer FC
- The Diamond Mine Cart

===== UK Favourite Fan Family =====
- Arianators
- Beliebers
- Directioners
- Mixers
- Swifties
- Vampettes

===== UK Favourite Famous Cat =====
- Grumpy Cat
- Meredith Grey
- Olivia Benson
- Prince Essex
- Sam
- Venus

===== UK Favourite Sports Star =====
- Andy Murray
- Ellie Simmonds
- Harry Kane
- Jessica Ennis-Hill
- Lewis Hamilton
- Steph Houghton

===== UK Favourite Breakthrough Vlogger =====
- Cherry Wallis
- Jazzybum
- Mynameschai
- Noodlerella
- Raphael Gomes
- Sam King FTW

===== UK Favourite Music Video =====
- "Hello" by Adele
- "Sax" by Fleur East
- "Hold My Hand" by Jess Glynne
- "Black Magic" by Little Mix
- "Drag Me Down" by One Direction
- "We All Want the Same Thing" by Rixton

=== Slimed Celebrities ===
- Blake Shelton- The host was the mystery celebrity slimed at the end of the show.
- Fifth Harmony- The girls were slimed whilst collecting the 'Best Female Group' award.

=== Middle East and North Africa ===
Favorite Arab Act

- Hala Al Turk
- Hamza Hawsawi
- Mohammed Assaf
- THE 5
