= List of Chicken Soup for the Soul books =

Chicken Soup for the Soul is a series of books, usually featuring a collection of short, inspirational stories and motivational essays. The 101 stories in the first book of the series were compiled by motivational speakers Jack Canfield and Mark Victor Hansen.

There have been numerous volumes of Chicken Soup issued.

== Original ==
- Chicken Soup for the Soul – #1 New York Times Bestseller (1993)
  - A 2nd Helping of Chicken Soup for the Soul (1994)
  - A 3rd Serving of Chicken Soup for the Soul (1996)
  - A 4th Course of Chicken Soup for the Soul, Jack Canfield, Mark Victor Hansen, Hanoch McCarty and Meladee McCarty (1997)
  - A 5th Portion of Chicken Soup for the Soul (1998)
  - A 6th Bowl of Chicken Soup for the Soul (1999)
  - Condensed Chicken Soup for the Soul, Jack Canfield, Mark Victor Hansen & Patty Hansen – a compilation of stories from Chicken Soup for the Soul, A 2nd Helping and A 3rd Serving (1996)
  - A Cup of Chicken Soup for the Soul, Jack Canfield, Mark Victor Hansen and Barry Spilchuk (2001)
- Chicken Soup for Little Souls Reader, Jack Canfield, Mark Victor Hansen, Lisa McCourt and Tim Ladwig – in a format which can be read by parents to their children

== A-B ==
- Chicken Soup for the Adopted Soul, Jack Canfield, Mark Victor Hansen, LeAnn Thieman L.P.N. (1998)
- Chicken Soup for the African American Soul, Jack Canfield, Mark Victor Hansen and Lisa Nichols (2004)
- Chicken Soup for the African American Woman's Soul, Jack Canfield, Mark Victor Hansen, Lisa Nichols and Tom Joyner (2005)
- Chicken Soup for the Soul of America, Jack Canfield, Mark Victor Hansen and Matthew E. Adams (2002)
- Chicken Soup for the American Idol Soul, Jack Canfield, Mark Victor Hansen, Debra Poneman (2007)
- Chicken Soup for the Soul: Angels Among Us (2013)
- Chicken Soup for the Soul: Angels and Miracles(2016)
- Chicken Soup for the Soul: Answered Prayers (2011)
- Chicken Soup for the Baseball Fan's Soul, Jack Canfield, Mark Victor Hansen, Mark Donnelly, Chrissy Donnelly and Tommy Lasorda (2001)
- Chicken Soup for the Soul: Be the Best You Can Be (2015)
- Chicken Soup for the Beach Lover's Soul, Jack Canfield, Mark Victor Hansen, Patty Aubery and Peter Vegso (2007)
- Chicken Soup for the Soul: Best Mom Ever (2017)
- Chicken Soup for the Soul: A Book of Miracles (2010)
- Chicken Soup for the Breast Cancer Survivor's Soul, Jack Canfield, Mark Victor Hansen and Mary Olsen Kelly (2006)
- Chicken Soup for the Bride's Soul (2004)

== C-D ==
- Chicken Soup for the Cancer Survivor's Soul, Jack Canfield, Mark Victor Hansen, Patty Aubery and Beverly Katherine Kirkhart (1996)
- Chicken Soup for the Caregiver's Soul, Jack Canfield, Mark Victor Hansen and LeAnn Thieman (2004)
- Chicken Soup for the Soul Cartoons for Dads, Jack Canfield, Mark Victor Hansen and John McPherson (2012)
- Chicken Soup for the Soul Cartoons for Moms, Jack Canfield, Mark Victor Hansen, John McPherson (2003)
- Chicken Soup for the Soul Cartoons for Teachers, Jack Canfield, Mark Victor Hansen and John McPherson (2004)
- Chicken Soup for the Soul: The Cat Did What?? (2014)
- Chicken Soup for the Cat Lover's Soul, Mark Victor Hansen, Marty Becker D.V.M., Carol Kline, and Amy D. Shojai (2009)
- Chicken Soup for the Cat & Dog Lover's Soul (1999)
- Chicken Soup for the Soul Celebrates Cats and the People Who Love Them, Jack Canfield, Mark Victor Hansen and Sharon Wohlmuth (2004)
- Chicken Soup for the Soul Celebrates Mothers, Jack Canfield, Mark Victor Hansen and Sharon J. Wohlmuth (2003)
- Chicken Soup for the Soul Celebrates Sisters, Jack Canfield, Mark Victor Hansen and Maria Stave (2004)
- Chicken Soup for the Soul Celebrates Teachers, Jack Canfield, Mark Victor Hansen and Sharon J. Wohlmuth (2012)
- Chicken Soup for the Soul Celebrating Brothers and Sisters, Jack Canfield, Mark Victor Hansen, Dahlynn McKowen and Ken McKowen (2012)
- Chicken Soup for the Soul Celebrating Mothers and Daughters, Jack Canfield, Mark Victor Hansen, Frances Firman Salorio and Dorothy Firman (1997)
- Chicken Soup for the Soul: Celebrating People Who Make a Difference, Jack Canfield, Mark Victor Hansen, Peter Vegso and Theresa Peluso (2012)
- Chicken Soup for the Child's Soul, Jack Canfield, Mark Victor Hansen, Patty Hansen, and Irene Dunlap (2012)
- Chicken Soup for the Soul, Children with Special Needs, Jack Canfield, Mark Victor Hansen, Karen Simmons, Heather McNamara (2012)
- Chicken Soup for the Soul in the Classroom – High School Edition, Jack Canfield, Mark Victor Victor Hansen and Anna Unkovich (2012)
- Chicken Soup for the Coffee Lover's Soul, Jack Canfield, Mark Victor Hansen and Theresa Peluso (2007)
- Chicken Soup for the Soul Cookbook, Jack Canfield, Mark Victor Hansen, and Diana von Welanetz Wentworth. Includes material by Barbara Halloran Gibbons. (1995)
- Chicken Soup for the Couple's Soul, Jack Canfield, Mark Victor Hansen, Mark & Chrissy Donnelly, and Barbara DeAngelis (1999)
- Chicken Soup for the Country Soul, Jack Canfield, Mark Victor Hansen and Ron Camacho (1998)
- Chicken Soup for the Soul Country Music (2011)
- Chicken Soup for the College Soul, Jack Canfield, Mark Victor Hansen, Kim Kirberger and Dan Clark (1999)
- Chicken Soup for the Canadian Soul, Jack Canfield, Mark Victor Hansen, Raymond Aaron and Janet Matthews (2002)
- Chicken Soup for the Chiropractic Soul, Jack Canfield, Mark Victor Hansen, Dr. Fabrizio Mancini (2002)
- Chicken Soup for the Christian Family Soul, Jack Canfield, Mark Victor Hansen, Patty Aubery and Nancy Mitchell Autio (2000)
- Chicken Soup for the Christian Teenage Soul, Jack Canfield, Mark Victor Hansen, Kimberly Kirberger, Patty Aubery and Nancy Mitchell-Autio (2003)
- Chicken Soup for the Christian Soul, Jack Canfield, Mark Victor Hansen, Patty Aubery & Nancy Mitchell (1997)
- Chicken Soup for the Christian Soul 2, Jack Canfield, Mark Victor Hansen, and Leann Thieman L.P.N. (2012)
- Chicken Soup for the Christian Woman's Soul, Jack Canfield, Mark Victor Hansen, Patty Aubery and Nancy Mitchell Autio (2012)
- Chicken Soup for the Soul Christmas, Jack Canfield and Mark Victor Hansen (2012)
- Chicken Soup for the Soul: Christmas in Canada (2014)
- Chicken Soup for the Soul Christmas Magic, Jack Canfield, Cheri Eplin (2010)
- Chicken Soup for the Soul Christmas Treasury, Jack Canfield, Mark Victor Hansen (2002)
- Chicken Soup for the Soul Christmas Treasury for Kids, Jack Canfield, Mark Victor Hansen, Patty Hansen, and Irene Dunlap (2002)
- Chicken Soup for the Soul Healthy Living Series: Weight Loss, Jack Canfield, Mark Victor Hansen and Andrew Larson, M.D. – combines inspirational stories with medical advice (2005)
- Chicken Soup for the Cat and Dog Lover's Soul, Jack Canfield, Mark Victor Hansen, Marty Becker, D.V.M. and Carol Kline (2012)
- Chicken Soup for the Soul: Count Your Blessings (2009)
- Chicken Soup for the Soul Create Your Best Future (2015)
- Chicken Soup for the Soul "The Dating Game" (2013)
- Chicken Soup for the Dental Soul, Jack Canfield (1999)
- Chicken Soup for the Dieter's Soul, Jack Canfield, Mark Victor Hansen and Theresa Peluso (2006)
- Chicken Soup for the Soul:Divorce and Recovery(2008)
- Chicken Soup for the Soul: The Dog Did What? (2014)
- "Chicken Soup For The Dog Lover's Soul", Jack Canfield, Mark Victor Hansen, Marty Becker, D.V.M., Carol Kline and Amy D. Shojai (2012)
- Chicken Soup for the Soul: Dreams and Premonitions(2015)

== E-G ==
- Chicken Soup for the Entrepreneur's Soul, Jack Canfield, Mark Victor Hansen, Dahlynn McKowen and Tom Hill
- Chicken Soup for the Soul Empty Nesters
- Chicken Soup for the Every Mom's Soul, Jack Canfield, Mark Victor Hansen, Heather McNamara, and Marci Shimoff
- Chicken Soup for the Expectant Mother's Soul, Jack Canfield, Mark Victor Hansen, Patty Aubery & Nancy Mitchell
- Chicken Soup for the Soul "Family Matters"
- Chicken Soup for the Father's Soul, Jack Canfield, Mark Victor Hansen, Jeff Aubery, Mark and Chrissy Donnelly
- Chicken Soup for the Father and Daughter's Soul, Jack Canfield, Mark Victor Hansen
- Chicken Soup for the Father and Son's Soul, Jack Canfield, Mark Victor Hansen, Ted Slawski, and Dorothy Firman
- Chicken Soup for the Soul: Find Your Happiness
- Chicken Soup for the Soul: Find Your Inner Strength
- Chicken Soup for the Soul: "Finding My Faith"
- Chicken Soup for the Fisherman's Soul, Jack Canfield, Mark Victor Hansen, Ken McKowen and Dahlynn McKowen
- Chicken Soup for the Soul: Food and Love
- Chicken Soup for the Gardener's Soul, Jack Canfield, Mark Victor Hansen, Cynthia Brian, Cindy Buck, Marion Owen, Pat Stone and Carol Sturgulewski
- Chicken Soup for the Soul: The Gift of Christmas
- Chicken Soup for the Girlfriend's Soul, Jack Canfield, Mark Victor Hansen, Mark Donnelly, Chrissy Donnelly and Stefanie Adrian
- Chicken Soup for the Girl's Soul, Jack Canfield, Mark Victor Hansen, Patty Hansen and Irene Dunlap
- Chicken Soup for the Golden Soul, Jack Canfield, Mark Victor Hansen, Paul J. Meyer, Barbara Russell Chesser, Ph.D., Amy Seeger
- Chicken Soup for the Soul "The Golf Book"
- Chicken Soup for the Golfer's Soul, Jack Canfield, Mark Victor Hansen, Jeff Aubery, Mark and Chrissy Donnelly (1999)
  - Chicken Soup for the Golfer's Soul – The 2nd Round, Jack Canfield, Mark Victor Hansen, Jeff Aubery, Mark and Chrissy Donnelly
- Chicken Soup for the Soul: Grand and Great
- Chicken Soup for the Grandma's Soul: Stories to Honor and Celebrate the Ageless Love of Grandmothers, Jack Canfield, Mark Victor Hansen and Leann Thieman L.P.N.
- Chicken Soup for the Soul to Grandma, with Love, Jack Canfield and Mark Victor Hansen
- Chicken Soup for the Grandparent's Soul, Jack Canfield, Mark Victor Hansen, Hanoch McCarty and Meladee McCarty
- Chicken Soup for the Grieving Soul
- Chicken Soup for the Soul Grieving and Recovery

== H-M ==
- Chicken Soup for the Soul: Happily Ever After
- Chicken Soup for the Soul: Here Comes the Bride
- Chicken Soup for the Soul: Home Sweet Home
- Chicken Soup for the Soul: Hope and Miracles
- Chicken Soup for the Horse Lover's Soul, Jack Canfield, Mark Victor Hansen, Marty Becker, D.V.M., Gary Seidler, Peter Vegso and Theresa Peluso
- Chicken Soup for the Horse Lover's Soul II, Jack Canfield, Mark Victor Hansen, Marty Becker, D.V.M., Gary Seidler, and Peter Vegso
- Chicken Soup from the Soul of Hawaii, Jack Canfield, Mark Victor Hansen, Sharon Linnea and Robin Stephens Rohr
- Chicken Soup for the Soul: Hooked on Hockey
- Chicken Soup for the Soul: I Can't Believe My Cat Did That
- Chicken Soup for the Soul: I Can't Believe My Dog Did That
- Chicken Soup for the Indian Teenage Soul
- Chicken Soup for the Soul "Inspiration for the Young at Heart"
- Chicken Soup to Inspire the Body and Soul, Jack Canfield, Mark Victor Hansen, Dan Millman and Diana von Welanetz Wentworth
- Chicken Soup for the Soul: To Inspire a Woman's Soul
- Chicken Soup for the Soul: Inspiration for Nurses, Amy Newmark, LeAnn Thieman
- Chicken Soup for the Soul: It's Christmas
- Chicken Soup for the Jewish Soul, Jack Canfield, Mark Victor Hansen and Rabbi Dov Peretz Elkins (2001)
- Chicken Soup for the Soul: The Joy of Adoption
- Chicken Soup for the Soul "The Joy of Less"
- Chicken Soup for the Soul: Just Us Girls
- Chicken Soup for the Soul: Kids in the Kitchen, Jack Canfield, Mark Victor Hansen, Antonio Frontera
- Chicken Soup for the Kid's Soul, Jack Canfield, Mark Victor Hansen, Patty Hansen and Irene Dunlap (1998)
- Chicken Soup for the Kid's Soul 2, Jack Canfield, Mark Victor Hansen, Patty Hansen and Irene Dunlap
- Chicken Soup for the Latino Soul, Jack Canfield, Mark Victor Hansen and Susan Sanchez-Casal
- Chicken Soup for the Latter-day Saint Soul, Jack Canfield, Mark Victor Hansen, Peg Fugal, and Sherm Fugal
- Chicken Soup for the Soul "The Laughing Soul" ** Audio only
- Chicken Soup for the Soul:Lemons to Lemonade
- Chicken Soup for the Little Souls, Jack Canfield, Mark Victor Hansen and Lisa McCourt
- Chicken Soup for the Soul "Like Mother, Like Daughter"
- Chicken Soup for the Soul: Living With Alzheimer's and Other Dementias
- Chicken Soup for the Soul Love Stories: Stories of First Dates, Soul Mates, and Everlasting Love, Jack Canfield, Mark Victor Hansen, and Peter Vegso
- Chicken Soup for the Soul:Loving Our Dogs
- Chicken Soup for the Soul:The Magic of Mothers and Daughters
- Chicken Soup for the Soul in Menopause, Jack Canfield, Mark Victor Hansen and Dahlynn McKowen
- Chicken Soup for the Soul "Married Life"
- Chicken Soup for the Soul "Merry Christmas"
- Chicken Soup for the Soul: Messages From Heaven
- Chicken Soup for the Military Wife's Soul, Jack Canfield, Mark Victor Hansen and Charles Preston and Cindy Pedersen
- Chicken Soup for the Soul: Miraculous Messages from Heaven
- Chicken Soup for the Soul: Miracles Happen
- Chicken Soup for the Soul: Moms and Sons
- Chicken Soup for the Soul to Mom, with Love, Jack Canfield and Mark Victor Hansen
- Chicken Soup for the Mother of Preschooler's Soul, Mark Victor Hansen, Jack Canfield, Maria Nickless and Elisa Morgan
- Chicken Soup for the Mother's Soul, Jack Canfield, Mark Victor Hansen, Jennifer Read Hawthorne and Marci Shimoff (1997)
- Chicken Soup for the Mother's Soul 2, Jack Canfield, Mark Victor Hansen, Marci Shimoff and Carol Kline
- Chicken Soup for the Mother and Daughter Soul, Jack Canfield, Mark Victor Hansen, Dorothy Firman, Julie Firman and Frances Firman Salorio
- Chicken Soup for the Mother and Son Soul, Jack Canfield, Mark Victor Hansen, LeAnn Thieman L.P.N. and Barbara LoMonaco
- Chicken Soup for the Soul: The Multitasking Mom's Survival Guide
- Chicken Soup for the Soul "My Very Good, Very Bad Cat"
- Chicken Soup for the Soul "My Very Good, Very Bad Dog"

== N-P ==
- Chicken Soup for the NASCAR Soul, Jack Canfield, Mark Victor Hansen, Matthew E. Adams, Jeff Aubery, Kirk Autio
- Chicken Soup for the Nature Lover's Soul, Jack Canfield, Mark Victor Hansen and Steve Zikman
- Chicken Soup for the New Mom's Soul, Jack Canfield, Mark Victor Hansen and Patty Aubery
- Chicken Soup for the Soul: New Moms
- Chicken Soup for the Network Marketer's Soul, Jack Canfield, Mark Victor Hansen and Bill Hyman
- Chicken Soup for the Nurse's Soul, Jack Canfield, Mark Victor Hansen, Nancy Mitchell Autio, R.N. & LeAnn Thieman, L.P.N.
- Chicken Soup for the Nurse's Soul: Second Dose, Jack Canfield, Mark Victor Hansen and LeAnn Thieman L.P.N.
- Chicken Soup for the Soul: O'Canada The Wonders of Winter
- Chicken Soup for the Ocean Lover's Soul, Jack Canfield, Mark Victor Hansen and Wyland
- Chicken Soup for the Soul: Older and Wiser
- Chicken Soup for the Parent's Soul, Jack Canfield, Mark Victor Hansen, Kim Kirberger and Raymond Aaron
- Chicken Soup for the Soul: Parenthood
- Chicken Soup for the Preteen Soul, Jack Canfield, Mark Victor Hansen, Patty Hansen and Irene Dunlap
- Chicken Soup for the Preteen Soul 2, Jack Canfield, Mark Victor Hansen, Patty Hansen and Irene Dunlap
- Chicken Soup for the Soul "Power of Gratitude"
- Chicken Soup for the Soul "Power Moms"
- Chicken Soup for the Pet Lover's Soul, Jack Canfield, Mark Victor Hansen, Marty Becker, D.V.M. & Carol Kline (1998)
- Chicken Soup for the Soul: The Power of Forgiveness
- Chicken Soup for the Soul: The Power of Positive
- Chicken Soup for the Prisoner's Soul, Jack Canfield, Mark Victor Hansen and Tom Lagana

== R-S ==
- Chicken Soup for the Soul:Reboot Your Life
- Chicken Soup for the Soul:Raising Great Kids
- Chicken Soup for the Soul:Reader's Choice
- Chicken Soup for the Soul: "Recovering from Traumatic Brain Injuries"
- Chicken Soup for the Recovering Soul, Robert Ackerman, Peter Vegso, Theresa Peluso and Jack Canfield
- Chicken Soup for the Romantic Soul, Jack Canfield, Mark Victor Hansen, Mark & Chrissy Donnelly, Barbara DeAngelis and Trish Vradenburg
- Chicken Soup for the Scrapbooker's Soul, Jack Canfield, Mark Victor Hansen, Allison Connors and Debbie Haas
- Chicken Soup for the Shopper's Soul, Jack Canfield, Mark Victor Hansen, Theresa Peluso and Morgan St. James
- Chicken Soup for the Single's Soul, Jack Canfield, Mark Victor Hansen, Jennifer Read Hawthorne, Marci Shimoff (1999)
- Chicken Soup for the Single Parent's Soul, Jack Canfield, Mark Victor Hansen, Laurie Hartman and Nancy Vogl
- Chicken Soup for the Sister's Soul, Patty Mitchell Aubery, Nancy Mitchell Autio, Heather McNamara, Katy McNamara, Jack Canfield and Mark Victor Hansen
- Chicken Soup for the Sister's Soul 2, Jack Canfield, Mark Victor Hansen, Patty Mitchell Aubery, Kelly Zimmerman
- Chicken Soup for the Sports Fan's Soul, Jack Canfield, Mark Victor Hansen, Mark Donnelly, Chrissy Donnelly and Jim Tunney
- Chicken Soup for the Soul: Stories for a Better World, Jack Canfield, Mark Victor Hansen, Bradley Winch and Susanna Palomares
- Chicken Soup for the Soul The Story Behind the Song
- Chicken Soup for the Soul: For the Surviving Soul

== T-W ==
- Chicken Soup for the Tea-Lover's Soul, Jack Canfield, Mark Victor Hansen and Patricia Lorenz
- Chicken Soup for the Soul: Teacher Tales
- Chicken Soup for the Teacher's Soul
- Chicken Soup for the Teen's Soul, Mark Victor Hansen, Stephanie H. Meyer, John Meyer and Jack Canfield
- Chicken Soup for the Soul: Teens Talking Faith,
- Chicken Soup for the Teenage Soul (1997)
- Chicken Soup for the Teenage Soul II, Jack Canfield, Mark Victor Hansen and Kimberly Kirberger (1998)
- Chicken Soup for the Teenage Soul III (2000)
- Chicken Soup for the Teenage Soul IV
- Chicken Soup for the Teenage Soul "Letters"
- Chicken Soup for the Teenage Soul Personal Organizer September 1999 to December 2000
- Chicken Soup for the Teenage Soul on Love & Friendship
- Chicken Soup for the Teenage Soul on Tough Stuff
- Chicken Soup for the Teenage Soul: The Real Deal Challenges, Jack Canfield, Mark Victor Hansen and Deborah Reber
- Chicken Soup for the Teenage Soul: The Real Deal Friends, Jack Canfield, Mark Victor Hansen and Deborah Reber
- Chicken Soup for the Teenage Soul: The Real Deal School, Jack Canfield, Mark Victor Hansen and Deborah Reber
- Chicken Soup for the Teenage Soul: Think Positive, Jack Canfield, Mark Victor Hansen and Amy Newmark
- Chicken Soup for the Soul: Thanks Mom
- Chicken Soup for the Soul: Thanks to My Mom
- Chicken Soup for the Soul: Think Positive
- Chicken Soup for the Soul "Think Possible"
- Chicken Soup for the Soul: Think Positive for Kids
- Chicken Soup for the Soul: Time to Thrive
- Chicken Soup for the Soul: Touched By an Angel
- Chicken Soup for the Soul: Tough Times Tough People
- Chicken Soup for the Traveler's Soul, Jack Canfield, Mark Victor Hansen and Steve Zikman
- Chicken Soup for the Soul: A Tribute to Moms, Jack Canfield, Mark Victor Hansen and Patty Aubery
- Chicken Soup for the Soul: True Love
- Chicken Soup for the Soul: Unlocking the Secrets to Living Your Dreams, Jack Canfield and Mark Victor Hansen
- Chicken Soup for the Unsinkable Soul, Jack Canfield, Mark Victor Hansen and Heather McNamara (1999)
- Chicken Soup for the Veteran's Soul, Jack Canfield, Mark Victor Hansen and Sidney R. Slagter
- Chicken Soup for the Volunteer's Soul, Jack Canfield, Mark Victor Hansen, Arline McGraw Oberst, John T. Boal, Tom Lagana and Laura Lagana
- Chicken Soup for the Soul: Volunteering and Giving Back
- Chicken Soup for the Soul: What I Learned From The Dog
- Chicken Soup for the Writer's Soul, Jack Canfield, Mark Victor Hansen and Bud Gardner
- Chicken Soup for the Woman's Soul, Jack Canfield, Mark Victor Hansen, Jennifer Read Hawthorne (1996)
- Chicken Soup to Inspire a Woman's Soul, Jack Canfield, Mark Victor Hansen and Stephanie Marston Marci Shimoff – #1 New York Times Bestseller
- A Second Chicken Soup for the Woman's Soul, Jack Canfield, Mark Victor Hansen, Jennifer Hawthorne and Marci Shimoff (1998)
- Chicken Soup for the Soul: Woman to Woman
- Chicken Soup for the Woman Golfer's Soul, Patty Aubery, Jack Canfield, Mark Victor Hansen and Matthew E. Adams
- Chicken Soup for the Soul at Work, Jack Canfield, Mark Victor Hansen, Maida Rogerson and Martin Rutte (1996)
- Chicken Soup for the Working Woman's Soul, Jack Canfield, Mark Victor Hansen, Patty Aubery, and Chrissy & Mark Donnelly
- Life Lessons For Women, Jack Canfield, Mark Victor Hansen and Stephanie Marston
- Sopa de Pollo para el Alma de los Padres, Jack Canfield, Mark Victor Hansen, Kimberly Kirberger and Raymond Aaron – in Spanish
