= Chicken Soup for the Soul Entertainment =

American media company (2016–2024)

Chicken Soup for the Soul Entertainment, Inc.
- Type: Public
- Traded as: Expert Market: CSSEQ
- Industry: Entertainment
- Founded: June 9, 2016; 10 years ago
- Founders: William J. Rouhana, Jr.
- Defunct: July 10, 2024; 2 years ago
- Fate: Chapter 7 bankruptcy liquidation
- Headquarters: Cos Cob, Connecticut, U.S.
- Area served: Worldwide
- Parent: Chicken Soup for the Soul
- Subsidiaries: Halcyon Studios; Screen Media; Foresight Unlimited; Crackle; 1091 Pictures; Redbox; Popcornflix

Chicken Soup for the Soul Entertainment, Inc. was an American media company based in Cos Cob, Connecticut. Established in 2016, it was a subsidiary of the publisher Chicken Soup for the Soul.

== History ==
In 2008, the founders of Chicken Soup for the Soul, Jack Canfield and Mark Victor Hansen, sold the company to a group led by William J. Rouhana and Robert D. Jacobs.

In 2013, the company announced plans to produce a television series and a film with Alcon Entertainment. Chicken Soup for the Soul produced television programming with other partners, including PBS. In 2016, Chicken Soup for the Soul acquired a majority stake in the website A Plus.

Chicken Soup for the Soul Entertainment went public in 2017. In November 2017, it acquired Screen Media Ventures, LLC, an independent television and film distribution company, which included Popcornflix, an ad-based online video service.

On March 28, 2019, Sony Pictures Television announced that it would sell a majority stake of Sony Crackle to Chicken Soup for the Soul Entertainment, after which the service would revert to the "Crackle" name.

On November 5, 2019, it was announced that the Chicken Soup for the Soul Entertainment division would purchase foreign sales company Foresight Unlimited for the new Screen Media division.

On December 15, 2020, Sony traded its remaining shares in Crackle for a yet to be disclosed preferential stake in Chicken Soup for the Soul Entertainment, giving them full control of the ad-supported streaming service.

In April 2021, Chicken Soup for the Soul acquired the film and television catalogue of Sonar Entertainment. In return, Sonar will hold a 5 percent stake in a new AVOD network featuring its library. Through the acquisition, Chicken Soup now currently owns the North American rights to a majority of the Laurel & Hardy films and shorts, and most of the Our Gang library, as well as the holdings of the former RHI/Hallmark/Cabin Fever/Sonar outputs, and a majority of the Hal Roach library, all via their Halcyon Studios division.

On March 2, 2022, Chicken Soup for the Soul Entertainment announced its acquisition of specialty film distributor, 1091 Pictures, for $15.55 million, in a mix of cash ($8 million) and stock (newly issued Series A preferred stock and Class A common stock). The deal included an estimated 4,000 movies and TV series from the 1091 catalog, as well as its portfolio of free, ad-supported networks and channels.

On May 11, 2022, Chicken Soup for the Soul Entertainment announced its intention to acquire Redbox for $357 million ($36 million in stock and $321 million in assumed debt). The acquisition closed on August 11, 2022.

=== Bankruptcy and liquidation ===
On April 1, 2024, Chicken Soup for the Soul Entertainment received a delisting notice from Nasdaq, informing that the company's stock would be delisted from the Nasdaq after it had 180 days to return to compliance.

On April 23, 2024, Chicken Soup for the Soul Entertainment announced a $636.6 million loss in 2023, and warned that without any options to generate additional financing, the company may be forced to liquidate or pause operations, and seek a potential Chapter 11 bankruptcy protection filing. In June 2024, chairman and CEO Bill Rouhana removed the company's board of directors. On June 29, the company filed for Chapter 11 bankruptcy protection after cutting benefits in May, missing a week of paying its employees, and failing to secure financing.

On July 1, 2024, former federal prosecutor Bart Schwartz replaced Rouhana as CEO, and a new board of directors was installed. On July 5, the company was able to secure funding to restore payroll and benefits.

On July 10, 2024, a bankruptcy judge ordered Chicken Soup for the Soul Entertainment's Chapter 11 bankruptcy to be converted into a Chapter 7 bankruptcy liquidation after accusing Rouhana of misusing the business and failing to pay employees or support healthcare. With the Chapter 7 conversion, the company's assets would be liquidated, resulting in the cessation of its subsidiaries, including Crackle, Popcornflix, Redbox and Screen Media. In addition, over 1,000 employees were laid off and over 26,000 Redbox kiosks were shut down permanently.

On April 7, 2025, a bankruptcy auction was set for April 23. CSSE's liquidation was completed by June 2025. Following this, private capital group, HPS Investment Partners, which had been a lender to CSSE, assumed control of the company's assets.
