= List of I'm in the Band episodes =

I'm in the Band is an American situation comedy series which aired on Disney XD. It ran for two seasons, with a total of 41 episodes airing from November 27, 2009 to December 9, 2011.

== Series overview ==
Season	Episodes	Originally released	
Season	Episodes	First released	Last released
1	21	November 27, 2009	November 8, 2010
2	20	January 17, 2011	December 9, 2011

== Episodes ==
=== Season 1 (2009–10) ===
No. overall	No. in season	Title	Directed by	Written by	Original release date	Prod. code
1	1	"Weasels in the House"	Shelley Jensen	Michael B. Kaplan & Ron Rappaport	November 27, 2009	108
Tripp Campbell wins the chance to have dinner with his favorite band, Iron Weasel. He uses the opportunity to audition as the band's new lead guitarist. He later books them to perform at his high school, fooling the band into thinking they are being honored as "Band of the Century", but they are actually crashing a teacher appreciation assembly. In the end, the band is hurt when they learn that the whole thing was a teacher appreciation assembly and that Tripp had tricked them. But despite this, the guys understand why Tripp lied. They then accept him as the newest member of Iron Weasel. Iron Weasel song(s) featured: "Weasel Rock You" (The theme song played in the beginning of every episode) Guest stars: Beth Littleford as Beth Campbell, Reginald VelJohnson as Principal Strickland, Aaron Albert as Jared, Brad Grunberg as DJ Fat Man Notes: A reference to the series' original name Viper Slap is made in which during a Music Awards Show, a band named "Viper Slap" wins a set of awards, in which Iron Weasel steal.; This episode premiered as "sneak preview" after the world premiere of the Disney XD original film Skyrunners, the following episode was promoted as the show's "premiere" episode.
2	2	"I Wanna Punch Stuff"	Adam Weissman	Eric Friedman	January 18, 2010	106
After Tripp is dumped by Lana, he takes out his anger by writing a song called "I Wanna Punch Stuff". Later, Tripp invites Iron Weasel's former roadie-turned-MMA fighter "Ernesto the Besto", who wants revenge after they accidentally pantsed him during his proposal to his girlfriend, declaring that he will 'destroy them'. Tripp, who was unaware of the incident until after he invited Ernesto, confronts him by offering to let him use his song as Ernesto's entrance music for his fight. Tripp, however, gets back together with Lana and is too lovesick to put more anger into the second half of the song. The band members of Iron Weasel get Lana to dump Tripp again so he will be angry enough to finish Ernesto's song by lying to her and saying he is seeing another girl named Angie (which is actually what Tripp calls his guitar). After performing the finished song at Ernesto's fight, Derek accidentally pants' Ernesto again with his microphone stand, making him so mad that he is later jailed for "running rampant through town, pantsing innocent, pants-wearing bystanders". Iron Weasel song(s) featured: "I Wanna Punch Stuff" Guest stars: Hollywood Yates as Ernesto, Katelyn Pacitto as Lana Absent: Caitlyn Taylor Love as Izzy Note: This is the first time Caitlyn Taylor Love is absent and first cast member absent. Also, Caitlyn Taylor Love will be the only I'm in the Band cast member absent.
3	3	"Slap Goes the Weasel"	Gerry Cohen	Denise Stasichin	January 25, 2010	105
Iron Weasel is boycotted when they are blamed for uploading a video of their signature "Weasel Slap" handshake, which ended up hurting a child fan, Charles, who tried the move on roller skates at the top of a stairwell. They are instructed to write an apology song for Charles and perform it live in front of a news crew. Charles stays the night as they draft the song and drives them crazy with his short temper and continually threatening to call the news reporter in order to make them do whatever he wants. Tripp eventually comes up with a plan to get back at Charles: during the song they sing, they continuously call him "Chucky", a nickname that he hates being called because "it rhymes with 'Sucky'", which makes him throw a destructive tantrum in front of the reporter and gets them off the hook. Iron Weasel song(s) featured: "Our Friend Chucky" Guest stars: Reginald VelJohnson as Principal Strickland, Anne-Marie Johnson as Janet King, Aaron Albert as Jared, Zayne Emory as Charles Albertson Note: When Izzy auditions to be Iron Weasel's backup singer for their upcoming gig, she sings one of their songs. However, they did not create this song until "Birthdazed".
4	4	"Annoying Arlene"	Shelley Jensen	Ron Rappaport	February 1, 2010	102
Tripp finds out Barry Roca, famous record producer is the father of his annoying, rich classmate, Arlene Roca. Tripp asks Arlene to give Barry an Iron Weasel demo CD, but realizes too late that the CD has the song "Annoying Arlene" on it, which Tripp recorded to test out the band's new recording equipment. Tripp, Derek, Burger and Ash must find a way to take the CD back before Barry listens to it and their chance of a recording deal slips away. Meanwhile, Tripp also pursues foreign exchange student Bianca Ortega, Arlene's arch rival who lives with the Rocas as they are her host family. The band sneak into Arlene's house, with Tripp taking Arlene out on a date after pressure from the band, and attempt to switch the CDs behind Arlene's back. After Bianca sees Tripp with Arlene, Tripp pretends to be Arlene's boyfriend when Arlene threatens to not give the demo CD to Barry, and then, in order for the band to escape the house unnoticed, he makes Arlene and Bianca get into a heated disagreement about whether "Arlene came back from Spain by choice" or "Spain sent Arlene back". At the end, the band realize that they have accidentally given Barry Tripp's mother's version of "I'll Never Learn", the song that was on the demo CD. Iron Weasel song(s) featured: "I'll Never Learn", "Annoying Arlene" Guest star: Beth Littleford as Beth Campbell, Raini Rodriguez as Arlene Roca, Carlos Alazraqui as Barry Roca, Camila Banus as Bianca Ortega
5	5	"Got No Class"	Shelley Jensen	Rick Nyholm	February 8, 2010	110
Tripp and the band shoot a music video at his school for their song, "Got No Class", and have disguises ready to put on, in case Principal Strickland (Reginald VelJohnson) finds them. The band heckles Ash for almost blowing their cover, so he quits the band and decides to become a full time janitor, where he is appreciated. Tripp, Derek and Burger need to make Ash feel appreciated and convince him to come back to the band instead of continuing to be a janitor at Tripp's school. Iron Weasel song(s) featured: "Got No Class" Guest stars: Reginald VelJohnson as Principal Strickland, Aaron Albert as Jared, Zack Ward as Xander Absent: Caitlyn Taylor Love as Izzy
6	6	"Cat-Astrophe"	Shelley Jensen	Michael B. Kaplan	February 15, 2010	103
Arlene invites Tripp and his band mates over to her house for a gathering that honors the demise of Hip Hop. The band is overjoyed at the opportunity to impress Arlene's record-producer father with their rock 'n' roll song "Pretty Bitter," and celebrate the demise of hip hop music and the resurgence of rock 'n' roll. Unbeknownst to the band, Arlene actually invited them at a funeral of her deceased cat named Hip Hop, rather than at an industry party. At Arlene's house, Burger's guitar electrocutes him and also touches the funeral bed of Hip Hop. Iron Weasel, not knowing Hip Hop is already dead, think they killed the cat. They hide it in one of the serving dishes and wreck the dinner, and accidentally put an entree in Hip Hop's funeral bed. Iron Weasel manages to turn their misunderstanding around and awe Barry with a rock song honoring Hip Hop the cat. In the end, the guys have a funeral for Ash's fish who had just died. The band is proud to present Ash with a new fish, "Sushi II". Unfortunately, when Burger tries to play a song in honor of the first Sushi, his bass electrifies Sushi II's fishbowl. They then have a second funeral. Iron Weasel song(s) featured: "Pretty Bitter/Kitty Litter" Guest stars: Carlos Alazraqui as Barry Roca, Raini Rodriguez as Arlene Roca Absent: Caitlyn Taylor Love as Izzy This episode marks not only the second, but the last appearance of Arlene Roca
7	7	"Flip of Doom"	Shelley Jensen	Richard Gurman	February 22, 2010	109
Iron Weasel is set to compete in a televised "Rock Off" against the reigning champs, the Diamond Sharks, who are basically female versions of Iron Weasel. While Tripp is worried the band won't be able to pull off their famous stunt, the Flip of Doom, where they all do a front-flip and land together in the middle of the stage, the Diamond Sharks try to use their charm to distract Iron Weasel and sabotage their chances at winning. After trying too hard to perfect the stunt, they are unable to do it and use stunt doubles. However, they end up getting caught and lose. In the end, they all go out with their Diamond Sharks counterparts. Iron Weasel song(s) featured: "Pull My Finger" Guest stars: Ian Reed Kesler as Stu Littwin, Kathryn Zenna as Devon, Rakefet Abergel as Bertha Absent: Caitlyn Taylor Love as Izzy
8	8	"Birthdazed"	Shelley Jensen	Richard Gurman	March 15, 2010	101
Tripp's birthday arrives with Beth (Tripp's mom) and Iron Weasel throwing him a party on the same day because he couldn't bring himself to turn down Beth's annual traditions and Iron Weasel surprises him with another party despite him telling them he had to study. Beth throws him a kids party with his family in the living room, while Iron Weasel throw him a rocker party in the garage. He doesn't want to upset anyone so he keeps dashing from place to place. In the end, everyone finds out but Beth lets Tripp have the rocker party, understanding that he needs to grow up. The band perform the love song that they have been trying to write, inspired by Tripp's mother's lullaby. Iron Weasel song(s) featured: "You're My Baby" Guest stars: Beth Littleford as Beth Campbell, Aaron Albert as Jared, Grayson Russell as Martin, Eve Brenner as Grandma Nana Note: This is actually the first produced episode of the series.
9	9	"Geezers Rock!"	Rich Correll	Ron Rappaport	April 30, 2010	113
Iron Weasel decide to record a charity single for Tripp's grandmother's retirement home. But when the band purposely spends the money from the song on a sky-diving trip, they must perform community service to pay off their debt to the home or else they would go to jail. They help them put on a show in which they perform "I Wanna Punch Stuff", but end up trashing the place. Iron Weasel song(s) featured: "Geezers Rock!", "I Wanna Punch Stuff" Guest stars: Eve Brenner as Grandma Nana, James Hong as Leon, Tom Fitzpatrick as Harry, Regan Burns as Mr. Morton Absent: Caitlyn Taylor Love as Izzy
10	10	"Spiders, Snakes, and Clowns"	Paul Lazarus	Ryan Levin	May 7, 2010	107
Tripp gets Iron Weasel parts in a horror movie being filmed at his school called "Spiders, Snakes, and Clowns". Unfortunately, the band is too scared to be a part of it, Burger being afraid of spiders, Derek being afraid of snakes, and Ash being afraid of clowns. Izzy tries to convince the eccentric director Kaz Ridley, who makes all of his decisions based on how angry he is, to let her be the part of the film only to be constantly ignored. Tripp gets a cool role in the movie, but tries to back out when Kaz reveals that there will be a scene where he pees his pants, his greatest fear. When Kaz threatens to cut the band from the movie if Tripp doesn't pee his pants, the others overcome their fears and perform with Tripp getting Jared to be a stand-in for the pants scene. After spending all day trying to get Kaz's attention, Izzy gets to be a nerd in the film while the real nerd next to her will play a cheerleader. Iron Weasel song(s) featured: "Spiders, Snakes, and Clowns" Guest stars: Khary Payton as Kaz Ridley, Aaron Albert as Jared
11	11	"Magic Tripp"	Adam Weissman	Michael B. Kaplan	June 28, 2010	112
Tripp convinces Iron Weasel's former manager Vic Blaylock, from Scottsdale, Arizona to meet for dinner and consider representing them again. Everything goes smoothly until Tripp touches Derek's motorcycle wrecking it causing Derek to lash out at Burger and Ash thinking they wrecked it. Vic Blaylock then becomes uncomfortable because it was the band's frequent arguing that led him to quit as the band's manager. At a last resort, Derek performs some magic tricks with Tripp to win him over, which doesn't go to plan and Tripp stands up to Vic, saying that he is the problem, not the band's constant arguing and needs to loosen up before he is right to manage them. Iron Weasel song(s) featured: "Face Down in a Plate of Nachos" Guest star: Adam Kulbersh as Vic Blaylock
12	12	"What Happened?"	Shelley Jensen	Ryan Levin	July 5, 2010	115
A number of unfortunate events occur, delaying Iron Weasel from performing at a huge concert: Burger constantly knocks himself out throughout the trip due to his hand being stuck in a vase and the others need to keep bringing him up to speed, Ash gets stuck in a pickle costume when the zipper breaks, the band van breaks down on the highway, and a pregnant woman named Iris, who is Iron Weasel's biggest fan and offered to drop them off at the concert, goes into labor which forces Derek to deliver the baby. Thankfully, this allows the band to be given a ride to the concert by ambulance. Despite missing the concert, the band play their new song for Iris and her new baby, whom Derek names "Derek Jr." since he was the one who delivered the baby. Iron Weasel song(s) featured: "Rock Hard or Go Home" Guest star: Jillian Bach as Iris Absent: Caitlyn Taylor Love as Izzy Note: The episode is a parody of the 2009 comedy film The Hangover.
13	13	"Road Tripp"	Rich Correll	Rick Nyholm	July 12, 2010	104
Tripp books a concert tour for Iron Weasel but the cramped space of the band van annoys the members interfering with making it to their gigs. In the first gig, only one guy shows up. The second gig is country style. Tripp calls a radio station and advertises their third gig, making it extremely successful. Iron Weasel song(s) featured:"Band Van" Guest stars: Beth Littleford as Beth Campbell, Aaron Albert as Jared, Alicia Favela as Stacy Absent: Caitlyn Taylor Love as Izzy Note: This episode premiered in Disney Channel Hong Kong on June 25, 2010 and on Disney XD UK and Ireland on June 16, 2010. Also, Burger mentions Zeke from Zeke and Luther.
14	14	"Prank Week"	Shelley Jensen	Mike Montesano & Ted Zizik	July 19, 2010	117
Tripp plots revenge on the Iron Weasel after they embarrass him with a not-so-funny prank in front of his date, as well as the entire school. He messes with their heads by not pranking them at first. His big prank is getting Ernesto to come over and act like he is going to destroy them, then having cops come over and make it look like they will get arrested. Ernesto and the band make up, but then Derek pantses him again and he once again wants to destroy them. Meanwhile, Izzy is determined to pull a prank on Tripp. Guest stars: Hollywood Yates as Ernesto, Alicia Favela as Stacy
15	15	"Money Bags"	Shelley Jensen	Rick Nyholm	July 26, 2010	116
Tripp gets back with Lana and encourages her to be less materialistic. But with Lana's new attitude means that she will not splurge money unnecessarily, that includes not hiring Iron Weasel for her birthday party and multiple monthly parties. Derek, Burger and Ash come up with a plan to try to change her attitude by throwing a party for Izzy to make Lana jealous. After Lana becomes obsessed with money again, she won't hire Iron Weasel because she is going out with her ex-boyfriend Bryce Johnson. Guest stars: Katelyn Pacitto as Lana, Spencer Boldman as Bryce Johnson Note: This episode premiered in Disney XD Latin America on July 18, 2010.
16	16	"Bleed Guitarist"	Shelley Jensen	Ron Rappaport	August 23, 2010	120
Iron Weasel's former guitarist, Bleed, shows up and plots to have Tripp kicked out of the band. He blames Tripp for breaking his guitar, and he gets a gig at an 18 and older club which Tripp can't play at. Meanwhile, Izzy, who has a gigantic crush on Bleed, follows him everywhere and reveals what he did. When they discover Bleed's treachery, Tripp challenges him to a guitar duel, which Tripp wins. Iron Weasel song(s) featured: "Pretty Ugly" Guest star: Bryan Callen as Bleed Note: This episode premiered in Disney XD Latin America on August 16, 2010.
17	17	"Weasels on Deck"	Shelley Jensen	Michael B. Kaplan	October 11, 2010	204
Iron Weasel are aboard the S.S. Tipton. Because they snuck onto the ship, they pretend to be a group of contortionist brothers, but the actual contortonist brothers are jewel thieves who are being hunted down by the police of their native country. Because of this predicament, the band seeks help from Cody and Zack Martin. They do get to perform for Mr. Tipton thanks to Ash's apology to Mr. Moseby for abandoning him years ago to join Iron Weasel. Iron Weasel song(s) featured: "Smells Like Fun" Special guest stars: Dylan and Cole Sprouse as Zack and Cody Martin, Phill Lewis as Marion Moseby Guest stars: JB Blanc as Agent Yurislavislavislavi, Lamont Johnson as Security Guard Absent: Caitlyn Taylor Love as Izzy Note : This episode is a crossover with The Suite Life on Deck. Production Note: This episode was aired in the middle of Season 1 though it was produced with the Season 2 episodes; thus it is a special airing of a Season 2 episode.
18	18	"Izzy Gonna Sing?"	Shelley Jensen	Michael B. Kaplan	October 18, 2010	119
After getting a gig at a night club that goes way back with the band, Derek loses his voice from celebrating. Meanwhile, Izzy is persistent in singing with group, so she makes her own demo and gives it to Tripp. Tripp doesn't listen to it until Ash accidentally turns it on. When they ask her to fill in, she refuses because Tripp had called her dreams "rock fantasies". Eventually, she gives in. Later, at the club, Derek's voice returns and Izzy can't sing lead anymore. Tripp feels bad for her and tricks Derek into losing his voice again. Tripp then announces that Izzy will be filling in for Derek. In the end, she becomes an "honorary Weasel". Iron Weasel song(s) featured: "I Got Your Back" Guest star: Mitch Silpa as Jimmy Howard Note: This episode also premiered on Disney XD Latin America on August 14, 2010.
19	19	"Weasels vs. Robots"	Adam Weissman	Eric Friedman	October 25, 2010	111
The band comes to Career Fair at Tripp's school and steals "Jared's thunder" about being cool for a day, leaving Tripp to choose between the band and his friendship with Jared. Tripp manages to solve the conflict by sabotaging the band's performance and getting both the band and Jared on the cover. Beth wants to be a cooler mom so she quits her job as dental hygienist to become a psychologist. She eventually goes back to her old job because she can't even help Tripp with his problem. Iron Weasel song(s) featured: "Band Van" Guest stars: Beth Littleford as Beth Campbell, Aaron Albert as Jared, Adam Busch as Shane Hackman
20	20	"Happy Fun Metal Rock Time"	Rich Correll	Steve Jarczak & Shawn Thomas	November 1, 2010	114
Tripp books the band to appear in the Japanese game show "Happy Fun Metal Rock Time" which is being hosted at Tripp's house. But after accidentally spilling blue paint all over Principal Strickland, Principal Strickland gives Tripp detention. In the end, Beth feels sorry for Tripp missing the interview and gets him, but Tripp convinces Jared to take the detention, in time for Iron Weasel to perform, although Tripp and Jared didn't make the switch so Jared ends up playing for the band and Tripp arrives to play, but Beth realizes it, Tripp gets in trouble and the band did not get the "Gong of Approval" which makes all of Japan buy their music. Iron Weasel song(s) featured: "Pretty Bitter" Guest stars: Beth Littleford as Beth Campbell, Reginald VelJohnson as Principal Strickland, Aaron Albert as Jared, Trieu Tran as Yutaka Oka, Julia Cho as Miki, Jim Hoffmaster as Phil Absent: Caitlyn Taylor Love as Izzy Notes: This episode premiered in Disney XD Latin America on July 4, 2010. Also, it was banned in Japan due to parodying the Japanese cultures.; This is the last appearance of Jared.
21	21	"Last Weasel Standing"	Shelley Jensen	Denise Stasichin	November 8, 2010	118
The band gets their own reality show without Tripp knowing about it. But when the ratings are not what they expected, the guys decide to fabricate some arguing to encourage viewership. It works at first, but soon the insults hurt their feelings and they end up fighting for real. Thanks to this, the four of them compete for a solo record deal. After hearing all of the nice things they all had to say about each other as not just band members, but as friends, thankfully the band comes to their senses and they apologize. In the end, Tripp gets the band back together to sing and protest against the director. Iron Weasel song(s) featured: "Pull My Finger", "That's the Weasel Way" Guest star: Jeff Meacham as Larry Absent: Caitlyn Taylor Love as Izzy Note: This episode premiered in Disney XD Latin America on August 1. Every time Burger got hit with tubes, he makes references to NBA players like Yao Ming, Pau Gasol, Ray Allen, Manu Ginóbili, Dirk Nowitzki etc.

=== Season 2 (2011) ===
No. overall	No. in season	Title	Directed by	Written by	Original release date	Prod. code
22	1	"I'm Out of the Band"	Shelley Jensen	Michael B. Kaplan & Ron Rappaport	January 17, 2011	201–202
Tripp joins arch-rival rock band Metal Wolf (a parody of Kiss) after they entice him with more fame and fortune than he could get with Iron Weasel, leaving the guys in a panic to get him back. Derek, Ash and Burger try to lure Tripp back before Metal Wolf's concert at the Super Bowl where Tripp will sign a contract putting him in Metal Wolf for good. Meanwhile, Tripp hates being in Metal Wolf after discovering that they only pretend to be crazy rockers for the money and are actually just a bunch of lazy pompous fops who make Izzy wax their limo and eventually leave her behind where the others find her. They try to follow Tripp into the stadium, but a security guard reveals that they are banned for life because they released live weasels into the stadium the last time they performed there and then released coyotes to get rid of the weasels. After Izzy inadvertently distracts security so that Iron Weasel can sneak into the stadium, they find Metal Wolf as they reveal that they have a giant fan that will make them hover in the air while they perform. Tripp pretends to sign the contract in order to get Iron Weasel to admit how much they need and appreciate him before revealing that he had signed the paper with "Fluff your cupcakes, you sellout phonies!" They all admonish Metal Wolf for being an embarrassment to rock n' roll before trapping them backstage by turning on their giant fan to pin the frauds to the wall. Iron Weasel is able to perform their new song although they are eventually kicked out. Iron Weasel song(s) featured: "Never Turning Back" Guest stars: Mark Gagliardi as Savage, Randy Sklar as Blaze, Jason Sklar as Claw, Eve Brenner as Grandma Nana, Jerry Rice as himself Notes: This is a special hour-long episode. Though not the first episode of the season to air, it was promoted as the second season opener and is also the first one in production order.
23	2	"Iron Weasel: The Video Game"	Shelley Jensen	Eric Friedman	January 24, 2011	203
The guys get a chance to get their own Iron Weasel video game developed by Gamer Planet, but prove themselves too demanding to Ms. Dempsey, the kid founder of the company, and the creation of their game was declined. The band decides to sneak into Gamer Planet and try to create the game themselves, but end up getting caught arguing and behaving like toddlers. The band receives "Iron Weasel: Baby Fight", a game based on their behavior. Iron Weasel song(s) featured: "Rock Hard or Go Home" Guest stars: G. Hannelius as Miss Dempsey, Amir Talai as Avi Patel Absent: Caitlyn Taylor Love as Izzy Note: This is the first time G. Hannelius and Stephen Full work together. The second time is in the 2012 Disney Channel Series Dog With A Blog. G. Hannelius plays the lead, Avery Jennings and Stephen Full voices Stan, the dog.
24	3	"Extreme Weasel Makeover"	Joel Zwick	Richard Gurman	January 31, 2011	209
Iron Weasel attempts to get Simon Craig, a famed music producer, to sign them on as clients. But when Simon makes them change their entire image, music and name to "Thunder Monkey", the guys need to rethink their decision to stay with him. Meanwhile, Ash has been bitten by a venomous spider on both hands. During a live webcast, the band announces that they are still Iron Weasel and discover that it was all a test to see if they were true to themselves and get a record deal. Iron Weasel song(s) featured: "Weasel Rock You", "Monkey Rock You" Special guest star: Alan Thicke as Simon Craig Absent: Caitlyn Taylor Love as Izzy
25	4	"Camp Weasel Rock"	Victor Gonzalez	Rick Nyholm	February 7, 2011	205
Iron Weasel decides to make a camp to teach little kids how to rock, but the kids get out of hand. They then find out that one of the children is the son of legendary rocker Eddie Nova and must try to convince his son Eddie Nova Jr., to abandon classic music and take on rock. They realize that the little kid is rebelling and turn the concert into an orchestra. Iron Weasel song(s) featured: "Pull My Finger" (Orchestra) Guest stars: Harry Van Gorkum as Eddie Nova, Atticus Shaffer as Eddie Nova Jr., Tristan Pasterick as T.J., Haley Tju as Zoey
26	5	"Chucky's Revenge"	Joel Zwick	David Shayne	February 28, 2011	210
Iron Weasel get their personal cutouts made by Simon Craig while he's waiting for them to write a new song and perform it in his studio, but the band hasn't written a song yet. The next day, they visit Simon Craig Records and tell Simon to let off some stress by going to the spa. In return, Simon asks that the band babysit his stepson Charles Albertson aka Chucky, the same Chucky that drove the band crazy in the episode "Slap Goes the Weasel". Chucky tries to convince them he has changed and everyone but Tripp believes him. Chucky pulls a prank and glues all of their hands together, revealing that he does in fact want revenge for the events of "Slap Goes the Weasel". Chucky's revenge prank ends up inspiring Iron Weasel's new song. After getting unstuck, the band plays their new song "Get Away From Me" for Simon Craig, which just barely passes his liking test, allowing the band to continue their comeback. Enraged at his failure, Chucky swears vengeance on Iron Weasel, granting the band a new enemy. Iron Weasel song(s) featured: "Get Away From Me" Special guest star: Alan Thicke as Simon Craig Guest star: Zayne Emory as Charles Albertson Absent: Caitlyn Taylor Love as Izzy
27	6	"Burning Down the House"	Victor Gonzalez	Ron Rappaport	March 7, 2011	206
The house is burnt down after a party and Beth wants the band out of the house forever. However, it was Beth leaving her curling iron on that burned down the house. Tripp and the band eventually find out and pull a stunt making Beth think the band is leaving forever from feeling bad about burning down the house. Beth eventually confesses and they reconcile. Guest stars: Beth Littleford as Beth Campbell, John P. Farley as Fire Marshall Absent: Caitlyn Taylor Love as Izzy
28	7	"Who Dunnit?"	Victor Gonzalez	Steve Jarczak & Shawn Thomas	March 14, 2011	212
Simon Craig asks the band to temporarily move in with him while Tripp's house is being repaired. He also asks the band to babysit Charles while he is hosting a murder mystery party. Charles then goes missing and the band try to find him before Simon finds out. Izzy goes to Tripp's house and brings Charles back before Simon discovers he was missing. Special guest star: Alan Thicke as Simon Craig Guest star: Zayne Emory as Charles Albertson
29	8	"Yo, Check My House"	Steve Zuckerman	Eric Friedman	March 21, 2011	218
Tripp's house is finally repaired and the gang moves back in. when Beth is out of town for the weekend, the band buys new furniture for the house, including video games and a ball pit, but Tripp signs a contract with the TV show "Yo, Check My House" and if their home isn't cool enough, it will get wrecked. In the meantime, Iron Weasel are trying to hide Beth so she doesn't embarrass them on TV and cost them the house. It is cool until the crew realize they live with Tripp's mom and wreck the house. Guest stars: Beth Littleford as Beth Campbell, Preston Jones as Kurt Dirkman, James Hong as Leon Absent: Caitlyn Taylor Love as Izzy
30	9	"Grand Theft Weasel"	Steve Valentine	Ryan Levin	March 28, 2011	211
Tripp teaches the band a lesson about spending their advance money on frivolous things by hiding the money bag that they keep leaving around. Worried about the "missing" bag, the band tortures Charles (destroying his favorite toy and tickling him on their tickle table), thinking that he is responsible for stealing it. The band overhears Tripp talking about hiding it, so they take it and hide it. Tripp then tortures Chucky, thinking he did it. After he is untied, Chucky really does take the bag. They later realize that the bag that Chucky took was just a sandwich. Special guest star: Alan Thicke as Simon Craig Guest star: Zayne Emory as Charles Albertson Note: Derek's actor, Steve Valentine, directs this episode.
31	10	"Don't Date the Principal's Daughter"	Paul Lazarus	Eric Friedman	April 4, 2011	207
Tripp falls for Gia, a girl at his school, then realizes that she is Principal Jenkins' daughter. The band then arranges for Beth to date Principal Jenkins so that Tripp has the opportunity to date Gia. Gia shows up at his house while her father is there because she likes danger. They tell many lies and all is well until Beth's date shows up, causing all the lies to be revealed. Guest stars: Beth Littleford as Beth Campbell, Mark Teich as Principal Jenkins, Lauran Irion as Gia, J. Paul Boehmer as Bill Absent: Caitlyn Taylor Love as Izzy Notes: This is the first appearance of Principal Jenkins. This is also the last appearance of Beth Campbell.
32	11	"Weasels on a Plane"	Shelley Jensen	Ryan Levin	June 13, 2011	215
Simon Craig lends Iron Weasel his private jet to perform at a concert in New York. The band then gets on the wrong plane flown by a student pilot. Fearing for their lives, they reveal their darkest secrets to each other which breaks their friendship. To get back together, Ash rents another plane, and Iron Weasel make up and crash land it again, finally settling their problems and repairing their friendship. Iron Weasel song(s) featured: "I Wanna Punch Stuff", "Get Away From Me" Guest stars: Brian Michael Jones as Sherman, William Christian as Pilot Absent: Caitlyn Taylor Love as Izzy
33	12	"Lord of the Weasels"	Victor Gonzalez	Steve Jarczak & Shawn Thomas	June 20, 2011	220
Derek gets upset when Burger and Ash listen to Tripp over him, and Tripp sells the band van to one of Burger's friends who is into live action role-playing. When Iron Weasel retrieve the van from the group and Derek is named the new king, he quits the band to try his hand at the lifestyle. But his new power goes to his head and Tripp defeats him in order to get him back in the band. Iron Weasel song(s) featured: "Band Van" Guest stars: Zach Callison as Billy, Lou Saliba as Jeff Note: Lord of the Weasels is a parody of "Lord of the Rings"
34	13	"Weaselgate"	Sean Mulcahy	Rick Nyholm	June 27, 2011	208
Izzy wants to be president of her school, but has to beat Bryce Johnson, the most popular guy in school. So Tripp enters the election, causing Bryce to pull a prank and gets him disqualified. He then pulls a prank on Bryce, leaving Izzy the only one left. Guest stars: Mark Teich as Principal Jenkins, Spencer Boldman as Bryce Johnson, Shawn Harrison as Game Show Host Notes: This episode premiered in Disney XD Latin America on March 29, 2011. Also, there are several references to Steve Valentine's (Derek) earlier characters, Nigel (from Crossing Jordan) and Alistair (from Dragon Age), when he talks about his uncles.
35	14	"Prank Week 2"	Victor Gonzalez	Ron Rappaport	August 1, 2011	219
During the next Prank Week, the guys try to get revenge on Tripp for how he pranked them the last time. Burger wants to help, but Ash and Derek forbid him from helping due to him folding under pressure, Tripp and Burger team up to prank Ash and Derek, but they accidentally prank Principal Jenkins and he expels Tripp. To prevent Tripp's mom from finding out, Burger ties up and kidnaps Jenkins, but it turns out that it was all a prank by Burger and Jenkins. Guest star: Mark Teich as Principal Jenkins
36	15	"Pain Games"	Eric Dean Seaton	Rick Nyholm	August 8, 2011	214
Izzy is in danger of being replaced as school president unless she gets a rock band to perform at the school dance. Izzy tries to enlist Iron Weasel to help her out, but they've booked a gig at the famous Greek theater the same night. They find out that their rivals Metal Wolf, along with Bryce Johnson, Tripp's enemy, will play in their absence. Iron Weasel, not wanting to lose any performance to them, challenges Metal Wolf to the Pain Games, where each band devises painful tests for the other to endure, and the winner will get to play the school dance. Iron Weasel wins and Metal Wolf steals their gig. As revenge, the band dumps cactus on them and Tripp steals Bryce's girlfriend, Gia. Guest stars: Mark Gagliardi as Savage, Randy Sklar as Blaze, Jason Sklar as Claw, Spencer Boldman as Bryce Johnson, Lauran Irion as Gia Note: This is the last appearance of Bryce Johnson and Gia.
37	16	"Iron Weasel Gets Schooled"	Shelley Jensen	Regina Hicks	August 15, 2011	216
Iron Weasel is honored to participate in a "Stay In School" PSA, but are made to look like fools in the final broadcast version. Tripp convinces the dejected trio to go back to school to earn their high school diplomas. Feeling defeated after failing their first class, they're about to give up, until Tripp decides to help Iron Weasel in a way they will learn. He throws away Derek's tea to teach him about war, hooks Burger up with a hot girl to teach him about poetry, and makes Ash fall off of a ladder to teach him about gravity. In the end, Iron Weasel receives their high school diplomas, and star in a commercial for "Grilk". Guest stars: Mark Teich as Principal Jenkins, Reginald VelJohnson as Superintendent Strickland, Valorie Hubbard as Mrs. Landolt Note: This is the last appearance of Superintendent Strickland.
38	17	"Kicked Out for Band Behavior"	Shelley Jensen	Michael B. Kaplan & Ron Rappaport	September 26, 2011	217
In this clip show of the series, when Principal Jenkins hears that the band is Tripp's guardian until Beth comes back from overseas, he sends a government official to inspect them and see if they are legal guardians. Iron Weasel teaches the official to have fun and are declared fit guardians. Guest stars: Mark Teich as Principal Jenkins, Mary K. DeVault as Vivian Dumont Note: This is the last appearance of Principal Jenkins.
39	18	"Iron Weasel vs. Mini Weasel"	Victor Gonzalez	David Shayne	October 3, 2011	221
Iron Weasel try to prove they are still edgy rockers after a magazine article claims they have gone soft. A cover band called Mini Weasel get into a fight with them and beat them up. When Iron Weasel get into a pretend fight with Mini Weasel, a fake cover band called Mega Weasel get into a fight with them and kick Mini Weasel off the stage, and then Iron Weasel kicks Mega Weasel off the stage and then play their new song with Mini Weasel. Iron Weasel song(s) featured: "Kick a Little Butt" Guest stars: Kevin Thompson as Mini Derek, David Mattey as Mega Derek, Mark Munoz as Mini Ash, Jeff Hatch as Mega Ash, Dana Michael Woods as Mini Burger, Troy Brenna as Mega Burger Joseph S. Griffo as Mini Tripp, Justin Lopez as Mega Tripp
40	19	"Trippnotized"	Shelley Jensen	Richard Gurman	December 7, 2011	213
Iron Weasel finally gets their break when Simon Craig decides to release their new comeback album but are surprised to learn he is also signing up with their arch-rival band, Metal Wolf. Tripp and the band devise a plan to get Simon to drop their rivals from his label – through hypnosis, but the idea backfires when they accidentally hypnotize themselves. Iron Weasel song(s) featured: "Back in Your Face" Special guest star: Alan Thicke as Simon Craig Guest stars: Mark Gagliardi as Savage, Randy Sklar as Blaze, Jason Sklar as Claw, Anjali Bhimani as Tasha Bell Note: This is the last appearance of Izzy, Simon Craig and Metal Wolf.
41	20	"Raiders of the Lost Dad"	Victor Gonzalez	Michael B. Kaplan	December 9, 2011	222
Tripp's globe-trotting archeologist father, Jack, returns to bond with Tripp after being away for several years, but things quickly go awry when a famous treasure thief kidnaps Ash, releasing him only in exchange for a valuable artifact. Then, Tripp, Derek, Burger, and Jack go on a rugged adventure to rescue Ash. In the end, Jack defeats the Villain and Ash is rescued. Iron Weasel song(s) featured: "We Are Awesome" Guest stars: James Patrick Stuart as Jack Campbell, Suzanne Cryer as Dominique Duvalier, Alex Frnka as Monique Duvalier Absent: Caitlyn Taylor Love as Izzy Note: This is the series finale due to the show's cancellation.
