= Crackle (service) =

Defunct American video streaming service

- Final logo from 2019 to 2024
- Formerly: Grouper (2004–2007); Sony Crackle (2018–2019)
- Type: Subsidiary
- Industry: Entertainment
- Founded: 2004; 22 years ago
- Founders: Josh Felser; Dave Samuel; Mike Sitrin; Aviv Eyal
- Defunct: July 10, 2024; 2 years ago
- Fate: Chapter 7 bankruptcy liquidation by parent company
- Headquarters: Culver City, California, United States
- Area served: United States
- Services: Digital streaming
- Members: 40 million monthly active users (as of December 31, 2021)
- Parent: Chicken Soup for the Soul Entertainment

Crackle was an American-based video streaming service. It was founded in 2004 as Grouper, before the service was purchased by Sony Pictures in 2006 and renamed Crackle. In 2018, the name was changed to Sony Crackle. Sony sold a majority stake to Chicken Soup for the Soul Entertainment in March 2019, and the name was changed back to Crackle. In July 2024, Chicken Soup for the Soul Entertainment was placed in Chapter 7 liquidation, which entailed a liquidation of the company's assets and the cessation of its subsidiaries, including Crackle; while all other subsidiaries were closed, the Chapter 7 trustee kept the Crackle website operating for the United States until June 2025.

== History ==
Grouper Networks, an encrypted P2P network that integrates file sharing, instant messaging, and multimedia streaming, was founded in 2004 by Josh Felser, Dave Samuel, Mike Sitrin, and Aviv Aiyal. Sony purchased it in August 2006 for $65 million. In July 2007, Sony rebranded Grouper as Crackle, a multi-platform video-entertainment network and studio, and in late 2008 appointed Eric Berger as general manager.

In March 2011, Crackle launched its streaming services on Bravia TVs, the PlayStation 3, Roku boxes, and Sony Blu-ray players. It also partnered with Xbox Live and added its content to Xbox 360.

In January 2012, Crackle added Animax to its content for users in the US and Canada, and later by the end of March 2013, Animax branding was removed.

In June 2013, it released an app for the BlackBerry 10 platform and added its content to the Apple TV set-top box.

Logo used from 2008 to 2018

On April 1, 2014, Sony Pictures Television ceased its Crackle operations in the UK In Australia, Crackle became the free-to-air home of Sony's popular American soap opera Days of Our Lives. The same month, Crackle announced the creation of Sports Jeopardy!, a sports-themed version of the game show Jeopardy! hosted by Dan Patrick.

On April 14, 2015, Crackle announced a new feature called "Always On"; an ad-supported, internet television channel similar to Vevo TV. Crackle also announced its first animated series, SuperMansion; their first hour-long scripted drama, The Art of More; and Joe Dirt 2: Beautiful Loser, a sequel to 2001's Joe Dirt. On October 8, 2015, Crackle premiered SuperMansion, a stop-motion animated comedy television series created by Matthew Senreich and Zeb Wells. The series stars the voices of Bryan Cranston, Heidi Gardner, Tucker Gilmore, Keegan-Michael Key, Tom Root, Yvette Nicole Brown, Wells, and Jillian Bell.

In 2017, Crackle announced the platform had greenlit an original drama, The Oath, written and created by former Los Angeles County Sheriff's deputy Joe Halpin. Executive produced by Curtis "50 Cent" Jackson and his G-Unit Film & Television Inc., the drama series stars Sean Bean, Ryan Kwanten, Cory Hardrict, Arlen Escarpeta, Katrina Law, and J.J. Soria, and premiered on March 8, 2018.

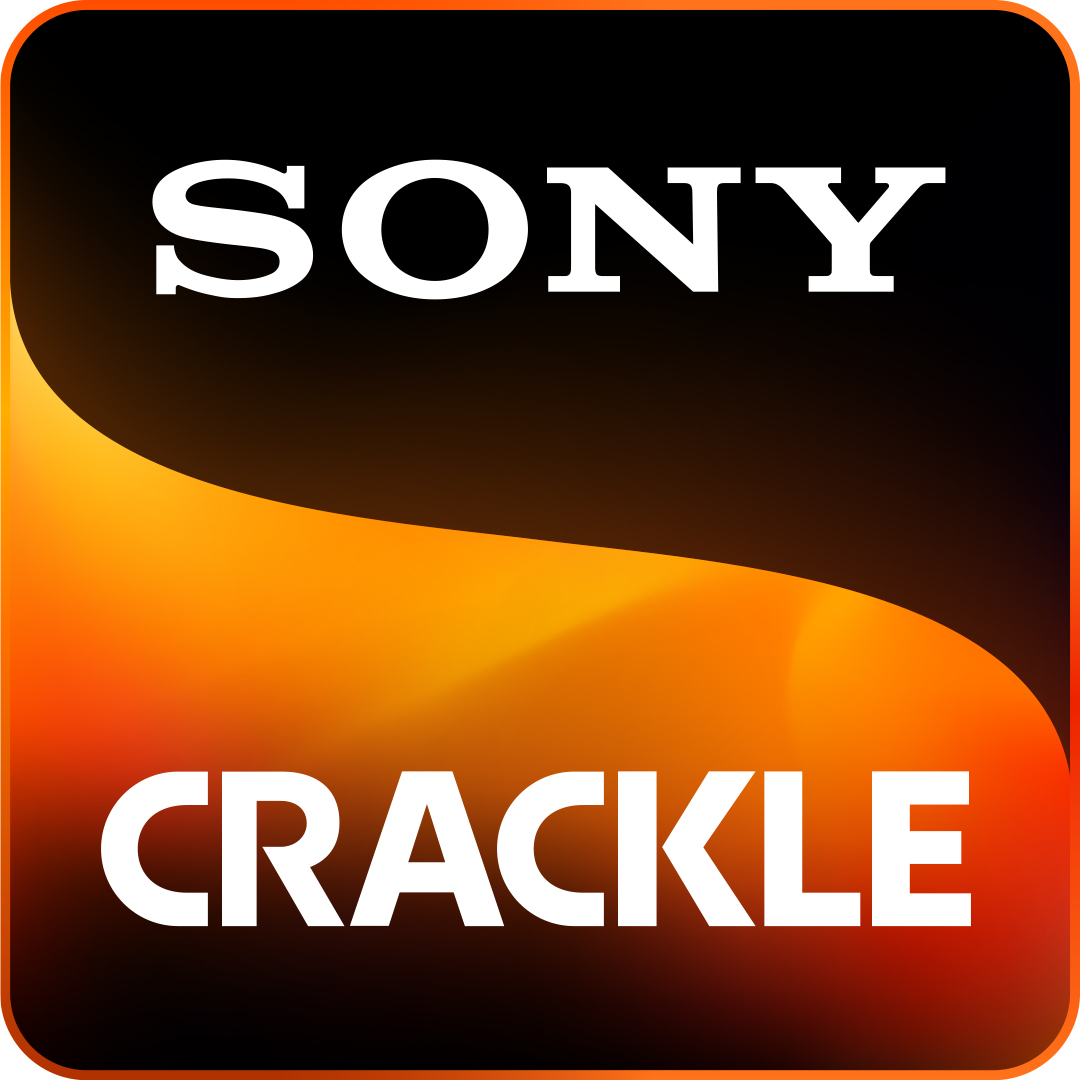
Sony Crackle logo used from 2018 to 2019

In spring 2018, the company's name was changed to Sony Crackle. In March 2019, Sony sold its majority stake in Sony Crackle to Chicken Soup for the Soul Entertainment (who owned its rival service Popcornflix via their Screen Media division), and the name was changed to Crackle again. Subsequently, on December 15, 2020, Sony sold its remaining stake in Crackle, giving full control to Chicken Soup for the Soul Entertainment.

In April 2023, Chicken Soup for the Soul Entertainment announced Crackle Connex, its advertising sales division, allowing advertisers to measure and track performance of advertisements on the platform.

On April 23, 2024, Chicken Soup for the Soul Entertainment announced a $636.6 million loss in 2023, and warned that without any options to generate additional financing, the company may be forced to liquidate or pause operations, and seek a potential Chapter 11 bankruptcy protection filing.

On June 29, 2024, the company filed for Chapter 11 bankruptcy protection after missing a week of paying its employees and failing to secure financing.

On July 10, 2024, the U.S. Bankruptcy Court approved a conversion of the bankruptcy to Chapter 7, which would signal a liquidation of the company's assets, and the cessation of its subsidiaries, including Crackle, but their YouTube channel alongside Popcornflix, remained active.

== Programming ==
=== Movie and TV library ===
Crackle featured films and TV shows, some exclusive, mainly from Sony Pictures and its subsidiaries, including Columbia Pictures, TriStar Pictures, Screen Gems, Sony Pictures Classics, and Sony Pictures Worldwide Acquisitions. Other Crackle Plus VOD platforms included Popcornflix (AVOD), Truli, and Pivotshare (SVOD platform).

Crackle also featured the "Crackle Original" series, including On the Ropes, Going from Broke, Hidden Heroes, The Oath, and Snatch. Crackle's content changed each month as titles were added and taken down.

=== Content providers ===
- A24
- A&E Networks
- BBC Studios
- CBS Media Ventures
- Cineville
- Discotek Media
- Disney-ABC Domestic Television
- Entertainment One
- Epic Pictures
- FilmRise
- Fremantle
- Gaumont
- Hallmark Entertainment
- Lionsgate
- Magnolia Pictures
- MarVista Entertainment
- Metro-Goldwyn-Mayer
- NBCUniversal Syndication Studios
- Nordisk Film
- Oscilloscope Laboratories
- Samuel Goldwyn Films
- Screen Media Ventures
- Shout! Factory
- Sony Pictures
- STX Entertainment
- Tribeca Film
- Universal Pictures
- Warner Bros.
- Walt Disney Studios Motion Pictures

== Availability ==
While it was Sony Crackle, it was available in 21 countries and in three languages: English, Portuguese, and Spanish. Crackle was launched in Canada in September 2010. In late 2015, several of the service's original series were made available only through the local services Crave TV and Shomi.

Crackle's Canadian operations were shut down on June 28, 2018, and its content was moved to Bell Media's CTV Movies and CTV Throwback services. Despite Crackle being a Sony owned service, the successor CTV app has not launched on Sony's PlayStation or Smart TV platforms, although it has become available on Microsoft's Xbox One console and Samsung's Smart TVs.

As of late 2016, Crackle in Latin America was available only as an ad-free paid service. Subscribers were required to have a pay-TV service provider that had partnered with Sony Crackle in order to access the service. Crackle was discontinued in Latin America on April 30, 2019.

== See also ==
- List of streaming media services
- Video on demand
