= Barbara Halloran Gibbons =

American columnist and satirical cookbook author (1934-2014)

Barbara Halloran Gibbons (1934 - March 26, 2014) was an American cookbook author and columnist. Known as "the Slim Gourmet," her syndicated column of the same name was widely distributed in the 1970s, and popularized her ideas on diet cooking. A number of her columns were humorous developments of her theory that "ingredients have no calories."

== Personal ==
Gibbons lived in New Jersey, California and Texas.

== Career ==
Gibbons was best known in the 1970s due to her syndicated "The Slim Gourmet" cooking column and the publication of many of her cookbooks on diet-focused cooking. Her publishing history continued into the 1980s.

== Humor ==
The ideas from Gibbons's humorous columns were collected in her 1982 book Calories Don't Count If You Eat Standing Up.

Since then, Gibbons's ideas developing her humorous theory that "ingredients have no calories" have been widely reproduced and distributed online, in private emails, and in the 1995 book Chicken Soup for the Soul Cookbook. People give these encapsulations of her ideas such titles as "Calories That Don't Count," "Food With No Calories," "The No-Fail Diet Plan" or "Guide To Calorie Burning." Usually, authorship is simply noted as "Source Unknown" or "Author Unknown."

The following are some of the foods which Gibbons says have no calories:

- Other people's food.
- Food on foot.
- Children's food.
- Uneven edges.
- TV food.
- Anything smaller than one inch.
- Left-handed food.
- Celebratory food.
- Food on toothpicks.
- Leftovers.
- Food eaten quickly.
- Custom-made food.

== Bibliography ==
- Gibbons, Barbara Halloran. Calories Don't Count If You Eat Standing Up. Chicago: Contemporary Books, Inc., 1982.
- Gibbons, Barbara Halloran. Diet Cookbook: Your Guide To Calorie-Wise Gourmet Cooking." Skokie, Il.: Publications International, c.1975.
- Gibbons, Barbara Halloran. Diet Watchers Cookbook. New York: Harper & Row, c.1978.
- Gibbons, Barbara Halloran. The International Slim Gourmet Cookbook. New York: Harper & Row, c.1978.
- Gibbons, Barbara Halloran. Lean Cuisine: Delicious Recipes For the Healthy Stay-Slender Life. New York: Harper & Row, c.1979.
- Gibbons, Barbara Halloran. Light and Easy Cookbook. New York: Macmillan, c. 1980.
- Gibbons, Barbara Halloran. Light & Spicy. New York: Harper & Row, c.1989.
- Gibbons, Barbara Halloran. The Potato Lover's Diet Cookbook. Denver: National Potato Promotion Board, c.1973.
- Gibbons, Barbara Halloran. Salads For All Seasons. New York: Macmillan, c.1982.
- Gibbons, Barbara Halloran. The Slim Gourmet Cookbook. New York: Harper & Row, c.1976.
- Gibbons, Barbara Halloran. Slim Gourmet Sweets and Treats. New York: Harper & Row, c.1982.
- Gibbons, Barbara Halloran. The Year-round Turkey Cookbook: Guide To Delicious, Nutritious Dining With Today's Versatile Turkey Products. New York: McGraw-Hill, c.1980.
- Spodnik, Jean Perry, and Barbara Halloran Gibbons. The 35-plus Diet For Women: The Breakthrough Metabolism Diet Developed at Kaiser Permanente For Women Over 35. New York: Harper & Row, c. 1987.
