= Chicken Soup for the Parent's Soul =

2000 book on parenting

Chicken Soup for the Parent's soul
- Cover page
- Language: English
- Publication date: September 14, 2000
- Media type: Print hardback, paperback
- ISBN: 1558747486 ( hardcover)

Chicken Soup for the Parent's Soul was the first book in the Chicken Soup for the Soul series to specifically address parenting. The stories, organized by topics such as “Insights and Lessons” and “Across Generations,” were compiled over a three-year period.

The book, originally published on September 14, 2000, spent twelve weeks on the New York Times Best Seller list, three of those in the top ten. During the first six months of its release alone, it sold 452,305 copies. In 2004, the Spanish language edition was published.

== See also ==
- List of Chicken Soup for the Soul books
