= Eric Berger =

Eric Berger may refer to:

- Eric Berger (journalist) (born 1973), American journalist and meteorologist
- Eric Berger (media executive), American media executive, founder of Common Sense Networks
- Eric Berger, character in American Desi
- Éric Berger (born 1969), French actor
