= Senior Moment =

- Poster
- Directed by: Giorgio Serafini
- Written by: Kurt Brungardt; Christopher Momenee
- Produced by: Gina G. Goff
- Starring: William Shatner; Jean Smart; Christopher Lloyd
- Cinematography: Marco Cappetta
- Edited by: Colleen Halsey
- Music by: Laura Karpman
- Production company: Goff Productions
- Distributed by: Chicken Soup for the Soul Entertainment; Screen Media Films
- Release date: March 26, 2021
- Country: United States
- Language: English

Senior Moment is a 2021 American romantic comedy-drama film directed by Giorgio Serafini and starring William Shatner, Jean Smart and Christopher Lloyd.

It was released on March 26, 2021, by Chicken Soup for the Soul Entertainment and Screen Media Films.

== Plot ==
Victor Martin is a retired Air Force pilot and lifelong bachelor who relives his youth cruising in his mint condition, silver, 1955 Porsche 356, usually accompanied by his best friend, retired jeweler Sal Spinelli. Victor and Sal encounter Pablo Torres, driving a vintage Chevrolet Impala lowrider and challenge him to a friendly drag race. However, Pablo is aware that there is a cop hiding ahead, and proceeds within the speed limit, letting Victor get pulled over. The police officer recognizes Victor as a well known character in the community and lets him off with a stern warning.

On a subsequent evening, Victor and Sal encounter Pablo again and actually drag race. Victor loses control and spins out and is charged with reckless driving. His license is revoked and his Porsche impounded as a result.

Forced to ride the bus, Victor meets Caroline Summers who owns an organic cafe called the "Cuckoo Cafe" and heads a grassroots organization to save the endangered desert tortoise. Victor particularly wins her heart when he and Sal, using Sal's expertise as a jeweler, repair a 19th century cuckoo clock, a family heirloom of Caroline's, which had not functioned for years, but for which her Cafe is named.

Victor's relationship with Caroline is not without rough patches. Victor's worst faux-pas is accusing Caroline of having an affair with Diego Lozana, a successful painter. It turns out that Caroline spends a lot of time with him because he is the main benefactor of her charity to save the tortoise, and she has commissioned him to paint a partially nude portrait of her (which resulted in Victor seeing her in a state of undress in his presence). It turns out that Diego is gay and happily married to a man. Victor must humbly apologize to Caroline.

Victor, twice, believes he sees his Porsche being driven in the area, and with the help of Pablo, who has befriended him and feels somewhat responsible for Victor losing his car and license, catches the private security guard at the impound lot illegally renting it out. The excitement and anger of this discovery cause Victor to have a heart attack and Pablo drives him to the hospital in the Porsche. Theft charges for taking the Porsche from the impound lot are dropped due to the emergency of the heart attack.

Eventually, Victor passes the necessary written and behind the wheel tests to get his driver's license reinstated. He sells his Porsche to Pablo for far below its value as thanks for saving his life, and buys a BMW i8 to replace it, and Sal is seen cruising in Pablo's lowrider, apparently having bought it.

Through their relationship, Victor develops a passion for saving the desert tortoise, and Caroline develops a guilty pleasure of riding in fast cars, despite her environmentalist leanings.

== Cast ==
- William Shatner as Victor Martin - A retired pilot and sports car enthusiast.
- Jean Smart as Caroline Summers - Environmentalist who runs an organization to save the desert tortoise and owns an organic cafe. Victor meets her when forced to ride the bus, and they begin a romantic relationship.
- Christopher Lloyd as Sal Spinelli - Victor's best friend. A retired jeweler.
- Esai Morales as Diego Lozana - A successful artist and primary benefactor of Caroline's charity. Victor falsely believes at one point that Caroline is having an affair with him.
- Don McManus as Rock Kendall - A sleazy attorney who Victor hires to help get his Driver's License back.
- Carlos Miranda as Pablo Torres - Victor's street racing rival and, later, good friend.
- Maya Stojan as Caroline's daughter Sonia, who works in the cafe.
- Beth Littleford as Assistant DA Tess Woodson - She prosecutes Victor for reckless driving. Victor learns that she has unfairly made the driving test considerably more difficult than it used to be.
- Katrina Bowden as Kristen - A model who has posed with Victor's car in car magazine spreads. She and Victor share a close but innocent platonic friendship.
- Ephraim Lopez as Steve - Victor's neighbor that he gets to know and becomes friends with when his lifestyle is forced to slow down when he loses his driver's license.
- Kaye Ballard as Maria.
- Denise DuBarry as a golfer.
- Kal Smith as Timmy
- Joe Estevez as Danny, a friend of Victor.

== Production ==
Shatner was cast in the film in March 2017. Lloyd was cast in April 2017. Smart and Lopez were cast in May 2017.

The film was shot in Palm Springs, California in 2017.

== Release ==
In January 2021, Screen Media Films acquired worldwide distribution rights to the film, which was released in theaters and on demand in March 2021.

== Reception ==
On Rotten Tomatoes, the film has a 21% approval rating from critics based on 19 reviews, with an average rating of 4.2/10. On Metacritic, it has a weighted average score of 41 out of 100, based on reviews from 5 critics, indicating "mixed or average reviews".

Glenn Kenny of The New York Times wrote: "This is the kind of movie that is usually defended with one word: 'harmless'." Richard Roeper of the Chicago Sun-Times gave it 2 out of 4 stars and wrote: "Built of sitcom-style hijinks and pretty light on those, it's barely a movie..."
