= Carol Saline =

American journalist (1939–2025)

- Born: Carol Sue Auerbach; May 17, 1939; Philadelphia, Pennsylvania, U.S.
- Died: August 30, 2025 (aged 86); Philadelphia, Pennsylvania, U.S.
- Education: Syracuse University (BA)
- Occupations: Journalist; broadcaster
- Spouses: Jack Saline (divorced); Paul Rathblott (m. 2005)
- Children: 2

Carol Saline (née Auerbach; May 17, 1939 – August 30, 2025) was an American journalist, broadcaster, author and public speaker.

== Background ==
Saline was born Carol Sue Auerbach in Philadelphia on May 17, 1939, though for many years she had believed her birthday was May 19. She was raised in Camden, New Jersey. A graduate of Syracuse University, Saline held a dual degree in English and Journalism. While in school, she was a member of Sigma Delta Tau sorority.

She had two children with her first husband, Jack Saline, and resided in Philadelphia with her second husband, Paul Rathblott.

Saline died from acute myeloid leukemia at her home, on August 30, 2025, at the age of 86. In the months before her death, she began speaking with journalists at The New York Times and The Philadelphia Inquirer, disclosing that she was terminally ill and helping prepare obituaries.

== Career ==
Saline wrote eight books. They include Dr. Snow: How the FBI Nailed an Ivy League Coke King, Straight Talk: How to Get Closer to Others by Saying What You Really Mean, and A Guide to Good Health.

She collaborated with photographer Sharon Wohlmuth on five photo-essay books. Their most popular, Sisters, spent 63 weeks on the New York Times bestseller list and sold over one million copies. It was followed by Mothers & Daughters, which hit No. 1 on every national best-seller list. A third bestseller, Best Friends, completed this trilogy. A fourth book, Sisters: 10th Anniversary Edition, came out in October 2004. A day in the life of the American Woman, was published in October 2005.

Saline worked as a senior writer at Philadelphia Magazine for more than three decades, where she specialized in health, profiles, and investigative reporting. Her articles appeared in Reader’s Digest, Family Circle, More, Redbook, Self and Cosmo Girl.

Saline hosted The Fretz Kitchen, a daily cooking program on CN8. For nearly a decade, she appeared as a regular panelist on the Sunday public affairs program, Inside Story. Her national television appearances include The Oprah Winfrey Show, The Phil Donahue Show, Larry King Live, American Journal, Inside Edition, CBS Good Morning, The Weekend Today Show and Good Morning America.

She was a public speaker and moderator who gave lectures and workshops nationwide.

== Awards ==
=== Writing ===
- Two-time winner of the National Magazine Award
- Three Clarions for print feature writing from Women in Communications
- Charles Stuart Mott and The International Reading Association Awards for educational writing
- Health Journalism Award from the American Society of Chiropractors
- Four “Sarahs” from Women in Communications, which cited her as a “Super Communicator”

=== Social causes ===
- 1984 “Woman of Achievement,” the Delaware County Domestic Abuse Project
- 1987 “Woman of Achievement,” Women in Transition
- 1990 Myrtle Wreath Award by Camden County Hadassah
- 1995 “Woman of Achievement,” Melitta Benz
- 1996 “Woman of Achievement,” Montgomery County Woman's Center
