= I'm in the Band =

American teen sitcom

- The main characters of I'm in the Band (from the left to right), Burger, Derek, Tripp and Ash.
- Genre: Teen sitcom; Slapstick; Off-color
- Created by: Michael B. Kaplan & Ron Rappaport
- Starring: Logan Miller; Stephen Full; Greg Baker; Caitlyn Taylor Love; Steve Valentine
- Theme music composer: David Wilde; Karl Cochran; Michael B. Kaplan; Ron Rappaport; Stacy Wilde
- Opening theme: "Weasel Rock You" (short version), performed by Chuck Duran
- Ending theme: "Weasel Rock You" (short instrumental)
- Composers: Michael Corcoran; Eric Goldman; Zed Kelley
- Country of origin: United States
- Original language: English
- No. of seasons: 2
- No. of episodes: 41 (list of episodes)

Production
- Executive producers: Michael B. Kaplan; Ron Rappaport; Richard Gurman
- Producer: Walter Barnett
- Cinematography: Chris La Fountaine; Rick F. Gunter
- Editors: Larry Harris; Kelly Sandefur
- Camera setup: Videotape (filmized); Multi-camera
- Running time: 22 minutes
- Production company: It's a Laugh Productions

Original release
- Network: Disney XD
- Release: November 27, 2009 – December 9, 2011

I'm in the Band is an American teen sitcom created by Michael B. Kaplan and Ron Rappaport that originally aired on Disney XD in the United States and on Family Channel in Canada. The first episode was taped on July 14, 2009, with a "sneak preview" airing on November 27, 2009; the show subsequently joined Disney XD's regular schedule on January 18, 2010, with the first episode being shown as a "sneak preview" in the United Kingdom on that same date. The show's January 18, 2010 premiere was watched by an estimated 860,000 viewers. This was the first Disney XD Original Series from It's a Laugh Productions.

It was announced on April 26, 2010, that I'm in the Band had been renewed for a second season which premiered on January 17, 2011.

== Premise ==
A teenage boy becomes lead guitarist for his favorite washed up rock band trying to make a comeback. They let him be lead guitarist in exchange for letting them live in his house in the suburbs.

== Episodes ==
Season	Episodes	Originally released	
Season	Episodes	First released	Last released
1	21	November 27, 2009	November 8, 2010
2	20	January 17, 2011	December 9, 2011

== Characters ==
=== Main ===
- Logan Miller as Tripp Campbell
- Stephen Full as Ash
- Greg Baker as Burger Pitt
- Caitlyn Taylor Love as Izzy Fuentes
- Steve Valentine as Derek Jupiter

=== Supporting ===
- Beth Littleford as Beth Campbell
- Reginald VelJohnson as Principal (later Superintendent) Cornelius Strickland
- Aaron Albert as Jared
- Hollywood Yates as Ernesto the Besto
- Zayne Emory as Charles "Chucky" Albertson
- Jennifer Robertson as Sandra Montague
- Alan Thicke as Simon Craig
- Mark Teich as Principal Maurice Jenkin
- Spencer Boldman as Bryce Johnson

== Cancellation ==
On March 15, 2011, Caitlyn Taylor Love and Greg Baker announced on their official Twitter accounts that the second season would be the show's last. On April 28, 2011, Disney XD officially announced the show's cancellation, with the remaining season 2 episodes to air for the remainder of the year. The final produced episode, "Raiders of the Lost Dad", aired on December 9, 2011.

== Reception ==
=== Critical reception ===
Emily Ashby of Common Sense Media gave the show a mixed review. She stated that "while it's lighthearted, the show isn't exactly realistic when it comes to portraying adult responsibility," also noting that "there's no shortage of laughs in I'm in the Band."

=== Viewership ===
The series premiered to an estimated 863,000 viewers proving to be the network's highest-rated series premiere for a Disney XD Original Series, including the Toon Disney phase.
