= Sweatshop (film) =

- Directed by: Stacy Davidson
- Written by: Stacy Davidson; Ted Geoghegan
- Produced by: Laura Bryant; Ted Geoghegan
- Starring: Ashley Kay, Melanie Donihoo, Peyton Wetzel
- Cinematography: Stacy Davidson
- Edited by: Stacy Davidson
- Music by: Dwayne Cathey
- Production companies: Bloodline Entertainment; Odyssee Pictures; Starving Kappa Pictures; Upstart Filmworks
- Distributed by: Screen Media Films
- Release date: 2009
- Running time: 90 minutes
- Country: United States
- Language: English

Sweatshop is a 2009 American slasher film directed by Stacy Davidson and starring Ashley Kay, Melanie Donihoo, and Peyton Wetzel. It follows a group of early aged adults who are stalked and viciously murdered by a humongous welder with an equally massive sledgehammer and his two women followers after breaking into an abandoned factory to throw a rave in order to make profits off pimping out their friends.

== Plot ==
A young woman wakes up nude on the floor of a seemingly abandoned building, she is visibly petrified and begins to run away as she hears guttural noises. As she does so a security guard enters the building calling out for trespassers. He draws his gun as he hears the same guttural voices and accidentally shoots the scared woman as she runs toward him and she falls to the floor dead.

A group of friends pull up outside the same building, they break in and quickly begin searching around. They talk about using the building for an illegal rave and say they thought their friends Ghost and Brandi would already be inside. They quickly find an abandoned camera and watch it revealing the young woman from earlier to be Brandi and presume they are already busy setting up so the friends start setting up too.

The group soon split up with Charlie, Scotty and Kim setting up lighting and sound equipment. Another girl, Lolli investigates further into the building and begins to hear similar noises as earlier but finds Scotty's brother Wade and another friend Kenny sneaking around the building who scare her. The group soon gather again and Charlie who seems to be the leader proclaims they only have an hour until the party begins. Kim climbs a tall ladder to set up some lighting when she sees a ghoulish face in the darkness, she knocks some piping off the wall and scares everyone but doesn't mention the face as she believes she is just seeing things.

Wade and Lolli depart, she seduces him and they begin having sex. Miko and Jade have a disagreement when Jade claims she has feelings for Wade and Miko claims he is a slimeball. Miko leaves and soon after Jade is upset to find Wade and Lolli much to Lolli's delight. Jade flees and Lolli pushes Wade away. As she gets dressed, a ghoulish woman attacks Lolli and a humongous man dressed in welding gear and brandishing a huge hammer begins pulling out her intestines with his bare hands and rips off her jaw, killing her.

Jade rejoins the group and Charlie enquires where Lolli is. Kim offers to go look for her and is abducted by two feral women who drag her to the killer welder, who cuts off her fingers before breaking her spine with his hammer.

Jade, who is in charge of drinks poisons a bottle of beer planning on giving it to Wade but Kenny also grabs a beer. Wade is rude to Jade and Kenny punches him to defend her, knocking the beer on the floor. The two bond as they share a smoke when they are suddenly attacked by the feral women who decapitate Kenny and chase Jade who puts up a valiant fight but is ultimately killed when the monstrous welder chokes her and crushes her head with his hammer.

Meanwhile Scotty and Miko are getting drunk together and chugging beers when Miko drinks the poisoned beer, Scotty attempts to help her but they run into the welder, who immediately kills Miko by crushing her with his hammer and knocks out Scotty. Wade next finds Kim still alive and attempts to rape her but the welder turns up and stabs Wade in the chin before finally ending Kim's suffering by crushing her head.

The party begins but Charlie and Enyx search for their friends and find their cars destroyed, they find a severed penis and then Kim's mangled body before being chased by the ghoulish feral killers. They flee but Enyx is soon caught, stabbed in the throat and decapitated. Charlie finds Wade and Scotty bound to chairs at a table before being attacked by the welder, who crucifies Scotty.

Charlie manages to escape again and shoots the welder, she reaches the party which is in full swing. She begs for help but the party goers laugh at her until the welder turns up and starts killing indiscriminately, the metal shutter begins rolling down as Charlie manages to roll under and escape and the other party goers scream as the killer ends their lives.

After the credits Wade is seen still bound and gagged in the building begging for help.

== Critical response ==
Dread Central awarded 4/5, saying it managed to "create a fully immersive, cohesive mini-universe". Horror.com found it "effective and original" despite some longueurs and questionable acting. Horror Talk was more critical, awarding 1.5/5, criticizing the story and acting, and noting the low budget. The Film has a score of 22% on the popcornmeter (audience reviews) on Rotten Tomatoes.
