= Sharon Wohlmuth =

American photojournalist (1946–2022)

Sharon J. Wohlmuth (born Sharon J. Josolowitz; September 25, 1946 – February 12 or 13, 2022) was an American prize-winning photographer and co-author of 11 books. Wohlmuth earned her BFA in Photography from Moore College of Art & Design. She was the only photojournalist to make The New York Times bestsellers list three times. After being hired as the second woman photographer for The Philadelphia Inquirer Wohlmuth worked there for 20 years, winning multiple awards including the World Press Photo Competition Feature Award, the Sigma Delta Chi Best Feature Photograph, and was a Nieman Foundation for Journalism finalist at Harvard University. Wohlmuth was also on the Inquirer team which won a Pulitzer Prize for its coverage of the Three Mile Island disaster.

In 1994, Wohlmuth teamed up with essayist Carol Saline to produce the book Sisters which spent 63 weeks on The New York Times bestseller list. After the runaway success of her first book, Wohlmuth and Saline cooperated to produce two more books in the trilogy, Mothers & Daughters and Best Friends. Wohlmuth has also co-authored six books in the popular Chicken Soup for the Soul series, and, in 2004, released a new 10th anniversary edition of Sisters. Her most recent book was entitled A Day in the Life of the American Woman: How We See Ourselves.

Besides books, Wohlmuth's work has also appeared in national publications such as Life, Time, People, Glamour, Redbook, McCall's Good Housekeeping, Camera 35 and more. Her photographs were featured in the highly successful Hallmark Hall of Fame "To Us" national television advertising campaigns for several years. This was followed by another partnership with the company for a holiday-themed television commercial that Wohlmuth co-produced as well as photographed. Her national television appearances include interviews on The Oprah Winfrey Show, Good Morning America and CBS This Morning. Wohlmuth was married to former publishing mogul Lawrence Teacher.

Wohlmuth died at her home in Rittenhouse Square in Philadelphia on 12 or 13 February 2022 at the age of 75.
