= Method & Red =

2004 American television series

- Promotional poster
- Created by: Kell Cahoon; Method Man
- Starring: Method Man; Redman; Anna Maria Horsford; Beth Littleford; David Henrie; Jeremiah Birkett; Lahmard Tate; Peter Jacobson
- Country of origin: United States
- Original language: English
- No. of seasons: 1
- No. of episodes: 13

Production
- Camera setup: Single-camera
- Running time: 30 minutes
- Production companies: If I Can Productions; Method Man Enterprises; Background Action, Inc. Regency Television; 20th Century Fox Television

Original release
- Network: Fox
- Release: June 16 – September 15, 2004

Method & Red, sometimes written Meth and Red, is an American television sitcom that originally ran on Fox from June 16 to September 15, 2004. It starred hip hop recording artists Method Man & Redman, portraying fictionalized versions of themselves who move to a predominantly white upper-class suburb in New Jersey.

Fox cancelled the show with 4 of the 13 episodes remaining unaired after heated meetings with Method Man and Redman, who were not pleased with the show. The duo publicly criticized Fox several times after this.

Method Man criticized the series for having a laugh track and Fox doing a bad job on editing. He had wanted it to be in the vein of Arrested Development, of which he is a fan.

== Cast ==
- Method Man as himself
- Redman as himself
- Anna Maria Horsford as Dorothy
- Beth Littleford as Nancy Blaford
- David Henrie as Skyler Blaford
- Jeremiah Birkett as Dupree
- Lahmard Tate as Lil' Bit
- Peter Jacobson as Bill Blaford

== Episodes ==
No.	Title	Directed by	Written by	Original release date	Prod. code	Viewers (millions)
1	"Pilot"	Jeff Melman	Story by : Kell Cahoon & Method Man; Teleplay by : Kell Cahoon	June 16, 2004	11-04-178	8.27
Hip hop recording artists Method Man and Redman move into a predominantly white suburb in New Jersey (along with Method Man's mother Dorothea, and two friends Lil Bit and Dupree). When the pair violates neighborhood association rules from throwing a wild party and face eviction, they attempt to use kindness (and fruitcake) to endear themselves to their new neighbors. In particular, they meet their family neighbors the Blafords: Nancy (whom they call "Neighbor Lady" throughout the whole series instead of Nancy), her husband Bill and their son Skyler.
2	"The Article"	Lev L. Spiro	Carter Bays & Craig Thomas	June 23, 2004	11-04-101	6.26
Concerned that magazine writer Keith Debeetham (Dale Godboldo) will portray them as "soft" (which he previously did to 50 Cent) now that they live in the suburbs, Method and Red grill Keith every chance they get so that he knows that they are "still hood". At the same time, Meth and Red promised Skyler that they will appear at his birthday party and he tells everyone at his school. Lil Bit warns Meth and Red that they won't "look too hood, sitting there eating birthday cake, with a bunch of White suburban kids". On top of that, Keith Debeetham reveals one reason he gave 50 Cent a bad review is because he still lives with his mother. The pair have to find a way to 1. Not let Keith know that Dorthy is Meth's mom. 2. Attend Skyler's party. 3. Convince Keith that they have not changed since moving to the suburbs.
3	"Well Well Well"	Peter Lauer	Phil Lord and Christopher Miller	June 30, 2004	11-04-102	5.98
As Dorothea's 25th anniversary at work approaches, Redman promises to get Chaka Khan to perform at her party. Meanwhile, Nancy is blasting her Kenny Loggins music from her house which angers Meth because he has a personal grudge against Kenny. While setting up for the party, Meth and Red suck up all the power from the neighborhood for their own home. Nancy calls electric company agents and they shut Meth's and Red power off. Meth must find a way to get the power back on in time for his Mom's party. Singers Chaka Khan and Kenny Loggins appear as themselves.
4	"One Tree Hill"	Tamra Davis	Josh Bycel & Jonathan Fener	July 7, 2004	11-04-104	5.71
Dorthy is caring for a cherry tree of hers which she has kept since their old neighborhood, but Nancy tells her that there is a neighborhood law that states "exotics are prohibited" and that her tree will be cut down .Method and Red go to a personal lawyer and ask about the law to which there are told they could have changed the law a month ago when it was their turn to become Neighborhood Association Presidents (a rotating one month position that lets a homeowner do what they please). It is revealed that Nancy did not tell Meth and Red about it purposely because she does not want them to be presidents. Meth and Red gain the position anyway and soon become power hungry and perform many crazy activities and have several fun moments.....everything except changing the law concerning Dorthy's tree.
5	"Dogs"	Michael Lange	Ira Ungerleider	July 14, 2004	11-04-105	5.93
Method and Red seek to build a sports arena (the Methodome at the Redowlands) before NBA basketball star Yao Ming whom they are rivals with because Red caused Yao an injury in the past. Nancy's husband Bill is a businessman, so red asks him does he know any investors that can help pay for the $500 million stadium. Bill tells them of an investor named Carrie Norris (Carmen Electra). Dorothea forces Meth to have a talk with Skyler after the boy is unduly influenced by one of his music videos. Meth goes to Skyler's school and talks to the principal but ends up slapping her on the behind which causes everyone at the school to start doing it. Meth is now viewed as a negative influence across the nation. Meth and Red must now clear Meth's image and try to get the money for the stadium.
6	"Kill Bill Vol. 3"	Michael Spiller	Tom Saunders	July 21, 2004	11-04-106	5.86
Method and Red pit Nancy and Bill Blaford against each other as a part of a plan to use the Blafords' porch for their Miss Ghetto USA beauty pageant. Nancy immediately says no, but Bill says yes after Meth and Red go to him afterwards. Nancy gets furious with Bill for this and kicks him out, so he stays with Meth and Red. When the ladies arrive for the pageant, Bill suddenly starts to get on everyone's nerves (bugging Dorthy while she's watching a soap opera. throwing out Meth's marijuana, and stopping Red from getting any sexual action with the women). The guys must decide if they want to throw Bill out or keep him in the house until the pageant is over, but their patience is very low.
7	"Something About Brenda"	Michael Spiller	Teri Schaffer & Raynelle Swilling	July 28, 2004	11-04-103	5.13
Method Man falls hard for Brenda Biscoe (Elise Neal) Bill 's attractive co-worker and the mother of Skyler's love interest Morgan. She rejects him at first but starts to get attracted after he lies and says he hikes and goes to church (two of Brenda's hobbies). Red bets Meth that if he doesn't get with Brenda then he has to buy Red a new car. Meth eventually starts to fall for Brenda and vice versa, to the disgust of Nancy who knows Brenda as well. Red and Dorthy then conspire a plan to get rid of Brenda as Meth starts spending way more time with Brenda than with them two.
8	"Neighborhood Watch"	Victor Nelli, Jr.	Clarence Livingston	September 8, 2004	11-04-110	5.01
Lil Bit and Dupree invite the circus to Meth and Red's home without their permission. Meth orders them to get the circus away but suddenly a rash of burglaries strikes the neighborhood. Nancy forms a neighborhood watch and finds herself patrolling with Method Man. Red's addiction to video games weakens his eyesight and he spends most of his time sexually cuddling with his partner instead of looking for the burglar. Meth and Nancy end up bickering with each other when Meth and Red accuse Nancy's son Skylar of being the burglar. They both have to put their differences aside so that no more robberies would occur.
9	"Chu Chu's Redemption"	Dennis Dugan	Raynelle Swilling	September 15, 2004	11-04-109	3.94
Method and Red try to keep an old friend in prison (Charles Chesterfield Hillfont/Chu Chu) from finding out about his girlfriend Rose's new line of work. Chu Chu asked Meth and Red to look out for his girlfriend while he is locked up but both of them have forgotten about her for years. They invite her to stay at their house until Chu Chu gets out. Meanwhile, Dorthy forces the boys to help Skyler build a car for the soap box derby. Meth and Red try their best to avoid Skyler because they have been trying to get away from Skyler since meeting him and not spend time with him. Meth and Red bribe him with hundreds of dollars to leave them alone every time he comes over and asks for their help with the car. Now the boys have to take care of Rose and get Skyler to leave them alone.
10	"Da Shootout"	Michael Schultz	Kenny Buford	Unaired	11-04-107	N/A
Rival hip-hop artist Fear (Fredro Starr) moves into a better gated community and lures Method and Red's ace TV repairman away from them, so the duo challenges him to a neighborhood basketball game. NBA basketball players Devean George and Corey Maggette appears as themselves.
11	"How Momma Got Her Groove Back"	Peter Lauer	Raynelle Swilling	Unaired	11-04-108	N/A
Dorothea opens a hair salon in the game room. An expensive diamond necklace that Red borrowed from a German jeweler goes missing.
12	"A House Apart"	Peter Lauer	Phil Lord & Christopher Miller	Unaired	11-04-111	N/A
No longer able to stand Dorothea's constant nagging, Red buys his own mansion in Nottingshire Estates, just as Nancy tries to become "Real Estate Agent of the Year." Tommy Chong appears as himself.
13	"Methodome"	Michael Lange	Tom Saunders	Unaired	11-04-112	N/A
Method Man's theme park Methodome opens.
