= Halcyon Studios =

American entertainment company (1976–2024)

Halcyon Studios, LLC
- Formerly: Robert Halmi, Inc. (1979–1988); Qintex Entertainment (1988–1990); RHI Entertainment (1990–1994, 2005–2012); Hallmark Entertainment (1994–2005); Sonar Entertainment (2012–2021)
- Type: Subsidiary
- Industry: Entertainment
- Genre: Media company
- Founded: 1979; 47 years ago
- Founder: Robert Halmi
- Defunct: July 10, 2024; 2 years ago
- Fate: Chapter 7 bankruptcy liquidation by parent company
- Headquarters: Los Angeles, United States
- Number of locations: 5
- Key people: David Ellender (CEO); Scott Packman (EVP and CSO); Matt Loze (EVP, development and production); Andrea Gorfolova (family and factual entertainment president)
- Parent: Qintex (1986–1989); New Line Cinema (1990-1994); Hallmark Cards (1994–2005); Chicken Soup for the Soul Entertainment (2021–2024)
- Website: halcyonstudios.tv (defunct)

Halcyon Studios, LLC, formerly known as Sonar Entertainment, RHI Entertainment, Hallmark Entertainment, Qintex Entertainment, HRI Group and Robert Halmi Inc., was an American entertainment company specializing in the production and distribution of scripted television content, part of Chicken Soup for the Soul Entertainment. It was founded in 1979 by Robert Halmi Jr. and Robert Halmi Sr. (1924–2014) as Robert Halmi, Inc. The company used the direct-to-series model for TV series. In July 2024, Chicken Soup for the Soul Entertainment was placed in Chapter 7 liquidation, which would instigate the cessation of its subsidiaries, including Halcyon Studios.

== History ==
Robert Halmi Inc. was founded in 1979 by Robert Halmi Sr. In July 1986, Robert Halmi Jr. took over as president and chief operating officer from Halmi Sr., who became the company's chairman and chief executive.

From 1985 to 1988, RHI began a slowly-executed takeover of Hal Roach Studios, which gave the company North American rights to a majority of the Laurel & Hardy films and shorts, the home entertainment and theatrical rights to the portion of the Our Gang shorts that were not retained by MGM, and a majority of Hal Roach Studios’ feature films. Robert Halmi Inc. was then renamed as HRI Group.

Not too long after, HRI Group was taken over by the Australian financial services company Qintex (having joined the board of RHI when the merger with HRS was completed), and renamed Qintex Entertainment. However, Qintex quickly proved to be on the brink of financial collapse, with their bid for the assets of MGM/UA Entertainment Co. failing, and entered chapter 11 bankruptcy in November 1989; their American operations had previously failed to provide timely payments to MCA Television (which Qintex had partnered with to distribute The New Leave It to Beaver) the month prior. In 1990, Halmi re-purchased the assets of Qintex Entertainment for $40 million.

In 1990, independent film studio New Line Cinema acquired a 52% stake in the studio, which was renamed as RHI Entertainment; for a time, RHI productions and New Line films were distributed to television stations under the banner New Line Television Distribution.

In 1992, RHI Entertainment made a deal with Cabin Fever Entertainment to distribute its library on home video. The company then signed a deal with American Zoetrope around the mid 1990s to develop programs for television.

Hallmark Cards agreed to purchase RHI in April 1994. RHI had a 1,800 plus hours film library at that time. Hallmark Entertainment was then formed with RHI and Signboard Hill Productions, another Hallmark Cards subsidiary, becoming subsidiaries.

In the wake of the Hallmark purchase, RHI Entertainment execs Larry Strichman and George Stelzner left to start a new independent production company LGS Entertainment with a deal at Hallmark. The company had also signed a production deal with von Zerneck/Sertner Films in 1995. Hallmark sold the Filmation library and its rights to Entertainment Rights in March 2004.

In December 2005, Hallmark Cards sold off Hallmark Entertainment to an investor group led by Robert Halmi Jr., and it was renamed back to RHI Entertainment.

On June 17, 2008, the company announced it will begin trading on the NASDAQ under the ticker symbol "RHIE".

On December 10, 2010, RHI filed for Chapter 11 Bankruptcy. The company emerged from bankruptcy on March 29, 2011.

In March 2012, the company was renamed Sonar Entertainment. The name change stemmed from the Halmis leaving the company.

On April 9, 2021, Chicken Soup for the Soul Entertainment signed a definitive agreement to acquire Sonar's assets, which currently includes most of the Hal Roach Studios library, and other material previously released and/or produced by predecessor companies Qintex, RHI, Cabin Fever, and Hallmark.

On May 3, 2021, CSS announced it would launch Halcyon Television, a scripted television studio.

On March 27, 2023, Shout! Factory licensed digital distribution and streaming rights to 189 titles from Halcyon Studios.

On April 23, 2024, its parent Chicken Soup for the Soul Entertainment announced a $636.6 million loss in 2023, and warned that without any options to generate additional financing, the company may be forced to liquidate or pause operations, and seek a potential Chapter 11 bankruptcy protection filing. On June 29, 2024, the company filed for Chapter 11 bankruptcy protection after missing a week of paying its employees and failing to secure financing.

On July 10, 2024, a bankruptcy judge ordered to convert Chicken Soup for the Soul Entertainment's Chapter 11 bankruptcy into a Chapter 7 bankruptcy liquidation after accusing the company's previous CEO of misusing the business and failing to pay employees or support healthcare. With the Chapter 7 conversion, the company's assets will be liquidated, resulting in the cessation of its subsidiaries, including Halcyon Studios. Liquidation has not occurred yet as of April 2025.

== Notable works ==
As Qintex Entertainment, the company co-produced the miniseries Lonesome Dove for CBS.

As of December 2017, Sonar Entertainment's scripted series on-air, in production or slated to commence production included Mr. Mercedes, written by David E. Kelley, based on the novel by Stephen King, with Audience Network for DIRECTV and AT&T U-Verse; Seasons 1 and 2 of The Son, starring Pierce Brosnan for AMC; Seasons 1 and 2 of The Shannara Chronicles, for Spike; and Das Boot, an eight-part series based on the film, for Sky.
