= Eric Berger (media executive) =

American media executive

- Occupation: Chief executive officer of Common Sense Networks

Eric Berger is an American media executive. He co-founded and is the CEO of Common Sense Networks, the for-profit arm of Common Sense Media.

== Career ==
Berger joined Time Warner as a corporate vice president of strategic planning where he was responsible for wireless initiatives and the creation of business growth. In 2006, Berger joined Sony Pictures as a vice president of mobile entertainment and digital networks, running the mobile publishing and distribution business. In May 2008, he became the general manager of Crackle (formerly known as Grouper), Sony's ad-supported video streaming service.

In 2017, Berger was named Chief Digital Officer for Sony Pictures Television Networks, and in 2018, he became the head of Sony's Direct-To-Consumer Unit, which included oversight of Funimation, Crackle, Film1 OTT and Animax.

In 2020, Berger left Sony for Common Sense Media, where he co-founded Common Sense Networks and became its CEO. In December 2020, he launched Sensical TV, a free streaming service for children aged 2 to 10.

== Recognition ==
In 2015, Berger was named one of Variety's 30 Digital Entertainment Execs to Watch. In 2016, he was included in The Hollywood Reporter's Silicon Beach 25 list of Los Angeles digital players.
