= Beth Littleford =

American actress (born 1968)

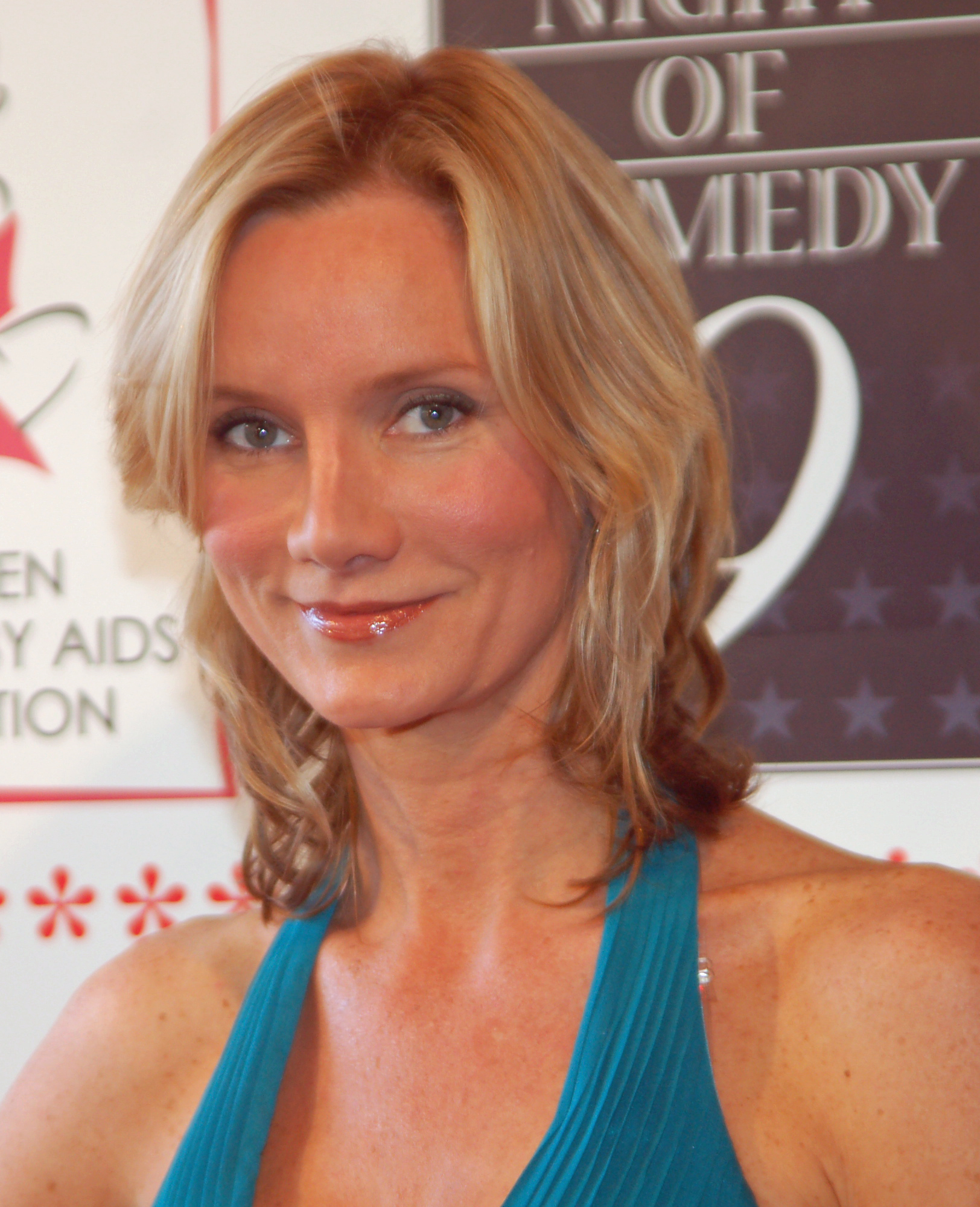
- Littleford at a charity event in Beverly Hills, California in 2011
- Born: July 17, 1968 (age 58); Nashville, Tennessee, U.S.
- Occupations: Actress; comedian
- Years active: 1996–present
- Spouse: Rob Fox (m. 1998; div. 2015)
- Children: 2 (Note: One biological child and one adopted child.)

Elizabeth Littleford (born July 17, 1968) is an American actress and comedian who was one of the original correspondents on Comedy Central's The Daily Show from 1996 to 2000. She was among the former correspondents recognized when The Daily Show with Jon Stewart received an institutional Peabody Award in 2015.

Outside of The Daily Show, Littleford acted on Spin City and played Nancy Blaford in the Fox sitcom Method & Red and Ellen Jennings in the Disney Channel series Dog with a Blog. Her film appearances include Mystery, Alaska, Crazy, Stupid, Love and Movie 43.

== Early life ==
Littleford was born in Nashville, Tennessee, the daughter of Jackie, a professor, and Philip O. Littleford, a cardiologist and inventor. She grew up in Winter Park, Florida and attended the Park Maitland School. Her father and brother died when she was sixteen in a pontoon plane accident during an Alaskan fishing trip. A National Merit Scholarship Program finalist in high school, she attended Swarthmore College in Pennsylvania for three years before taking up acting classes at New York University; she eventually graduated from The New School for Social Research.

== Career ==
Early in her acting career, Littleford worked with the improvisational theatre group Chicago City Limits. She wrote and performed a one-woman show, This Is Where I Get Off, at the Circle Repertory Company, and appeared in the romantic comedy Picture This.

Littleford joined The Daily Show in 1996 and stayed through the change from Craig Kilborn to Jon Stewart. Her celebrity interviews parodied Barbara Walters. In 1998, Comedy Central aired The Beth Littleford Interview Special, made up of interviews from the regular show.

While she was still on The Daily Show, Littleford began playing Deirdre West on Spin City. By 1999 she had also appeared in the film Mystery, Alaska. She was also among the celebrity participants listed for Austin's Big Stinkin' International Improv & Sketch Comedy Festival that year.

Littleford played Nancy Blaford in the 2004 Fox sitcom Method & Red. She went on to play Suzanne Berger in The Hard Times of RJ Berger and Ellen Jennings in the Disney Channel series Dog with a Blog. Her television work also included I'm in the Band, Desperate Housewives and several Ben 10 productions, including the television film Ben 10: Race Against Time.

In 2019, she appeared in the Dead to Me episode "I Can Handle It" on Netflix. In the 2021 film Senior Moment, she played Tess Woodson.

== Personal life ==
Littleford lives in Los Angeles. She was married to Rob Fox, a director and producer who worked alongside her on The Daily Show, from 1998 to 2015; they had a son (b. 2005) and an adopted daughter (b. 2012). Fox died in 2017.

== Filmography ==
=== Film ===
Year	Title	Role	Notes
1998	A Cool, Dry Place	Suzanne	
1999	The 24 Hour Woman	Lynn Shapiro	
1999	Mystery, Alaska	Janice Pettiboe	
1999	Picture This	Patty	
2008	Drillbit Taylor	Barbara Drennan	
2009	Veiled	Marie	Short
2011	Crazy, Stupid, Love	Claire	
2012	Music High	Lucy Bates	
2012	Kidnap Party	Alison Slater	
2013	It's Not You, It's Me	Sandy	
2013	Movie 43	Mrs. Cutler	
2017	Random Tropical Paradise	Martha Crandall	
2018	I'll Be Next Door for Christmas	Fran	Christmas comedy film written and directed by David Jay Willis
2021	Senior Moment	Tess Woodson	Feature Film - Released theatrically and on demand

=== Television ===
Year	Title	Role	Notes
1996–2000	The Daily Show	Herself	Original Female Correspondent
1998–2000	Spin City	Deirdre West	Recurring role
2001	Boston Public	Marcia Fennel	Episode: "Chapter 24"
2002	The West Wing	WKZN Philadelphia Anchor Leslie	Episode: "The U.S. Poet Laureate"
2002	Still Standing	Kristy Duncan	Episode: "Still in School"
2002	What I Like About You	Susan	Episode: "Copy That"
2002	Andy Richter Controls the Universe	Reggie Meadows	Episode: "The Show Might Go On"
2002–03	Greetings from Tucson	Marna	2 episodes
2002–03	Life with Bonnie	Dr. 'Mrs.' Casey	2 episodes
2003	The Big Wide World of Carl Laemke	Laurie Laemke	TV film
2003–04	One on One	Geraldine Murphy	Recurring role
2004	Method & Red	Nancy Blaford	Main role
2004	Frasier	Creationism Date	Episode: "Match Game" (season 11)
2005	Joey	Carla	Episode: "Joey and the Premiere"
2006	Rodney	Amy O'Brien	Episode: "Rodney Gets a Leg Up"
2006	Love, Inc.	Charlene	Episode: "Anything But Love"
2006–12	Family Guy	Various (voice)	Guest role
2007	Without a Trace	Diane Neese	Episode: "Two of Us"
2007	Ben 10: Race Against Time	Sandra Tennyson	TV film
2008	Samantha Who?	Audrey Rhodes	Episode: "The Girlfriend"
2008	Ben 10: Alien Force	Sandra Tennyson (voice)	Episode: "Grounded"
2009	Take 2	Amy	TV film
2009–10	Rules of Engagement	Laura	3 episodes
2009–11	I'm in the Band	Beth Campbell	Recurring role
2010	StarStruck	Barbara Olson	TV film
2010	CSI: Crime Scene Investigation	Nurse Mona	Episode: "Field Mice"
2010	Ben 10: Ultimate Alien	Sandra Tennyson (voice)	Episode: "Hit 'Em Where They Live"
2010	The New Adventures of Old Christine	Tony Kershaw	Episode: "Get Smarter"
2010	Neighbors from Hell	Various (voice)	Recurring role
2010	CSI: Miami	Elena Manus	Episode: "Sleepless in Miami"
2010–11	The Hard Times of RJ Berger	Suzanne Berger	Recurring role
2010–13	The Cleveland Show	Various (voice)	Guest role
2011	Desperate Housewives	Dana	2 episodes
2012	Melissa & Joey	Suzanne Haber	Episode: "Good to Go"
2012	Mad	Mother / "Who Wore it Better?" announcer / Tasha (voice)	1 episode
2012–15	Dog with a Blog	Ellen Jennings	Main role
2013	The Mindy Project	Helen	Episode: "Mindy's Minute"
2013–14	Ben 10: Omniverse	Sandra Tennyson	Voice, 3 episodes
2016	Mistresses	Lindsay Lehman	Episode: "Under Pressure"
2016	Unwanted Guest	Anna Roberts	TV film
2016–17	The Fosters	Realtor	3 episodes
2017	2 Broke Girls	Bonnie	Episode: "And the Stalking Dead"
2017	Liberty Crossing	Special Agent Margaret Smith	Episode: "Comfort Zones"
2018	My Dead Ex	Laurel	Recurring
2019	Dead to Me	Doug's Wife	Episode: "I Can Handle It"
2019	Home Is Where the Killer Is	Patricia Wade	TV film
2020–21	Love, Victor	Sarah	Hulu Original Series

=== Podcasts ===
Year	Title	Role	Notes
2018	Gossip	Rockin' Robin	12 episodes
