= Caitlyn Taylor Love =

American actress (born 1994)

- Born: June 16, 1994 (age 32); Corpus Christi, Texas, U.S.
- Occupations: Actress; musician; dancer
- Years active: 2006–2017

Caitlyn Taylor Love (born June 16, 1994) is a former American actress and musician. She co-starred in the Disney XD sitcom I'm in the Band. She was the voice of White Tiger/Ava Ayala in the Disney XD animated series Ultimate Spider-Man.

== Career ==
Caitlyn Taylor Love was born on June 16, 1994, in Corpus Christi, Texas, and raised in Harlingen, Texas. She began pursuing an interest in entertainment at age 10, by competing in the Miss Texas Pageant Talent Division. She would end up winning that division in 2004. She was then invited in July 2005 to compete at IMTA New York where she won Miss Jr. Actress of the Year along with several other acting and singing awards.

Love then moved to Los Angeles, California where she was briefly a cast member of MTV's Punk'd. She would achieve more notability by competing on NBC's America's Got Talent appearing as semi-finalist in the show's first season. In 2009, Love became a cast member of the Disney XD sitcom I'm in the Band.

Love has signed with Genuine Music Group and is preparing a master demo. It will be called Bad Case Of Love Disease which is a song on the album written by JakeAce Rivers.

In 2012, Love joined the recurring cast of Ultimate Spider-Man as White Tiger/Ava Alaya.

She has retired from acting in 2017.

== Filmography ==
Films
Year	Title	Role	Notes
2015	Tyler Perry's Madea's Tough Love	Wheels, Chris	Voice; recurring role

Television
Year	Title	Role	Notes
2006	America's Got Talent	Herself	Season 1 contestant; semi-finalist
2006	Punk'd	Herself	
2009–2011	I'm in the Band	Izzy Fuentes	Main role; 24 episodes
2012–2017	Ultimate Spider-Man	White Tiger/Ava Ayala	Voice; recurring role

Video Games
Year	Title	Role	Notes
2016	Lego Marvel Avengers	White Tiger/Ava Ayala	

== Awards and nominations ==
Year	Award	Category	Nominated work	Result
2012	Young Artist Awards	Best Performance in a TV series - Supporting Young Actress	I'm in the Band	Nominated

== Discography ==
Title	Release date
"Even If It Kills Me"	March 22, 2011
