= National Potato Promotion Board =

The National Potato Promotion Board is a federal government program that lives within the Agricultural Marketing Service of the United States Department of Agriculture.

== History ==
The board does business as Potatoes USA. It was established after the passage of the Potato Research and Promotion Act of 1971.

The program became effective on March 9, 1972.

In 2008, the National Chip Program was established "after chip potato farmers and processors requested a formal process to test and identify new varieties needed in the industry." As of 2026, there are 50 unique potato varieties used in the U.S. for chip production.
