= Chicken Soup for the Soul =

American self-help and consumer goods company

Chicken Soup for the Soul, LLC
- Type: Private
- Industry: Publishing; Licensing; Internet; Consumer packaged goods
- Founded: June 28, 1993; 33 years ago
- Founders: Jack Canfield and Mark Victor Hansen
- Headquarters: Cos Cob, Connecticut, U.S.
- Area served: Worldwide
- Key people: William J. Rouhana, Jr. (chairman & CEO); Amy Newmark (publisher)

Chicken Soup for the Soul, LLC is an American self-help and consumer goods company based in Cos Cob, Connecticut. It is known for the Chicken Soup for the Soul book series. The first book, like most subsequent titles in the series, consisted of inspirational stories about ordinary people's lives. The books are widely varied, each with a different theme.

The company has branched out into other categories such as food, pet food, and television programming.

== History ==
=== Books ===
In the 1980s, motivational speakers Jack Canfield and Mark Victor Hansen met after Canfield attended Hansen's lecture, "How to Triple Your Income and Double Your Time Off in Two Years or Less", at a holistic health event. Both Canfield and Hansen were proponents of the law of attraction—a New Thought belief that one's thoughts, positive or negative, attract corresponding events in life. The men compiled inspirational stories from other motivational speakers that they believed exemplified the law of attraction. The compilation became the first Chicken Soup for the Soul book, with the name coming from a dream Canfield had. Their pitch was rejected from major publishers in New York in 1991 before they found a small, self-help publisher in Florida called HCI, which they paid to print the first 20,000 copies of the book. Sales of the book soon boomed; attendees of their speaking events were required to buy several copies, and the book was sold at shops and funeral homes.

After the success of the first book, Canfield and Hansen, with HCI, published additional, similar Chicken Soup for the Soul titles, with many stories coming from reader submissions. In 1997, the two "began asking contributors to sign a pledge affirming that the stories they had submitted were true"; however, they did not take further steps to verify the stories' authenticity. Chicken Soup for the Soul books began to be aimed at specific demographics, such as Chicken Soup for the Teenage Soul, which came out in 1997 and was a major best-seller. New Chicken Soup for the Soul titles and sequels to existing books have been published on a regular basis since the first book came out in 1993. As of 2026, over 250 Chicken Soup for the Soul books have been published with 10 books coming out each year.In 2009, author Adeline Lee Zhia Ern was found to have plagiarized the story "Happiness" by Sarah Provençal from Jack Canfield's Chicken Soup for the Teenage Soul IV.

A 19-episode anthology series made up of stories from the series was produced and aired in the 1999–2000 television season by PAX TV, the current-day Ion Television.

=== Expansion from books and failed entertainment venture ===
In 2008, the founders, Canfield and Hansen, sold the company to a new ownership group led by William J. Rouhana and Robert D. Jacobs. Since then, all new titles have been published by Chicken Soup for the Soul Publishing, LLC, and distributed by Simon & Schuster.

Under the new ownership group, Chicken Soup for the Soul expanded into other products besides books. The company markets pet foods under the brand Chicken Soup for the Pet Lover's Soul and a line of soups, sauces, and other prepared foods under the brand Chicken Soup for the Soul. Before the business sale in 2008, books were 90% of the company's profit. Three years after Rouhana and Jacobs purchased Chicken Soup for the Soul, books were only 50% of the company's profit.

In 2016, Chicken Soup for the Soul launched a podcast, hosted by editor-in-chief, Amy Newmark. In the podcast, with episodes typically under 20 minutes, Newark "shares her favorite stories and the wisdom, advice, and easy-to-implement tips that thousands of people have shared in more than 30 years of Chicken Soup for the Soul books"

Chicken Soup for the Soul Entertainment went public in 2017. In November 2017, it acquired Screen Media Ventures, LLC, an independent television and film distribution company, which included Popcornflix, an ad-based online video service.

On July 10, 2024, a bankruptcy judge ordered Chicken Soup for the Soul Entertainment to undergo a Chapter 7 bankruptcy liquidation after accusing Rouhana of misusing the business and failing to pay employees or support healthcare. With the Chapter 7 conversion, the company's assets will be liquidated, resulting in the cessation of its subsidiaries, including Crackle, Popcornflix, and Redbox. In addition, over 1,000 employees were laid off, and over 26,000 Redbox kiosks were shut down permanently.

== Reception ==
Historian David Gray contends that the series is "part of a rise in motivational rhetoric and 'neoliberal mysticism' that dovetailed with a decline in job security, medical benefits, and wages for American workers."

In 2025, the podcast American Hysteria released two episodes about the history of Chicken Soup for the Soul and the current standings of the company. Chelsea Weber-Smith, the host of American Hysteria, criticized Canfield and Hansen for preaching prosperity theology through their books.

== Awards ==
The original series held a spot on the New York Times Best Seller list continuously from 1994 to 1998.

== See also ==
- List of Chicken Soup for the Soul books
