= Mark Victor Hansen =

American inspirational and motivational speaker, trainer and author

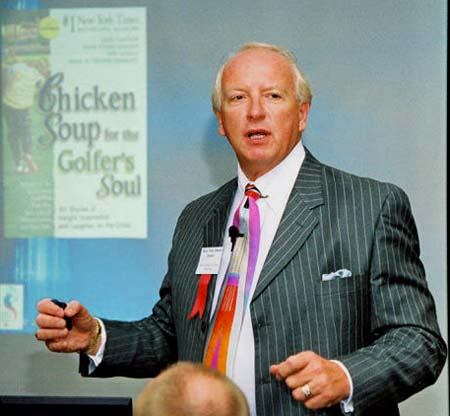
- Born: January 8, 1948 (age 78); Waukegan, Illinois, U.S.
- Education: Southern Illinois University
- Occupations: Motivational speaker, trainer, author
- Years active: 1993—present

Mark Victor Hansen (born January 8, 1948) is an American inspirational and motivational speaker, trainer and author. He is best known as the founder and co-creator of the Chicken Soup for the Soul book series.

== Early life ==
Hansen was born to Danish immigrants, Una and Paul Hansen. He grew up in Waukegan, Illinois. He graduated from Southern Illinois University in 1970 with a B.A. in speech communications.

== Publications ==
Hansen is best known for creating the Chicken Soup for the Soul along with business partner Jack Canfield. More than 500 million Chicken Soup books have sold internationally and along more than 100 licensed products. The name "Chicken Soup" was chosen because of the use of chicken soup as a home remedy for the sick. The first Chicken Soup book, published by Health Communications, Inc., sold more than 2 million copies. There are now over 500 million copies in print and in 54 languages worldwide.

In 2005, Hansen co-wrote the book Cracking the Millionaire Code along with Robert Allen, in which he highlights several self-made millionaires such as Bob Circosta, Michael Dell, Bill Gates, Alexander Graham Bell, Oprah Winfrey, and others as examples of how to build wealth.

In 2006, Hansen co-wrote the book How to Make the Rest of your Life The Best of your Life with Art Linkletter. In 2010, Hansen co-authored the book Cash in a Flash with Robert Allen as the sequel to the New York Times bestseller The One Minute Millionaire.

== Recognition ==
In 2004 Hansen was inducted into the Sales & Marketing Executive International’s Hall of Fame, receiving the Ambassador of Free Enterprise award. He is also the recipient of the 2004 Visionary Philanthropist for Youth Award by Covenant House of CA.

In 2002 The University of Toledo presented Hansen with an Honorary PhD in Business Administration and established the Mark Victor Hansen Entrepreneurial Excellence Fund that will help shape the minds of future business leaders and assist in the development of the faculty who will teach them.

In 2000 The Horatio Alger Association of Distinguished Americans honored Hansen with the prestigious Horatio Alger Award as an American leader who personifies the virtues and principles inherent in the success stories written by nineteenth-century American author Horatio Alger Jr.

In 2000 Northwood University honored Hansen as the Outstanding Business Leader of the Year.

== Charity work ==
Hansen is involved in and supports charities such as Horatio Alger Scholarships, Habitat for Humanity, American Red Cross, Operation Smile, Oceana, March of Dimes, Covenant House and Childhelp.

== Personal life ==
Mark Victor Hansen was married to Patty Hansen, who oversaw licensing for the Chicken Soup franchise. They divorced in 2007 after a 26-year marriage.
