= Screen Media =

American-Canadian media company (2001–2024)

Screen Media Ventures, LLC
- Type: Subsidiary
- Industry: Film distribution
- Founded: 2001; 25 years ago in New York City, New York, US
- Defunct: July 11, 2024; 2 years ago
- Fate: Chapter 7 bankruptcy liquidation by parent company; library sold to Magnolia Pictures
- Headquarters: Toronto, Canada
- Parent: Chicken Soup for the Soul Entertainment
- Website: screenmediafilms.net at the Wayback Machine (archived 2024-06-01)

Screen Media Ventures, LLC was an American-Canadian distribution company founded in 2001 and owned by Chicken Soup for the Soul Entertainment since 2017 alongside its subsidiary Popcornflix. In 2008, Screen Media selected The Creative Coalition as its exclusive nonprofit partner in launching the Spotlight Initiative. The partnership permits the pursuit of active outreach efforts for issues showcased in Screen Media produced and distributed motion pictures. While the Spotlight Initiative serves as a strategic business component that will create unique marketing, branding, and advertising opportunities as well as value for mass marketers, it also enhances America's cultural connection to the stories and social agendas of our times.

On April 23, 2024, Chicken Soup for the Soul Entertainment announced a $636.6 million loss in 2023, and warned that without any options to generate additional financing, the company may be forced to liquidate or pause operations, and seek a potential Chapter 11 bankruptcy protection filing. On June 29, 2024, the company filed for Chapter 11 bankruptcy protection after missing a week of paying its employees and failing to secure financing. In July 2024, Chicken Soup for the Soul Entertainment was placed in Chapter 7 liquidation, which instigated the cessation of its subsidiaries, including Screen Media.

== Selected films ==
- Kevin of the North (2001, DVD release 2003 as Chilly Dogs)
- Noel (2004, DVD release)
- Intimate Affaires (2002, DVD release 2007)
- Shaka Zulu: The Citadel (2005)
- Pitcher and the Pin-Up (2005)
- Spin (2005)
- Shallow Ground (2005)
- Strange Bedfellows (2005)
- The Foursome (2006)
- Big Bad Wolf (2006)
- Christmas Is Here Again (2007)
- Spy School (2008)
- Smother (2008)
- Dog Gone (2008)
- (Untitled) (2009, DVD release 2010)
- The City of Your Final Destination (2009, released 2010)
- The Tender Hook (2008, DVD release 2011 as The Boxer and the Bombshell)
- Confessions of a Sociopathic Social Climber (2005 TVM, DVD release)
- Sweatshop (2009, DVD release 2011)
- Jack and the Beanstalk (2010, DVD release)
- La Mission (2010)
- Kalamity (2010)
- The Key Man (2011)
- Stonerville (2011, DVD release)
- FUBAR 2 a.k.a. FUBAR: Balls to the Wall (2010, 2011 DVD and Blu-ray release)
- Ghost from the Machine (2011)
- Dog Jack (2012)
- About Fifty (2012)
- Daddy Can't Dance (2012)
- Inkubus (2012)
- Young Ones (2014)
- Ride (2014)
- United Passions (2014)
- Alex of Venice (2014)
- 7 Chinese Brothers (2015)
- Ten Thousand Saints (2015)
- Darling (2015)
- The Bet (2016)
- The Bad Batch (2016)
- The Void (2016)
- Temple (2017)
- Jeepers Creepers 3 (2017)
- Drone (2017)
- Ripped (2017)
- Curvature (2017)
- Literally, Right Before Aaron (2017)
- Teleios (Beyond the Trek) (2017)
- Josie (2018)
- Blue Iguana (2018)
- Bel Canto (2018)
- Change in the Air (2018)
- Elliot the Littlest Reindeer (2018)
- The Mercy (2018)
- You Might Be the Killer (2018)
- Adult Life Skills (2019)
- Patrick (2019)
- The Man Who Killed Don Quixote (2019)
- Clara (2019)
- A Violent Separation (2019)
- Wonders of the Sea 3D (2019)
- Deep Murder (2019)
- Luz (2019)
- Liam Gallagher: As It Was (2019)
- Corporate Animals (2019)
- Memory: The Origins of Alien (2019)
- Crown Vic (2019)
- Grand Isle (2020)
- The Sonata (2020)
- The Jesus Rolls (2020)
- Robert the Bruce (2020)
- Hope Gap (2020)
- Blood and Money (2020)
- Exit Plan (2020)
- The Outpost (2020)
- Blackbird (2020)
- Cagefighter: Worlds Collide (2020)
- Girl (2020)
- Willy's Wonderland (2021)
- Skyfire (2021)
- Senior Moment (2021)
- Eat Wheaties! (2021)
- Off the Rails (2021)
- Street Gang: How We Got to Sesame Street (2021)
- The Birthday Cake (2021)
- One Shot (2021)
- Stoker Hills (2022)
- 9 Bullets (2022)
- Monstrous (2022)
- Jeepers Creepers: Reborn (2022)
- Helen's Dead (2023)
