= Jack Canfield =

American writer & speaker (born 1944)

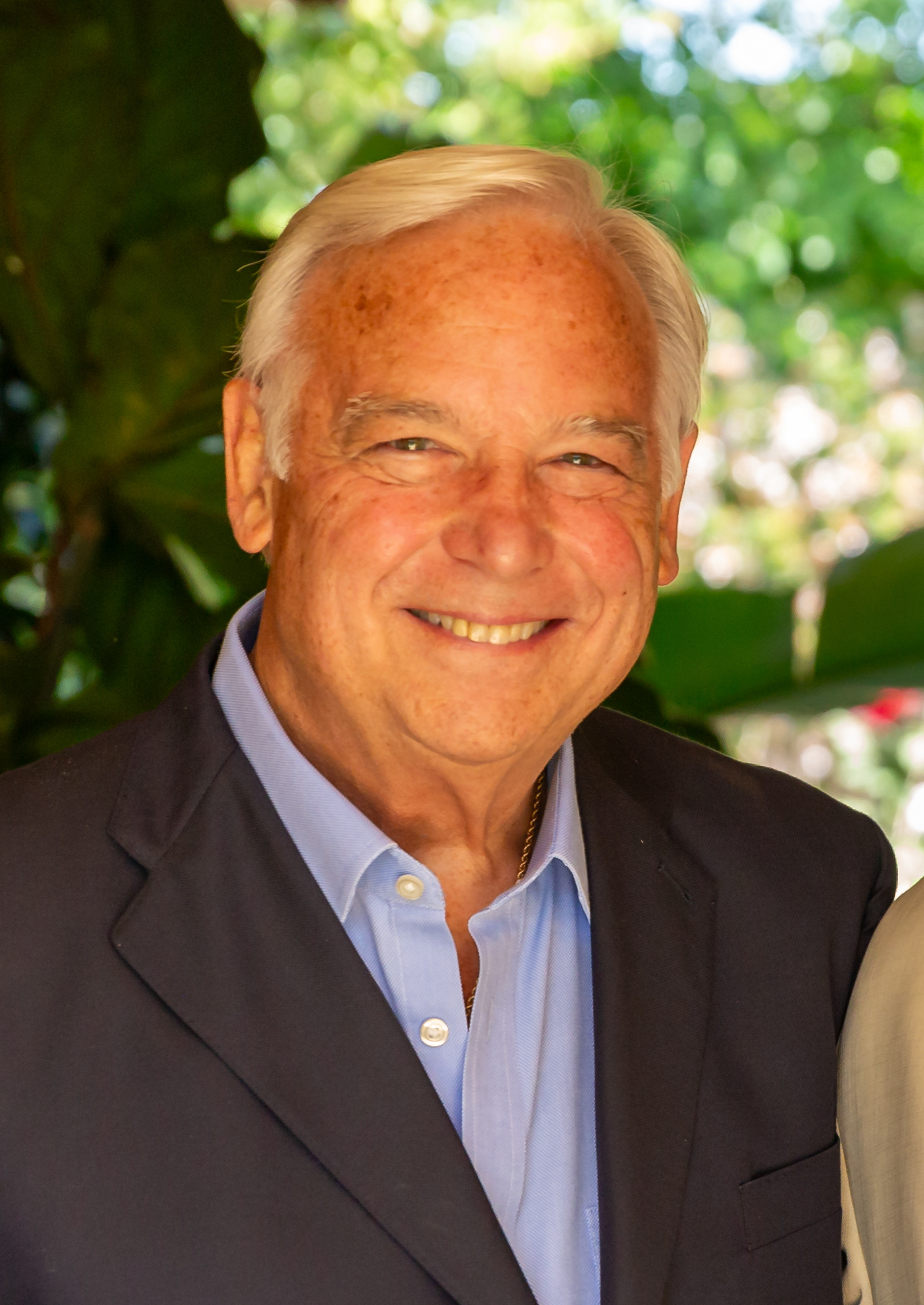
- Jack Canfield in 2024
- Born: August 19, 1944 (age 81); Fort Worth, Texas, U.S.
- Occupations: Motivational speaker, author
- Known for: Chicken Soup for the Soul series
- Spouses: Judith Ohlbaum (m. 1971; div. 1976) Georgia Lee Noble (m. 1978; div. 1999) Inga Marie Mahoney (m. 2001)
- Children: 3
- Website: jackcanfield.com

Jack Canfield (born August 19, 1944) is an American author and motivational speaker. He is the co-author of the Chicken Soup for the Soul series, which has more than 250 titles and 500 million copies in print in over 40 languages. In 2005 Canfield co-authored with Janet Switzer The Success Principles: How to Get From Where You Are to Where You Want to Be.

== Early life and education ==
Canfield was born in Fort Worth, Texas on August 19, 1944. He spent his teen years in Wheeling, West Virginia and graduated from the Linsly Military Institute in 1962. Canfield received his B.A. in Chinese History from Harvard University in 1966. He received his M.Ed. in 1973 from the University of Massachusetts Amherst. Canfield received an honorary Ph.D. from the University of Santa Monica in 1981.

== Career ==
Canfield began his career in 1967 when he taught a year of high school in Chicago, Illinois. He worked at the Clinton Job Corps Center in Iowa and the W. Clement and Jessie V. Stone Foundation in Chicago. In 1976 Canfield co-authored 100 Ways to Enhance Self-Concept in the Classroom. He ran a residential Gestalt center called the New England Center for Personal and Organizational Development and was named one of the Ten Outstanding Young Men of America (TOYA) by the U.S. Jaycees in 1978.

Canfield is the founder and CEO of The Canfield Training Group in Santa Barbara, California and founder of The Foundation for Self-Esteem in Culver City, California. Canfield hosts a radio program and writes a globally syndicated newspaper column. He holds a Guinness World Record for having seven books on the New York Times bestseller list at the same time. In 2006 Canfield was featured in a self-development film called The Secret. His best known books include: The Power of Focus, The Aladdin Factor, and Dare to Win. In 2005 Canfield co-authored The Success Principles: How to Get from Where You Are to Where You Want to Be. He is a founding member of the Transformational Leadership Council.

=== Chicken Soup for the Soul ===
Canfield coauthored Chicken Soup for the Soul with Mark Victor Hansen in 1993. According to USA Today, Chicken Soup for the Soul was the third bestselling book in the United States during the mid-1990s. Canfield later co-authored dozens of additional books in the Chicken Soup for the Soul series.

=== The Success Principles ===
In his book The Success Principles: How to Get from Where You Are to Where You Want to Be, Jack Canfield has collected what he asserts to be 67 essential principles for attaining goals and creating a successful life.

== Personal life ==
Canfield married Judith Ohlbaum in 1971 and they had two sons together, Oran and Kyle, before divorcing in 1976. Canfield left the family and moved in with a masseuse in 1976, while his wife was pregnant with their second son. His son Oran has written two memoirs, Freefall: The Strange True Life Growing Up Adventures of Oran Canfield and Long Past Stopping: A Memoir.

In 1978, he married Georgia Lee Noble, with whom he had one son, Christopher. They divorced in 1999. He married Inga Marie Mahoney in 2001, and is stepfather to her children, Travis and Riley.

== Bibliography ==
- Canfield, Jack, and Mark Victor Hansen. 1993. Chicken Soup for the Soul. Deerfield Beach: Health Communications. ISBN 161159913X
- Canfield, Jack, and Mark Victor Hansen. 1995. The Aladdin Factor. New York: Berkley Book. ISBN 9780425150757
- Canfield, Jack, Mark Victor Hansen, and Les Hewitt. 2000. The Power of Focus: How to Hit Your Business, Personal and Financial Targets with Absolute Certainty. Deerfield Beach: Health Communications. ISBN 0757316026
- Canfield, Jack, and Janet Switzer. 2005. The Success Principles: How to Get from Where You Are to Where You Want to Be. New York: Harper Element. ISBN 0062912895
- Canfield, Jack, and D.D. Watkins. 2007. Jack Canfield's Key to Living the Law of Attraction: A Simple Guide to Creating the Life of Your Dreams. Deerfield Beach: Health Communications.
- Canfield, Jack. 2007. Maximum Confidence: Ten Secrets of Extreme Self-Esteem. Audio CD – Audiobook. New York: Simon & Schuster Audio/Nightingale-Conant.
- Canfield, Jack. 2008. The Success Principles for Teens: How to Get From Where You Are to Where You Want to Be. HCI Teens; Illustrated edition. ISBN 0757307272
- Canfield, Jack and Pamela Bruner, 2013. Tapping Into Ultimate Success: How to Overcome Any Obstacle and Skyrocket Your Results. Hay House Inc. ISBN 1401939562
- Canfield, Jack and Peter Chee, 2013. Coaching for Breakthrough Success: Proven Techniques for Making Impossible Dreams Possible. McGraw-Hill Education. ISBN 0071804633
- Canfield, Jack, and Janet Switzer. 2015. The Success Principles: How to Get from Where You Are to Where You Want to Be 10th Anniversary Edition. New York: HarperCollins Publishers. ISBN 0723247919
- Canfield, Jack, 2016. 30-Day Sobriety Solution: How To Cut Back Or Quit Drinking In The Privacy Of Your Own Home. Atria Books. ISBN 1476792968
- Canfield, Jack, 2017. Success Affirmations: 52 Weeks for Living a Passionate and Purposeful Life. Health Communications Inc. ISBN 0757320120
- Canfield, Jack, 2019. The Ultimate Jack Canfield Library: Create the Life You Desire (Audio Book). Nightingale-Conant. ASIN B07PXH4ZCR
