= Popcornflix =

American streaming service

Popcornflix LLC
- Founded: July 2010; 16 years ago
- Headquarters: New York City, New York, U.S.
- Owner: David Nagelberg
- Website: https://popcornflix.com

Popcornflix LLC is a website and over-the-top (OTT) service offering free ad-supported streaming video of feature-length movies and webisodes owned by David Nagelberg, a former investor at Chicken Soup for the Soul Entertainment. In July 2024, Chicken Soup for the Soul Entertainment was placed in Chapter 7 liquidation, which instigated cessation and disposal of its subsidiaries, including Popcornflix, and later, emerged and back online under David Nagelberg in 2025. As of 2025, it was owned by Future Today Inc.

== History ==
Popcornflix was conceived in July 2010, and went into live beta in March 2011. The site primarily streamed independent feature films, many of which come from Screen Media's library. The service is accessible in the United States and Canada, with plans to launch in more territories. In 2017, Popcornflix's owner, Screen Media Ventures, was acquired by Chicken Soup for the Soul Entertainment.

On April 23, 2024, Chicken Soup for the Soul Entertainment announced a $636.6 million loss in 2023, and warned that without any options to generate additional financing, the company may be forced to liquidate or pause operations, and seek a potential Chapter 11 bankruptcy protection filing. On June 29, 2024, the company filed for Chapter 11 bankruptcy protection after missing a week of paying its employees and failing to secure financing. On July 11, the U.S. Bankruptcy Court approved a conversion of the bankruptcy to Chapter 7, which would signal a liquidation of the company's assets, and the cessation of its subsidiaries, including Popcornflix. After liquidation, Popcornflix is back online under David Nagelberg.

== Platforms ==
Popcornflix was available on the following platforms:

- Popcornflix.com (web based access)
- Roku
- Amazon Fire TV
- Xbox 360
- Xbox One
- Xbox Series X/S
- Apple TV
- iPhone
- iPad
- iPod Touch
- Android TV
- Chromecast
- PlayStation 3
- PlayStation 4
- PlayStation 5
- Kodi

== Programming ==
In addition to full-length independent movies, Popcornflix featured original content including web series and film school originals. The service was accessible in the United States and Canada, and plans to launch in more territories were cancelled.
