= Kids' Choice Award for Favorite Book =

Television awards show

This is a list of winners at the Nickelodeon Kids' Choice for Favorite Book, given at the Nickelodeon Kids' Choice Awards.

== Winners and nominees ==
Winners are listed first, highlighted in yellow and boldface, and indicated with a double dagger (‡).

=== 1990s ===
Year	Book	Author(s)	Other awards
1995	**Deep Trouble** ‡	**R. L. Stine**	
1995	Halloween Night II	R. L. Stine	
1995	The Last Vampire	Christopher Pike	
1996	**Tales to Give You Goosebumps Special Edition #1** ‡	**R. L. Stine**	
1996	The Babysitter IV	R. L. Stine	
1996	The Indian in the Cupboard	Lynne Reid Banks	
1996	Pocahontas Illustrated Classic	Gina Ingoglia	
1997	**Matilda** ‡	**Roald Dahl**	
1997	How to Kill a Monster	R. L. Stine	Goosebumps was nominated for "Favorite TV Show".
1997	James and the Giant Peach	Roald Dahl	
1997	The Girl Who Cried Monster	R. L. Stine	Goosebumps was nominated for "Favorite TV Show".
1998	**Goosebumps: Deep Trouble II** ‡	**R. L. Stine**	
1998	The Alien	K. A. Applegate	
1998	Falling Up	Shel Silverstein	
1998	The Giver	Lois Lowry	
1999	**Chicken Soup for the Kid's Soul** ‡	**Jack Canfield and Mark Victor Hansen**	
1999	The Discovery	K. A. Applegate	
1999	Godzilla	Marc Cerasini	
1999	Titanic Crossing	Barbara Williams	

=== 2000s ===
Year	Book	Author(s)	Other awards
2000	**Harry Potter series** ‡	**J. K. Rowling**	
2000	Animorphs series	K. A. Applegate	
2000	Chicken Soup for the Child's Soul	Various	
2000	Star Wars: Episode I – The Phantom Menace	Terry Brooks	
2001	**Harry Potter** ‡	**J. K. Rowling**	
2001	Animorphs	K. A. Applegate	
2001	Bud, Not Buddy	Christopher Paul Curtis	
2001	Chicken Soup for the Soul Series	Various	
2002	**Harry Potter series** ‡	**J. K. Rowling**	Harry Potter and the Sorcerer's Stone was nominated for "Favorite Movie" while the video game adaptation got nominated for "Favorite Video Game".
2002	Atlantis: The Lost Empire		
2002	Chicken Soup for the Teenage Soul	Jack Canfield, Kimberly Kirberger, and Mark Victor Hansen	
2002	Shrek!	William Steig	Shrek was nominated for "Favorite Movie". Eddie Murphy won "Favorite Voice in a Animated Movie" while Cameron Diaz and Mike Myers also got nominated.
2003	**A Series of Unfortunate Events** ‡	**Lemony Snicket**	
2003	Captain Underpants series	Dav Pilkey	
2003	Double Fudge	Judy Blume	
2003	Harry Potter series	J. K. Rowling	Harry Potter and the Chamber of Secrets was nominated for "Favorite Movie" while the video game adaptation got nominated for "Favorite Video Game".
2004	**Harry Potter series** ‡	**J. K. Rowling**	Harry Potter: Quidditch World Cup got nominated for "Favorite Video Game".
2004	Captain Underpants series	Dav Pilkey	
2004	Holes	Louis Sachar	
2004	The Lord of the Rings	J. R. R. Tolkien	
2005	**A Series of Unfortunate Events** ‡	**Lemony Snicket**	Jim Carrey was nominated for "Favorite Movie Actor".
2005	A Wrinkle in Time	Madeleine L'Engle	
2005	Harry Potter series	J. K. Rowling	Harry Potter and the Prisoner of Azkaban was nominated for "Favorite Movie".
2005	Holes	Louis Sachar	
2006	**Harry Potter series** ‡	**J. K. Rowling**	Harry Potter and the Goblet of Fire won for "Favorite Movie".
2006	A Series of Unfortunate Events	Lemony Snicket	
2006	The Chronicles of Narnia	C. S. Lewis	
2006	The Giving Tree	Shel Silverstein	
2007	**Harry Potter series** ‡	**J. K. Rowling**	
2007	A Series of Unfortunate Events	Lemony Snicket	
2007	How to Eat Fried Worms	Thomas Rockwell	
2007	Island of the Blue Dolphins	Scott O'Dell	
2008	**Harry Potter series** ‡	**J. K. Rowling**	
2008	Buffy the Vampire Slayer Season Eight	Various	
2008	Diary of a Wimpy Kid	Jeff Kinney	
2008	How to Eat Fried Worms	Thomas Rockwell	
2009	**Twilight series** ‡	**Stephenie Meyer**	
2009	Diary of a Wimpy Kid	Jeff Kinney	
2009	Diary of a Wimpy Kid Do-It-Yourself Book	Jeff Kinney	
2009	Harry Potter series	J. K. Rowling	

=== 2010s ===
Year	Book	Author(s)	Other awards
2010	**Diary of a Wimpy Kid** ‡	**Jeff Kinney**	
2010	Twilight series	Stephenie Meyer	The Twilight Saga: New Moon was nominated for "Favorite Movie". Taylor Lautner won for "Favorite Movie Actor". Taylor Lautner and Kristen Stewart won for "Cutest Couple" while Robert Pattinson and Kristen Stewart also got nominated.
2010	The Vampire Diaries	L. J. Smith	
2010	Where the Sidewalk Ends	Shel Silverstein	
2011	**Diary of a Wimpy Kid** ‡	**Jeff Kinney**	Diary of a Wimpy Kid was nominated for "Favorite Movie".
2011	Dork Diaries	Rachel Renée Russell	
2011	Vampire Academy	Richelle Mead	
2011	Witch and Wizard	Various	
2012	**Diary of a Wimpy Kid** ‡	**Jeff Kinney**	
2012	Harry Potter series	J. K. Rowling	Harry Potter and the Deathly Hallows – Part 2 was nominated for "Favorite Movie". Daniel Radcliffe was nominated for "Favorite Movie Actor". Emma Watson was nominated for "Favorite Movie Actress".
2012	The Hunger Games series	Suzanne Collins	
2012	Twilight series	Stephenie Meyer	Kristen Stewart won for "Favorite Movie Actress".
2013	**The Hunger Games series** ‡	**Suzanne Collins**	The Hunger Games won for "Favorite Movie". Jennifer Lawrence was nominated for "Favorite Movie Actress".
2013	Diary of a Wimpy Kid	Jeff Kinney	Diary of a Wimpy Kid: Dog Days was nominated for "Favorite Movie". Zachary Gordon was nominated for "Favorite Movie Actor".
2013	Harry Potter series	J. K. Rowling	
2013	Magic Tree House	Mary Pope Osborne	
2014	**Diary of a Wimpy Kid** ‡	**Jeff Kinney**	
2014	Harry Potter series	J. K. Rowling	
2014	The Hobbit	J. R. R. Tolkien	Evangeline Lilly was nominated for "Favorite Female Buttkicker".
2014	The Hunger Games series	Suzanne Collins	The Hunger Games: Catching Fire won for "Favorite Movie". Jennifer Lawrence won for both "Favorite Movie Actress" and "Favorite Female Buttkicker". Jena Malone was also nominated for the latter.
2015	**Diary of a Wimpy Kid** ‡	**Jeff Kinney**	
2015	The Divergent series	Veronica Roth	
2015	The Fault in Our Stars	John Green	
2015	The Heroes of Olympus series	Rick Riordan	
2015	The Maze Runner	James Dashner	
2015	Percy Jackson's Greek Gods	Rick Riordan	
2016	**Diary of a Wimpy Kid** ‡	**Jeff Kinney**	
2016	Diary of a Minecraft Zombie	Zack Zombie	
2016	Harry Potter series	J. K. Rowling	
2016	The Hunger Games series	Suzanne Collins	The Hunger Games: Mockingjay – Part 2 was nominated for "Favorite Movie". Jennifer Lawrence won for "Favorite Movie Actress".
2016	The Maze Runner series	James Dashner	
2016	Star Wars: Absolutely Everything You Need To Know	Adam Bray, Cole Horton, Michael Kogge, and Kerrie Dougherty	Star Wars: The Force Awakens won for "Favorite Movie". John Boyega was nominated for "Favorite Movie Actor". Daisy Ridley was nominated for "Favorite Movie Actress".

=== 2020s ===
Year	Book	Author(s)	Other awards
2023	**Harry Potter series** ‡	**J. K. Rowling**	
2023	The Bad Guys series	Aaron Blabey	The Bad Guys was nominated for "Favorite Animated Movie". Awkwafina was nominated for "Favorite Voice from an Animated Movie (Female)".
2023	Captain Underpants series	Dav Pilkey	
2023	Cat Kid Comic Club series	Dav Pilkey	
2023	Diary of a Wimpy Kid	Jeff Kinney	
2023	Five Nights at Freddy's books	Various	
