= Nickelodeon Kids' Choice Awards =

American annual awards ceremony show

- Previous: 2026 Kids' Choice Awards; November 14, 2026
- Country: United States
- Presented by: Nickelodeon
- Rewards: Kaleidoscope (within all trophy designs, alone in 1987); Statuette (1988–89); KCA blimp (orange for standard color, other colors for special awards) (1990–present)
- First award: March 28, 1987; 39 years ago
- Website: www.nick.com/kids-choice-awards/

Television/radio coverage
- Networks
- Nickelodeon; CBS (since 2026)
- Runtime: appx. 90 minutes

The Nickelodeon Kids' Choice Awards, also known as the KCAs or Kids' Choice, is an American annual awards ceremony show produced by Nickelodeon. Usually held on a Saturday night in March or early April, the show honors the year's biggest in television, film, music, and sports as voted by viewers worldwide of Nickelodeon networks. Winners receive a hollow orange blimp figurine, a logo outline for much of the network's 1984–2009 era, which also functions as a kaleidoscope.

The show features numerous celebrity guests and musical acts, including live acts. It has also been known to cover people with the network's trademark green slime: since 2002, slime stunts have been incorporated into the show. The animated series SpongeBob SquarePants has won the most KCA awards, with twenty-three overall through the series' run. Individually, Selena Gomez won the most trophies (with 13), followed by Adam Sandler (with 12), Will Smith, Taylor Swift, Ariana Grande (each with 11), and Justin Bieber (with 9). Whoopi Goldberg and Steven Spielberg are the only people to have won a Kids' Choice Award alongside the prevailing "EGOT" combination of an Emmy, Grammy, Oscar, and Tony. Rosie O'Donnell has hosted the show eight times, followed by Jack Black (three times), as well as Candace Cameron, Whitney Houston, and John Cena (twice each).

== History ==
Alan Goodman, Albie Hecht, and Fred Seibert created the awards show after Nickelodeon produced a segment called The Big Ballot for the movie review show Rated K: For Kids by Kids in 1987, named for the ballots kids voted with. To vote, the viewers would send in ballots and then before the show, the ballots would be counted and the winners would tape a "thank you" video that would be shown during the program. Goodman, Hecht, and Seibert felt that the network needed a bigger, more exciting platform.

Hecht selected the awards logo from a series of network designs created by original logo designers Tom Corey and Scott Nash (Corey McPherson Nash, Boston), overseen by Goodman and Seibert (Fred/Alan, Inc., New York). The award was configured into the current blimp shape/kaleidoscope in 1990. The only change to the award since then has been a change to the embossed logotype on the side of the trophy for 2010 to fit the network's new logo typeface.

As the Internet came into widespread use, the voting finally moved from a combination of 900 number telephone voting and filling paper ballots that were either mailed or completed at Pizza Hut locations, to being conducted exclusively on the network's website, and included text messaging by 2007. During the early years of Internet voting, there were several issues, including the digital equivalent of ballot stuffing and adult voting. As a result, a new system was put into place where one vote per Nick.com account is allowed (although it is probable adults still cast votes via the texting option, which is connected to a phone number only instead of a screen name, by creating an account with a false age, or by having their children vote for a chosen subject instead). In 2010, an iPhone application and mobile browser voting were also added.

The 2009 Kids' Choice Awards featured a new award called "The Big Green Help Award" which goes to the celebrity who goes above and beyond to help the Earth. The inaugural award was presented to Leonardo DiCaprio. For the 2010 awards, "The Big Green Help" award was renamed "The Big Help" award, with First Lady Michelle Obama winning the first award under the rename.

Unlike traditional awards shows, the Kids' Choice Awards uses other items to announce an award winner instead of a traditional envelope. The show sometimes uses balloons, T-shirts, models, giant letters, stickers, and even a foot.

Voting became available for Canadian people in time for the 2010 ceremony, owing to the inauguration of Nickelodeon's Canadian service in November 2009.

The 2020 ceremony was held in a virtual format in the wake of the COVID-19 pandemic.

The 2024 ceremony was the first to not air in March or April since 2020; it was hosted on July 13 and was the first ceremony hosted by animated characters, SpongeBob SquarePants and Patrick Star, to honor the 25th anniversary of SpongeBob SquarePants.

The 2026 ceremony, which was held on November 14 (the first time since 1992 that a ceremony was held late into the year), was the first to simulcast on CBS.

=== International history ===
In June 2010, Nickelodeon Latin America announced a Kids' Choice Awards for Mexico. Other countries with their own Kids' Choice Awards include Brazil, United Kingdom, Australia, and Indonesia, which are either fully original local productions, or inserted as continuity during their broadcast of the U.S. ceremony. The Australian Kids' Choice Awards had its final local ceremony in 2012.

In August 2011, Nickelodeon Latin America announced a Kids' Choice Awards event for Argentina.

In June 2014, Nickelodeon Latin America announced a Kids' Choice Awards event for Colombia.

== Awards ==
This table shows the awards that were presented over the years. An asterisk next to a category indicates an award has been presented in that particular category every year since the inception of the Kids' Choice Awards in 1988.

	1980s		1990s									2000s										2010s										2020s						
	1988	1989	1990	1991	1992	1994	1995	1996	1997	1998	1999	2000	2001	2002	2003	2004	2005	2006	2007	2008	2009	2010	2011	2012	2013	2014	2015	2016	2017	2018	2019	2020	2021	2022	2023	2024	2025	2026
Favorite Movie*	Yes	Yes	Yes	Yes	Yes	Yes	Yes	Yes	Yes	Yes	Yes	Yes	Yes	Yes	Yes	Yes	Yes	Yes	Yes	Yes	Yes	Yes	Yes	Yes	Yes	Yes	Yes	Yes	Yes	Yes	Yes	Yes	Yes	Yes	Yes	Yes	Yes	Yes
Favorite Movie Actor*	Yes	Yes	Yes	Yes	Yes	Yes	Yes	Yes	Yes	Yes	Yes	Yes	Yes	Yes	Yes	Yes	Yes	Yes	Yes	Yes	Yes	Yes	Yes	Yes	Yes	Yes	Yes	Yes	Yes	Yes	Yes	Yes	Yes	Yes	Yes	Yes	Yes	Yes
Favorite Movie Actress*	Yes	Yes	Yes	Yes	Yes	Yes	Yes	Yes	Yes	Yes	Yes	Yes	Yes	Yes	Yes	Yes	Yes	Yes	Yes	Yes	Yes	Yes	Yes	Yes	Yes	Yes	Yes	Yes	Yes	Yes	Yes	Yes	Yes	Yes	Yes	Yes	Yes	Yes
Favorite TV Show	Yes	Yes	Yes	Yes	Yes	Yes	Yes	Yes	Yes	Yes	Yes	Yes	Yes	Yes	Yes	Yes	Yes	Yes	Yes	Yes	Yes	Yes	Yes	Yes	Yes	Yes	No	Yes	Yes	Yes	No	No	No	No	No	No	No	No
Favorite Male TV Star	Yes	Yes	Yes	Yes	Yes	Yes	Yes	Yes	Yes	Yes	Yes	Yes	Yes	Yes	Yes	Yes	Yes	Yes	Yes	Yes	Yes	Yes	Yes	Yes	Yes	Yes	Yes	No	Yes	Yes	Yes	Yes	Yes	No	No	Yes	No	No
Favorite Female TV Star	Yes	Yes	Yes	Yes	Yes	Yes	Yes	Yes	Yes	Yes	Yes	Yes	Yes	Yes	Yes	Yes	Yes	Yes	Yes	Yes	Yes	Yes	Yes	Yes	Yes	Yes	Yes	No	Yes	Yes	Yes	Yes	Yes	No	No	Yes	No	No
Favorite Music Group	No	No	No	No	No	Yes	Yes	Yes	Yes	Yes	Yes	Yes	Yes	Yes	Yes	Yes	Yes	Yes	Yes	Yes	Yes	Yes	Yes	Yes	Yes	Yes	Yes	Yes	Yes	Yes	Yes	Yes	Yes	Yes	Yes	Yes	Yes	Yes
Favorite Male Athlete	Yes	Yes	Yes	Yes	Yes	Yes	Yes	Yes	Yes	Yes	Yes	Yes	Yes	Yes	Yes	Yes	Yes	Yes	Yes	Yes	Yes	Yes	Yes	Yes	Yes	No	No	No	No	No	No	Yes	Yes	Yes	Yes	Yes	Yes	Yes
Favorite Female Athlete	Yes	Yes	Yes	Yes	Yes	Yes	Yes	Yes	Yes	Yes	Yes	Yes	Yes	Yes	Yes	Yes	Yes	Yes	Yes	Yes	Yes	Yes	Yes	Yes	Yes	No	No	No	No	No	No	Yes	Yes	Yes	Yes	Yes	Yes	Yes
Most Enthusiastic Athlete	No	No	No	No	No	No	No	No	No	No	No	No	No	No	No	No	No	No	No	No	No	No	No	No	No	Yes	No	No	No	No	No	No	No	No	No	No	No	No
Favorite Video Game	No	No	No	No	No	No	Yes	Yes	Yes	Yes	Yes	Yes	Yes	Yes	Yes	Yes	Yes	Yes	Yes	Yes	Yes	Yes	Yes	Yes	Yes	Yes	No	Yes	Yes	Yes	Yes	Yes	Yes	Yes	Yes	Yes	Yes	Yes
Favorite Sports Team	Yes	Yes	Yes	Yes	Yes	Yes	Yes	Yes	Yes	Yes	Yes	Yes	Yes	Yes	Yes	Yes	No	No	No	No	No	No	No	No	No	No	No	No	No	No	No	No	No	No	No	No	No	No
Hall of Fame Award	No	No	No	Yes	Yes	Yes	Yes	Yes	Yes	Yes	Yes	Yes	No	No	No	No	No	No	No	No	No	No	No	No	No	No	No	No	No	No	No	No	No	No	No	No	No	No
Wannabe Award	No	No	No	No	No	No	No	No	No	No	No	No	Yes	Yes	Yes	Yes	Yes	Yes	Yes	Yes	No	No	No	No	No	No	No	No	No	No	No	No	No	No	No	No	No	No
Big Help/Big Green Help Award	No	No	No	No	No	No	No	No	No	No	No	No	No	No	No	No	No	No	No	No	Yes	Yes	Yes	Yes	No	No	No	No	No	No	No	No	No	No	No	No	No	No
Favorite Animal Star	No	No	No	No	No	No	Yes	Yes	Yes	Yes	Yes	Yes	No	No	No	No	No	No	No	No	No	No	No	No	No	No	No	No	No	No	No	No	No	No	No	No	No	No
Cutest Couple	No	No	No	No	No	No	No	No	No	No	No	No	No	No	No	No	No	No	No	No	No	Yes	No	No	No	No	No	No	No	No	No	No	No	No	No	No	No	No
Favorite Book	No	No	No	No	No	No	Yes	Yes	Yes	Yes	Yes	Yes	Yes	Yes	Yes	Yes	Yes	Yes	Yes	Yes	Yes	Yes	Yes	Yes	Yes	Yes	Yes	Yes	No	No	No	No	No	No	Yes	No	No	No
Favorite Reality Show	No	No	No	No	No	No	No	No	No	No	No	No	No	No	No	No	No	No	No	Yes	Yes	Yes	Yes	Yes	Yes	Yes	Yes	No	Yes	No	Yes	Yes	Yes	Yes	Yes	Yes	Yes	Yes
Favorite TV Sidekick	No	No	No	No	No	No	No	No	No	No	No	No	No	No	No	No	No	No	No	No	No	No	Yes	Yes	No	No	No	No	No	No	No	No	No	No	No	No	No	No
Favorite Animated Animal Sidekick	No	No	No	No	No	No	No	No	No	No	No	No	No	No	No	No	No	No	No	No	No	No	No	No	No	Yes	No	No	No	No	No	No	No	No	No	No	No	No
Favorite Cartoon	No	No	No	No	No	No	Yes	Yes	Yes	Yes	Yes	Yes	Yes	Yes	Yes	Yes	Yes	Yes	Yes	Yes	Yes	Yes	Yes	Yes	Yes	Yes	Yes	Yes	Yes	Yes	Yes	Yes	Yes	Yes	Yes	Yes	Yes	Yes
Favorite Animated Movie	No	No	No	No	No	No	No	No	No	No	No	No	No	No	No	No	No	Yes	Yes	Yes	Yes	Yes	Yes	Yes	Yes	Yes	Yes	Yes	Yes	Yes	Yes	Yes	Yes	Yes	Yes	Yes	Yes	Yes
Favorite Voice from an Animated Movie	No	No	No	No	No	No	No	No	No	No	No	Yes	Yes	Yes	Yes	Yes	Yes	Yes	Yes	Yes	Yes	Yes	Yes	Yes	Yes	Yes	No	Yes	Yes	No	Yes	Yes	Yes	Yes	Yes	Yes	Yes	Yes
Favorite Buttkicker	No	No	No	No	No	No	No	No	No	No	No	No	No	No	No	No	No	No	No	No	No	No	Yes	Yes	No	No	No	No	Yes	No	Yes	No	No	No	No	No	Yes	No
Favorite Male Buttkicker	No	No	No	No	No	No	No	No	No	No	No	No	No	Yes	Yes	No	No	No	No	No	No	No	No	No	Yes	Yes	No	No	No	No	No	No	No	No	No	No	No	No
Favorite Female Buttkicker	No	No	No	No	No	No	No	No	No	No	No	No	No	Yes	Yes	No	No	No	No	No	No	No	No	No	Yes	Yes	No	No	No	No	No	No	No	No	No	No	No	No
Favorite Male Artist	Yes	Yes	Yes	Yes	Yes	No	No	No	No	No	No	Yes	Yes	Yes	Yes	Yes	Yes	Yes	Yes	Yes	Yes	Yes	Yes	Yes	Yes	Yes	Yes	Yes	Yes	Yes	Yes	Yes	Yes	Yes	Yes	Yes	Yes	Yes
Favorite Female Artist	Yes	Yes	Yes	Yes	Yes	No	No	No	No	No	No	Yes	Yes	Yes	Yes	Yes	Yes	Yes	Yes	Yes	Yes	Yes	Yes	Yes	Yes	Yes	Yes	Yes	Yes	Yes	Yes	Yes	Yes	Yes	Yes	Yes	Yes	Yes
Favorite Song*	Yes	Yes	Yes	Yes	Yes	Yes	Yes	Yes	Yes	Yes	Yes	Yes	Yes	Yes	Yes	Yes	Yes	Yes	Yes	Yes	Yes	Yes	Yes	Yes	Yes	Yes	Yes	Yes	Yes	Yes	Yes	Yes	Yes	Yes	Yes	Yes	Yes	Yes
Favorite App	No	No	No	No	No	No	No	No	No	No	No	No	No	No	No	No	No	No	No	No	No	No	No	No	Yes	Yes	No	No	No	No	No	No	No	No	No	No	No	No
Favorite Funny Star	No	No	No	No	No	No	No	No	No	No	No	No	No	No	No	No	No	No	No	No	No	No	No	No	No	Yes	No	No	No	No	No	No	No	No	No	No	No	No
Lifetime Achievement Award	No	No	No	No	No	No	No	No	No	No	No	No	No	No	No	No	No	No	No	No	No	No	No	No	No	Yes	No	No	No	No	No	No	No	No	Yes	No	No	No
Favorite Kids TV Show	No	No	No	No	No	No	No	No	No	No	No	No	No	No	No	No	No	No	No	No	No	No	No	No	No	No	Yes	Yes	Yes	No	No	Yes	Yes	Yes	Yes	Yes	Yes	Yes
Favorite Family TV Show	No	No	No	No	No	No	No	No	No	No	No	No	No	No	No	No	No	No	No	No	No	No	No	No	No	No	Yes	Yes	Yes	No	No	Yes	Yes	Yes	Yes	Yes	Yes	Yes
Most Addicting Game	No	No	No	No	No	No	No	No	No	No	No	No	No	No	No	No	No	No	No	No	No	No	No	No	No	No	Yes	No	No	No	No	No	No	No	No	No	No	No
Favorite Villain	No	No	No	No	No	No	No	No	No	No	No	No	No	No	No	No	No	No	No	No	No	No	No	No	Yes	No	Yes	No	Yes	No	No	No	No	No	No	Yes	Yes	Yes
Favorite Talent Competition Show	No	No	No	No	No	No	No	No	No	No	No	No	No	No	No	No	No	No	No	No	No	No	No	No	No	No	Yes	No	No	No	No	No	No	No	No	Yes	No	No
Favorite Male Action Star	No	No	No	No	No	No	No	No	No	No	No	No	No	No	No	No	No	No	No	No	No	No	No	No	No	No	Yes	No	No	No	No	No	No	No	No	No	No	No
Favorite Female Action Star	No	No	No	No	No	No	No	No	No	No	No	No	No	No	No	No	No	No	No	No	No	No	No	No	No	No	Yes	No	No	No	No	No	No	No	No	No	No	No
Favorite New Artist	No	No	No	No	No	No	No	No	No	No	No	No	No	No	No	No	No	No	No	No	No	No	No	No	No	No	Yes	Yes	Yes	Yes	Yes	Yes	No	Yes	Yes	Yes	Yes	No
Favorite Cooking Show	No	No	No	No	No	No	No	No	No	No	No	No	No	No	No	No	No	No	No	No	No	No	No	No	No	No	No	Yes	No	No	No	No	No	No	No	No	No	No
Favorite Collaboration	No	No	No	No	No	No	No	No	No	No	No	No	No	No	No	No	No	No	No	No	No	No	No	No	No	No	No	Yes	No	No	Yes	Yes	Yes	Yes	Yes	Yes	Yes	Yes
Favorite Male TV Star – Kids' Show	No	No	No	No	No	No	No	No	No	No	No	No	No	No	No	No	No	No	No	No	No	No	No	No	No	No	No	Yes	No	No	No	No	No	Yes	Yes	Yes	Yes	Yes
Favorite Male TV Star – Family Show	No	No	No	No	No	No	No	No	No	No	No	No	No	No	No	No	No	No	No	No	No	No	No	No	No	No	No	Yes	No	No	No	No	No	Yes	Yes	Yes	Yes	Yes
Favorite Female TV Star – Kids' Show	No	No	No	No	No	No	No	No	No	No	No	No	No	No	No	No	No	No	No	No	No	No	No	No	No	No	No	Yes	No	No	No	No	No	Yes	Yes	Yes	Yes	Yes
Favorite Female TV Star – Family Show	No	No	No	No	No	No	No	No	No	No	No	No	No	No	No	No	No	No	No	No	No	No	No	No	No	No	No	Yes	No	No	No	No	No	Yes	Yes	Yes	Yes	Yes
Favorite Global Music Star	No	No	No	No	No	No	No	No	No	No	No	No	No	No	No	No	No	No	No	No	No	No	No	No	No	No	No	No	Yes	Yes	Yes	Yes	Yes	Yes	Yes	Yes	Yes	Yes
Favorite Social Music Star	No	No	No	No	No	No	No	No	No	No	No	No	No	No	No	No	No	No	No	No	No	No	No	No	No	No	No	No	No	No	Yes	Yes	No	Yes	Yes	Yes	No	No
BFFs (Best Friends Forever)	No	No	No	No	No	No	No	No	No	No	No	No	No	No	No	No	No	No	No	No	No	No	No	No	No	No	No	No	Yes	No	No	No	No	No	No	No	No	No
Favorite Frenemies	No	No	No	No	No	No	No	No	No	No	No	No	No	No	No	No	No	No	No	No	No	No	No	No	No	No	No	No	Yes	No	No	No	No	No	No	No	No	No
Most Wanted Pet	No	No	No	No	No	No	No	No	No	No	No	No	No	No	No	No	No	No	No	No	No	No	No	No	No	No	No	No	Yes	No	No	No	No	No	No	No	No	No
#Squad	No	No	No	No	No	No	No	No	No	No	No	No	No	No	No	No	No	No	No	No	No	No	No	No	No	No	No	No	Yes	No	No	No	No	No	No	No	No	No
Favorite Music Video	No	No	No	No	No	No	No	No	No	No	No	No	No	No	No	No	No	No	No	No	No	No	No	No	No	No	No	No	Yes	No	No	No	No	No	No	No	No	No
Favorite DJ/EDM Artist	No	No	No	No	No	No	No	No	No	No	No	No	No	No	No	No	No	No	No	No	No	No	No	No	No	No	No	No	Yes	No	No	No	No	No	No	No	No	No
Favorite Soundtrack	No	No	No	No	No	No	No	No	No	No	No	No	No	No	No	No	No	No	No	No	No	No	No	No	No	No	No	No	Yes	No	No	No	No	No	No	No	No	No
Favorite Viral Music Artist	No	No	No	No	No	No	No	No	No	No	No	No	No	No	No	No	No	No	No	No	No	No	No	No	No	No	No	No	Yes	No	No	No	No	No	No	No	No	No
Favorite Dance Trend	No	No	No	No	No	No	No	No	No	No	No	No	No	No	No	No	No	No	No	No	No	No	No	No	No	No	No	No	No	Yes	No	No	No	No	No	No	No	No
Favorite Funny YouTube Creator	No	No	No	No	No	No	No	No	No	No	No	No	No	No	No	No	No	No	No	No	No	No	No	No	No	No	No	No	No	Yes	No	No	No	No	No	No	No	No
Favorite Musical YouTube Creator	No	No	No	No	No	No	No	No	No	No	No	No	No	No	No	No	No	No	No	No	No	No	No	No	No	No	No	No	No	Yes	No	No	No	No	No	No	No	No
Favorite Instagram Pet	No	No	No	No	No	No	No	No	No	No	No	No	No	No	No	No	No	No	No	No	No	No	No	No	No	No	No	No	No	Yes	No	No	No	No	No	No	No	No
Favorite TV Host	No	No	No	No	No	No	No	No	No	No	No	No	No	No	No	No	No	No	No	No	No	No	No	No	No	No	No	No	No	No	Yes	Yes	No	No	No	No	No	No
Favorite TV Judges	No	No	No	No	No	No	No	No	No	No	No	No	No	No	No	No	No	No	No	No	No	No	No	No	No	No	No	No	No	No	Yes	No	No	No	No	No	No	No
Favorite Superhero	No	No	No	No	No	No	No	No	No	No	No	No	No	No	No	No	No	No	No	No	No	No	No	No	No	No	No	No	No	No	Yes	Yes	No	No	No	No	No	No
Favorite Gamer	No	No	No	No	No	No	No	No	No	No	No	No	No	No	No	No	No	No	No	No	No	No	No	No	No	No	No	No	No	No	Yes	Yes	No	No	No	Yes	Yes	No
How Do You Want to Help?	No	No	No	No	No	No	No	No	No	No	No	No	No	No	No	No	No	No	No	No	No	No	No	No	No	No	No	No	No	No	Yes	No	No	No	No	No	No	No
Favorite Social Star	No	No	No	No	No	No	No	No	No	No	No	No	No	No	No	No	No	No	No	No	No	No	No	No	No	No	No	No	No	No	Yes	Yes	Yes	Yes	Yes	Yes	Yes	Yes

== Ceremonies ==
Kids' Choice Awards ceremonies
#	Date	Venue	City	Host(s)	Ref.
1st	March 28 – April 18, 1987	Rated K: For Kids by Kids studio	New York City, New York	Matt Nespole; Rebecca Schwager; Mark Shanahan	
2nd	April 18, 1988	Universal Studios Hollywood	Universal City, California	Tony Danza; Brian Robbins; Dan Schneider; Debbie Gibson	
3rd	June 25, 1989	Universal Studios Hollywood	Universal City, California	Nicole Eggert; Wil Wheaton	
4th	April 23, 1990	Universal Studios Hollywood	Universal City, California	Dave Coulier; Candace Cameron; David Faustino	
5th	April 22, 1991			Corin Nemec	
6th	November 14, 1992	Universal Studios Hollywood	Universal City, California	Holly Robinson; Tori Spelling; Brian Austin Green	
7th	May 7, 1994	Pantages Theatre	Los Angeles, California	Candace Cameron; Joey Lawrence	
7th	May 7, 1994	Universal Studios Florida	Orlando, Florida	Marc Weiner	
8th	May 20, 1995	Barker Hangar	Santa Monica, California	Whitney Houston	
9th	May 11, 1996	Universal Studios Hollywood	Universal City, California	Whitney Houston	
9th	May 11, 1996	New York Harbor cruise	New York City, New York	Rosie O'Donnell	
10th	April 19, 1997	Grand Olympic Auditorium	Los Angeles, California	Rosie O'Donnell	
11th	April 4, 1998	Pauley Pavilion	Los Angeles, California	Rosie O'Donnell	
12th	May 1, 1999	Pauley Pavilion	Los Angeles, California	Rosie O'Donnell	
13th	April 15, 2000	Hollywood Bowl	Los Angeles, California	Rosie O'Donnell; David Arquette; LL Cool J; Mandy Moore; Frankie Muniz	
14th	April 21, 2001	Barker Hangar	Santa Monica, California	Rosie O'Donnell	
15th	April 20, 2002	Barker Hangar	Santa Monica, California	Rosie O'Donnell	
16th	April 12, 2003	Barker Hangar	Santa Monica, California	Rosie O'Donnell	
17th	April 3, 2004	Pauley Pavilion	Los Angeles, California	Mike Myers; Cameron Diaz	
18th	April 2, 2005	Pauley Pavilion	Los Angeles, California	Ben Stiller	
19th	April 1, 2006	Pauley Pavilion	Los Angeles, California	Jack Black	
20th	March 31, 2007	Pauley Pavilion	Los Angeles, California	Justin Timberlake	
21st	March 29, 2008	Pauley Pavilion	Los Angeles, California	Jack Black	
22nd	March 28, 2009	Pauley Pavilion	Los Angeles, California	Dwayne Johnson	
23rd	March 27, 2010	Pauley Pavilion	Los Angeles, California	Kevin James	
24th	April 2, 2011	Galen Center	Los Angeles, California	Jack Black	
25th	March 31, 2012	Galen Center	Los Angeles, California	Will Smith	
26th	March 23, 2013	Galen Center	Los Angeles, California	Josh Duhamel	
27th	March 29, 2014	Galen Center	Los Angeles, California	Mark Wahlberg	
28th	March 28, 2015	The Forum	Inglewood, California	Nick Jonas	
29th	March 12, 2016	The Forum	Inglewood, California	Blake Shelton	
30th	March 11, 2017	Galen Center	Los Angeles, California	John Cena	
31st	March 24, 2018	The Forum	Inglewood, California	John Cena	
32nd	March 23, 2019	Galen Center	Los Angeles, California	DJ Khaled	
33rd	May 2, 2020	Virtual show (Note: The ceremony was originally planned to be held at The Forum, but changed to a virtual ceremony due to the COVID-19 pandemic.)		Victoria Justice (Note: Chance the Rapper was originally set to host the ceremony before moving to a virtual ceremony.)	
34th	March 13, 2021	Barker Hangar (Note: The main stage for the 2021 ceremony was at the Barker Hangar, while a blimp 'traveled' to different destinations during the show including Stranger Things' Upside Down, Mars, Liza Koshy's house, and SpongeBob SquarePants' Bikini Bottom. Most presenters, winners, and performers appeared in-person, while others appeared virtually, including the audience.)	Santa Monica, California	Kenan Thompson	
35th	April 9, 2022	Barker Hangar	Santa Monica, California	Miranda Cosgrove; Rob Gronkowski	
36th	March 4, 2023	Microsoft Theater	Los Angeles, California	Nate Burleson; Charli D'Amelio	
37th	July 13, 2024	Barker Hangar	Santa Monica, California	SpongeBob SquarePants; Patrick Star; (Note: Tom Kenny and Bill Fagerbakke provided the voices of SpongeBob and Patrick.)	
38th	June 21, 2025	Barker Hangar	Santa Monica, California	Tyla	
39th	November 14, 2026	Television City	Los Angeles, California	Alex Warren	

=== Venues ===
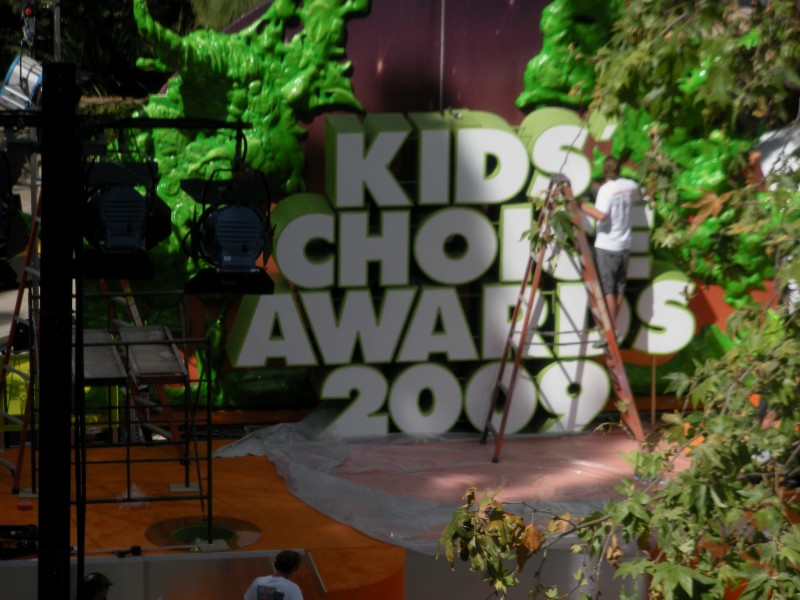
Finishing up with the "Orange Carpet" for the Kids' Choice Awards outside of Pauley Pavilion, UCLA campus

The Kids' Choice Awards are typically held in and around Southern California. Past ceremonies have been held at the Barker Hangar in Santa Monica, California, the Hollywood Bowl, the Grand Olympic Auditorium in Los Angeles, and Universal Studios Hollywood in Universal City, but mostly at Pauley Pavilion on the UCLA campus. After renovations to Pauley beginning in 2011, the show was moved to the Galen Center at USC; it was expected to be a temporary home, but the network retained Galen for the 2012–2014 ceremonies due to the construction of the Meyer and Renee Luskin Conference and Guest Center, making it difficult to have the "Orange Carpet"; the smaller Kids' Choice Sports had its first ceremony in 2014 at Pauley. For the 2015 and 2016 shows, the ceremony occurred at the remodeled Forum in Inglewood, California. Between the 2017 and 2019 shows, the venue alternated between the Galen Center and The Forum. The 2023 ceremony was held at the Microsoft Theater. The 2026 ceremony will be held at Television City.

The 2020 awards, previously scheduled for March 22, were postponed due to the COVID-19 pandemic; the ceremony was later moved to May 2 to be held virtually. The 2020 show was originally planned to serve as a tie-in with Nickelodeon's SlimeFest event.

=== Multiple year hosts ===
The ceremony has been hosted multiple times by five individuals: Candace Cameron who hosted in 1990 and 1994, Whitney Houston who hosted consecutively in 1995 and 1996, Rosie O'Donnell who hosted consecutively from 1996 through 2003 (co-hosted with Houston in 1996 and with four co-hosts in 2000), Jack Black who hosted in 2006, 2008 and 2011, and John Cena who hosted consecutively in 2017 and 2018.

== Special awards ==
For these awards, the trophy awarded to the recipient may be a different color than Nickelodeon orange.

=== The Hall of Fame Award ===
The Hall of Fame Award was a gold version of the blimp award from 1991 to 2000, and was presented to those whose accomplishments, fame, and popularity set them above everyone else. Initially, the award was chosen by the kids from a slate of nominees. Actors, athletes, and singers were all eligible for the award, with ballots containing nominees from multiple categories.

Year	Winner(s)
1991	Paula Abdul
1992	Arnold Schwarzenegger
1994	Michael Jordan
1995	Boyz II Men
1996	Tim Allen
1997	Will Smith
1998	Tia & Tamera Mowry
1999	Jonathan Taylor Thomas
2000	Rosie O'Donnell

=== The Wannabe Award ===
The Wannabe Award was a silver version of the blimp award from 2001 to 2008, and was presented to the best celebrity role model or inspiration (or the person whom the kids want to be like). The winner was determined prior to the awards without voter input. The only person to have won the Wannabe award and the Hall of Fame award is Will Smith.

Year	Winner
2001	Tom Cruise
2002	Janet Jackson
2003	Will Smith
2004	Adam Sandler
2005	Queen Latifah
2006	Chris Rock
2007	Ben Stiller
2008	Cameron Diaz

=== The Big Help Award ===
The Big Green Help Award (later titled as The Big Help Award) was an award presented to a person who goes above and beyond to help the environment. It is based on Nickelodeon's The Big Help initiative. The award was originally green when first awarded in 2009, but later changed to silver along with a name change of the award the following years.

Year	Winner
2009	Leonardo DiCaprio
2010	Michelle Obama
2011	Justin Timberlake
2012	Taylor Swift

=== Lifetime Achievement Award ===
The Nickelodeon Lifetime Achievement Award is a golden version of the blimp award. In 2023, a normal orange-colored blimp award was used.

In 2014, the award was given to television producer Dan Schneider, who created multiple shows at Nickelodeon. During the presentation of his award, Schneider was joined onstage by cast members of his shows including Kenan & Kel, Drake & Josh, Zoey 101, iCarly, Victorious, and Sam & Cat. In 2023, the award was given to Transformers character Optimus Prime. In his acceptance speech, Prime proclaimed for the award to, "...seal the bond between humans, Maximals, and Autobots, as we fight together to protect the planet."

Year	Winner
2014	Dan Schneider
2023	Optimus Prime

=== Legend Award ===
The award was originally introduced in the Kids' Choice Sports ceremony, but has since carried over to the main ceremony.

Year	Winner
2014	David Beckham
2015	Derek Jeter
2016	Kobe Bryant
2017	Michael Phelps
2018	Danica Patrick
2019	Dwyane Wade
2024	Serena Williams

=== Generation Change Award ===
The Generation Change Award is presented to those who have worked to bring positive changes for the new generation of kids. The award was originally introduced in the 2019 Kids' Choice Sports ceremony, but has since carried over to the main ceremony.

Year	Winner
2019	Megan Rapinoe
2020	LeBron James
2021	Kamala Harris

=== King of Comedy Award ===
Year	Winner
2023	Adam Sandler
2025	Jack Black
2026	Chris Pratt

=== ICON Award ===
Year	Winner
2025	Rihanna

== Kids' Choice Sports ==
From 2014 to 2019, Nickelodeon presented Kids' Choice Sports, honoring kids' favorite athletes, teams, and sports moments from the year. Michael Strahan produced and hosted the inaugural ceremony.

=== Ceremonies ===
Year	Host(s)	Location
2014	Michael Strahan	Pauley Pavilion
2015	Russell Wilson	Pauley Pavilion
2016	Russell Wilson	Pauley Pavilion
2017	Russell Wilson	Pauley Pavilion
2018	Chris Paul	Barker Hangar
2019	Michael Strahan	Barker Hangar

== Slimed celebrities ==
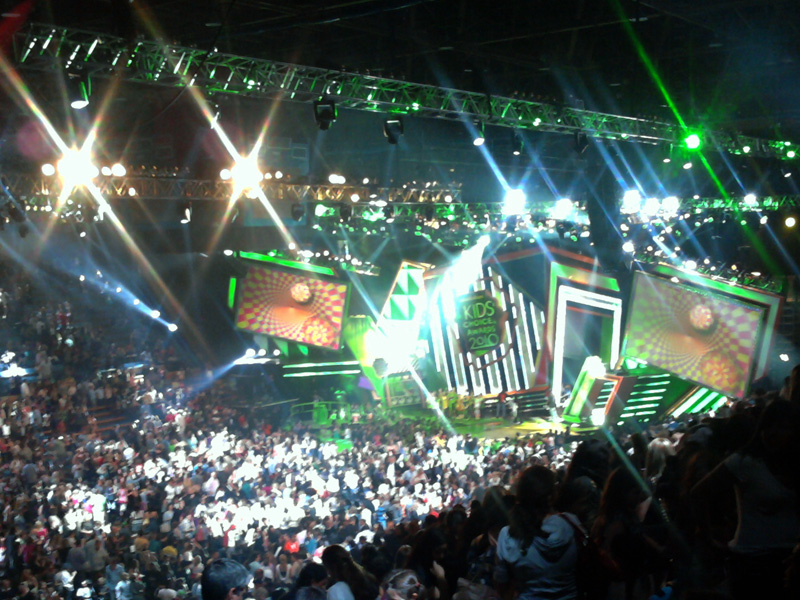
The final slime at the 2010 Kids' Choice Awards

During a ceremony, sometimes a celebrity presenter or award winner might not know when they are going to be slimed onstage or offstage, though as the years went on, getting slimed became more of an honor, and less of a comedic humiliation akin to the early Nickelodeon series You Can't Do That on Television, from whence the concept originated. Hosts of the show have also been slimed, and occasionally celebrities not attending the awards have been slimed via video segment, such as when Rosie O'Donnell tricked Melissa Joan Hart into getting slimed on the set of Sabrina the Teenage Witch in 2001, or when Amanda Seyfried and Josh Hutcherson were slimed at a KCA watch party in 2013. Celebrities sitting in the audience are also fair game for being slimed, as Mandy Moore first learned in 2007, and Halle Berry later found out in 2012.

Below is a list of all the celebrities that have been slimed over the past years at the Kids' Choice Awards.

Year	Slimed Celebrity(ies)
1988	Les Lye
1989	Bill Kirchenbauer
1990	Wil Wheaton
1991	Corin Nemec; Bart Simpson (animated segment)
1992	Jonathan Taylor Thomas; Zachery Ty Bryan; Taran Noah Smith
1994	James Earl Jones
1995	Mark Curry
1996	Queen Latifah
1997	Rosie O'Donnell
1998	Sean "Diddy" Combs
1999	Randy Savage; Chilli; Stephanie Bellars
2000	Will Smith
2001	Melissa Joan Hart; *NSYNC; Tom Cruise; Rosie O'Donnell
2002	Pink; Adam Sandler
2003	Jim Carrey; Rosie O'Donnell
2004	Mary-Kate and Ashley Olsen; Mike Myers
2005	Will Ferrell; Johnny Depp; Ben Stiller
2006	Robin Williams; Jack Black
2007	Chris Tucker; Jackie Chan; Mandy Moore; Steve Carell; Tobey Maguire; Vince Vaughn; Justin Timberlake
2008	Harrison Ford; Brendan Fraser; Orlando Bloom; Jack Black
2009	Jesse McCartney; Hugh Jackman; Sandra Bullock; Jonas Brothers; Dwayne Johnson
2010	Jackson Rathbone; Jerry Trainor; Katy Perry; Fred Figglehorn; Tina Fey; Steve Carell; Kevin James
2011	Russell Brand; Rico Rodriguez; Snoop Dogg; Kaley Cuoco; Heidi Klum; Jason Segel; Josh Duhamel; Jim Carrey; Jack Black; Po (animated segment); Blu and Jewel (animated segment)
2012	Halle Berry; Chris Colfer; Taylor Lautner; The Miz; The Big Show; Jeff Sutphen; Santino Marella; Justin Bieber; Will Smith
2013	Pitbull; Dwight Howard; Neil Patrick Harris; Sandra Bullock; Amanda Seyfried; Josh Hutcherson; Nick Cannon; Josh Duhamel
2014	Pharrell Williams; Kaley Cuoco; Jack Reynor; Austin Mahone; Cody Simpson; David Blaine; Shaun White; Jukka Hildén; Dave England; Mark Wahlberg
2015	Jesse Tyler Ferguson; Sarah Hyland; Ariel Winter; Nolan Gould; Rico Rodriguez; Shawn Mendes; Cast of The Thundermans; Josh Gad; Nick Jonas; 5 Seconds of Summer
2016	John Stamos; Fifth Harmony; Jason Sudeikis; Josh Gad; Cameron Dallas; Blake Shelton
2017	Demi Lovato; Chris Pratt; Kevin Hart; John Cena
2018	Liza Koshy; Heidi Klum; Mel B JoJo Siwa; Laurie Hernandez; Barbie (animated segment); Shawn Mendes; John Cena
2019	Chris Pratt; Will Smith; David Dobrik; Josh Peck; Janelle Monáe; Adam Sandler; DJ Khaled
2020	JoJo Siwa; David Dobrik; Victoria Justice
2021	Charli D'Amelio; Lin-Manuel Miranda; Robert Downey Jr. Liza Koshy; Kenan Thompson
2022	MrBeast; Jack Harlow; Charlie Puth; Dixie D'Amelio; Kid Cudi; Cast of Danger Force; Cast of Warped! Miranda Cosgrove; Rob Gronkowski
2023	Bebe Rexha; Chris Pine; Michelle Rodriguez; Dwayne Johnson; Adam Sandler; Melissa McCarthy; Lil Uzi Vert; Landon Barker; Cast of Teenage Mutant Ninja Turtles: Mutant Mayhem; Dixie D'Amelio; Heidi D'Amelio; Marc D'Amelio; Charli D'Amelio; Nate Burleson; Mia Burleson
2024	Reneé Rapp; Jack Black; Jelly Roll; The Kid Laroi; Henry Golding
2025	Alex Warren; Jack Griffo; Kira Kosarin mgk Salish Matter; Jack Black; Katseye; Kel Mitchell; Tyla
2026	Jamie Miller; Alysa Liu; Sofi Tukker; Jackson Olson; Stella Lefty; Jerry Trainor; Chris Pratt; Ashe; Teyana Taylor; Alex Warren

== Slime stunts ==
Beginning in 2002, the show began its annual World Record Slime Stunts. Olympians, extreme sports stars and daredevils participated in special stunts performed live on national television—often landing into the trademark green slime.

Year	Celebrity (ies)	Stunt synopsis
2002	Dave Mirra	The BMX pro-biker broke his own record for a double back flip on a BMX bike and landed in a 5,000 gallon tank of green slime.
2003	Tony Hawk	The skateboarding champion skateboarded into an 11,000 gallon tank of green slime.
2004	Mat Hoffman	The BMX pro performed the "World Record Skydiving Bike Jump" skydiving 14,000 feet in a lakefull of green slime.
2005	Donald Trump/David Spitz Jr.	From New York, The Apprentice host "fired" human cannonball David Spitz Jr. into the air, where he landed in a net laced with green slime.
2006	Ryan St. Onge	In a live remote from the Utah Olympic Park in Park City, Utah, the U.S. Olympic Freestyle Aerial Skier skied into 10,000 gallons of green slime.
2007	Ron Jones	Bungee jumping into a pool of slime.
2008	Jack Black; Orlando Bloom	Kids Choice 2008 had many slime stunts all hosted by professional boxer Laila Ali. Depending on the outcome of the stunt, a certain amount of green slime was added to a slime vat backstage which was referred to throughout as the "Slime Meter". The slime was used later on at the end of the show, in what was supposedly the "World's Longest Celebrity Sliming", in which Orlando Bloom joined host Jack Black to be slimed for one solid minute. Host Black even made a remark about how the grand total of 27 tons of slime could fit in a vat that only held 25 tons.
2008	Akon	In the first stunt, affectionately called the "Slime-o-Lition Derby", the pop star had 45 seconds to ride the Kids' Choice Bobble Head Kart. The choices were the shark-themed "Jaws Jalopy", a hot dog-shaped "Weiner Wagon" and the winner, the Jack Black Bobble Head Kart which was essentially a go-kart with a giant Jack Black head on the top. Akon successfully completed the course adding 10 tons of slime to the vat, "plus 5 for finishing" bringing the total to 15 tons.
2008	Usher	The famous R&B singer performed the second stunt manning a "slime hose", firing at a sumo wrestler and propelling him in costume along a long platform. The amount of slime added to the vat was determined by how far the "human target" was propelled by the spray of slime. Viewers voting online picked the sumo wrestler over his competitor, the Scuba diver. The "human target" was launched all the way to the 5-ton mark bringing the total of slime in the vat to 20 tons.
2008	Heidi Klum	The last stunt was performed by the supermodel or as host Black called her "Heidi the Human Dart". Klum was attached by a harness to a long cable, allowing her to swing freely in which she did. Armed with a pad of spikes, she swung between her platform and what was a trampoline-like wall covered in slime balloons. For every slime balloon Klum popped in 30 seconds, one more ton of slime was added to the vat. Kids voted online to determine exactly what type of spike pad Klum would use to pop the balloons. The choices were the hand-worn "mittens" and the winner the "butt pad" which unanimously beat out the mittens. Klum popped 7 balloons on the wall, adding 7 more tons of slime to the vat and bringing the total of slime in the vat to 27 tons.
2009	Will Ferrell	The comedian-actor slid down a slime-covered slide that was placed on top of Janss Steps on the UCLA campus, on a luge head first into a pool of slime.
2010	Apolo Anton Ohno	Two stunts were featured at the 2010 awards. First, eight-time Olympic medalist Ohno was catapulted into slime by slingshot with the help of WWE wrestler John Cena.
2010	Jerry Trainor; Jackson Rathbone; Nicola Peltz	For the second stunt, to promote The Last Airbender stars Peltz and Rathbone along with iCarly star Trainor were featured in a bending-slime event. Since Peltz's character is a "water-bender", she bent the slime towards Trainor and Rathbone.
2011	Kelvin Ramer	Ramer's monster truck, rebodied and relivered for the event, jumps over a 50-foot Nickelodeon blimp award into a pool of slime. It was hosted by Paul "The Big Show" Wight who said that it was the most dangerous Kids' Choice slime stunt ever.
2012	Big Show and The Miz	A slime themed wrestling match between Big Show and The Miz. When either The Big Show or The Miz hits the special cannons on each corner of the ring, slime shoots out and covers the audience. The Big Show defeated The Miz when he threw him over the ring and into a pool of slime. Afterwards, The Big Show was slimed for his ultimate reward.
2014	Dave England & Jukka Hildén	Kids got to pick between three slime stunts and the one with the highest number of votes would win. It was between an Ultimate Slime Rodeo, a High Speed Bathtub Race, or a Slippery Obstacle Course. The Ultimate Slime Rodeo won as both Dave and Jukka rode on electronic riding horses that had slime hoses in their mouths and whoever held on the longest would win. Dave eventually held on the longest and won.
2015	Cast of The Thundermans	An online vote was held during the show, in which kids chose between The Thundermans, Nicky, Ricky, Dicky & Dawn, and Bella and the Bulldogs. The cast of the show with the most votes would go through a car wash with slime being fired at every direction.
2016	Bethany Mota & Cameron Dallas	As part of the ceremony's website/app voting system set up for the show, kids voted for the best internet personality. They had to choose between YouTuber Bethany Mota and YouTuber, Viner, TikToker, and actor Cameron Dallas. Both of them went on to partake in the Slime Soakers stunt but only one of them was to get slimed, which the kids had to vote for on Nick.com and in the Nick app. Towards the end of the show, the winner, Cameron Dallas, was revealed and proceeded to get slimed.
2020	Astronauts	ESA Astronaut Col. Luca Parmitano and NASA Astronaut Christina Koch opened and played with the first ever slime in space inside the International Space Station.
