= Kids' Choice Award for Favorite Video Game =

Television awards show

This is a list of winners at the Nickelodeon Kids' Choice for Favorite Video Game, given at the Nickelodeon Kids' Choice Awards.

== Winners and nominees ==
Since the 2020s, The Kids' Choice Award has been won eight times by games in the Just Dance series, and four times by Minecraft.

Winners are listed first, highlighted in yellow and boldface, and indicated with a double dagger (‡).

=== 1990s ===
Year	Video Game
1995	**Donkey Kong Country** ‡
1995	Aladdin
1995	NBA Jam
1996	**Donkey Kong Country** ‡
1996	Ms. Pac-Man
1996	Tiny Toon Adventures: Buster Busts Loose!
1996	X-Men
1997	**NBA Jam T.E.** ‡
1997	Diddy's Kong-Quest
1997	Super Mario 64
1997	Toy Story
1998	**Super Mario 64** ‡
1998	Diddy's Kong-Quest
1998	Super Mario World 2: Yoshi's Island
1998	Star Fox 64
1999	**Super Mario 64** ‡
1999	Crash Bandicoot
1999	The Legend of Zelda: Ocarina of Time
1999	Yoshi's Story

=== 2000s ===
Year	Video Game
2000	**Pokémon** (Note: The 2000 award was given to the entire Pokémon series instead of just one game. Some sources state that Pokémon Yellow won the award.)‡
2000	Donkey Kong 64
2000	Mario Party
2000	Toy Story 2: Buzz Lightyear to the Rescue
2001	**Tony Hawk's Pro Skater 2** ‡
2001	Crash Bash
2001	Frogger 2: Swampy's Revenge
2001	Pokémon Gold and Silver
2002	**Mario Kart: Super Circuit** ‡
2002	Backyard Basketball
2002	Crash Bandicoot: The Wrath of Cortex
2002	Harry Potter and the Sorcerer's Stone
2003	**SpongeBob SquarePants: Revenge of the Flying Dutchman** ‡
2003	Harry Potter and the Chamber of Secrets
2003	Mario Party 4
2003	Spider-Man
2004	**SpongeBob SquarePants: Battle for Bikini Bottom** ‡
2004	Finding Nemo
2004	Harry Potter: Quidditch World Cup
2004	Super Mario Advance 4
2005	**Shrek 2** ‡
2005	Scooby Doo 2: Monsters Unleashed
2005	Shark Tale
2005	Spider-Man 2
2006	**Madagascar: Operation Penguin** ‡
2006	The Incredibles: Rise of the Underminer
2006	Madden NFL 06
2006	Mario Superstar Baseball
2007	**SpongeBob SquarePants: Creature from the Krusty Krab** ‡
2007	Madden NFL 07
2007	Mario Kart DS
2007	New Super Mario Bros.
2008	**Madden NFL 08** ‡
2008	Dance Dance Revolution: Hottest Party
2008	Guitar Hero III
2008	High School Musical: Sing It!
2009	**Guitar Hero World Tour** ‡
2009	Mario Kart Wii
2009	Mario Super Sluggers
2009	Rock Band 2

=== 2010s ===
Year	Video Game
2010	**Mario Kart Wii** ‡
2010	The Legend of Zelda: Spirit Tracks
2010	Wii Fit
2010	Wii Sports Resort
2011	**Just Dance 2** ‡
2011	Mario vs. Donkey Kong: Mini-Land Mayhem!
2011	Need for Speed: Hot Pursuit
2011	Super Mario Galaxy 2
2012	**Just Dance 3** ‡
2012	Lego Star Wars: The Complete Saga
2012	Mario Kart 7
2012	Super Mario Galaxy
2013	**Just Dance 4** ‡
2013	Mario Kart 7
2013	Skylanders Giants
2013	Wii Sports
2014	**Just Dance 2014** ‡
2014	Angry Birds Star Wars
2014	Disney Infinity
2014	Minecraft
2015 (Most Addicting Game)	**Minecraft** ‡
2015 (Most Addicting Game)	Angry Birds Transformers
2015 (Most Addicting Game)	Candy Crush Saga
2015 (Most Addicting Game)	Disney Infinity 2.0
2015 (Most Addicting Game)	Mario Kart 8
2015 (Most Addicting Game)	Skylanders: Trap Team
2016	**Just Dance 2016** ‡
2016	Disney Infinity 3.0
2016	Minecraft: Story Mode
2016	Skylanders: SuperChargers
2016	SpongeBob HeroPants
2016	Super Mario Maker
2017	**Just Dance 2017** ‡
2017	Lego Marvel's Avengers
2017	Lego Star Wars: The Force Awakens
2017	Minecraft: Story Mode
2017	Paper Mario: Color Splash
2017	Pokémon Sun and Moon
2018	**Just Dance 2018** ‡
2018	Lego Marvel Super Heroes 2
2018	Mario Kart 8 Deluxe
2018	Minecraft: Java Edition
2018	Star Wars Battlefront II
2018	Super Mario Odyssey
2019	**Just Dance 2019** ‡
2019	Lego The Incredibles
2019	Marvel's Spider-Man
2019	Super Smash Bros. Ultimate
2019	Super Mario Party

=== 2020s ===
Year	Video Game
2020	**Minecraft** ‡
2020	Fortnite
2020	Mario Kart Tour
2020	Super Smash Bros. Ultimate
2021	**Among Us** ‡
2021	Animal Crossing: New Horizons
2021	Fortnite
2021	Minecraft
2021	Pokémon Go
2021	Roblox
2022	**Minecraft** ‡
2022	Brookhaven
2022	Just Dance 2022
2022	Mario Party Superstars
2023	**Minecraft** ‡
2023	Adopt Me!
2023	Brookhaven
2023	Just Dance 2023
2023	Mario + Rabbids Sparks of Hope
2023	Pokémon Scarlet and Violet
2024	**Roblox** ‡
2024	Just Dance 2024
2024	Madden NFL 24
2024	Minecraft
2024	Super Mario Bros. Wonder
2024	The Legend of Zelda: Tears of the Kingdom
2025	**Roblox** ‡
2025	Fortnite
2025	Just Dance 2025 Edition
2025	Madden NFL 25
2025	Minecraft
2025	Super Mario Party Jamboree
2026	**Roblox** ‡
2026	Among Us
2026	Avatar Legends: The Fighting Game
2026	Fortnite
2026	Minecraft
2026	Super Mario Bros. Wonder

=== Favorite App ===
"Favorite App" was a category for popular mobile games. It existed in 2013 and 2014 before it was merged into "Favorite Video Game" (renamed Most Addicting Game for one year) in 2015.

Year	App
2013	**Temple Run** ‡
2013	Angry Birds
2013	Fruit Ninja
2013	Minecraft
2014	**Despicable Me: Minion Rush** ‡
2014	Angry Birds Star Wars II
2014	Candy Crush Saga
2014	Temple Run

== Multiple nominations and awards ==
During the early years of the category, nominated games did not have to be from the year before the ceremony to be nominated, and often games that had already been nominated or won the award in years past could be re-nominated. Super Mario 64, for example, was nominated in the category three years in a row (1997, 1998 and 1999), winning in the latter two years. From 2000 onwards, games had to be released the year before the ceremony to be eligible for nomination, but this has been loosened in recent years for Minecraft and Roblox.

As of the 2024 ceremony, Minecraft holds the record for most wins in the category for a single game, at 4. The game's wins occurred in 2015 (when the category was known as "Most Addicting Game"), 2020, 2022 and 2023. Minecraft, Donkey Kong Country (in the award's first two years) and Super Mario 64 are the only games to have won the award in consecutive years. Minecraft has also been nominated for Favorite Video Game in 2014, 2015 and every year since 2020; the main game was also nominated for Favorite Mobile Game in 2013. Minecraft: Story Mode was nominated in place of the main game in 2016 and 2017, while the Java version of the game was nominated separately in 2018.

The Just Dance series of games has won the category a record total of 8 times from 2011 to 2014 and 2016 to 2019, winning every edition in which a Just Dance game was nominated during that span. The series was also nominated from 2022 to 2025, for a total of 11 nominations.

Roblox, as a game development platform, has had its games nominated separately in lieu of the platform as a whole. Brookhaven RP was nominated in 2022 and 2023, with Adopt Me! also nominated in the latter year, marking the only time that two games from the same platform were nominated for Favorite Video Game.
