= Kids' Choice Award for Favorite Cartoon =

Nickelodeon award

The Nickelodeon Kids' Choice for Favorite Cartoon is an award category given at the Nickelodeon Kids' Choice Awards. This list also includes other information and other winners and nominees for the specific cartoon or relations to it. Although animated shows of any network can be nominated and win the award, all winners have been from Nickelodeon except for The Simpsons, which won in 2002. SpongeBob SquarePants has the most awards by a winning streak with 17 wins (22 overall) and has won the award every year since it was first nominated in 2003, except for in 2008. The only show ever to beat SpongeBob SquarePants was Avatar: The Last Airbender in 2008 on its first and only nomination.

== 1990s ==
Year	Cartoon	Network	Other Info	Other awards
1995	Doug	Nickelodeon	First win and nomination, first Nicktoon win and nomination	
1995	Aladdin	CBS/The Disney Channel	First nomination	Disney's Aladdin was nominated for "Favorite Video Game"
1995	Animaniacs	Fox Kids	First nomination	
1996	Rugrats	Nickelodeon	First win and nomination	
1996	Animaniacs	Kids' WB	Second nomination	
1996	Doug	Nickelodeon	First loss	
1996	The Simpsons	Fox	First nomination	
1997	Rugrats	Nickelodeon	Win, 2nd time in a row	
1997	Ace Ventura: Pet Detective	CBS	First nomination	
1997	Animaniacs	Kids' WB	Third nomination	
1997	The Simpsons	Fox	Second nomination	
1998	Rugrats	Nickelodeon	Win, 3rd time in a row	
1998	Hey Arnold!	Nickelodeon	First nomination	
1998	King of the Hill	Fox	First nomination	
1998	The Simpsons	Fox	Third nomination	
1999	Rugrats	Nickelodeon	Win, 4th time in a row	The Rugrats Movie won "Favorite Movie"
1999	CatDog	Nickelodeon	First nomination	
1999	Men in Black: The Series	Kids' WB	First nomination	
1999	The Simpsons	Fox	Fourth nomination	

== 2000s ==
Year	Cartoon	Network	Other Info	Other awards
2000	Rugrats	Nickelodeon	Win, 5th time in a row	
2000	Pokémon	Kids' WB	First nomination, first anime nomination for Favorite Cartoon	Pokémon Yellow won "Favorite Video Game"; Pokémon: The First Movie was nominated for "Favorite Movie".
2000	The Simpsons	Fox	Fifth nomination	
2000	CatDog	Nickelodeon	Second nomination	
2001	Rugrats	Nickelodeon	Win, 6th time in a row	Susan Sarandon won "Favorite Voice From an Animated Movie".
2001	Hey Arnold!	Nickelodeon	Second nomination	
2001	The Powerpuff Girls	Cartoon Network	First nomination	
2001	The Simpsons	Fox	Sixth nomination	
2002	The Simpsons	Fox	First win, first and only non-Nicktoon win, seventh nomination overall	
2002	Hey Arnold!	Nickelodeon	Third nomination	
2002	Rugrats	Nickelodeon	First loss, became 3rd most nominated	
2002	Scooby-Doo	Cartoon Network	First nomination	
2003	SpongeBob SquarePants	Nickelodeon	First win and nomination	SpongeBob SquarePants: Revenge of the Flying Dutchman won "Favorite Video Game"
2003	Rugrats	Nickelodeon	Last nomination for original series	
2003	The Simpsons	Fox	First loss after first win, eighth nomination	
2003	Kim Possible	Disney Channel	First nomination	
2004	SpongeBob SquarePants	Nickelodeon	Win, 2nd time in a row	SpongeBob SquarePants: Battle for Bikini Bottom won "Favorite Video Game"
2004	The Fairly OddParents	Nickelodeon	First nomination	
2004	The Proud Family	Disney Channel	First nomination	
2004	The Simpsons	Fox	Ninth nomination	
2005	SpongeBob SquarePants	Nickelodeon	Win, 3rd time in a row	
2005	Ed, Edd n Eddy	Cartoon Network	First nomination	
2005	The Fairly OddParents	Nickelodeon	Second nomination	
2005	The Simpsons	Fox	Tenth nomination	
2006	SpongeBob SquarePants	Nickelodeon	Win, 4th time in a row	
2006	The Adventures of Jimmy Neutron, Boy Genius	Nickelodeon	First nomination	
2006	The Fairly OddParents	Nickelodeon	Third nomination	
2006	The Simpsons	Fox	Broke record for most nominated, eleventh nomination overall	
2007	SpongeBob SquarePants	Nickelodeon	Win, 5th time in a row	SpongeBob SquarePants: Creature from the Krusty Krab won "Favorite Video Game"
2007	The Fairly OddParents	Nickelodeon	Fourth nomination	
2007	The Adventures of Jimmy Neutron, Boy Genius	Nickelodeon	Second nomination	
2007	The Simpsons	Fox	Twelfth nomination	
2008	Avatar: The Last Airbender	Nickelodeon	First and only win and nomination	
2008	The Simpsons	Fox	Thirteenth nomination	The Simpsons Movie was nominated for "Favorite Animated Movie"
2008	Ed, Edd n Eddy	Cartoon Network	Second nomination	
2008	SpongeBob SquarePants	Nickelodeon	Only year without win to date, sixth nomination	
2009	SpongeBob SquarePants	Nickelodeon	First win after first loss, seventh nomination	
2009	The Fairly OddParents	Nickelodeon	Becomes 4th most nominated	
2009	Phineas and Ferb	Disney Channel	First nomination	
2009	The Simpsons	Fox	Fourteenth nomination	

== 2010s ==
Year	Cartoon	Network	Other Info	Other awards
2010	SpongeBob SquarePants	Nickelodeon	Win, 2nd time in a row (7th of all time), eighth nomination	
2010	The Penguins of Madagascar	Nickelodeon	First nomination	
2010	Phineas and Ferb	Disney Channel/Disney XD	Second nomination	
2010	The Simpsons	Fox	Fifteenth nomination	
2011	SpongeBob SquarePants	Nickelodeon	Win, 3rd time in a row (8th of all time), ninth nomination, Broke record for 2nd most nominated	
2011	The Penguins of Madagascar	Nickelodeon	Second nomination	
2011	Phineas and Ferb	Disney Channel/Disney XD	Third nomination	
2011	Scooby-Doo! Mystery Incorporated	Cartoon Network	First nomination for this series, second nomination for the whole franchise	
2012	SpongeBob SquarePants	Nickelodeon	Win, 4th time in a row (9th of all time), tenth nomination	
2012	Kung Fu Panda: Legends of Awesomeness	Nickelodeon	First nomination	Kung Fu Panda 2 was nominated for "Favorite Animated Movie"
2012	Phineas and Ferb	Disney Channel/Disney XD	Eighth nomination	
2012	Scooby-Doo! Mystery Incorporated	Cartoon Network	Second nomination for this series, third nomination for the whole franchise	
2013	SpongeBob SquarePants	Nickelodeon	Win, 5th time in a row (10th of all time), eleventh nomination	
2013	The Fairly OddParents	Nickelodeon	Fifth nomination	
2013	Phineas and Ferb	Disney Channel/Disney XD	Becomes 5th most nominated, Fifth nomination as well	
2013	Tom and Jerry	Cartoon Network	First and Only nomination	
2014	SpongeBob SquarePants	Nickelodeon	Win, 6th time in a row (11th of all time), twelfth nomination	Patrick Star won "Favorite Animated Animal Sidekick"
2014	Teenage Mutant Ninja Turtles	Nickelodeon	First nomination for the 2012 series, 1st nomination for the franchise	
2014	Phineas and Ferb	Disney Channel/Disney XD	Sixth nomination	Perry the Platypus was nominated for "Favorite Animated Animal Sidekick"
2014	Adventure Time	Cartoon Network	First nomination	
2015	SpongeBob SquarePants	Nickelodeon	Win, 7th time in a row (12th of all time), thirteenth nomination	The SpongeBob Movie: Sponge Out of Water was nominated for "Favorite Animated Movie"
2015	Adventure Time	Cartoon Network	Second nomination	
2015	Phineas and Ferb	Disney Channel/Disney XD	Seventh nomination	
2015	Teenage Mutant Ninja Turtles	Nickelodeon	Second nomination for the 2012 series, 2nd nomination for the franchise	Teenage Mutant Ninja Turtles was nominated for "Favorite Movie".
2015	Teen Titans Go!	Cartoon Network	First nomination	
2015	The Fairly OddParents	Nickelodeon	Last nomination	
2016	SpongeBob SquarePants	Nickelodeon	Win, 8th time in a row (13th of all time), fourteenth nomination	SpongeBob HeroPants was nominated for "Favorite Video Game"
2016	ALVINNN!!! and the Chipmunks	Nickelodeon	First nomination	Alvin and the Chipmunks: The Road Chip was nominated for "Favorite Movie"
2016	Gravity Falls	Disney Channel/Disney XD	First and only nomination	
2016	Ninjago: Masters of Spinjitzu	Cartoon Network	First nomination	
2016	Phineas and Ferb	Disney Channel/Disney XD	Eighth nomination	
2016	Steven Universe	Cartoon Network	First and only nomination	
2016	Teen Titans Go!	Cartoon Network	Second nomination	
2016	The Amazing World of Gumball	Cartoon Network	First nomination	
2017	SpongeBob SquarePants	Nickelodeon	Win, 9th time in a row (14th of all time), fifteenth nomination	
2017	ALVINNN!!! and the Chipmunks	Nickelodeon	Second nomination	
2017	Teen Titans Go!	Cartoon Network	Third nomination	
2017	Teenage Mutant Ninja Turtles	Nickelodeon	Third nomination for 2012 series, 3rd nomination for franchise	Teenage Mutant Ninja Turtles: Out of the Shadows was nominated for "Favorite Movie"
2017	The Amazing World of Gumball	Cartoon Network	Second nomination	
2017	The Loud House	Nickelodeon	First nomination	
2018	SpongeBob SquarePants	Nickelodeon	Win, 10th time in a row (15th of all time), sixteenth nomination	
2018	ALVINNN!!! and the Chipmunks	Nickelodeon	Third nomination	
2018	The Loud House	Nickelodeon	Second nomination	
2018	The Simpsons	Fox	First nomination since 2010, 16th nomination overall	
2018	Teen Titans Go!	Cartoon Network	Fourth nomination	
2018	Teenage Mutant Ninja Turtles	Nickelodeon	Fourth and final nomination for 2012 series, 4th nomination for franchise	
2019	SpongeBob SquarePants	Nickelodeon	Win, 11th time in a row (16th of all time), seventeenth nomination	
2019	ALVINNN!!! and the Chipmunks	Nickelodeon	Fourth nomination	
2019	The Boss Baby: Back in Business	Netflix	First nomination	
2019	The Loud House	Nickelodeon	Third nomination	
2019	Rise of the Teenage Mutant Ninja Turtles	Nickelodeon	First nomination for series, 5th nomination for franchise	
2019	Teen Titans Go!	Cartoon Network	Fifth nomination	

== 2020s ==
Year	Cartoon	Network	Other Info	Other awards
2020	SpongeBob SquarePants	Nickelodeon	Win, 12th time in a row (17th of all time), eighteenth nomination	
2020	ALVINNN!!! and the Chipmunks	Nickelodeon	Fifth nomination	
2020	Teen Titans Go!	Cartoon Network	Sixth nomination	
2020	The Amazing World of Gumball	Cartoon Network	Third nomination	
2020	The Loud House	Nickelodeon	Fourth nomination	
2020	The Simpsons	Fox	Seventeenth nomination	
2021	SpongeBob SquarePants	Nickelodeon	Win, 13th time in a row (18th of all time), nineteenth nomination	
2021	ALVINNN!!! and the Chipmunks	Nickelodeon	Last nomination	
2021	The Boss Baby: Back in Business	Netflix	Second nomination	
2021	Lego Jurassic World: Legend of Isla Nublar	Nickelodeon	First and only nomination	
2021	The Loud House	Nickelodeon	Fifth nomination	
2021	Teen Titans Go!	Cartoon Network	Seventh nomination	
2022	SpongeBob SquarePants	Nickelodeon	Win, 14th time in a row (19th of all time), twentieth nomination	The SpongeBob Movie: Sponge on the Run was nominated for Favorite Animated Movie; Awkwafina, Tom Kenny and Keanu Reeves were nominated for "Favorite Voice from an Animated Movie"
2022	Jurassic World Camp Cretaceous	Netflix	First nomination	
2022	Looney Tunes Cartoons	HBO Max	Only nomination	
2022	The Loud House	Nickelodeon	Sixth nomination	
2022	The Smurfs	Nickelodeon	First nomination	
2022	Teen Titans Go!	Cartoon Network	Eighth nomination	
2023	SpongeBob SquarePants	Nickelodeon	Win, 15th time in a row (20th of all time), 21st nomination	
2023	Jurassic World Camp Cretaceous	Netflix	Second nomination	
2023	Rugrats (2021)	Paramount+	First nomination for revival; ninth nomination overall; first nomination since 2003	
2023	The Loud House	Nickelodeon	Seventh nomination	The Really Loud House was nominated for Favorite Kids TV Show
2023	The Smurfs	Nickelodeon	Second nomination	
2023	Teen Titans Go!	Cartoon Network	Ninth nomination	
2024	SpongeBob SquarePants	Nickelodeon	Win, 16th time in a row (21st of all time), 22nd nomination	SpongeBob and Patrick hosted the year's ceremony
2024	Big City Greens	Disney Channel	First nomination	
2024	Monster High	Nickelodeon	First nomination	
2024	The Loud House	Nickelodeon	Eighth nomination	The Really Loud House was nominated for Favorite Kids TV Show
2024	The Simpsons	Fox	Eighteenth nomination	
2024	Teen Titans Go!	Cartoon Network	Tenth nomination	
2025	SpongeBob SquarePants	Nickelodeon	Win, 17th time in a row (22nd of all time), 23rd nomination	Plankton: The Movie was nominated for Favorite Animated Movie
2025	Dragon Ball Daima	Netflix	First nomination, second anime nomination for Favorite Cartoon	
2025	Monster High	Nickelodeon	Second nomination	
2025	The Loud House	Nickelodeon	Ninth nomination	The Really Loud House was nominated for Favorite Kids TV Show
2025	The Simpsons	Fox	Nineteenth nomination	
2025	Teen Titans Go!	Cartoon Network	Eleventh nomination	
2026	SpongeBob SquarePants	Nickelodeon	Win, 18th time in a row (23rd of all time), 24th nomination	The SpongeBob Movie: Search for SquarePants was nominated for Favorite Animated Movie; Mark Hamill and Tom Kenny were nominated for "Favorite Voice from an Animated Movie"; Mark Hamill was nominated for "Favorite Villain"
2026	The Bad Guys: The Series	Netflix	First nomination	
2026	Big City Greens	Disney Channel	Second nomination	
2026	Phineas and Ferb	Disney Channel	First nomination since 2016; ninth nomination overall	
2026	The Simpsons	Fox	Twentieth nomination	
2026	Teen Titans Go!	Cartoon Network	Twelfth nomination	

== Most Wins ==
=== 23 Wins ===
- SpongeBob SquarePants

=== 6 Wins ===
- Rugrats

=== 1 Win ===
- Doug
- The Simpsons
- Avatar: The Last Airbender

== Number of times each cartoon was nominated ==
=== 24 Times ===
- **SpongeBob SquarePants**

=== 20 Times ===
- **The Simpsons**

=== 12 Times ===
- Teen Titans Go!

=== 9 Times ===
- The Loud House
- Phineas and Ferb

=== 8 Times ===
- **Rugrats** (original series)

=== 7 Times ===
- The Fairly OddParents

=== 6 Times ===
- Alvinnn!!! and the Chipmunks

=== 5 Times ===
- Teenage Mutant Ninja Turtles (Overall franchise)

=== 3 Times ===
- Animaniacs
- Hey Arnold!
- The Amazing World of Gumball

=== 2 Times ===
- CatDog
- **Doug**
- Ed, Edd n Eddy
- The Adventures of Jimmy Neutron, Boy Genius
- The Penguins of Madagascar
- Scooby-Doo! Mystery Incorporated
- Adventure Time
- The Boss Baby: Back in Business
- Jurassic World Camp Cretaceous
- The Smurfs
- Monster High
- Big City Greens

=== 1 Time ===
- Aladdin
- Ace Ventura: Pet Detective
- King of the Hill
- Men in Black: The Series
- Pokémon
- The Powerpuff Girls
- Scooby-Doo
- Kim Possible
- The Proud Family
- **Avatar: The Last Airbender**
- Kung Fu Panda: Legends of Awesomeness
- Tom and Jerry
- Gravity Falls
- Ninjago
- Steven Universe
- Lego Jurassic World: Legend of Isla Nublar
- Looney Tunes Cartoons
- Rugrats (2021)
- Dragon Ball Daima
- The Bad Guys: The Series

Bold: Won at least once before.
