= 2019 Kids' Choice Sports =

- Date: taped July 11, 2019 aired August 10, 2019
- Location: Barker Hangar
- Hosted by: Michael Strahan

Television/radio coverage
- Network: Nickelodeon
- Runtime: 90 minutes
- Produced by: Production company: Done and Dusted Nickelodeon Productions; Executive Producers: Jay Schmalholz Rob Bagshaw Constance Schwartz-Morini Michael Strahan
- Directed by: Hamish Hamilton

The 6th Annual Kids' Choice Sports was taped on July 11, 2019 at the Barker Hangar in Santa Monica, California, and was broadcast on August 10. Hall of Fame Athlete and talk show host Michael Strahan hosted the show for the second time. Strahan previously hosted the inaugural show in 2014. As of 2026, this was the last award show held.

== Sports Council ==
A Kids' Choice Sports Council was formed to "lend their expertise and experience to help inform the awards show, consult on the nominee process and give feedback on categories." Committee members are:

- Baron Davis (former Hornets and two-time NBA All-Star)
- Ken Griffey Jr. (former baseball outfielder and 13-time All-Star)
- Lisa Leslie (former WNBA MVP and four-time Olympic gold medal winner)
- Cal Ripken Jr. (former shortstop and third baseman for the Baltimore Orioles and 19-time All-Star)
- Deion Sanders (NFL Pro Football Hall of Famer)
- Misty May-Treanor (three-time Olympic beach volleyball gold medalist)
- Andy Elkin (Agent, Creative Artists Agency)
- Tracy Perlman (VP Entertainment Marketing and Promotions, NFL)
- Jeff Schwartz (President and Founder, Excel Sports Management)
- Jill Smoller (SVP, William Morris Endeavor)
- Leah Wilcox (VP, Talent Relations, NBA)
- Alan Zucker (SVP, IMG Clients Group)
- Michael Phelps (most decorated Olympian of all time)
- Tony Hawk (professional skateboarder)
- Zane Stoddard (VP, Entertainment Marketing and Content Development, NASCAR)
- Condoleezza Rice former College Football Playoff committee member
- Harper Lee Author of To kill a mockingbird and Alabama Crimson Tide football superfan.

== Host ==
- Michael Strahan

== Musical performer ==
- Ciara

== Nominees and winners ==
Winners are highlighted in bold. Nominations were announced on June 6, 2019, and winners were announced on July 12, 2019.

=== Best Male Athlete ===
- **Stephen Curry (NBA, Golden State Warriors)**
  - Bryce Harper (MLB, Philadelphia Phillies)
  - LeBron James (NBA, Los Angeles Lakers)
  - Lionel Messi (La Liga, FC Barcelona)
  - Tiger Woods (Golf)
  - Tom Brady (NFL, New England Patriots)

=== Best Female Athlete ===
- **Alex Morgan (NWSL, Orlando Pride)**
  - Chloe Kim (Snowboarder)
  - Lindsey Vonn (Alpine Ski Racer)
  - Naomi Osaka (WTA)
  - Serena Williams (WTA)
  - Simone Biles (Gymnast)

=== Favorite Breakout Player ===
- **Saquon Barkley (NFL, New York Giants)**
  - A'ja Wilson (WNBA, Las Vegas Aces)
  - Baker Mayfield (NFL, Cleveland Browns)
  - Luka Dončić (NBA, Dallas Mavericks)
  - Naomi Osaka (WTA)
  - Patrick Mahomes (NFL, Kansas City Chiefs)

=== Hands of Gold ===
- **Antonio Brown (NFL, Oakland Raiders)**
  - Braden Holtby (NHL, Washington Capitals)
  - JuJu Smith-Schuster (NFL, Pittsburgh Steelers)
  - Julian Edelman (NFL, New England Patriots)
  - Julio Jones (NFL, Atlanta Falcons)
  - Mookie Betts (MLB, Boston Red Sox)

=== Clutch Player of the Year ===
- **Stephen Curry (NBA, Golden State Warriors)**
  - Carli Lloyd (NWSL, Sky Blue FC)
  - Elena Delle Donne (WNBA, Washington Mystics)
  - James Harden (NBA, Houston Rockets)
  - Julian Edelman (NFL, New England Patriots)
  - Kevin Durant (NBA, Brooklyn Nets)

=== Sickest Moves ===
- **Alex Morgan (NWSL, Orlando Pride)**
  - Carli Lloyd (NWSL, Sky Blue FC)
  - Russell Westbrook, (NBA, Oklahoma City Thunder)
  - Saquon Barkley (NFL, New York Giants)
  - Trae Young (NBA, Atlanta Hawks)
  - Zlatan Ibrahimović (MLS, LA Galaxy)

=== Favorite Soccer Star ===
- **Alex Morgan (NWSL, Orlando Pride)**
  - Carli Lloyd (NWSL, Sky Blue FC)
  - Carlos Vela (MLS, Los Angeles FC)
  - Lionel Messi (La Liga, FC Barcelona)
  - Zlatan Ibrahimović (MLS, LA Galaxy)

=== Favorite Tennis Player ===
- **Serena Williams**
  - Naomi Osaka
  - Novak Djokovic
  - Rafael Nadal
  - Roger Federer
  - Sloane Stephens

=== Favorite Basketball Player ===
- **Stephen Curry (PG, Golden State Warriors)**
  - Breanna Stewart (PF, Seattle Storm)
  - Giannis Antetokounmpo (PF, Milwaukee Bucks)
  - James Harden (SG, Houston Rockets)
  - Joel Embiid (C, Philadelphia 76ers)
  - Kevin Durant (SF, Brooklyn Nets)
  - LeBron James (SF, Los Angeles Lakers)

=== Favorite Football Player ===
- **Tom Brady (QB, New England Patriots)**
  - Baker Mayfield (QB, Cleveland Browns)
  - Khalil Mack (LB, Chicago Bears)
  - Patrick Mahomes (QB, Kansas City Chiefs)
  - Rob Gronkowski (TE, New England Patriots)
  - Russell Wilson (QB, Seattle Seahawks)
  - Saquon Barkley (RB, New York Giants)

=== Favorite Esports Star ===
- **SSSniperWolf**
  - DanTDM
  - Jacksepticeye
  - SonicFox
  - TimTheTatman
  - TSM Myth

=== Most Valuable Most Valuable Player ===
- **Giannis Antetokounmpo (2019 NBA MVP)**
  - Breanna Stewart (2018 WNBA MVP)
  - Nikita Kucherov (2019 NHL MVP)
  - Christian Yelich (2018 NL MVP)
  - Mookie Betts (2018 AL MVP)
  - Patrick Mahomes (2018 NFL MVP)

=== Favorite Action Sports Star ===
- **Chloe Kim (Snowboarder)**
  - Alex Honnold (Rock Climber)
  - Brighton Zeuner (Skateboarder)
  - Jamie Anderson (Snowboarder)
  - John John Florence (Surfer)
  - Nyjah Huston (Skateboarder)

=== King of Swag ===
- **Odell Beckham Jr. (NFL, Cleveland Browns)**
  - James Harden (NBA, Houston Rockets)
  - Jimmy Butler (NBA, Philadelphia 76ers)
  - Lewis Hamilton (Formula 1 Racing)
  - Russell Westbrook (NBA, Oklahoma City Thunder)
  - Travis Kelce (NFL, Kansas City Chiefs)

=== Queen of Swag ===
- **Nikki Bella (WWE)**
  - Ibtihaj Muhammad (Fencing)
  - Serena Williams (WTA)
  - Sloane Stephens (WTA)
  - Stephanie Gilmore (Surfing)
  - Tori Bowie (Track & Field)

=== Best Cannon ===
- **Tom Brady (NFL, New England Patriots)**
  - Baker Mayfield (NFL, Cleveland Browns)
  - Blake Snell (MLB, Tampa Bay Rays)
  - Chris Sale (MLB, Boston Red Sox)
  - Drew Brees (NFL, New Orleans Saints)
  - Patrick Mahomes (NFL, Kansas City Chiefs)

=== Biggest Powerhouse ===
- **LeBron James (NBA, Los Angeles Lakers)**
  - Aaron Donald (NFL, Los Angeles Rams)
  - Giannis Antetokounmpo (NBA, Milwaukee Bucks)
  - Khalil Mack (NFL, Chicago Bears)
  - Rob Gronkowski (NFL, New England Patriots)
  - Serena Williams (WTA)

=== Need for Speed ===
- **Lindsey Vonn (Alpine Ski Racer)**
  - Joey Logano (NASCAR)
  - Katie Ledecky (Swimmer)
  - Kyle Busch (NASCAR)
  - Lewis Hamilton (Formula 1 Racing)
  - Mikaela Shiffrin (Alpine Ski Racer)

=== Nothing But Net ===
- **Stephen Curry (NBA, Golden State Warriors)**
  - James Harden (NBA, Houston Rockets)
  - John Tavares (NHL, Toronto Maple Leafs)
  - Kawhi Leonard (NBA, Los Angeles Clippers)
  - Klay Thompson (NBA, Golden State Warriors)
  - Lionel Messi (La Liga, FC Barcelona)

=== A Golfer ===
- **Tiger Woods**
  - Brooks Koepka
  - Dustin Johnson
  - Lexi Thompson
  - Rickie Fowler
  - Rory McIlroy

=== Favorite Baseball Player ===
- **Aaron Judge (OF, New York Yankees)**
  - Bryce Harper (OF, Philadelphia Phillies)
  - Christian Yelich (OF, Milwaukee Brewers)
  - Clayton Kershaw (P, Los Angeles Dodgers)
  - Mike Trout (OF, Los Angeles Angels)
  - Mookie Betts (OF, Boston Red Sox)

=== Favorite Hockey Player ===
- **Sidney Crosby (Pittsburgh Penguins)**
  - Alexander Ovechkin (Washington Capitals)
  - Braden Holtby (Washington Capitals)
  - Jonathan Toews (Chicago Blackhawks)
  - Marc-André Fleury (Vegas Golden Knights)
  - P. K. Subban (New Jersey Devils)
  - Patrick Kane (Chicago Blackhawks)

=== Favorite Gymnast ===
- **Simone Biles**
  - Aly Raisman
  - Laurie Hernandez
  - Ragan Smith
  - Sam Mikulak
  - Yul Moldauer

=== Legend Award ===
- **Dwyane Wade**

=== Generation Change Award ===
- **Megan Rapinoe**
