= Kids' Choice Award for Favorite Reality Show =

Nickelodeon award

The Nickelodeon Kids' Choice Award for Favorite Reality Show is an award given at the Nickelodeon Kids' Choice Awards. It was first awarded in 2008. In 2015, it was divided with Favorite Reality Show and Favorite Talent Competition Show. In 2016, it was divided again with Favorite Talent Competition and Favorite Cooking Show. The category was absent in 2018. In 2025, it was titled Favorite Reality TV Show. In 2026, it was titled Favorite TV Show Reality Competition.

== Winners and nominees ==
Year	Reality Show	Network
2008	American Idol	Fox
2008	America's Next Top Model	The CW
2008	Are You Smarter than a 5th Grader?	Fox
2008	Deal or No Deal	NBC
2009	American Idol	Fox
2009	America's Next Top Model	The CW
2009	Are You Smarter than a 5th Grader?	Fox
2009	Deal or No Deal	NBC
2010	American Idol	Fox
2010	Are You Smarter than a 5th Grader?	Syndication
2010	So You Think You Can Dance	Fox
2010	Wipeout	ABC
2011	American Idol	Fox
2011	America's Funniest Home Videos	ABC
2011	America's Got Talent	NBC
2011	Wipeout	ABC
2012	Wipeout	ABC
2012	America's Funniest Home Videos	ABC
2012	America's Got Talent	NBC
2012	American Idol	Fox
2013	Wipeout	ABC
2013	America's Got Talent	NBC
2013	American Idol	Fox
2013	The Voice	NBC
2014	Wipeout	ABC
2014	America's Got Talent	NBC
2014	American Idol	Fox
2014	The Voice	NBC
2015
2015	Reality	
2015	Dance Moms	Lifetime
2015	American Ninja Warrior	NBC
2015	Cupcake Wars	Food Network
2015	MasterChef Junior	Fox
2015	Shark Tank	ABC
2015	Wipeout	ABC
2015	Talent Competition	
2015	The Voice	NBC
2015	America's Got Talent	NBC
2015	America's Next Top Model	The CW
2015	American Idol	Fox
2015	Dancing with the Stars	ABC
2015	So You Think You Can Dance	Fox
2016
2016	Talent Competition	
2016	The Voice	NBC
2016	America's Got Talent	NBC
2016	American Idol	Fox
2016	Dance Moms	Lifetime
2016	Dancing with the Stars	ABC
2016	Cooking	
2016	Cake Boss	TLC
2016	Cake Wars	Food Network
2016	Chopped Junior	Food Network
2016	Diners, Drive-Ins and Dives	Food Network
2016	Hell's Kitchen	Fox
2016	MasterChef Junior	Fox
2017	America's Got Talent	NBC
2017	America's Funniest Home Videos	ABC
2017	American Ninja Warrior	NBC
2017	Paradise Run	Nickelodeon
2017	Shark Tank	ABC
2017	The Voice	NBC
2018	(Category was absent)	
2019	America's Got Talent	NBC
2019	American Idol	ABC
2019	American Ninja Warrior	NBC
2019	Dancing with the Stars: Juniors	ABC
2019	Double Dare	Nickelodeon
2019	The Voice	NBC
2020	America's Got Talent	NBC
2020	America's Funniest Home Videos	ABC
2020	American Ninja Warrior	NBC
2020	The Masked Singer	Fox
2020	MasterChef Junior	Fox
2020	The Voice	NBC
2021	America's Got Talent	NBC
2021	American Idol	ABC
2021	American Ninja Warrior Junior	Universal Kids
2021	Lego Masters	Fox
2021	The Masked Singer	Fox
2021	The Voice	NBC
2022	America's Got Talent	NBC
2022	American Idol	ABC
2022	Kids Baking Championship	Food Network
2022	Lego Masters	Fox
2022	The Masked Singer	Fox
2022	Wipeout (2021)	TBS
2023	MasterChef Junior	Fox
2023	America's Funniest Home Videos	ABC
2023	America's Got Talent	NBC
2023	American Ninja Warrior	NBC
2023	Floor Is Lava	Netflix
2023	The Masked Singer	Fox
2024	America's Got Talent	NBC
2024	America's Funniest Home Videos	ABC
2024	American Ninja Warrior	NBC
2024	Is It Cake?	Netflix
2024	Kids Baking Championship	Food Network
2024	Lego Masters	Fox
2025	America's Got Talent	NBC
2025	America's Funniest Home Videos	ABC
2025	American Idol	ABC
2025	American Ninja Warrior	NBC
2025	The Masked Singer	Fox
2025	MasterChef Junior	Fox
2026	America's Got Talent	NBC
2026	American Idol	ABC
2026	American Ninja Warrior	NBC
2026	Lego Masters	Fox
2026	Survivor	CBS
2026	The Voice	NBC

== Programs with multiple awards ==
8 awards

- America's Got Talent (2 consecutive)

4 awards

- American Idol (consecutive)

3 awards

- Wipeout (consecutive)

2 awards

- The Voice (consecutive)

== Programs with multiple nominations ==
15 nominations

- America's Got Talent
- American Idol

9 nominations

- The Voice

8 nominations

- American Ninja Warrior

6 nominations

- America's Funniest Home Videos
- Wipeout

5 nominations

- The Masked Singer
- MasterChef Junior

4 nominations

- Lego Masters

3 nominations

- America's Next Top Model
- Are You Smarter than a 5th Grader?

2 nominations

- Dance Moms
- Dancing with the Stars
- Deal or No Deal
- Shark Tank
- So You Think You Can Dance
