= 2014 Kids' Choice Sports =

- Date: July 17, 2014
- Location: UCLA Pauley Pavilion, Westwood, Los Angeles
- Hosted by: Michael Strahan
- Preshow hosts: Carlos PenaVega; Kira Kosarin

Television/radio coverage
- Network: Nickelodeon
- Runtime: 90 minutes
- Produced by: Production company: Done and Dusted Nickelodeon Productions; Executive Producers: Jay Schmalholz Shelly Sumpter Gillyard Constance Schwartz Michael Strahan
- Directed by: Hamish Hamilton

The 1st Annual Kids' Choice Sports was held on July 17, 2014, at the Pauley Pavilion in Los Angeles, California. Hall of Fame Athlete/Talk Show host Michael Strahan hosted the ceremony to celebrate kids’ favorites in the sports world. When this award show aired, Nickelodeon took their other channels off the air with a message telling people to go watch the awards show on the main channel. The ceremony was preceded by the series finale of Sam & Cat.

== Sports Council ==
A Kids' Choice Sports Council was formed to "lend their expertise and experience to help inform the awards show, consult on the nominee process and give feedback on categories." Committee members are:

- Baron Davis (former New York Knicks and two-time NBA All-Star)
- Ken Griffey Jr. (former baseball outfielder and 13-time All-Star)
- Lisa Leslie (former WNBA MVP and four-time Olympic gold medal winner)
- Cal Ripken Jr. (former shortstop and third baseman for the Baltimore Orioles and 19-time All-Star)
- Deion Sanders (NFL Pro Football Hall of Famer)
- Misty May-Treanor (three-time Olympic beach volleyball gold medalist)
- Andy Elkin (Agent, Creative Artists Agency)
- Tracy Perlman (VP Entertainment Marketing and Promotions, NFL)
- Jeff Schwartz (President and Founder, Excel Sports Management)
- Jill Smoller (SVP, William Morris Endeavor)
- Leah Wilcox (VP, Talent Relations, NBA)
- Alan Zucker (SVP, IMG Clients Group)
- Michael Phelps (most decorated Olympian of all time)
- Tony Hawk (professional skateboarder)
- Zane Stoddard (VP, Entertainment Marketing and Content Development, NASCAR)

== Presenters, performers, and stunts ==
=== Host ===
- Michael Strahan
- Carlos PenaVega and Kira Kosarin (Orange Carpet)

=== Musical performers ===
- Florida Georgia Line - "Cruise" and "This Is How We Roll"
- Pharrell Williams - "Happy"

=== Presenters ===
- Will Arnett
- Russell Westbrook
- Nick Cannon
- Victor Cruz
- Stephen Curry
- Carlos PenaVega
- Larry Fitzgerald
- Megan Fox
- Tia Mowry
- Dwayne "The Rock" Johnson
- Bethany Hamilton
- Tony Hawk
- George Lopez
- Henrik Lundqvist
- Marshawn Lynch
- McKayla Maroney
- Floyd Mayweather Jr.
- Dominic Monaghan
- Rico Rodriguez
- Metta World Peace

=== Slime stunt ===
- Power Dunk Challenge – Larry Fitzgerald (winner) dunked Earl Thomas III into a giant tank of slime, then got dropped himself into a vat.

=== Gold Slime ===
- After David Beckham accepted the Legend Award, he and his two sons got slimed. The slime was a metallic gold color for the first time.

== Legend Award ==
- David Beckham (winner)

== Winners and nominees ==
=== Best Male Athlete ===
- Kevin Durant (Oklahoma City Thunder) (winner)
- Tom Brady (New England Patriots)
- Dale Earnhardt Jr. (NASCAR)
- LeBron James (Miami Heat)
- Derek Jeter (New York Yankees)
- Peyton Manning (Denver Broncos)
- Dwyane Wade (Miami Heat)
- Tiger Woods (Golf)

=== Best Female Athlete ===
- Gabby Douglas (US Gymnastics) (winner)
- Gracie Gold (US Figure Skater)
- Candace Parker (Los Angeles Sparks)
- Danica Patrick (NASCAR)
- Hope Solo (Women's Soccer)
- Lindsey Vonn (US Skiing)
- Serena Williams (Women's Tennis)

=== Favorite Newcomer ===
- Russell Wilson (Seattle Seahawks) (winner)
- Skylar Diggins (Tulsa Shock)
- Bryce Harper (Washington Nationals)
- Yasiel Puig (Los Angeles Dodgers)
- Sloane Stephens (Women's Tennis)
- Mike Trout (Los Angeles Angels)

=== Favorite Catch ===
- Dez Bryant (Dallas Cowboys) (winner)
- Calvin Johnson (Detroit Lions)
- Yasiel Puig (Los Angeles Dodgers)
- Mike Trout (Los Angeles Angels)

=== Best Save ===
- Tim Howard (Everton Football Club and the US Men's Soccer Team) (winner)
- Henrik Lundqvist (New York Rangers)
- Ryan Miller (St. Louis Blues)
- Jonathan Quick (Los Angeles Kings)
- Hope Solo (Women's Soccer)

=== Clutch Player of the Year ===
- Carmelo Anthony (New York Knicks) (winner)
- Skylar Diggins (Tulsa Shock)
- Kevin Durant (Oklahoma City Thunder)
- LeBron James (Cleveland Cavaliers)
- Marshawn Lynch (Seattle Seahawks)
- David Ortiz (Boston Red Sox)
- Abby Wambach (US Women's Soccer Team)

=== Sickest Moves ===
- Alex Morgan (US Women's Soccer Team) (winner)
- Sidney Crosby (Pittsburgh Penguins)
- Landon Donovan (Los Angeles Galaxy and the US Men's Soccer Team)
- Blake Griffin (Los Angeles Clippers)
- Lionel Messi (FC Barcelona and the Argentina National Team)
- Alexander Ovechkin (Washington Capitals) (winner)
- Chris Paul (Los Angeles Clippers)
- Adrian Peterson (Minnesota Vikings)

=== Don't Try This At Home Award ===
- Shaun White (Snowboarder and Skateboarder) (winner)
- Nyjah Huston (Street Skateboarder)
- Travis Pastrana (Motorsports Competitor)
- Kelly Slater (Surfer)
- Lindsey Vonn (US Skiing)

=== Smells Like Team Spirit ===
- Seattle Seahawks Fans (12th Man) (winner)
- Detroit Red Wings Fans (Hockeytown)
- Green Bay Fans (Cheeseheads)
- Oakland Raiders Fans (Black Hole)
- Oklahoma City Thunder Fans (Thunder)
- Pittsburgh Steelers Fans (Terrible Towels)

=== Party Like a Sports Star ===
- Victor Cruz (New York Giants) (winner)
- Knowshon Moreno (Miami Dolphins)
- Rafael Nadal (Tennis)
- Cam Newton (Carolina Panthers)
- Cristiano Ronaldo (Real Madrid and Portugal National Team)
- Abby Wambach (US Women's Soccer)

=== King of Swag ===
- Dwyane Wade (Miami Heat) (winner)
- Eric Decker (Denver Broncos)
- Henrik Lundqvist (New York Rangers)
- Cristiano Ronaldo (Real Madrid and Portugal National Team)
- Amar'e Stoudemire (New York Knicks)
- Russell Westbrook (Oklahoma City Thunder)

=== Queen of Swag ===
- Gabby Douglas (US Gymnast) (winner)
- Skylar Diggins (Tulsa Shock)
- Lolo Jones (US Track and Field and Bobsled)
- Maria Sharapova (Women's Tennis)
- Lindsey Vonn (US Skiing)
- Serena Williams (Women's Tennis)

=== Biggest Cannon ===
- Novak Djokovic (Tennis) (winner)
- Serena Williams (Women`s Tennis)
- Clayton Kershaw (Los Angeles Dodgers)
- Cam Newton (Carolina Panthers)
- Aaron Rodgers (Green Bay Packers)
- Ben Roethlisberger (Pittsburgh Steelers)
- Justin Verlander (Detroit Tigers)

=== Favorite Comeback Athlete ===
- Bethany Hamilton (Surfer) (winner)
- Peyton Manning (Denver Broncos)
- Adrian Peterson (Minnesota Vikings)
- Albert Pujols (Los Angeles Angels)
- Rajon Rondo (Boston Celtics)
- Russell Westbrook (Oklahoma City Thunder)
