= Kids' Choice Award for Favorite Animated Movie =

Annual movie award

This is a list of the winners of, and nominees for, the Kids' Choice Award for Favorite Animated Movie, given at the Nickelodeon Kids' Choice Awards. It was first awarded in 2006.

== Winners and nominees ==
The winners are listed in bold.

Year	Winner	Nominees
2006	**Madagascar**	Chicken Little; Robots; Wallace & Gromit: The Curse of the Were-Rabbit≈
2007	**Happy Feet**≈	Cars≠; Ice Age: The Meltdown; Over the Hedge
2008	**Ratatouille**≈	Bee Movie; Shrek the Third; The Simpsons Movie
2009	**Madagascar: Escape 2 Africa**	Bolt≠; Kung Fu Panda≠; WALL-E≈
2010	**Up**≈	A Christmas Carol; Ice Age: Dawn of the Dinosaurs; Monsters vs. Aliens
2011	**Despicable Me**	How to Train Your Dragon≠; Shrek Forever After; Toy Story 3≈
2012	**Puss in Boots**≠	Cars 2; Kung Fu Panda 2≠; Rio
2013	**Wreck-It Ralph**≠	Brave≈; Ice Age: Continental Drift; Madagascar 3: Europe's Most Wanted
2014	**Frozen**≈	Cloudy with a Chance of Meatballs 2; Despicable Me 2≠; Monsters University
2015	**Big Hero 6**≈	How to Train Your Dragon 2≠; The Lego Movie; Penguins of Madagascar; Rio 2; The SpongeBob Movie: Sponge Out of Water
2016	**Hotel Transylvania 2**	Alvin and the Chipmunks: The Road Chip; Home; Inside Out≈; Minions; The Peanuts Movie
2017	**Finding Dory**	Moana≠; The Secret Life of Pets; Sing; Trolls; Zootopia≈
2018	**Coco**≈	Captain Underpants: The First Epic Movie; Cars 3; Despicable Me 3; The Emoji Movie; Ferdinand≠; The Lego Batman Movie; Smurfs: The Lost Village
2019	**Incredibles 2**≠	The Grinch; Hotel Transylvania 3: Summer Vacation; Peter Rabbit; Ralph Breaks the Internet≠; Spider-Man: Into the Spider-Verse≈
2020	**Frozen 2**	The Angry Birds Movie 2; The Lego Movie 2: The Second Part; The Lion King; The Secret Life of Pets 2; Toy Story 4≈
2021	**Soul**≈	Onward≠; Phineas and Ferb the Movie: Candace Against the Universe; The Croods: A New Age; Trolls World Tour; Scoob!
2022	**Encanto**≈	Luca≠; Paw Patrol: The Movie; Sing 2; The Boss Baby: Family Business; The SpongeBob Movie: Sponge on the Run
2023	**Minions: The Rise of Gru**	DC League of Super-Pets; Hotel Transylvania: Transformania; Lightyear; The Bad Guys; Turning Red≠
2024	**Spider-Man: Across the Spider-Verse**≠	Elemental≠; Kung Fu Panda 4; Paw Patrol: The Mighty Movie; Teenage Mutant Ninja Turtles: Mutant Mayhem; The Garfield Movie; The Super Mario Bros. Movie; Trolls Band Together
2025	**Inside Out 2**≠	Despicable Me 4; Dog Man; Moana 2; Mufasa: The Lion King; Plankton: The Movie; The Wild Robot≠; Transformers One
2026	**Zootopia 2**≠	Avatar Aang: The Last Airbender; KPop Demon Hunters≈; Minions & Monsters; Paw Patrol: The Dino Movie; The SpongeBob Movie: Search for SquarePants; The Super Mario Galaxy Movie; Toy Story 5

== Franchises with multiple wins and nominees ==
- Despicable Me - 7 (2 wins)
- Madagascar - 4 (2 wins)
- Hotel Transylvania - 3 (1 win)
- Shrek - 3 (1 win)
- Frozen - 2 (2 wins)
- Inside Out - 2 (1 win)
- Spider Verse - 2 (1 win)
- Wreck-It-Ralph - 2 (1 win)
- Zootopia - 2 (1 win)
- Cars - 3 (no win)
- Ice Age - 3 (no win)
- Kung Fu Panda - 3 (no win)
- The Lego Movie - 3 (no win)
- SpongeBob SquarePants - 4 (no win)
- Toy Story - 4 (no win)
- Trolls - 3 (no win)
- Captain Underpants - 2 (no win)
- How to Train Your Dragon - 2 (no win)
- The Lion King - 2 (no win)
- Moana - 2 (no win)
- Paw Patrol - 3 (no win)
- Rio - 2 (no win)
- The Secret Life of Pets - 2 (no win)
- Sing - 2 (no win)
- Super Mario - 2 (no win)

== See also ==
- Golden Globe Award for Best Animated Feature Film

== Notes ==
- ≈ indicates an Academy Award for Best Animated Feature winner
- ≠ indicates an Academy Award for Best Animated Feature nominee
