= 2009 Kids' Choice Awards =

Children's television awards show program broadcast in 2009

- Date: March 28, 2009
- Location: Pauley Pavilion
- Hosted by: Dwayne Johnson
- Preshow hosts: Lily Collins; Jeff Sutphen (as Pick Boy); Lil' JJ

Highlights
- Most awards: High School Musical 3: Senior Year (2)
- Most nominations: The Suite Life of Zack & Cody (3); Miley Cyrus (3)

Television/radio coverage
- Network: Nickelodeon
- Runtime: 125+ minutes
- Viewership: 7.68 million
- Produced by: Paul Flattery
- Directed by: Beth McCarthy-Miller

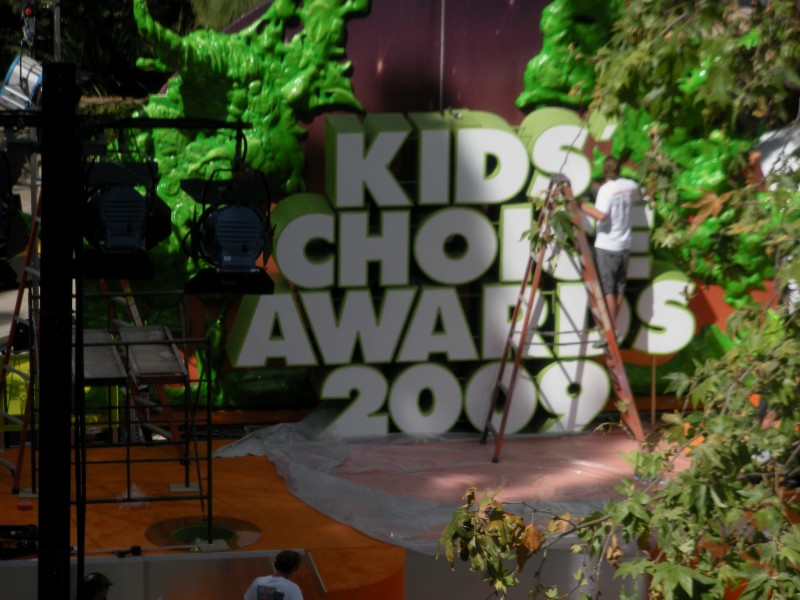
Finishing up with the "Orange Carpet" for the Kids' Choice Awards at Pauley Pavilion, UCLA campus

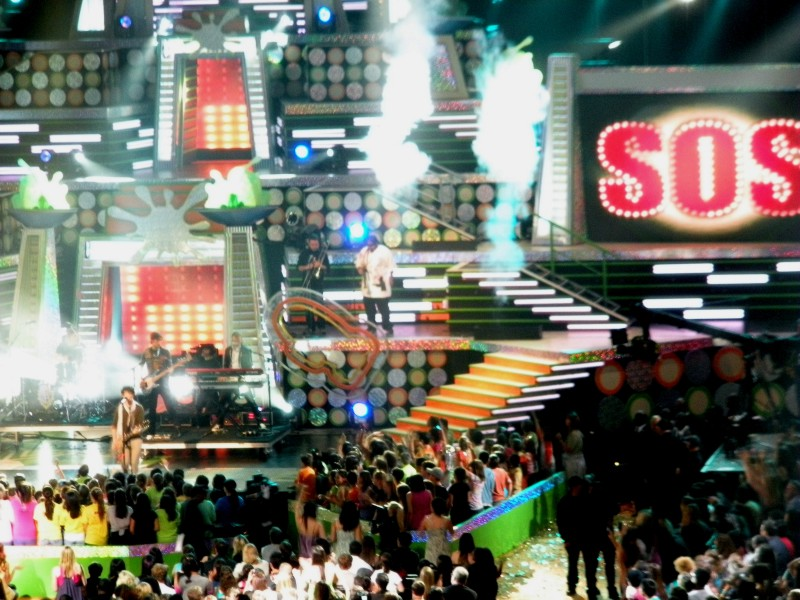
Jonas Brothers performing at the Kids' Choice Awards 2009

The 22nd Annual Nickelodeon Kids' Choice Awards was held on March 28, 2009, on the Nell and John Wooden Court of Pauley Pavilion, with Dwayne Johnson as host. Voting commenced on March 2, 2009. Performers and presenters for the event were announced on its official website. The show marks the last time that the Nickelodeon Orange Blimp was used on the Kids' Choice Awards logo, as Nickelodeon rebranded its logo six months after the ceremony, until the 2013 show.

According to Nickelodeon, the show was broadcast in more than "228 million households across Nickelodeon's 50 channels in Europe, Russia, the Middle East, Asia, Australia and Latin America." It was watched by 7.7 million viewers in the United States. More votes than ever were cast for this year's KCAs. A record 91.1 million votes were cast on Nickelodeon websites.

Prior to the live telecast, Lily Collins, Pick Boy (played by Jeff Sutphen) and Lil' JJ hosted the "orange carpet", featuring celebrity interviews and a live performance by Miranda Cosgrove outside Pauley Pavilion.

== Presenters and performers, and stunts for KCA 2009 ==
=== Host ===
- Dwayne Johnson

Presenters

- Sandra Bullock
- John Cena
- Lily Collins
- Miranda Cosgrove
- Chace Crawford
- Cameron Diaz
- Zac Efron
- America Ferrera
- Megan Fox
- Hugh Jackman
- Shia LaBeouf
- Queen Latifah
- George Lopez
- Keke Palmer
- Josh Peck
- Chris Pine
- Amy Poehler
- Emma Roberts
- Chris Rock
- Fred Roggin
- Ben Stiller
- Marlon Wayans
- Owen Wilson
- Alex Wolff
- Nat Wolff

Performers

- Jonas Brothers – Main program "SOS"/"Burnin' Up"
- The Pussycat Dolls – Main program "Jai Ho! (You Are My Destiny)"/"When I Grow Up"

Slime Stunts

- Sandra Bullock
- Will Ferrell
- Hugh Jackman
- Dwayne Johnson
- Jonas Brothers
- Jesse McCartney

Announcer

- Tom Kenny

Burp Zone

- Jerry Trainor
- Matt Shively
- Ashley Argota
- Victoria Justice
- Nathan Kress
- Jennette McCurdy

Special Appearance

- Justin Timberlake – Taught Dwayne Johnson how to dance (in a commercial).
- Jesse McCartney – Opened the doors for Dwayne Johnson.
- Miranda Cosgrove – Helped Dwayne Johnson get the codes and helped him get the blimps (in a commercial).
- Tom Kenny – Told Dwayne Johnson he had to find a key to unlock the slime.
- Jonas Brothers – Revealed as the "Slime gods" who cause them to become slimed.

Nicktoon Appearances

- Bessie Higgenbottom (voiced by Amy Poehler) from The Mighty B!
- SpongeBob SquarePants and Patrick Star (archive footage)
- Timmy Turner and Poof from The Fairly OddParents
- Otis (voiced by Chris Hardwick), Pip, and Pig from Back at the Barnyard
- The Penguins of Madagascar

== Winners and nominees ==
Winners are listed first, in bold. Other nominees are in alphabetical order.

=== Movies ===
Favorite Movie	Favorite Movie Actor
**High School Musical 3: Senior Year**; Bedtime Stories; The Dark Knight; Iron Man	**Will Smith** – Hancock as John Hancock; Jim Carrey – Yes Man as Carl Allen; George Lopez – Beverly Hills Chihuahua as Papi; Adam Sandler – Bedtime Stories as Skeeter Bronson
Favorite Movie Actress	Favorite Animated Movie
**Vanessa Hudgens** – High School Musical 3: Senior Year as Gabriella Montez; Jennifer Aniston – Marley & Me as Jennifer "Jenny" Grogan; Anne Hathaway – Get Smart as Agent 99; Reese Witherspoon – Four Christmases as Kate	**Madagascar: Escape 2 Africa**; Bolt; Kung Fu Panda; WALL-E
Favorite Voice From an Animated Movie
**Jack Black** – Kung Fu Panda as Po; Jim Carrey – Horton Hears a Who! as Horton; Miley Cyrus – Bolt as Penny; Ben Stiller – Madagascar: Escape 2 Africa as Alex

=== Television ===
Favorite TV Show	Favorite TV Actor
**iCarly**; Hannah Montana; The Suite Life of Zack & Cody; Zoey 101	**Dylan Sprouse** – The Suite Life of Zack & Cody as Zack Martin; Jason Lee – My Name Is Earl as Earl Hickey; Cole Sprouse – The Suite Life of Zack & Cody as Cody Martin; Nat Wolff – The Naked Brothers Band as Himself
Favorite TV Actress	Favorite Reality Show
**Selena Gomez** – Wizards of Waverly Place as Alex Russo; Miranda Cosgrove – iCarly as Carly Shay; Miley Cyrus – Hannah Montana as Miley Stewart / Hannah Montana; America Ferrera – Ugly Betty as Betty Suarez	**American Idol**; America's Next Top Model; Are You Smarter than a 5th Grader?; Deal or No Deal
Favorite Cartoon
**SpongeBob SquarePants**; The Fairly OddParents; Phineas and Ferb; The Simpsons

=== Music ===
Favorite Music Group	Favorite Male Singer
**Jonas Brothers**; Daughtry; Linkin Park; Pussycat Dolls	**Jesse McCartney**; Chris Brown; Kid Rock; T-Pain
Favorite Female Singer	Favorite Song
**Miley Cyrus**; Beyoncé; Alicia Keys; Rihanna	**"Single Ladies (Put a Ring on It)"** – Beyoncé; "Don't Stop the Music" – Rihanna; "I Kissed a Girl" – Katy Perry; "Kiss Kiss" – Chris Brown feat. T-Pain

=== Sports ===
Favorite Male Athlete	Favorite Female Athlete
**Peyton Manning**; LeBron James; Michael Phelps; Tiger Woods	**Candace Parker**; Danica Patrick; Serena Williams; Venus Williams

=== Miscellaneous ===
Favorite Video Game	Favorite Book
**Guitar Hero World Tour**; Mario Kart Wii; Mario Super Sluggers; Rock Band 2	**Twilight series**; Diary of a Wimpy Kid; Diary of a Wimpy Kid Do-It-Yourself Book; Harry Potter series

== Removal ==
- Chris Brown was nominated for Favorite Song and Male Singer but was removed from the voting, due largely to his altercation with Rihanna in February.
