= 2007 Kids' Choice Awards =

Children's television awards show program broadcast in 2007

- Date: March 31, 2007
- Location: Pauley Pavilion
- Hosted by: Justin Timberlake

Highlights
- Most awards: Beyoncé (2)
- Most nominations: Pirates of the Caribbean: Dead Man's Chest (3)

Television/radio coverage
- Network: Nickelodeon
- Viewership: 6.1 million
- Produced by: Paul Flattery
- Directed by: Bruce Gowers

The 20th Annual Nickelodeon Kids' Choice Awards was held on March 31, 2007, and hosted by Justin Timberlake. The show was held at Pauley Pavilion on the campus of the University of California, Los Angeles. Gwen Stefani (with Akon) and Maroon 5 performed live.

Online voting began on March 5, 2007. A "Name That Nominee" special hosted by Lil' JJ aired on March 11. Another special called "Deep Inside the KCAs" (hosted by Emma Roberts) aired on March 18.

== Musical Guests ==
Countdown to Kids' Choice:

- Drake Bell: "Hollywood Girl"

The Show:

- Maroon 5: "Makes Me Wonder"
- Gwen Stefani featuring Akon: "The Sweet Escape"

== Presenters ==
Favorite Movie Actress:

- Will Ferrell, Jon Heder, Emma Roberts

Favorite Music Group:

- Nat Wolff, Alex Wolff, Hilary Duff

Special Bungee Jumping Slime World Record:

- Ryan Seacrest

Favorite TV Show:

- Ice Cube, Ty Pennington

Favorite Voice From an Animated Movie:

- Jessica Alba, Chris Evans

Maroon 5:

- Chris Brown, Jamie Lynn Spears

Favorite TV Actor:

- Hayden Panettiere, Masi Oka

Wannabe Award:

- Jack Black

Favorite Animated Movie:

- Steve Carell, Tobey Maguire

Favorite Movie Actor:

- Shia LaBeouf, Mandy Moore

Kids' Choice Burp Contest:

- Kenan Thompson

Favorite Male Singer:

- George Lopez, Tyler James Williams, Bindi Irwin

Gwen Stefani feat. Akon:

- Ryan Sheckler, Nelly

Favorite Movie:

- Queen Latifah, Zac Efron

Unpresented Winners:

- Devon Werkheiser, Lil' JJ, Rihanna

Options for Breaking the Slime Barrier:

- Jesse McCartney, Ciara

== Winners and nominees ==
Winners are listed first, in bold. Other nominees are in alphabetical order.

=== Movies ===
Favorite Movie	Favorite Movie Actor
**Pirates of the Caribbean: Dead Man's Chest**; Big Momma's House 2; Click; Night at the Museum	**Adam Sandler** – Click as Michael Newman; Jack Black – Nacho Libre as Nacho; Johnny Depp – Pirates of the Caribbean: Dead Man's Chest as Captain Jack Sparrow; Will Smith – The Pursuit of Happyness as Chris Gardner
Favorite Movie Actress	Favorite Animated Movie
**Dakota Fanning** – Charlotte's Web as Fern Arable; Halle Berry – X-Men: The Last Stand as Ororo Munroe / Storm; Keira Knightley – Pirates of the Caribbean: Dead Man's Chest as Elizabeth Swann; Sarah Jessica Parker – Failure to Launch as Paula	**Happy Feet**; Cars; Ice Age: The Meltdown; Over the Hedge
Favorite Voice From an Animated Movie
**Queen Latifah** – Ice Age: The Meltdown as Ellie; Ashton Kutcher – Open Season as Elliot; Julia Roberts – The Ant Bully as Hova; Bruce Willis – Over the Hedge as RJ

=== Television ===
Favorite TV Show	Favorite TV Actor
**American Idol**; Drake & Josh; Fear Factor; The Suite Life of Zack & Cody	**Drake Bell** – Drake & Josh as Drake Parker; Jason Lee – My Name Is Earl as Earl Hickey; Charlie Sheen – Two and a Half Men as Charlie Harper; Cole Sprouse – The Suite Life of Zack & Cody as Cody Martin
Favorite TV Actress	Favorite Cartoon
**Miley Cyrus** – Hannah Montana as Miley Stewart; Raven-Symoné – That's So Raven as Raven Baxter; Emma Roberts – Unfabulous as Addie Singer; Jamie Lynn Spears – Zoey 101 as Zoey Brooks	**SpongeBob SquarePants**; The Adventures of Jimmy Neutron, Boy Genius; The Fairly OddParents; The Simpsons

=== Music ===
Favorite Male Singer	Favorite Female Singer
**Justin Timberlake**; Chris Brown; Jesse McCartney; Sean Paul	**Beyoncé**; Christina Aguilera; Ciara; Jessica Simpson
Favorite Music Group	Favorite Song
**The Black Eyed Peas**; Fall Out Boy; Nickelback; Red Hot Chili Peppers	**"Irreplaceable"** – Beyoncé; "Bad Day" – Daniel Powter; "Crazy" – Gnarls Barkley; "Hips Don't Lie" – Shakira feat. Wyclef Jean

=== Miscellaneous ===
Favorite Athlete	Favorite Book
**Shaquille O'Neal**; LeBron James; Alex Rodriguez; Tiger Woods	**Harry Potter series**; How to Eat Fried Worms; Island of the Blue Dolphins; A Series of Unfortunate Events
Favorite Video Game
**SpongeBob SquarePants: Creature from the Krusty Krab**; Madden NFL 07; Mario Kart DS; New Super Mario Bros.

=== Wannabe Award ===
- Ben Stiller

== Slimed Celebrities ==
- Justin Timberlake
- Jackie Chan
- Chris Tucker
- Mandy Moore
- Tobey Maguire
- Steve Carell
- Nicole Kidman
- Vince Vaughn
