= 2008 Kids' Choice Awards =

Children's television awards show program broadcast in 2008

- Date: March 29, 2008
- Location: Pauley Pavilion, Los Angeles, California
- Hosted by: Jack Black

Highlights
- Most awards: Drake and Josh (2); Miley Cyrus (2)
- Most nominations: Shrek the Third (4)

Television/radio coverage
- Network: Nickelodeon
- Viewership: 7.45 million
- Produced by: Paul Flattery
- Directed by: Beth McCarthy-Miller

The 21st Annual Nickelodeon Kids' Choice Awards was held on March 29, 2008, at the Pauley Pavilion in Los Angeles, California, and was the first live-action/animated ceremony. The event was hosted by Jack Black. Voting began March 3 on Nick.com and Nicktropolis. A "Bring on the Nominees" special hosted by Lil' JJ also aired. The Naked Brothers Band and Miley Cyrus were the musical performers. A sweepstakes was announced to promote the show. The number of votes cast broke the record previously set in 2007. 86,708,020 kids cast 88,254,272 votes (since kids were allowed to vote multiple times) between March 3–29 in 18 categories, to honor and vote for their favorites. Votes were cast via Nick.com, Nicktropolis, TurboNick, and for the first time via Nick's new mobile website (wap.nick.com). The award show attracted 7.7 million viewers.

The 2008 Kids' Choice Awards is notable for being the only time that SpongeBob SquarePants did not win the Kids' Choice Award for Favorite Cartoon since the show was first nominated in 2003, with Avatar: The Last Airbender winning instead.

== Presenters and Performers, and Stunts for KCA 2008 ==
=== Presenters (in order of appearance) ===
Celebrity (ies)	Presenting
Jack Black	Hosted the Awards
Miranda Cosgrove	Cameo appearances throughout the show
Tom Kenny	Newly titled himself, "The Voice in a Box" (announcer), SpongeBob
Josh Peck; Janet Jackson	Favorite Movie Actress
Emile Hirsch; America Ferrera	Favorite Music Group
Laila Ali	Introduced Akon, Usher and Heidi Klum for the slime stunts
James Marsden; Hayden Panettiere	Favorite Female Singer
Shia LaBeouf; Harrison Ford	Favorite Voice From an Animated Movie
Ryan Sheckler; Abigail Breslin	Introduced The Naked Brothers Band
Pete Wentz; Ashlee Simpson-Wentz	Favorite Reality Show
Jennifer Love Hewitt; Devon Werkheiser	Favorite Male Singer
Ashton Kutcher	Wannabe Award
Howie Mandel	Introduced the YMCA burping contest
Jaden, Willow & Will Smith	Introduced Miley Cyrus
Rihanna; Brendan Fraser	Favorite TV Show
Steve Carell; Amy Poehler	Favorite Movie

=== Performers (in order of appearance) ===
- The Naked Brothers Band performed "I Don't Want to Go to School"
- Miley Cyrus performed "G.N.O (Girl's Night Out)"

=== Slimed Celebrities ===
- Harrison Ford – While presenting Favorite Voice From an Animated Movie with Shia LaBeouf, Ford replaced an orb containing the winner with a blimp, similar to the classic scene in Raiders of the Lost Ark. Also like that scene, a "booby-trap" bucket of slime was dumped onto his head. Ford joked about it and LaBeouf gave him his trademark fedora.
- Brendan Fraser – While presenting Favorite TV Show with Rihanna, who was carrying an umbrella, Fraser asked why she had one. The singer slyly replied that "this is for you", and a stream of slime rose from the podium and hit Fraser's forehead.
- Orlando Bloom – Bloom was the mystery celebrity at the end of the show who got slimed with 27 gallons of the green goo alongside Jack Black.
- Jack Black – The host was slimed at the end of the show with the 27 gallons of slime collected from the slime stunts with Orlando Bloom.

=== Slime Stunts (in order of appearance) ===
- 1/3 – Akon performed the Slime-o-Lition Derby driving the Jack Black Bobblehead.
- 2/3 – Usher performed using a high pressure slime cannon shooter blasting the costume sumo wrestler five feet. (Note: The level was tilted so the sumo wrestler can go to 5 ft.)
- 3/3 – Heidi Klum performed the human dartboard using a butt spike belt.

=== Nicktoon appearance ===
- Otis and Pip form Back at the Barnyard.

== Winners and nominees ==
Winners are listed first, in bold. Other nominees are in alphabetical order.

=== Movies ===
Favorite Movie	Favorite Movie Actor
**Alvin and the Chipmunks**; Are We Done Yet?; Pirates of the Caribbean: At World's End; Transformers	**Johnny Depp** – Pirates of the Caribbean: At World's End as Captain Jack Sparrow; Ice Cube – Are We Done Yet? as Nicholas "Nick" Persons; Dwayne "The Rock" Johnson – The Game Plan as Joseph "Joe" Kingman; Eddie Murphy – Norbit as Norbit Albert Rice, Rasputia Latimore and Mr. Hangten Wong
Favorite Movie Actress	Favorite Animated Movie
**Jessica Alba** – Fantastic Four: Rise of the Silver Surfer as Sue Storm / Invisible Woman; Drew Barrymore – Music and Lyrics as Sophie Fisher; Kirsten Dunst – Spider-Man 3 as Mary Jane "M.J." Watson; Keira Knightley – Pirates of the Caribbean: At World's End as Elizabeth Swann	**Ratatouille**; Bee Movie; Shrek the Third; The Simpsons Movie
Favorite Voice From an Animated Movie
**Eddie Murphy** – Shrek the Third as Donkey; Cameron Diaz – Shrek the Third as Princess Fiona; Mike Myers – Shrek the Third as Shrek; Jerry Seinfeld – Bee Movie as Barry B. Benson

=== Television ===
Favorite TV Show	Favorite TV Actor
**Drake & Josh**; Hannah Montana; iCarly; The Suite Life of Zack & Cody	**Drake Bell** – Drake & Josh as Drake Parker; Josh Peck – Drake & Josh as Josh Nichols; Cole Sprouse – The Suite Life of Zack & Cody as Cody Martin; Dylan Sprouse – The Suite Life of Zack & Cody as Zack Martin
Favorite TV Actress	Favorite Reality Show
**Miley Cyrus** – Hannah Montana as Miley Stewart; Raven-Symoné – That's So Raven as Raven Baxter; Emma Roberts – Unfabulous as Addie Singer; Jamie Lynn Spears – Zoey 101 as Zoey Brooks	**American Idol**; America's Next Top Model; Are You Smarter than a 5th Grader?; Deal or No Deal
Favorite Cartoon
**Avatar: The Last Airbender**; Ed, Edd n Eddy; The Simpsons; SpongeBob SquarePants

=== Music ===
Favorite Music Group	Favorite Male Singer
**Jonas Brothers**; Boys Like Girls; Fall Out Boy; Linkin Park	**Chris Brown**; Bow Wow; Soulja Boy; Justin Timberlake
Favorite Female Singer	Favorite Song
**Miley Cyrus**; Beyoncé; Fergie; Alicia Keys	**"Girlfriend"** – Avril Lavigne; "Beautiful Girls" – Sean Kingston; "Big Girls Don't Cry" – Fergie; "Don't Matter" – Akon

=== Sports ===
Favorite Male Athlete	Favorite Female Athlete
**Tony Hawk**; Shaquille O'Neal; Alex Rodriguez; Tiger Woods	**Danica Patrick**; Cheryl Ford; Serena Williams; Venus Williams

=== Miscellaneous ===
Favorite Video Game	Favorite Book
**Madden NFL '08**; Dance Dance Revolution: Hottest Party; Guitar Hero III; High School Musical: Sing It!	**Harry Potter series**; Buffy the Vampire Slayer Season Eight; Diary of a Wimpy Kid; How to Eat Fried Worms

==== Wannabe Award ====
- **Cameron Diaz**

== The Rocktopus ==
The Rocktopus is an eight legged octopus of rock n' roll who haunts Jack Black in his dreams. Later during the awards show, they settle their differences in time for the Rocktopus to activate the slimer machine.

== iCarly: Live From Hollywood ==
The iCarly cast was live outside the Pauley Pavilion in Hollywood, where the 2008 Kids' Choice Awards were held. The cast aired from 9/8c - 11/10c. Carly, Sam, Freddie, and Spencer were at the Kids' Choice Awards because Spencer was hired to make a Kids' Choice Awards Blimp out of Wieners. Although Spencer was working on his sculpture, he happened to peek around the show, like the Gift bags for the Celebrities, going into Jack Black's Dressing Room, and stealing some mini wienies from the Snack table. In the end, his sculpture was destroyed when the Snack lady attacked him. People actually believed that it was a fan who destroyed the sculpture as security tackled the Snack Lady.

== Musical Guests ==
Countdown to Kids' Choice:

- Lil' Mama - Shawty Get Loose

The Show:

- The Naked Brothers Band, "I Don't Want To Go to School"
- Miley Cyrus, "G.N.O. (Girl's Night Out)"
