= 2012 Kids' Choice Awards =

Children's television awards show program broadcast in 2012

- Date: March 31, 2012
- Location: USC Galen Center, University Park, Los Angeles
- Hosted by: Will Smith

Television/radio coverage
- Network: Nickelodeon
- Runtime: 90 minutes (8-9:30 p.m. ET/PT)
- Viewership: 6.16 million
- Produced by: Paul Flattery
- Directed by: Joe DeMaio

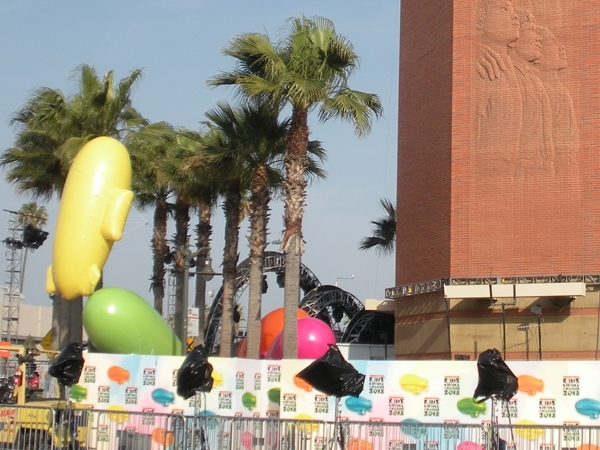
The Orange Carpet and pre-show stage under construction at the corner of Figueroa Street and Jefferson Boulevard, in Los Angeles

The 25th Annual Nickelodeon Kids' Choice Awards was held on March 31, 2012, at 8 p.m. ET in Los Angeles, California, in the United States, where the winners received an orange-colored blimp trophy. Big Help Award winner Taylor Swift received a special silver-colored blimp from First Lady Michelle Obama. The complete list of nominees for the 2012 Kids' Choice Awards was released on January 11, 2012, leading up to the release of Men in Black 3 on May 25, 2012. The event was hosted by MIB 3 star Will Smith, who with ten KCA blimps has won the most awards in previous telecasts. A record-breaking 223 million votes for favorites in 20 categories were cast during this year's voting period, up 11% over last year's votes.

The show was viewed by 6.16 million, leading all cable programs for the week ending April 1, 2012.

== Presenters, performers, and stunts ==
The show commenced with host Will Smith jumping with a parachute from a branded blimp.

=== Host ===
- Will Smith
- Zach Sang, Jeff Sutphen and Daniella Monet - Pre-show Hosts

=== Creepy Voice ===
- CeeLo Green

=== Presenters ===
- Halle Berry
- Chris Colfer
- Miranda Cosgrove
- Robert Downey Jr.
- Zac Efron
- Andrew Garfield
- Jada Pinkett Smith
- Josh Hutcherson
- Jaden Smith
- Keke Palmer
- Nolan Gould
- Ariel Winter
- Heidi Klum
- Ludacris
- Jennette McCurdy
- Cody Simpson
- Sarah Hyland
- Nicki Minaj
- Michelle Obama
- Chris Rock
- Emma Stone
- Willow Smith
- Lucas Cruikshank
- Reinaldo Zavarce

=== Performers ===
- Katy Perry - "Part of Me"
- One Direction - "What Makes You Beautiful"

==== Pre-show ====
- Before the ceremonies and on the "Orange Carpet", Keke Palmer and Max Schneider performed "Me and You Against the World" from their upcoming movie Rags.

=== Announcer ===
- Tom Kenny

=== Special appearances ===
- Justin Bieber
- CeeLo Green

== Winners and nominees ==
The nominations were announced on February 16, 2012. The winners are listed below, in bold.

=== Movies ===
Favorite Movie	Favorite Movie Actor
**Alvin and the Chipmunks: Chipwrecked**; Harry Potter and the Deathly Hallows – Part 2; The Muppets; The Smurfs	**Adam Sandler** as Jack Sadelstein/Jill Sadelstein for Jack and Jill; Jim Carrey as Thomas "Tom" Popper Jr. for Mr. Popper's Penguins; Johnny Depp as Jack Sparrow for Pirates of the Caribbean: On Stranger Tides; Daniel Radcliffe as Harry Potter for Harry Potter and the Deathly Hallows – Part 2
Favorite Movie Actress	Favorite Animated Movie
**Kristen Stewart** as Bella Swan for The Twilight Saga: Breaking Dawn - Part 1; Amy Adams as Mary for The Muppets; Sofia Vergara as Odile for The Smurfs; Emma Watson as Hermione Granger for Harry Potter and the Deathly Hallows – Part 2	**Puss in Boots**; Cars 2; Kung Fu Panda 2; Rio
Favorite Voice From an Animated Movie
**Katy Perry** as Smurfette for The Smurfs; Antonio Banderas as Puss in Boots for Puss in Boots; Jack Black as Po for Kung Fu Panda 2; Johnny Depp as Rango for Rango

=== Television ===
Favorite TV Show	Favorite TV Actor
**Victorious**; Good Luck Charlie; iCarly; Wizards of Waverly Place	**Jake Short** as Fletcher Quimby for A.N.T. Farm; Tim Allen as Mike Baxter for Last Man Standing; Ty Burrell as Phil Dunphy for Modern Family; Alex Heartman as Jayden for Power Rangers Samurai
Favorite TV Actress	Favorite TV Sidekick
**Selena Gomez** as Alex Russo for Wizards of Waverly Place; Miranda Cosgrove as Carly Shay for iCarly; Victoria Justice as Tori Vega for Victorious; Bridgit Mendler as Teddy Duncan for Good Luck Charlie	**Jennette McCurdy** as Sam Puckett for iCarly; Nathan Kress as Freddie Benson for iCarly; Jennifer Stone as Harper Finkle for Wizards of Waverly Place; Jerry Trainor as Spencer Shay for iCarly
Favorite Reality Show	Favorite Cartoon
**Wipeout**; American Idol; America's Funniest Home Videos; America's Got Talent	**SpongeBob SquarePants**; Kung Fu Panda: Legends of Awesomeness; Phineas and Ferb; Scooby-Doo! Mystery Incorporated

=== Music ===
Favorite Music Group	Favorite Male Singer
**Big Time Rush**; The Black Eyed Peas; Lady Antebellum; LMFAO	**Justin Bieber**; Toby Keith; Bruno Mars; Usher
Favorite Female Singer	Favorite Song
**Selena Gomez**; Lady Gaga; Katy Perry; Taylor Swift	**"Party Rock Anthem"** by LMFAO; "Born This Way" by Lady Gaga; "Firework" by Katy Perry; "Sparks Fly" by Taylor Swift

=== Sports ===
Favorite Male Athlete	Favorite Female Athlete
**Tim Tebow**; Derek Jeter; Michael Phelps; Shaun White	**Danica Patrick**; Kelly Clark; Serena Williams; Venus Williams

=== Miscellaneous ===
Favorite Book	Favorite Video Game
**Diary of a Wimpy Kid**; Harry Potter series; Hunger Games series; Twilight series	**Just Dance 3**; Lego Star Wars: The Complete Saga; Mario Kart 7; Super Mario Galaxy
Favorite Buttkicker
**Taylor Lautner**; Jessica Alba; Tom Cruise; Kelly Kelly

==== Big Help Award ====
- **Taylor Swift**

== International ==
=== Regional Awards ===
==== Favourite Asian Act ====
- Agnes Monica (Indonesia)
- Charice (The Philippines) (Winner)
- Wonder Girls (South Korea)
- Yuna (Malaysia)

==== Favorite Brazilian Artist ====
- Julie e os Fantasmas
- Manu Gavassi
- NX Zero
- Restart (Winner)

==== Favorite Latin Artist ====
- Alfonso Herrera
- Danna Paola
- Dulce María
- Isabella Castillo (Winner)

==== UK Categories ====
The UK had seven unique categories this year including Favorite UK Band, Favorite UK TV Show and more.

== Events within the show ==
=== Slime stunts ===
- Slime Wrestling Championship – The Big Show defeated The Miz

=== Slimed celebrities ===
In a pre-show promo, Smith slimed Victoria Justice, Daniel Radcliffe, and Shaun White; Will Smith engaged in a slime fight with Cameron Diaz. In a special during the show music video, Big Time Rush was slimed during the video in the audience.

During the show:

- Halle Berry – After being accused of being the "Creepy Voice", she sat down in what Will Smith called the "best seat in the house ... perfect seat". Afterwards she was slimed when a person behind her dumped a bucket of it on her.
- Chris Colfer – During the presentation of favorite TV actress, the special "Exploding Blimp" was placed in front of Chris Colfer and Heidi Klum; then the blimp went off covering the Glee star in slime; Heidi was lightly slimed.
- Heidi Klum – During the unveiling of favorite TV actress, Heidi was lightly slimed when Chris Colfer was drenched in a torrent of slime.
- Taylor Lautner – After winning a push-up contest against Will Smith, his special reward was a hose-down of green slime.
- Justin Bieber – At center stage, Will Smith asked him who "the secret celebrity who wants to be slimed," and told him "It's you!"; afterwards big jets of slime shot at the two celebrities and covered them in green goo.
- Will Smith – Even though he was slimed during a promo of the 2012 KCAs; at the end of the show, Will too was slimed while trying to hide behind Bieber.
- The Miz – At the end of the special slime championship, The Miz lost to The Big Show and was thrown over the edge of the ring and into a pool of slime.
- The Big Show – After beating The Miz, The Big Show and Jeff Sutphen had a hose-down of green slime; afterwards he slipped on the slime and fell down.
- Jeff Sutphen – After presenting The Big Show with his special KCA belt, he and The Big Show were hosed down in a torrent of green slime.
- Santino Marella - Santino was the referee and announcer for the slime championship. After The Big Show had won against The Miz, he jumped into the pool of slime that The Miz had been thrown in.
