= 2013 Kids' Choice Awards =

Children's television awards show program broadcast in 2013

- Date: March 23, 2013
- Location: USC Galen Center, University Park, Los Angeles
- Hosted by: Josh Duhamel

Television/radio coverage
- Network: Nickelodeon
- Runtime: 90 minutes
- Viewership: 5.82 million
- Produced by: Paul Flattery
- Directed by: Joe DeMaio

The 26th Annual Nickelodeon Kids' Choice Awards was held on March 23, 2013, at the Galen Center in Los Angeles, California. Actor Josh Duhamel hosted the ceremony. The "Orange Carpet" was set up in front of Galen Center on the sidewalks of Jefferson Boulevard. Voting on the 22 categories began on Thursday, February 14, 2013.

== Presenters and performers, and stunts ==
=== Host ===
- Josh Duhamel
- Daniella Monet and cast of Nick Studio 10 (pre-show interstitials)

=== Musical performers ===
- Pitbull and Christina Aguilera – "Feel This Moment"
- Kesha – "We R Who We R" / "C'Mon"

=== Presenters ===
- Jessica Alba
- Big Time Rush
- Sandra Bullock
- Steve Carell
- Miranda Cosgrove
- Lucas Cruikshank
- Kaley Cuoco
- Gabby Douglas
- Ariana Grande
- Lucy Hale
- Neil Patrick Harris
- Zachary Gordon
- Dwight Howard
- Logan Lerman
- Jennette McCurdy
- Cast of See Dad Run
- Cory Monteith
- Kevin Hart
- Jaden Smith
- Ashley Tisdale
- Kristen Wiig

=== Guest appearances ===
- Amanda Seyfried
- Josh Hutcherson
- Fergie
- Steven Tyler
- Scott Baio
- Megan Fox
- Jerry Trainor
- Nick Cannon
- Rico Rodriguez
- Darren Criss
- Melissa Benoist
- Mike "The Miz" Mizanin
- Maryse Ouellet
- Dwayne Johnson
- Sophia Grace and Rosie
- Mub and Grub from Epic (voiced by Aziz Ansari and Chris O'Dowd)

== Winners and nominees ==
Winners are listed first, in bold. Other nominees are in alphabetical order.

=== Movies ===
Favorite Movie	Favorite Movie Actor
**The Hunger Games**; The Amazing Spider-Man; The Avengers; Diary of a Wimpy Kid: Dog Days	**Johnny Depp** – Dark Shadows as Barnabas Collins; Andrew Garfield – The Amazing Spider-Man as Peter Parker / Spider-Man; Zachary Gordon – Diary of a Wimpy Kid: Dog Days as Gregory "Greg" Heffley; Will Smith – Men in Black 3 as James Darrell Edwards III / Agent J
Favorite Movie Actress	Favorite Animated Movie
**Kristen Stewart** – The Twilight Saga: Breaking Dawn – Part 2 as Isabella "Bella" Cullen; Vanessa Hudgens – Journey 2: The Mysterious Island as Kailani Laguatan; Scarlett Johansson – The Avengers as Natasha Romanoff / Black Widow; Jennifer Lawrence – The Hunger Games as Katniss Everdeen	**Wreck-It Ralph**; Brave; Ice Age: Continental Drift; Madagascar 3: Europe's Most Wanted
Favorite Voice From an Animated Movie	Favorite Male Buttkicker
**Adam Sandler** – Hotel Transylvania as Count Dracula; Chris Rock – Madagascar 3: Europe's Most Wanted as Marty; Ben Stiller – Madagascar 3: Europe's Most Wanted as Alex; Taylor Swift – The Lorax as Aubrey	**Dwayne Johnson** – Journey 2: The Mysterious Island as Hank Parsons; Robert Downey Jr. – The Avengers as Tony Stark / Iron Man; Andrew Garfield – The Amazing Spider-Man as Peter Parker / Spider-Man; Chris Hemsworth – The Avengers as Thor
Favorite Female Buttkicker
**Kristen Stewart** – Snow White and the Huntsman as Snow White; Anne Hathaway – The Dark Knight Rises as Selina Kyle / Catwoman; Scarlett Johansson – The Avengers as Natasha Romanoff / Black Widow; Jennifer Lawrence – The Hunger Games as Katniss Everdeen

=== Television ===
Favorite TV Show	Favorite TV Actor
**Victorious**; Good Luck Charlie; iCarly; Wizards of Waverly Place	**Ross Lynch** – Austin & Ally as Austin Moon; Jake T. Austin – Wizards of Waverly Place as Max Russo; Lucas Cruikshank – Marvin Marvin as Marvin Forman; Carlos Pena Jr. – Big Time Rush as Carlos Garcia
Favorite TV Actress	Favorite Reality Show
**Selena Gomez** – Wizards of Waverly Place as Alex Russo; Miranda Cosgrove – iCarly as Carly Shay; Victoria Justice – Victorious as Tori Vega; Bridgit Mendler – Good Luck Charlie as Teddy Duncan	**Wipeout**; America's Got Talent; American Idol; The Voice
Favorite Cartoon
**SpongeBob SquarePants**; The Fairly OddParents; Phineas and Ferb; Tom and Jerry

=== Music ===
Favorite Music Group	Favorite Male Singer
**One Direction**; Big Time Rush; Bon Jovi; Maroon 5	**Justin Bieber**; Bruno Mars; Blake Shelton; Usher
Favorite Female Singer	Favorite Song
**Katy Perry**; Adele; P!nk; Taylor Swift	**"What Makes You Beautiful"** – One Direction; "Call Me Maybe" – Carly Rae Jepsen; "Gangnam Style" – PSY; "We Are Never Ever Getting Back Together" – Taylor Swift

=== Sports ===
Favorite Male Athlete	Favorite Female Athlete
**LeBron James**; Michael Phelps; Tim Tebow; Shaun White	**Danica Patrick**; Gabby Douglas; Serena Williams; Venus Williams

=== Miscellaneous ===
Favorite Villain	Favorite Book
**Simon Cowell** – The X Factor as Himself; Reed Alexander – iCarly as Nevel Papperman; Tom Hiddleston – The Avengers as Loki; Julia Roberts – Mirror Mirror as Queen Clementianna	**The Hunger Games series**; Diary of a Wimpy Kid series; Harry Potter series; Magic Tree House series
Favorite App	Favorite Video Game
**Temple Run**; Angry Birds; Fruit Ninja; Minecraft	**Just Dance 4**; Mario Kart 7; Skylanders Giants; Wii Sports

== Events within the show ==
=== Slimed Celebrities ===
In a pre-show promo, Josh Duhamel was slimed while revealing that he was the 2013 Kids' Choice Awards' host. Duhamel was also seen bathing in a bathtub full of slime during the promo. During the show, Josh Hutcherson, Amanda Seyfried, and a group of kids appeared in a special green room to advertise the upcoming movie "Epic". They were slimed by Mub and Grub from the movie.

During the Show:

- Pitbull – During the opening of the show, Pitbull and Christina Aguilera performed "Feel This Moment". Once the performance ended, Pitbull was drenched in a torrent of slime caused by Christina pushing a button.
- Dwight Howard – Josh Duhamel challenged Dwight Howard to a basketball dunking competition. Duhamel made one dunk and Howard made the other and told him how it was supposed to be done. After Howard's dunk, the basketball hoop rained green slime on the famed basketball star.
- Neil Patrick Harris and Sandra Bullock – During Neil Patrick Harris and Sandra Bullock's presentation, the two stars were covered in green slime while trying figuring out was Harris' special magic wand could do.
- Josh Duhamel and Nick Cannon – At the end of the show, Duhamel and Cannon took part in a special zip line stunt to reveal the winner of "Best Male Buttkicker". After Dwayne Johnson won the award, he surprised the two stars with a grand finale of green slime all over them and the audience near the stage.

== International distribution ==
=== Regional awards ===
==== Favorite Asian Act (Asia) ====
- Shila Amzah
- Han Geng (winner)
- Psy
- Sarah Geronimo

==== Favorite Star (Germany/Austria/Switzerland) ====
- Lena Meyer-Landrut
- Daniele Negroni
- Luca Hänni (winner)
- Cro

==== Favorite Latin Artist (Latin America) ====
- Isabella Castillo (winner, 2nd time in a row)
- Eme 15
- Martina Stoessel
- Danna Paola

==== Favorite Star (Netherlands/Belgium) ====
- Ferry Doedens
- Gers Pardoel (winner)
- Britt Dekker
- Epke Zonderland
