= Characters of Henry Danger and Danger Force =

Henry Danger is an American comedy television series created by Dan Schneider and Dana Olsen that aired on Nickelodeon from July 26, 2014, to March 21, 2020, while Danger Force is developed by Christpher J. Nowak based on the characters by Schneider and Olsen that aired on Nickelodeon from March 28, 2020 to February 21, 2024. Henry Danger stars Jace Norman, Cooper Barnes, Riele Downs, Sean Ryan Fox, Ella Anderson, and Michael D. Cohen and Danger Force stars Cooper Barnes and Michael D. Cohen, Havan Flores, Terrence Little Gardenhigh, Dana Heath, and Luca Luhan. Included in this list are the characters that appear in Henry Danger, Danger Force, The Adventures of Kid Danger, and the television film Henry Danger: The Movie.

== Overview ==
Actor	Character	Henry Danger					Danger Force			The Movie
Actor	Character	1	2	3	4	5	1	2	3	The Movie
Jace Norman	Henry Hart / Kid Danger	Main	Main	Main	Main	Main	Guest	Guest	Guest	Starring
Cooper Barnes	Ray Manchester / Captain Man	Main	Main	Main	Main	Main	Main	Main	Main	Special Appearance
Riele Downs	Charlotte Page	Main	Main	Main	Main	Main				
Sean Ryan Fox	Jasper Dunlop	Main	Main	Main	Main	Main				Starring
Ella Anderson	Piper Hart	Main	Main	Main	Main	Main				Starring
Michael D. Cohen	Schwoz	Recurring	Recurring	Recurring	Recurring	Main	Main	Main	Main	Starring
Havan Flores	Chapa					Recurring	Main	Main	Main	
Terrence Little Gardenhigh	Miles					Recurring	Main	Main	Main	
Dana Heath	Mika					Recurring	Main	Main	Main	
Luca Luhan	Bose					Recurring	Main	Main	Main	
Glee Dango	Missy Martin / Superfan									Starring

== Main ==
Main characters from Henry Danger. From left to right: Piper, Captain Man, Henry, Charlotte and Jasper (use cursor to identify)

=== Henry Hart / Kid Danger ===
Henry Hart / Kid Danger (Jace Norman) is a 13-year-old boy who becomes the sidekick of Captain Man. He is an average kid with friends and has an after school job as Captain Man's superhero sidekick. Thanks to his skills and gadgets, Kid Danger has no problem helping Captain Man on his missions. In the episode "Hour of Power", Henry gains superhuman reflexes, an ability dubbed "Hyper-Motility", after breathing the fumes of a foreign lizard and a black shag spider during a battle with Drex. In "Part 3: A New Hero", he loses his powers after using an antivirus to save the Internet. Henry quits his job in the episode, "The Beginning of the End". In "The Fate of Danger: Part 2", Henry gains the ability to create a force field around his body that is able to repel objects. In the same episode, Henry, Charlotte and Jasper leave Swellview and move to fight crime in the town of Dystopia.

=== Ray Manchester / Captain Man ===
Ray Manchester / Captain Man (Cooper Barnes) is a superhero who trains Henry. About 25 years ago, Ray accidentally crashed into the Trans-Molecular Densitizer created by his father Carl while riding his skateboard, giving him indestructibility and an increased tolerance to pain. Kale Culley portrays a younger version of Ray in the episode "Back to the Danger: Part 2". In "The Fate of Danger: Part 2", Ray and Schwoz open the Swellview Academy for the Gifted or S.W.A.G. for short, with Ray leading and training a young group of new superheroes. In "The Battle for Swellview", Ray retires to live with Credenza, handing over protection of Swellview to his sidekicks.

=== Charlotte ===
Charlotte Page (Riele Downs) is one of Henry's best friends. She is sarcastic and the "sass master" of the bunch, always there to snap everyone back to reality. In the fourth episode, Charlotte figures out Henry's secret and gets a job as an information assistant for Captain Man and Kid Danger. In "The Fate of Danger: Part 2", Charlotte leaves Swellview with Henry and Jasper to fight crime in the town of Dystopia, showing that she has become a cyborg.

=== Jasper Dunlop ===
Jasper Dunlop (Sean Ryan Fox) is one of Henry's best friends. He is full of ideas, but most of them are not good. He has been Henry's best friend since preschool. In the episode "I Know Your Secret", Henry reveals to Jasper that he is Kid Danger, and is taken into the business. In "The Fate of Danger: Part 1", Jasper gains the ability of Esperanto Sleep Fighting while fighting the cavemen army. In, "The Fate of Danger: Part 2", Jasper leaves Swellview with Henry and Charlotte to fight crime in the town of Dystopia.

=== Piper Hart ===
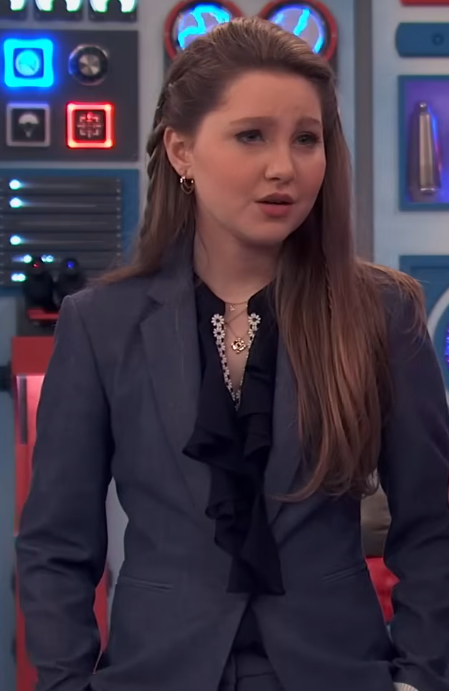
Piper Hart

Piper Hart (Ella Anderson) is Henry's little sister who is a fan of Captain Man. She is fearless and even aggressive, but does have a softer side. Piper is also shown to be annoyed with Jasper's antics and seems to have a big rivalry with him. In the episode "Sister Twister", Piper discovers Kid Danger and Captain Man's secret identities after falling into the Man Cave. She becomes a member of the team after she helps Ray get his memory back, despite Henry's reluctance. In "A Tale of Two Pipers" it is revealed that Piper will become a leader of a resistance group against cyborg children in the future and that both Henry and Ray trained her. In "The Fate of Danger: Part II", Piper goes to attend college in Florida.

=== Schwoz ===
Schwoz Schwartz (Michael D. Cohen) is Captain Man's worker and closest friend, who created the equipment in the Man Cave. Schwoz is highly intelligent with extensive knowledge in engineering, mechanics, computer science and medicine. He also had a shape-shifting android as his "girlfriend" and in "Grand Theft Otto", it's revealed that Schwoz had cloned himself. He becomes a main character in the fifth season. In "The Fate of Danger: Part 2", he and Ray open the Swellview Academy for the Gifted, or SW.A.G. for short, helping Ray train a new team of superheroes. In "The Battle for Swellview", Schwoz finally abandons Ray and the Danger Force to start a new life with Princess Daphne.

=== Chapa ===
Chapa (Havan Flores) is a girl who debuted in the Henry Danger episode "Game of Phones", asking for help from Captain Man and Kid Danger to find her stolen cell phone, later returning in the series finale "The Fate of Danger", where she gains the ability of electrokinesis. She becomes one of the main characters in the spinoff Danger Force as a superheroine named Volt. She is often grumpy, and with a violent attitude.

=== Miles ===
Miles Macklin (Terrence Little Gardenhigh) is the twin brother of Mika. He debuted in the Henry Danger episode "Escape Room", where he tries to get out with Ray, Henry and Mika from an escape room, later returning in the series finale "The Fate of Danger", where he develops the power of teleportation. He becomes one of the main characters in the spinoff Danger Force as a superhero named AWOL. He has a positive and laid-back personality, which often makes him hope that problems will take care of themselves. In "Miles Has Visions", he develops the ability of precognition, giving him visions of the future at random.

=== Mika ===
Mika Macklin (Dana Heath) is the twin sister of Miles. She debuted in the Henry Danger episode "Escape Room", where she tries to get out with Ray, Henry and Miles from an escape room. Mika later appears in the series finale "The Fate of Danger", where she develops a sonic scream. She becomes one of the main characters in the spinoff Danger Force as a superheroine named ShoutOut. She is shown to be the smarter and more responsible member of Danger Force, though she can lose her temper when it comes to outdoing others.

=== Bose ===
Bose O'Brian (Luca Luhan) is the ditzy stepson of Vice-Mayor Willard, who helps Captain Man and Kid Danger in the last four episodes of Henry Danger. In the series finale "The Fate of Danger", Bose gains the power of telekinesis. He becomes one of the main characters in the spinoff Danger Force as a superhero named Brainstorm.

=== Missy Martin ===
Missy (Glee Dango) is a big fan of Kid Danger who dreams of becoming his sidekick who was introduced in Henry Danger: The Movie. In an attempt to bring him back upon thinking that he died, Missy ended up involving him in a great adventure through her fictional stories after she made off with the R.A.D. (short for Reality Altering Device) from Evil Science Corp.

== Recurring ==
=== Gooch ===
Gooch (Duncan Bravo) is the cashier at "Junk 'n' Stuff", a store that secretly houses the Man Cave. He alerts Captain Man of any dangers in Swellview. He also has a young nephew named Benjy and a pet carnivorous plant named Omar. His last appearance is in the first-season episode "Captain Jerk", with later episodes having his position handled by Jasper.

=== Mr. Hart / Jake ===
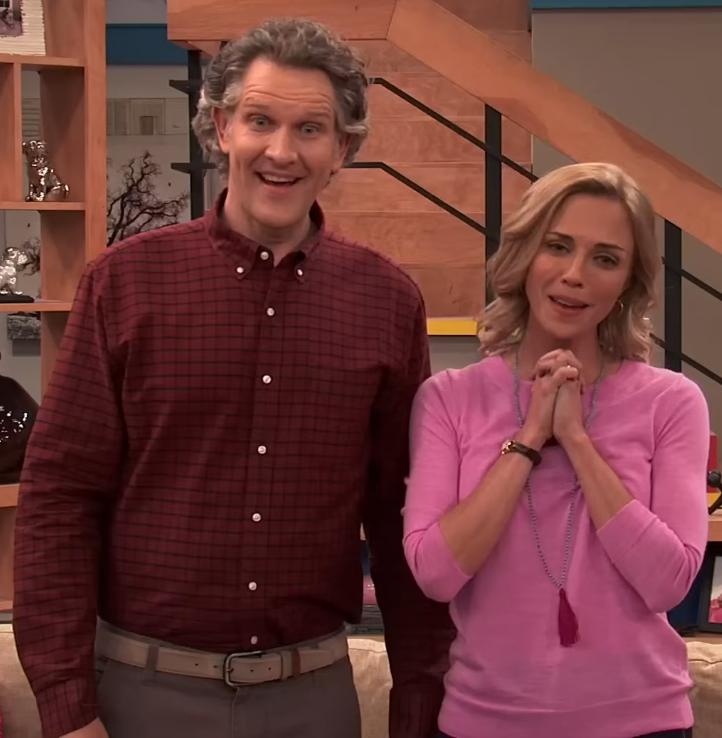
Jake Hart alongside his wife Kris

Mr. Hart / Jake (Jeffrey Nicholas Brown) (Note: Was listed as "starring" in the end credits of the pilot episode: "The Danger Begins".) is Henry and Piper's father, who works as a project manager. He is described to have a loving, caring, and childish personality. In the final episodes, he learns that Henry is Kid Danger during Drex's latest plot.

=== Mrs. Hart / Kris ===
Mrs. Hart / Kris (Kelly Sullivan) is Henry and Piper's mother. She is oblivious to the fact that Captain Man has a crush on her. In the final episodes, she learns that Henry is Kid Danger during Drex's latest plot as well as her knowledge that Ray likes her.

=== Sidney ===
Sidney (Joe Kaprielian) is a boy who shares similar personality traits with his best friend Oliver.

=== Oliver Pook ===
Oliver Pook (Matthew Zhang) is a strange and quirky boy. He is the best friend of Sidney and shares a similar interest in odd clothing.

=== The Toddler ===
The Toddler (Ben Giroux) is a villain who has dwarfism and uses a baby motif. He was the first villain who Kid Danger faced with Captain Man. He was defeated after falling into a bottomless ball pit. In the episode "Danger & Thunder", it is revealed that Toddler fell to the center of the Earth, but managed to survive and tunnel his way back to the surface.

=== Miss Shapen ===
Miss Sharona Shapen (Jill Benjamin) is Henry's history teacher at Swellview Junior High. She is known to ask Henry for advice on dating as she can never get a successful date. In "Double Date Danger", it is revealed that Shapen has a niece named Noelle who worked for Drill Finger.

She is extremely lazy and reluctant to do what she is paid to do, and is far from being a "perfect" teacher, to the point that she can be bribed into giving good marks (in the episode "My Phony Valentine") or can encourage students to cheat in order to have good marks on a teacher evaluation test.

In the Danger Force episode "The Danger Force Awakens", Shapen was fired from her teaching job at Swellview Junior High and is now working for the city as a school inspector.

=== Dr. Minyak ===
Dr. Minyak (Mike Ostroki) is a mad scientist. In "Tears of the Jolly Beetle", he knows Captain Man's weakness and uses the jolly beetle's tears against him to reduce his strength. In "Quaran-kini", it is revealed that his full name is Horatio Minyak.

=== Nurse Cohort ===
Nurse Cohort (Amber Bela Muse) is Dr. Minyak's assistant.

In "Danger & Thunder", Nurse Cohort was among the villains assembled by Toddler in his plot to dispose of Captain Man and Kid Danger.

In "Balloons of Doom", Nurse Cohort assists Dr. Minyak in holding the Man Fans hostage.

=== Vice Mayor Willard ===
Vice Mayor Willard (Timothy Brennen) is the vice mayor of Swellview.

The episode "Budget Cuts" reveals that he has a niece named Cassie.

In "The Beginning of the End," Willard becomes the stepfather of Bose when he marries Bose's mother. He has Captain Man and Kid Danger watch over Bose in exchange that he will put up a statue of them if they do a good job.

=== Mary Gaperman ===
Mary Gaperman (Carrie Barrett) is the co-anchor of Trent at KLVY. She gets annoyed at Trent when he interrupts or changes the subject on her while speaking on the news.

=== Trent Overunder ===
Trent Overunder (Winston Story) is a newsman on KLVY who reports on the activities in Swellview, which include Captain Man's heroic activities.

=== Drill Finger ===
Drill Finger (Daniel Kaemon) is a psychotic evil dentist who commits crimes relating to teeth. He is recognizable for his curly hair, purple mask and a dental drill for a finger.

=== Jeff ===
Jeff (Ryan Grassmeyer) is a dimwitted petty criminal who often gets busted by Captain Man. In "The Whole Bilsky Family" it is revealed that his last name is Bilsky and he is Mitch's older brother.

In Danger Force, Jeff has done various criminal activities since escaping from prison in the first episode like attempting to rob a convenience store, collaborated with Toddler to steal the Man Buggy, attempted to ruin Mitch's class, and targeting Duke Wellington's ponytail. In "Dumber Force", Jeff joins the Cell as Number 24601 where he worked as a janitor and was instructed by Mitch to buy Swellview High School. A running gag in this appearance was that Jeff kept comparing people to cavemen which offended a caveman member of the Cell named Grog who operates as Number 6.

=== Mitch ===
Mitch (Andrew Caldwell), commonly referred to by his full name Mitch Bilsky, is a school bully who picks on Henry and others. In "The Whole Bilsky Family", it is revealed that Jeff is his older brother.

In the Danger Force episode "Bottle Snatchers", Mitch leads the Bottle Snatchers in a plan to infiltrate Club Soda in order to steal the Gold Soda. In "Bilsky's Billions", ShoutOut persuades Judge Tootie to allow Mitch to graduate high school by taking lessons at SW.A.G. Despite Jeff's attempts to sabotage him, Mitch successfully graduates with help from Ray Manchester, Chapa, Mika, Miles, and Bose.

=== Bianca ===
Bianca (Maeve Tomalty) is Henry's ex-girlfriend. She is a popular girl in Swellview Junior High. Like Chloe, she later become a reality star in the show "Kids in the Woods".

=== Drex ===
Drex (Tommy Walker) is Captain Man's original sidekick, who became vengeful after being confined in the Man Cave. Years later, Drex is accidentally released from prison by the parole board chairman's daughter after she gets into the prison's computer system. Drex begins his plan of revenge against Captain Man and even causes trouble for Kid Danger. In order to defeat Drex, Kid Danger is given new superpowers, who allows Kid Danger to overpower Drex. Drex is imprisoned in the Man Cave.

In "Back to the Danger," Drex is accidentally freed when Vice-Mayor Willard briefly shuts off all power in Swellview. Using Time Jerker's time machine, Drex goes back in time to prevent Ray from getting his powers. During the conflict, Drex is exposed to the same process that empowered Ray, gaining invulnerability and a reptilian left hand. Captain Man and Kid Danger are able to send Drex to prehistoric times.

In the final four episodes of the series, Drex is shown to have befriended a tribe of cavemen while stranded in the past and swayed them to his side. Drex and the cavemen survive to the present day by preserving themselves in ice. His plans are thwarted by Captain Man and Kid Danger as the drone that Jasper controls drops Drex off at Swellview Prison. After being exposed to the omega weapon, Drex loses his invulnerability, but retains his reptilian hand.

In Danger Force, Drex is imprisoned in the Man's Nest until he is freed by Rick Twittler. In the episode "Ray Forgives", Miles persuades Ray to forgive Drex, baiting him with an operation file that will remove his reptilian hand. It is also revealed that he is Credenza Fudgers' ex-husband and father of Buddy Fudgers, also known as Lil' Dynomite. In "The Battle of Swellview", Drex is attacked by the hero slayer, who absorbs his soul. After the hero slayer is defeated, Drex is restored to life, which restores his hand in the process. After Ray goes to live on a boat with Credenza, Drex gains custody of Buddy.

=== Frankini ===
Frankini (Frankie Grande) appears in "Live & Dangerous", "Captain Man-kini", and "Henry Danger: The Musical". He is an Internet celebrity; with the assistance of Goomer, he uses an illegal machine to control Kid Danger and Captain Man and tries to have them unmask themselves when he reaches 10,000,000 viewers. His plot is thwarted due to a blackout.

In the sequel series Danger Force, Frankini is among the inmates of Swellview Prison who are accidentally freed in "The Danger Force Awakens". In "Hey, Where's Schwoz?", Frankini was revealed to have joined the Cell as Number 8 while in prison, but left when he learned that they intended to fulfill a prophecy that would destroy Earth.

=== Goomer ===
Goomer (Zoran Korach) appears in "Live & Dangerous", "Captain Man-kini", and "Henry Danger: The Musical" He is the henchman of Frankini. Goomer mentions to Kid Danger and Captain Man that he used to be associated with Frankini's sister a long time ago. He is a returning character from Sam & Cat.

=== Rick Twitler ===
Rick Twitler (David Blue) is the creator of Twitflash and evil genius who seeks to shut down the Internet.

=== Angela ===
Angela (Nakia Burrise) is the mother of Mika and Miles.

=== Herman ===
Herman (Antonio D. Charity) the father of Mika and Miles.

=== Celia ===
Celia (Siobhan Murphy) is the mother of Bose and wife of Vice Mayor Willard. Like Bose, Celia has a ditzy personality.

=== Archduke Fernando ===
Archduke Fernando (Joe Gillette) is the Archduke of the neighbouring town Rivalton.

=== Lil' Dynomite ===
Lil' Dynomite / Buddy Fudgers (Mitchell Berg in normal form and Dark Dynomite, Tommy Walker as Big Dark Dynomite) is a wannabe sidekick. The Mayor of Neighborville offered to Kid Danger to have Lil' Dynomite to be his sidekick if he relocates to Neighborville.

It was later revealed in "Ray Forgives" that Buddy is the son of Drex. In "The Battle of Swellview", Buddy is possessed by the hero slayer, who takes the name Dark Dynomite and begins stealing the souls of others. With help from Credenza, Danger Force manage to exorcise the hero slayer from Lil' Dynomite and return it to space. Buddy goes to live with his father, who gains custody of him.

=== Credenza ===
Credenza Fudgers (Cheryl Texiera) is the mother of Buddy Fudgers, the ex-wife of Drex, and the love interest of Ray. Credenza is later revealed to be the leader of the Cell, who intend to fulfill a prophecy to destroy Earth. However, the Cell neglected to read the entirety of the prophecy, which stated that the hero slayer needed a teenage host. When the hero slayer possesses Lil' Dynomite, Credenza helps the Cell in exorcising Lil' Dynomite and returning the slayer to space. Credenza turns over a new leaf after going through the M.I.L.E.S. system with Ray as they leave to go live on a boat.

=== The Cell ===
The Cell is a mysterious villain cult who are the main antagonists of Danger Force season three. They seek to fulfill a prophecy that involves the end of the world. Each of its members wears an orange hoodie with a Roman numeral on it and wears an electronic mask that changes their voices (variously provided by Alex Bedria, Robert Dill, Todd Haberkorn, and Chris Tergliafera) to hide their identities.

In the episode "The Battle of Swellview", it is revealed that the Cell neglected to read the entirety of the prophecy, which stated that the hero slayer needed a teenage host. When the hero slayer possesses Lil' Dynomite, the Cell help exorcise Lil' Dynomite and return the slayer to space. Afterwards, the Cell goes on the run.

== Guest stars ==
=== Nathan ===
Nathan (Nathan Kress) appears in "Birthday Girl Down".

=== Shawn ===
Shawn (Russell Westbrook) appears in "Too Much Game". He is a young man who Coach Bix gets to pose as a teenager in order to get on his basketball team and replace Henry. Bix holds a basketball match to see who will stay on his basketball team and who will go. Despite Schwoz's gifts, Henry loses and Bix makes Shawn the replacement for Henry for the upcoming championship. Henry later learns from Shawn that Bix had captured his labradoodle to get Shawn to cooperate. Upon being informed of this, Captain Man imprisons Bix and returns Shawn's labradoodle to him.

=== Chloe ===
Chloe Hartman (Jade Pettyjohn) appears in "Henry the Man-Beast". She is a girl who is one of Henry's love interests. She later stars in the reality show "Kids in the Woods".

=== Invisible Brad ===
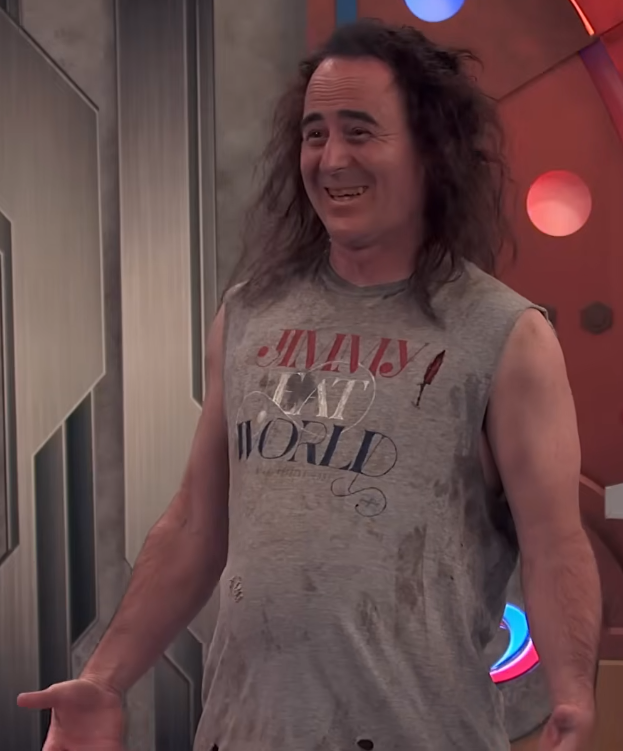
Invisible Brad in his visible form

Invisible Brad (voiced by Jake Farrow) appears in "Invisible Brad", Grave Danger and Visible Brad. He is a man who was accidentally turned invisible.

=== Li'l Biggie ===
Li'l Biggie (Benjamin Flores Jr.) appears in "The Beat Goes On". He is a holographic rapper used by Dr. Minyak to brainwash Charlotte.

=== Time Jerker ===
The Time Jerker (Joey Richter) is a manipulator of time, able to escape for long periods of time thanks to his time machine. He first appears in "The Time Jerker", in which Henry is accidentally trapped in a time loop after Captain Man and Kid Danger confront the Time Jerker. After breaking out of the time loop, Henry defeated Time Jerker.

In the Danger Force episode "Miles Has Visions", Time Jerker tries to go straight by opening an electronic store called Hooked Tronics. During this time, his real name is revealed to be Tim Jerkowski. When Danger Force accepts that Time Jerker has changed, his store is raided by Kyle, Take-Out, and Mr. Nice Guy in retaliation of the news that Time Jerker was going straight. The resulting fight between the three villains and Danger Force wrecks Hooked Tronics, causing Time Jerker to return to villainy.

=== Phoebe Thunderman / Thundergirl ===
Phoebe Thunderman (Kira Kosarin) appears in "Danger & Thunder". The character crosses over from The Thundermans. She comes to Swellview to assist Captain Man and Kid Danger while her parents have taken Nora, Billy and Chloe to a theme park. Thundergirl assisted Captain Man and Kid Danger against Toddler's villain alliance. It was mentioned in a discussion between Thundergirl and Captain Man that Thunderman is an old friend of Captain Man.

=== Max Thunderman ===
Max Thunderman (Jack Griffo) appears in "Danger & Thunder". The character crosses over from The Thundermans. He is Phoebe's twin brother. Max goes to Swellview and gets himself into Toddler's gathering of villains in order to get close to Dr. Minyak's latest weapon.

=== Jack Frittleman ===
Jack Frittleman (Alec Mapa) is the owner of the company Frittles. After his company's headquarters blown up twice, first in "The Trouble with Frittles" and second in "Henry's Frittle Problem", both times because of Captain Man and Kid Danger, he reappears in "Escape Room" as a villain trying to get revenge. In "The Fate of Danger: Part II", Jack Frittleman is among the villains attending Kid Danger's memorial.

In Danger Force, Jack Frittelman is seen in "The Danger Force Awakens" where he was among the villains who are accidentally freed from Swellview Prison.

=== Snoop Dogg ===
Snoop Dogg appears as himself in "Danger Games".

=== Shaun White ===
Shaun White appears as himself in "Toon in for Danger". He appears at the Hart family home, where the viewing party of the new Kid Danger and Captain Man cartoon is being held.

=== Joey ===
Joey (Jerry Trainor) appears in "Thumb War". He is one of the Thumb Buddies. He mentions to Kid Danger and Captain Man that he has a sister who speaks with a lisp.

In the Danger Force episode "The Danger Force Awakens", the Thumb Buddies are among the inmates who are accidentally freed from Swellview Penitentiary.

=== Arc ===
Arc (Owen Joyner) appears in "Knight & Danger". The character crosses over from Knight Squad. After being transported to Swellview from his dimension, he and Ciara help Captain Man and Kid Danger stop Ryker.

=== Ciara ===
Ciara (Daniella Perkins) appears in "Knight & Danger". The character crosses over Knight Squad. After being transported to Swellview from her dimension, she and Arc help Captain Man and Kid Danger stop Ryker.

=== Ryker ===
Ryker (Geno Segers) appears in "Knight & Danger". The character crosses over Knight Squad. He is the former ruler of Astoria from another reality who was accidentally brought to Captain Man's reality by Bill Evil following his last attempt to take over Astoria. While finding out that his magic does not work in this reality, Ryker tricked Captain Man and Kid Danger in helping him obtain weapons and getting back to his world. His plans are thwarted when Arc and Ciara reveal his true motives.

=== Deuce Van Nuys ===
Deuce Van Nuys (Mike Caron) is a movie director in Hollywood who hires the Danger Force to protect a movie which turns out to be fake.

=== That Girl Lay Lay ===
That Girl Lay Lay (portrayed by herself) is a movie star in Hollywood.
