= List of Henry Danger episodes =

Henry Danger is an American comedy television series created by Dan Schneider and Dana Olsen that aired on Nickelodeon from July 26, 2014 to March 21, 2020. The series stars Jace Norman, Cooper Barnes, Riele Downs, Sean Ryan Fox, Ella Anderson, and Michael D. Cohen.

== Series overview ==
Season	Episodes	Originally released	
Season	Episodes	First released	Last released
1	25	July 26, 2014	May 16, 2015
2	18	September 12, 2015	July 17, 2016
3	19	September 17, 2016	October 7, 2017
4	20	October 21, 2017	October 20, 2018
5	39	November 3, 2018	March 21, 2020

== Episodes ==
=== Season 1 (2014–15) ===
No. overall	No. in season	Title	Directed by	Written by	Original release date	Prod. code	U.S. viewers (millions)
1	1	"The Danger Begins"	Steve Hoefer	Dan Schneider & Dana Olsen	July 26, 2014	101–102	1.94
In the fictional town of Swellview, Henry Hart lands a job at a junk store named Junk-N-Stuff, where he meets Ray, who later reveals himself to be Captain Man, a man whose father accidentally made indestructible. He later appoints Henry as his sidekick and gives him the name "Kid Danger". He and Henry later save the town bridge from a man named The Toddler, who plans to turn all the babies in Swellview into monsters. While the town comes to know Kid Danger, Henry struggles with his persona after learning he must rescue Captain Man from The Toddler, missing his best friend, Jasper's, birthday party. The two defeat The Toddler and to make it up to Jasper, Henry invites Ray, dressed up as Captain Man, to Jasper's party. Starring: Jeffrey Nicholas Brown, Kelly Sullivan Guest stars: Duncan Bravo as Gooch, Ben Giroux as The Toddler
2	2	"Mo' Danger, Mo' Problems"	Steve Hoefer	Dan Schneider & Dana Olsen	September 13, 2014	103	1.57
In the middle of the night, Henry heads down to the Man Cave after he and Ray learn that a wine store is in the progress of being robbed. The two stop the burglar, but Henry struggles with staying awake throughout the day. Henry falls asleep while Ray does a mission alone. He awakens to Ray being in his room, but soon gets him out after his mom and his sister, Piper, walk in. Ray and his assistant, Gooch, use a device on Henry to keep him awake, but soon suffers from the supposed side effects. Guest stars: Jeffrey Nicholas Brown as Mr. Hart, Kelly Sullivan as Mrs. Hart, Duncan Bravo as Gooch, Jill Benjamin as Miss Shapen
3	3	"The Secret Gets Out"	Steve Hoefer	Dan Schneider & Jake Farrow	September 20, 2014	104	1.74
Charlotte figures out that Henry is Kid Danger and he confirms it, getting fired afterward. While this is going on, Ray is struggling to capture the phone shark, a well-known villain. To get Henry rehired, Charlotte comes up with a plan for him to capture the phone shark. Meanwhile, Jasper must serve Piper so that she does not upload the footage of him trying to sing The Cup Song. Guest stars: Duncan Bravo as Gooch, Briana Lane as Kelly
4	4	"Tears of the Jolly Beetle"	Russ Reinsel	Dan Schneider & Christopher J. Nowak	September 27, 2014	105	1.53
During an event held by Vice Mayor Willard, Captain Man becomes vulnerable to harm when someone sprays him with perfume containing tears of the jolly beetle. Henry traces the source of the jolly beetles to Dr. Minyak so that he and Captain Man can capture them and use the euphoric acid they release when they laugh to restore Captain Man's powers. Guest stars: Duncan Bravo as Gooch, Joe Kaprielian as Sidney, Amber Bela Muse as Nurse Cohort, Mike Ostroski as Dr. Minyak, Matthew Zhang as Oliver
5	5	"Substitute Teacher"	Russ Reinsel	Dan Schneider & Dave Malkoff	October 4, 2014	106	1.79
A new student named Ortho rises suspicions from Henry, but soon learns that he could be the son of a villain named The Dentist. Ray gives Henry's teacher the chicken pox using Gooch's son and steps in as an awkward substitute. He tells Ortho that the next day is "bring your dad to school day". When Ortho's dad arrives, Ray and Henry stun them with a device and question, but find out that he planned to build a retirement home in Swellview. Guest stars: Duncan Bravo as Gooch, Jill Benjamin as Miss Shapen, Trevor Gore as Ortho, JR Reed as Ortho's Dad, Matthew Zhang as Oliver
6	6	"Jasper Danger"	Steve Hoefer	Dan Schneider & Dana Olsen	October 18, 2014	107	1.62
Jasper dresses up as Kid Danger for Halloween to impress a girl named Monica since he had convinced her at school he was the real Kid Danger. After they finish trick-or-treating, Monica and Jasper spot someone breaking into a car. Jasper goes over to confront the criminal Jeff to stop him from stealing the car. Instead, Jeff takes him and Monica back to his house and refuses to let them go unless Captain Man brings him what he wants. Guest stars: Jeffrey Nicholas Brown as Mr. Hart, Kelly Sullivan as Mrs. Hart, Duncan Bravo as Gooch, Sedona Cohen as Monica, Ryan Grassmeyer as Jeff, Joe Kaprielian as Sidney, Matthew Zhang as Oliver
7	7	"The Space Rock"	Russ Reinsel	Dan Schneider & Jake Farrow	November 1, 2014	108	2.19
A space rock weighing 7,000 lb (3,175 kg) crashes on Earth and Henry, Charlotte, and Gooch try to move it with a crane. As they are moving it, the crane malfunctions and drops it. Henry goes back to work to grab his backpack and wonders why Ray and Gooch are acting unusual. Ray then tells Henry that the space rock is actually an egg and an alien creature is loose in the Man Cave. They try to find the creature, but Henry gives up and goes home. Henry goes upstairs while his mother tries to clean his backpack because there is goo in it. When she opens it, the alien comes out and she freaks out. Henry comes downstairs and his parents tell him an alien creature is in the house. Henry has Ray come over as Captain Man to try to shoot the creature, only for Henry to stop him because the creature is on his sister's face. When Piper runs outside from fear, Captain Man shoots the creature off her face. Guest stars: Jeffrey Nicholas Brown as Mr. Hart, Kelly Sullivan as Mrs. Hart, Duncan Bravo as Gooch, Matthew Zhang as Oliver
8	8	"Birthday Girl Down"	Adam Weissman	Dan Schneider & Christopher J. Nowak	November 8, 2014	109	1.67
Henry invites Jasper and Charlotte to Mini Golf, but she reveals that she and Jasper are heading to Debbie Dutch's birthday party. Henry begins to feel like an outcast as Debbie didn't invite him after he accidentally knocked her off the roof using an overpowered ball machine the year before. After coming to Ray about his problems, he receives a pizza from Debbie's mom, who invites him over to Debbie's party. Ray and Henry then decide to dress up as German sleuths and question everyone who attended the party the year before. They learn that they each have their own allegations against Debbie, so Ray has Henry investigate the pictures that photographer, Nathan, took at the party. At the party, Henry arrives to show Debbie pictures that reveal an angry Piper throwing her broken phone towards the "11" button the machine, which reveals how the machine had such strong power. As Debbie's parents apologize to Henry, he finds a balloon stuck on the light fixtures, so he heads up to retrieve it. He jumps on the trampoline below, which sends Debbie flying off the roof once more. Special guest star: Nathan Kress as Nathan Guest stars: Cassie Brennan as Debbie, Joe Kaprielian as Sidney, Lily Rains as Mrs. Putch, Matthew Zhang as Oliver
9	9	"Too Much Game"	Steve Hoefer	Dan Schneider & Dave Malkoff	November 15, 2014	110	2.38
Henry believes that he was replaced on the Swellview Honey Badgers basketball team by an older boy named Shawn Corbit, who has been recruited by Coach Bix. After losing a one-on-one match that determines who will be point guard, Shawn reveals to Henry that Coach Bix is holding Shawn's Cockapoo hostage in order to get the team to win. At the same time, Ray is reluctant to call his former worker Schwoz when the Man Cave is on the fritz. Special guest star: Russell Westbrook as Shawn Guest stars: Duncan Bravo as Gooch, Michael D. Cohen as Schwoz, David Hoffman as Coach Bix, Joe Kaprielian as Sidney, Matthew Zhang as Oliver
10	10	"Henry the Man-Beast"	Steve Hoefer	Dan Schneider & Dana Olsen	November 22, 2014	111	2.03
A device in the Man Cave that is meant to make men stronger, more powerful, and "manlier" strikes Henry when he accidentally leans on the machine. The effect makes him grow facial hair and increases his adrenaline, making him angry and eventually turning him "beastly". Captain Man, Schwoz, and Charlotte rush to find Henry before his crazy behavior ruins his date with Chloe Hartman. Guest stars: Michael D. Cohen as Schwoz, Joe Kaprielian as Sidney, Jade Pettyjohn as Chloe, Matthew Zhang as Oliver
11	11	"Invisible Brad"	Adam Weissman	Dan Schneider & Jake Farrow	January 10, 2015	112	1.82
Guest stars: Jill Benjamin as Miss Shapen, Jake Farrow as Invisible Brad
12	12	"Spoiler Alert"	Adam Weissman	Dan Schneider & Christopher J. Nowak	January 24, 2015	113	1.63
Henry and Ray must deal with The Spoiler, an annoying new teenage super-villain that finds out the endings of TV shows and movies and tells people about it before they see it. Meanwhile, Piper tries to get into the Man Fans, a Captain Man fan club led by Paula Makiato, and goes through the initiation process with the latest one involving getting a selfie with Captain Man. Guest stars: Duncan Bravo as Gooch, Michael D. Cohen as Schwoz, Amiah Miller as Paula
13	13	"Let's Make a Steal"	Steve Hoefer	Dan Schneider & Dave Malkoff	January 31, 2015	114	1.62
Guest stars: Jeffrey Nicholas Brown as Mr. Hart, Duncan Bravo as Gooch, R. Brandon Johnson as Rick, Asante Jones as Dr. Baxter, Gus Kamp as Derek, Lolli Sorenson as Maddy
14	14	"Super Volcano"	Russ Reinsel	Dan Schneider & Dana Olsen	February 7, 2015	115	1.62
Guest stars: Jeffrey Nicholas Brown as Mr. Hart, Kelly Sullivan as Mrs. Hart, Andrew Caldwell as Mitch, Michael D. Cohen as Schwoz, Keisuke Hoashi as Dr. Hornsby, Maeve Tomalty as Bianca, Matthew Zhang as Oliver
15	15	"My Phony Valentine"	Steve Hoefer	Dan Schneider & Jake Farrow	February 14, 2015	116	1.84
When Henry asks his crush Bianca to be his valentine and go out with him to Club Soda, she rejects his offer since Mitch Bilsky already asked her out. In order to impress Bianca, Schwoz provides Henry an android which can be turned into any human form as a date. Meanwhile, Captain Man reluctantly has a date with Henry's teacher Miss Shapen so that she will change Henry's grade on a test that he failed. Guest stars: Michael D. Cohen as Schwoz, Jill Benjamin as Miss Shapen, Andrew Caldwell as Mitch, Alyssa Jenny Cotero as Tiffany, Maeve Tomalty as Bianca
16	16	"Caved In"	Nathan Kress	Teleplay by : Dan Schneider & Christopher J. Nowak; Story by : Tara Hernandez	February 28, 2015	117	2.17
Henry and Charlotte plan to take Ray to Six Poles Amusement Park to give Ray the childhood that he never had. When Jasper accidentally triggers the emergency lockdown mode for the Man Cave and Junk 'n' Stuff, Henry, Charlotte and Ray are trapped in the Man Cave, spoiling the plans. At the same time, Jasper and Piper are trapped upstairs alone with no food.
17	17	"Elevator Kiss"	Steve Hoefer	Dan Schneider & Dave Malkoff	March 7, 2015	118	1.65
Guest stars: Michael D. Cohen as Schwoz, Maeve Tomalty as Bianca, Matthew Zhang as Oliver
18	18	"Man of the House"	Russ Reinsel	Dan Schneider & Dana Olsen	March 14, 2015	119	1.76
Guest stars: Jeffrey Nicholas Brown as Mr. Hart, Kelly Sullivan as Mrs. Hart, Duncan Bravo as Gooch
19	19	"Dream Busters"	Adam Weissman	Teleplay by : Dan Schneider & Jake Farrow; Story by : Joe Sullivan	March 21, 2015	120	1.38
Guest stars: Michael D. Cohen as Schwoz, Jill Benjamin as Miss Shapen, Matthew Zhang as Oliver
20	20	"Kid Grounded"	Russ Reinsel	Dan Schneider & Christopher J. Nowak	April 4, 2015	121	1.58
After getting caught sneaking out by Piper late at night, his parents ground him alongside Piper, who watched a rated R movie. While Henry is indisposed, he gets upset when Charlotte fills in as Kid Danger, causing a rift between them. A deal is made by Henry's parents in which if he and Piper can go 24 hours without arguing, then their grounding will be lifted. However, they will be grounded for a month if they fail. Meanwhile, Jasper tries to make life hack videos. Guest stars: Jeffrey Nicholas Brown as Mr. Hart, Kelly Sullivan as Mrs. Hart, Michael D. Cohen as Schwoz
21	21	"Captain Jerk"	Mike Caron	Teleplay by : Dan Schneider & Dave Malkoff; Story by : Andrew Thomas	April 11, 2015	122	1.92
When a video of Captain Man smashing up two children's lemonade stand goes viral, people start bad-mouthing him; however, what people fail to realize is that he was actually trying to kill a deadly spider. In an effort to boost his image, Captain Man holds a competition, where the first three people to guess the right number win a tour of the Man Cave; however, when Jasper and Piper are among the winners, Henry worries that they will recognize him. Schwoz helps Henry by attaching a device to his neck that makes his voice sound deeper. Later, as a cover-up to explain his deep voice, Henry tells the winners that he went through puberty. Guest stars: Jeffrey Nicholas Brown as Mr. Hart, Kelly Sullivan as Mrs. Hart, Duncan Bravo as Gooch, Michael D. Cohen as Schwoz, Carrie E. Barrett as Mary Gaperman, Winston Story as Trent Overunder, Shayne Topp as Dennis
22	22	"The Bucket Trap"	Nathan Kress	Dan Schneider & Dana Olsen	April 18, 2015	123	1.42
Guest stars: Jeffrey Nicholas Brown as Mr. Hart, Mason Davis as Max
23	23	"Henry & the Bad Girl, Part 1"	Steve Hoefer	Dan Schneider & Jake Farrow	May 2, 2015	124	1.44
While Captain Man and Kid Danger pursue the Van Del, the leader of a graffiti group known as the Wall Dogs, Kid Danger falls for Wall Dogs member Veronika. Meanwhile, Jasper, Sidney, Oliver, and Oliver's cousin Kris work with Piper in order to get $10,000 rewarded to whoever finds the Wall Dogs so that Jasper can pay for foot-reduction surgery. Guest stars: Michael D. Cohen as Schwoz, Carrie E. Barrett as Mary Gaperman, Josh Fingerhut as Van Del, Joe Kaprielian as Sidney, Madison Iseman as Veronica, Elise Luthman as Two Canz, Winston Story as Trent Overunder, Matthew Zhang as Oliver
24	24	"Henry & the Bad Girl, Part 2"	Steve Hoefer	Dan Schneider & Dave Malkoff	May 9, 2015	125	1.87
Following the fight against Captain Man near the Swellview sign, Veronika brings Kid Danger to her fellow Wall Dogs members Beyonspray, Spray-Z, Two Canz, and T Paint so that Van Del will welcome Henry into the Wall Dogs. At the same time, Captain Man searches for Kid Danger, while Piper, Jasper, Sidney, Oliver, and Kris continue looking for the Wall Dogs. Guest stars: Jeffrey Nicholas Brown as Mr. Hart, Michael D. Cohen as Schwoz, Josh Fingerhut as Van Del, Joe Kaprielian as Sidney, Madison Iseman as Veronica, Elise Luthman as Two Canz, Matthew Zhang as Oliver
25	25	"Jasper's Real Girlfriend"	David Kendall	Dan Schneider & Christopher J. Nowak	May 16, 2015	126	1.55
Courtney Sham, Jasper's girlfriend from summer camp, arrives from Fibberton and becomes jealous of Charlotte when she thinks she is dating Jasper. Meanwhile, Henry and Ray make a bet revolving around the loser of a ping-pong game having to clean the tube in ducky pajamas after Mexican food splattered over it following a visit from Schwoz' sister. Guest star: Jeffrey Nicholas Brown as Mr. Hart, Michael D. Cohen as Schwoz, Jada Facer as Courtney, Joe Kaprielian as Sidney, Matthew Zhang as Oliver

=== Season 2 (2015–16) ===
No. overall	No. in season	Title	Directed by	Written by	Original release date	Prod. code	U.S. viewers (millions)
26	1	"The Beat Goes On"	Adam Weissman	Dan Schneider & Christopher J. Nowak	September 12, 2015	201	2.13
Special guest star: Benjamin Flores, Jr. as Li'l Biggie Guest stars: Jeffrey Nicholas Brown as Mr. Hart, Michael D. Cohen as Schwoz, Amber Bela Muse as Nurse Cohort, Mike Ostroski as Dr. Minyak
27	2	"One Henry, Three Girls: Part 1"	Adam Weissman	Dan Schneider & Jay Kogen	September 19, 2015	202	1.78
28	3	"One Henry, Three Girls: Part 2"	Steve Hoefer	Dan Schneider & Dave Malkoff	September 26, 2015	203	1.78
29	4	"Henry & the Woodpeckers"	Mike Caron	Dan Schneider & Avin Das	October 3, 2015	204	1.57
Guest stars: Jeffrey Nicholas Brown as Mr. Hart, Michael D. Cohen as Schwoz, Wendy Braun as Ms. Sherwood, Layla Crawford as Sophie, Rodney J. Hobbs as Mr. Berman, Mandy June Turpin as Ms. Weiner
30	5	"Captain Man Goes on Vacation" "Captain Man: On Vacation"	Nathan Kress	Dan Schneider & Christopher J. Nowak	October 10, 2015	205	1.61
Guest stars: Jeffrey Nicholas Brown as Mr. Hart, Michael D. Cohen as Schwoz, Joe Kaprielian as Sidney, Matthew Zhang as Oliver, Ryan Grassmeyer as Jeff
31	6	"The Time Jerker"	Steve Hoefer	Dan Schneider & Jay Kogen	November 7, 2015	206	1.85
Guest stars: Kelly Sullivan as Mrs. Hart, Jeffrey Nichols Brown as Mr. Hart, Michael D. Cohen as Schwoz, Andrew Caldwell as Mitch Bilsky, Joe Kaprielian as Sidney, Joey Richter as The Time Jerker
32	7	"Secret Beef"	Adam Weissman	Dan Schneider & Dave Malkoff	November 14, 2015	207	1.35
Two weeks after Captain Man and Kid Danger captured the Time Jerker, Henry receives a gift basket. Henry finds a gift card to Swellview's most exclusive steakhouse, Montego's, inside. When his friends, family, neighbors, and Herb from Sam & Cat, who came to Swellview from Venice, Los Angeles as part of his vacation, want Henry to invite them as his guest, Henry decides to bring Ray, who has not yet been invited to Montego's as Captain Man. Henry soon finds himself conflicted when he also invites Bianca as part of their one year "Lockerversary". Ray and Schwoz try to pose as Henry and Bianca, but Henry and Bianca appear and catch them in the act. A dispute then ensures on who is who, but it eventually ends with Bianca leaving since she is not into beef, but chicken instead. After having their steak, Henry and Ray notice petty criminals Ert and Bernie leaving the restaurant and end up fighting them, causing damage to the dining area. Following Ert and Bernie's arrest, Captain Man and Kid Danger are told by the manager that they are not on the reservation list and have the food confiscated. Upon returning to the Man Cave, Captain Man finds out that some of the steak fell into Kid Danger's outfit and the two of them split it. Guest stars: Jeffrey Nichols Brown as Mr. Hart, Kelly Sullivan as Mrs. Hart, Michael D. Cohen as Schwoz, Carrie Barrett as Mary Gaperman, Jill Benjamin as Miss Shapen, Rob Locke as Turk, Joey Richter as The Time Jerker, Winston Story as Trent Overunder, Maeve Tomalty as Bianca Absent: Ella Anderson as Piper Hart
33	8	"Henry's Jelly"	Adam Weissman	Dan Schneider & Avin Das	November 21, 2015	208	1.52
When Jasper stops a thief and becomes a big news hit, Henry becomes jealous because nobody gives him any credit as Henry. In an attempt to prove himself, he tries to stop an angry customer who has taken hostages at an animal store as himself; however, Captain Man shows up, causing Henry to become distracted and taken hostage. When the angry customer threatens to drop a poisonous spider on Henry's face, Captain Man is forced to lock himself in a cage. Meanwhile, Jasper shows up at Henry's house looking for Henry, where Mr. and Mrs. Hart are getting massages. When he discovers Henry is in danger, he runs off to rescue him. Jasper then shows up at the animal store and lets Captain Man out of his cage. The angry customer becomes aware and comes back out demanding answers, but Captain Man punches him and puts a stop to him. When Henry and the rest of the hostages are freed, Jasper mentions how Henry does not need to thank him because they are best friends, causing Henry to feel bad for being jealous. To make up for it, Henry purchases the same poisonous spider that the angry customer threatened to drop onto Henry as an apology because Jasper saw it at the store and really wanted, but he could not afford it as it cost $150. Guest stars: Jeffrey Nichols Brown as Mr. Hart, Kelly Sullivan as Mrs. Hart, Carrie Barrett as Mary Gaperman, Jill Benjamin as Miss Shapen, Zach Callison as Chet, Joe Kaprielian as Sidney, Matthew Zhang as Oliver, Winston Story as Trent Overunder, Toby Wilson as Dirk Absent: Ella Anderson as Piper Hart
34	9	"Christmas Danger"	Steve Hoefer	Dan Schneider & Christopher J. Nowak	November 28, 2015	209	1.62
After Captain Man gets arrested and put in jail for not wearing a hair net, while serving food to the people at his third annual Christmas breakfast, Jasper points out other ridiculous laws on the books in Swellview, such as the prohibitions of taking a picture of a rabbit without a permit, wearing two or more hats at the same time, and chewing ice cream on a cone. Jasper and Henry go on to openly break these laws at city hall and end up in jail as well, along with Charlotte, who fails to report the lawbreaking. Later, when a police officer comes to the Hart residence to report Henry is in jail, upon hearing Piper's idea, Kris throws the officer's walkie-talkie into the fireplace, while Jake pulls down the officer's pants, both of which land the two in jail. Following her parents' arrest, Piper decides to throw a Christmas party at the house with her friends. Guest stars: Jeffrey Nichols Brown as Mr. Hart, Kelly Sullivan as Mrs. Hart
35	10	"Indestructible Henry, Part 1"	Nathan Kress	Dan Schneider & Jay Kogen	March 19, 2016	210	2.02
After Kid Danger is nearly injured trying to help Captain Man stop a clock store from exploding, he decides to go through Dr. Carl Manchester's trans-molecular densitizer that made Ray indestructible, located in the Man Cave's storage room. Meanwhile, Piper wants to be on the TV show "Junior Chefs" much to the dismay of Mr. Hart after the last two times Piper had cooked for the family. Ray is hesitant to use the trans-molecular densitizer on Henry after some incidents that Dr. Manchester and his fellow scientists did on Dave McCallen who gained a face on his stomach, John Walker whose hands became feet, and Glenn Levit who gained arms that emerge from his ears. Schwoz theorizes that it worked well with Ray when he was a young boy and uses it on Henry. The experiment appears to work, but the next morning, Henry discovers that the densitizer gave him a side effect. Guest stars: Jeffrey Nichols Brown as Mr. Hart, Kelly Sullivan as Mrs. Hart, Michael D. Cohen as Schwoz
36	11	"Indestructible Henry, Part 2"	Russ Reinsel	Dan Schneider & Dave Malkoff	March 26, 2016	211	2.12
As a side effect of going through the trans-molecular densitizer, Henry breathes fire whenever he laughs. Upon examining Henry, Schwoz tells Ray and Charlotte that the machine mutated his throat muscles. Meanwhile, Piper has another attempt at making her parents dinner after the dogs that Jasper walked ate it. Jasper brings his comedian cousin Dex Dunlop to dinner as Henry tries not to laugh at his jokes. Piper eventually catches on to the family's plan to avoid saying that her cooking is awful. Thanks to Piper declaring that dinner is over, Henry returns to the Man Cave, where Ray is used to conduct the two components of the trans-molecular densitizer in order to reverse the mutation to Henry's throat muscles. Guest stars: Kelly Sullivan as Mrs. Hart, Jeffrey Nichols Brown as Mr. Hart, Michael D. Cohen as Schwoz, Joshua Carlon as Dex
37	12	"Text, Lies & Video"	Steve Hoefer	Dan Schneider & Avin Das	April 9, 2016	212	1.65
Henry and Ray want a video made to see what they would look like when they blow their bubbles and transform into their superhero personas. However, Henry accidentally sends the video to Piper. Henry must now get Piper's phone and delete the video before Piper can see it. When Jasper brings the phone to Henry with Piper on his tail, it turns out that Jasper accidentally grabbed Mrs. Hart's phone by mistake, and Henry then races home to get to Piper's phone before Piper does. After much difficulty, Henry deletes the video from the phone, but not knowing how to delete it from the cloud, he brings it to Junk 'n' Stuff. Henry stalls Piper as Charlotte deletes the video from the Cloud. Piper then reclaims her phone and storms off. At the end, Henry and Ray discover that Charlotte had videoed herself instead of them. Guest star: Jeffrey Nichols Brown as Mr. Hart
38	13	"Opposite Universe"	Adam Weissman	Dan Schneider & Christopher J. Nowak	April 16, 2016	213	1.75
Henry and Charlotte get caught in an electrical disturbance in the transport tubes during a thunderstorm and end up in an alternate dimension where Ray/Captain Man and Schwoz are evil and are planning to force the tickets for The Halkings' concert from that reality's version of Piper. To keep the alternate Piper from being eliminated, Henry and Charlotte must prevent the alternate Captain Man from succeeding. Meanwhile, Ray and Schowz deal with the alternate Henry and Charlotte that ended up in their universe. After Henry tells the alternate Captain Man the truth, a truce is held to get both versions of Henry and Charlotte back to their respective dimensions. Guest stars: Jeffrey Nichols Brown as Mr. Hart, Michael D. Cohen as Schwoz, Andrew Caldwell as Mitch Bilsky, Joe Kaprielian as Sidney, Matthew Zhang as Oliver
39	14	"Grave Danger"	David Kendall	Dan Schneider & Andrew Reese Thomas & Joe Sullivan	April 23, 2016	217	1.67
When strange things have been happening to Ray, Charlotte and Schwoz find out that Ray's old friend, Invisible Brad, survived being hit by a bus. While investigating his grave at the Swellview cemetery, Kid Danger and Captain Man exam Invisible Brad's casket. However, they end up being ambushed by Invisible Brad, who traps them in the casket and buries them alive. Meanwhile, Jasper gets a pair of petite walkie-talkies and tries using different code names for Henry. At the same time, Piper gets a driver's license from Swellview's DMV. Invisible Brad then proceeds to enter the Man Cave and uses Ray's power gum to become Captain Brad. With help from Piper, Jasper rescues Captain Man and Kid Danger from the casket. Back at the Man Cave, Invisible Brad reveals that he faked his death so that he could take over as Swellview's hero, but when Henry and Ray return, they find him, and Henry uses bear spray to defeat him. Guest star: Michael D. Cohen as Schwoz
40	15	"Ox Pox"	Steve Hoefer	Dan Schneider & Samantha Martin	April 30, 2016	218	1.83
Piper comes down with an illness called Ox Pox after unknowingly consuming one of the cookies that Schwoz made with comodium acetate due to him mistaking it for sugar. In order to get the feathers of the extinct Chica-Willow, Captain Man uses the Time Jerker's confiscated time machine to go back to Prudhoe Bay, Alaska, in 1709 in order to obtain the Chica-Willow feathers so that he can make a cure for Piper. Meanwhile, Jasper wants Henry to play ultimate hide and seek with him by giving him clues. When Captain Man obtains the Chica-Willow, Scwhoz accidentally brings an elderly Ray from 50 years in the future by mistake. Henry, Charlotte, and Schwoz then work together to bring Captain Man back to the present and send the elderly Ray back to his own time, before Henry makes the cure for Piper. Guest stars: Jeffrey Nichols Brown as Mr. Hart, Michael D. Cohen as Schwoz
41	16	"Twin Henrys"	Russ Reinsel	Dan Schneider & Avin Das	May 7, 2016	216	1.37
Guest stars: Jeffrey Nichols Brown as Mr. Hart, Michael D. Cohen as Schwoz, Steve Lewis as Mark
42	17	"Danger & Thunder"	Steve Hoefer	Dan Schneider & Jay Kogen & Dave Malkoff	June 18, 2016	214–215	2.24
A crime wave has hit Swellview and Dr. Minyak has escaped from prison. In Hiddenville, Phoebe Thunderman sees the news and plans to help Captain Man and Kid Danger. After an unsuccessful robbery by the Three Muchachos, they learn from the Three Muchachos that Dr. Minyak has called a meeting with Swellview's villains to discuss how to destroy Captain Man and Kid Danger. Meanwhile, Piper's neck gets stiff, causing Jasper and Mr. Hart to work to unstiffen her neck. As Captain Man and Kid Danger work to pose as two of the Three Muchachos, Phoebe mistakes them for the real Three Muchachos and goes on the attack until Captain Man and Kid Danger clear things up. Meanwhile, Piper's doctor diagnoses her condition as "Text Neck" and she must wear a cone until her neck recuperates. Phoebe joins Captain Man and Kid Danger and goes undercover, where Dr. Minyak, Nurse Cohort, Drill Finger, Jeff, Van Del, and Time Jerker are assembled at the bottom of an underwater base beneath Lake Swellview by Toddler, who has Phoebe's brother Max Thunderman working for them. Toddler explains to the assembled villains that he survived the bottomless ball pit by being blasted 100 feet beneath the Earth and had to dig himself out. Toddler proposes to the assembled villains that if they combine their powers, they can destroy Captain Man and Kid Danger. When Phoebe makes herself known to Max, she learns that Max came to steal Dr. Minyak's Heliometer. Meanwhile, Jasper helps Piper and ends up accidentally texting the wrong guy to sushi party, causing Piper's friends to get angry at her. As the villains work to come up with a plan to destroy Captain Man and Kid Danger, Max ends up giving Captain Man and Kid Danger away, causing Phoebe to come to their defense. Captain Man has Kid Danger get Phoebe away from the villains as he works to buy them some time until Toddler uses the Heliometer on Captain Man. With Captain Man trapped in a cement block on the train, Toddler and his henchmen state that the train will go over the Jandy Bridge and be thrown into the Jandy River as Max attempts to take the Heliometer. With help from Charlotte and Schwoz, Kid Danger and Phoebe locate Captain Man. Meanwhile, Piper's friends show up at her house to express their anger toward Piper as her admits to the mistake, and the group takes their anger out on Jasper. Kid Danger and Phoebe catch up and face off against Toddler, Dr. Minyak, Van Del, and their henchmen as Charlotte unleashes the man-grenades to free Captain Man. With Captain Man free, the heroes fight the villains who are thrown off the train. Max is forgiven by Captain Man and Kid Danger, but is given a ride home dangling from Schwoz's helicopter. Also starring: Jack Griffo, Kira Kosarin Guest stars: Jeffrey Nichols Brown as Mr. Hart, Michael D. Cohen as Schwoz, Josh Fingerhut as Van Del, Ben Giroux as The Toddler, Ryan Grassmeyer as Jeff, Joey Richter as The Time Jerker, Amber Bela Muse as Nurse Cohort, Mike Ostroski as Dr. Minyak Note: This episode features crossover appearances from Phoebe and Max Thunderman of The Thundermans.
43	18	"I Know Your Secret"	Russ Reinsel	Dan Schneider & Christopher J. Nowak	July 17, 2016	219	2.60
Henry receives a note in his locker from an unknown person that they are aware of what he did on Wednesday and know his secret, and Henry immediately assumes that the person who sent the note knows he is Kid Danger. He takes the note back to the Man Cave, where Schwoz tries to identify any DNA that could find the creator of the note; however, nothing is found. Meanwhile, Piper tries to send back a spray tan gun when she believes she was sent the wrong item and later decides to operate a tanning salon from home. When Henry and Charlotte arrive home, Henry heads to his room, where he finds Jasper waiting for him. Shocked, Henry tries to explain, but is unable to speak, assuming that Jasper knows he is Kid Danger. Downstairs, Piper tells Charlotte that Jasper told her his secret. Charlotte asks what he told her and Piper says that Henry had promised to see Galaxy Wars 10 on Saturday with Jasper, but his mom wanted to see it on opening night, which was Wednesday, so Henry had gone with her. Meanwhile, Henry's father is arrested on the misunderstanding that he was running an illegal tanning operation. Frazzled by the misunderstanding, Charlotte rushes to Henry's room to tell him that Jasper does not know his secret identity; however, it is too late as Henry has revealed to Jasper that he is Kid Danger. Jasper faints in excitement, and Henry contacts Captain Man and asks him to come to his house. When Captain Man gets there, they get into an argument about Henry's oath to never tell anyone he is Kid Danger. Afterward, Captain Man decides they have to erase Jasper's memory—including memories of his best friend—to prevent any more exposure. Henry contemplates and asks if he can spend a few minutes with Jasper before his memory is wiped. He and Jasper relapse on their past, with Jasper saying he is proud of Henry. Emotional by this and not willing to lose his best friend, Henry eventually resists wiping Jasper's memory and begs Captain Man not to. He relents, but finally agrees and takes Jasper under his wing. Guest stars: Kelly Sullivan as Mrs. Hart, Jeffrey Nichols Brown as Mr. Hart, Michael D. Cohen as Schwoz, Jill Benjamin as Miss Shapen, Joe Kaprielian as Sidney, Matthew Zhang as Oliver

=== Season 3 (2016–17) ===
No. overall	No. in season	Title	Directed by	Written by	Original release date	Prod. code	U.S. viewers (millions)
44	1	"A Fiñata Full of Death Bugs"	Steve Hoefer	Dan Schneider & Christopher J. Nowak	September 17, 2016	301	1.82
When Jasper accidentally gives away a piñata full of killer bees to Piper for her friend's birthday party, Henry and Ray must find a way to sneak in and remove it before harm can be done. They eventually dress up as clowns to infiltrate the house, but things do not exactly go as planned, and the fiñata eventually breaks when Henry finally manages to get it down from the tree. Guest stars: Michael D. Cohen as Schwoz, Carrie Barrett as Mary Gaperman, Saylor Bell as Marla, Winston Story as Trent Overunder
45	2	"Love Muffin"	Steve Hoefer	Dan Schneider & Hayes Jackson	September 24, 2016	302	1.90
A female criminal named Gwen uses special muffins to make Captain Man fall in love with her so that she can access the Man Cave. When Henry, Charlotte, and Schwoz catch onto the plan, they must work to keep Captain Man from marrying her. Guest stars: Michael D. Cohen as Schwoz, Courtney Henggeler as Gwen
46	3	"Scream Machine"	Nathan Kress	Dan Schneider & Dave Malkoff	October 1, 2016	303	1.60
Guest stars: Jeffrey Nicholas Brown as Mr. Hart, Michael D. Cohen as Schwoz, Tristen MacDonald as Ms. Tanner, Kayla Madison as Jana
47	4	"Mouth Candy"	Adam Weissman	Dan Schneider & Christopher J. Nowak	October 8, 2016	305	1.78
Guest stars: Jill Benjamin as Miss Shapen, Andrew Caldwell as Mitch Bilsky, Henry Dittman as Mr. Sugarman, Matthew Zhang as Oliver Absent: Ella Anderson as Piper Hart
48	5	"The Trouble with Frittles"	Adam Weissman	Dan Schneider & Samantha Martin	November 5, 2016	304	1.60
Guest stars: Michael D. Cohen as Schwoz, Carrie Barrett as Mary Gaperman, Saylor Bell as Marla, Jill Benjamin as Miss Shapen, Joe Kaprielian as Sidney, Alec Mapa as Jack, Winston Story as Trent Overunder, Matthew Zhang as Oliver
49	6	"Hour of Power"	Steve Hoefer and Russ Reinsel	Dan Schneider & Dave Malkoff and Andrew Thomas	November 11, 2016	307–308	3.16
Drex, a former sidekick of Captain Man-turned-supervillain, has escaped from prison when the daughter of the parole board's chairman tampers with the prison computers during "Take Your Daughter to Work Day" which allowed Drex to get paroled. As part of his revenge, Drex traps Captain Man in an unbreakable box. After failing to free Captain Man, and subsequently being embarrassed by Drex, Henry turns to Schwoz for help, where he gains super-fast reflexes as a new superpower. Guest stars: Michael D. Cohen as Schwoz, Carrie Barrett as Mary Gaperman, Danielle Morrow as Kooschtello, Jeremy Rowley as Schwahbbit, Winston Story as Trent Overunder, Tommy Walker as Drex Absent: Ella Anderson as Piper Hart
50	7	"Dodging Danger"	Adam Weissman	Dan Schneider & Hayes Jackson	December 3, 2016	311	2.50
Guest stars: Michael D. Cohen as Schwoz, Andrew Caldwell as Mitch Bilsky, Matthew Zhang as Oliver
51	8	"Double Date Danger"	Steve Hoefer	Dan Schneider & Hayes Jackson	February 11, 2017	314	2.06
Miss Shapen persuades Henry to let her niece Noelle stay at his house since she is allergic to the cats at her house. When wanting to date someone, Noelle chooses Jasper over Henry, where they end up on a double date with Piper and Kale. Henry does not know it yet, but Noelle is secretly working for Drill Finger in his plot to target people's teeth. Guest stars: Kelly Sullivan as Mrs. Hart. Jeffrey Nicholas Brown as Mr. Hart, Jill Benjamin as Miss Shapen, Annalisa Cochrane as Noelle
52	9	"Space Invaders, Part 1"	Mike Caron	Dan Schneider & Joe Sullivan	March 11, 2017	312	2.56
When two astronauts are held hostage aboard a space station, Kid Danger and Captain Man must travel to space in order to rescue them. Upon reaching the space station, they shockingly discover who the person holding the astronauts captive is. Meanwhile, Piper is eager to see her own commercial premiere on television. Guest stars: Jeffrey Nicholas Brown as Mr. Hart, Michael D. Cohen as Schwoz, Michael C. Alexander as Neil, Carrie Barrett as Mary Gaperman, Emma Shannon as Kelsey, Winston Story as Trent Overunder, Jeff Witzke as Jim
53	10	"Space Invaders, Part 2"	Mike Caron	Dan Schneider & Christopher J. Nowak	March 18, 2017	313	1.65
On the space station, Captain Man and Kid Danger discover the reason why the two astronauts were taken hostage by the little girl, who is revealed to be Jim's daughter Kelsey. She reveals that the astronauts are taking bunnies to the Moon for experiments. In the process of transporting the bunnies back, however, problems soon arise. Eventually, they all travel back to Earth on the Love Shuttle, with Captain Man having to cling onto the side of the shuttle, much to his dismay. Meanwhile, Piper is getting impatient from the multiple interruptions to her commercial, much to the dismay of her friends and father. Guest stars: Jeffrey Nicholas Brown as Mr. Hart, Michael D. Cohen as Schwoz, Michael C. Alexander as Neil, Carrie Barrett as Mary Gaperman, Emma Shannon as Kelsey, Winston Story as Trent Overunder, Jeff Witzke as Jim
54	11	"Gas or Fail"	David Kendall	Dan Schneider & Hayes Jackson	March 25, 2017	306	1.79
When a gas pipe bursts below Swellview's nuclear plant, Henry and Ray must go fix it before the gas reaches the surface. However, Henry is stuck in school because of Achievement Test Day and is not allowed to leave. Eventually, Captain Man and Schwoz are able to devise a plan to sneak Henry out of school and into the shaft, where they both successfully seal the pipe and eliminate the threat to Swellview. Guest stars: Michael D. Cohen as Schwoz, Carrie Barrett as Mary Gaperman, Jill Benjamin as Miss Shapen, Winston Story as Trent Overunder, Matthew Zhang as Oliver Absent: Ella Anderson as Piper Hart
55	12	"JAM Session"	Adam Weissman	Dan Schneider & Christopher J. Nowak	April 8, 2017	309	1.65
When Henry mentions that Piper was at a JAM session to control her anger issue, Ray says it will not help her, he makes a bet that if he goes over to dinner at Henry's house that one night, He would be able to get Piper to lose her temper, Charlotte is on Henry's team, while Jasper is on Ray's team, the agreement is that whichever team loses must eat a whole bucket of pumpkin guts. At dinner, Ray shows up at Henry's house and joins him for dinner, later, the doorbell rings, and a man is at the door with a pony, Piper loved ponies and the man says that Piper can have the pony, But the man asks for her age and she says she is eleven, the man says that she has to be thirteen to have the pony and takes the pony away from her. Piper begins to get mad, but Henry squeezes her bulb, and she starts to calm. Meanwhile, Schwoz sees a note that Ray had left for him, he wanted Schwoz to go to the grocery store and get more pumpkins, However, a tornado had hit Swellview, Schwoz leaves to go to the grocery store, but he is quickly blown into the air, Later, Ray goes on the porch and transforms into Captain Man, and then comes back into the house and tells Piper that she cannot be president of the Man Fans because she is 4'10". Later Schwoz is blown into the house and falls on Piper, and he then starts to eat their dinner. Piper is upset over what happened and loses her temper, Henry and Charlotte lose the bet and end up having to eat the pumpkin guts. Guest stars: Kelly Sullivan as Mrs. Hart, Jeffrey Nicholas Brown as Mr. Hart, Michael D. Cohen as Schwoz, Carrie Barrett as Mary Gaperman, Winston Story as Trent Overunder
56	13	"License to Fly"	David Kendall	Dan Schneider & Dave Malkoff	April 15, 2017	315	1.72
57	14	"Green Fingers"	Steve Hoefer	Dan Schneider & Dave Malkoff	April 22, 2017	310	1.83
Guest stars: Kelly Sullivan as Mrs. Hart, Jeffrey Nicholas Brown as Mr. Hart, Michael D. Cohen as Schwoz
58	15	"Stuck in Two Holes"	Harry Matheu	Dan Schneider & Hayes Jackson	April 29, 2017	317	1.72
Guest stars: Jeffrey Nicholas Brown as Mr. Hart, Michael D. Cohen as Schwoz, Ryan Grassmeyer as Jeff
59	16	"Live & Dangerous: Part 1"	Adam Weissman	Dan Schneider & Christopher J. Nowak	September 16, 2017	319	1.57
After Kid Danger and Captain Man are invited to a party that will be hosted by a huge webstar named Frankini who has Goomer from Sam & Cat as his assistant, it is revealed that Frankini is using Kid Danger and Captain Man to break the world record for the most people watching a live stream. Meanwhile, Charlotte babysits Piper and both end up watching pimple popping videos. Guest stars: Frankie Grande as Frankini, Jeffrey Nicholas Brown as Mr. Hart, Michael D. Cohen as Schwoz, Zoran Korach as Goomer
60	17	"Live & Dangerous: Part 2"	Russ Reinsel	Dan Schneider & Hayes Jackson	September 23, 2017	320	2.22
Charlotte, Jasper, Piper, and Schwoz must stop Kid Danger and Captain Man before they reveal their true identities to the world. With the help of Sydney and Oliver, Piper tries to take away viewers from Frankini's live stream so that people can watch Piper popping Jasper's big pimple. Meanwhile, Charlotte and Schwoz are back at the Man Cave and Schwoz comes up with the idea of turning off the power in all of Swellview. As Kid Danger and Captain Man are about to take off their masks, the power goes out and they return to their old selves enough to thwart Frankini. Later, Piper pops Jasper's pimple which gets all over Frankini. Guest stars: Frankie Grande as Frankini, Michael D. Cohen as Schwoz, Zoran Korach as Goomer, Joe Kaprielian as Sidney, Matthew Zhang as Oliver
61	18	"Balloons of Doom"	Steve Hoefer	Dan Schneider & Dave Malkoff	September 30, 2017	318	1.61
Piper is about to start a man fan meeting when Dr. Minyak and Nurse Cohort take her and the man fans hostage; Henry and Ray must now find a way to rescue them. Schwoz comes up with the idea of using a background board so it looks like Henry and Ray are in the Man Cave so they can sneak out without Dr. Minyak being aware of their plan. If they are detected, Dr. Minyak will launch Piper into space. Later, Henry and Ray are able to rescue Piper and the man fans and send Dr. Minyak into space instead. Guest stars: Jeffrey Nicholas Brown as Mr. Hart, Michael D. Cohen as Schwoz, Izabella Alvarez as Sharon, Amber Bela Muse as Nurse Cohort, Mike Ostroski as Dr. Minyak, Samuel Sadovnik as Benny
62	19	"Swellview's Got Talent"	Steve Hoefer	Dan Schneider & Christopher J. Nowak	October 7, 2017	316	1.65
Kid Danger and Captain Man are judges on the show "Swellview's Got Talent", which Piper and her friend, Carl (William Simmons), are performing in. After the first performance goes awry due to Harry Hoagie (Jay Tapaoan) acting strangely and then passing out, it is Piper and Carl's turn to perform their dance. Unfortunately, they too start to act strangely before passing out. Later in the backstage area, Jasper notices that champion Steven Sharp is making a big deal about having performers pet his ferret for good luck. Jasper searches on his phone and discovers that it is a Norwegian ferret and that it is dangerous and contact should be avoided because it secretes powerful oils that are capable of causing strange reactions, tongue-chewing, and loss of consciousness. Steven Sharp was having performers do this so he could win. Guest stars: Jeffrey Nicholas Brown as Mr. Hart, Michael D. Cohen as Schwoz, Charlie Burg as Steven Sharp, Kevin Railsback as Danny Chest

=== Season 4 (2017–18) ===
No. overall	No. in season	Title	Directed by	Written by	Original release date	Prod. code	U.S. viewers (millions)
63	1	"Sick & Wired"	Adam Weissman	Dan Schneider & Hayes Jackson	October 21, 2017	404	1.41
Guest stars: Jeffrey Nicholas Brown as Jake, Michael D. Cohen as Schwoz
64	2	"Brawl in the Hall"	Steve Hoefer	Dan Schneider & Dave Malkoff	November 4, 2017	405	1.68
Guest stars: Michael D. Cohen as Schwoz, Marisa Baram as Bysh, Carrie Barrett as Mary, Jill Benjamin as Miss Shapen, Winston Story as Trent
65	3	"The Rock Box Dump"	Russ Reinsel	Dan Schneider & Samantha Martin	November 11, 2017	406	1.52
When news reporters and social media start to report about how Kid Danger's hyper-motility superpower is a severe illness, and people on social media begin to believe that he is in grave danger, Henry decides to make a livestream as Kid Danger, so he can tell the public that he is not ill, but he slips on a grape and falls, thus hurting his ankle, then his tongue gets stung by a bee, the livestream begins, and Kid Danger appears, but he is limping and can hardly speak because of the bee sting, This makes everyone believe more that he is sick, and later it is announced that Piper would be dumping 1,524 rocks on her head, Kid Danger and Captain Man go to stop her, She and her friends load rocks in a forklift, preparing, they later show up, Kid Danger demonstrates his power by ripping a man's wig off his head, and tells them that it was not a disease, and to never drop rocks on their head. Guest stars: Carrie Barrett as Mary, Jill Benjamin as Miss Shapen, David Pressman as Dr. Skurvy, Winston Story as Trent, Matthew Zhang as Oliver
66	4	"Danger Games"	Steve Hoefer	Dan Schneider & Christopher J. Nowak & Jake Farrow	November 25, 2017	401–403	1.91 (Note: Due to the duration of this episode, it leaked into Nick at Nite, which split the ratings since Nielsen considers it a separate network despite being on the same channel. The Nickelodeon portion was 60 minutes, while the Nick at Nite portion was 30 minutes. The viewership data is a combined average of the ratings from both "networks", with 1.92 million total viewers for the Nickelodeon portion and 1.90 million total viewers for the Nick at Nite portion.)
After being defeated by Captain Man and Kid Danger, Dr. Minyak makes plans to take over the concert that Double G is performing at. At the same time, the Game Shakers meet Captain Man and Kid Danger, where Hudson unknowingly finds out their secret identity. Starring: Cree Cicchino, Madisyn Shipman, Benjamin "Lil' P-Nut" Flores, Jr., Thomas Kuc, Kel Mitchell Special guest star: Snoop Dogg Guest stars: Jeffrey Nicholas Brown as Jake, Kelly Sullivan as Kris, Michael D. Cohen as Schwoz, Shel Bailey as Ruthless, Bubba Ganter as Bunny, Mike Ostroski as Dr. Minyak, Amber Bela Muse as Nurse Cohort, Carrie Barrett as Mary, Kayla Madison as Jana, Victoria Oscar as Bubs Dixon, Winston Story as Trent
67	5	"Toon in for Danger"	Steve Hoefer	Dan Schneider & Samantha Martin	January 15, 2018	411	1.41
Displeased by the Captain Man cartoon that was made, Captain Man and Kid Danger are challenged by the network executives to make one that is better. As Captain Man and Kid Danger work on the cartoon, Piper prepares a viewing event at her house to see the new cartoon. Special guest star: Shaun White Guest stars: Jeffrey Nicholas Brown as Jake, Michael D. Cohen as Schwoz, Carrie Barrett as Mary, Jonathan Chase as Brian Bender, Matthew Downs as Nate, Matthew Zhang as Oliver Note: A sneak peek of the first two segments of the animated series The Adventures of Kid Danger aired immediately after this episode.
68	6	"Meet Cute Crush"	Russ Reinsel	Dan Schneider & Joe Sullivan	February 10, 2018	418	1.47
Guest star: Luca Alexander as Jackson Kregger
69	7	"Back to the Danger, Part 1"	David Kendall	Dan Schneider & Andrew Thomas	March 24, 2018	407	1.72
Due to a brief power outage suggested by Vice Mayor Willard to correct the clock tower, Drex is freed from his imprisonment in the Man Cave and uses Time Jerker's confiscated time machine to go back in time and prevent a younger Ray from becoming Captain Man. After Captain Man and Kid Danger had followed Drex to the past, Drex had placed an explosive to prevent the return trip to the present. Guest stars: Michael D. Cohen as Schwoz, Carrie Barrett as Mary, Winston Story as Trent, Tommy Walker as Drex
70	8	"Back to the Danger, Part 2"	David Kendall	Dan Schneider & Joe Sullivan	March 31, 2018	408	1.24
Teaming up with a younger Schwoz, Captain Man and Kid Danger work to prevent Drex from thwarting the origin of Captain Man. Meanwhile, Schwoz, Charlotte, and Jasper work on repairing the damaged time machine so that Captain Man and Kid Danger can return to the present. Guest stars: Michael D. Cohen as Schwoz, Kale Culley as Young Ray, Tommy Walker as Drex
71	9	"Budget Cuts"	Nathan Kress	Dan Schneider & Dave Malkoff	April 7, 2018	410	1.25
When Vice Mayor Willard does budget cuts on Swellview, that means that the budget to support Captain Man's campaign against crime is cut as well. So Captain Man and Kid Danger must work to raise the money to continue their campaign against crime. Guest stars: Jeffrey Nicholas Brown as Jake, Michael D. Cohen as Schwoz, Timothy Brennen as Vice Mayor Willard, Abbie Cobb as Cassie
72	10	"Diamonds Are for Heather"	Nathan Kress	Dan Schneider & Andrew Thomas	April 14, 2018	417	1.06
Guest stars: Michael D. Cohen as Schwoz, Lizze Broadway as Heather, Martin Garcia as Jerome
73	11	"Car Trek"	Nathan Kress	Dan Schneider & Andrew Thomas	April 28, 2018	412	1.09
Guest stars: Jeffrey Nicholas Brown as Jake, Michael D. Cohen as Schwoz
74	12	"Toddler Invasion"	Mike Caron	Dan Schneider & Samantha Martin	May 5, 2018	416	1.17
Toddler raids the Man Cave and traps Captain Man and Kid Danger in a trap where Toddler will harvest Captain Man's sweat so that he can become invincible like Captain Man. Jasper and Charlotte must work to rescue Captain Man and Kid Danger and defeat Toddler. Guest stars: Michael D. Cohen as Schwoz, Ben Giroux as The Toddler
75	13	"Captain Man-kini"	Steve Hoefer	Dan Schneider & Hayes Jackson	May 12, 2018	420	1.10
A new internet celebrity named GoBro is causing havoc with his super dangerous videos. Captain Man and Kid Danger release Frankini and Goomer from Swellview Prison so that they can help capture GoBro. The plan involves Captain Man temporarily swapping bodies with Frankini so that he can infiltrate GoBro's lair. Guest stars: Frankie Grande as Frankini, Michael D. Cohen as Schwoz, Zoran Korach as Goomer, Dawson Fletcher as Go-Bro
76	14	"Saturday Night Lies"	Adam Weissman	Dan Schneider & Hayes Jackson	May 19, 2018	414	1.05
Guest stars: Jeffrey Nicholas Brown as Jake, Kelly Sullivan as Kris, Michael D. Cohen as Schwoz, Katlyn Carlson as Lacey, Charlie Farrell as Roger
77	15	"Henry's Frittle Problem"	Allison Scagliotti	Dan Schneider & Dave Malkoff	September 22, 2018	415	1.02
Guest stars: Jeffrey Nicholas Brown as Jake, Kelly Sullivan as Kris, Alec Mapa as Jack Frittleman
78	16	"Spelling Bee Hard"	Russ Reinsel	Dan Schneider & Christopher J. Nowak	September 29, 2018	419	0.92
Guest stars: Michael D. Cohen as Schwoz, Carrie Barrett as Mary, Mike Ostroski as Dr. Minyak, Winston Story as Trent
79	17	"Up the Stairs!"	Adam Weissman	Dan Schneider & Ben Adams & Sam Becker	October 6, 2018	422	0.87
Guest stars: Michael D. Cohen as Schwoz, Jason Rogel as Morgan Maykew
80	18	"Danger Things"	David Kendall	Jake Farrow	October 8, 2018	502	1.14
Evil Science Corps led by Bill Evil accidentally opens an inter-dimensional portal to another dimension. When a creature from it abducts Piper, Captain Man and Kid Danger must rescue her. Guest stars: Jeffrey Nicholas Brown as Jake, Kelly Sullivan as Kris, Carrie Barrett as Mary, Matthew Patrick Davis as Kevin, Winston Story as Trent, Kevin Symons as Bill Evil, Matthew Zhang as Oliver Note: Starting with this episode, due to the departure of Dan Schneider, the Schneider's Bakery logo has been removed.
81	19	"Rubber Duck"	Mike Caron	Dan Schneider & Hayes Jackson	October 13, 2018	409	1.03
Guest stars: Kelly Sullivan as Kris, Jeffrey Nicholas Brown as Jake, Michael Dunn as Mr. Curtis, Luis Victor Jimenez as Zack, Joe Kaprielian as Sidney, Kayla Rosenthal as Layla, Matthew Zhang as Oliver
82	20	"Flabber Gassed"	Adam Weissman	Christopher J. Nowak	October 20, 2018	501	0.94
Guest stars: Jeffrey Nicholas Brown as Jake, James Preston Rogers as Barge

=== Season 5 (2018–20) ===
Starting with this season, Michael D. Cohen is credited as part of the main cast of the series. It is also the only season of the show to be produced without any involvement from Dan Schneider, after his dismissal from Nickelodeon the year prior, though he is still credited as a writer for "Thumb War".

No. overall	No. in season	Title	Directed by	Written by	Original release date	Prod. code	U.S. viewers (millions)
83	1	"Henry's Birthday"	Steve Hoefer	Dave Malkoff	November 3, 2018	503	1.11
Guest stars: Jeffrey Nicholas Brown as Jake, Kelly Sullivan as Kris, Ryan Grassmeyer as Jeff
84	2	"Whistlin' Susie"	Nathan Kress	Joe Sullivan	November 10, 2018	504	1.10
Guest star: Timothy Brennen as Vice Mayor Willard
85	3	"Thumb War"	Mike Caron and Adam Weissman	Dan Schneider & Joe Sullivan and Dan Schneider & Dave Malkoff	November 17, 2018	413/421	1.13
Special guest star: Jerry Trainor as Joey (Part 1) Guest stars: Kelly Sullivan as Kris, Jeffrey Nicholas Brown as Jake, Carrie Barrett as Mary, Eddie Davenport as Stainless Steve, Ryan Grassmeyer as Jeff, Matthew Kimbrough as Farmer Gunch, Jim Mahoney as Joey (Part 2), Arnie Pantoja as Mark, Winston Story as Trent
86	4	"The Great Cactus Con"	Allison Scagliotti	Samantha Martin	November 24, 2018	505	0.98
Henry, Charlotte, Jasper, and Ray win tickets to the 'Cactus Convention'. Jasper asks Patina to the Cactus Con to be his date, but she refuses because she is allergic to unfiltered air. Jasper unintentionally tells Patina that Kid Danger can protect her, because he, "owes him a favor". Charlotte asks for a bubble suit from Schwoz to protect Patina from her allergy. Jasper comes with Patina to the Cactus Con, but someone sends an anonymous note saying, "if someone brings the world's most poisonous Cactus, they will get a million dollars." With the initials "RT", this makes everyone wants to get the poisonous cactus, so Captain Man and Kid Danger try to fend the Swellview citizens from getting the Cactus, while Jasper tries to protect Patina from getting hit by Cactus. After zapping the civilians from getting the poisonous cactus, Kid Danger and Captain Man find out that the Cactus is gone and another note comes saying, "thanks for the cactus, game on". Meanwhile, Schwoz discovers that the Man Cave computers have been hacked saying only one thing, "game on". Guest star: Ariel Martin as Patina
87	5	"Part 1: A New Evil"	Mike Caron	Andrew Thomas	January 5, 2019	506	0.93
Guest stars: Jeffrey Nicholas Brown as Jake, Kelly Sullivan as Kris, David Blue as Rick Twitler, Carrie Barrett as Mary, Winston Story as Trent, Kayla Madison as Jana
88	6	"Part 2: A New Darkness"	Adam Weissman	Christopher J. Nowak	January 12, 2019	507	1.11
Guest stars: Jeffrey Nicholas Brown as Jake, Kelly Sullivan as Kris, David Blue as Rick Twitler
89	7	"Part 3: A New Hero"	Adam Weissman	Christopher J. Nowak	January 19, 2019	508	1.14
Guest stars: Jeffrey Nicholas Brown as Jake, Kelly Sullivan as Kris, David Blue as Rick Twitler, Carrie Barrett as Mary, Kurt Scholler as Booter, Winston Story as Trent
90	8	"Broken Armed and Dangerous"	Nathan Kress	Dave Malkoff	January 26, 2019	510	1.26
Guest stars: Jeffrey Nicholas Brown as Jake, Kelly Sullivan as Kris, Carrie Barrett as Mary, Jill Benjamin as Miss Shapen, Winston Story as Trent
91	9	"Knight & Danger"	Harry Matheu	Jake Farrow	February 2, 2019	509	1.32
Ryker appears in Swellview after Bill Evil had opened an inter-dimensional portal to Astoria following his last attempt to take over Astoria. When Captain Man and Kid Danger confront Ryker at Burger Castle as Ryker discovers that there is no magic in Swellview, they get tricked into helping Ryker in his plans to reclaim his throne of Astoria by giving him some of their high-tech weapons. Meanwhile, Schwoz gets the inter-dimensional transporter from Bill Evil and uses it to bring Arc and Ciara to the Man Cave. When Captain Man and Kid Danger learn the truth, they must work with Arc and Ciara to defeat Ryker and get them back to Astoria. Guest stars: Jeffrey Nicholas Brown as Jake, Owen Joyner as Arc, Daniella Perkins as Ciara, Geno Segers as Ryker, Kevin Symons as Bill Evil
92	10	"Grand Theft Otto"	David Kendall	Sam Becker & Nick Dossman	February 16, 2019	511	1.08
Henry and Charlotte are studying for a quiz when Piper brings home her class parrot, Otto, for the weekend. Jasper also returns from a family trip in Iowa with a mustache that everyone but Charlotte loves. When Piper steps out to grab Otto's birdseed, a conversation between Jasper and Henry causes Otto to begin repeating the phrase "Henry is Kid Danger". In an effort to protect Henry's secret identity, Henry hides Otto in his room while Jasper fakes a robbery scene and Charlotte stalls Piper. After Piper discovers the "robbery", she soon sets up a candlelight vigil in front of the house. Meanwhile, Henry explains the situation to Ray and Schwoz, and Ray suggests cloning Otto and replacing him with the lookalike. While Henry and Jasper interview the police about the robber, Charlotte plucks one of Otto's feathers and delivers it to the Man Cave. After several failed clonings, Schwoz is urged to speed things up, and he creates an unfinished clone that Ray uses to solve the issue once and for all as Captain Man. Guest stars: Carrie Barrett as Mary, Winston Story as Trent, Jonathan Chase as Brian Bender
93	11	"The Whole Bilsky Family"	Allison Scagliotti	Joe Sullivan	February 23, 2019	512	1.11
Guest stars: Jeffrey Nicholas Brown as Jake, Carrie Barrett as Mary, Andrew Caldwell as Mitch, Gill De St. Jeor as Billy, Ryan Grassmeyer as Jeff, Lita Lopez as Britney, Winston Story as Trent
94	12	"Secret Room"	Steve Hoefer	Samantha Martin	March 2, 2019	513	1.04
After returning from busting villain Arson Boy, Henry and Ray sneak away from a messy Man Cave caused by Schwoz's visiting family as Ray introduces to Henry his secret paradise, the "Mannex". However, Charlotte, Jasper and Schowz discover the room and get jealous after Ray and Henry kick them out, the former restricting the room as "crime-fighters only". Meanwhile, Piper, after getting arrested for reckless driving, bargains the two cops into cooking a soup for them to bail herself out of jail. After Henry delivers a karaoke machine to the Mannex, he and Ray discover the others in their own secret room in an effort to one-up them. After Schwoz destroys a life-size "fiesta-size" churro, Ray turns to his immature tendencies and threatens to blow up the Man Cave in vengeance. The four's bickering causes them to accidentally press the Man Cave's self-destruct button, causing them and Schwoz's family to evacuate as the Man Cave's explosion causes a town-wide earthquake (which occurs at the same time Piper gives the completed soup to the cops without spilling a single drop.) Mourning the loss of their hideout, Ray and Schwoz reveal they built nine additional Man Caves (five destroyed so far) to compensate for Ray's irresponsible demeanor. However, upon checking out the new Man Cave, a Mole Person appears and presses the self-destruct button, once again causing an earthquake. Guest stars: Jeffrey Nicholas Brown as Jake, Carrie Barrett as Mary, Jill Benjamin as Miss Shapen, Matthew Patrick Davis as Kevin, Winston Story as Trent, Kevin Symons as Bill Evil Note: Nickelodeon promoted this episode as the 100th episode as it is the 100th episode produced.
95	13	"My Dinner with Bigfoot"	Russ Reinsel	Andrew Thomas	March 9, 2019	514	1.08
Schwoz takes everyone to the woods to meet his friend Bigfoot; however, they quickly discover that a hunter named S. Thompson has been laying out traps to capture him, which Captain Man keeps falling for. Everything gets worse when Bigfoot scares Mitch and his friends and Mitch tells everyone that he has seen Bigfoot and S. Thompson hears about it on the news. Later, Kid Danger and the others device a plan to catch S. Thompson in a trap, but, unbeknownst to them, S. Thompson hears about the plan and traps them. S. Thompson calls the news and tells them to come to the woods, but Kid Danger and Captain Man came up with the idea to laser-shave Bigfoot's hair in order to protect him. When everyone arrives, including Piper and Mitch, and S. Thompson opens the trap, Bigfoot is nowhere to be found. Guest stars: Jeffrey Nicholas Brown as Jake, Carrie Barrett as Mary, Andrew Caldwell as Mitch, Jesse Mackey as Bigfoot, Scott Peat as S. Thompson, Winston Story as Trent
96	14	"Charlotte Gets Ghosted"	Mike Caron	Jake Farrow	March 16, 2019	515	1.06
Guest stars: Jeffrey Nicholas Brown as Jake, Kelly Sullivan as Kris
97	15	"I Dream of Danger"	Adam Weissman	Samantha Martin	March 23, 2019	516	1.31
Charlotte has a bizarre dream where she and Henry almost kiss after he saves her. Frazzled, Charlotte acts awkwardly around Henry, even deciding to avoid him after getting advice from Piper (who was concurrently busy threatening a classmate). After Captain Man and Kid Danger are dispatched to the zoo to assist in a tiger giving birth, Charlotte is forced to head there to deliver a bottle of tiger tranquilizer. In an effort to avoid Henry, she accidentally tumbles into a lion's enclosure--the exact scenario in her dream. After Charlotte explains her worries to Henry, she allows him to save her, and they both watch the zoo's night guard, Fran, make out with Captain Man in the lion's den.
98	16	"Holey Moley"	Russ Reinsel	Dave Malkoff	June 15, 2019	517	0.65
Guest stars: Jeffrey Nicholas Brown as Jake, Ella Anderson as Mole Queen
99	17	"Love Bytes"	Allison Scagliotti	Joe Sullivan	June 22, 2019	518	0.71
Henry, Charlotte and Jasper search for a special prize in Frittle chip packages to win a trip to an amusement park when Ray comes to the Man Cave with his new sword. At the same time, Schwoz emerges from his three-day trek in the Man Cave's computer to install an artificially intelligent operating system named Halley. Halley proves to be an incredible asset by instantly taking care of a crime in progress, but after the others leave to get more Frittles, she begins exhibiting an overprotective behavior. Later, Ray tries to kill a fly with his sword, but damages the computer, hurting Halley. Once Schwoz leaves to fix her, Halley locks the exits, deeming Ray a threat and attempting to kill him. When the others defend him, Halley deems them a threat as well and sends them away. The group makes a plan to strike against the obsessive AI and destroy her, and while Charlotte and Jasper head home, Henry and Ray return to Junk 'N Stuff just as Schwoz and Halley get married. Halley immediately traps them and tries to convince Schwoz to finish them. Ray unexpectedly finds the Frittle prize, but uses it to convince Schwoz their friendship matters, allowing him to destroy Halley with Ray's sword, although this melts it in the process, leaving Ray dismayed.
100	18	"Double-O Danger"	Steve Hoefer	Andrew Thomas	June 29, 2019	519	0.79
Guest stars: Timothy Brennen as Vice Mayor Willard, Jeffrey Vincent Parise as Rob Moss, Shelby Simmons as Joss Moss
101	19	"Massage Chair"	Mike Caron	Christopher J. Nowak & Sam Becker	July 13, 2019	520	0.93
Ray brings home an expensive massage chair following he and Henry busting a villain. The chair's impressive specs soon cause a bitter feud between Henry, Charlotte and Jasper. Meanwhile, Piper returns from a week-long scooter ride with an extremely muscular leg from refusing to swap legs. Ray, soon fed up with the kids' heated argument over the chair, decides to put them through an Olympics-style series of challenges. After a round, Ray announces a sudden death event--convince Piper to give them her phone, take a selfie with it and post it to Ray from her number. Henry arrives first, but fails to convince Piper to give her phone. After Charlotte and Jasper also fail to succeed, Henry tells his sister about the challenge, and she decides to win the chair for herself. When everyone else begs for a turn, Piper begins scheming her own series of challenges. Guest star: Jeffrey Nicholas Brown as Jake
102	20	"Henry Danger: The Musical"	Steve Hoefer	Samantha Martin	July 27, 2019	897	1.18
Using a special machine during the summer, Frankini places a musical curse over Swellview that makes everyone burst out in song. Guest stars: Jeffrey Nicholas Brown as Jake, Kelly Sullivan as Kris, Frankie Grande as Frankini, Carrie Barrett as Mary, Michael Dunn as Mr. Curtis, Zoran Korach as Goomer, Winston Story as Trent
103	21	"Sister Twister Part 1" "Glittered with Danger"	Adam Weissman	Joe Sullivan	September 21, 2019	524	1.09
Guest stars: Jeffrey Nicholas Brown as Jake, Timothy Brennen as Vice Mayor Willard, Adam Irigoyen as Brandon
104	22	"Sister Twister Part 2" "Inside Job"	Nathan Kress	Dave Malkoff	September 28, 2019	525	1.21
105	23	"A Tale of Two Pipers"	Allison Scagliotti	Andrew Thomas	October 5, 2019	523	0.78
Guest stars: Jeffrey Nicholas Brown as Jake, Debbie McLeod as Future Piper
106	24	"Story Tank"	David Kendall	Dave Malkoff	October 12, 2019	528	0.69
While watching a horror film, the others are annoyed that Henry is not only unaffected by the fear, he plans to eat a large box of Bro-maha steaks in front of them. Ray proposes a challenge--if Henry is scared, they get the steaks. Using a special VR device called the Story Tank, Ray and the others each tell scary stories, but subsequently fail each time. Just as they are about to concede, Schwoz tells a story of his own: while Ray was telling his story, he infused the Story Tank with butterfly DNA, turning Henry into a human caterpillar. This terrifies him, allowing the others to win the bet. Henry is left in despair while the others celebrate with Third-Eye Blind's "Semi-Charmed Life" playing in the background. Guest star: Jeffrey Nicholas Brown as Jake
107	25	"Captain Mom"	Russ Reinsel	Jake Farrow	November 2, 2019	526	0.77
Schwoz prevents Jasper from eating one of a jar full of spliced alien eggs created from a meteor that fell on Ray. As Schwoz and Charlotte go to look for a label maker for the jar, Henry and Ray return from a mission, mistaking the eggs for lychees, trying and repeatedly failing to throw them into each other's mouths; after the last one misses due to Schwoz's intervention, Ray picks it up and eats it anyway, causing him to get pregnant. The others become increasingly annoyed by Ray's pregnancy-induced mood swings and hangry episodes, leading to Henry lying his way out of the Man Cave. Upon arriving home, Henry gets an emergency from Charlotte about a grease theft. Ray subsequently goes into labor, forcing Henry to stop the robbery on his own, but as he confronts them as Kid Danger, Piper brings herself along (as her own superhero persona, Rollin' Thunder), and despite her accidental blunders, Henry sends the burglars away. Meanwhile, Schwoz removes the alien baby from inside Ray, though it latches onto Jasper's face. Guest star: Jeffrey Nicholas Brown as Jake
108	26	"Visible Brad"	Adam Weissman	Jake Farrow	November 9, 2019	527	0.89
Guest stars: Jake Farrow as Brad, Liz Stewart as Tatiana, Casey Washington as Stu
109	27	"EnvyGram Wall"	Steve Hoefer	Andrew Thomas	November 16, 2019	530	0.63
Guest star: Jonathan Chase as Brian Bender
110	28	"Holiday Punch"	Adam Weissman	Joe Sullivan	November 30, 2019	529	0.75
Guest stars: Carrie Barrett as Mary, Winston Story as Trent
111	29	"Mr. Nice Guy"	Mike Caron	Jake Farrow	January 11, 2020	531	0.95
A vigilante named Mr. Nice Guy is going around attacking people who break the rules like littering, not returning items, and talking loudly on the phone. Captain Man is annoyed that he has to be called to deal with criminal activities when he wants to see Battle Pigs 4. Captain Man and Kid Danger trace some of the wrongdoing thwarting to an educational TV show host named Mr. Wallabee. In the post-credits, S. Thompson is on Mt. Swellview looking for the Yeti when he finds what appears to be a Yeti when it is actually a frozen Drex. Guest stars: Andrew Caldwell as Mitch Bilsky, Brian Palermo as Mr. Wallabee, Scott Peat as S. Thompson, Vladimir Perez as Mail Snail, Tommy Walker as Drex
112	30	"Theranos Boot"	Evelyn Belasco	Andrew Thomas	January 18, 2020	532	1.02
Henry, Jasper, Charlotte, Piper, and Schwoz play around with the Theranos Boot from a movie. When they accidentally break it, they must use the dimensional transporter previously confiscated from Bill Evil to go to another dimension and take the other dimension's Theranos Boot before Ray finds out. In the post-credits, S. Thompson brings Miss Shapen to the spot on Mt. Swellview, where he found what he thought was a Yeti that got free from its frozen prison. They are then scared off by Drex in caveman attire.
113	31	"Rumblr"	Adam Weissman	Joe Sullivan	January 25, 2020	533	0.96
Captain Man has gotten bored of fighting the same villains even when the Toddler has escaped from prison. Henry helps to set him up with a profile on Rumblr as Henry sets one up for Kid Danger as well. At the fight club called The Beating Dungeon after they get their fight requests, Captain Man is faced off against a villain named Lawn Ranger who let himself go while Kid Danger fights a tough opponent named Kyle who also goes by the name Dead Bull. In the post-credits on Mt. Swellview, Bigfoot finds Drex unthawing a caveman when he objects to him operating on his mountain and using a hair dryer plugged near his home. Drex was able to scare him off with the cavemen that he had just defrosted. Afterwards, Drex continues unthawing a caveman. Guest stars: Jason Gibbs as Lawn Ranger, Ben Giroux as The Toddler
114	32	"Cave the Date"	Russ Reinsel	Samantha Martin	February 1, 2020	534	0.82
Charlotte has won a dinner with an international music superstar named Jack Swagger who she previously went to camp with 10 years ago. Unfortunately, Ray, Henry, and Jasper have accidentally set her kitchen on fire while getting her phone charger and using a flare since they could not find a light switch. To remedy this, Jasper suggests that they date somewhere that nobody knows about and suggests the Man Cave. Charlotte makes Ray temporarily turn the Man Cave into a restaurant to make up for what happened to her kitchen. Ray and Schwoz work as chefs, Jasper works as a host, Henry works as a waiter, and Piper plays the piano with help from her phone playing actual music. Due to Piper doing a secret selfie with Jack in the picture, a lot of people come to Junk 'n' Stuff to access the "secret restauruant for celebrities". Now Ray and Schowz must work to appease the people and not ruin Charlotte's date with Jack even when the hawk that has been terrorizing Jake shows up. In the post-credits, Drex has gotten back into civilized clothes and cut his beard and hair while in Nacho Bell's bathroom. He tells the two cavemen with him not to eat the toilet. Fran comes in telling them to hurry up and notes that they used the girls' bathroom. After they leave, Fran tells Drex that he "left his beard behind".
115	33	"Escape Room"	Evelyn Belasco	Christopher J. Nowak	February 8, 2020	536	0.89
Captain Man has been doing a lot of grand openings. The latest grand opening is an escape room. Piper is persuaded by Officer Walnut to babysit her niece and nephew Mika and Miles as a way to complete her community service. She ends up bringing them to the grand opening of the escape room. Captain Man discovers that the escape room is established by Jack Frittleman who placed a boomsday device as part of his revenge on Captain Man and Kid Danger for what happened to his factories. In the post-credits, Rick Twitler sends a video message and the blueprints for an omega weapon to The Beating Dungeon's bartender stating that it can take away Captain Man's powers. It has to be given to the right villain as the bartender tells a challenging Lawn Ranger to go away. Guest stars: Terrence Little Gardenhigh as Miles, Dana Heath as Mika, Alec Mapa as Jack Frittleman
116	34	"Game of Phones"	Mike Caron	Christopher J. Nowak	February 15, 2020	535	0.68
A Spanish girl named Lulu Elena Chapa de Silva chains herself outside of Junk 'n' Stuff until Captain Man comes to see her. She lost her phone to a boy who stole it from her last month and gains the support of her quest from the citizens of Swellview. After caving in, Captain Man agrees to help Chapa. After asking a thief named Brandon about any scumbags that took the phone, the three go on a stakeout to find the culprit in No Man's Land between Swellview and Neighborland. During the stakeout, they encounter Toddler, Dr. Minyak, Time Jerker, and Beekeeper who are meeting with The Beating Dungeon's bartender to get the bluepeints for the omega weapon. A battle occurs until the real culprit appears to sell Chapa's phone who gets scared away during the fight. The villains are defeated as Chapa continues to follow the culprit. Schwoz analyzes the blueprints that were acquired and learned what it is for. Guest stars: Carrie Barrett as Mary, Jonathan Chase as Brian Bender, Havan Flores as Chapa, Ben Giroux as The Toddler, Adam Irigoyen as Brandon, Mike Ostroski as Dr. Minyak, Joey Richter as Time Jerker, Winston Story as Trent
117	35	"Remember the Crimes"	Mike Caron	Jake Farrow	February 22, 2020	895	0.74
Piper learns about the stuff that she missed before she learned that Henry was Kid Danger. Everyone begins to remember the various moments up to now even during Charlotte's experiment in Henry's kitchen as her kitchen still has fire damage. Afterward, they view a dimension where actors play them and view the bloopers.
118	36	"The Beginning of the End"	Russ Reinsel	Christopher J. Nowak	February 29, 2020	537	0.85
Schwoz has put together the Omega Weapon just as Captain Man and Kid Danger return wearing togas following a fight with Time Jerker in the Roman Empire while confiscating his Time Ray. Charlotte and Piper admit to Henry that their graduation is this week while Henry is not graduating on the same week due to missing too much class and not having enough class due to helping Captain Man. Charlotte is planning to run a charity in Dystopia and will be attending Harvard, Jasper will be going to a college that sounds like Harvard, and Piper will be going to college in Florida. Henry states to Ray that he does not want to be in Swellview for the rest of his life. Vice-Mayor Willard calls Captain Man and Kid Danger to his office. They find that a boy named Bose who plays the message from Vice-Mayor Willard stating that he has married Bose's mom and to watch over him in during their vacation in exchange for a statue should Bose be unharmed. Taking refuge in a cave during a campout in the desert, Charlotte, Jasper, and Piper find Mitch crashing the camping event until he is fought off by Miss Shapen. Captain Man learns that Kid Danger has gained a meeting with the Mayor of Neighborville who wants Kid Danger to become Neighborville's superhero. The Mayor of Neighborville emerges and gives him different pitches to win him offer involving cheerleaders, the Danger Cave, a sidekick named Lil' Dynomite, and a statue. Kid Danger has a falling out with Captain Man where he does not want to become the next Captain Man. Kid Danger changes back to Henry upon quitting and leaves the Man-Cave. Henry comes home to find that his parents found his letters that he is not graduating. Jake cries over it and Kris wants some answers. Henry admits that he used to be Kid Danger just as a bunch of cavemen quite. Schwoz wipes everyone's memories as Captain Man plans on buying a fake school in case Henry comes crawling back to him. Schwoz finds a setting on the Memory Wiper to wipe Captain Man's memories of Henry as Drex ambushes Captain Man in the Man-Cave. Guest stars: Jeffrey Nicholas Brown as Jake, Kelly Sullivan as Kris, Jill Benjamin as Miss Shapen, Timothy Brennen as Vice Mayor Willard, Andrew Caldwell as Mitch Bilsky, Luca Luhan as Bose, Tommy Walker as Drex
119	37	"Captain Drex"	Adam Weissman	Dave Malkoff	March 7, 2020	538	0.89
Drex reveals to Captain Man, Bose, and Schwoz how he raised a caveman army by blaming their problems on Captain Man and Kid Danger and leading them into getting preserved on Mt. Swellview until global warming can free them. He plans to use Schwoz to modify the Memory Wiper so that all of Swellview can forget about Captain Man. Henry uses his spare gum tube to prove to his parents that he is Kid Danger while working to keep them safe from the invading cavemen. Charlotte, Piper, and Jasper are still in the same cave from that Miss Shapen and Mitch are in. Jake and Kris send Henry off to go help Ray while they hold off the cavemen. He arrives at the Man-Cave and gets into an argument with Captain Man until Drex and two of his cavemen subdue Kid Danger. Schwoz unknowingly proved Drex wrong as he starts to begin his plan to make all of Swellview forget about Kid Danger while also planning to use the Time Ray to send Ray 101,000,000 years into the past so that he can become the new Captain Man as he uses a bubble tube. Drex defeats Kid Danger and sends Captain Man to the past while destroying the Time Ray. Then he takes Bose and Schwoz to the helicopter to begin his memory-wiping plot. Charlotte, Jasper, and Piper arrive while having heard Henry ranting as they plan to thwart Drex's plans. Guest stars: Jeffrey Nicholas Brown as Jake, Kelly Sullivan as Kris, Jill Benjamin as Miss Shapen, Andrew Caldwell as Mitch Bilsky, Luca Luhan as Bose, Tommy Walker as Drex Note: This episode was dedicated to the memory of A.J. Dunn and Thomas Rasada
120	38	"The Fate of Danger: Part I"	Steve Hoefer	Christopher J. Nowak	March 14, 2020	539	0.88
Charlotte comes up with a plan to take away Drex's indestructibility using the omega weapon. Jasper and Piper head to the Hart residents to help Jake and Kris fight the cavemen. After being thrown around, Jasper keeps the cavemen busy while Piper evacuates her parents. Drex visits Planes-A-Plenty, where he can only get a blimp. With help from Mika and Miles, Henry searches around Captain Man's punching stump on Mt. Swellview, where they find Captain Man inside it thanks to a viral video that Henry did. The cavemen follow Jasper, Piper, Jake, and Kris to Junk 'n' Stuff and into the Man Cave. Captain Man is freed from the amber within the stump as Lulu Elena Chapa de Silva arrives claiming that it is her kicking stump ever since she lost the trail of the person who stole her phone. Captain Man is freed by Miles and forgives Henry while learning about Drex's memory-wiping plot. Mika, Miles, and Lulu head to Planes-A-Plenty. With the cavemen holding everyone captive, Jasper finally finishes his sleep-fighting audiobook, where he starts to beat up the cavemen. With the blimp inflated, Drex finally can get his memory-wiping plot started as Bose meets Mika, Miles, and Lulu. Drex subdues the kids when they try to defeat him. Captain Man and Kid Danger arrive to find that Jasper has defeated the cavemen. Jake arrives from another Man Cave, where he pulled both shellgon crystals from the tube pads as an alert tells everyone to "run". Guest stars: Jeffrey Nicholas Brown as Jake, Kelly Sullivan as Kris, Havan Flores as Chapa, Terrence Little Gardenhigh as Miles, Dana Heath as Mika, Luca Luhan as Bose, Tommy Walker as Drex
121	39	"The Fate of Danger: Part II"	Steve Hoefer	Christopher J. Nowak	March 21, 2020	540	1.26
Because of Jake's mistake, the Man Caves are exploding one by one. Captain Man and Kid Danger catch up to Drex at Planes-A-Plenty, where they plan to use the Omega Weapon only for the two cavemen with him to interfere. Schwoz, Bose, Mika, Miles, and Chapa get free as Henry reassembles the weapon and uses it on Captain Man and Drex. Only Drex was unaffected as he starts to take off with the Memory Wiper. As Charlotte works to keep the remaining Man Caves from exploding, Captain Man and Kid Danger catch up to Drex in the sky and work to prevent him from erasing the memories of Swellview's citizens. When the two cavemen attack Schwoz, Chapa gets exposed to the Omega Weapon's energies and develops electrokinesis to use on the cavemen. The energies also affects Miles, Mika, and Bose, with Miles gaining teleportation and Bose levitation. Drex strangles Captain Man and throws him off the blimp only to be saved by Jasper's drone. Drex rips the blimp as he falls off. Schwoz informs them that they are on a crash course to Swellview Baby Hospital. Jasper uses the drone to fly Drex to Swellview Prison. Kid Danger states that one of them will have to use the spear to steer into Mount Swellview as Captain Man wants to sacrifice himself. Kid Danger activates Captain Man's parachute as he advises Charlotte and Jasper to get out of the Man Cave. Kid Danger starts glowing as he heads straight to Mt. Swellview. The next day, Vice-Mayor Willard preside over Kid Danger's memorial which is attended by friends and foes alike. After changing back to Ray, he finds Henry who now has forcefield abilities with Ray mentioning that his indestructible abilities are slowly being restored. Ray states to Henry that it is time for him to leave Swellview since he is a hero now. Miles, Mika, Chapa, and Bose state to Henry and Ray that they have taken the name of Danger Force. Vice-Mayor Willard unveils two statues of Kid Danger as Henry takes his leave. In Dystopia, Henry, Charlotte, and Jasper are living their new lives as Henry is now operating as the local superhero with the help of Charlotte and Jasper. A few weeks later, Ray and Schwoz open the Swellview Academy of the Gifted to teach the Danger Force how to be superheroes. Guest stars: Jeffrey Nicholas Brown as Jake, Kelly Sullivan as Kris, Carrie Barrett as Mary, Jill Benjamin as Miss Shapen, Timothy Brennen as Vice Mayor Willard, Andrew Caldwell as Mitch Bilsky, Havan Flores as Chapa, Terrence Little Gardenhigh as Miles, Ben Giroux as The Toddler, Ryan Grassmeyer as Jeff, Dana Heath as Mika, Leslie Korein as Fran, Luca Luhan as Bose, Alec Mapa as Jack Frittleman, Mike Ostroski as Dr. Minyak, Winston Story as Trent, Tommy Walker as Drex

== See also ==
- List of Henry Danger characters
