= Henry Danger: The Movie =

2025 superhero comedy film

- Release poster
- Directed by: Joe Menendez
- Screenplay by: Jake Farrow; Christopher J. Nowak
- Based on: Henry Danger by: Dan Schneider; Dana Olsen
- Produced by: Julia Pistor
- Starring: Jace Norman; Sean Ryan Fox; Ella Anderson; Michael D. Cohen; Frankie Grande; Glee Dango; Andre Tricoteux
- Cinematography: Christopher Charles Kempinski
- Edited by: Steve Haugen
- Music by: Paul Edward-Francis
- Production companies: Nickelodeon Movies; Yes Yes Coffee
- Distributed by: Nickelodeon; Paramount+
- Release date: January 17, 2025
- Running time: 86 minutes
- Country: United States
- Language: English

Henry Danger: The Movie is a 2025 American superhero comedy film based on the Nickelodeon television series Henry Danger (2014–2020). It was directed by Joe Menendez from a screenplay by frequent series writers Jake Farrow and Christopher J. Nowak. Jace Norman reprised his role as Henry Hart along with additional returning cast members Sean Ryan Fox, Ella Anderson, Michael D. Cohen, and Frankie Grande, with Glee Dango and Andre Tricoteux joining the cast and a special appearance by Cooper Barnes.

Henry Danger: The Movie was released simultaneously on Nickelodeon and Paramount+ on January 17, 2025.

== Plot ==
In Swellview, scientists at Evil Science Corp successfully manufacture the reality altering device (R.A.D.). During its transportation to a secure vault, the guards fail to notice a Kid Danger toy strategically placed in a nearby window. Within moments of securing the R.A.D., an infiltrator disguised as Kid Danger - Missy Martin, a devoted Kid Danger fan - steals the device. Pursued by several guards, Missy skillfully evades and incapacitates them, escaping with the R.A.D. Back at her home, adorned with memorabilia of the superhero, she prepares to use the R.A.D. to bring Kid Danger back to life. Unbeknownst to her, Henry Hart, the real Kid Danger, had faked his death and moved to Dystopia to fight crime alongside Jasper Dunlop, who had honed unique skills such as fighting in his sleep and speaking Spanish.

Meanwhile, in Dystopia, Jasper assures Detective Jones that Henry will soon arrive, attempting to flirt with her before Piper Hart and Schwoz Schwartz interrupt. They are visiting to support Henry after Charlotte Page's departure for Harvard. Embarrassed by their attempts to help his romantic prospects, Jasper warns them of an imminent attack by the supervillain Blackout who seeks to steal plutonium from a truck to destroy Dystopia's nuclear core. When the city is plunged into darkness, Henry abandons a public event to intervene. Schwoz hacks into surveillance to locate the truck, while Jasper, using his techno-band, fights Blackout in an alley. Henry joins the fray, countering Blackout's attacks and ultimately defeating him in a public display, much to the delight of his fans. However, a dispute with Jasper over recognition and fame leads to a heated argument, straining their friendship.

Back at his building, Henry discovers that Blackout has defaced his posters in anger. Simultaneously, Missy activates the R.A.D., bringing her fan-fiction The Adventures of Kid Danger & Superfan, to life. She transports Henry into her room, where he finds himself wearing an upgraded Kid Danger suit. Overwhelmed, Henry questions Missy's motives. She confesses her desire to bring him back to fight the rising crime in Newtown, inspired by a traumatic mugging incident. Henry, however, admits that he had faked his death to start fresh in Dystopia, leaving Missy both shocked and thrilled. Despite Missy's pleas to team up as vigilantes, Henry declines, insisting on returning to Dystopia.

As they debate, a fictional villain from Missy's stories, Coach Cregg, appears and attacks a woman. Henry reluctantly intervenes but is overpowered, realizing that Missy's fan-fiction has altered his abilities. Missy saves him using the R.A.D., but their troubles escalate when Vampiper, an electrokinetic vampire version of Piper Missy created out of spite when she was kicked out of the Kid Danger fan club, arrives intent on obtaining the device. The two narrowly escape, unaware Vampiper stole a crystal from the device. Henry and Missy end up in another reality, this time an '80s-themed nightclub, where they encounter alternate versions of Frankini, Piper, and Jasper (who operates as Captain Stache, with Henry's as sidekick). Henry discovers that the R.A.D. has locked them into "story mode," forcing them to travel through Missy's fanfiction realities. After a humiliating defeat by Couch Cregg, Henry contemplates his treatment towards Jasper.

Henry and Missy have an alternate version of Schwoz to look at the R.A.D., but before he can tell them anything, Frankini interrupts them, causing the device to send him, Henry, and Missy back to Newtown. They encounter Vampiper and Coach Cregg, with the former biting Frankini, turning him into her loyal vampire servant before Henry and Missy can escape.

In an apocalyptic setting, Henry and Missy encounter a survivalist Jasper variant who helps them fend off Canadian Mounties. Together, they use clever tactics to defeat the attackers, further deepening Henry's appreciation for his real-world friendship with Jasper. The group then seeks the help of post-apocalyptic Schwoz, who explains that they need the crystal that is now in Vampiper's possession to return to their original reality. Henry realizes that if Vampiper can turn Schwoz into her servant, she can make him take her into Missy's other stories and make a vampiric army before invading the real world. Though initially blaming herself for the chaos, Missy finds encouragement in Henry's support, prompting her to continue the fight. Determined, the team prepares to face Vampiper in Newtown.

Back in Newtown, Vampiper has captured Missy's sister Gemma as a hostage. Despite setbacks, including Coach Cregg's whistle incapacitating the team, Henry and Missy launch a daring rescue mission. Inside the house, Henry battles Vampiper, while Missy heroically sacrifices herself to secure the crystal, urging Henry to complete their mission. Although Vampiper summons reinforcements like Fangkini, Henry manages to pass the crystal to post-apocalyptic Schwoz, who prepares to restore reality.

The final confrontation sees Henry, Jasper, and Schwoz battling Vampiper and her minions. Despite overwhelming odds, post-apocalyptic Schwoz successfully inserts the crystal into the R.A.D., reversing the chaos and restoring order. Missy and Henry reconcile, with Henry acknowledging her bravery and growth. As the realities collapse back into place with the alternate Frankini returned to his reality, Henry returning to Dystopia with a renewed appreciation for his friends, and Missy vowing to continue making a difference in Newtown, inspired by her brief partnership with Kid Danger.

Reconciling with Jasper, Henry hears that Blackout is attacking again. He and Jasper managed to defeat Blackout as he allows Jasper to take the credit for Blackout's defeat and get a date with Detective Jones. After going to a show with Schwoz and Piper, Henry visits Newtown the next day with Jasper and Schwoz as they drive off two punks that were bothering Missy. Henry invites her to be his sidekick which she accepts as they head to their new headquarters.

Sometime later, Henry and Missy arrive at the scene of a crime where they find Captain Man defeating some drones. Captain Man tells Henry that he needs Henry's help.

During the credits, the alternate Frankini is seen performing in the '80s-themed nightclub.

== Cast ==
- Jace Norman as Henry Hart / Kid Danger, a superhero operating in Dystopia
- Sean Ryan Fox as Jasper Dunlop, Henry's friend who helps him out in Dystopia where he can sleep-fight while speaking Spanish at the same time
  - Fox also portrays Captain Stache, a moustached superhero version of Jasper from another reality
- Ella Anderson as Piper Hart, the sister of Henry Hart
  - Anderson also portrays Vampiper, an electrical vampire version of Piper from Missy's fan-fiction that was brought to life
- Michael D. Cohen as Schwoz Schwartz, an inventor friend of Henry Hart
- Frankie Grande as Frankini, a variant of the internet celebrity enemy of Captain Man and Henry Hart who is a pop music star in Captain Stache's reality
- Glee Dango as Missy Martin / Superfan, a girl who is a superfan of Kid Danger
- Andre Tricoteux as Coach Cregg, a coach-themed villain from Missy's fan-fiction that was brought to life
- Cooper Barnes as Ray Manchester / Captain Man, a superhero that Henry used to be the sidekick of
- Eric Mazimpaka as Blackout, a hooded robed villain who targeted Dystopia's plutonium supply
- Rachael Drance as Detective Jones, a police detective operating in Dystopia
- Breeze Dango as Gemma Martin, Missy's little sister

=== Voices ===
- Trevor Devall as Blackout
- Daran Norris as the Narrator

== Production ==
In May 2017, the president of Viacom's Nickelodeon group announced that a film based on Henry Danger was being developed. In January 2022, it was announced that Jace Norman would be returning to Nickelodeon with a major deal to produce and star in original content across all ViacomCBS platforms. As part of the deal, Norman would reprise his role as Henry Hart (Kid Danger) in a Henry Danger movie.

=== Filming ===
Principal photography began on March 11, 2024 in Vancouver and Richmond, British Columbia, and wrapped on April 18.

== Release ==
Henry Danger: The Movie premiered on Nickelodeon and Paramount+ simultaneously on January 17, 2025.

== Reception ==
=== Critical response ===
The film was met with mostly positive critical reviews. Nick Williams of Feature First gave the film a 4-out-of-5-star rating, stating, "I'm left impressed and relieved as it feels like a good continuation of the franchise." Fernanda Camargo of Common Sense Media gave the film a 3-out-of-5-star rating, stating that "this movie is satisfying for fans of the series, and a fair introduction for new viewers." Paul Asay of Plugged In states, "Henry Danger: The Movie is both clever and crass—and for those unfamiliar with the original show, the latter may be a deal-killer."

=== Viewership ===
The film received nearly 140,000 viewers on the day of its aired premiere.

=== Accolades ===
Award	Year	Category	Recipients	Result
Nickelodeon Kids' Choice Awards	2025	Favorite Villain	Frankie Grande	Nominated
Nickelodeon Kids' Choice Awards	2025	Favorite Butt-Kicker	Jace Norman	Nominated
Leo Awards	2025	Best Costume Design in a Television Movie	Farnaz Khaki-Sadigh	Won
Children's and Family Emmy Awards	2026	Outstanding Fiction Special	Paul Edward-Francis	Nominated
