= Michael D. Cohen (actor) =

Canadian actor (born 1975)

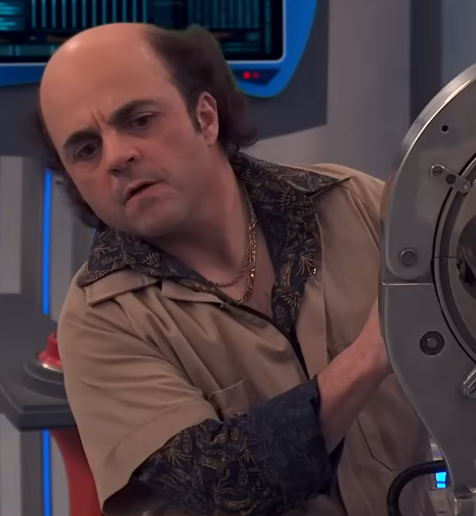
- Cohen playing Schwoz Schwartz in Henry Danger
- Born: November 22, 1975 (age 50); Winnipeg, Manitoba, Canada
- Occupation: Actor
- Known for: Henry Danger
- Website: michaeldcohen.com

Michael Dylan Cohen (born November 22, 1975) is a Canadian actor. He is known for his role as Schwoz Schwartz in Henry Danger and its spin offs, The Adventures of Kid Danger, Danger Force, and Henry Danger: The Movie.

== Early life ==
Born in Winnipeg, Cohen started transitioning from female to male in his 20s, making the information publicly known only in 2019.

== Career ==
Cohen began his career playing female roles. Following his gender transition in 2000, he appeared in Moville Mysteries, Queer as Folk, Doc, RoboRoach, and Henry's World, as well as many commercials. In 2005, he won the national Moc Docs award for Best Mockumentary for his short film Jew Jube Lives—a rap parody based on the question, "If Eminem were Jewish and grew up in Thornhill, what would he be like?" He was the voice of Ty Archer in the animated TV series Grossology for which he and the ensemble received a Gemini Award nomination, the Canadian equivalent of an Emmy.

Since 2014, Cohen has played Schwoz Schwartz, a tech genius on the sitcom Henry Danger, a role he continues in the Henry Danger spinoff series Danger Force. He has appeared on shows such as Modern Family, The Real O'Neals, 2 Broke Girls, The Mindy Project, Backstrom, Eagleheart and Austin & Ally. His recent film credits include the comedy Suburbicon, directed by George Clooney and written by the Coen brothers; the Oscar-nominated film Whiplash; and the Canadian Screen Award-nominated film It Was You Charlie, for which he was nominated for an ACTRA Award for Outstanding Lead Performance.

Cohen has dozens of commercial credits including Mini Starburst, FedEx, Capital One, Boston Market, Honda (with Patrick Warburton), and the Super Bowl Hulu Plus campaign with Will Arnett. Cohen was co-chair of the SAG-AFTRA Hollywood Conservatory at the American Film Institute, and is a member of the National SAG-AFTRA Conservatory Committee.

== Personal life ==
Cohen has a master's degree in adult education focusing on transformative education for performers. He offers acting workshops and private audition coaching for actors in L.A., Toronto and around the world. He lives in Los Angeles.

== Filmography ==
Film roles
Year	Title	Role	Notes
2013	It Was You Charlie	Abner	
2014	Whiplash	Overbrook Stagehand	
2016	Generation Wolf	Luke	
2017	Suburbicon	Stretch	
2018	An Evening with Beverly Luff Linn	Mitch Stemp	
2020	Disclosure: Trans Lives on Screen	Himself	Documentary
2023	Glisten and the Merry Mission	Snowman	Voice
2025	Henry Danger: The Movie	Schwoz	

Television roles
Year	Title	Role	Notes
2002	Moville Mysteries	Milo "Fibber" Kryzinski	4 episodes
2002	Doc	Orderly	Episode: "On Pins and Needles"
2002	Henry's World	Plutonian	Episodes: "Is Anybody Out There?/Secrets"
2003	RoboRoach	HappyChap	Episodes: "Shuttle Bugs/Rememberizing Rube"
2003	JoJo's Circus	Workmouse	Episodes: "The Confetti Caper/Jojo on the Tightrope"
2006	Time Warp Trio	Selim	Episode: "Harem Scare Em"
2009	My Name Is Earl	Guy	Episode: "My Name Is Alias"
2009	Tim and Eric Awesome Show, Great Job!	Partyer / Ball Retriever	Episodes: "Road Trip", "Tennis"
2009	Eastwick	Fidel's Manservant	3 episodes
2006–2009	Grossology	Ty Archer	Main voice role
2010	Wizards of Waverly Place	Cliff	Episode: "Uncle Ernesto"
2011	Modern Family	Odd Neighbor	Episode: "Door to Door"
2012	2 Broke Girls	Ticket Taker	Episode: "And the Hold-Up"
2013	Austin & Ally	Mr. Gower	Episode: "Freaky Friends & Fan Fiction"
2013–2014	Kickin' It	George Washington Waiter	Episodes: "Return of Spyfall", "Nerd with a Cape"
2014–2020	Henry Danger	Schwoz	Recurring role (seasons 1–4); main role (season 5)
2014	Eagleheart	Spats	Episode: "Spats"
2015	Backstrom	Tiny	Episode: "Ancient, Chinese, Secret"
2016	D-Sides	Carl	Episode: "Smells Of Solace"
2016	Shady Neighbors	Mr. Turner	Television film
2016	The Real O'Neals	Dr. Filbert	Episode: "The Real Book Club"
2017	Powerless	Samuel Greene	Episode: "Wayne Dream Team"
2017	Angie Tribeca	Louie	Episode: "Hey I'm Solvin' Here"
2018	Game Shakers	Schwoz	Episode: "Babe Loves Danger"
2018	The Adventures of Kid Danger	Schwoz	Main voice role
2019	All That	Himself	Episode 1105
2019	Vampirina	Blobby	Episode: "Nosy's Day In/Sincerely, Blobby"
2020–2024	Danger Force	Schwoz	Main role; also director (5 episodes), writer (1 episode)

Web-series roles
Year	Title	Role	Notes
2012	Talking Friends	Ben the Dog	Main role
2013–2014	It's a Small World: The Animated Series	Luis / Wazoh	Main role

== Accolades ==
Year	Award	Category	Work	Result	Refs
2009	Gemini Awards	Best Individual or Ensemble Performance in an Animated Program or Series	Grossology	Nominated	
2014	ACTRA Award	Outstanding Performance - Male	It Was You Charlie	Nominated	
