= The Adventures of Kid Danger =

American animated television series

- Genre: Animation; Comedy
- Created by: Dan Schneider
- Based on: Henry Danger by Dan Schneider & Dana Olsen
- Voices of: Jace Norman; Cooper Barnes; Michael D. Cohen; Riele Downs; Sean Ryan Fox; Ella Anderson; Jeffrey Nicholas Brown
- Theme music composer: Michael Corcoran
- Composer: Michael Corcoran
- Country of origin: United States
- Original language: English
- No. of seasons: 1
- No. of episodes: 12

Production
- Executive producer: Dan Schneider
- Producers: Patrick Inness; Lizbeth Velasco
- Running time: 22 minutes
- Production companies: Schneider's Bakery; Powerhouse Animation; Nickelodeon Productions; Nickelodeon Animation Studio

Original release
- Network: Nickelodeon
- Release: January 15 – June 14, 2018

Related
- Henry Danger

The Adventures of Kid Danger is an American animated comedy television series created by Dan Schneider that aired on Nickelodeon from January 15 to June 14, 2018. The series is based on Henry Danger and details the animated adventures of Kid Danger and Captain Man as they fight various villains and threats to Swellview.

== Characters ==
- Henry / Kid Danger (voiced by Jace Norman) is the sidekick of Captain Man.
- Ray / Captain Man (voiced by Cooper Barnes) is Swellview's resident superhero.
- Schwoz (voiced by Michael D. Cohen) is an inventor that works for Captain Man and Kid Danger.
- Charlotte (voiced by Riele Downs) is one of Henry's friends.
- Jasper (voiced by Sean Ryan Fox) is one of Henry's friends.
- Piper (voiced by Ella Anderson) is the sister of Henry.
- Mr. Hart (voiced by Jeffrey Nicholas Brown) is the father of Henry and Piper.

== Production ==
Nickelodeon greenlit the animated series, under the working title The Adventures of Kid Danger and Captain Man, on March 2, 2017, and ordered 10 episodes. The series is executive produced by Dan Schneider. Previous to its television run, it debuted in July 2015 as a Nickelodeon short-form digital series, also created by Schneider.

== Broadcast ==
The series had a sneak peek of its first two segments as part of Henry Danger's "Toon in for Danger" on January 15, 2018. The Adventures of Kid Danger officially premiered on Nickelodeon on January 19, 2018. In Canada, the series premiered on February 9, 2018, on YTV. In the UK and Ireland, the series premiered on April 9, 2018, also paired with Henry Danger's "Toon in for Danger".

== Reception ==
=== Critical ===
Emily Ashby of Common Sense Media gave the series 2 out of 5 stars; saying that, "Animation suits the utterly ridiculous nature of these characters and their antics slightly better than did the live-action format, but it's still a low-tier pick for kids' viewing. If superheroes are to be judged on their eagerness to leap into action for others' sake, then Captain Man and Kid Danger are hardly worthy of sharing the title with the likes of Spiderman and Wonder Woman. When danger calls, these two are more likely to be found analyzing pieces of popcorn on a whim of looking for twins than they are hot on the trail of a baddie."

=== Ratings ===
Viewership and ratings per season of The Adventures of Kid Danger
Season	Episodes	First aired		Last aired		Avg. viewers (millions)
Season	Episodes	Date	Viewers (millions)	Date	Viewers (millions)	Avg. viewers (millions)
1	12	January 15, 2018	1.41	June 14, 2018	1.31	1.20

== Episodes ==
No.	Title	Directed by	Written by	Original release date	Prod. code	U.S. viewers (millions)
1	"Popcorn Monster"	Donovan Cook	Dan Schneider	January 15, 2018 (Note: This episode was shown as a sneak peek on January 15, 2018, and then as the official series premiere on January 19, 2018. The viewership data is 1.48 million viewers for the official premiere on January 19, 2018.)	101	1.41
1	"Game of Drones"	Régis Camargo and Zac Moncrief	Dan Schneider, Sean Gill, and Jana Petrosini	January 15, 2018	101	1.41
"Popcorn Monster": After Ray tries to find two exactly identical pieces of popcorn, he accidentally creates a Popcorn Monster with one of Schwoz's inventions. Then it's up to him and Henry to take the Popcorn Monster down. "Game of Drones": When Ray's drone gets destroyed, he has Schwoz shrink their airship and Henry down to miniature size using a miniaturization ray. Henry pilots the miniaturized airship in order to win the Drone Race that Captain Man had intended to enter in order to beat Dr. Minyak.
2	"Clone Babies"	Ashley Long	Dan Schneider and Jake Farrow	January 26, 2018	102	1.37
2	"Flying Spiders"	Damil Bryant	Dan Schneider	January 26, 2018	102	1.37
"Clone Babies": In order to lessen the work for Ray, Schwoz conceives the idea to use one of his inventions to clone Ray. Though the clones start out as babies that prove to be a handful for them. "Flying Spiders": Daddy Longlegs has placed a bomb in the sewers that will unleash an army of flying spiders. Now Captain Man and Kid Danger must race against time to get to the bomb before they are unleashed.
3	"Texas Weiners"	Damil Bryant	Dan Schneider and Joe Sullivan	February 2, 2018	103	1.35
3	"YooHoo Tube"	Donovan Cook	Dan Schneider and David Malkoff	February 2, 2018	103	1.35
"Texas Weiners": While working at a carnival, Captain Man and Kid Danger plan to obtain 1,000 wienies for a birthday party. Even with the help of Charlotte and Schwoz, they must also avoid Sheriff Puster and his son. "Yoohoo Tube": After one of Schwoz's experiments goes wrong, Captain Man and Kid Danger must use the instructions he posted online in order to save his life before his condition gets worse. Meanwhile, Jasper reviews Sister Act 3 for download.
4	"OctoCharlotte"	Régis Camargo and Zac Moncrief	Dan Schneider and Andrew Reese Thomas	February 9, 2018	104	1.22
4	"Trouble in Tropikini"	Ashley Long	Dan Schneider and Samantha Martin	February 9, 2018	104	1.22
"OctoCharlotte": Using one of his inventions, Schwoz accidentally turns Charlotte into a half-octopus creature. Now Captain Man and Kid Danger must catch her so that Schwoz can return her to normal. "Trouble in Tropikini": Ray, Henry, Charlotte, Jasper, and Schwoz are on vacation. When Jasper falls into the volcano, Captain Man and Kid Danger must rescue him from the Volcaniacs.
5	"Fish Talker"	Damil Bryant	Dan Schneider, Sean Gill, and Jana Petrosini	February 16, 2018	105	1.09
5	"Wet Doom"	Donovan Cook	Dan Schneider, Ben Adams, and Sam Becker	February 16, 2018	105	1.09
"Fish Talker": Using Schwoz' Fish Talker helmet, Captain Man and Kid Danger understand a lost fish named Gilligan and work to help him get home while evading sharks and defending his family from a killer whale. "Wet Doom": While at a restaurant, Ray, Henry, Charlotte, Jasper, and Schwoz get locked in the bathroom while it's flooding. While devising a way out before things get worse, they reminisce about past adventures they had.
6	"The Sushi Sitter"	Ashley Long	Dan Schneider and Rich Goodman	May 5, 2018	106	1.13
6	"Cheer Beast"	Régis Camargo and Zac Moncrief	Dan Schneider and Jake Farrow	May 5, 2018	106	1.13
"The Sushi Sitter": When school is over, Henry is about to skateboard home when he finds that Mitch Bilsky stole his wheels and used them for his sandwich skateboard. As Ray tries out the Sushi Sitter toilet that was previously tried out by Jon Lovitz, Henry covers for him as a Zipr driver where his passenger is Drill Finger who posed as Gibby Gibson from iCarly. "Cheer Beast": In order to prepare for the cheerleader tryouts, Piper tries Captain Man's discontinued health program which turns her into a beast. Captain Man and Kid Danger must work to cure her.
7	"Tiny Toddler"	Régis Camargo and Zac Moncrief	Dan Schneider, Curt Neill, and Michael C. Rogers	May 12, 2018	107	0.99
7	"Magical Beefery Tour"	Damil Bryant	Dan Schneider and Daniel Warren	May 12, 2018	107	0.99
"Tiny Toddler": Captain Man misplaces his size-changing ray and it falls into the clutches of the Toddler. Now Captain Man and Kid Danger must fight the Toddler in order to get it back before he uses it for his crimes. "Magical Beefery Tour": Kid Danger finds the golden pickle in his hamburger and wins a tour of Beefo's Beefery that was founded by Angus T. Beefo where he takes Captain Man with him as a guest. They are unaware that this is all a plot by Frankini and Goomer which involves Frankini getting more viewers by eating a hamburger made from "Danger Meat."
8	"The Wahoo Punch Bro"	Donovan Cook	Dan Schneider, Sean Gill, and Jana Petrosini	May 19, 2018	108	0.86
8	"Pink Rocket"	Ashley Long	Dan Schneider and Jake Farrow	May 19, 2018	108	0.86
"The Wahoo Punch Bro": A former drink mascot called the Wahoo Punch Bro is going on a rampage throughout Swellview by plowing through walls and shooting Wahoo Punch into people's mouths. As Captain Man and Kid Danger work to apprehend the Wahoo Punch Bro, they find that he plans to fill the Swellview Water Tower with Wahoo Punch and flood the town. "Pink Rocket": Captain Man gets Henry an embarrassing pink kiddie motor scooter. When Mitch Bilsky mocks it, Ray organizes a race between Henry and Mitch. Schwoz, Charlotte, and Jasper help Henry prepare the motor scooter for the upcoming race.
9	"Snooze Pods"	Damil Bryant	Dan Schneider, Sean Gill, and Jana Petrosini	June 11, 2018	109A	1.23
Jasper gets trapped in one of Schwoz' snooze pods causing Captain Man and Kid Danger to go in and rescue him. Though they also deal with a dream version of Jeff.
10	"Mad Wax"	Donovan Cook	Dan Schneider and Alejandro Bien-Willner	June 12, 2018	110A	1.21
Captain Man and Kid Danger are honored at the Celebrity Wax Museum, but they and the crowd of civilians are soon attacked by an army of wax figures brought to life by an angry girl named Quinn. Piper rescues Captain Man and Kid Danger to allow them time to come up with a plan to stop the attacking wax figures.
11	"Fails"	Ashley Long	Dan Schneider, Sean Gill, and Jana Petrosini	June 13, 2018	110B	1.24
Invisible Brad uploads multiple embarrassing "fail" videos of Captain Man and Kid Danger to the internet for public viewing in an attempt to coerce them into finding a way to make Brad visible again.
12	"Sticky Vicky"	Régis Camargo and Zac Moncrief	Dan Schneider, Sean Gill, and Jana Petrosini	June 14, 2018	109B	1.31
Miss Shapen takes her students on a field trip to the Museum of Celebrity Garbage with Ray helping to chaperone while Henry's parents are at the courthouse. When Sticky Vicky plans to steal the red wig that Ariana Grande wore when she portrayed Cat Valentine in Victorious and Sam & Cat, Captain Man and Kid Danger must work to catch her even when she gets them stuck to each other with her sticky spit.
