= Jace Norman =

American actor (born 2000)

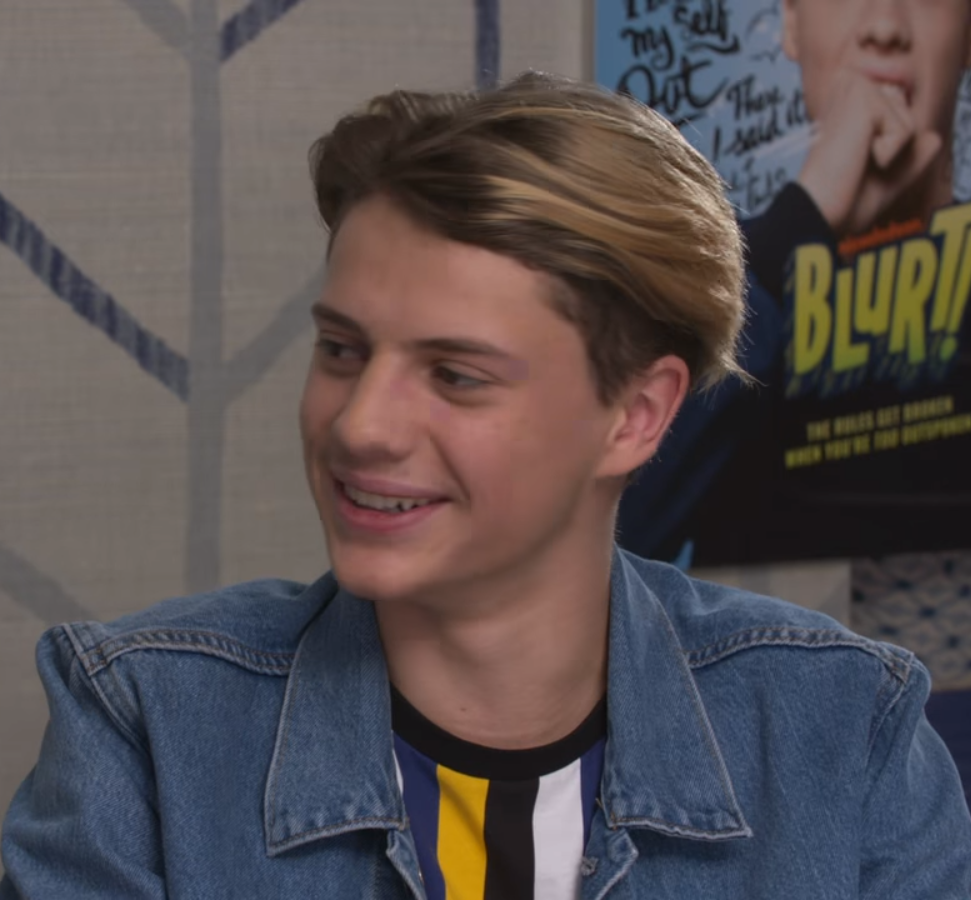
- Norman in 2018
- Born: Jace Lee Norman; March 21, 2000 (age 26); Corrales, New Mexico, U.S.
- Occupation: Actor
- Years active: 2012–present
- Known for: Henry Danger

Jace Lee Norman (born March 21, 2000) is an American actor. He is best known for his starring role as Henry Hart in the Nickelodeon superhero comedy series Henry Danger (2014–2020), the 2018 animated series, and the 2025 live-action film sequels. For Henry Danger, he won a record five consecutive Kids' Choice Awards.

== Early life ==
Jace Lee Norman was born in Corrales, New Mexico, on March 21, 2000. He moved to Southern California when he was 8. He was bullied for being dyslexic during middle school. He has an older brother and an older sister.

== Career ==
Norman started his acting career in 2012 with an appearance on Disney's television series Jessie. From 2014 to 2020, he played the lead role in Nickelodeon's sitcom Henry Danger. Norman has starred in the Nickelodeon Original Movies, Splitting Adam in 2015, and Rufus in 2016; a sequel to the latter, Rufus 2, aired on Nickelodeon in January 2017, with Norman reprising the starring role. He had his theatrical film debut as the lead voice role in the animated film Spark, released in April 2017. In 2019, he starred in the Nickelodeon Original Movie, Bixler High Private Eye, playing the lead role of Xander DeWitt. In 2017, 2018, 2019, and 2020, Norman won the Nickelodeon Kids' Choice Award for Favorite Male TV Star. He won his fifth Kids' Choice Award in a row for the same category in the 2021 Kids' Choice Awards. Since 2020, Norman has been a producer on the Nickelodeon series Danger Force, and has also appeared as a guest star in that series. In January 2022, it was announced that Norman will reprise his role in a Henry Danger film set to be released on Paramount+. In 2024, Jace Norman made his directorial debut in Danger Force Season 3 Episode 7 "Hey, Where's Schwoz?".

== Personal life ==
Norman has been actively engaging in business and entrepreneurship. He announced that he was opening a restaurant in his hometown Corrales, New Mexico on his Instagram in February 2023.

=== Creator Edge Media ===
Norman had been working on entrepreneurial endeavors prior to that, including his own company Creator Edge Media. The company’s essential goal was to bring big brands and social media accounts together to form a more efficient relationship. It was launched in early 2018 when he was 17 years old.

== Filmography ==
Television and film roles
Year	Title	Role	Notes
2012	Jessie	Finch	Episode: "Are You Cooler Than a 5th Grader"
2013	Deadtime Stories	Student	Episode: "Revenge of the Goblins"
2013	The Thundermans	Flunky	Episode: "You Stole My Thunder, Man"
2013	The Dumb Show	Jace	Television film
2014–2020	Henry Danger	Henry Hart / Kid Danger	Lead role; also producer for the final 11 episodes
2015	Splitting Adam	Adam Baker	Television film
2015	Webheads	Himself	Contestant; episode: "The Henry Danger Celebrity Edition"
2015	Nickelodeon's Ho Ho Holiday Special	Dilbert Palmero	Television special
2016	Rufus	Rufus	Television film
2017	Rufus 2	Rufus	Television film
2017	Nickelodeon's Not So Valentine's Special	Gilbert Palmero / Detective McTavish	Television special
2017	Spark	Spark	Film, voice role
2017	Nickelodeon's Sizzling Summer Camp	Cooper	Television special
2017	The Loud House	Steak Stankco	Voice role; episode: "Legends"
2018	The Adventures of Kid Danger	Henry / Kid Danger	Lead voice role
2018–2019	Game Shakers	Henry Hart	Episodes: "Babe Loves Danger", "He's Back"
2018	Blurt!	Jeremy Martin	Television film; also co-executive producer
2019	Bixler High Private Eye	Xander DeWitt	Television film; also executive producer
2019	The Substitute	Himself	Episode 1.1
2020	Bigfoot Family	Adam	English dub
2020–2024	Danger Force	Henry Hart	5 episodes; producer; director: "Hey, Where's Schwoz?"
2021	Golden State	Chase Scott	Unsold TV pilot
2025	Henry Danger: The Movie	Henry Hart / Kid Danger	Feature film; also executive producer

== Awards and nominations ==
Year	Award	Category	Work	Result	Refs
2016	Kids' Choice Awards	Favorite Male TV Star – Kids' Show	Henry Danger	Nominated	
2017	Kids' Choice Awards	Favorite Male TV Star – Kids' Show	Henry Danger	Won	
2018	Kids' Choice Awards	Favorite Male TV Star – Kids' Show	Henry Danger	Won	
2019	Kids' Choice Awards	Favorite Male TV Star – Kids' Show	Henry Danger	Won	
2020	Kids' Choice Awards	Favorite Male TV Star – Kids' Show	Henry Danger	Won	
2021	Kids' Choice Awards	Favorite Male TV Star – Kids' Show	Henry Danger & Danger Force	Won	
