= Ella Anderson =

American actress and singer-songwriter (born 2005)

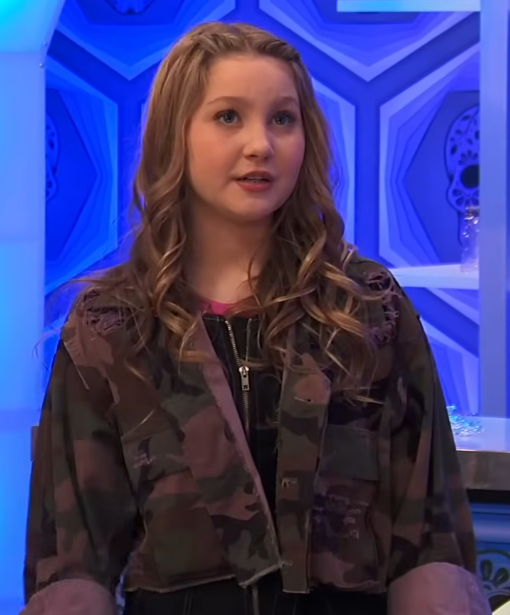
- Anderson playing Piper Hart in Henry Danger: The Musical (2019)
- Born: Ella Aiko Anderson; March 26, 2005 (age 21); Ypsilanti, Michigan, U.S.
- Occupations: Actress; singer; songwriter
- Years active: 2011–present
- Musical career
- Genres: Pop; R&B
- Instrument: Vocals
- Years active: 2020–present
- Label: Slow Down Sounds

Ella Aiko Anderson (born March 26, 2005) is an American actress and singer-songwriter. She began her career as a child actress, starring in roles such as Piper Hart on the Nickelodeon television series Henry Danger, and is also known for playing the role of Rachel Rawlings in the 2016 comedy adventure film The Boss.

== Early life ==
Anderson was born on March 26, 2005 in Ypsilanti, Michigan to Rebecca (née Whiteford) and Hans Anderson. She has two older brothers who are twins. She is of 1/8th Japanese descent on her father's side.

== Career ==
Anderson began as a child actress, acting since she was 5 years old. She played Hazel in Disney Channel's A.N.T. Farm in 2012. She also appeared in an episode of Raising Hope. She made further appearances on Disney shows in 2013, being in Dog with a Blog as Darcy Stewart and Liv and Maddie as Jenny Keene. In 2014, she played Mitzy in Nickelodeon's A Fairly Odd Summer. Anderson also portrayed Piper Hart in the Nickelodeon television series Henry Danger from 2014 to 2020, and appeared in the film Unfinished Business. She has played Rachel Rawlings in The Boss, and Vicky in Mother's Day, both films from 2016, and Jeannette Walls at age 11 opposite Brie Larson in the 2017 film The Glass Castle.

In 2015, Anderson started a YouTube channel, which opened up a music career, releasing her 1st single "Overanalyze" in 2020 and an EP Evolving in 2021, in which "Overanalyze" is featured.

Anderson reprised her role of Piper Hart in the Nickelodeon film derived from the show, Henry Danger: The Movie, which was released on January 17, 2025.

In 2025, Anderson portrayed the role of Rachel Cartwright in the biographical musical drama film Song Sung Blue alongside Hugh Jackman and Kate Hudson.

== Filmography ==
Film roles
Year	Title	Role	Notes
2014	The Possession of Michael King	Ellie King	
2015	Unfinished Business	Bess Trunkman	
2016	The Boss	Rachel Rawlings	
2016	Mother's Day	Vicky	
2017	The Glass Castle	Young Jeannette Walls	
2024	Suncoast	Brittany	
2025	Henry Danger: The Movie	Piper Hart	
2025	Song Sung Blue	Rachel Cartwright	

Television roles
Year	Title	Role	Notes
2011	Last Man Standing	Haley	Television film
2012	A.N.T. Farm	Hazel	2 episodes
2012	Raising Hope	Annie	Episode: "Squeak Means Squeak"
2013	Dog with a Blog	Darcy Stewart	2 episodes
2013	Liv and Maddie	Jenny Keene	Episode: "Fa-La-La-a-Rooney"
2014	A Fairly Odd Summer	Mitzy	Television film
2014	Law & Order: Special Victims Unit	Maddie Aschler	Episode: "Downloaded Child"
2014–2020	Henry Danger	Piper Hart	Main role
2015	Nickelodeon's Ho Ho Holiday Special	Olive	Television special
2015	Whisker Haven	Honeycake (voice)	2 episodes
2018	The Adventures of Kid Danger	Piper Hart (voice)	Main role
2018	Young Sheldon	Erica Swanson	Episode: "A Rival Prodigy and Sir Isaac Neutron"
2019	All That	Herself	1 episode

== Discography ==
=== Extended plays ===
List of EPs
Title	EP details
Evolving	Released: 21 January 2021; Label: Slow Down Sounds; Format: digital download, streaming

=== Singles ===
List of singles and album name
Title	Year	Album or EP
"Overanalyze"	2020	Evolving
"Clumsy"	2023	Non-album singles
"Only One"	2024	Non-album singles
"Puppy Dog"	2024	Non-album singles

== Awards and nominations ==
Award	Year	Category	Work	Result	Ref.
Kids' Choice Awards	2020	Favorite Female TV Star	Henry Danger	Nominated	
Kids' Choice Awards	2021	Favorite Female TV Star	Henry Danger	Nominated	
Young Artist Award	2013	Best Performance in a TV Series – Guest Starring Young Actress Ten and Under	A.N.T. Farm	Nominated	
