= Mike Caron =

American television director

- Born: St. Louis, Missouri
- Other name: Television director
- Years active: 1994–present

Michael Caron is an American television director and owner of production company Mike Caron Productions.

== Career ==
Caron began his career as an actor on the CBS television show Young and the Restless from 1995 to 1996. Caron was then asked to become a stage manager on Passions, despite having no background as a stage manager. After receiving more work on soap operas, he became associate director on Nickelodeon’s Drake & Josh. He later went on to continue working with Schneider's Bakery on Zoey 101, iCarly, Victorious, and Sam & Cat.

While working on Henry Danger and Game Shakers he started directing episodes of the shows. He later went on to direct Danger Force. In addition, Caron has directed a short film The Pick-Up. He later went on to be an executive producer for the live action series The Fairly OddParents: Fairly Odder based on the animated series The Fairly OddParents.
