= 2022 Kids' Choice Awards =

Children's television awards show program broadcast in 2022

- Date: April 9, 2022
- Location: Barker Hangar; Santa Monica, California
- Hosted by: Miranda Cosgrove; Rob Gronkowski
- Most awards: Spider-Man: No Way Home and High School Musical: The Musical: The Series (3)
- Most nominations: Adele, Cobra Kai, Danger Force, High School Musical: The Musical: The Series, iCarly, Taylor Swift, and The SpongeBob Movie: Sponge on the Run (4)

Television/radio coverage
- Network: Nickelodeon; TeenNick; Nicktoons; Nick Jr. Channel
- Runtime: 92 minutes
- Viewership: 0.59 million
- Produced by: Melissa M. Hill
- Directed by: Glenn Weiss

The 35th Annual Nickelodeon Kids' Choice Awards ceremony was held on April 9, 2022, at the Barker Hangar in Santa Monica, California with Miranda Cosgrove and Rob Gronkowski serving as hosts. It aired live on Nickelodeon and in a domestic simulcast with several other Paramount Global cable networks, and was broadcast live or tape delayed across all of Nickelodeon's international networks.

As a result of the COVID-19 pandemic, it was the first Kids' Choice Awards ceremony since the 2019 show to feature a live audience. The ceremony, which was the first since the 2004 show to have two hosts, featured one thousand slimings as well as performances from Kid Cudi and Jack Harlow. Following the ceremony, a "Slime Cut" version of the show hosted by Young Dylan became available to stream on Paramount+ on April 12.

BTS continued their Guinness World Record for 'Most Nickelodeon Kids' Choice Awards blimps won by a music group', extending to six wins after winning the 'Favorite Music Group' category for the third consecutive year. This also tied them for the most wins within the 'Favorite Music Group' category with The Black Eyed Peas (who won non-consecutively in 2007, 2010, and 2011), One Direction (who also won consecutively 2013–2015), and Fifth Harmony (who also won consecutively 2016–2018).

A new episode of Danger Force led into the ceremony, while a linear premiere of a new episode of iCarly served as the lead-out.

== Appearances ==
Prior to the ceremony, Owen Holt and Txunamy hosted an Orange Carpet livestream on the Nickelodeon YouTube channel.

The ceremony featured appearances by celebrities including Jayden Bartels, Brie and Nikki Bella, Sabrina Carpenter, Sofia Carson, Milan Carter, Chance the Rapper, Simon Cowell, Isaiah Crews, Terry Crews, Charli and Dixie D'Amelio, Isla Fisher, Jordan Fisher, Kate Godfrey, Gabrielle Nevaeh Green, Kevin Hart, Samuel L. Jackson, Karl Jacobs, Heidi Klum, Jules LeBlanc, Peyton List, Ralph Macchio, Howie Mandel, Christopher Martinez, Ariana Molkara, MrBeast, Jace Norman, Josh Peck, Charlie Puth, Anton Starkman, Unspeakable, Sofía Vergara, and Xavier Woods. First Lady of the United States, Jill Biden, also made an appearance at the ceremony.

Presenters at the 2022 Kids' Choice Awards
Presenter(s)	Role
Chloe & Halle Bailey	Presented 'Favorite Male Creator'
Nikki & Brie Bella Karl Jacobs	Presented 'Favorite Reality Show'
That Girl Lay Lay Young Dylan	Introduced Jack Harlow
Peyton List Ralph Macchio	Presented 'Favorite Female Creator'
Dwayne Johnson Kevin Hart	Preview of DC League of Super-Pets
Gabrielle Union Charlie Puth	Presented 'Favorite Breakout Artist'
Miranda Cosgrove	Introduced Jill Biden
Xavier Woods Josh Peck	Presented 'Favorite Male TV Star (Kids)'
My Squishy Little Dumplings	Presented 'Favorite Female Sports Star', 'Favorite Male TV Star (Family)', 'Favorite Voice from an Animated Movie', 'Favorite Male Artist', 'Favorite Music Collaboration', 'Favorite Female Artist', 'Favorite Male Sports Star', and 'Favorite Global Music Star'
Sofia Carson Jordan Fisher	Presented 'Favorite Social Music Star'
Samuel L. Jackson	Preview of Paws of Fury: The Legend of Hank
Jace Norman Unspeakable	Introduced Kid Cudi
Sabrina Carpenter	Presented 'Favorite Family TV Show'
Isla Fisher	Presented 'Favorite Movie'

== Performers ==
Performers at the 2022 Kids' Choice Awards
Performer(s)	Song(s)
Jack Harlow	"Nail Tech" "Industry Baby" "First Class"
Kid Cudi	"Stars in the Sky" "Pursuit of Happiness (Steve Aoki Remix)"

== Winners and nominees ==
The nominees were announced and voting opened on March 9, 2022. Voting ended on April 9, 2022. The winners are listed first, highlighted in boldfaced text.

=== Movies ===
Favorite Movie	Favorite Movie Actor
**Spider-Man: No Way Home**; Cinderella; Clifford the Big Red Dog; Jungle Cruise; Space Jam: A New Legacy; Tom & Jerry: The Movie	**Tom Holland** – Spider-Man: No Way Home as Peter Parker / Spider-Man; John Cena – F9: The Fast Saga as Jakob Toretto; Vin Diesel – F9: The Fast Saga as Dominic Toretto; LeBron James – Space Jam: A New Legacy as himself; Dwayne Johnson – Jungle Cruise as Frank Wolff & Red Notice as John Hartley; Ryan Reynolds – Free Guy as Guy & Red Notice as Nolan Booth
Favorite Movie Actress	Favorite Animated Movie
**Zendaya** – Spider-Man: No Way Home as MJ & Dune as Chani; Emily Blunt – Jungle Cruise as Lily Houghton; Camila Cabello – Cinderella as Cinderella; Scarlett Johansson – Black Widow as Natasha Romanoff; Angelina Jolie – Eternals as Thena; Emma Stone – Cruella as Estella / Cruella	**Encanto**; Luca; Paw Patrol: The Movie; Sing 2; The Boss Baby: Family Business; The SpongeBob Movie: Sponge on the Run
Favorite Voice from an Animated Movie
**Scarlett Johansson** – Sing 2 as Ash; Awkwafina – The SpongeBob Movie: Sponge on the Run as Otto & Raya and the Last Dragon as Sisu; Tom Kenny – The SpongeBob Movie: Sponge on the Run as SpongeBob; Keanu Reeves – The SpongeBob Movie: Sponge on the Run as Sage; Charlize Theron – The Addams Family 2 as Morticia Addams; Reese Witherspoon – Sing 2 as Rosita

=== Television ===
Favorite Kids TV Show	Favorite Male TV Star (Kids)
**High School Musical: The Musical: The Series**; Are You Afraid of the Dark?; Danger Force; Raven's Home; That Girl Lay Lay; The Baby-Sitters Club	**Joshua Bassett** – High School Musical: The Musical: The Series as Ricky; Raphael Alejandro – Bunk'd as Matteo Silva; Cooper Barnes – Danger Force as Ray Manchester / Captain Man; Young Dylan – Young Dylan as Young Dylan; Bryce Gheisar – The Astronauts as Elliott Combs & Are You Afraid of the Dark? as Luke McCoy; Luca Luhan – Danger Force as Bose / Brainstorm
Favorite Female TV Star (Kids)	Favorite Family TV Show
**Olivia Rodrigo** – High School Musical: The Musical: The Series as Nini; Malia Baker – The Baby-Sitters Club as Mary Anne Spier & Are You Afraid of the Dark? as Gabby Lewis; Havan Flores – Danger Force as Chapa / Volt; Raven-Symoné – Raven's Home as Raven Baxter; That Girl Lay Lay – That Girl Lay Lay as Lay Lay; Sofia Wylie – High School Musical: The Musical: The Series as Gina	**iCarly**; Cobra Kai; The Flash; Loki; WandaVision; Young Sheldon
Favorite Male TV Star (Family)	Favorite Female TV Star (Family)
**Tom Hiddleston** – Loki as Loki; Iain Armitage – Young Sheldon as Sheldon Cooper; Nathan Kress – iCarly as Freddie Benson; Ralph Macchio – Cobra Kai as Daniel LaRusso; Jeremy Renner – Hawkeye as Clint Barton; Jerry Trainor – iCarly as Spencer Shay	**Miranda Cosgrove** – iCarly as Carly Shay; Peyton List – Cobra Kai as Tory Nichols; Mary Mouser – Cobra Kai as Samantha LaRusso; Elizabeth Olsen – WandaVision as Wanda Maximoff / Scarlet Witch; Yara Shahidi – Black-ish/Grown-ish as Zoey Johnson; Hailee Steinfeld – Hawkeye as Kate Bishop
Favorite Reality Show	Favorite Cartoon
**America's Got Talent**; American Idol; Kids Baking Championship; Lego Masters; The Masked Singer; Wipeout	**SpongeBob SquarePants**; Jurassic World Camp Cretaceous; Looney Tunes Cartoons; Teen Titans Go!; The Loud House; The Smurfs

=== Music ===
Favorite Music Group	Favorite Male Artist
**BTS**; Black Eyed Peas; Florida Georgia Line; Jonas Brothers; Maroon 5; Migos	**Ed Sheeran**; Bruno Mars; Drake; Justin Bieber; Shawn Mendes; The Weeknd
Favorite Female Artist	Favorite Song
**Ariana Grande**; Adele; Billie Eilish; Cardi B; Lady Gaga; Taylor Swift	**"Happier Than Ever"** – Billie Eilish; "Easy on Me" – Adele; "Up" – Cardi B; "Bad Habits" – Ed Sheeran; "All Too Well (Taylor's Version)" – Taylor Swift; "Take My Breath" – The Weeknd
Favorite Album	Favorite Breakout Artist
**Happier Than Ever** – Billie Eilish; 30 – Adele; Justice – Justin Bieber; Certified Lover Boy – Drake; Fearless (Taylor's Version) – Taylor Swift; Red (Taylor's Version) – Taylor Swift	**Olivia Rodrigo**; Chlöe; Glass Animals; Jack Harlow; Saweetie; Walker Hayes
Favorite Music Collaboration	Favorite Social Music Star
**"Stay"** – The Kid Laroi & Justin Bieber; "Beautiful Mistakes" – Maroon 5 featuring Megan Thee Stallion; "Best Friend" – Saweetie featuring Doja Cat; "Leave Before You Love Me" – Marshmello & Jonas Brothers; "Rumors" – Lizzo featuring Cardi B; "Save Your Tears" – The Weeknd & Ariana Grande	**Dixie D'Amelio**; JoJo Siwa; Johnny Orlando; Addison Rae; That Girl Lay Lay; Oliver Tree
Favorite Global Music Star
**Adele** (UK); BTS (Asia); Camilo (Latin America); Olivia Rodrigo (North America); Rosalía (Europe); Tems (Africa); Tones and I (Australia)

=== Sports ===
Favorite Male Sports Star	Favorite Female Sports Star
**Tom Brady**; Stephen Curry; LeBron James; Patrick Mahomes II; Cristiano Ronaldo; Shaun White	**Chloe Kim**; Sasha Banks; Simone Biles; Naomi Osaka; Candace Parker; Serena Williams

=== Miscellaneous ===
Favorite Male Creator	Favorite Female Creator
**MrBeast**; Austin Creed; Ninja; Ryan's World; Spencer X; Unspeakable	**Charli D'Amelio**; Addison Rae; Emma Chamberlain; Kids Diana Show; Lexi Rivera; Miranda Sings
Favorite Video Game
**Minecraft**; Brookhaven; Just Dance 2022; Mario Party Superstars

== International ==
The following are nominations for awards to be given by Nickelodeon's international networks.

Favorite Star (Africa)	Favorite Kidfluencer (Africa)
Makhadzi; Focalistic; Major League DJz; Pitso Mosimane; Tems	Sbahle Mzizi; Adaeze Onuigbo; Masaka Kids Africana; Sassy Taylor Morrison; Uncle Vinny; Witney Ramabulana
Aussie/Kiwi Legend of the Year	Favorite Star (Belgium)
Savannah Clarke - Now United; Sam Kerr; Calvin & Kaison; Georgie Stone; Josh Giddey	CAMILLE; Axel Witsel; Lost Frequencies; Stromae
Favorite Family (Netherlands & Belgium)	Favorite Star (Netherlands)
The Plas family; The Asporaat family; The Flex family; The Janzen family; The Planckaert family	Max Verstappen; Emma Heesters; Freek Vonk; Nesim el Ahmadi; Tabitha
Brazilian Influencer	Brazilian Artist
Juliette; Luccas Abreu; Pequena Lo; Virginia; Enaldinho; Boca Rosa	Anitta; Manu Gavassi; Vitor Kley; Dilsinho; Zé Felipe; Agnes Nunes
Favorite Singer (Germany, Austria & Switzerland)	Favorite Song (Germany, Austria & Switzerland)
Lena; LEA; Luna; Mark Forster; Nico Santos; Zoe Wees	"Girls Like Us" – Zoe Wees; "blau" – Luna; "Faded Love" – Leony; "Stark" – Sarah Connor
Favorite Social Media Star (Germany, Austria & Switzerland)	Favorite Crew (Germany, Austria & Switzerland)
Younes Zarou; julesboringlife; Karim Jamal; Nic Kaufmann; Tina Neumann; Twenty4Tim	Elevator Boys (Elevator Mansion); Gewitter im Kopf; Rocket Beans; Spotlight Cast
Favorite Footballer (Germany, Austria & Switzerland)	Favorite Star (Hungary)
Lea Schüller; Christopher Nkunku; Florian Wirtz; Jude Bellingham; Laura Freigang; Nicole Billa	Dorci Pap; Fanni Illés; Kristóf Milák; Zóra Palkovics
Favorite Social Star (Italy)	Favorite Singer (Italy)
Alessia Lanza; Ambra Cotti; Captain Blazer; Giulia Sara Salemi; Michelle Cavallaro	AKA 7even; Alfa; Deddy; Elodie; Sangiovanni
Favorite Comic Star (Italy)	Favorite Influencer (Latin America)
Mattia Stanga; Khaby Lame; Kiro Ebra; LolloBarollo; Rametta	Fede Vigevani y la Vecibanda; Jashlem; Jimena Jiménez; Yolo Aventuras; Los Polinesios; Skabeche
Favorite Artist (Latin America)	Favorite Star (Arabia)
Camilo; Sebastián Yatra; Piso 21; Danna Paola; Rauw Alejandro; María Becerra	Anasala Family; AboFlah; Issam Alnajjar; Noor Stars
Favorite Star (Poland)	Favorite Influencer (Poland)
Sanah; Daria Zawiałow; Dawid Kwiatkowski; Natalia Szroeder; Roxie Węgiel	Kinga Sawczuk; Cookie Mint; Maria Jeleniewska; Mela Modela; Twins Style
Favorite Internet Star (Portugal)	Favorite Star (Romania)
Inês Teixeira; Constanza Ariza; Teresa Bonvalot; Tiago Leitão	Cătălin Ionuț; Antonio Pican; Iuliana Beregoi; Louis Florea
Favorite Artist (Spain)	Favorite Influencer (Spain)
Alexity; David Rees; Melani; Samantha	Indy; Lu; Silvia Sánchez; Marru
