= 2023 Kids' Choice Awards =

Children's television awards show program broadcast in 2023

- Date: March 4, 2023
- Location: Microsoft Theater; Los Angeles, California
- Hosted by: Nate Burleson; Charli D'Amelio
- Most awards: Harry Styles (3)
- Most nominations: Stranger Things (6)

Television/radio coverage
- Network: Nickelodeon; TeenNick; Nicktoons; Nick Jr. Channel; TV Land; CMT; MTV2
- Runtime: 92 minutes
- Viewership: 0.34 million (Nickelodeon network); 0.64 million (cable total); 3.1 million (total)
- Produced by: Sara Miller; Lauren Mandel
- Directed by: Ryan Polito

The 36th Annual Nickelodeon Kids' Choice Awards ceremony was held on March 4, 2023, at the Microsoft Theater in Los Angeles, California with Nate Burleson and Charli D'Amelio serving as hosts. It aired live on Nickelodeon and in a domestic simulcast with several other Paramount Global cable networks, and was broadcast live or tape delayed across all of Nickelodeon's international networks. Prior to the ceremony, a nominations special aired on Nickelodeon on March 2.

The ceremony had performances from Bebe Rexha, Young Dylan, and Lil Baby.

The Nickelodeon network premiere of Sing led into the ceremony, while a linear premiere of an episode of Big Nate served as the lead-out.

== Appearances ==
Prior to the ceremony, Pressley Hosbach, DangMattSmith, and Jane McManus hosted an Orange Carpet livestream on the Nickelodeon YouTube channel.

The ceremony featured appearances by celebrities including Awkwafina, Halle Bailey, Bianca Belair, Big E, Dove Cameron, Miranda Cosgrove, Pete Davidson, Dominique Fishback, Montez Ford, (Note: Kofi Kingston was originally slated to appear, but was replaced by Ford after Kingston suffered an injury.) Dwayne Johnson, Michael Le, Lil Uzi Vert, Peyton List, Becky Lynch, Melissa McCarthy, MrBeast, Jenna Ortega, Chris Pine, Bella Poarch, Anthony Ramos, Olivia Rodrigo, Michelle Rodriguez, Seth Rogen, Kelly Rowland, Adam Sandler, Lilly Singh, That Girl Lay Lay, Pierson Wodzynski, and Xavier Woods.

Presenters at the 2023 Kids' Choice Awards
Presenter(s)	Role
Kelly Rowland	Presented 'Favorite Male Creator'
Chris Pine Michelle Rodriguez	Preview of Dungeons & Dragons: Honor Among Thieves
Kira Kosarin Jack Griffo	Presented 'Favorite Male TV Star (Kids)'
Keegan-Michael Key	Presented 'Favorite Breakout Artist'
Lilly Singh Miranda Cosgrove	Presented 'Favorite Movie Actor'
Peyton List	Presented 'King of Comedy'; Introduced Adam Sandler
Awkwafina Halle Bailey Melissa McCarthy	Presented 'Favorite Social Music Star'
That Girl Lay Lay	Introduced Lil Baby
Anthony Ramos Dominique Fishback Pete Davidson	Presented 'Lifetime Achievement'; Introduced Optimus Prime
Landon Barker	Presented 'Favorite Female Creator'
Seth Rogen Brady Noon Micah Abbey Shamon Brown Jr. Nicolas Cantu	Preview of Teenage Mutant Ninja Turtles: Mutant Mayhem; Presented 'Favorite Female TV Star (Family)'

== Performers ==
Performers at the 2023 Kids' Choice Awards
Performer(s)	Song(s)
Charli D'Amelio Markell Washington Michael Le Nate Burleson Lil Uzi Vert	Dance medley "Bloody Mary" "Pretty Girls Walk" "Cuff It" "Rude Boy" "Just Wanna Rock"
Bebe Rexha	"I'm Good (Blue)"
Young Dylan	"I Just Wanna"
Lil Baby	"California Breeze"

== Winners and nominees ==
The nominees were announced and voting opened on January 31, 2023. Voting ended on March 4, 2023. The winners are listed first, highlighted in boldfaced text.

=== Movies ===
Favorite Movie	Favorite Movie Actor
**Sonic the Hedgehog 2**; Avatar: The Way of Water; Black Adam; Black Panther: Wakanda Forever; Hocus Pocus 2; Jurassic World Dominion; Monster High: The Movie; Top Gun: Maverick	**Dwayne Johnson** – Black Adam as Black Adam/Teth-Adam; Jim Carrey – Sonic the Hedgehog 2 as Dr. Robotnik; Chris Hemsworth – Thor: Love and Thunder as Thor; Chris Pratt – Jurassic World Dominion as Owen Grady; Ryan Reynolds – The Adam Project as Big Adam; Tom Cruise – Top Gun: Maverick as Capt. Pete "Maverick" Mitchell
Favorite Movie Actress	Favorite Animated Movie
**Millie Bobby Brown** – Enola Holmes 2 as Enola Holmes; Lupita Nyong'o – Black Panther: Wakanda Forever as Nakia; Elizabeth Olsen – Doctor Strange in the Multiverse of Madness as Wanda Maximoff/The Scarlet Witch; Sarah Jessica Parker – Hocus Pocus 2 as Sarah Sanderson; Natalie Portman – Thor: Love and Thunder as Jane Foster/The Mighty Thor; Letitia Wright – Black Panther: Wakanda Forever as Shuri	**Minions: The Rise of Gru**; DC League of Super-Pets; Hotel Transylvania: Transformania; Lightyear; The Bad Guys; Turning Red
Favorite Voice from an Animated Movie (Male)	Favorite Voice from an Animated Movie (Female)
**Dwayne Johnson** – DC League of Super-Pets as Krypto; Steve Carell – Minions: The Rise of Gru as Gru; Chris Evans – Lightyear as Buzz Lightyear; Kevin Hart – DC League of Super-Pets as Ace; Andy Samberg – Chip 'n Dale: Rescue Rangers as Dale; Andy Samberg – Hotel Transylvania: Transformania as Jonathan	**Selena Gomez** – Hotel Transylvania: Transformania as Mavis; Awkwafina – The Bad Guys as Tarantula; Salma Hayek – Puss in Boots: The Last Wish as Kitty Softpaws; Taraji P. Henson – Minions: The Rise of Gru as Belle Bottom; Sandra Oh – Turning Red as Ming; Keke Palmer – Lightyear as Izzy Hawthorne

=== Television ===
Favorite Kids TV Show	Favorite Male TV Star (Kids)
**The Fairly OddParents: Fairly Odder**; Are You Afraid of the Dark?; High School Musical: The Musical: The Series; Ms. Marvel; Raven's Home; That Girl Lay Lay; The Mighty Ducks: Game Changers; The Really Loud House	**Joshua Bassett** – High School Musical: The Musical: The Series as Ricky; Young Dylan – Tyler Perry's Young Dylan as Young Dylan; Israel Johnson – Bunk'd as Noah Lambert; Brady Noon – The Mighty Ducks: Game Changers as Evan Morrow; Wolfgang Schaeffer – The Really Loud House as Lincoln Loud; Tyler Wladis – The Fairly OddParents: Fairly Odder as Roy
Favorite Female TV Star (Kids)	Favorite Family TV Show
**Olivia Rodrigo** – High School Musical: The Musical: The Series as Nini; Imogen Cohen – The Fairly OddParents: Fairly Odder as Zina; Audrey Grace Marshall – The Fairly OddParents: Fairly Odder as Vivian Turner; Raven-Symoné – Raven's Home as Raven Baxter; That Girl Lay Lay – That Girl Lay Lay as Lay Lay; Sofia Wylie – High School Musical: The Musical: The Series as Gina	**Wednesday**; Cobra Kai; iCarly; Obi-Wan Kenobi; She-Hulk: Attorney at Law; Stranger Things; Young Rock; Young Sheldon
Favorite Male TV Star (Family)	Favorite Female TV Star (Family)
**Finn Wolfhard** – Stranger Things as Mike Wheeler; Ralph Macchio – Cobra Kai as Daniel LaRusso; Gaten Matarazzo – Stranger Things as Dustin Henderson; Ewan McGregor – Obi-Wan Kenobi as Obi-Wan Kenobi; Caleb McLaughlin – Stranger Things as Lucas Sinclair; Jerry Trainor – iCarly as Spencer Shay	**Jenna Ortega** – Wednesday as Wednesday Addams; Millie Bobby Brown – Stranger Things as Eleven; Miranda Cosgrove – iCarly as Carly Shay; Hilary Duff – How I Met Your Father as Sophie; Tracee Ellis Ross – Black-ish as Bow Johnson; Sadie Sink – Stranger Things as Max Mayfield
Favorite Reality Show	Favorite Animated Show
**MasterChef Junior**; America's Funniest Home Videos; America's Got Talent; American Ninja Warrior; Floor Is Lava; The Masked Singer	**SpongeBob SquarePants**; Jurassic World Camp Cretaceous; Rugrats; Teen Titans Go!; The Loud House; The Smurfs

=== Music ===
Favorite Music Group	Favorite Male Artist
**BTS**; 5 Seconds of Summer; Black Eyed Peas; Blackpink; Imagine Dragons; OneRepublic; Panic! at the Disco; Paramore	**Harry Styles**; Justin Bieber; Bad Bunny; Drake; Kendrick Lamar; Post Malone; Ed Sheeran; The Weeknd
Favorite Female Artist	Favorite Song
**Taylor Swift**; Adele; Cardi B; Beyoncé; Billie Eilish; Lady Gaga; Lizzo; Rihanna	**"As It Was"** – Harry Styles; "Break My Soul" – Beyoncé; "First Class" – Jack Harlow; "About Damn Time" – Lizzo; "I Ain't Worried" – OneRepublic; "Lift Me Up" – Rihanna; "Anti-Hero" – Taylor Swift; "Bejeweled" – Taylor Swift
Favorite Album	Favorite Breakout Artist
**Midnights (3am Edition)** – Taylor Swift; Renaissance – Beyoncé; God Did – DJ Khaled; Special – Lizzo; Harry's House – Harry Styles; Dawn FM – The Weeknd	**Dove Cameron**; Devon Cole; GAYLE; Joji; Lauren Spencer Smith; Nicky Youre
Favorite Music Collaboration	Favorite Social Music Star
**"Sweetest Pie"** – Megan Thee Stallion, Dua Lipa; "Bam Bam" – Camila Cabello featuring Ed Sheeran; "Don't You Worry" – Black Eyed Peas, David Guetta, Shakira; "I Like You (A Happier Song)" – Post Malone featuring Doja Cat; "Numb" – Marshmello featuring Khalid; "Stay with Me" – Calvin Harris featuring Justin Timberlake, Halsey, Pharrell	**Bella Poarch**; Dixie D'Amelio; Stephen Sanchez; JoJo Siwa; That Girl Lay Lay; Oliver Tree
Favorite Global Music Star
**Harry Styles** (UK); Bad Bunny (Latin America); Blackpink (Asia); Rosalía (Europe); Taylor Swift (North America); Tones and I (Australia); Wizkid (Africa)

=== Sports ===
Favorite Male Sports Star	Favorite Female Sports Star
**LeBron James**; Tom Brady; Stephen Curry; Patrick Mahomes; Lionel Messi; Shaun White	**Serena Williams**; Simone Biles; Chloe Kim; Naomi Osaka; Candace Parker; Venus Williams

=== Miscellaneous ===
Favorite Male Creator	Favorite Female Creator
**MrBeast**; Austin Creed; Ninja; Ryan's World; SeanDoesMagic; Unspeakable	**Charli D'Amelio**; Dixie D'Amelio; Gracie's Corner; Kids Diana Show; Miranda Sings; Addison Rae
Favorite Social Media Family	Favorite Celebrity Pet
**Ninja Kidz TV**; FGTeeV; Ohana Adventure Family; The Bucket List Family; The Royalty Family; The Williams Family	**Olivia Benson Swift**; Piggy Lou Bieber; Noon Coleman; Dodger Evans; Toulouse Grande; Gino Chopra Jonas
Favorite Video Game	Favorite Book
**Minecraft**; Adopt Me!; Brookhaven; Just Dance 2023; Mario + Rabbids Sparks of Hope; Pokémon Scarlet and Violet	**Harry Potter book series**; Captain Underpants book series; Cat Kid Comic Club book series; Diary of a Wimpy Kid book series; Five Nights at Freddy's book series; The Bad Guys book series

== Special Recognitions ==
=== Lifetime Achievement ===
- Optimus Prime

=== King of Comedy ===
- Adam Sandler

== International ==
The following are nominations for awards to be given by Nickelodeon's international networks.

Favorite Kidfluencer (Africa)	Favorite Star (Africa)
Lethukuthula Bhengu; Alakhe Mdoda; Rethabile Mokgatla; Olianna and Olivia; Siba Bogopa; DJ Arch JNR	Trevor Noah; Msaki; Scorpion Kings; Banyana Banyana
Favorite Creator (Asia)	Aussie/Kiwi Legend of the Year
Aqil Zulkiflee; Gen Halilintar; Hikakin; Niana Guerrero	Savannah Clarke; Lydia Ko; Nick News; Budjerah; Georgie Stone; Robert Irwin
Favorite Star (Belgium)	Favorite Family (Netherlands)
Romelu Lukaku; Steffi Mercie; Pommelien Thijs; Metejoor	The Bellinga family; The Kluivert family; The Rutjes family; The Zeeuw-Spronk family
Favorite Star (Netherlands)	Brazilian Artist
Stefania; Snelle (Lars Bos); Broederliefde; Meisje Djamilla	Any Gabrielly; Jão; Gustavo Mioto; Lagum; Dilsinho; Melim
Brazilian Influencer	Favorite Influencer (Estonia)
Allan Jeon; Juju Franco; Luluca; Diego Cruz; Vanessa Lopes; Spider Slack	Liina Ariadne Pedanik; Laura Rannaväli; Marie Liset Tauts; Bärbel Moros
Favorite Singer (Germany, Austria & Switzerland)	Favorite Social Media Star (Germany, Austria & Switzerland)
Lena; Leony; Mark Forster; Nico Santos; Tim Bendzko; Zoe Wees	Julia Beautx; ItsLukasWhite (Lukas Leonhardt); Julesboringlife (Jule Nagel); Karim Jamal; Klaudia Giez; Twenty4tim (Tim Kampmann)
Favorite Social Media Newcomer (Germany, Austria & Switzerland)	Favorite Earworm (Germany, Austria & Switzerland)
Jessie Bluegrey; Alles Ava; Helge Mark; itsofficialmarco (Marco Strecker); Maria Ziffy; Nadine Breaty	"Remedy" – Leony; "Eigentlich" – LEA; "Hausaufgaben" – Deine Freunde; "Life Is a Beach" – Lena
Favorite Crew (Germany, Austria & Switzerland)	Favorite Star (Hungary)
Elevator Boys; Germany women's national football team; The School of the Magical Animals cast; Provinz; Spotlight cast	WhisperTon (Antal Strenner); Dominik Szoboszlai; ValMar; Forstner Csenge
Favorite Social Star (Italy)	Social Star of the Year (Italy)
Aurora Baruto; Gabriele Vagnato; Emily Pallini; Martina Strazzer; Patrizio Morellato; Sespo	Luca Campolunghi; Pamela Paolini; Samara Tramontana; Florin Vitan; Pietro Morello; Nicky Passarella
Favorite Singer (Italy)	Favorite Influencer (Kazakhstan)
Alex; Ariete; Pinguini Tattici Nucleari; Tananai; Mara Sattei; Alfa	Amina Malgazhdar; Alina Kim; Zhasmin Saideldinova; Batyr White
Favorite Influencer (Latin America)	Favorite Artist (Latin America)
SKabeche (Bryan & Eddy SKabeche); Soy Carlitos; Robegrill (Roberto Morales); Sol Carlos; Brianda Deyanara; Ignacia Antonia	Kenia Os; Sebastián Yatra; Manuel Turizo; Camilo; Danna Paola; Anitta
Favorite Influencer (Latvia)	Favorite Opinion Maker (Lithuania)
Lauris Zalāns; Adriana Miglāne Sondore; Elīna Pakalne; Kristaps Graufelds	Ignas Lelys; Cukrinis Avinėlis; Amanda Puškytė; Demi Norvilaitė
Favorite Star (Arabia)	Favorite Star (Poland)
Amro Maskoun; Osama Marwah; Raghda Kouyoumdjian; Rozzah	sanah; Sara James; Małe TGD; Roxie Węgiel; Kuba Szmajkowski
Favorite Influencer (Poland)	Favorite Internet Star (Portugal)
Kacper JASPER Essa; Maria Jeleniewska; Natalia Skroczek; Margarita Ishchenko; Damian Tkaczuk	Inês Teixiera; Mafalda Creative; Gustavo Ribeiro; Rita Laranjeira
Most Beloved Star (Romania)	Favorite Artist (Spain)
Andra Gogan; Alina Eremia; Smiley; The Melimi family	Adexe & Nau; Carlos Higes; Luna Fulgencio; Laia Oli
Favorite Influencer (Spain)
Indy; Alicia Martínez; Laura Rouder; Rubén George
