= Therapy (Zoe Wees album) =

Studio album by Zoe Wees
- Released: 3 November 2023
- Genre: Pop; R&B
- Length: 59:38
- Label: Valeria, Capitol

Zoe Wees chronology
Golden Wings (2021)	Therapy (2023)

Singles from Therapy
- 1. "That's How It Goes" Released: November 2021; 2. "Third Wheel" Released: 8 July 2022; 3. "Daddy's Eyes" Released: 23 September 2022; 4. "Don't Give Up" Released: 14 April 2023; 5. "Lightning" Released: 18 August 2023; 6. "Sorry for the Drama" Released: 6 October 2023

Therapy is the debut studio album by German singer Zoe Wees. It was announced in August 2023 released on 3 November 2023. About the album, Wees said, "This album is for everyone who is struggling with depression, anxiety, and breakups. But I also wrote this album for myself and it helped me grow a lot. The oldest song is 4 years old and looking back it's really inspiring to me cause I've been growing so much, I'm very proud of myself."

The EP includes three songs from Wees' debut extended play Golden Wings; "Control", "Girls Like Us" and "Hold Me Like You Used To". It reached number fifteen in Germany and charted in Switzerland and Austria.

== Critical reception ==
Professional ratings
Review scores
Source	Rating
Rolling Stone Germany	3/5 stars

Sabrina Shahryar from Crucial Rhythm said "Zoe has an incredibly unique voice and has a way of expressing herself through her heartfelt lyrics. The rhythm of each song is matched perfectly with the lyrics. This album is worth the wait and fans will love it."

Ralf Niemczyk from Rolling Stone Germany said the album "contains cleverly produced soul-pop-R&B" song and "her songs are reminiscent of Billie Eilish".

Vincent Lane from The Garnette Report said "The record... is a full-on, heart-and-soul account of Zoe who is armed with nothing but honesty as she re-tells life growing up with anxiety, health conditions, growing up in a single-parent home, and later dealing with everything the music industry and social media has to throw at her."

Mo Pop said "Wees impresses with Therapy with its deep lyrics and her powerful voice. It invites listeners on an emotional journey and encourages them to think about themselves and their own lives."

Yannik Gölz from laut.de said "Zoe has talent, volume, strength, expression, she is in a sense the complete package. Nevertheless, their debut Therapy is one of the most boring albums of the year."

== Track listing ==
Therapy track listing
No.	Title	Writer(s)	Producer(s)	Length
1.	"Sorry for the Drama"	Zoe Wees; Paul Goller; Hight; Ricardo Muñoz; Patrick Salmy; Keven Wolfshon	Ricardo Muñoz; Patrick Salmy	3:11
2.	"Lightning"	Wees; Hailey Collier; Hampus Lindvall; Leon Milla; Muñoz; Akuda Garestad Peck; Salmy	Leon Milla; Muñoz; Salmy	2:57
3.	"Girls Like Us"	Wees; Hight; Muñoz; Nicolas Rebscher; Salmy	Muñoz; Nicolas Rebscher; Salmy	3:09
4.	"Love Should Be Easy"	Wees; Luz Corrigan; Milla; Muñoz; Alex O’Shaunghnessy; Salmy	Milla; Muñoz Salmy	3:22
5.	"Control"	Wees; Nils Bodenstedt; Muñoz; René Müller; Emma Sophia Rosen; Salmy	Muñoz; Salmy	3:50
6.	"Lifeline"	Wees; Corrigan; Muñoz; O'Shaunghnessy; Salmy	Milla; Muñoz; Salmy	2:40
7.	"Daddy’s Eyes"	Wees; Hight; Muñoz; Rebscher; Salmy	Milla; Muñoz; Rebscher; Salmy	3:02
8.	"Hold Me"	Wees; Tom Hengelbrock; Simon Klose; MIlla	Milla; Muñoz; Salmy	2:28
9.	"Nothing’s Forever"	Wees; Corrigan; Milla; Muñoz; O’Shaunghnessy; Salmy	Milla; Muñoz; Salmy	3:18
10.	"21 Candles"	Wees; Blvsh; Michael Burek; Jaro; Milla	Michael Burek; Milla; Muñoz; Salmy	2:44
11.	"On My Own"	Wees; Bodenstedt; Milla; Muñoz; Rosen; Salmy	Milla; Muñoz; Salmy	3:18
12.	"Broke"	Wees; Muñoz; Mike Needle; Salmy	Muñoz; Salmy	3:30
13.	"That's How It Goes" (featuring 6lack)	Wees; 6lack; Hight; Muñoz; Rebscher; Salmy	Muñoz; Rebscher; Salmy	2:42
14.	"You Ain't Really Good for Me"	Wees; Georgia Ku; Muñoz; Rebscher; Salmy	Muñoz; Salmy	2:21
15.	"Don't Give Up"	Wees; Norma Jean Martine; Muñoz; Salmy	Milla; Muñoz; Salmy	2:46
16.	"Nothing But You"	Wees; Hight; Muñoz; Rebescher; Salmy	Muñoz; Salmy	2:27
17.	"Third Wheel"	Wees; Hight; Muñoz; Salmy	Muñoz; Salmy	2:46
18.	"Less of a Woman"	Wees; Blvsh; Burek; Jaro; Milla	Burek; Milla; Muñoz; Salmy	2:34
19.	"Hold Me Like You Used To"	Wees; Bodenstedt; Muñoz; Müller; Rosen; Salmy	Muñoz; Salmy	3:06
20.	"When It Hurts"	Wees; Hight; Muñoz; Salmy	Muñoz; Salmy	3:15
Total length:				59:38

== Charts ==
Chart performance for Therapy
Chart (2023)	Peak position
Austrian Albums (Ö3 Austria)	43
German Albums (Offizielle Top 100)	15
Swiss Albums (Schweizer Hitparade)	12
UK Album Downloads (OCC)	90
