= Balfanz =

Balfanz may refer to:

- German name for Białowąs, a village in northwestern Poland, part of Germany before 1945
- Alex Balfanz (born 1999), American video game developer
- John Balfanz (1940–1991), American ski jumper
