= René Miller =

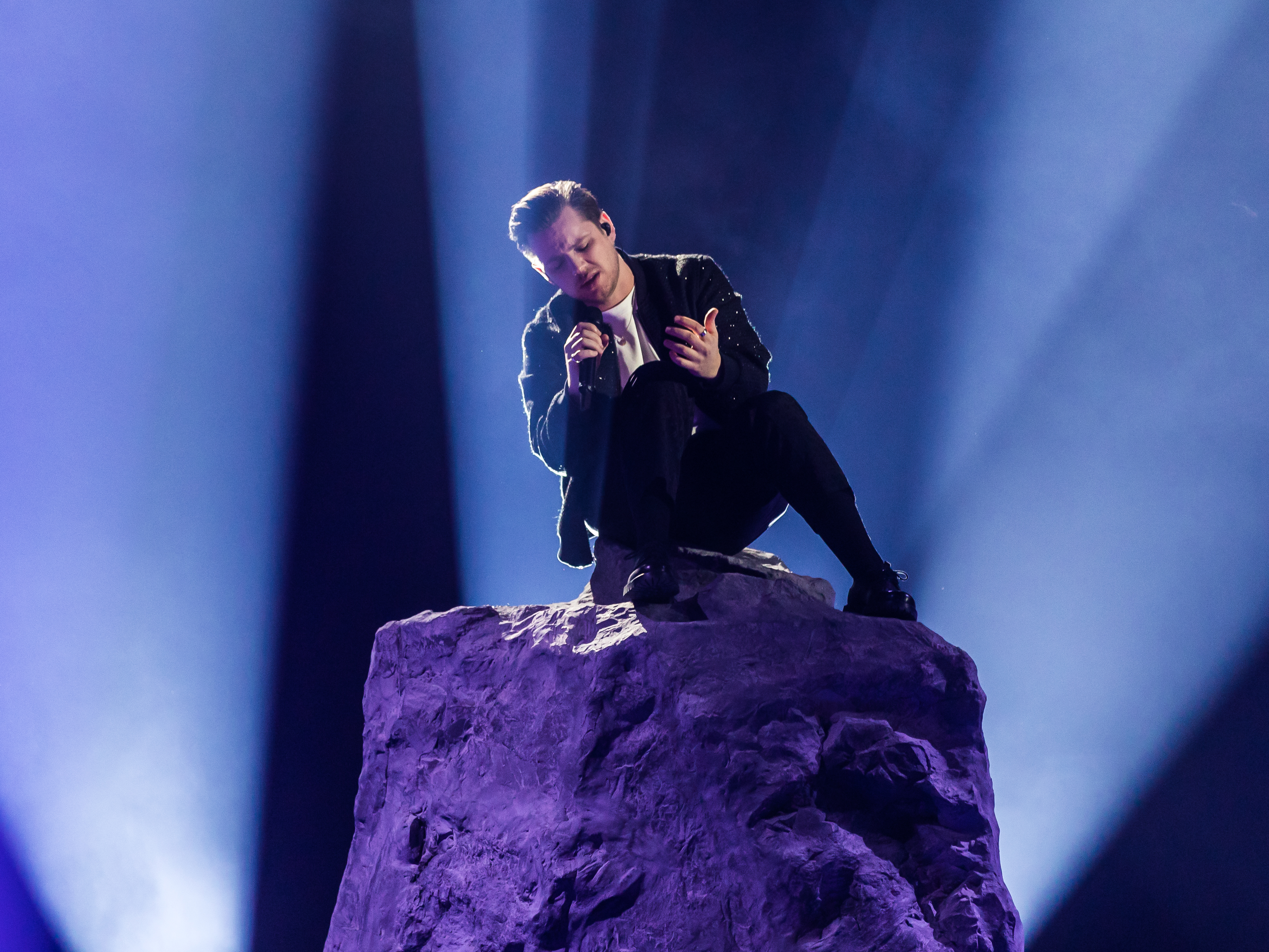
- Miller performing at Unser Lied für Liverpool in 2023.

Background information
- Born: 1996; Filderstadt, Germany
- Genre: Pop
- Occupations: Artist, songwriter
- Years active: 2014–present

YouTube information
- Genre: Music
- Subscribers: 23.5 thousand
- Views: 4.16 million
- Last updated: 13 August 2024

René Miller is a German artist, multi-instrumentalist, and songwriter. He has co-written songs for artists such as Zoe Wees, Topic, A7S, Mike Perry, and Jack Curley.

In 2018, he was a recipient of the German Songwriting Award. In 2019, he signed a worldwide publishing deal with Sony/ATV Germany.

Notable songs written by Miller include "Control" by Zoe Wees & "Breaking Me" by Topic & A7S. "Control" charted in several nations including number 1 in France (SNEP Radio), and has achieved Platinum certification.

He is a close collaborator of Zoe Wees.

In 2023, Miller participated in Unser Lied für Liverpool, the German national selection for Eurovision Song Contest 2023 with the song "Concrete Heart". He finished 7th in the final, placing 3rd with the international juries.

== Discography ==
=== Singles ===
Title	Year	Album or EP
"You Are"	2018	Non-album singles
"Favorite Stranger" (with Scene Writers and Luca Schreiner)	2019	Non-album singles
"Make Up Your Mind"	2019	Non-album singles
"Sorry for Being Late"	2019	Non-album singles
"Remind Me to Forget"	2019	Non-album singles
"All for You" (with Pyke & Muñoz)	2020	Non-album singles
"Silence"	2020	Non-album singles
"Gets Me the Most" (with Pyke & Muñoz)	2020	Non-album singles
"Forget to Forget You"	2020	Non-album singles
"Silence"	2020	Non-album singles
"Standing in His Shoes"	2022	Non-album singles
"Out of Goodbyes"	2022	Non-album singles
"Concrete Heart"	2022	Non-album singles
"Wrong Places"	2023	Non-album singles
"Crystal Eyes"	2025	Non-album singles

=== As featured artist ===
Title	Year	Peak chart positions				Certifications	Album or EP
Title	Year	GER	AUT	CZE Air.	SVK Air.	Certifications	Album or EP
"Lighthouse" (Mike Perry and Hot Shade featuring René Miller)	2019	—	—	—	—		Non-album singles
"Keep on Loving" (Topic featuring René Miller)	2019	—	—	—	—		Non-album singles
"Fine Without You" (Neptunica featuring René Miller)	2020	—	—	—	—		Non-album singles
"Around the World" (Niklas Dee featuring René Miller)	2024	41	68	—	—	IFPI AUT: Platinum	Around the World; Remix EP
"C'est la vie" (Niklas Dee featuring René Miller)	2024	—	—	—	—		Non-album singles
"Crazy Crazy" (Niklas Dee featuring René Miller)	2025	—	—	—	—		Non-album singles
"Body Talk" (Alle Farben featuring René Miller)	2026	—	—	39	53		Disco EP
"—" denotes a recording that did not chart or was not released in that territory.

=== Songwriting credits ===
As per Tidal credits

Year	Artist	Song	Role
2026	Tom Grennan	Wrapped In Gold	Songwriter
2026	Martin Tungevaag & Thandi	Rare	Songwriter
2026	Thorsteinn Einarsson	Bonfire	Songwriter
2026	Moss Kena	Worshipping The Sun	Songwriter
2026	Paula Stellar	Girl My Age	Songwriter
2026	David Puentez & Loi	Golden Summer	Songwriter
2026	Cascada	YOUtopia	Songwriter
2026	Jack Dean	Mercy	Songwriter
2026	Hypaton ft. Izzy Bizu	Slide	Songwriter
2026	Paula Stellar	LOVESICK	Songwriter, Producer
2026	Riize	All Of You	Songwriter
2026	Pedro Santos	I Don't Know Me	Songwriter
2025	Loi	Red Eyes	Songwriter
2025	Niklas Dee & Rene Miller	Crazy Crazy	Songwriter, Artist
2025	Niklas Dee & Rene Miller	C'est La Vie	Songwriter, Artist
2025	Chris de Sarandy	Hurts Like This	Songwriter
2025	ISAAK	PAPER PLANE	Songwriter
2025	Jack Dean	Tears Won't Save You	Songwriter
2025	Dean Lewis & Zoe Wees	Learn To Love	Songwriter
2025	Alle Farben & Majestic	From Disco To Disco	Songwriter
2025	Nico Santos	Home Pt. 2	Songwriter
2025	Loi	Get Lucky	Songwriter
2025	Jack Dean	Church In The Morning	Songwriter
2025	Thorsteinn Einarsson	Oh Love	Songwriter
2025	Medun ft René Miller	Crystal Eyes	Songwriter, Artist
2024	Sara James	Salty	Songwriter
2024	Sara James	Tiny Heart	Songwriter
2024	Loi	Left In Your Love	Songwriter, Producer
2024	Marcus & Martinus, Vize	Another Life	Songwriter
2024	Cheat Codes, YouNotUs, Barbz	Cinema	Songwriter
2024	ClockClock	Pretty Eyes	Songwriter
2024	Niklas Dee & René Miller	Around The World	Songwriter, Artist
2024	Switch Disco, Charlotte Hanning, Felix	I Found You	Songwriter
2024	Elevator Boys	Insecure	Songwriter
2024	Loi	The Way I Want It	Songwriter
2024	Frank Walker ft. Stephen Puth	Waiting	Songwriter
2024	Tujamo, Medun	Heaven Is A Place	Songwriter
2023	Loi	Am I Enough	Songwriter
2023	Zoe Wees	On My Own	Songwriter
2023	Rita Ora	Waiting for You	Songwriter
2023	Loi	News	Songwriter
2023	Nico Santos	City Nights	Songwriter
2023	Lumix, Lawrent	Electric Love	Songwriter
2023	René Miller	Wrong Places	Artist, Songwriter
2023	Ruben	Easier	Songwriter
2022	Michael Patrick Kelly	Good Morning Sunshine	Songwriter
2022	Tom Gregory	Forget Somebody	Songwriter
2022	René Miller	Concrete Heart	Artist, Songwriter
2022	Deepend, Madism	Hold This Memory	Songwriter
2022	Loi	Gold	Songwriter
2022	Martin Jensen	Pages	Songwriter
2022	Jovani, Chris Crone, NOTSOBAD	Running Heart	Songwriter
2022	René Miller	Out Of Goodbyes	Artist, Songwriter
2022	René Miller	Standing In His Shoes	Artist, Songwriter
2022	Timmy Trumpet	Just In Case	Songwriter
2021	Alok & Steve Aoki feat. Lars Martin	Typical	Songwriter
2021	Super Junior-D&E	Have A Nice Day	Songwriter
2021	Lucas Estrada	In The Night	Songwriter
2021	Camylio	Unbreak	Songwriter
2021	Camylio	Black and White	Songwriter
2021	MNI, Jordan Shaw	Eyes	Songwriter
2021	Nico Suave, Emy	Camouuflage	Songwriter
2021	Zoe Wees	Hold Me Like You Used	Songwriter
2021	Twocolors	Bloodstream	Songwriter
2021	Twocolors	Not Yours - TC/TC	Songwriter
2021	Tujamo	I Don't Wanna Go	Songwriter
2021	Nico Suave & Johannes Oerding	Gedankenmillionäre	Songwriter
2020	Zoe Wees	Control	Songwriter
2020	Jack Curley	Down	Songwriter
2020	René Miller	Gets Me The Most	Artist, Songwriter
2020	Kriminell	EstA	Songwriter
2020	Juze	Three Words	Songwriter
2020	Pyke & Munoz, René Miller	All For You	Artist, Songwriter
2020	René Miller	Forget To Forget You	Artist, Songwriter
2020	René Miller	Silence	Artist, Songwriter
2020	Neptunica, René Miller	Fine Without You	Artist, Songwriter
2019	Topic, A7S	Breaking Me	Songwriter
2019	Mike Perry, Hot Shade, René Miller	Lighthouse	Artist, Songwriter
2019	Mike Perry	Runaway	Vocalist, Songwriter
2019	Topic, René Miller	Keep On Loving	Artist, Songwriter
2019	René Miller	Forget To Forget You	Artist, Songwriter
2019	René Miller	Make Up Your Mind	Artist, Songwriter
2019	René Miller, Scene Writers, Luca Schreiner	Favourite Stranger	Artist, Songwriter
2019	René Miller	Sorry For Being Late	Artist, Songwriter
2019	SINA ANASTASIA	Du Bist	Songwriter
2019	Vida Noa	Self Love Club	Songwriter
2018	René Miller	You Are (Acoustic Version)	Artist, Songwriter
2018	Juno Im Park, Charlie Lineman	Free	Songwriter
