= The Fairly OddParents: Fairly Odder =

American live-action/animated comedy television series

- Genre: Comedy; Fantasy; Sitcom
- Based on: Characters from the series created by Butch Hartman
- Developed by: Christopher J. Nowak
- Showrunner: Christopher J. Nowak
- Starring: Audrey Grace Marshall; Tyler Wladis; Ryan-James Hatanaka; Laura Bell Bundy; Imogen Cohen
- Voices of: Susanne Blakeslee; Daran Norris
- Theme music composer: Butch Hartman; Ron Jones
- Composers: Zack Hexum & Niki Hexum
- Country of origin: United States
- Original language: English
- No. of seasons: 1
- No. of episodes: 13

Production
- Executive producers: Christopher J. Nowak; Mike Caron; Butch Hartman; Fred Seibert; Samantha Martin
- Producers: Andrew Hirsch; Sam Becker; Shari Tavey
- Cinematography: Michael Spodnik
- Editors: Philip Mangano; Michael Karlich
- Running time: 24–25 minutes
- Production companies: Billionfold Inc.; Nickelodeon Productions

Original release
- Network: Paramount+
- Release: March 31, 2022

Related
- The Fairly OddParents; The Fairly OddParents: A New Wish

The Fairly OddParents: Fairly Odder is an American live-action animated comedy television series developed by Christopher J. Nowak that premiered on Paramount+ on March 31, 2022. It is a sequel and spin-off of Nickelodeon's original animated series The Fairly OddParents.

Critics, viewers, and fans of the original series near-universally panned the series for its weak writing, lack of humor, and deviations from its predecessor.

== Premise ==
Picking up years after the original animated series, the new series follows Timmy Turner's cousin, Vivian "Viv" Turner, and her new stepbrother, Roy Raskin, as they navigate life in Dimmsdale with the help of their fairy godparents, Cosmo and Wanda, who are given to them by a now-adult Timmy when he leaves for college.

== Cast ==
=== Live-action cast ===
- Audrey Grace Marshall as Vivian "Viv" Turner, a newcomer to Dimmsdale to move in with her new family, who after inheriting the fairies Cosmo and Wanda from her cousin Timmy, must share the wishes with her stepbrother Roy
- Tyler Wladis as Roy Raskin, Viv's stepbrother, and a local star in Dimmsdale on the school basketball team, who shares the wishes of the fairies Cosmo and Wanda with Viv whom he quickly grows fond of
- Ryan-James Hatanaka as Ty Turner, Viv's father and Roy's stepfather, who works as a semi-professional dancer
- Laura Bell Bundy as Rachel Raskin, Roy's mother and Viv's stepmother, who works as a ballroom dancer
- Imogen Cohen as Zina Zacarias, Viv's best friend who has a crush on Roy

=== Voice cast ===
- Susanne Blakeslee as Wanda, one of Viv and Roy's two fairy godparents, and the wife of Cosmo. Blakeslee reprises her role from the original animated series and films.
- Daran Norris as Cosmo, the other of Viv and Roy's fairy godparents, and Wanda's husband; and Jorgen Von Strangle, the strict leader of the fairies. Norris reprises his roles from the original animated series and films.

=== Guest stars ===
- Garrett Clayton as Dustan Lumberlake, a famous pop music star. He is based on real-life singer Justin Timberlake.
- Mary Kate Wiles as Vicky, an evil teacher at Dimmsdale Junior High, and Timmy Turner's former babysitter. Unlike in the original animated series, Vicky now believes in fairies and is in love with Denzel Crocker.
- Carlos Alazraqui as Denzel Crocker, a retired former teacher at Dimmsdale Junior High who is obsessed with fairies. Alazraqui reprises his role from the original animated series in live-action and animation.
- Caleb Pierce as Timmy Turner, the main protagonist of the original Fairly OddParents animated series and Viv's cousin, who he gives his fairies Cosmo and Wanda to before leaving for college

== Episodes ==
No.	Title	Directed by	Written by	Original release date	Nickelodeon air date	Prod. code	U.S. linear viewers (millions)
1	"Cake, Dance, & Solid Gold Pants"	Mike Caron	Christopher J. Nowak	March 31, 2022	April 21, 2022	101	0.20
2	"The Forbidden Phrase"	Evelyn Belasco	Samantha Martin	March 31, 2022	November 3, 2022	103	0.15
3	"King Roydas"	Adam Weissman	Christopher J. Nowak	March 31, 2022	November 17, 2022	105	0.13
4	"Vicky's Best Friend"	Adam Weissman	Angela Yarbrough	March 31, 2022	November 10, 2022	104	0.15
5	"Cheater Cheater Cookie Eater"	Adam Weissman	Mariah Smith	March 31, 2022	November 24, 2022	106	0.16
6	"The Most Popular Person"	Evelyn Belasco	Sam Becker	March 31, 2022	October 10, 2022	102	0.14
7	"The Show Off"	Adam Weissman	Jenna Martin	March 31, 2022	December 8, 2022	108	0.16
8	"Back to the Scooter"	Adam Weissman	Samantha Martin	March 31, 2022	January 5, 2023	109	0.13
9	"Codzillard!"	Evelyn Belasco	Sam Becker	March 31, 2022	January 12, 2023	110	0.13
10	"Roynocchio"	Leonard R. Garner Jr.	Angela Yarbrough	March 31, 2022	January 19, 2023	111	0.17
11	"Da Wish App"	Elvira Ibragimova	Nick Dossman	March 31, 2022	December 1, 2022	107	0.12
12	"Fairies Away!"	Leonard R. Garner Jr.	Samantha Martin	March 31, 2022	January 26, 2023	112	0.16
13	"Fairies Away!"	Mike Caron	Sam Becker	March 31, 2022	February 2, 2023	113	N/A

== Production ==
The series was announced in February 2021, with Butch Hartman and Fred Seibert returning as producers, and Christopher J. Nowak serving as both executive producer and showrunner. The series started production in July 2021. The animation was outsourced to the Tijuana-based Boxel Studio. All 13 episodes were released on Paramount+ on March 31, 2022. In January 2023, the series was removed from Paramount+.

== Reception ==
=== Critical response ===
The show received a mixed to negative reception from critics, especially for its weak writing and humor, and was compared to Saturday Night Live sketches. Fans of the original series widely panned it for "taking away the kookiness" that defined the original show. However, Diondra Brown from Common Sense Media gave the series three-out-of-five stars, calling it "a family-friendly show with eccentric comedy and a meaningful nod to the original comedy series."

=== Awards and nominations ===
Year	Award	Category	Nominee(s)	Result	Refs
2022	Children's and Family Emmy Awards	Outstanding Choreography	Cynthia Nowak	Nominated	
2022	Children's and Family Emmy Awards	Outstanding Stunt Coordination for a Live Action Program	Brian Williams	Nominated	
2022	Children's and Family Emmy Awards	Outstanding Makeup and Hairstyling	various	Nominated	
2023	Kids' Choice Awards	Favorite Kids TV Show	The Fairly OddParents: Fairly Odder	Won	

== See also ==
- List of television shows notable for negative reception
