= Adaeze Onuigbo =

Nigerian actress, model and dancer (born 2005)

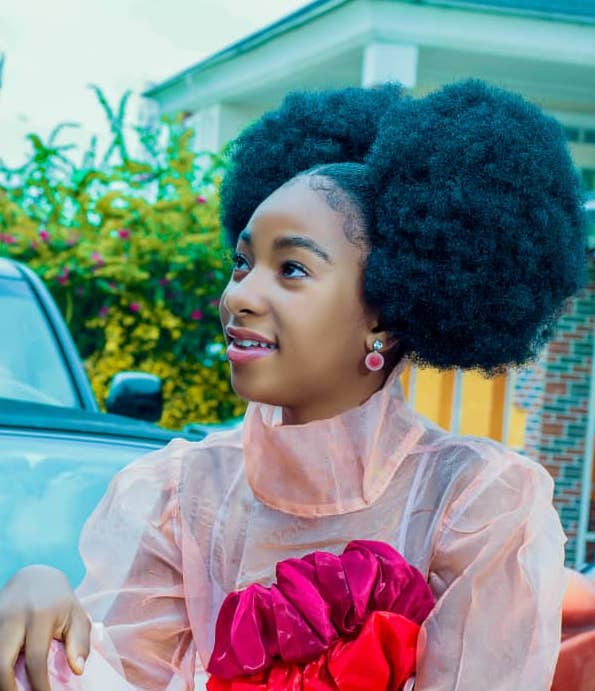
- Born: 2 September 2005 (age 21); Asaba, Delta State, Nigeria
- Occupations: Actress, dancer and model

Adaeze Angel Onuigbo (born 2 September 2005), professionally known as Adaeze Onuigbo, is a Nigerian actress, dancer and model who is known for her roles in Nollywood films.

== Biography ==
Onuigbo was born on 2 September 2005 in Asaba, Delta State, Nigeria. Her mother was also an actress.

Onuigbo began her career as a child actress, with roles in traditional village-centered stories. She has starred in films including Emotional Baby, The Heiress, Laurie, The New Girl In My Class, Omambala, Sisters Love, The Stolen Crown, Strained and Tears of Ojiugo. In 2010, she won the SRTV Media Award for Most Famous Kid Actor.

In 2022, she was nominated for the Favorite Kidfluencer (Africa) award at Nickelodeon's 2022 Kids' Choice Awards.
