= Golden Wings =

EP by Zoe Wees
- Released: 21 May 2021
- Length: 16:01
- Label: Valeria, Capitol

Zoe Wees chronology
Golden Wings (2021)	Therapy (2023)

Singles from Golden Wings
- 1. "Control" Released: 13 March 2020; 2. "Girls Like Us" Released: 12 January 2021; 3. "Ghost" Released: 16 April 2021; 4. "Hold Me Like You Used To" Released: 28 May 2021

Golden Wings is the debut extended play by German singer Zoe Wees. It was released on 21 May 2021.

== Critical reception ==
Christopher Filipecki from Minute Musik said "Golden Wings comprises almost 16 minutes and five tracks, which never sound as if they come from Germany. Instead, the powerful, soulful alto voice puts so much emotion and expression into the vocals that that alone is quite captivating and provides pleasant shivers. But before the whole world is turned upside down, The EP is quite good, but nothing more."

== Track listing ==
Golden Wings track listing
No.	Title	Writer(s)	Producer(s)	Length
1.	"Control"	Zoe Wees; Nils Bodenstedt; Ricardo Muñoz; René Müller; Emma Rosen; Patrick Salmy	Ricardo Muñoz; Patrick Salmy	3:50
2.	"Girls Like Us"	Wees; Hight; Muñoz; Nicolas Rebscher; Salmy	Muñoz; Nicolas Rebscher; Salmy	3:09
3.	"Hold Me Like You Used To"	Wees; Bodenstedt; Muñoz; Müller; Rosen; Salmy	Muñoz; Salmy	3:06
4.	"Ghost"	Wees; Muñoz; Nicolas Rebscher; Rosen; Salmy	Muñoz; Salmy	2:51
5.	"Over Thinking"	Wees; Molly Irvine; Muñoz; Rebscher; Salmy	Muñoz; Salmy	3:01
Total length:				16:01

== Charts ==
Chart performance for Golden WIngs
Chart (2021)	Peak position
German Albums (Offizielle Top 100)	31
Swiss Albums (Schweizer Hitparade)	28
