= Dress to Impress =

2023 Roblox video game

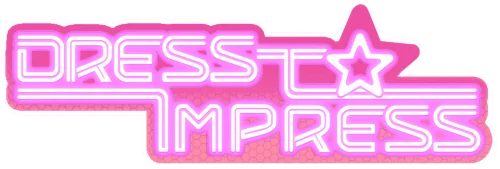
- Developer: Dress To Impress Group
- Director: Gigi
- Engine: Roblox Studio
- Platforms: Various: Windows; macOS; iOS; Android; Xbox One; Meta Quest 2; Meta Quest Pro; PlayStation 4; PlayStation 5
- Release: November 11, 2023; 3 years ago
- Genre: Dress-up
- Mode: Multiplayer

Dress to Impress (colloquially abbreviated as DTI) is a multiplayer dress-up video game created by the Dress To Impress Group, led by the developer Gigi, and officially released on November 11, 2023, on the online game platform Roblox. In it, players are given around five minutes to put together outfits for their avatar based on a theme, which are then ranked by other players before the three with the most votes are revealed.

By July 2024, the game had become a viral online phenomenon and received significant praise from video game critics, with its popularity extending to players outside the platform. This was partly attributed to popular video game livestreamers and promotional collaborations such as Charli XCX's 2024 album Brat.

== Gameplay ==
Players in Dress to Impress display their outfits based on a given theme, such as "Carnival", on a runway while other players rank them from one to five stars. Players can also compete as a pair in "duos". (Pictured in 2023)

In Dress to Impress, players compete in an online lobby where they are presented with a theme and given 360 seconds to assemble an outfit that fits the prompt. Players can select up to 18 articles of clothing from a large in-game showroom and customize their model's appearance, including makeup, skin tone, and nail color. The colors of accessories and clothing can also be modified. When the timer expires, players showcase their outfits by walking down a catwalk, where other participants rate each look on a one to five star scale.

Players also have the option to compete as a duo, presenting their outfits alongside a partner. Players are subsequently ranked based on the total number of stars received, with the top three participants featured on a podium at the conclusion of the round. Players also have personal ranks based on their performance in rounds. Achieving higher ranks unlocks additional items. Additionally, a freeplay mode is available, allowing players to style outfits without time constraints or competition.

Certain updates introduce limited-time events, where completing specific quests rewards players with exclusive items. Beginning with the Halloween 2024 update, these events have taken the form of story-driven quests centered around Lana, the game's nail technician, and feature fantastical themes, including elements inspired by Greek mythology.

Clothing from the game takes inspiration from several real-life fashion styles such as boho-chic, preppy, Lolita, Harajuku, and streetwear. The game's themes also include fashion styles, Internet aesthetics, and topics like "back to school," "maximalist/minimalist," "costume party," "mall goth," "Y2K," "formal," and "album cover". Players can also unlock additional items in the game by buying them with in-game dollars, Robux, or by entering limited time codes.

== Development ==
Dress to Impress was developed by a Roblox player known mononymously as Gigi, who has stated that she began developing the game at 14 years old and was 17 years old in 2024. The game's story, including a backstory for the game's nail technician, Lana, is largely written by a player named M0t0Princess. It was officially released on Roblox on November 11, 2023. It soon became one of the fastest games, or "experiences", to reach one billion visits on the platform.

In early August 2024, players could collect "Shines", collectible items that were part of Roblox's "The Games" event, within Dress to Impress. Later that month, it was announced on the Dress to Impress Twitter account that a collaboration with Charli XCX, which would add in-game items, emotes, and patterns based on her 2024 album Brat, would begin that month. The update also added eight new themes, such as "Club Classics," "Mean Girls," "Y2K," "Brat," "Rotten to the Core," and "Partygirl," alongside theme voting every four rounds, a mechanic that was later scrapped. The collaboration led to the game having over 651 thousand concurrent players soon after its release, its highest amount as of 2024.

In late September 2024, similar dress-up game called It Girl's creator, Sara accused Gigi on Twitter of making fatphobic comments about her and wanting to falsely accuse her of rape and get It Girl taken down based on the Digital Millennium Copyright Act (DMCA). Shortly after, another Roblox developer soon accused Gigi of making racist comments and being involved in a Discord server in which underage users shared nude images of themselves. Gigi soon responded in a Google Doc posted to Twitter, apologizing for joking about falsely accusing Sara of rape while denying claims of fatphobia, racism, and sharing naked photos of minors.

Later, on October 19, 2024, the Halloween update was released. The update included new gameplay methods (including an optional storyline) as well as outfits. On December 14, 2024, Dress to Impress released their Christmas update, alongside a limited code item available only for three hours after the game's update; this resulted in the game crashing during the first minutes of the update due to the mass amount of players attempting to enter so they could redeem the code. The game also released an advent calendar with an exclusive reward for users that played daily.

In February 2025, the game released a Valentine's Day update, including an updated and more organized map. In March 2025, Dress to Impress released the beta of their new gamemode, Style Showdown. In August 2025, a collaboration with American singer Lady Gaga was announced and was scheduled to take place on August 16–23, 2025. The event is based on her 2025 album Mayhem. The event feature a new theme where players would be able to receive items related to Lady Gaga. The event included a style showtime mode based on one of Lady Gaga's songs, titled Zombieboy. Lady Gaga also acted as a judge in some of the competitions. However, the live event was controversial for being less of a meet and greet. In November 2025, a collaboration with the 2025 film Wicked: For Good was announced and took place between November 8–29 of 2025. This update included new themes, items and a pose pack.

== Reception ==
Kelsey Raynor of VG247 wrote that Dress to Impress was "pretty damned good" and "surprisingly competitive". Ana Diaz, for Polygon, wrote that "the coolest part" of Dress to Impress was that it "gives young people a place to play with new kinds of looks", calling it "a wild place where a diversity of tastes play out in real time every single day with thousands of players". For Eurogamer, Emma Kent praised Dress to Impress as having a "simple yet brilliant idea" whose "secret ingredient" was its "jankiness"—its allowance of players to equip more than 18 elements at once despite potential clipping, its "tricky" user interface, and its "absurd" posing animations—which, she argued, gave players "enormous flexibility" when creating looks. Madison Beer stated in August 2024 that playing the game was "healing" for her.

Alexandria Lopez of The Mary Sue attributed the game's popularity among livestreamers to its "model-like men and women avatars", its "competitive aspect" and the sense of accomplishment from winning, and its "tap[ping] into the same satisfaction as fast fashion". For The New York Times, Jessica Roy wrote that it was so successful due to its ability to be played on any computer or phone and its "highly customizable model" differentiating it from other Roblox games and "appeal[ing] to the fashion-obsessed". She also credited it with diversifying the age range of players on Roblox. Kotaku's Alyssa Mercante wrote that the game "[broke] out of Roblox containment in a manner heretofore unseen" by "ushering in new, older players to join [Roblox's] relatively young player base", comparing it to "an '00s-era Bratz game".

By spring of 2024, Dress to Impress became a meme on TikTok, where users posted comical outfits and about the game's "Pose 28" emote, which causes avatars to push their pelvis forward with their arms behind them and which American high school students mimicked in videos. Pose 28 also became part of another TikTok trend in September 2024 in which users hit the pose while showing off their real-life outfits.

Dress to Impress also became a popular choice among video game livestreamers, including singer Madison Beer, Pokimane, Kai Cenat, and CaseOh, by August. YouTuber James Charles also played the game in several videos of his. Various Roblox games with similar concepts to Dress to Impress, including It Girl, which was created by a developer named Sara, and Slay the Runway, were also released after Dress to Impress.

In September 2024, Dress to Impress routinely had the most concurrent users (CCUs) of any game on Roblox, usually averaging over 250 thousand, and according to a Roblox spokesperson, had been played over 2.7 billion times. At the 2024 Roblox Innovation Awards, Dress to Impress won the awards for Builderman Choice of Excellence, Best Creative Direction, and Best New Experience.

== See also ==
- List of Roblox games – A list-topic about notable Roblox games
