= The Good Daughter (American TV series) =

2026 American television series

- Release poster
- Genre: Thriller
- Created by: Karin Slaughter
- Based on: The Good Daughter by Karin Slaughter
- Written by: Karin Slaughter
- Directed by: Steph Green
- Starring: Rose Byrne; Meghann Fahy; Michael Dorman; Harper Steele; Audrey Grace Marshall; Drew Ann Cheek; Jake McDorman; Shayna Benardo; Paula Malcomson; Olivia Williams; Brendan Gleeson
- Music by: Jonathan Sanford
- Country of origin: United States
- Original language: English
- No. of episodes: 6

Production
- Executive producers: Bruna Papandrea; Steve Hutensky; Casey Haver; Rose Byrne; Steph Green; Karin Slaughter
- Producer: Darren Demetre
- Cinematography: Zoë White
- Editors: Deborah Peart; Dany Cooper
- Running time: 47–56 minutes
- Production companies: Karin Slaughter Productions; Fifth Season; Made Up Stories

Original release
- Network: Peacock
- Release: November 12, 2026

The Good Daughter is an American limited series starring Rose Byrne and Meghann Fahy. It is created and adapted to television by Karin Slaughter, based on her novel of the same name. It premiered on Peacock on November 12, 2026 and received generally positive reviews from critics.

== Premise ==
Twenty years after a violent attack on their family, sisters Charlotte and Samantha Quinn are still living with its effects. Charlotte, who has followed her father into law, is the first witness on the scene when another violent attack takes place in their hometown of Pikeville, Georgia. The investigation that follows brings old memories and family secrets to the surface.

== Cast ==
=== Main ===
- Rose Byrne as Samantha 'Sam' Quinn, Charlie's older sister and a patent attorney in New York City
  - Audrey Grace Marshall as Young Sam
- Meghann Fahy as Charlotte 'Charlie' Quinn, Sam's younger sister and a defense attorney in Pikeville, Georgia
  - Drew Ann Cheek as Young Charlie
- Michael Dorman as Ben Bernard, Charlie's estranged husband and the assistant district attorney of Pikeville
- Harper Steele as Lenore, Rusty's secretary
- Jake McDorman as Mason/Huck
- Shayna Benardo as Kelly Wilson, a school shooting suspect and Charlie's client
- Paula Malcomson as Judith Heller Pinkman
- Olivia Williams as Harriet 'Gamma' Quinn, the sisters' mother
- Brendan Gleeson as Rusty Quinn, the sisters' father and a defense attorney in Pikeville, Georgia

=== Recurring ===
- Jessica Miesel as Ava Wilson, Kelly's mother
- Afemo Omilami as Jimmy Jack Little
- Jayson Warner Smith as Keith Coin, the Sheriff of Pikeville
- Jason Davis as Kenny Coin, the district attorney of Pikeville
- Ray Panthaki as Anton, Sam's late husband

== Episodes ==
| No. | Title | Directed by | Written by | Original release date |
|---|---|---|---|---|
| 1 | "What Happened to Charlie" | Steph Green | Karin Slaughter | November 12, 2026 |
| 2 | "What Happened to Sam" | Steph Green | Karin Slaughter | November 12, 2026 |
| 3 | "What Happened in New York" | Steph Green | Karin Slaughter | November 12, 2026 |
| 4 | "What Happened to Rusty" | Steph Green | Karin Slaughter | November 12, 2026 |
| 5 | "What Really Happened to Charlie" | Steph Green | Karin Slaughter | November 12, 2026 |
| 6 | "What Really Happened" | Steph Green | Karin Slaughter | November 12, 2026 |

== Production ==
=== Development ===
The series was announced in March 2024 with Karin Slaughter adapting her own novel and executive producer, with Fifth Season and Made Up Stories producing following a series order from Peacock, and Jessica Biel attached to star and Bruna Papandrea, Steve Hutensky and Casey Haver among the executive producers. Biel departed the project in September 2024.

=== Casting ===
Rose Byrne and Meghann Fahy joined the cast as sisters, Samantha and Charlotte Quinn, in December 2024. Byrne is also an executive producer. It was also announced that Steph Green will direct and executive produce all episodes. In February 2025, they were joined in the cast by Brendan Gleeson, Harper Steele, Paula Malcomson and Jake McDorman. In March, Olivia Williams, Michael Dorman, Audrey Grace Marshall and Drew Cheek joined the cast.

=== Filming ===
Principal photography began in Atlanta, Georgia and the surrounding areas in March 2025 with a schedule lasting into June. Filming locations included Griffin City Hall and Assembly Studios.

== Release ==
The six-episode limited series premiered on Peacock on November 12, 2026.

== Reception ==
The review aggregator website Rotten Tomatoes reported an approval rating of 78% based on 23 critic reviews, with an average of rated reviews of 7.0/10. Metacritic, which uses a weighted average, assigned a score of 64 out of 100 based on 16 critics, indicating "generally favorable" reviews.
