= Esme, My Love =

- Theatrical release poster
- Directed by: Cory Choy
- Written by: Laura Allen; Cory Choy
- Produced by: Cory Choy
- Starring: Audrey Grace Marshall; Stacey Weckstein
- Cinematography: Fletcher Wolfe
- Edited by: Emrys Eller; Ellie Gravitte
- Music by: Stephanie Griffin; Charlottle Littlehales
- Production company: Silver Sound
- Distributed by: Terror Films
- Release date: March 12, 2022
- Running time: 104 minutes
- Country: United States
- Language: English

Esme, My Love is a 2022 American psychological horror film co-written, produced, and directed by Cory Choy. The film delves into the complexities of a mother-daughter relationship strained by the specter of a terminal illness and a dark family secret.

An indie-festival darling, "Esme, My Love won best thriller/suspense film, best director for Choy and best cinematographer for Fletcher Wolfe at the Cannes World Film Festival," among others.

== Synopsis ==
Esme, My Love set in the old DeLarm campground and dairy farm in Hague, New York, is a psychological thriller that begins as a slow-burn drama. The film follows Hannah and her daughter Esme, in whom Hannah sees the signs of a terminal illness, as they embark on a camping trip to an abandoned house in the woods. Despite initial reluctance, Esme joins her mother who obsessively digs in the soil and frequently mentions a mysterious “Emily”. After consuming preserved peaches from the house, they experience adverse effects and their journey takes a dark turn. Hannah's increasingly strange behavior and a discovered journal that eerily mirrors their present situation lead to disconcerting manifestations and signs of violence. This quiet story about parenting and memory spirals into an unpredictable exploration of grief and loss.

== Cast ==
- Audrey Grace Marshall as Esme
- Stacey Weckstein as Hannah

== Release ==
The distributor, Terror Films, released the film in the United States on VOD on June 2, 2023.

== Critical reception ==
Esme, My Love received positive critical reception. On Rotten Tomatoes the film has a 64% approval rating, based on 14 reviews with an average rating of 6.2/10.

Josiah Teal of Film Threat wrote that Esme, My Love subverts expectations and "features strong performances that (...) bring complex emotions to life." While Teal described the film's conclusion as "abrupt and seem[ing] uneven with the genres at play," he termed it overall a "solid feat in filmmaking".

The Los Angeles Times's Noel Murray noted that the "intentionally opaque" premise is not the film's main focus, but instead serves "as a foundation for a series of beautifully shot vignettes". FilmInk's Annette Basile wrote that while the film was "beautifully shot and well acted", it lacked suspense and was too repetitive.
