= Audrey Grace Marshall =

American actress

- Born: November 3, 2008 (age 18); Indianapolis, Indiana, U.S.
- Occupation: Actress
- Years active: 2016–present

Audrey Grace Marshall is an American actress. She is known for playing Viv Turner in the Nickelodeon television series The Fairly OddParents: Fairly Odder and Young Cassie in the comedy drama series The Flight Attendant.

== Early life ==
Marshall was born in Indianapolis, Indiana. She credits Liv and Maddie, particularly Dove Cameron's ability to play two different characters as a major influence on her wanting to become an actress.

== Career ==
Marshall's biggest role of her career so far has been playing Viv in The Fairly OddParents: Fairly Odder. For her performance as Viv she was nominated for Favourite Female TV Star (Kids) at the 2023 Kids' Choice Awards. She lost to Olivia Rodrigo's character Nini from High School Musical: The Musical: The Series. Marshall is also well known for appearing in The Flight Attendant starring Kaley Cuoco. In March 2025 it was announced that Marshall would be cast in the upcoming TV series The Good Daughter starring Rose Byrne, Meghann Fahy and Brendan Gleeson. In August 2025 it was announced that Marshall would be added to a reboot of Buffy the Vampire Slayer.

== Personal life ==
In her free time Marshall likes to ride and show horses and is currently working with a trainer in the English hunter jumper discipline. She also studies ballet.

== Filmography ==
=== Film ===
| Year | Title | Role | Notes |
|---|---|---|---|
| 2016 | It's Okay | Child Jane | Short |
| 2017 | Joy Ride | Emma | Short |
| 2017 | Hello | Bonnie | Short |
| 2017 | A Very Merry Toy Store | Eleanor | |
| 2017 | Starling | Jessie Ryerson | Short |
| 2018 | Mortal Wounds | Maggie | Short |
| 2018 | How to Make a Bomb in the Kitchen of Your Mom | | Short |
| 2019 | Jane Love | Young Jane Love | Short |
| 2020 | Small Time | Emma | |
| 2021 | Mother | Young Katie | |
| 2022 | Esme, My Love | Esme | |
| 2024 | Speak with the Dead | Maggie | Short |
| 2025 | Echo Valley | Mallory Hanway | |
| 2026 | Mouse | Cara | |

=== Television ===
| Year | Title | Role | Notes |
|---|---|---|---|
| 2017 | The Real Story with Maria Elena Salinas | Katie Field | Episode: "An Unspeakable Tragedy" |
| 2019 | Jessica Jones | Young Trish | Episode: "A.K.A. Hellcat" |
| 2022 | The Fairly OddParents: Fairly Odder | Vivian "Viv" Turner | Main role; 13 episodes |
| 2020–2022 | The Flight Attendant | Young Cassie | 13 episodes |
| 2022 | Headless: A Sleepy Hollow Story | Christa Pierson | 2 episodes |
| 2025 | Electric Bloom | Janine | 2 episodes |
