= The Naughty Nine =

2023 Disney film by Alberto Belli

- Promotional poster
- Genre: Christmas heist
- Written by: Jed Elinoff; Scott Thomas
- Directed by: Alberto Belli
- Starring: Winslow Fegley; Camila Rodriguez; Derek Theler; Deric McCabe; Clara Stack; Anthony Joo; Ayden Elijah; Imogen Cohen; Madilyn Kellam; Danny Glover
- Music by: Kenny Wood
- Country of origin: United States
- Original language: English

Production
- Executive producers: Suzanne Todd; Jed Elinoff; Scott Thomas
- Producers: Amy Gibbons; Jim Kontos
- Editor: Evan Ahlgren
- Running time: 83 minutes
- Production companies: NeoReel; Rotten Eggs Productions; Poutine Productions, Inc.

Original release
- Network: Disney Channel
- Release: November 22, 2023

The Naughty Nine is an American Christmas heist television film directed by Alberto Belli. The film stars Winslow Fegley, Camila Rodriguez, Derek Theler, Deric McCabe, Clara Stack, Anthony Joo, Ayden Elijah, Imogen Cohen, Madilyn Kellam, and Danny Glover. It premiered on Disney Channel on November 22, 2023.

== Plot ==
Andy Steele is a 5th grade boy who constantly gets into trouble with his best friend Dulce Gutierrez. They recently pulled a heist involving stealing confiscated toys from their school to return to kids in exchange for money. Andy is constantly at odds with his sister Laurel who always does the right thing and constantly tries to out Andy for his schemes, though she is usually outwitted.

On Christmas Day, Andy realizes that he did not get his video game console for Christmas while Dulce similarly did not get her bow and arrow set. They learn from their tech savvy friend Lewis Sobong that they are most likely on the naughty list. Through his internet algorithm, he reveals the numerous other kids also on the list. Feeling that Santa's selectiveness has gone too far, Andy and Dulce decide to go to the North Pole to get their presents with Lewis agreeing, despite him not being naughty.

Andy and Dulce have Lewis narrow the naughty list candidates to the locals. From the results, Andy, Dulce, and Lewis recruit the following:

- Ha-Yoon Si-u, a girl with a love for daredevil stunts who is naughty due to her reckless behavior.
- Rose Wingert, an animal whisperer who was caught letting loose wild animals.
- Jon Anthony Dizon, a boy and fashion designer whose naughty behavior is not made obvious.
- Albert Reyes, a young boy who uses his cuteness to get what he wants.
- Bethany, Laurel's snooty gymnast rival.

Andy learns that one of his father's coworkers, a pilot named Bruno, claimed to have seen Santa's reindeer during one of his cargo flights. He decides to help Andy out so that he can be vindicated. At the last minute, Dulce contacts Andy telling him that Bethany has backed out after she ends up getting the cell phone that her parents finally got her. Andy manages to recruit a reluctant Laurel to fill in for her by claiming that Bethany made fun of the fact that Laurel can't pull off the job.

Bruno flies the kids to the North Pole where Jon Anthony privately admits to Rose that he is on the naughty list because his "originals" are actually stolen designs. Nevertheless, he manages to make compelling elf costumes for everyone. The group is forced to make an emergency landing, though Bruno manages to coax the local air force that he is simply taking inventory. The kids sneak into Santa's Village by using Albert's cuteness to distract an elf. Rose and Ha-Yoon recruit some of Santa's reindeer for a getaway while Lewis finds the security room. Andy, Dulce, Jon Anthony, and Laurel stop by an elf party where they briefly have fun, but Andy forces everyone to leave. When they find the naughty list, they discover that they are indeed on there, except for Laurel and they find Santa's mostly empty vault along with each of their gifts and they take them. As payback, Laurel takes what was supposed to be Bethany's phone.

The group manage to escape thanks to Rose and Ha-Yoon and grab Lewis and Albert while fleeing from elf security. When Andy sees that Laurel snatched Bethany's phone for herself, he becomes disillusioned. Bruno warns them that he is being forced back into the air and the kids are forced to jump into the moving plane. However, Andy decides not to get on and retains the gifts as elf security catches him.

He is taken to Santa Claus himself who threatens to put him and everyone else on the naughty list permanently, but Andy insists that he should be the only one punished. When Santa limits the list to simply him and Laurel, Andy is shocked. The rest of the Naughty Nine are brought in and Andy and Laurel make amends with each other. Santa tells them that no one is ever kept on the naughty list permanently and that they just need to be nice, but not change who they are. The Naughty Nine are allowed to leave. Though Bruno does get a selfie with Santa who allows it.

One year later, Andy has been extra good all year and is called into the principal's office. Upon arrival, Andy is greeted by Santa who tells him that he needs him to re-recruit the Naughty Nine for an unknown purpose.

== Cast ==
- Winslow Fegley as Andy Steele, a fifth-grader that prepares the heist of the North Pole. He's on the naughty list for this reason and many more.
- Camila Rodriguez as Dulce Gutierrez, Andy's best friend who has really good aim.
- Derek Theler as Bruno, a pilot that Andy recruits into the Naughty Nine to take them to the North Pole.
- Deric McCabe as Jon Anthony Dizon, a boy who is really good at making clothes, although he's never designed anything himself. He's on the naughty list for fraud and designs the Naughty Nine's disguises.
- Clara Stack as Rose Wingert, a girl who understands animals and can talk to them. She's on the naughty list for freeing captive animals and is the Naughty Nine's animal whisperer.
- Anthony Joo as Lewis Sobong, a boy that has studied the North Pole and Santa's Village for years.
- Ayden Elijah as Albert Reyes, a young boy who takes advantage of others because he's cute. He's on the naughty list for this reason and is the Naughty Nine's "adorable innocent".
- Imogen Cohen as Ha-Yoon Si-u, a daredevil girl who loves driving recklessly. She's on the naughty list for this reason and is the Naughty Nine's getaway driver.
- Madilyn Kellam as Laurel Steele, Andy's "goody two-shoes" sister who is a gymnast.
- Danny Glover as Santa Claus
- Liyou Abere as Bethany, a snooty gymnast and Laurel's rival who was an original candidate for the Naughty Nine. She's on the naughty list for her snootiness.

== Production ==
=== Development ===
On February 7, 2022, it was announced that Disney Branded Television was developing a holiday heist film titled The Naughty Nine for Disney Channel and Disney+. The film was set to be directed by Alberto Belli and executive produced by Suzanne Todd, Jed Elinoff, and Scott Thomas. Elinoff and Thomas also served as the writers for the film. Winslow Fegley, Camila Rodriguez, Anthony Joo, Clara Stack, Imogen Cohen, Madilyn Kellam and Deric McCabe were all cast in the film, but none of their roles were specified.

=== Casting ===
On September 28, 2023, it was announced that Danny Glover joined the cast as Santa Claus in the film.

=== Filming ===
Principal photography was already underway in Montreal, Canada in February 2022. Filming continued until April 2022. A lot of the pivotal scenes were shot in Pointe-Claire in March 2022. The filming unit covered the grassy green area in the middle of the street with gravel. It was done to turn it into a temporary parking lot for trucks and trailers. Many residents of the area were upset about this and complained about the green space and thought it was too disturbing and disruptive for locals.

== Release ==
The Naughty Nine premiered on November 22, 2023, on Disney Channel. It was released on November 23, 2023, on Disney+.

== Reception ==
=== Critical response ===
On the review aggregator website Rotten Tomatoes, 67% of 6 critics' reviews are positive, with an average rating of 5.70/10.

Maddy Casale of Decider wrote, "The Naughty Nine is an entertaining film that is full of holiday fun for the whole family. Just keep an eye on your kiddos after watching to make sure they don’t start planning hell-raising heists of their own!" Randy Myers of The Mercury News called the film "clever" and complimented the performances of the cast, describing The Naughty Nine as a "gift that won’t wear out its welcome in years to come." Fernanda Camargo of Common Sense Media gave The Naughty Nine a grade of four out of five stars and complimented the depiction of positive messages and role models, citing friendship and responsibility.

=== Accolades ===
Kenny Wood was nominated for David Raksin Award for Emerging Talent at the 2024 Society of Composers & Lyricists Awards.
