= Adopt Me! =

2017 Roblox video game

- Adopt Me!' logo
- Developer: Uplift Games
- Publisher: Uplift Games
- Director: Bethink
- Programmer: NewFissy
- Engine: Roblox Studio
- Platforms: List: Windows; macOS; Xbox One; iOS; iPadOS; Android; Xbox Series X/S; PlayStation 4; PlayStation 5
- Release: July 13, 2017; 9 years ago
- Genres: MMORPG, pet-raising simulation
- Mode: Multiplayer

Adopt Me! (stylized in all caps) is a massively multiplayer online role-playing game (MMORPG) developed and published by Uplift Games, formerly known as DreamCraft, on the online game platform and game creation system, Roblox. It was released on July 13, 2017, for Windows, Xbox One, PlayStation 4, Xbox Series X/S, and PlayStation 5. The original focus of the game was a family role-play, where in players either acted as a parent adopting a child, or a child getting adopted.

As the game developed, its focus shifted to adopting and caring for virtual pets, which could also be traded with other players. Uplift Games employs roughly 40 people and earns US$60,000,000 from the game a year, often from microtransactions. Adopt Me! had averaged over 100,000 concurrent users (CCUs) in September 2022. As of October 2026, Adopt Me! had surpassed over 45 billion visits.

== Gameplay ==
A player with their pet (a Wolf wearing sunglasses) in their house

Adopt Me! is a pet-raising simulation that revolves around adopting and caring for various pet-types that hatch from eggs. Eggs can each hatch different pets. Starter eggs, given to players when they play for the first time, for example hatches only a dog or a cat. While some pets can only be purchased with Roblox's virtual currency, Robux. Pets are grouped into five classes based on rarity and cost: common, uncommon, rare, ultra-rare, and legendary. Once hatched, pets grow from their starting status as newborns, growing up into juniors, pre-teens, teens, post-teens, and eventually becoming full-grown. Players are also able to trade pets with other players.

If a player has four fully grown pets of the same type, they can combine them to form a "Neon" pet, and four fully grown neon pets can be combined into a "Mega-Neon" pet. Purchases within the game are facilitated both by Robux, and through Adopt Me!'s virtual currency, which is simply just called, "Bucks". Bucks can be earned by fulfilling the needs of a pet, such as eating & drinking, among other methods. Players can also adopt children and role-play with other players.

== History ==
Prior to 2018, Adopt Me! was solely about adopting children, in line with several previous Roblox games with the same concept. Originally, the game was a collaboration between two Roblox players who go by the usernames "Bethink" and "NewFissy". Adopt Me! added the feature of adoptable pets in summer of 2019, which caused the game to rapidly increase in popularity. Adopt Me! had been played slightly over three billion times by December 2019.

During the 2020 April Fools event, Adopt Me! received an update including a Pet Rock, available for a limited time. This update allowed the game to achieve 680,000 active players, three times as much as the strategy action role-playing game, Mount & Blade II: Bannerlord, which had the most active players on Steam at the time. In July 2020, the game had been played over ten billion times. By March 2021, Adopt Me! had around 20 billion total visits.

=== Promotional events ===
In May 2020, Uplift Games partnered up with Warner Bros. Pictures & Warner Animation Group to promote the CGI-animated film Scoob!. As part of the event, Scooby-Doo (as a puppy) was brought into the game as a temporary pet where players could drive around in the Mystery Machine (also for a limited-time) and complete a task where they could help find his missing collar in-exchange for three detective-themed pet accessories. The pet, vehicle and collar were later removed from the game after the event concluded.

On November 18, 2021, they partnered with Universal Pictures & Illumination to promote the CGI-animated film Sing 2. For the event, players could talk to Buster Moon next to a stage to complete a task of finding different pieces across the map in-exchange for a Galaxy Explorer pet accessory helmet. The Buster Moon NPC, stage & pieces were later removed from the game after the event concluded.

On June 16, 2022, they partnered again with Universal Pictures & Illumination to promote the CGI-animated film Minions: The Rise of Gru. The event allowed players to talk to Gru to adopt a Zodiac Minion Egg. To hatch the egg, players can complete various tasks eventually leading the egg hatching into a Zodiac Minion Chick.

== Popularity ==
The game averaged 160,000 active players as of September 2022, making it one of the most popular and successful games on Roblox. The highest number of active players Adopt Me! has achieved is 1.92 million. Around a third of Roblox players on the Xbox One play Adopt Me!.

Due to the presence of microtransactions in the game and the target demographic being young children, there have been instances of children spending large amounts of money on Adopt Me!, including one particular incident where a child from Australia spent A$8,000 (US$6,348.88) on the game. The number of players playing Adopt Me! usually triple whenever a major update occurs & causes platform-wide disruption on Roblox.

== Reception ==
Adopt Me! received generally positive reviews from critics. PCGamesN, in an overview of what they considered the best games on Roblox, described it as "cute", and compared it positively to the Petz series, while Screen Rant described it as one of the "most well-known RPGs". Adopt Me! received a nomination for "Favorite Video Game" at the 2023 Kids' Choice Awards.

=== Scams ===
As of 2021, the game became notorious for its rise of scammers who scam players for virtual pets. Due to the high cost of pets within the game, with some rare pets selling for up to US$300 on off-platform sites, a large subculture of scammers had risen within Adopt Me!. As the primary player base of Adopt Me! is on average younger children, who are especially susceptible to falling for scams.

One of the most common ways in which scammers carry out their operations is through "trust trades", in which the scammer manipulates players to trust them and trade a rare virtual item, promising to give it back. The scammer either leaves the game with the victim's item, or blocking the victim to continue scamming other players.

Adopt Me! had released several new features focused on combating scams in November 2020, including the introduction of "trade licenses" that are required to be earned before one can trade pets above rare rarity. It also affected the amount of pets a player could trade, and the addition of viewable trade history and the addition of notifications to the player if the game detects a markedly unfair trade. Other actions include increasing the amount of slots within a trade, initially from four to nine, and then from nine to eighteen to prevent people from making multiple trades and potentially losing their pets. Furthermore, in future updates, players are now notified if a pet that was offered is removed from the slot.

== See also ==
- List of Roblox games – A list-topic about notable Roblox games
