= Imogen Cohen =

American actress

- Born: 9 May 2011 (age 15); Castro Valley, California, United States
- Occupation: Actress
- Years active: 2019–present

Imogen Cohen is an American actress. She is best known for playing Zina Zacarias in the Nickelodeon television series The Fairly OddParents: Fairly Odder and as Ha-Yoon Si-u in The Naughty Nine.

== Early life ==
Cohen was born in Castro Valley, California. She was influenced to become an actress by her parents. She would attend her mom's symphony concerts as well as her dad's Shakespeare plays since she was 4. She additionally would hang out with her mom's friend's daughter, who picked up playing violin from Immy's mom.

== Career ==
Cohens biggest role of her career so far has been playing Zina in The Fairly OddParents: Fairly Odder. For her performance as Zina she was nominated for Favourite Female TV Star(Kids) at the 2023 Kids' Choice Awards. She lost to Olivia Rodrigo's character Nini from High School Musical: The Musical: The Series Cohen is also well known for appearing in The Naughty Nine starring Winslow Fegley.

== Personal life ==
Cohen enjoys dancing across different styles. She has expressed appreciation for the work of William Shakespeare and Shel Silverstein citing the humor in their poetry and sonnets.

== Filmography ==
=== Film ===
| Year | Title | Role | Notes |
|---|---|---|---|
| 2019 | Dear Mom | Karen Anvil | Short |
| 2023 | The Naughty Nine | Ha-Yoon Si-u | Main role |

=== Television ===
| Year | Title | Role | Notes |
|---|---|---|---|
| 2022 | The Fairly OddParents: Fairly Odder | Zina Zacarias | Main role; 12 episodes |
| 2023 | Bunk'd | Cleo | Episode; Meat Cute |
| 2024 | The Loud House | Amber | Episode; Let's Break a Deal/A Dish Come True |
