= Girls Like Us (Zoe Wees song) =

2021 single by Zoe Wees

Single by Zoe Wees

from the EP Golden Wings and Therapy
- Released: 12 January 2021
- Recorded: 2020
- Length: 3:09
- Label: Valeria Music
- Songwriter(s): Hight; Patrick Pyke Salmy; Ricardo Muñoz; Nicolas Rebscher; Zoe Wees
- Producer(s): Patrick Pyke Salmy; Ricardo Muñoz; Nicolas Rebscher

Zoe Wees singles chronology
| "Control" (2020) | "Girls Like Us" (2021) | "Ghost" (2021) |

Music video
- "Girls Like Us" on YouTube

"Girls Like Us" is a song by German singer Zoe Wees. It was released in January 2021 as the second single from her debut EP Golden Wings and on her debut studio album, Therapy.

Wees said "For me, it was the hardest feeling to grow up in a world that you feel doesn't accept you. We all have insecurities, but this is what makes us beautiful... I feel really happy to tell people about what I've been through, because I know I’m not the only one."

== Track listing ==
1 track single
| No. | Title | Length |
|---|---|---|
| 1. | "Girls Like Us" | 3:09 |

Acoustic versions
| No. | Title | Length |
|---|---|---|
| 1. | "Girls Like Us" (piano version) | 3:05 |
| 2. | "Girls Like Us" (acoustic version) | 2:54 |
| 3. | "Girls Like Us" | 3:09 |

Muna remix
| No. | Title | Length |
|---|---|---|
| 1. | "Girls Like Us" (Muna remix) | 2:51 |
| 2. | "Girls Like Us" | 3:09 |

Felix Jaehn remix
| No. | Title | Length |
|---|---|---|
| 1. | "Girls Like Us" (Felix Jaehn remix) | 3:24 |
| 2. | "Girls Like Us" | 3:09 |

== Charts ==
=== Weekly charts ===
| Chart (2021) | Peak position |
|---|---|
| Austria (Ö3 Austria Top 40) | 10 |
| Belgium (Ultratop 50 Flanders) | 34 |
| France (SNEP) | 41 |
| Germany (GfK) | 9 |
| Sweden (Sverigetopplistan) | 65 |
| Switzerland (Schweizer Hitparade) | 3 |

=== Year-end charts ===
| Chart (2021) | Position |
|---|---|
| Switzerland (Schweizer Hitparade) | 17 |

== Certifications ==
Certifications and sales for "Girls Like Us"
| Region | Certification | Certified units/sales |
|---|---|---|
| Brazil (Pro-Música Brasil) | Gold | 20,000^{‡} |
| Canada (Music Canada) | Gold | 40,000^{‡} |
| France (SNEP) | Platinum | 200,000^{‡} |
| Germany (BVMI) | Platinum | 400,000^{‡} |
| Italy (FIMI) | Gold | 35,000^{‡} |
| Switzerland (IFPI Switzerland) | Gold | 10,000^{‡} |
^{‡} Sales+streaming figures based on certification alone.
