= Control (Zoe Wees song) =

2020 single by Zoe Wees

Single by Zoe Wees

from the EP Golden Wings
- Released: 13 March 2020
- Recorded: 2020
- Genre: Pop
- Length: 3:51
- Label: Valeria Music
- Songwriters: Patrick Pyke Salmy; Emma Sophia Rosen; Ricardo Muñoz; René Miller; Nils Bodenstedt; Zoe Wees
- Producers: Patrick Pyke Salmy; Ricardo Muñoz

Zoe Wees singles chronology
"Control" (2020)	"Girls Like Us" (2021)

Music video
- "Control" on YouTube

"Control" is the debut solo single by German singer Zoe Wees, from her debut EP Golden Wings. It released by Valeria Music on 13 March 2020 as the lead single from the EP. Written by Wees, Patrick Pyke Salmy, Emma Sophia Rosen, Ricardo Muñoz, René Miller, and Nils Bodenstedt, the song is a power ballad and about the singer's anxiety and lack of control due to her struggles with epilepsy.

== Background ==
After debuting in June 2018 as a featured artist on Moonbootica's single "Hibernating", Wees signed a record deal with the label Valeria Music, a division of Caroline Distribution, and began recording new music in early 2020.

== Music video ==
The song's official video, directed by Dennis Dirksen, was released on 27 March 2020. As of December 2022, the video has 75,191,077 views on YouTube.

== Commercial performance ==
Upon release, the song failed to chart, but in the following months it began to gain popularity on Spotify, entering the viral charts of various European countries. During the summer, "Control" reached in the top 40 of Austria, Belgium, Germany, and Switzerland. In October the song peaked at number 1 on the French Radio Singles Chart; in the same month it was certified gold in Italy for moving 35,000 units.

In the United States, after receiving massive airplay, the song peaked at number 22 on the US Mainstream Top 40 and entered the Bubbling Under Hot 100 at number 19 on the chart issue dated 31 October 2020. In June 2025 it was certified platinum in the country for moving 1,000,000 units.

== Charts ==
=== Weekly charts ===
Chart (2020)	Peak position
Austria (Ö3 Austria Top 40)	28
Belgium (Ultratop 50 Flanders)	6
Belgium (Ultratop 50 Wallonia)	3
Croatia International Airplay (Top lista)	62
France (SNEP)	22
Germany (GfK)	31
Italy (FIMI)	65
Netherlands (Dutch Top 40)	25
Netherlands (Single Top 100)	63
Romania (Airplay 100)	51
San Marino (SMRRTV Top 50)	35
Slovenia (SloTop50)	12
Switzerland (Schweizer Hitparade)	11
US Bubbling Under Hot 100 Singles (Billboard)	6
US Adult Top 40 (Billboard)	22
US Mainstream Top 40 (Billboard)	21

=== Year-end charts ===
Chart (2020)	Position
Belgium (Ultratop Flanders)	45
Belgium (Ultratop Wallonia)	12
France (SNEP)	172
Germany (Official German Charts)	66
Netherlands (Dutch Top 40)	97
Switzerland (Schweizer Hitparade)	25

Chart (2021)	Position
Switzerland (Schweizer Hitparade)	97

== Certifications ==
Certifications and sales for "Control"
Region	Certification	Certified units/sales
Belgium (BRMA)	Gold	20,000^{‡}
Brazil (Pro-Música Brasil)	Gold	20,000^{‡}
Canada (Music Canada)	2× Platinum	160,000^{‡}
Denmark (IFPI Danmark)	Gold	45,000^{‡}
France (SNEP)	Diamond	333,333^{‡}
Germany (BVMI)	Platinum	400,000^{‡}
Italy (FIMI)	Platinum	100,000^{‡}
New Zealand (RMNZ)	Platinum	30,000^{‡}
Poland (ZPAV)	Platinum	50,000^{‡}
Portugal (AFP)	Gold	5,000^{‡}
Spain (PROMUSICAE)	Gold	30,000^{‡}
Switzerland (IFPI Switzerland)	3× Platinum	60,000^{‡}
United Kingdom (BPI)	Platinum	600,000^{‡}
United States (RIAA)	Platinum	1,000,000^{‡}
Streaming
Sweden (GLF)	Platinum	8,000,000^{†}
^{‡} Sales+streaming figures based on certification alone.^{†} Streaming-only figures based on certification alone.
