= Unspeakable (YouTuber) =

American YouTuber (born 1997)

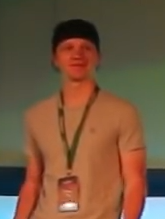
- Milner in 2018
- Born: Nathan Johnson Milner; December 5, 1997 (age 28); Houston, Texas, U.S.

YouTube information
- Channels: Unspeakable; UnspeakablePlays; UnspeakableReacts
- Years active: 2012–present
- Genres: Gaming; challenge; vlog
- Subscribers: 44.83 millon (Note: Subscribers, broken down by channel: 20.2 million (Unspeakable); 11.6 million (UnspeakableReacts); 8.37 million (UnspeakablePlays); 4.66 million (Unspeakable Studio))
- Views: 2.29 billion (Note: Views, broken down by channel: 12.64 billion (Unspeakable); 5.65 billion (UnspeakableReacts); 3.14 billion (UnspeakablePlays); 1.54 billion (Unspeakable Studio))
- Last updated: November 21, 2026
- Website: unspeakable.com

Nathan Milner (born December 5, 1997), known online as Unspeakable, is an American YouTuber. He gained popularity by playing the video game Minecraft, but has also expanded to other games in addition to making variety content. His main channel primarily consists of vlogging and challenge content.

== Early life ==
Nathan Milner was born on December 5, 1997, and grew up in Kingwood, Houston, Texas.

== Career ==
Milner created his YouTube channel in October 2012 and uploaded his first video in November of that year. After nearly four years of making videos, he first broke through in popularity with his video "How Much TNT Does It Take to Blow Up This House!?", uploaded in October 2016. The attention he received from this video led PrestonPlayz, a future frequent collaborator, to first reach out to him. In 2019, he played hide-and-seek with John Travolta in the latter's mansion. In November 2022, he also opened a recreational center and indoor adventure park called Bolder, in Grand Prairie. In January 2023, Milner held his first live show, at the Toyota Center. PrestonPlayz made a guest appearance, and they filled the Center with over two million plastic balls. In 2023, Milner signed an advertising partnership with Studio71.

== Awards and nominations ==
Year	Award	Category	Result	Ref.
2022	Kids' Choice Awards	Favorite Male Creator	Nominated	
2024	Kids' Choice Awards	Favorite Gamer	Nominated	
2025	Kids' Choice Awards	Favorite Gamer	Nominated	
2022	Streamy Awards	Collaboration	Nominated	
