= Alex Balfanz =

American video game developer (born 1999)

- Born: May 5, 1999 (age 27); Orlando, Florida, U.S.
- Other names: badcc; badccvoid
- Occupation: Video game developer
- Years active: 2008–present
- Known for: Co-creator and programmer of the popular Roblox game, Jailbreak.; Co-founder of the popular Roblox community that controls Jailbreak, Badimo.

Alex Balfanz (born May 5, 1999), known more commonly online by his pseudonym, badcc, is an American video game developer who is the co-creator and a programmer of the popular Roblox game, Jailbreak, with also being the co-founder of the Roblox community who currently controls Jailbreak, Badimo.

== Early life ==
Balfanz began to code games using Roblox Studio at the age of 9. Balfanz's father worked as a programmer, which Balfanz cites as one of the main reasons for his early interest in coding. He attended high school at the Trinity Preparatory School.

Prior to releasing Jailbreak, Balfanz had made several other games on Roblox, which he stated had made him "maybe a couple thousand" dollars. Balfanz attended Duke University, where he studied computer science and statistics and paid off his college debt using funds from his games.

== Career ==
In January 2016, Balfanz and his business partner, asimo3089, created the game, Volt, an open world game in which players complete minigames. In January 2017, Balfanz, along with asimo3089, uploaded Jailbreak, a cops-and-robbers game, onto Roblox. On its first day of release, it reached 70,000 concurrent users (CCUs), a number which Balfanz later said had shocked him. It quickly became one of the most popular games on the platform and made Balfanz a millionaire.
