= Zoe Wees =

German singer (born 2002)

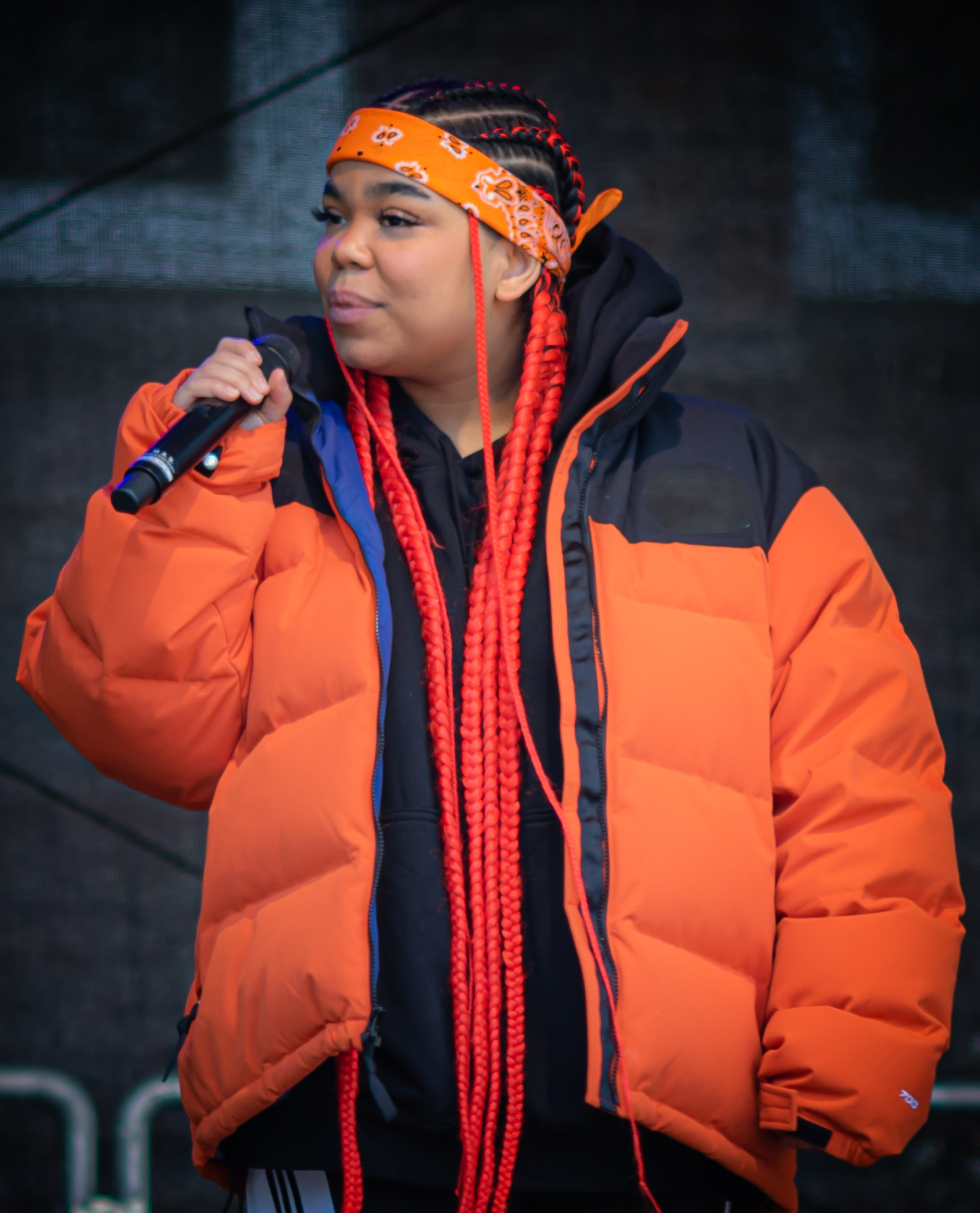
- Wees in 2022

Background information
- Born: 13 May 2002 (age 23); Hamburg, Germany
- Genres: Pop
- Occupations: Singer; songwriter
- Years active: 2019–present
- Labels: Valeria Music, Capitol Records

Zoe Wees (German and English: /ˈzoʊi wiːs/; born 13 May 2002) is a German singer. Her debut single "Control" charted in several nations including number one in France (SNEP Radio) and the top ten in Belgium.

== Background ==
Wees grew up in Hamburg. Her father is Jamaican and her mother is German. She has lived with benign rolandic epilepsy (BRE), a syndrome that caused her to have feelings of exclusion from others, helplessness, and loss of control. Wees stated, "The sickness was stronger than me, and left scars that have become part of my life. Accepting them has taken so much time, but they make me what I am today: a fighter."

Wees' music has been described as "raw, deeply emotional", with a voice that ranges "from raspy low to unbelievably powerful and sky high". Wees can often be found playing the piano or guitar.

Wees attended the Grund- und Stadtteilschule Alter Teichweg, a school in Dulsberg.

== Career ==
Wees has written music in English since childhood. She began working on music as a teenager when her teacher came up to her after a school concert wanting to work with her on music. In early 2017, Wees took part in the fifth season of the music talent show The Voice Kids. Wees joined pop singer Sasha's team in the Blind Auditions. In the Sing-Offs, the third of five phases in the competition, Wees was eliminated. Wees released the song "Control" on 13 March 2020. The song is written about anxiety and not being in control, but more specifically, about her battle with benign rolandic epilepsy. Her mission in writing the song was to say thank you to her primary school teacher who pushed her along as a young girl into becoming who she is today.

On 19 April 2021, Wees released "Ghost", part of her debut EP Golden Wings, which was released on 21 May 2021 via Capitol Records. Wees said that "Ghost" was written about letting someone get too close even if you know they can hurt you and about being vulnerable to that person in a way that could essentially destroy your life. Ghost was co-written by Ricardo Muñoz Repko, VVAVES, Nicolas Rebscher, and Patrick Salmy.

In January 2025, Wees released "Traitor", the first new solo song in two years.

== Musical style and influences ==
Wees noted that she listened to Jessie J and Miley Cyrus as she grew up. Artists that she cited as influences include Jessie J and Lewis Capaldi. She describes her genre as pop.

== Discography ==
=== Studio albums ===
List of albums, showing selected details
| Title | Details | Peak chart positions | | |
| Title | Details | GER | AUT | SWI |
|---|---|---|---|---|
| Therapy | Released: 3 November 2023; Label: Valeria Music, Capitol; Formats: CD, LP, Digital download, streaming | 15 | 43 | 12 |

=== Extended plays ===
List of extended plays, with selected details
| Title | Details | Peak chart positions | |
| Title | Details | GER | SWI |
|---|---|---|---|
| Golden Wings | Released: 21 May 2021; Label: Valeria Music, Capitol; Formats: Digital download, streaming | 31 | 28 |
| Therapy (Acoustic Version) | Released: 4 December 2023; Label: Valeria Music, Capitol; Formats: Digital download, streaming | — | — |
"—" denotes a recording that did not chart or was not released.

=== Singles ===
==== As lead artist ====
| Title | Year | Peak chart positions | | | | | | | | | | Certifications | Album |
| Title | Year | GER | AUT | BEL (FL) | BEL (WA) | FRA | NLD | SWE | SWI | UK | US | Certifications | Album |
|---|---|---|---|---|---|---|---|---|---|---|---|---|---|
| "Control" | 2020 | 31 | 28 | 6 | 3 | 22 | 63 | — | 11 | — | — (Note: "Control" did not enter the Billboard Hot 100, but peaked at number 6 on the Bubbling Under Hot 100 Singles chart, which acts as an extension to the Hot 100.) | BVMI: Platinum; BPI: Platinum; BRMA: Gold; GLF: Platinum; IFPI SWI: 3× Platinum; RIAA: Platinum; SNEP: Diamond | Golden Wings |
| "Girls Like Us" | 2021 | 9 | 10 | 34 | — | 51 | — | 65 | 3 | — | — | BVMI: Platinum; IFPI SWI: Gold; SNEP: Platinum; RIAA: Gold | Golden Wings |
| "Ghost" | 2021 | — | — | — | — | — | — | — | — | — | — | | Golden Wings |
| "Hold Me Like You Used To" | 2021 | — | — | — | — | — | — | — | — | — | — | | Golden Wings |
| "That's How It Goes" (featuring 6lack) | 2021 | — | — | — | — | — | — | — | — | — | — | | Therapy |
| "Lonely" | 2022 | — | — | — | — | — | — | — | — | — | — | | Non-album single |
| "Third Wheel" | 2022 | — | — | — | — | — | — | — | — | — | — | | Therapy |
| "Daddy's Eyes" | 2022 | — | — | — | — | — | — | — | — | — | — | | Therapy |
| "All I Want (For Christmas)" | 2022 | 40 | — | — | — | — | — | — | — | 64 | — | | Non-album single |
| "Don't Give Up" | 2023 | — | — | — | — | — | — | — | — | — | — | | Therapy |
| "Lightning" | 2023 | — | — | — | — | — | — | — | — | — | — | | Therapy |
| "Sorry for the Drama" | 2023 | — | — | — | — | — | — | — | — | — | — | | Therapy |
| "Never Be Lonely" (with Jax Jones) | 2024 | 44 | — | — | — | — | — | — | — | 41 | — | BPI: Silver | TBA |
| "Mountains" (with Jonas Blue and Galantis) | 2024 | — | — | — | — | — | — | — | — | — | — | | TBA |
| "Traitor" | 2025 | — | — | — | — | — | — | — | — | — | — | | TBA |
| "Learn to Love" (with Dean Lewis) | 2025 | — | — | — | — | — | — | — | — | — | — | | TBA |
| "Dead to Me" | 2025 | — | — | — | — | — | — | — | — | — | — | | TBA |
"—" denotes a recording that did not chart or was not released.

==== As featured artist ====
| Title | Year | Peak chart positions | | | | Certifications | Album |
| Title | Year | GER | AUT | SWE | SWI | Certifications | Album |
|---|---|---|---|---|---|---|---|
| "Hibernating" (Moonbootica featuring Zoe Wees) | 2019 | — | — | — | — | | Non-album single |
| "Wait for You" (Tom Walker featuring Zoe Wees) | 2020 | — | — | — | — | | I Am |
| "Love Me Now" (Kygo featuring Zoe Wees) | 2021 | 69 | 62 | 17 | 28 | GLF: Platinum; IFPI AUT: Gold | Thrill of the Chase |
| "Do It Better" (Felix Jaehn featuring Zoe Wees) | 2022 | 69 | — | — | — | IFPI AUT: Gold | Non-album singles |
| "At Your Worst" (Calum Scott featuring Zoe Wees) | 2022 | — | — | — | — | | Non-album singles |
| "AM to PM" (Robin Schulz and Sigala featuring Zoe Wees) | 2025 | — | — | — | — | | TBA |
"—" denotes a recording that did not chart or was not released.

== Awards and nominations ==
| Year | Award | Nomination | Work | Result | Ref. |
|---|---|---|---|---|---|
| 2020 | New Faces Awards Music (Bunte) | Newcomer | Herself | Won | |
| 2020 | Bravo Otto Awards | Newcomer/Breakthrough | Herself | Gold | |
| 2020 | 1LIVE Krone Awards | Best Newcomer Act | Herself | Nominated | |
| 2020 | 1LIVE Krone Awards | Best Single | Control | Nominated | |
| 2020 | NRJ Music Awards | Newcomer of the Year | Herself | Nominated | |
| 2020 | New Music Awards | Newcomer of the Year | Herself | Won | |
| 2021 | Nickelodeon Kids' Choice Awards | Favourite Musician (DE, AT, CH) | Herself | Nominated | |
| 2021 | Nickelodeon Kids' Choice Awards | Favourite Song (DE, AT, CH) | Control | Nominated | |
| 2021 | MTV Europe Music Awards | Best German Act | Herself | Nominated | |
| 2021 | Bravo Otto Awards | Singer International | Herself | Nominated | |
| 2021 | 1LIVE Krone Awards | Best Female Artist | Herself | Nominated | |
| 2021 | 1LIVE Krone Awards | Best Single | Girls Like Us | Nominated | |
| 2022 | NAACP Image Awards | Outstanding New Artist | Herself | Nominated | |
| 2022 | Nickelodeon Kids' Choice Awards | Favourite Musician (DE, AT, CH) | Herself | Nominated | |
| 2022 | Nickelodeon Kids' Choice Awards | Favourite Song (DE, AT, CH) | Girls Like Us | Won | |
| 2022 | 1LIVE Krone Awards | Favourite Female Act | Herself | Nominated | |
| 2022 | 1LIVE Krone Awards | Best Dance Song | Do It Better (with Felix Jaehn) | Won | |
| 2023 | Radio Regenbogen Awards | National Artist of 2022 | Herself | Won | |
| 2023 | Nickelodeon Kids' Choice Awards | Favourite Musician (DE, AT, CH) | Herself | Nominated | |
