= List of Danger Force episodes =

Danger Force is an American comedy television series developed by Christopher J. Nowak (Note: Christopher J. Nowak is credited as the series creator for the first five episodes, while Dan Schneider and Dana Olsen are the credited creators for the rest of the series.) that premiered on Nickelodeon on March 28, 2020. The series is a spinoff of Henry Danger and includes returning stars Cooper Barnes and Michael D. Cohen. Starring alongside them are Havan Flores, Terrence Little Gardenhigh, Dana Heath, and Luca Luhan.

== Series overview ==
| Season | Episodes | Originally released | |
| Season | Episodes | First released | Last released |
|---|---|---|---|
| 1 | 26 | March 28, 2020 | July 17, 2021 |
| 2 | 25 | October 23, 2021 | July 7, 2022 |
| 3 | 12 | April 20, 2023 | February 21, 2024 |

== Episodes ==
=== Season 1 (2020–21) ===
| No. overall | No. in season | Title | Directed by | Written by | Original release date | Prod. code | U.S. viewers (millions) |
|---|---|---|---|---|---|---|---|
| 1 | 1 | "The Danger Force Awakens" | Mike Caron | Christopher J. Nowak | March 28, 2020 | 101 | 0.89 |
It has been three weeks since Captain Man and Kid Danger have defeated Drex. With Henry now operating in Dystopia, Captain Man and Schwoz open up the Swellview Academy of the Gifted where they get Chapa, Miles, Mika, and Bose as their students ever since they were exposed to the energies of the Omega Weapon. Schwoz has been teaching the children the LIE (lying is everything) to conceal their secret identity. After a comical drill, the Danger Force learns that Swellview is in the middle of a crime drought. When Captain Man is called somewhere, he claims that he is visiting them as a way to fight crime. Later that night, Captain Man zaps the different news people to keep the Danger Force about stopping the theft of a goat who says "but." The Danger Force figures out that Captain Man has been lying about the crime drought. Due to the accusations of lying, Captain Man does another cover-up as he goes to prevent a kid named Crank and his two followers from freeing their grandfather from Swellview Prison so that he can get the money he owes Crank. The Danger Force teleports to Swellview Prison where they try to help fight the bad guys. Due to the Danger Force have not yet controlled their powers and Mika's sonic scream manifesting, they mess up in the first battle and accidentally free Toddler, Frankini, Goomer, Beekeeper, Dr. Minyak, Jeff, Time Jerker, Jack Frittleman, the Thumb Buddies, and other prisoners from Swellview Prison. Danger Force agrees with Captain Man that they need more training. Guest stars: Frankie Grande as Frankini, Carrie Barrett as Mary, Nakia Burrise as Angela, Antonio D. Charity as Herman, Jonathan Chase as Brian Bender, Ben Giroux as Toddler, Ryan Grassmeyer as Jeff, Zoran Korach as Goomer, Jim Mahoney as Joey, Alec Mapa as Jack Frittleman, Mike Ostroski as Dr. Minyak, Arnie Pantoja as Mark, Joey Richter as Time Jerker, Winston Story as Trent
| 2 | 2 | "Say My Name" | Adam Weissman | Jake Farrow | April 4, 2020 | 103 | 0.69 |
Captain Man explains to Trent and Mary about the incident at Swellview Prison that freed the prisoners like Arson Boy, Lil' Moustache, Big Moustache, Midnight Tickler, Mr. Nice Guy, Trenchfoot, Sue Nami, White Collar, and Mr. Guilty. He also introduces the Danger Force who have not found any of the escaped villains yet. Chapa, Mika, Miles, and Bose have been referred to as Spicy Milk, Oopsie Girl, Wing Wimp, and Gorgeous Hair Boy when the disastrous interview goes viral. They want to be referred to as Volt, AWOL, ShoutOut, and Brainstorm. Schwoz states if the news uses their dumb name three times, it will stick. Captain Man stated that he got his name said three times thanks to a DJ named Coyote Jake. Their first attempt to get their right names said is to get a toddler that Bose mistook for Toddler named Ellis back to his parents. Mika and Miles go to Hip Hop Puree to meet a vlogger named Natalie Mazdah who sat on the same airplane that Emma Watson rode where they plan to get her to say the names of their superhero forms three times. When the Danger Force tries to get her to say their name, Hip Hop Pureee is visited by the Toddler and his henchmen. As their powers have not been perfected, the Danger Force struggles to defeat the Toddler and his men until they use spicy milk on them. After the Toddler flees, Ellis' dads arrive to pick up Ellis who calls the Danger Force by their real superhero names. Natalie does a viral video as Trent and Mary finally say the names three times which pleases the Danger Force. Guest stars: Carrie Barret as Mary, Brandon Claybon as Dustan, Ben Giroux as Toddler, Leslie Korein as Fran, Sophie Michelle as Natalie Mazda, Winston Story as Trent
| 3 | 3 | "Captain Mayonnaise" "Ray Goes Cray" | Evelyn Belasco | Samantha Martin | April 11, 2020 | 102 | 0.65 |
Sharona Shapen arrives at the Swellview Academy of the Gifted where is she now working for Swellview as a school inspector after being fired from her teaching job at Swellview Junior High. In order to get a license to run the school, she wants to see all types of education or she will shut it down. The next day, Shapen watches the education and rates every lesson. After passing, Shapen gets them two new students she found at a bus stop due to a shortage of entries at the local gifted school. Schwoz finds a loophole in which they can get the students to leave on their own if it is miserable. The next day, Shapen arrives with the children, Percy and Miriam, who are sweet. Chapa states Percy and Miriam will affect their response to criminal activity. Early the next morning, Captain Man and Danger Force come in after a night of crime-fighting. As Ray did not get any sleep, Schwoz warns them that he will turn bad if he does not get enough sleep. This causes Ray to plot to use a mayonnaise container filled with flesh-eating bacteria at them. The Danger Force work to keep Percy and Miriam safe from an exhausted Ray. The mayonnaise container breaks on Ray as Shapen comes in after obtaining an opening in a Bordertown school for poor gifted children. As she takes Percy and Miriam away, Shapen states that the school can keep its license as she will not send any other children here. Miles stated that the solution provided itself as Mika had been the one who filled out the applications for them. Guest stars: Jill Benjamin as Miss Shapen, Jacob Ferry as Percy, Glory Joy Rose as Miriam
| 4 | 4 | "Villains' Night" | Michael D. Cohen | Andrew Thomas | April 18, 2020 | 104 | 0.77 |
Captain Man reads down the crimes as Danger Force retaliates when they hear that somebody stole books from the Swellview Library except for the books written by Captain Man. Shout-Out states that they can disguise themselves as villains in order to infiltrate Villains' Night at The Beating Dungeon to see if any of them stole the library books. Schwoz provides them with villainous disguises to infiltrate The Beating Dungeon. Captain Man becomes Hawkfist, Volt becomes El Stabbador, AWOL becomes Weird Beard, ShoutOut becomes Mangler, and Brainstorm becomes a Yerban Santa Claus. The Butcher hosts Villains' Night at The Beating Dungeon. The incognito Danger Force talks to each of the villains like Kyle, Lawn Ranger, the Lizard Twins, Betty Blades, Butcher, Doug the Thug, and Marselles where some of them have no knowledge of them until they came across Book Thievin' Steven who burns and shreds them instead of reading them. ShoutOut gives herself away when she screams at Book-Thievin' Steven for what he does to the books as the villains converge on her. Captain Man as Hawkfist uses a doughnut to fake a bleeding to take her down until Betty Blades identifies the blood as raspberry jelly which disappointed the villains. The rest of Danger Force gives themselves away as Ray sneaks off to become Captain Man in order to fight the villains. Captain Man and Danger Force fight the villains and defeat the villains as Book-Thievin' Steven is apprehended. At Volt's suggestion, Captain Man tortures Book-Thievin' Steven by reading all the chapters of his book. Guest star: Jason Gibbs as Lawn Ranger
| 5 | 5 | "Mime Games" | Russ Reinsel | Sam Becker | April 25, 2020 | 105 | 0.74 |
Captain Man and Danger Force are going to Paris because Captain Man's French counterpart Monsieur Man is on strike until someone buys him a pink motorcycle. Because of this, they have to cover for Monsieur Man in protecting France's national treasures until Monsieur Man returns to his job. As Danger Force rush to their Goober Lux, Bose is accidentally left behind in the fortified Man Nest. The national treasures they have to guard are Napoleon's Pants, the original French bread, and the original helmets worn by Daft Punk. Captain Man finds that Bose was left behind and that Schwoz came along in order to find love in Paris. Finding Brainstorm alone, Toddler takes advantage of this. In addition, Goomer is working for him so that he can make Frankini jealous enough to take him back. Back in Paris, Captain Man and Danger Force stop a mime artist from making off with the original French bread. To get the mime artist cooperate, ShoutOut plays along with the mime artist. Entering the Man Nest, Toddler tries to call the news as Bose's destroyed stuffed animal Boom Boom Pew-Pew tries to tell him to turn on the security system. After the mime artist's performance, Monsieur Man mocks them as the mime group that Captain Man suspected to have been associated with the mime with them arrive. Danger Force breaks free as Captain Man fights the Mime Queen as they fight off the mimes. Monsieur Man goes back to work when he finally gets his pink motorcycle. Bose finally activates the security system to trap Toddler and Goomer. Back in France, the mimes are trapped at the cost of France's national treasures while Schwoz finally found a love interest for a few minutes as they take their leave from France. Guest stars: Carrie Barrett as Mary, Ben Giroux as Toddler, Zoran Korach as Goomer, Winston Story as Trent
| 6 | 6 | "Quaran-kini" | Mike Caron | Christopher J. Nowak | May 9, 2020 | 999 | 0.68 |
Trent and Mary cover the news via Zoom about a way-too natural gas leak from the nearby Bhutt Factory happens in Swellview causing everyone to stay at home under Vice-Mayor Willard's orders. Its current owner Harold Bhutt stated that an intruder was responsible. Even Danger Force is setting a good example as they do things to await the quarantine to be lifted with Chapa not being able to do anything with her phone still stolen. Ray starts to go crazy waiting for Schwoz to get back from Canada to get the Whaler's Choice Luscious Hair Quarterly as he is down to his last bottle. On Day 3, Bose watches TV claiming that he can learn things from it as Chapa tries to teach everyone her Clik-Clok dance while Miles works on an Envygram. Ray holds a meeting with Danger Force as Schwoz contacts them. Ray gets his Punch-Through Screen and becomes Captain Man to interrogate whatever villain he contacts to find out who was responsible. Toddler shows his viewers how to make a quarantine mask out of a diaper until he is contacted by Captain Man who uses the Punch-Through Screen on him to see if he leaked the gas. Toddler claims that someone else did it. Dr. Minyak is selling stuff online as he is contacted by Captain Man and Toddler with the latter states he originally smelled it. Captain Man then uses his Punch-Through Screen to beat up Toddler and Minyak. Danger Force is advised to transform and contact every criminals on line. Donning their quarantine items, Danger Force makes contact with Frankini who reveals that he leaked the gas from the Bhutt Factory while waiting for them to figure out he did it because he wanted to be in a celebrity uplifting music video where people perform it are in a state of despair. Captain Man joins the contact and learns of Frankini's motives. This leads to a music video performance of "This Gas Will Pass" done by Captain Man, Danger Force, Frankini, and Schwoz. Afterwards, Frankini does his part of the deal by meeting Captain Man at the Bhutt Factory to close up the gas leak while everyone does the Clik-Clok dance. Guest stars: Frankie Grande as Frankini, Carrie Barret as Mary, Ben Giroux as Toddler, Mike Ostroski as Dr. Minyak, Winston Story as Trent
| 7 | 7 | "Chapa's Crush" | David Kendall | Jessica Poter | August 1, 2020 | 106 | 0.71 |
Captain Man and Danger Force have been incapacitated by a bag-wearing criminal who robs Nacho Ball. Despite her arms being free, Volt is unable to zap the criminal. At the Man's Nest, Captain Man reprimands Danger Force for their screw up as Shout-Out, AWOL, and Brainstorm talk about why Volt has been acting weird. Schwoz secretly obtained a hair from Chapa's brush and reveals that she has a crush on someone. Mika states that Chapa has been going to Hip Hop Puree for the last three days with the receipts being from a cashier named Creston Chestwell. To prove that he has friends, Ray goes to look for someone named Kunka who he claims is a friend. When Mika goes to Hip Hop Puree, she meets Creston, gets attracted to him and surprises Chapa. Miles and Bose also get attracted to Creston's handsome appearance. Mika states to Chapa that she cannot use her abilities if she is in "like-like" as they start to compete for his attention. Captain Man finds an adult Kunka, who turns out to be the bag-wearing criminal Takeout and starts to rob Nacho Ball. Because of this, Danger Force leaves stating to Creston that they'll be back at 9:30. Danger Force arrives and defeats Takeout. Later that night, Trent reports that Creston has moved to Neighborville much to the Danger Force's dismay. The Man's Nest is suddenly visited by Henry Hart who asks when Schwoz had the time to build the Man's Nest. Guest stars: Jace Norman as Henry Hart, Carrie Barret as Mary, Jax Kemp as Creston, Boone Platt as Take-Out / Kunka, Winston Story as Trent
| 8 | 8 | "Return of the Kid" | Mike Caron | Jake Farrow | November 7, 2020 | 109 | 0.59 |
Henry has returned from Dystopia to visit Ray. As Ray catches up with him, Danger Force is left to deal with a brawl at the nail salon, a fight between the fire bees and murder bears, and dealing with a criminal at an aquarium. After those missions, Danger Force starts to complain about how they've been answering their calls form. Captain Man and Henry go to deal with Jeff who is robbing the How Convenient Store. After thwarting the robbery, they are bound by a high-tech drone. It turns out that Henry has been eluding the bounty hunter Blackout who is planning to eat Henry's soul and was previously mentioned in the texts that Henry received from Charlotte. Blackout shows up and knocks out Captain Man. Following a convincing, Danger Force shows up where they fall on Blackout and turn on the lights. Henry is persuaded by Danger Force to help take down Blackout. The next day, Schwoz finishes Henry's laundry and left a surprise in his pants as Henry compliments Ray's training of Danger Force as they have been promised the puppies in exchange for rescuing Ray and Henry. Guest stars: Jace Norman as Henry, Ryan Grassmeyer as Jeff
| 9 | 9 | "Mika in the Middle" | Mike Caron | Nathan Knetchel | November 14, 2020 | 108 | 0.33 |
Ray asks Danger Force about why the Man-Truck is at the bottom of the river. Mika cracks under pressure stating that they got food from Nacho Bell and Miles teleported it into the river by mistake. Ray wants to see if Mika can tell a lie as she has snitched five times. If she snitches again, Ray will add the final word to "snitch" and he will have Mika wear the white-colored shoes of shame for a week which he considers the ugliest shoes. Schwoz is then visited by his nephew Ned who gives him a message can from his mom that she has melty bones and wants Schwoz to come home. Ray will not let Schwoz go as he needs him and he already used up his sick days. This causes Danger Force to think of a way to help Schwoz. The next day, Ray finds that Mama Schwoz is in the Man Cave after Miles teleported her into the cave much to his dismay due to her body-shaming him. During superhero school, Schwoz criticizes Ray's teaching. While everyone goes to deal with a crime, Mika discovers that Schwoz does not have melty bones and has no choice but to keep quiet. Captain Man later finds that Schwoz on a mission to obtain elderly items instead of a mission to return the DVD of Addams Family Values before it becomes overdue. In addition, Schwoz has Chapa bet on a racehorse called Three-Legged Dreamer at Swellview Downs and Bose pick up some golf clubs. The rest of Danger Force continues to serve Schwoz much to the dismay of Ray and Mika. Due to a battle of conscious during the horserace, Mika cracks under pressure and confesses. Schwoz comes clean and states that Ray will not let Schwoz visit him more than once while planning to bring him home. Ray admits that he cannot live without Schwoz. This causes Ray to fight Schwoz for him as she starts to overpower him. Schwoz and Danger Force break up the fight as Schwoz states that he has to go home to be with his mom. Ray is then surprised that Schwoz has returned and sent his clone to take his place. As Mika still snitched, she now has to wear the white shoes of shame. Mika puts them on and sees they are not bad. Guest star: Lisa Schurga as Mama Schwoz
| 10 | 10 | "The Thousand Pranks War: Part I" | Mike Caron | Angela Yarbrough | November 21, 2020 | 110 | 0.44 |
Chapa and Bose work to prank Mika after she reminded Ray to give everyone homework by giving her a water balloon filled with spicy milk that is disguised as an apple. Due to her anticipating the pranks, she outwits them. Ray gives them an assignment to protect Archduke Fernando of Rivalton who is coming to Swellview to do a Kielbasa Day speech. An important instruction is to not make fun of his ponytail as ShoutOut detects a prank. They work to protect Archduke Fernando from the pranks to no avail where Brainstorm accidentally rips off his ponytail "Gideon." Ray reprimands Danger Force for this mishap and shows them the Thousand Pranks War documentary which was made by Ken Burns to detail the titular event between Swellview and Rivalton. Chapa appears following a prank involving a spitting attack as the prank war has officially reignited. Trent and Mary comment about the prank stores are selling out. Mika comes up with an idea to prank Rivalton that involves tampering with Hee Haw Puree. After the prank is successfully installed, Danger Force watches the footage of the pranks going off. The next day, Danger Force finds that someone swapped his cashew butter with fast-locking glue and that they will have no other choice but to shave his hair off. To remedy this, Schwoz gives Ray a Kid Danger wig that he made following their historic fight with the Barber who butchered Kid Danger's hair. Ray suspects that someone in the Man Cave has sided with Rivalton and assisted in their pranks by accessing his hair products. With Ray obtaining the confidential file from Schwoz, Miles admits that their mother Angela was pregnant at the time when their father Herman had a large puree and she gave birth to Mika on the Rivalton side while Miles was born on the Swellview side of the Jandy River. Mika rants that she did not touch his products as Ray kicks Mika out of the Man's Nest until the prank war is over. Mika takes her leave and meets with Archduke Fernando to prank for Rivalton while returning Gideon to him. Guest stars: Carrie Barret as Mary, Nakia Burrise as Angela, Antonio D. Charity as Herman, Joe Gillette as Archduke Fernando, Gabrielle Nevaeh Green as Maddie, Rashhaun Sibley as Clarence, Winston Story as Trent
| 11 | 11 | "The Thousand Pranks War: Part II" | Mike Caron | Angela Yarbrough | November 28, 2020 | 111 | 0.56 |
Now that Shout-Out is playing for Rivalton, the pranks have intensified. To prove herself to Archduke Fernando, ShoutOut pranks Bose with the peanut can trick. Schwoz is instructed by Ray to drop the Big Sudsy soap warhead on Rivalton in order to target their grease supply. As Miles builds a brick wall to separate his side of his room from Mika's side, Bose warns Mika about what Ray plans to do with Rivalton as Mika counters Miles' spicy pudding attack. Captain Man plans to have AWOL sneak him and Big Sudsy into Rivalton only to reach a complication when it turns out that AWOL might have a spicy pudding allergy. In Rivalton, ShoutOut learns that Archduke Fernando has made a lot of money while mentioning what Captain Man plans to do with the Rivalton's grease supply. Shout-Out states that they can save their grease supply to the boarder. Captain Man and the rest of Danger Force arrive as part of ShoutOut's prank. She then reveals that she has an envelope that revealed that Archduke Fernando pranked himself due to him owning Sassy G's Prank Supply and not making any money when the prank war was dying down. A flashback revealed that Mika and Chapa had a double agent plan. Volt then ignites Rivalton's grease supply and has Brainstorm use Big Sudsy on the fire in exchange for the signing of the treaty to end the prank war. Archduke Fernando reluctantly signs the peace treaty as Volt sets off Big Sudsy. The documentary claims that Captain Man was one of the people to take the credit. Schwoz reveals that he was the one who switched the cashew butter with fast-locking glue as Ray attacks Schwoz. Guest stars: Joe Gillette as Archduke Fernando, Gabrielle Nevaeh Green as Maddie, Rashhaun Sibley as Clarence
| 12 | 12 | "Down Goes Santa: Part I" | Mike Caron | Nathan Knetchel | December 12, 2020 | 112 | 0.51 |
Two days before Christmas, Chapa states to the other Danger Force members that they have not done anything Christmas-related as Chapa is obsessed with Christmas. They do all the Christmas-related stuff until Ray appears. He tells the real story of Christmas from a book he bought at the Truth Store stating that Mother Nature and Father Time got married and gave birth to Santa Claus and Krampus. Krampus' activities landed him on the naughty list for 1,000 years, during which he ran away and moved to a desert outside of San Bernardino, California. They fought a duel until Santa Claus defeated Krampus and locked him in a clothing store called Punk Function. On Christmas Eve, Schwoz invites Santa Claus to the Man's Nest as Schwoz reveals to Mika, Miles, and Chapa that he tunes up his sleigh that has a positron fuel injector. While the others go to get corn from the Corn Lady, Captain Man and Volt find the Man's Nest decorated as they find the P.A.N.T.S. are down as a flying object is approaching the Man's Nest. As Volt goes outside, she attacks the flying object only to discover too late that its Santa Claus' sleigh. As a side-effect of the attack, Krampus escapes from his prison. Schwoz, Mika, Miles, and Bose return and learn what happened that involves Santa Claus having amnesia. Captain Man instructs Schwoz to find a way to get Santa Claus' memory back as they find that he escaped and is running around Swellview not knowing who he is. Krampus then arrives at the Man's Nest to look for Santa Claus so that he can destroy him and Christmas forever. Krampus starts by tricking Bose into touching him so that he can make him bad in his search for Santa Claus. The news reports that Santa's magic bag fell on two dirty kids causing Captain Man and Volt to retrieve it while AWOL and Shout-Out go looking for Santa Claus and Schwoz looks for Bose. Krampus crashes the interview with Percy and Miriam as Captain Man and Volt arrive to claim the magic bag. Krampus also touches Percy, Miriam, Trent, and Mary as part of Krampus' plans to make nobody like Christmas. After being struck down by Volt, Krampus prepares to make more people hate Christmas. Guest stars: Carrie Barrett as Mary, Jacob Ferry as Percy, Jonathan Goldstein as Santa, Kurt Quinn as Krampus, Glory Joy Rose as Miriam, Winston Story as Trent
| 13 | 13 | "Down Goes Santa: Part II" | Mike Caron | Sam Becker | December 18, 2020 | 113 | 0.48 |
As Captain Man and Volt reclaim Santa's bag, Shout-Out and AWOL continue to look for Santa Claus as they follow up on a sighting at Hip Hop Puree where a Santa-themed party is at. They can only get in dressed as Santa Claus as Fran mentions. Meanwhile, Schwoz works to repair Santa's sleigh and uses a candy cane to purify Bose while performing a Christmas song. The magic of Christmas fixes Santa's sleigh the moment Bose hands Schwoz a wrench. Captain Man and Volt arrive with Santa's sleigh. Dressed as Santa Claus, ShoutOut and AWOL continue to look for Santa Claus and find him operating as the DJ at the Santa-themed party. Krampus crashes the party as AWOL evacuates Santa Claus to the Man's Nest. Krampus catches up to Schwoz, Volt, and Bose and makes off with Santa Claus, his magic bag, and his sleigh. With Santa stashed away at an unknown location, Krampus begins to corrupt everyone as Danger Force works to locate Santa Claus. Thanks to Captain Man's book, Captain Man and Danger Force track Santa Claus to Punk Function so that they can confront Krampus on his turf. As Danger Force fights Krampus, Captain Man works to untie Santa Claus. Krampus overpowers Danger Force leaving Captain Man left to fight him. Fran ends up getting to Krampus, who is revealed to hate Christmas because he could not get a jet ski from Father Time. Danger Force persuades Captain Man to give up the jet ski to him. He reluctantly does so and Krampus loses his demonic appearance. With Santa Claus still having amnesia and Krampus having not spoken to Father Time for years, Danger Force works to deliver all the presents while undoing Krampus' corruption on his victims. Afterwards, Danger Force finishes reading the story of their events while Captain Man rides a jet ski with Santa Claus and Krampus. Guest stars: Carrie Barrett as Mary, Jacob Ferry as Percy, Jonathan Goldstein as Santa, Leslie Korein as Fran, Kurt Quinn as Krampus, Glory Joy Rose as Miriam, Winston Story as Trent
| 14 | 14 | "Vidja Games" | Evelyn Belasco | Andrew Thomas | January 23, 2021 | 114 | 0.41 |
At the Man's Nest, Volt has been doing a Howdee greeting video instead of going with Ray and the rest of Danger Force on an apple-picking trip. While Ray goes to take a bath, Volt introduces Mika, Miles, and Bose to Howdee where they send money to whoever makes out the videos to anyone. This causes Mika, Miles, and Bose to work on their Howdee videos to earn money. Even Schwoz is on Howdee as "Cupid" which he used to pay off his student debts. Captain Man becomes part of Howdee when he finds that his rival Joey Lawrence is on it while on the top part of Howdee's leaderboard. After a montage, Ray accidentally sent a video that revealed all the identities of Captain Man and Danger Force that Volt was making out to Mary Gaperman. Volt finds that the video goes to the Howdee Server Farm run by Maw and Paw Howdee as Captain Man leads Danger Force to the Howdee Server Farm to get to the video which is being uploaded by the computer cow Bessie. Though Maw and Paw will not let them reclaim the embarrassing video as they want them to do something for them as Captain Man and Danger Force are too full on Howdee farm's buttermilk which prevented them from doing their powers. The job they want Captain Man and Danger Force to do is to get Joey Lawrence to return their calls. Captain Man reluctantly makes the call to Joey Lawrence while Danger Force use this diversion to tip Bessie. Miles comes up with a competition to get Mika to tip it, in which she accepts. As she made it to her feet, she felt bloated from all the buttermilk she drank. Mika held her hands against her belly and unleashed a long buttermilk powered super belch right toward Bessie. Mika's super belch was powerful enough to tip over Bessie to erase their video and destroy the server. Afterwards Captain Man negotiated with Joey Lawrence to be the piñata at his daughter's 5th birthday party when he finds that Bessie was tipped. As Captain Man is left to uphold his promise to be the piñata, Joey Lawrence emerges from the bathroom and takes his turn hitting Captain Man. Special guest star: Joey Lawrence as Joey Lawrence Guest stars: Nakia Burrise as Angela, Antonio D. Charity as Herman, Brooks Anne Hayes as Ma Howdee, Sophie Michelle as Natalie Mazda, Winston Story as Trent, Harrison White as Paw Howdee
| 15 | 15 | "Test Friends" | Elvira Ibragimova | Samantha Martin | January 30, 2021 | 115 | 0.57 |
Captain Man, Danger Force, and Schwoz work on the laundry and complete it. Captain Man gets a call from his agent that he has been given an opportunity to be on the cover of the superhero magazine Supes Illustrated as Danger Force wants to be on the cover as well. Captain Man states that he'll think about it. Sending Danger Force to the restaurant Abbrev, Captain Man states to Schwoz that Danger Force plan to steal his cover opportunity from him. He plans to give them a series of tests to see whether or not he can trust them. The next day, Ray gives them a surprise test and sees if anyone will see look at the unattended answers which Bose eats. Ray states that he will have to make the tests harder much Schwoz's dismay. The next test is the trust fall where he sees who can catch him. Bose catches him while the others place pillows under him. Ray decides to test Danger Force individually. He tempted Miles with ice cream, posed as Bose from the future to destroy Captain Man who is said to become evil in the future, made Mika listen to a brief speech, and contacted Chapa to let her know not to post an embarrassing picture on Instagram. They each pass their tests with Bose starting to rescue animals from the petting zoo. Mika tells Bose that Ray called him about the prank as Danger Force gets a confession from Schwoz who also mentions their laundry level is at 100. Ray contacts them stating that his foot is stuck in a gopher hole in the desert as Mika states that they will not pleased with being tested and thinks that they are still being tested while being hanged up. Later on, Danger Force thanks Miles for going thirty days without ice cream as Ray has not returned. One week later, Ray contacts Danger Force, stating that he is still trapped and feeding off of scorpion hornets. Mika wants Ray to apologize to Danger Force first which he does and costs him a shot on the cover of Supes Illustrated. After Miles teleports the photographer to New York City, Ray returns as he learns that he missed the photoshoot. Volt puts an embarrassing photo of Captain Man on the cover which makes Ray half-pleased with it.
| 16 | 16 | "Lil' Dynomite" | Evelyn Belasco | Jake Farrow | February 6, 2021 | 116 | 0.61 |
After taking down a Chest Monster that was eating swans on Swellview Lake, Danger Force answers messages from Lil' Dynomite from Neighborville and then goes to a Court & Courtney concert instead of going to a movie with Ray since his best events end with sadness. The next day, Danger Force arrive to find Captain Man making his pancakes called Man-Flaps and learn that Captain Man has taken up Lil' Dynomite's offer to join the Danger Force. Lil' Dynomite states to become the assistant of Captain Man and starts to do things with him like teaching Captain Man how to play the keytar for the Battle for the Bands in a competition with The Weeknd, making Lil' Dynomite the Sheriff of Danger Force, and giving Shout-Out's locker to Lil' Dynomite. The next day, Danger Force hears about a core meltdown at the nearest Swellview Nuclear Power Plant where they bring Lil' Dynomite with them as Captain Man is looking for the eggs of the endangered split-feather condor. Lil' Dynomite goes into the core to deactivate the core. As Danger Force hooks Lil' Dynomite to the healing suit, Captain Man hears about what happened to Lil' Dynomite and is saddened. Then Captain Man and Danger Force argue over whose fault it was. Due to Captain Man dodging Volt's attacks, Lil' Dynomite is hit and is revived. When contacted by Schwoz, they learn that the healing suit is actually a power suit that actually gives superpowers where he starts to get radioactive. Hearing Captain Man's taunting, Lil' Dynomite starts to react to it and starts to use his new powers. Danger Force starts to get in between them where they agree on some facts about Captain Man. AWOL then teleports Lil' Dynomite to the other side of Mount Swellview. Due to the power suit having jet boots, Lil' Dynomite briefly returns and states that he will one day return to take revenge on Captain Man when Danger Force is not there. Guest stars: Carrie Barrett as Mary, Mitchell Berg as Lil' Dynomite, Winston Story as Trent
| 17 | 17 | "Monsty" | Russ Reinsel | Nick Dossman & Shamar Michael Curry | February 20, 2021 | 118 | 0.29 |
While cooking sausages, Mika comes up looking for meat while waring strange clothes. Suspecting that Mika did a bad thing, Ray, Schwoz, and the rest of Danger Force learn that she was trying to win Man's Nest Employee of the Month which Ray does not have. Also, Ray is assigned to jury duty at the time of the STFCOUPWOLTKEOPOHCAD (short for Swellview Telethon for Children of Unchill Parents Who Only Let Their Kids Eat One Piece of Halloween Candy a Day) that is hosted by TV personality Danny Chest. This led to Mika to make a clone of Ray using Schwoz' cloning machine and Ray's DNA taken from the short ribs he ate where it created Tiny Ray who destroyed the cloning machine. She then went on to use Schwoz' antiques to clone Ray the old-fashioned way which resulted in the creation of Monsty. Ray wants to Danger Force to dispose of Monsty. When the charity begins, it is not pulling in a lot of money. This causes Danny Chest to go into a plan to trap Captain Man and Danger Force in their chairs and launch off of Mount Swellview in order to get people to donate money. After receiving a big donation from Jennifer Lawrence, Danny gets more calls as he starts to counter Danger Force's moves. Miles reveals that he did not teleport Monsty to Cavetown and placed him in the Man's Nest Dungeon with Chest Monster who was not dropped off to Barstow. Mika shouts enough to attract Monsty to her. When Monsty is defeated, Danny sees if the chairs works as Volt zaps Monsty who throws the anvil at Danny Chest. Then Monsty grabs the remote and accidentally launches Captain Man off the mountain. Afterwards, Captain Man gives the Employee of the Month award to Monsty which Mika is proud of and orders Bose to get Monsty a ticket to Bordertown. As Ray still has jury duty, he had sent Schwoz to take his place. Guest stars: Antonio D. Charity as Herman, Kevin Railsback as Danny Chest
| 18 | 18 | "Twin It to Win It" | Mike Caron | Christopher J. Nowak | February 27, 2021 | 117 | 0.40 |
Mika and Miles argue over the fast forwarding as Herman comes in stating that someone has stolen the saddle he was using on the horse he was riding with Angela translating his sad language. This causes Mika and Miles to compete on who will find his saddle. At the Man's Nest, Ray is wearing the pink sweatsuits while on a laundry strike due to Schwoz not wanting to do Ray's laundry. Chapa comes up with the idea to have a competition to see who can catch crimes where whoever catches the crimes along the way will get to take a bath in the nice tub when Herman gets out by the time they finish Coyote Weekend where they watch the Jacob's Coyote films. Schwoz helps them out by giving them a special scoreboard to keep score on the busted crimes. Three girls turn themselves in for stealing the fudge causing Miles to get three scores. Schwoz lends Mika the Man Buggy and a retro pair of shades to drive around Swellview in order to find criminals and a lead to the person who stole Herman's saddle. When Coyote Weekend ends, it turns out the cricket interrupting the Coyote movies was the ringtone on Bose's phone. The Swellview Academy of the Gifted is visited by the Swellview Criminal Softball League who are looking for their stolen scoreboard. Miles traps the 30 members in the school which gives him some extra points. At Hip Hop Puree, Mika rants about Miles' victory to Chapa when a woman named Priscilla comes in with a stolen saddle that belongs to Big Herm. Mika changes into ShoutOut and takes down Priscilla and rescues her father's saddle. As both of them argue who will bathe in the tears of their father, she starts boasting to the neighborhood causing Miles, Angela, and Herman to take their leave. Guest stars: Nakia Burrise as Angela, Antonio D. Charity as Herman
| 19 | 19 | "Radioactive Cat" | Evelyn Belasco | Angela Yarbrough | March 6, 2021 | 119 | 0.42 |
At the Swellview Academy for the Gifted, Captain Man puts Danger Force through a door exercise when Schwoz comes in giving everyone iodine vitamins. The school is then approached by Bose's mother Celia O'Brian who thought that Bose left his bag at home as she is corrected that it is her bag. After she leaves, Schwoz admits that he accidentally got an intruding cat that was exposed to radioactive chemicals and he must find it and cure it before it goes nuclear. The cat is found by Celia who plans to take it home and names it Meatball. Danger Force heads out to find the cat and have no luck finding it. Bose receives a text from his mother about the cat she found causing everyone to suspect that it is the cat that was exposed to the cat. While Schwoz works on the antidote, Bose and Miles head to Bose's house where they are unable to convince Celia to give up the cat as she moves Bose into the guest house and states that she has no joy in her life due to her step-husband Vice Mayor Willard being out of town on business a lot. Miles calls in Mika to help out where they are still unable to persuade Celia to give up the cat. Then Ray and Chapa pose as city workers during their attempt where Celia calls up Willard to fire them which he does. The cat starts to glow in Celia's arms. As Schwoz works on the antidote, he also makes an antidote for Celia. Danger Force heads out to cure Mrs. Celia and the cat which starts to break down the door. Volt drives Celia out and ShoutOut subdues Celia so that both of them can be cured. As Mrs. O'Brian chases after the cat, Captain Man drops in with Bigfoot only to learn that Danger Force already did the job as they teleport away. Celia returns with the cat and recognizes Bigfoot where she invites him in for tea. As they enter the house, Bigfoot asks if Captain Man is cool to which Captain Man states that he is not. As Bigfoot puts the door back in place upon entering, Captain Man storms off quoting "What a colossal waste of time!" Guest stars: Timothy Brennan as Vice Mayor Willard V.O., Jesse Mackey as Bigfoot, Siobhan Murphy as Celia
| 20 | 20 | "Miles Has Visions" | Adam Weissman | Sam Becker | March 13, 2021 | 120 | 0.57 |
At the Man's Nest, Schwoz has fallen asleep because he took down discussions that he mentions in the sleep. Miles claims that he has seen some stuff be done before. The next day, Captain Man and Danger Force torture a supposed human/chicken hybrid named Chicken Man about where the hostages are as Miles has seen this before. Captain Man claims that Miles has deja vu as Miles states he had a vision about a bird colliding, Brainstorm spilling sauce on Volt, and Captain Man calling Kim Danvers who states that she is among Chicken Man's hostages. Captain Man then suspects that AWOL can predict the future while claiming that Time Jerker is responsible. ShoutOut claims that Time Jerker left the criminal business and opened and electronic store. At Hooked 'Tronics, Time Jerker is visited by Captain Man and Danger Force where he denies any knowledge about AWOL"s visions even after Captain Man and Danger Force destroy every item in his store. After having some soy chicken nuggets where Chicken Man helped in making them after his plumbing was fixed, AWOL as another set of vision revolving around what happened and Chicken Man getting a text from his landlord about his apartment in East Swellview flooding with sewage. Schwoz reveals an invention that can tell if anyone is messing with time where it says that Time Jerker is not responsible and states that AWOL's mind is projecting in his dreams. Captain Man had to reluctantly apologize to Time Jerker as he Shout-Out states that he can use the other half of his life savings to restore Hooked 'Tronics with Danger Force agreeing to help with the grand re-opening. AWOL has another vision involving a destructive battle as he advises them to leave. Kyle, Takeout, and Mr. Nice Guy then show up to target Time Jerker and planning to bring him back to The Beatin' Dungeon to have a word with the villain community. This results in a fight that happens as AWOL happens. After the battle, Captain Man and Danger Force note that Time Jerker will become a bad guy again as he sadly leaves. As AWOL praises his new superpower, Captain Man suggests that they celebrate with soft pretzels. Guest stars: Carrie Barrett as Mary V.O., Emmanuel Borria as Chicken Man, Girvan "Swirv" Bramble as Kyle, Boone Platt as Take-Out, Brian Palermo as Mr. Nice Guy V.O., Joey Richter as Tim Jerkowski, Winston Story as Trent
| 21 | 21 | "Captain Man Strikes Out" | Mike Caron | Nathan Knetchel | June 12, 2021 | 122 | 0.34 |
At SMOCA, Captain Man and Danger Force are fighting the Pittsburgh Stealer who wants to steal priceless art and bring them to Pittsburgh. After Volt takes out the Pittsburgh Stealer, Captain Man does a victory dance where he accidentally destroys some priceless art. Vice Mayor Willard scolds Captain Man for his actions and all those arts cost a lot of money where he must pay them or else he will rename one of the streets named after Captain Man so that it is named after Joey Lawrence as Willard cannot ban Captain Man from Mom Con because someone beat him to it. Not wanting to pay Willard, Captain Man decides to go on strike and films a pro-crime film directed by Jon Favreau and paid for the Committee Who Loves Captain Man. Not wanting to cave in, Willard announces that he has received Monsieur Man from France to cover for Captain Man until he ends his strike. Due to the Good Guys Guild contract he signed, Captain Man must let Monsieur Man live with him until his strike ends. Monsieur Man starts to outdo Captain Man where he saved Kim Danvers from attacking silver foxes, rescuing people who are too afraid to get off a repaired roller coaster at Dinny, fighting off Toddler's drones, and rescuing Kim Danvers from Cave Kid. When Danger Force and Monsieur Man get captured during a mission at the Whole Lava Lamp factory to stop That 70s Crook, Captain Man comes out of his strike to rescue them where he defeats the criminals. Then he broadcasts to Swellview that he forgives them, he is ending his strike, and will pay the fine because of Danger Force. Captain rescues them by pulling the lever and is burned by the lava which does not harm them and walks off without freeing Monsieur Man and Danger Force. Guest stars: Carrie Barret as Mary, Timothy Brennan as Vice Mayor Willard, Kerby Joe Grubb as Monsieur Man, Winston Story as Trent
| 22 | 22 | "Manlee Men" | Michael D. Cohen | Michael D. Cohen & Andrew Thomas | June 19, 2021 | 125 | 0.36 |
At the Man's Nest, Danger Force is watching a movie about a killer cake when Schwoz comes in with a rock-like plant from his home country. Ray comes in showing the news about twin child reporters Finn and Quinn reporting about the Swellview Fashion Show run by Nana Winter who states that she has some clothing ideas for Captain Man and Danger Force. Chapa reveals that she used to model for Doodie Diapers when she was a baby. Schwoz warns Danger Force not to have Captain Man act like a diva ever since he caused an incident at the 1982 Swellview Fashion Show. As Schwoz states that he'll be in the alias of Captain Man's agent Lefty Schwartz to keep an eye on Ray at the Swellview Cultural Center, Captain Man calls for fashion designer Chunk Manlee to work on him. Danger Force is interviewed by Finn and Quinn. Then Finn and Quinn admit that there is something is up with Chunk Manlee as they claim to Danger Force that Chunk Manlee is not a real fashion designer. As Finn and Quinn is instructed to distract Chunk Manlee, Danger Force sneaks into Chunk Manlee's dressing room to see if the claims about Chuck Manlee are right. They find the real Chunk Manlee tied up in the armoire and states that the imposter is planning revenge on Nana Winter by having Captain Man wearing a shirt with laser buttons on them. Danger Force then heads out to stop Captain Man while neglecting to untie Chunk Manlee. They confront Captain Man and the imposter who sends Captain Man onto the runway while the imposter's henchmen works to keep Danger Force busy. AWOL tries to get Nana Winter out as the fight is brought onto the runway. Captain Man nears the spotlight as Finn and Quinn knock out the spotlight. AWOL saves Nana Winter as an armoire falls on the imposter who is unmasked to be former model Derrick Face who wanted revenge on Captain Man for ruining his face and modeling career as Nana states that Derrick was a terrible model which explained why she never hired him to model again. Back at the Man Cave, Scwhoz's rock grows into a plant. Miles starts modeling now that twins are in as Chapa joins him in some poses. Guest stars: Carrie Barrett as Mary, Natalie R. Cohen as Quinn, Sasha A. Cohen as Finn, Jake Millgard as Chunk Manlee / Real Manlee / Derrick Face, Jessica Pohly as Nana Winter, Winston Story as Trent
| 23 | 23 | "SW.A.G Is Haunted" | Adam Weissman | Angela Yarbrough | June 26, 2021 | 121 | 0.36 |
At the Swellview Academy for the Gifted, days have passed as Danger Force partake in sporting events that go wrong for them as Schwoz does other activities. Upon them asking, Schwoz admits that he is dating an old-time lady and that they must not mention it to Ray or else he would steal her from him. On Thursday, Bose accidentally admits that Schwoz has an old-time girlfriend. Ray puts everything together and confronts Schwoz. He comes clean to Danger Force about Tilda who is a ghost. Ray then slaps Schwoz into a flashback where he had to purchase a school for Henry the day when Henry was stepping down as Kid Danger and he located a haunted school due to lack of schools that are not haunted. Schwoz states that she has a long list of things that she must do before she can pass on to the afterlife. Ray cancels Danger Force's plans until Tilda is removed. Due to Miles being afraid of ghosts, he bails on the assignment and help his dad Herman crank the giant meat carrot for 10 hours. Chapa takes Tilda on a ride on a tandem bicycle. Mika does math problems with Tilda. Tilda tells comedic jokes to Bose who states that she should go on America's Got Talent. After Chapa, Bose, and Schwoz help Tilda chop down and old redwood tree which is the last thing on the list, Tilda states that she has other lists that last until Wednesday. Ray gets fed up and orders Schwoz to turn him into a ghost so that he can temporarily visit the Ghost Realm and deal with Tilda. They end up in a ghost fight where Ray is vulnerable to Tilda's attacks as a side effect of temporarily becoming a ghost. After Tilda defeated Ray, Mika notes that Tilda is adding to her list. Tilda admits that the one thing that is impossible for her to do is eat one of Swellview's meat carrot and that she did not get to eat it because she choked on a dinner role. Remembering what Miles said, Mika persuades Tilda into going to her house as Schwoz comes up with a plan to be liquified and ingested into someone. Mika gives Miles a special drink that enables Tilda to possess him and eat the meat carrot. Once that was done, Tilda passes on to the afterlife which frightens Herman. Danger Force then leaves to partake in a Sunday tattoo event. Guest stars: Antonio D. Charity as Herman, Courtney Hawkins as Tilda
| 24 | 24 | "Family Lies" | Evelyn Belasco | Christopher J. Nowak & Jake Farrow | July 3, 2021 | 123 | 0.31 |
At the Man's Nest, Danger Force is caught in the tentacles of a giant squid that Schwoz tried to cook. Miss Shapen contacts Ray asking him to have a parents' night and would like a photographic proof of it or else she will shut down the Swellview Academy for the Gifted. After being regurgitated by the giant squid, Schwoz starts a month-long science cleanse causing Ray to invite Danger Force's parents. While Mika, Miles, and Bose go to tell their parents, Chapa admits to Schwoz that she does not have a family and she lives at Dinnyland's Haunted Condo ride after hours ever since she left home and lost her phone. Schwoz hires Jake Hart to pose as Chapa for free. On the night of Parents' Night, Angela and Herman arrive while Chapa meets a disguised Jake and Schwoz contends with a captive Cavekid until he runs out of radishes. Ray and the rest of Danger Force became suspicious of Chapa's fake parent until Cavekid escapes. Ray tricks the parents into going on a tour of the school as Shapen calls the Swellview Academy for the Gifted for a status report on the photo. When Ray states that they are working on it, Shapen orders him to work faster. While AWOL drops off Brainstorm to deal with Cavekid, Vice Mayor Willard and Celia arrive causing the others to stall with the other parents get free. After Cavekid is subdued, the parents want to charge Ray money as Ray finally gets everyone together for a photo. As Schwoz starts to take the photo, Chapa's real parents arrive as everyone learns the truth as Jake flees. The lights go off as Cavekid returns and Schwoz takes the photos. The picture impresses Shapen. While roasting radishes, Chapa states that her parents dress like dorks and are happy causing Ray and the rest of Danger Force to admit their parents' flaws. Schwoz comes in stating that he lost Cavekid again. As Ray states that Cavekid is probably halfway back to Cavetown, the lights turn off as Cavekid quotes "Radishes" and goes on the attack. Guest stars: Jill Benjamin as Miss Shapen, Timothy Brennan as Vice Mayor Willard, Jeffrey Nicolas Brown as Jake Hart, Nakia Burrise as Angela, Antonio D. Charity as Herman, Siobhan Murphy as Celia
| 25 | 25 | "Earth to Bose" | Russ Reinsel | Samantha Martin | July 10, 2021 | 124 | 0.37 |
At the Man's Nest, Ray, Chapa, Miles, and Bose are watching "The Dog Bachelor" until it is interrupted by a bad signal. Bose finds that Schwoz and Mika have disrupted the broadcast so that they can listen for aliens. Miles claims that there might be something out there in the universe that can defeat Captain Man. Ray then grabs the special microphone and challenges any alien to beat him. The next day, Ray has Chapa track down the bad commenters until Glerp from the Zormicon sector of the Rydek Galaxy arrives to answer the challenge. She starts to beat up Ray until Mika and Bose come in. Suddenly, Glerp and Bose suddenly fall for each other as the rest of Danger Force advises bringing an alien out in public. Bose states that he can put a hat on Glerp and pass herself off as a Canadian. Mika follows Bose and Glerp to Hip Hop Puree to keep an eye on them. As Bose and Glerp have their date, Mika watches them from a distance to keep an eye on them. Glerp catches Mika in the act and claims that she is in love with Bose as she asks some questions to Glerp and even gives her a solution to climate change. Then Mika finds that Bose has gotten older. She reports this to Ray as Glerp reappears. Ray and Chapa begin their ambush only to end up stapling them to the door. Glerp claims that all of them are in love with Bose. Bose then shows up as an old man as Mika claims that something is making Bose old. As Miles takes Bose to a Jimmy Buffett concert, Mika states to Bose that she is making him old and that she will die if she keeps it up. Glerp then hugs Mika and starts to age her. Ray starts to fight Glerp again as Chapa states to Mika that she is taking her anger of Bose being taken away on Ray. Chapa advises Ray to let Glerp take her anger on him so that she can return to the Zormicon sector. After Ray does what Chapa advises, Glerp takes her leave while leaving a message for Bose. Mika and Ray then use a special treadmill to restore Bose to his rightful age by walking backwards like how Mika did it. Guest star: Grace Lu as Glerp
| 26 | 26 | "Drive Hard" | Mike Caron | Andrew Thomas & Shamar Michael Curry | July 17, 2021 | 126 | 0.30 |
At the Man's Nest, AWOL is instructed to rescue a mountain climber named Mandy from the mountain. Captain Man interrupts the mission where his agent has hired him and Danger Force to deliver a hard drive containing "The Fight Attendant Two: Fasten Your Beat Belts" starring That Girl Lay Lay to Hollywood so that the Internet trolls and rival movie companies. While Schwoz handles Mandy, Captain Man arranges a road trip to Hollywood on a rented RV. Deuce Van Nuys speaks with Trent and Mary about everybody wanting to get their hands on that movie. As Captain Man and Danger Force drive to Las Vegas, Captain Man picks up hitchhikers who happen to be moms Caroline and Doris. ShoutOut and Volt voice their suspicions about the moms to Captain Man in the RV's bathroom. Caroline and Doris turn out to be after the movie and aunts as they set the RV to drive off the cliff while they make off with the hard drive. Shout-Out gets everyone out due to AWOL wanting to get his many cabbage bites in as Brainstorm stops the RV with his abilities. Captain Man and ShoutOut inform Deuce about what happened to the hard drive. Deuce admits that he has the real hard drive who has Lil' Dynomite and some mercenaries protecting him while the hard drive that was stolen actually contained A Walk to Remember. Displeased with Deuce's trickery, Danger Force plans to go after Deuce and get the real hard drive so that they can be the ones to bring it to Hollywood. With help from Schwoz, Captain Man and Danger Force catch up to Deuce, Lil' Dynomite, and the mercenaries. A road battle occurs between Danger Force and Deuce's mercenary to see who will get the hard drive as AWOL loses control of his teleportation. AWOL manages to claim the hard drive while Captain Man accidentally sends Lil' Dynomite flying out of control with the hard drive. Captain Man and Danger Force arrive in Hollywood. They attend the premiere of "The Fight Attendant Two: Fasten Your Beat Belts" with Mandy, Scwhoz, Deuce, and the injured mercenaries as That Girl Lay Lay introduces the film. Before they can begin, That Girl Lay Lay advises whoever parked their RV on the movie theater to move it as everyone looks at Brainstorm. Guest stars: Carrie Barrett as Mary, Mitchell Berg as Lil' Dynomite, Mike Caron as Deuce Van Nuys, Tori Keeth as Mandy, Winston Story as Trent, That Girl Lay Lay as That Girl Lay Lay

=== Season 2 (2021–22) ===
| No. overall | No. in season | Title | Directed by | Written by | Original release date | Prod. code | U.S. viewers (millions) |
|---|---|---|---|---|---|---|---|
| 27 | 1 | "An Imposter Among Us" | Mike Caron | Christopher J. Nowak | October 23, 2021 | 201 | 0.38 |
At the Man Cave, Mika sneaks in to put on a virtual reality headset. Five days earlier, Captain Man is shocked by an electric eel game as Mika tests out a virtual reality fight game that has Rick Twitler as an opponent as Captain Man tells them about Twitler's previous virus attack. Captain Man then turns out the Internet only to turn it back on when Schwoz could not download water for his shower. Captain Man sees the ten-second effects of Danger Force while expecting a thanks for defeating Rick Twitler. Mika works to play the virtual reality game until she can beat it. Five days later, Mika succeeds in beating the virtual reality game as she is suddenly taken over. The next day, Mika comes in dressed in a suit which causes Ray, Chapa, Miles, and Bose to become suspicious. She goes into a special prison where Drex, Chest Monster, and Tiny Ray are being held as Drex learns that Rick Twitler is in her brain so that he can shut down the Internet and send Earth back to the Dark Ages. Rick in Mika's body then ties a rope around Ray's ankle and sends him into space on a trash rocket. Ray returns and starts to bring up the suspicious virtual video game as he figures out that Rick is in Mika after bad guesses about Mika being possessed by Dr. Minyak, Bill Evil, Toddler, Jeff, and Krampus. Rick reveals his new superpower as Chapa shocks her out. Schwoz suggests that they take somewhere that Mika will be comfortable so they can exorcise Rick Twitler from her body. They combine exorcism with exercising to pull it off when Angela interrupts them. This causes them to send Ray's helper monkey to distract her. They succeed as Ray has the helper monkey throw the VR goggles into a trash rocket to get rid of Rick Twitler. What they do not know is that the helper monkey failed to put the virtual reality headset into the trash rocket as Rick Twitler states that "it's not over". Guest stars: Carrie Barrett as Mary, David Blue as Rick Twitler, Nakia Burrise as Angela, Andrew Caldwell as Mitch Bilsky V.O., Winston Story as Trent, Tommy Walker as Drex
| 28 | 2 | "The Drex Factor" "A Danger Among Us" | Mike Caron | Jake Farrow | October 30, 2021 | 202 | 0.36 |
Five days from the events in the last episode, Ray assembles the Danger Force for their trip to Dingoland where he uses a cast to pose as an injured Dingoland patron. Miles has a vision about Drex and Rick Twitler. Schwoz does a blood test to see if anyone is possessed by Rick Twitler. Though the results will be in five hours. As Ray and Chapa hunt down Mika, Miles, and Bose, they find the Helper Monkey in the prison room where Drex, Chest Monster, and Tiny Ray are imprisoned. Ray and Chapa find AWOL in the hot tub room. Then they find Brainstorm in another room streaming four dates from his charity. Mika tries to resist one of Chapa's traps to no avail. After taking their blood, Schwoz receives the results which state that none of them are possessed by Rick Twitler. When Ray is suspected and he advises Helper Monkey to help him, Danger Force finds Helper Monkey with Rick Twitler's suit and that he was possessed by Rick Twitler. Following the possessed Helper Monkey, they end up in the prison room where Drex has been freed from his cell. Ray is backed into a prison cell by Drex before being zapped by Chapa as she, Mika, Miles, and Bose assume their superhero forms. Drex is chased through the different rooms by Danger Force as Rick Twitler works to re-enter his original body that has been converted into a cyborg. Once the procedure is done, Rick Twitler is back in his body as Drex is subdued. Captain Man catches up to Danger Force with help from Helper Monkey. Rick Twitler contacts Danger Force stating that he has rewired the trash rockets to launch the Man's Nest into outer space. The KLVY satellite is then taken over by Virus. Guest stars: David Blue as Rick Twitler, Tommy Walker as Drex
| 29 | 3 | "A Cyborg Among Us" | Mike Caron | Andrew Thomas | November 6, 2021 | 203 | 0.45 |
Continuing from the last episode, the Man's Nest has been launched into outer space as Drex is shown to be tied up. Rick Twitler's cyborg form informs Trent and Mary that Captain Man is not going to save him and activates the KLVY satellite where the remnants of the sentient living computer virus are. AWOL works to teleport himself and Brainstorm to Earth only to end up inside of one of the trash rockets. Captain Man plans to send a strapped Shout-Out to outer space so that her sonic scream can steer the Man's Nest towards the KLVY satellite. Afterward, Schwoz states that the Man's Nest might be destroyed in the process. As Rick Twitler works to activate the virus, AWOL and Brainstorm arrive to fight Rick Twitler. Back at the Man Cave, Schwoz states that they should put something in between it and the KLVY satellite as Captain Man uses Drex to do it since he is still indestructible. AWOL and Brainstorm continue their fight with Rick Twitler as two of Brainstorm's dates show up. Brainstorm throws himself in front of Rick Twitler's attack to protect them. The Man's Nest succeeds at the cost of Drex becoming possessed by the Sentient Living Computer Virus. The Man's Nest is heading back to Earth as Schwoz has not figured out how to slow their descent as Drex's virus-possessed form appears. Captain Man fights Drex while not wanting to call Henry for back-up. Guest stars: Carrie Barrett as Mary, David Blue as Rick Twitler, Winston Story as Trent, Tommy Walker as Drex
| 30 | 4 | "A Henry Among Us" | Mike Caron | Christopher J. Nowak | November 13, 2021 | 204 | 0.29 |
Continuing from the last episode, the cameras at KLVY revealed that Rick Twitler's cyborg form wrote some notes, made off with ShoutOut and Volt, and left Drex a message on where to meet him. At the Man's Nest, Captain Man informs Schwoz about ShoutOut and Volt as they try to make contact with Henry Hart. At Dystopia, Henry informs a bartender named Jemma about him keeping his distance when AWOL shows up to enlist him. On top of the Nakatomi Tower, ShoutOut and Volt wake up to find special devices suppressing their abilities on them as Rick Twitler works on his next plot. Drex shows up and is persuaded by Rick Twitler not to kill him for having him shot into outer space in exchange for revenge on Henry. At the Man's Nest, Henry is brought in by AWOL as he reunites with Captain Man and Schwoz as Henry is having boundaries issues with Ray. At the Nakatomi Tower, Rick Twitler informs Drex of his plans as Mika manages to secretly call them. The rest of Danger Force listens in as he plans to fuse with the Internet and control everything connected to it. To complete this plot, he will need the Iridium Crystals in the ruins of the Man-Cave as Drex goes to obtain them. Rick Twitler wants ShoutOut and Volt to help him in his plans as he tries to tempt them like helping Chapa find where her cell phone is. He then activates Plan C by immobilizing them as Schwoz forgot to track their location. Rick Twitler then uses the special virtual reality headsets to control them. Captain Man, Henry, AWOL, and Brainstorm plan to ambush Drex. After Drex gets the crystal, he is ambushed by Captain Man until a mind-controlled ShoutOut and Volt attack the rest of Danger Force into unconsciousness. Drex is then instructed to make off with Henry. At the Nakatomi Tower, Drex is displeased that Rick Twitler had a change of plans that involves tampering in his force field to surround Swellview. AWOL takes Captain Man and Brainstorm to the top of Nakatomi Tower where they engage Drex and a mind-controlled ShoutOut and Volt. Brainstorm tricks ShoutOut and Volt into attacking each other. Despite the attacks, Captain Man frees Henry whose forcefield knocks down ShoutOut and Volt as AWOL and Brainstorm work to undo the mind-control. Once that was done, ShoutOut and Volt use their attacks to subdue Rick Twitler. At Volt's suggestion, Rick Twitler's head is placed in a box. With Drex still out there, Henry plans to go after him and parts ways with Captain Man as Schwoz works to subdue Rick Twitler's body. Guest stars: Jace Norman as Henry Hart, Carrie Barrett as Mary, David Blue as Rick Twitler, Winston Story as Trent, Tommy Walker as Drex
| 31 | 5 | "Krampapalooza" | Michael D. Cohen | Shamar Michael Curry | November 20, 2021 | 207 | 0.31 |
At the Man's Nest, Captain Man and Volt film a Power Milk commercial with Bose portraying Dr. Minyak where he shaved his head and got a real tattoo of Bro Co. instead of using a bald cap and a fake tattoo. ShoutOut and AWOL bring in a smelly mattress where they plan to use the Man's Nest as a hotel during Swellchella to raise money to get out of the Bro Co. contract. Schwoz poses as Calvin Skateboarder to promote the Man's Nest special offer to have people stay as the news of Hurricane Karen heading towards Swellview. As Volt burns off Bose's tattoo, ShoutOut and AWOL head to KLVY where they tell Trent and Mary that they will hold Swellchella at the Man's Nest as Captain Man plans to get money from them while Brainstorm wears a wig. As the plan goes into motion, Captain Man finds that one of the guests is Krampus who apologizes for the Christmas incident he caused. Brainstorm unintentionally feeds Krampus the Power Milk in his room near Tiny Ray and the Chest Monster as he starts to drink all of it. Archduke Fernando shows up at the hotel to attend Swellchella. Krampus shows up to complain about Tiny Ray and Chest Monster as Captain Man upgrades him. Volt and Brainstorm are instructed to follow Krampus to make sure he does not corrupt anyone. Displeased that Archduke Fernando used high shorts to cheat against him in a boxing match, Captain Man plans to take the belt he won. As Court and Courtney perform, Krampus disrupts the performance and corrupts them into playing a song he likes and corrupting the attendees. Captain Man is informed about Krampus' action as it is discovered that Power Milk has energy drink components in it. Krampus appears and challenges Captain Man for the belt that Captain Man claimed from Archduke Fernando's room where Krampus challenges him for the fate of the belt and the money that was made. As the wrestling match begins, Krampus starts to attack Captain Man due to no rules. Archduke Fernando crashes the match and assists Krampus in fighting Captain Man. This causes Danger Force to assist Captain Man in fighting Krampus and Archduke Fernando. Volt and ShoutOut do the Windy Sizzler to help defeat Krampus and Archduke Fernando as Court and Courtney are changed back. Krampus and Archduke Fernando make off with the Power Milk as ShoutOut states that they have enough money to get themselves out of the contract. Court and Courtney perform for Captain Man, Schwoz, and Danger Force as Brainstorm learns from Court and Courtney that Power Milk can grow hair back faster. He removes the wig he was wearing and finds that his hair has grown back. Guest stars: Carrie Barrett as Mary, Joe Gillette as Archduke Fernando, Tori Keeth as Mandy, Kurt Quinn as Krampus, Winston Story as Trent
| 32 | 6 | "Mika's Musical" | Mike Caron | Shukri R. Abdi | January 6, 2022 | 206 | 0.46 |
Following a fight with Arson Boy, Danger Force celebrates their victory with hamburgers. After Volt and Brainstorm depart, AWOL and ShoutOut change back into Miles and Mika as Herman comes out who informs them that Mrs. Offskrin's daughter got into Harbard due to her curricular activities. To get out of Herm-School that will also be overseen by their aunt Officer Walnut after calling Angela about it from her trip at Burning Man. Mika makes up a curriculum about the history of Swellview. Mika and Miles rope in Ray, Chapa, and Bose into helping them put on a play by the deadline. Trent and Mary interview Frankini about his review of Cats when he is cut off by Schowz in the alias of play critic Gene Onion from Big City who talks about "The History of Swellview: As Told Through the Burger Parties". At the Man's Nest, Danger Force works on developing the play when they get a call from Vice Mayor Willard and Celia who want Danger Force to make sure Willard does not get kidnapped. On the day of the play, Danger Force works to put on the play while working to keep Willard safe. ShoutOut recognizes one of the audience members as Frankini in disguise. ShoutOut and Brainstorm swap with Volt and AWOL to make sure that Frankini does not kidnap Willard. As Mika and Bose perform their scene, Volt and AWOL find that Frankini has kidnapped Willard. They catch up to Frankini in the restroom and subdue him. Herman hears the conflict from where the play is as Officer Walnut states that she is off duty. He claims that it is not a real kidnapping as Willard hired him to kidnap him whenever he does not want to do certain things like attending Bose's play. Volt intimidates Willard to continue watching the play. Through a suggestion from Frankini, the rest of the play is turned into a musical with Frankini helping out as they sing "Burger Party". The play turns out to be a success with even Willard, Herman, and Officer Walnut impressed. Schwoz' Gene Onion alias gives SW.A.G the award for the best play he has ever seen. Ray accepts the award as part of the set falls on Frankini causing everyone to get it off him. Guest stars: Frankie Grande as Frankini, Carrie Barrett as Mary, Timothy Brennan as Vice Mayor Willard, Antonio D. Charity as Herman, Dayna Dooley as Officer Walnut, Siobhan Murphy as Celia, Winston Story as Trent
| 33 | 7 | "Dude, Where's My Man Buggy?" | Russ Reinsel | Nathan Knetchel | January 13, 2022 | 205 | 0.25 |
At the Man's Nest, Danger Force has fixed up the Man Buggy as Mika states that Ray would allow them to borrow it if they did a good job. After an inspection in the Man Garage, Ray finds that the mud smudge that looks like was washed up which they did not hear while disarming a detonator. As Ray turns them down because of what happened to the smudge, Danger Force has no choice but to follow Schwoz's advice to borrow the car as he gives them an extra key. Using the Man Buggy, Danger Force drives up to Club Soda in style where Volt mistook Jeff as a valet. He then drives off with the Man Buggy leaving his scooter behind. Two hours later, Danger Force finds the Man Buggy missing before they can make plans to attend Arson Boy's afterparty. As Schwoz reads Ray the book "The Winds of Beif" so that Ray can attend the movie with B.P.W.A.R.T.B.F. (Better People Who Actually Read The Book First), he is informed by Danger Force of what happened as Ray wakes up. While AWOL takes Ray to the movie and Brainstorm and Volt head out, ShoutOut and Schwoz find out that Jeff is responsible as ShoutOut tries to get Jeff to stay on the phone so that he can be tracked. Toddler sees Jeff with the car as they take it on a heist where they eat the gum that places them in copies of Captain Man's outfit. When Brainstorm and Volt return, ShoutOut informs them that Jeff has the Man Buggy as Trent and Mary report on the crime spree. Ray and AWOL return where Ray apologizes for what happened earlier. Ray finds the Man Buggy missing and he thinks that Schwoz was responsible despite Danger Force confessing. Ray becomes Captain Man and goes to look for the Man Buggy and Schwoz. Trent and Mary report that the police are in a stand-off with the Man Buggy at Club Soda. Danger Force goes to Club Soda to confront Jeff and Toddler as they activate the Man Buggy's force field. AWOL bypasses the forcefield and swats them until the forcefield is deactivated. Brainstorm ejects Jeff and Toddler from the Man Buggy as Danger Force claims to the arriving Captain Man that they broke into the Man Garage. The police arrive where they are having a hard time finding the difference. Volt narrows it down where Captain Man is unharmed. Then Captain Man and Danger Force notice a mud smudge where they argue what it resembles. During the morning news, Ray and Danger Force hear the news about people in red vests being zapped and a crying man who ruined the special screening of "The Winds of Beif" with his incessant sobbing. Danger Force takes the opportunity to mock Ray for his incessant sobbing as the mud smudge is shown to resemble the Danger Force logo. Guest stars: Carrie Barrett as Mary, Ben Giroux as Toddler, Ryan Grassmeyer as Jeff, Winston Story as Trent
| 34 | 8 | "Power Problems Part 1" | Evelyn Belasco | Adrian McNair | January 20, 2022 | 210 | 0.25 |
At the pirate-themed restaurant Big Beard's, Captain Man and Danger Force are dining where they get special shrimp from Big Beard's daughter Lilith who hits on Brainstorm. Schwoz contacts them about male swimsuit models being trapped in a walk-in freezer. Danger Force heads out to stop gas mask-wearing clown called Gas Clown from robbing Hip Hop Puree. When they arrive, Gas Clown uses his gases on them where it causes problems with their powers like Volt losing control of her electrokinesis, AWOL teleporting into items, ShoutOut being blasted back by her voice, and Brainstorm getting whatever he lifts with his mind heading straight to him. After Gas Clown escapes, Danger Force falls back to the Man's Nest and informs Schwoz what happened to them. Now they've lost their powers. Schwoz states that they must not let Ray know about this or else he will shut down SW.A.G and take Schwoz to Reno, Nevada. Ray returns after rescuing the male swimsuit models as Danger Force works to cover up what had happened to their powers by claiming that Gas Clown had an untimely death. This gets worse when Arson Boy is robbing a match factory as Danger Force lies that they must meet with the Gas Clown's family. At Big Beard's, Danger Force is having drinks where Lilith serves them lobster. Trent and Mary report on Captain Man having defeated Arson Boy with the male swimsuit models. Schwoz calls them up stating that he might be able to synthesize an antidote if they can get a sample of Gas Clown's gas. Later that night, Schwoz makes special equipment to copy their powers. They head to Club Soda which is being robbed by Gas Clown and crash into his car. Gas Clown is now accompanied by his fellow clowns that were in his car where Danger Force works to use their equipment on them. Captain Man shows up and defeats the clowns where he orders them back to the Man's Nest. At the Man's Nest, Captain Man scolds Danger Force and Schwoz for their lies as a vigil is held over the parrot Justin Beaker colliding with the Man's Nest. Though they managed to get a sample of Gas Clown's glass. Schwoz completes the antidote which he distributes to the Danger Force. Though the darts were the real antidote. Unfortunately, it does not work and Danger Force turns in their gum as part of their suspension from crime. Brainstorm ends up suggesting that they order from Big Beard's. As Big Beard takes their order, he starts to make it by taking some red-colored fish out of a small chest. Guest stars: Carrie Barrett as Mary, Ben Dukes as Big Beard, Daire McLeod as Lilith, Lars Slind as Jan, Winston Story as Trent
| 35 | 9 | "Power Problems Part 2" | Evelyn Belasco | Jake Farrow | January 27, 2022 | 211 | 0.33 |
Continuing from the last episode, a depowered Danger Force has been suspended from fighting crime as they try to figure out what caused them to lose their powers. As Ray shuts down SW.A.G, Schwoz finds a movie called "Our Powers, Our Selves" that talks about superpower puberty. Mika informs everyone a theory about what caused them to lose their powers and suspects the food from Big Beard's. Schwoz figures out that juice from the red-eyed mudfish was responsible which he mentioned on his Schwozcast to boost up the ratings. To go undercover, Miles replicates the Danger Force outfits so that Mika and Bose can go undercover at Big Beard's and obtain the red-eyed mudfish. Chapa poses as a delivery person to place a shipment of crabs in the kitchen. When a waiter named Steven goes to get the crabs from the container since they are out of lobsters, they find Miles in there claiming that he was caught in a crab fishing trap. Chapa rescues Miles as Big Beard calls for his fellow pirates to catch them. Lilith takes Mika and Bose onto a boat where she traps them in a cage where she and the pirates with her take them to international waters where there are no laws. Lilith also reveals that she is in charge of the pirates as she plans to use social media to forcefully marry Brainstorm. She also introduces her first mate Schwoby who understands Schwoz's language. As Lilith begins her marriage to Brainstorm, Chapa and Mika work to survive Big Beard's attacks without their powers. Steven gives Chapa and Miles some swords before quitting. They defeat Big Beard and cut off their beard as he mentions Lilith's plot. Back at the wedding, Bose repeats what Lilith's parrot says until Captain Man arrives in the Man-Copter only to get seasick. Mika and Brainstorm fight off the pirates as Mika defeats Lilith. One week later, Captain Man, Mika, and Bose reunite with Chapa, Miles, and Schwoz at the Man Cave. Schwoz was unable to use the red-eyed mudfish to make an antidote. Captain Man lifts the suspension on Danger Force as they are returned their gum. Upon assuming their superhero forms, the same parrot appears with a still-alive Justin Beaker where they are engaged after their marriage was in international waters. Guest stars: Ben Dukes as Big Beard, Daire McLeod as Lilith
| 36 | 10 | "Attack of the Clones" | Leonard R. Garner Jr. | Jake Farrow | February 3, 2022 | 212 | 0.45 |
At the Man's Nest, Danger Force tries the remedies to regain their powers that Schwoz told them about. It turns out that it was a prank by Mika who also did a prank on Ray where bananas would give him super-hearing. Ray has Danger Force take Chest Monster to his three-day family reunion where their powers will not work. Due to the toilets being removed following the last time he and Schwoz were left alone, Ray sends Danger Force off with Chest Monster. When it worsens without them gone like a microwave fire and Cave Kid, Ray brings in the Danger Force clones to help out around the Man's Nest and has a date with a clone of Kris Hart. Schwoz notices that the clones are different while also having been created without superpowers. The Danger Force clones cause trouble in town during Ray's date with Kris' clone. The next day, the Danger Force clones return with an ATM that they "found". Ray finds that the clones have powers and perform a coup d'état with Kris' clone. They trap him in the clones' room and free Schwoz's clones. After receiving a call from Danger Force that they are on their way back due to Chest Monster not being invited to the family reunion, Ray works to get out. Schwoz escapes from his trap and frees Ray while mentioning that he used spicy milk to create them instead of normal milk which explains their bad behavior. As Bigfoot is in Las Vegas at Chupacabra's wedding which Ray claims that his invitation to was "lost in the mail", Schwoz persuades Ray to enlist Danger Force to help fight the clones. Danger Force returns as Schwoz states that they must get to a sleep button as they use Ray as bait. A bound Ray is used as a diversion as Danger Force and Ray hit the sleep button. As a suggestion from Chest Monster, Schwoz makes a machine powered with plutonium and places the clones' powers into Danger Force enough to repower them. As Danger Force goes on patrol and Schwoz disposes of the used-up plutonium in an adjacent city, Ray has a date with Kris' clone while forgiving her for attacking him. Guest stars: Carrie Barrett as Mary, Winston Story as Trent, Kelly Sullivan as Clone Kris / Tiny Clone Kris
| 37 | 11 | "Bottle Snatchers" | Elvira Ibragimova | Rachel Wenitsky | February 10, 2022 | 208 | 0.31 |
At the Man's Nest, Danger Force is having pizza when Captain Man comes in answers a call from Club Soda's child owner Tony Soda who informs them that the Bottle Snatchers are plotting to steal his Gold Soda bottle opener and the associated Gold Soda he received from the Soda Pope. Captain Man does not want to go because he is going to play with his train set. Danger Force goes to Club Soda where they sight Mitch Bilsky there. The lights go out as Volt turns it back on where they thwart Mitch and the Bottle Snatchers from stealing the Gold Soda. After Mitch and the Bottle Snatchers get away, Tony celebrates Danger Force's victory where he event gets them on the Wall of Legends. The next day, Ray hears about the outcome of the mission and teaches lesson #9,005 that the superheroes and their secret identities are different people. He challenges them to go back to Club Soda in their secret identity while he watches to make sure they do not cheat. If they fail, they must buy him the Lil' Tugger train terminal. If Ray fails to get into the club, Danger Force will take away his train set for a week. Chapa, Mika, Miles, and Bose have a hard time impressing everyone in Club Soda with comical results while Ray tries to get into no avail as the bouncer blows his elderly whistle that can be heard by anyone who is not a kid. Mitch and the Bottle Snatchers sneak in as delivery men where they make their next attempt at stealing the Gold Soda. This causes Chapa, Mika, Miles, and Bose to try to stop Mitch. Ray hears about it from the crowd and changes into Captain Man to confront Mitch and the Bottle Snatchers. While Captain Man defeats the Bottle Snatchers, he punches Mitch as the kids catch the Gold Soda. Tony Soda praises them and has them photographed on the Wall of Legends as he orders Captain Man to leave as he is told old to be in Club Soda as Captain Man considers this an ageist malarkey upon his departure. Though Captain Man manages to get a background shot in. The next night, the children attend Club Soda as Mika successfully gets a dance in on the dance floor. Guest stars: Gilbert Aguirre as Tony Soda, Andrew Lewis Caldwell as Mitch Bilsky, Jim Titus as Tommy / Bobby Bitters
| 38 | 12 | "The Girl Who Cried Danger" | Mike Caron | Dicky Murphy | February 17, 2022 | 209 | 0.37 |
At the Man's Nest, Schwoz argues with Ray about discarding items during spring cleaning while Mika researched the elusive Greasy Grady, and Bose is sent to Jamaica by his parents for the weekend for not cleaning his room. Captain Man and Danger Force are summoned to the hot dog restaurant Duke E. Dawg's to handle an emergency where a girl is trapped in the ball pit. Volt and ShoutOut rescue the girl Riley who is the biggest fan of Volt and ShoutOut much to the dismay of AWOL. Chapa and Mika later receive Volt and ShoutOut sculptures from Riley as Ray claims that Riley is a Clinger which is a name he calls an unhealthy fan. Schwoz informs everyone that Riley is in danger again at Duke E. Dawg's claiming that she cut her finger until they find that the blood is actually fancy ketchup. She manages to get hair samples from Volt and ShoutOut which puts Riley at Clinger Sign #3. As Ray is still not discarding some of his stuff, AWOL succeeds in capturing Greasy Grady as Captain Man has AWOL take him down to the Man Dungeon. Ray states to Volt and ShoutOut to find a new host for Riley as they try to pass her off on AWOL. Schwoz poses as Toddler to rob Duke E. Dawg's to fake a robbery so that Volt and ShoutOut can fake their defeat so that AWOL can come in and defeat him. After Volt and ShoutOut get trapped by "Toddler", the real Toddler shows up with his henchmen to confront the fake Toddler who stole his clothes. As Captain Man plays a Whac-a-Mole game, AWOL fights Toddler's henchmen while Schwoz fights Toddler. Toddler escapes while AWOL fires on the fleeing henchmen. Then Schwoz rescues Riley from the ball pit after AWOL botches freeing her from the net. Volt and ShoutOut confess to faking Schwoz as Riley starts clinging to Schwoz. Later that night, Captain Man, Volt, AWOL, and ShoutOut return to the Man's Nest to find that Bose has returned from Jamaica. When Captain Man notices that his stuff is gone, Bose states that Greasy Grady asked him to let him out and took all of Captain Man's stuff as Captain Man shouts Greasy Grady's name. Greasy Grady is shown watching one of Captain Man's home DVDs as he finds one piece of advice he gave actually works. Guest stars: Ben Giroux as The Toddler, Isabella Meneses as Riley
| 39 | 13 | "Bilsky's Billions" | Leonard R. Garner Jr. | Andrew Thomas | February 24, 2022 | 213 | 0.28 |
At the Man's Nest, Schwoz has Danger Force partake in Yo-Yo Yoga. While Miles goes on a Yo-Yo Yoga retreat at Stretch Mountain, Ray shows off his new teeth where everyone ridicules him. Ray is alerted that Mitch Bilsky is causing trouble at Hip Hop Puree. ShoutOut finds that Officer Walnut has already arrested him for sucking puree out of a machine where they meet a child judge named Judge Tootie who presides over the trial. The Kid Lawyer advises Mitch to plead guilty. He does and is sentenced to 20 years in Swellview Prison. Due to Mitch having not graduated high school, ShoutOut persuades Judge Tootie to let him try to graduate at SW.A.G. Ray is informed about what happened as he is persuaded to help Mitch graduate high school....especially due to the fact that the Mitch's ancestor Abageezer will give his inheritance to the first Bilsky to graduate. Mika claims that Ray will use the money to get the ridiculed teeth out. Miss Shapen drops off Mitch for his first day at SW.A.G. Jeff crashes the class to try to rob the dirt in Vice Mayor Willard's backyard only to be repelled by Mika as Jeff plans to get those billions. As Mitch states that Bilsky's cannot learn stuff, Chapa and Mika help him out as they do a montage with a musical number. After the successful progression, Mitch succeeds in some of his lessions as Officer Walnut arrives with Jeff who states that Mitch helped him steal some fur-covered turtles (or "furtles" for short) from the pet store. Officer Walnut finds fur-covered turtles in Mitch's pants as he claims that he was set up. Mika states that if Mitch graduates before Judge Tootie arrives, she can wipe the slate clean as Shapen is enlisted to take the final exam. Mitch goes through the different parts of the final exam which he passes until the final part that involves beating Shapen in arm-wrestling where she got strong from using a weighted pen. Mitch struggles against Shapen and manages to overcome her. Judge Tootie arrives as Mika stated that Mitch has graduated. Shapen leaves as Judge Tootie wipes his slate clean. Jeff flees from Officer Walnut after mentioning that he framed Mitch by planting the "furtles" in his pants. Mitch gives his inheritants to himself much to the dismay of Ray. After Mitch leaves, Ray states that he will not be able to get the money to regain his regular teeth. Bose asks Ray if he knows how much Kid Dentist charges as he mentions that he is also a lawyer. This is proven right as the same kid arrives after a game with Judge Tootie and prepares to work on Ray's teeth with a drill. Guest stars: Carrie Barrett as Mary, Jill Benjamin as Miss Shapen, Andrew Lewis Caldwell as Mitch Bilsky, Dayna Dooley as Officer Walnut, Ryan Grassmeyer as Jeff Bilsky, Kapri Ladd as Judge Tootie, Winston Story as Trent
| 40 | 14 | "Jack the Clipper" | Mike Caron | Nathan Knetchel | March 3, 2022 | 214 | 0.31 |
At the Man's Nest, Ray comes in to see Schwoz and Danger Force watching the new episode "Genuine Moments" when the Danger Force signal is shown in the sky. This causes Captain Man and Danger Force to arrive at Nakatomi Tower where Swellview's new police commissioner named Melverp "The Commissioner" Korthenschotzz who is overbearing towards Captain Man as he meets Danger Force and informs them about Jack the Clipper who gives people heinous haircuts like what he did to his hair. The Commissioner states that Jack the Clipper can strike anyone at "anytime, any hair". Danger Force reviews Jack the Clipper's attacks on Natalie Mazdah, Vice Mayor Willard, and Benny the Dog with a Hat. Trent and Mary interview Jack the Clipper's first victim Regina Peacock until the lights go off causing Captain Man and Danger Force to go to KLVY where Trent and Mary are Jack the Clipper's latest victims. They find a message from Jack the Clipper stating that he is going after Captain Man and Danger Force's hair yet. Captain Man and Danger Force meet with The Commissioner again who was locked on the roof and noticed that he saw someone with scissors for fingers heading into Hip Hop Puree leaving The Commissioner trapped on the roof again. Arriving at Hip Hop Puree, Captain Man and Danger Force had caused the haircuts to the patrons there as they find Jack the Clipper with AWOL having a feeling about. As AWOL goes to speak to Regina, Captain Man and the rest of Danger Force confront Jack the Clipper as one of the patrons states that person they thought is Jack the Clipper is actually Freddie Scissor-Fingers whose fingers are actually safety scissors and that everyone there is taking part in the two-for-one sale for Jack the Clipper's victims. Meanwhile, AWOL goes to visit Regina to learn more about Jack the Clipper where it is revealed that Regina is Jack the Clipper due to the fact that Jack the Clipper was left-handed. AWOL figures it out where Regina states that she goes by the name of Regina the Clipper as she turns off the light and makes use of night vision goggles while mentioning that her hair was permanently damaged due to a barbershop accidentally. AWOL manages to subdue Regina and brings her to the Man's Nest while the rest of Danger Force was watching "Genuine Moments". Captain Man and the rest of Danger Force engage Regina the Clipper and knock her down. She gets up and destroys the TV, causing Volt and ShoutOut to defeat her and AWOL delivers her to the police. The Danger Force signal is lit up again. Arriving at the top of Nakamori Tower, The Commissioner states that he wants to be Captain Man's best friend as Danger Force leaves them alone. Trapped on the roof with The Commissioner, Captain Man pretends to give into the hug request only to jump off the roof and land on The Commissioner's Sedan. Guest stars: Carrie Barrett as Mary, Sitara Falcon as The Commissioner, Jess Nurse as Regina Peacock, Winston Story as Trent
| 41 | 15 | "The Supies" | Mike Caron | Rachel Wenitsky | April 9, 2022 | 217 | 0.43 |
At the Man's Nest, Danger Force puts together their Build-O project. The Supies are an award show for superheroes. Schwoz has been unable to tell Ray that he was not nominated again. When he does tell Ray with Bose's help, Ray reacts to this badly even when he finds out that Danger Force has been nominated for Best Sidekick. Later that night, Ray stakes out The Beatin' Dungeon thinking that the villains might be planning something. Knowing that Ray will get in trouble fighting the villains there, Danger Force calls in Henry to watch him while they are at the Supies and make sure he eats his broccoli. Schwoz plans to get Ray to The Beatin' Dungeon where he has Tiny Ray grown for four hours in exchange for a raise. Ray infiltrates The Beatin' Dungeon as Hawkfist. When the jig is up, Tiny Ray and Schwoz run. At the Supies, Danger Force meet the Bro Toads who are also up for Best Sidekicks and have won the award for four years. Henry shows up and reveals what happened with Ray. At The Beatin' Dungeon, Frankini is hosting the Villys where he claims that Captain Man's excellence has inspired them to be better villains as he plans to give him a Lifetime Achievement Award. Captain Man then sheds his disguise in private and accepts the award. He is then attacked by the villains who then capture him. Because of this when called by Captain Man, Danger Force have no choice but to try to rescue him quick while Henry tries to hook up with Major Babe who ties him up since she does not think that he is a superhero. Unfortunately, Danger Force is captured as well as Sweaty Eddie and Doctor Dandruff start dumping their stuff on them. AWOL tricks Sweaty Eddie into freeing his arm so that he can bring Henry to help them. Despite being bound, Henry uses his chair attacks until he was unintentionally freed by Gas Clown. Everyone else breaks their chairs to get free and defeat the villains. Afterwards, Danger Force returns to the Supies with Captain Man and Henry where the Bro Toads were declared the winners for Best Sidekicks. Captain Man crashes their acceptance speech to talk good about Danger Force and makes off with their trophy with the Bro Toads and Major Babe chasing after him. When ShoutOut asks if they should help Captain Man, Henry suggests that they play the video game "Grand Theft Horse Thief 4: Rancho Cucomonga". They play that video game as Captain Man runs from the Bro Toads and Major Babe. Guest stars: Jace Norman as Henry Hart, Frankie Grande as Frankini, Ethan Drew as Bro Toad Todd, Jason Gibbs as Lawn Ranger, Nida Khurshid as Major Babe, Lazarus Tate as Bro Toad Ted
| 42 | 16 | "Alien Zoo" | Evelyn Belasco | Shukri R. Abdi | April 28, 2022 | 215 | 0.15 |
At the Man's Nest, Captain Man, Volt, ShoutOut, and Brainstorm are confronted by Miles who rants to them about a system that puts wild animals in prison with them having just visited the Swellview Zoo. As Miles gets everyone into a group hug, he actually brings them to the Swellview Zoo and places them in an enclosure to make them learn their lessons about zoos being bad. The enclosure that they were put in belonged to a possessive gorilla named Pickles. The next morning, Trent and Mary report about the incident where they are with Pickles. Meanwhile in outer space, Derp and his friend Blerp abduct Captain Man, Volt, ShoutOut, and Brainstorm to save their alien zoo as all they got were the last unicorns. They are put in their enclosure for the Gorgatrons to see as they find their powers are also negated. Their attempts to get out only serves as entertainment for the spectators until they watch Alien Genuine Moments. Mika and Schwoz contact Glerp to help them find Captain Man and the rest of Danger Force. She tracks them to the swamp planet Blorida as a contact from her ex-boyfriend plans to auction Bose off to some rich aliens. The rich alien Beezo purchase Captain Man, Volt, ShoutOut, and Brainstorm so that he can eat them with Dark Zuckerblerg as he asks which one is more tasty. As Captain Man, Volt, ShoutOut are Brainstorm are being prepared in the cauldron for consumption, Miles and Glerp arrive disguised as chefs. After getting the confession that zoos are bad, Miles frees them as Captain Man will not accept his lesson. To make his teleporting powers work, Miles has to eat unicorn poop which will help due to alien science. Miles eats the unicorn poop which tastes like cotton candy enabling him to free everyone. Beezos and Zuckerblerg hear about what happened as they plan to eat Derp and Blerp. Back on Earth, Bose uses the age-reversing teadmill as Miles fails to get Captain Man to learn his lesson about zoos being bad. Before leaving with Schwoz, Miles teleports Pickles into the Man's Nest to keep Captain Man company. As Pickles enters the cauldron, Captain Man tells him not to jostle him. Guest stars: Carrie Barrett as Mary, Grace Lu as Glerp, Brandon Severs as Derp, Justin Stell as Blerp, Winston Story as Trent
| 43 | 17 | "Let's Go to the Movies!" | Mike Caron | Shamar Michael Curry | May 5, 2022 | 216 | 0.28 |
At SW.A.G., Ray teaches his students how to properly hit a bad guy without powers by claiming that one can hurt a villain's feelings. Schwoz interrupts the lessons stating that Deuce Van Nuys is arriving where Mika mentions about a vampire movie with Ryan Reynolds until Schwoz states that the movie fell through. As Bose did not answer the messages at the Man's Nest and Deuce is on his way to hear about another movie idea. As Mika is out of ideas, Schwoz goes upstairs in the alias of Lefty Schwartz to stall him by pitching his idea for a movie that would involve Bradley Cooper, Hugh Jackman, Benedict Cumberbatch, and BTS. Everyone helps Mika come up with an idea.: Miles pitches an idea for a buddy cop movie where Chief Screamy appoints a grizzled police is paired up with Officer Wingnut to take down a bad guy.; Chapa pitches an idea for a film about a game that kids play where anyone who loses has something bad happened to them. Mika considers it a rip-off of Squid Game.; Bose pitches an idea for a film about four squirrels go on a trip until aliens invade with an army of zombies who sing.; Tiny Ray pitches an idea for a film called "Tiny Chef" about a tiny chef who controls a normal-sized chef in cooking.; Chest Monster pitches an idea for a film that Chapa stars in where she exacts revenge on the bad guys who killed her cell phone. Ray claims that Chest Monster is spoofing John Wick and other Keanu Reeves movies.; Inspiration from an emergency call from Mitch Bilsky causes Mika to pitch an idea for a film where two warriors fight in space. Then there is a segment about a school for wizard where the wizards meet an archaeologist who makes an amazing discovery. Before an explanation can be done, everyone goes on a high-speed bike chase.; When the pitch is done, everyone goes up in their superhero identities to pitch the idea to Deuce only to hear that the talking training dummy has pitched a movie starring Keanu Reeves which Deuce approved of. Once they left, Chest Monster stated that he told them to pitch a movie with Keanu Reeves. Captain Man orders Schwoz to ready the Man Cannon which he shoots Chest Monster out of. Guest stars: Andrew Lewis Caldwell as Mitch, Mike Caron as Deuce Van Nuys, Ryan Grassmeyer as Jeff Bilsky V.O.
| 44 | 18 | "Minyak Attack" | Mike Caron | Dicky Murphy | May 12, 2022 | 218 | 0.25 |
At the Man's Nest, Ray and Danger Force are doing art with paintball guns because Celia bought art and Bose tried to fix it while Celia is away at Mom Con which Captain Man was banned from. Just then, Dr. Minyak arrives with Kid Lawyer who reveals that Captain Man's failure to pay his taxes causing Minyak to exploit the tax loophole and buy the Man's Nest. Judge Tootie has claimed that it is official. Though there is a loophole states that it can be owned to whoever leaves the Man's Nest Form meaning that Minyak cannot be forced to leave the Man's Nest. Captain Man and Danger Force tries to come up with every tactic to get Minyak to leave the Man's Nest. Captain Man tries to drive him off with his Christmas album which Minyak arrives. Then Danger Force tries to raise the heat with coals which does not bother Minyak. Chapa poses as Delivery Joe in an attempt to get Minyak to step out and sign for a package which Brainstorm botches it. Minyak takes advantage of Captain Man not being able to leave the Man's Nest to fight crime. He even contacts Trent and Mary about it so that the criminals of Swellview to take advantage of it. Danger Force heads out to fight different criminals. After flashing back to Minyak spoiling every movie, a phone notification appears as Danger Force puts Captain Man in the restraining board reminding him that his departure means that Minyak gets the Man's Nest and a claim that his ban from Mom Con has been lifted. Captain Man breaks free as Danger Force works to restrain him. Captain Man is then placed in a biocryonic chamber as Minyak claims that his desire to join Mom Con will burn him about. It is then revealed that Minyak had bought Mom Con with Schwoz's gold. ShoutOut tells Brainstorm to invite his parents to Hip Hop Puree. At Hip Hop Puree, ShoutOut is there with Schwoz poses as Harold Rosenschwoz to show off the Jackson Pollock painting as part of a plot to get Vice Mayor Willard (who is in a close helmet due to Celia keeping him off colored drinks for a while) to live the tax rule while AWOL works to keep Captain Man from leavin the Man's Nest. It turns out that Celia knew about Bose ruining the painting and she is not angry. Willard is persuaded to write a new law for Judge Tootie to approve that would enable Captain Man keep the Man's Nest. As Willard writes his new laws on napkins, she approves of it as long as Captain Man has not left the Man's Nest before it is legal. Danger Force arrives with Judge Tootie declaring the law legal much to the dismay of Minyak. Captain Man goes to Mom Con and Judge Tootie takes her leave. Minyak admits defeat as AWOL, ShoutOut, and Volt attack him with paintball guns as Minyak states that he did not do anything illegal. Guest stars: Carrie Barrett as Mary, Timothy Brennan as Vice Mayor Willard V.O., Kapri Ladd as Judge Tootie, Siobhan Murphy as Celia, Mike Ostroki as Dr. Minyak, Winston Story as Trent
| 45 | 19 | "Street Fightin'" | Evelyn Belasco | Angela Yarbrough | May 19, 2022 | 219 | 0.24 |
At Hip Hop Puree, Bose is trying to pick a Puree from the samples when he is attacked by Crank where he is doused by trout pot pie puree. Moments later, Chapa and Bose arrive where Ray, Mika, Miles, and Bose learn about what happened. Ray leads his students into confronting Crank at Hip Hop Puree much to the dismay of Miles. Upon arrival, Ray confronts Crank upon the arrival of Crank's mother Debbie who went to elementary school with Ray and tickled them until he urinated. Debbie reveals that she teaches a school about street fighting as Ray plans to go up against her students at the Swellview Children's Street Fighting Tournament that is sponsored by the Swellview Police Department and held in the basement of the First Church of Swellview. The losers of the showdown will not allowed to show their face at Hip Hop Puree again. At the Man's Nest, Ray, Chapa, Mika, Miles, and Bose train for the upcoming match against the Chain Gang where they cannot use their powers as this fight will be nothing like their fight against Lilith and Big Beard's pirate crew. Schwoz helps out as he used to be a street fighter until the incident. Following a musical montage and a fitting of street-fighting outfits, Ray leads his students into the tournament where they operate as the Disco Dragons. The Disco Dragons fight their way past the Shirtless Cowboys and the Left Behinds while the Chain Gang fight their way past the Bling Kings and the Grade Skippers until the Disco Dragons and the Chain Gang remain. The Chain Gang starts to overwhelm the Disco Dragons until the Disco Dragons start to turn the tide where Chapa and Crank are the last two standing. Chapa manages to knock down Crank as she is tempted to zap him. Because of an emergency call, the Disco Dragons had to forfeit. Sometime later, the Chain Gang talk about their victory as Ray tries to talk Chapa out of attacking Crank. Thanks to the Chain Gang violating the take only one mint rule, Ray allows Chapa to turn into Volt to fight them. Ray sees Volt going too far offscreen and starts to turn into Captain Man to intervene.
| 46 | 20 | "Chapa's Phone Home" | Michael D. Cohen | Adrian McNair | May 26, 2022 | 220 | 0.28 |
At SW.A.G., Chapa shows up with Schwoz as the substitute teacher who does not take guff while Ray took everyone else on a field trip which turns out to be a trip to Pear Store to get the new Pear Phone with new features and chargers. Chapa is still wanting to find the boy who stole her phone and dispose of them. Mika and Schwoz reveal that they created a robot called Waste-E who eats E-Waste as a way to avoid Ray from throwing old E-Stuff into the wetlands. Later that day, everyone else is enjoying their new Pear Phones as Chapa is advised to look for her phone. Waste-E returns from eating E-Waste and falls down the stairs. One of the stuff that fell out of Waste-E's mouth was Chapa's lost phone as Bose faints. Chapa verifies it where it has the cover of Will & Grace season 2. This enables Chapa to get caught up with her phone. Ray finds out about it and also faints. Because of Miles bringing it up, Chapa still wants to take vengeance on the boy who stole her phone as everyone tries to get her to drop it to no avail as Mika prevents Waste-E from revealing where he found it. Chapa uses Tiny Ray to threaten Mika into revealing where Waste-E found the phone in exchange for not having Tiny Ray drop her phone in spicy chocolate milk where the current Pear Phones are not immune to it. Using Waste-E's E-Waste consumption record, Mika tracks down the location to Ray's bedroom in the Man's Nest, causing Chapa to angrily zap Ray. Bose admits that he was the boy who took the phone, causing Miles to faint. It turns out that it was stolen 8 years ago when they were playing in the ball pit at Duke E. Dawg's where a younger Bose tricked Chapa's phone claiming that he wanted to video chat with a puppy because he left his phone at home until Celia took him away before he can return it so that she can have her date with Vice Mayor Willard. Charlotte later contacted Bose to bring Chapa's phone to the desert and how he was scared off during the fight in the desert ("Game of Phones" from Henry Danger). This enabled Bose to remember Chapa and gave it to Ray stating that he was going to give it back when the time was right. Ray claims that he was going to give it back when Chapa controls her rage. When Bose begs for forgiveness, Chapa forgives him and zaps Ray again because she is still mad at him for hiding her phone when he thought she meant him. Ray claims that the lesson is that recycling causes more problems than it solves. Because Chapa charred everyone's phones, Ray states that they can purchase the new Pear Phone model that came out today. Chapa passes on this opportunity as she just got her phone back. Schwoz is accidentally eaten by Waste-E who was trying to eat the remote control he was holding. Everyone laughs at it as Chapa takes a selfie with Waste-E. Guest stars: Gabriel Burrafato as Alejandro, Siobhan Murphy as Celia
| 47 | 21 | "Uncle Hambone" | Evelyn Belasco | Marquita Brookins & Megan Kingsbury | June 9, 2022 | 221 | 0.38 |
At the Man's Nest, Miles works on an ice sculpture called Mount Us-More which disrupts Ray's Man-Tan. Mika states that he is entering the Quint Cities Ice Sculpture Contest which Archduke Fernando has won many times where he declared the Quint Cities Holiday Ponytail Day every time. Mika texts a sneak peek of their sculpture while trash-talking them. Chapa's little sister Sage shows up at SW.A.G. to inform her that Uncle Hambone has died from a space tiger attack on the Moon. Chapa explains that Uncle Hambone is Sage's imaginary friend as Chapa takes her home to support her loss. Later that night, Miles completes Mount Us-More when the power goes out. It turns out that the power is out all over Swellview as Mount Us-More is starting to melt. Archduke Fernando calls up Captain Man stating that he cut off the power in Swellview. Ray would normally ask the mole people to mine the coal to power the Man's Nest, but they are on strike as Ray will not pay them. Mika, Miles, and Bose go to pick up Chapa's house to charge up the power cord of the Man's Nest only to be told that Sage is still heartbroken over what happened to Uncle Hambone making her unavailable. After being informed on what happened, Ray becomes Captain Man in order to break up the memorial for Uncle Hambone where Captain Man recalls the loss of his imaginary friend Bubbles at the hands of an electric shark. Miles picks up Chapa's clone in an attempt to take Chapa's place only for Chapa's clone to break free. As part of her plan, Mika has Miles pick up Schwoz who poses as a used imaginary friend salesman named Beans Tambourines in order to give Sage a new imaginary friend. Captain Man makes things worse by throwing Schwoz out. While distracting Chapa's parents Alejandro and Alejandra, Miles reluctantly goes with Bose's idea to have Tiny Ray pose as Uncle Hambone's ghost in order to get Sage to move on and that he'll always be with her. This actually works and makes Sage feel better. Chapa helps to power the Man's Nest only to find that Mount Us-More has melted. Miles works with the remainder of the ice. By the time of the event, AWOL shows off the ice sculpture of Uncle Hambone as it is awarded 1st place by Judge Tootie much to the dismay of Archduke Fernando. When Judge Tootie asks what they will be naming their Quint Cities holiday, Captain Man and Danger Force decide that its theme will be No Ponytails Day much to the dismay of Archduke Fernando as his ponytail Gideon is cut off of him. Schwoz in the alias of Beans Tambourines approaches Archduke Fernando to offer him one of his patented imaginary ponytails. Guest stars: Gabriel Burrafato as Alejandro, Kayla Corral as Sage, Joe Gillette as Archduke Fernando, Angela Hoover as Alejandra, Kapri Ladd as Judge Tootie
| 48 | 22 | "New School Who Dis?" | Russ Reinsel | Andrew Thomas | June 16, 2022 | 222 | 0.31 |
At SW.A.G, Ray is teaching his students in wrangling the DJ Schwoz clone who is posing as a bad guy. Schwoz comes in and reveals that he created a swarm of insect that are a hybrid of a fire termite, and a hornet. Chapa shakes the can and accidentally breaks it when tossing it to Ray causing all the fire termite-hornets to break free as they begin to eat wood. Because of the infestation, Miss Shapen shuts down SW.A.G. and has Chapa, Mika, Miles, and Bose enroll at Swellview Junior High until further notice. Ray befriends some Moms who have children that attend Swellview Junior High as they hang out at Hip Hop Puree. As Chapa, Mika, Miles, and Bose work to fit in, they witness someone in dressed in the costume of the school's honey badger mascot attacking a student like it has done to other students. After school, Danger Force informs Ray about this incident as Ray reads his Best Moms Group text. They get Ray to listen as the honey badger mascot has attacked different people in the different clubs. Danger Force plans to enter the clubs in order to catch the culprit. Chapa joins the basketball club, Miles joins the rhythmic gymnastic club, Mika joins the fencing club, and Bose joins the chess club as some of its members have had unfortunate encounters with the honey badger mascot. They ask everyone in those clubs where they have not seen the culprit. Ray lies to the Moms that he adopted four children until Schwoz calls him away stating that he tried to get some venomous spiders to deal with the fire termite-hornets only for both species hit it off resulting in the creation of the venomous spider-fire termite-hornet offspring three days later where it webbed up DJ Schwoz. Chapa, Mika, Miles, and Bose have no luck finding a lead in the honey badger until the gymnasium goes off and the honey badger mascot shows up. Moments later, Danger Force is recuperating at the Man's Nest as Ray acts motherly towards them. Mika figures out that the honey badger mascot is attacking anyone the number two of every club. At the suggestion of Mika, Danger Force appears at their events to fool the honey badger mascot. When the honey badger mascot shows up, Captain Man shows up to defeat the honey badger mascot and discovers that it was the mother Corrine as the other Moms were also in it to make sure that their kids stay number one. Captain Man is reluctant to fight the Moms as Chapa, Mika, and Miles join the battle and help defeat them. The mothers get away as Captain Man goes after them. Back at SW.A.G, Schwoz states that he had gotten a bear to eat the venomous spider-fire termite-hornet only for them to hit it off resulting in the creation of the bear-venomous spider-fire termite-hornet. This causes Danger Force to continue attending Swellview Junior High for a couple more weeks. Everyone flees when the hybrid starts waking up from its nap. Guest stars: Jill Benjamin as Miss Shapen, Paige Tierney as Corinne, Nikki Tuazon as Abigail
| 49 | 23 | "Class Action Heroes" | Adam Weissman | Nathan Knetchel & Shukri R. Abdi | June 23, 2022 | 223 | 0.29 |
Continuing from the last episode, Chapa, Mika, Miles, and Bose are still attending Swellview Junior High and doing well as Ray is looking for a three-nut (a peanut with three peanuts in its shell) as Schwoz' hybrid is still inside SW.A.G. Ray later claims to them that there is a crime at Hip Hop Puree which turned out to be Trent and Mary promoting the recently-discovered Captain Man-Go flavor. Miles makes a buck selling sandwiches to his students. Ray poses as Lunch Lady Lisa where he wants Miles to take him to the batting cages to meet up with Bigfoot. Then he poses as Groundskeeper Gus so that he can have Mika fix the Wi-Fi in the Man's Nest. Ray then poses a referee so that Chapa can jumpstart the Man-Scooter. Finally, Ray and Schwoz pose as firefighters and unleashes Sleepy Smoke on the cafeteria so that everyone can watch Genuine Moments. Ray also reveals that Puncher is coming to town and made new clones of Danger Force from sugar and spice to pose as them at school so that Miss Shapen does not find out their gone. Bose later gets the idea for Danger Force to switch places with the clones as they suspect that Ray made up Puncher. The next day, Chapa, Mika, Miles, and Bose attend the assembly hosted by Animal Dan the Animal Man while Captain Man starts to figure out that the clones are in Danger Force's place as Puncher arrives and defeats the clones. Captain Man's fight with Puncher occurs all over Swellview until it reaches Swellview Junior High. Chapa, Mika, Miles, and Bose change into Volt, ShoutOut, AWOL, and Brianstorm to help fight Puncher and easily defeat him. Back at the Man's Nest, Captain Man reprimands Danger Force while sending the clones to clean the Man's Garage. ShoutOut states that Captain Man kept pulling them out of school as Captain Man states that he missed hanging out together. As Brainstorm states that missed a lot of stuff at normal school, Captain Man reaches a compromise with them where they can continue attending Swellview Junior High and that Danger Force will only be pulled out of school if there is an actual crime and not for any other reasons. When Captain Man asks why they did not tell him that they liked Swellview Junior High instead of SW.A.G, AWOL states that Captain Man was always freaking out whenever a truth is told that hurts his feelings. As Danger Force mentions again that they do not like his quiche, Captain Man threatens to blow the Man's Nest sky high as Danger Force works to restrain him. Guest stars: Carrie Barrett as Mary, Winston Story as Trent
| 50 | 24 | "Wedding of the Trentury" | Evelyn Belasco | Shamar Michael Curry & Rachel Wenitsky | June 30, 2022 | 224 | 0.38 |
At the Man's Nest, Ray calls Danger Force in for the wedding episode of Genuine Moments is going to be on when the television is gone. Schwoz brings in the television in a wedding veil so that everyone can watch the wedding episode. As the television is turned on, Mary Gaperman is on the news stating that Trent Overunder is gone as she sadly covers for him. Receiving a call from Hip Hop Puree about Trent crying, Ray sends Danger Force to look into this. When they arrive, Danger Force finds a breaking down Trent who states that his Internet girlfriend Tracy426 wants to get married and how he has to afford a wedding. Having bugged Danger Force's outfits and having overheard them, Captain Man arrives upon firing himself from the Man's Nest in order to keep Danger Force from persuading Trent from having a wedding at the Man's Nest. He wanted to have a wedding of his own wedding at the Man's Nest, but Kris Hart is still married to Jake Hart. Captain Man gives in to the demands when a video of Captain Man's interview with Trent that had Captain Man farting is revealed. Trent broadcasts this on KLVY news and everyone will be in attendance with Mary covering the news from KLVY studios. Danger Force works to put together a Genuine Moments-themed wedding as Trent is impressed with Brainstorm's tuxedo with Captain Man not wanting to pay for the wedding. Danger Force becomes suspicious on Tracy426 due to first-class moves as he shows a picture of her faceless appearances with Trent claims that she is an undercover spy who cannot reveal her secret identity. On the landing, AWOL suspects that Trent might be catfished. AWOL and ShoutOut plan to find someone to pose as Tracy426 just in case Trent is catfished. Schwoz enlists another clone of Kris to pose as Tracy426 after some persuasion involving all you can eat shrimp. When Trent claims that Tracy426 is allegic to shrimp, Volt claims that the shrimp being served is not real shrimp. Captain Man arrives and recognizes the clone of Kris. When the wedding begins with Captain Man preciding over it with help from MarrySomeRandos.com and Tiny Ray and Tiny Kris are in attendance, the real Tracy426 shows up due to her dog's walker having a flat tire. When she asks who the woman with Trent is, Clone Kris eats some shrimp and jumps out of the Man's Nest's window. Trent tries to explain himself as Danger Force confesses that they thought she was catfishing Trent for not showing her face as Tracy426 keeps Trent from confirming her spy job. As Danger Force apologizes for their actions, Tracy426 still wants to marry him when Clone Kris returns to eat more shrimp and wants to marry Trent. This causes Tracy426 and Clone Kris to fight each other without showing her face in front to the cameras until Clone Kris accidentally shoots Trent's hair. In retaliation, Tracy426 kicks Clone Kris out of the window. Then she finally marries Trent. As Captain Man retrieves his fart interview tape from Trent, he drops it and bends down to grab it only to end up farting. He then starts to go after the tapes and cameras as everybody laughs at him. Guest stars: Carrie Barrett as Mary, Winston Story as Trent, Kelly Sullivan as Clone Kris, Krizia Bajos as Tracy426
| 51 | 25 | "Unmasked" | Mike Caron | Dicky Murphy & Adrian McNair and Jake Farrow | July 7, 2022 | 225–226 | 0.22 |
At the Man's Nest, Schwoz gets his phone from within Waste-E in order to contact them. Captain Man and Danger Force arrive where they defeated the bad guys who wanted to steal a prized basketball created by someone named Dunksy and confiscated their phones. They celebrate with a dunk with the prized basketball until Officer Walnut arrives to collect the Dunksy Basketball in order to pull the fingerprints off it in order to identify the bad guys like the one who escaped. After Officer Walnut leaves, AWOL and ShoutOut return and hear that Officer Walnut has the basketball. ShoutOut states that Danger Force's fingerprints are on the basketball stating that the police can find out their identity and can blow their cover. As Captain Man states that they should start a new life in Mexico, AWOL exhausts himself trying to teleport into the evidence locker causing them to sneak into the precinct on Thursday due to the lack of crime. As they sneak in during the Soup Bribe event, Captain Man runs from the Commissioner. The next day, Captain Man does a Plan B where Chapa poses as Delivery Joe until the real Delivery Joe enters. Plan C has Danger Force giving spoons to the police officers to have their spoons as Captain Man turns over the precinct's power. They have a hard time finding it in the dark which does not go well. In addition, the Commissioner is guarding the evidence locker and will not move unless it is for Captain Man. Danger Force convinces Captain Man to see the Commissioner as he drops off evidence of tax fraud. Once the evidence is in, Captain Man lures the Commissioner outside for some soup enabling Danger Force to exit the evidence where Brainstorm nearly drinks the science juice as the bad guy who escaped infiltrates the evidence room and works to keep him from getting away. Captain Man keeps the Commissioner busy with beatboxing as the bad guy gives them an explosive decoy while he escapes. As Volt and Brainstorm work to disarm the bomb, ShoutOut and AWOL go after the bad guy. As the Commissioner does some breakdancing, Brainstorm and Volt sneak out as Captain Man takes his leave. ShoutOut and AWOL follow the bad guy to the roof as ShoutOut redirects the bad guy's parachute to Swellview Prison. ShoutOut's mask is knocked off by steam as Officer Walnut shows up to see her and also unmaskes AWOL surprised with the fact that her nephew and niece are in Danger Force while taking back the Dunksy Basketball. Later, in light of the incident on the rooftop, Officer Walnut now knows that ShoutOut and AWOL are Mika and Miles. Chapa and Bose find out what happened. After advising Chapa and Bose to become Volt and Brainstorm, AWOL and ShoutOut teleport them to their room where they find Officer Walnut bound and gagged. ShoutOut persuades Volt not to zap Officer Walnut's brain and suggests using the Memory Wiper on her and make another one after Drex destroyed it. While Mika and Bose throw off Angela, Volt and AWOL teleport Officer Walnut to Chapa's house where they find Alejandra there after she needed an excuse to leave the Timmy Buffet concert causing Chapa to knock her out and AWOL to replace Officer Walnut's gag. After Mika and Bose throw off Angela, Volt and AWOL bring them to Chapa's house to find Alejandra still knocked out. ShoutOut calls Schwoz only for Ray to answer stating that Timmy Buffet has invited Schwoz to perform as Ray suggests asking DJ Clone Schwoz. They ask DJ Clone Schwoz to make a new Memory Wiper. To make it, Schwoz will need Science Juice causing Bose to recall that it is in the Swellview Police Department's evidence room. AWOL and Brainstorm sneak into the evidence room only to encounter Celia wanting to take out evidence. As AWOL claims the Science Juice, Celia starts to call the police only for AWOL and Brainstorm to kidnap her as well. Angela knocks on the door to ask Alejandra for advice on Mika kissing Bose. She comes in upon hearing Officer Walnut causing Danger Force to tie her up as well. Officer Walnut works to free herself as Ray calls Danger Force to pick up some carrots for Garrett the Parrot. Alejandro arrives in the driveway causing AWOL to evacuate everyone. DJ Clone Schwoz completes the Memory Wiper at the Man's Nest as Ray returns causing him to be bound as a precaution. AWOL comes clean about what happened as Ray covers up his appearance in the Man's Nest. As the Memory Wiper actually created a Truth Ray and affects everyone in the radius of the blast except DJ Clone Schwoz, Officer Walnut gets free as Danger Force ends up revealing their identities when asked by her. This surprises Angela, Alejandra, and Celia as they declare that their children are now out of Danger Force. Guest stars: Gabriel Burrafato as Alejandro, Nakia Burrise as Angela, Dayna Dooley as Officer Walnut, Sitara Falcon as The Commissioner, Angela Hoover as Alejandra, Siobhan Murphy as Celia

=== Season 3 (2023–24) ===
| No. overall | No. in season | Title | Directed by | Written by | Original release date | Prod. code | U.S. viewers (millions) |
|---|---|---|---|---|---|---|---|
| 52 | 1 | "The Force Returns Part 1" | Mike Caron | Christopher J. Nowak | April 20, 2023 | 301 | 0.15 |
90 days have passed since Officer Walnut revealed the identities of Danger Force to their mothers. Members of the Cell take advantage of Danger Force's absence as Number 1 tells Number 20 that the person Captain Man is tracking is coming. Ray tries to convince Alejandra, Angela, and Celia to let their kids be superheroes to no avail. Bose is working as a goat herder, Miles has started a community of like-minded individuals, Mika tries to secretly fight crime at night as a persistent Angela keeps thwarting her, and Chapa is arrested 20 times. Angela leaves Herman and Miles to be watched by Alejandra since Celia has not responded to Angela's texts. Trent and Mary report on the abduction of different mothers with Celia being the latest one that was abducted. Chapa informs Mika, Miles, and Bose that Alejandra has gone missing. Herman comes in and informs them that Angela has gone missing. Chapa, Mika, Miles, and Bose go to visit Ray where they blame him for the mother abduction as he denies it. At Schwoz' advice, Ray admits that he secretly implanted tracking devices on all the mothers much to their dismay. Schwoz finds that the trackers are not working as he finds that more mothers are being abducted including Trent and Mary's mothers. Dr. Spleen tells Trent about how long the motherly energy can remain as Captain Man attacks him. Schwoz invents a device that can enable Miles to teleport the remaining mothers in Swellview to the Man's Nest's basements. It works until the machine is hacked into by Number 20 to send the remaining mothers to the Cell much to the dismay of Captain Man. Mika suggests that Danger Force should go find them. Schwoz gives them their gum as Chapa, Mika, Miles, and Bose transform into Volt, AWOL, ShoutOut, and Brainstorm as they prepare to find the missing mothers. Guest stars: Carrie Barrett as Mary, Gabriel Burrafato as Alejandro, Nakia Burrise as Angela, Antonio D. Charity as Herman, Angela Hoover as Alejandra, Siobhan Murphy as Celia, Winston Story as Trent
| 53 | 2 | "The Force Returns Part 2" | Mike Caron | Jake Farrow | April 27, 2023 | 302 | 0.20 |
Continuing from the last episode, Captain Man and Danger Force go to look for the missing mothers. Meanwhile, Angela, Alejandra, and Celia learn that their absence will cause Swellview to fall apart as confirmed by Number 20 as Angela secretly uses her ring to start digging. Soon, Swellview starts to fall apart as reported by Trent and Mary. Vice Mayor Willard appears on the news stating that he is resigned without his wife which also caused Judge Tootie, the Commissioner, Firefighter Jim, Firestarter Pete, Kevin Durant's brother Commander General Darren Durant of the Swellview National Guard, Animal Control Director Chip Munkski, City Councilman Billy Noble, Police Chief Fressica Goodman, City Attorney Crystal Clear, City Manager Dossman Kindheart, Treasurer Cierra Money, Public Health Director Jake Lively, Admiral Nis Chrowak, and Warden Knetchel to also resign without their maternal figures causing corrupt officials to start appearing as their replacement. Celia was revealed to have escaped using her ring as she makes it to the Man's Nest. She cannot tell them where the mothers are as she forgot. She does recall that she snuck out while Number 20 preventing the others escape by blocking the hole with a large poster of Channing Tatum. Finding a hard shell taco that Celia bought from a cave hermit near the swamp filled by swamp monsters, ShoutOut traces the mothers to Thomas Crapper Prison as Captain Man leads Danger Force to rescue the mothers. 15 minutes later, Number 20 has punished Angela and Alejandra by aging them in the special massage chair that drains their mother energy. In the nick of time, Captain Man and Danger Force arrive for the rescue. Captain Man baits the mothers into following them by destroying the Channing Tatum poster. Number 20 injects himself with the mother energy enabling him to make clones of himself. At the blessing of Angela and Alejandra, Danger Force uses their powers to fight Number 20. Volt and ShoutOut combine their powers to defeat Number 20. Thomas Crapper Prison begins to collapse as Danger Force evacuates Angela and Alejandra. Trent and Mary report on the news of the return of the mothers and the reinstatement of the resigned officials who received help from Judge Loophole. Angela, Alejandra, and Celia are persuaded to let Danger Force stay together. Captain Man rejoices and accidentally wrecks the Channing Tatum poster further. Meanwhile, Number 1 mentions that Number 20 is still alive as he tells the rest of the Cell that "he is coming" and that this is not over. Guest stars: Carrie Barrett as Mary / Mary's Mom, Timothy Brennan as Vice Mayor Willard, Nakia Burrise as Angela, Angela Hoover as Alejandra, Siobhan Murphy as Celia, Winston Story as Trent / Trent's Mom
| 54 | 3 | "Big Dynomite" | Leonard R. Garner Jr. | Samantha Martin | May 4, 2023 | 303 | 0.15 |
At Swellview Junior High, its students are sad because of the discontinuing of the Choco Crocos as Principal Stonks is saddened upon hearing it from Chapa and Mika. Miles and Bose procure the final bag of Choco Crocos to share with Chapa and Mika. They soon meet a new student named Buddy Fudgers who trips over the concrete banana. Chapa and Mika suspects that Buddy Fudgers is Lil' Dynomite as Miles and Bose object. There is a bet where the winner will get the last two Choco Crocos. Later that day, Ray claims that he does not remember Lil' Dynomite and gets in on the bet where he'll get the crumbs. Upon being persuaded by Mika, Ray works to get a date with Buddy's mother Credenza as they find that they have things in common. The next day, Danger Force learns that Ray's date with Credenza is a success as he is now in love with Credenza where he failed to obtain information on whether Buddy is Lil' Dynomite or not. Later that day, Ray, Chapa, Mika, Miles, and Bose are at the Fudgers' house where there have been claims that Buddy resembles Lil' Dynomite. Chapa, Mika, Miles, and Bose take their leave with a pottery class cover-up and Ray's 9:45 PM bath. The emergency that Danger Force responds to is a boy named Blayne Kirkpatrick who was paid by Lil' Dynomite to lure Danger Force with a fake emergency. Lil' Dynomite claims that he plans to get revenge on Captain Man by becoming local. After Brainstorm leaks the information about Captain Man taking a bath, Lil' Dynomite traps Danger Force in sticky string and takes off to have his revenge on Captain Man. Danger Force struggles to get free from the sticky string as they get Handsome Sam to get the scissors in ShoutOut's pocket to get them out of the sticky string. After interacting with a songbird, Lil' Dynomite crashes Captain Man's 9:45 PM bath. After figuring out how to use the scissors, Handsome Sam trips over the concrete banana where the scissors go into AWOL's leg enough for it to painfully free his arm as he teleports the rest of Danger Force out of the sticky string. They confront Lil' Dynomite as he plans to shoot him into outer space as the secret identities are revealed and succeeds in not shooting Captain Man into outer space as he confirms their claim. Ray and Buddy agree not to tell Credenza about their secrets in exchange for Ray not breaking his mom's heart. They both embrace each other. Brainstorm's ringtone goes off as AWOL passes out due to still having the scissors in his leg. Guest stars: Hayley McCarthy as Credenza, Mitchell Berg as Buddy Fudgers / Lil' Dynomite, Ryan-James Hatanaka as Handsome Sam
| 55 | 4 | "Guardians of the Ponytail" | Leonard R. Garner Jr. | Nathan Knetchel | May 11, 2023 | 304 | 0.09 |
Danger Force is using Jeff as a human pinata to get back the candy he stole as a disguised Schwoz partakes in the event. When Chapa calls Ray to partake in the event, he is partaking in a "date" with Henry. While driving in a car, Ray tells Henry about his date with Credenza Fudgers and Lil' Dynomite's reform where Henry mentions that he is dating a woman named Melanie. Credenza and Melanie call up Ray and Henry who do not want them to obtain gifts. To raise the money, Ray wants Henry to rob a bank only for him to make it Plan B due to a freelancing job he is partaking in. Back at the school, they meet Duke Wellington who claims that Jeff wants his ponytail named Patrice to give to Archduke Fernando who lost his ponytail Gideon for good. He will pay Danger Force $50,000.00 to protect his ponytail from Archduke Fernando for four days. Lil' Dynomite shows off and offers to protect Swellview for three days. Meanwhile, Ray and Henry are offered $50,000.00 to capture Duke Wellington. Ray and Henry pose as substitute teachers Mr. Learning and Dr. Science to cancel the free day and try to get everyone to nap. When the lights goes off and Ray and Henry grab Duke Wellington, Danger Force transforms as AWOL transports Duke Wellington to the Man's Nest as Lil' Dynomite takes Jeff to prison while Schwoz loses a game of chess to Tiny Ray. Back at the classroom, Danger Force finds that Ray and Henry are working for Archduke Fernando for the money to buy Credenza and Melanie handbags. Volt, ShoutOut, and Brianstorm find out about Ray and Henry's plot and mock their plans. As Ray and Henry begin their next plot, Volt seals the doors of Ray's van as Ray has to pee. Schwoz frees Ray and Henry and offers to help them in exchange for some of the reward money. As Schwoz discusses their plan, AWOL teleports the van up the mountain. Danger Force work to guard Duke Wellington. Ray and Henry ambush Duke Wellington with Schwoz posing as Brainstorm. Once Duke Wellington is brought to Archduke Fernando, they demand their payment as Danger Force arrives. Both sides fight over Duke Wellington until Lil' Dynomite shows up and cuts the ponytail which he gives to Archduke Fernando in exchange for the money to pay Tiny Ray as his girlfriend's ex bought her a handbag. Lil' Dynomite then takes his leave as both sides praise him. Sometime later, Henry meets Tiny Ray as Ray wonders how they are going to get the purses for Credenza and Melanie where they go to wear ski masks and rob a bank. Guest stars: Jace Norman as Henry Hart, Cheryl Texiera as Credenza, Mitchell Berg as Lil' Dynomite, Joe Gillette as Archduke Fernando, Ryan Grassmeyer as Jeff Bilsky, Jack Stanton as Duke Wellington
| 56 | 5 | "Miles Sells His Soul" | Leonard R. Garner Jr. | Shamar Michael Curry | May 18, 2023 | 305 | 0.15 |
Ray learns from Miles that Mika lost a riff-off against her more popular rival Sissy Kranz. She could not do a whistle tone without exposing that she is ShoutOut and now has to carry Sissy's books for a week where she cannot receive help due to the riff-off law. Ray has Miles throw his trash into the Abyss in the Man's Nest because he cannot shoot his garbage into outer space ever since it took out an Internet satellite. The Abyss was opened in the Man's Nest as part of Schwoz' birthday present to rip open the space-time continuum. Arriving at the Abyss, Miles meets a suave demon named Ricardo who offers Miles a deal to help Mika win a riff-off against Sissy in exchange for his soul. The next day, Miles convinces Mika to have a rematch with Sissy where she successfully beats her where Sissy must join Mika as a back-up singer at Kara-Oh-De-Lay-Hee-Hoo. A tired Miles arrives at the Man's Nest and reveals that he sold his soul to Ricardo to help Mika win the riff-off like Schwoz did to obtain a golden jacket. Though Schwoz actually traded some nacho balls for it. As Chapa and Bose try to get Miles' soul back, they get swayed in to a deal from Ricardo in exchange for the same type of golden jacket that Schwoz has. This affects Volt, AWOL, and Brainstorm's fight with an angry old lady claiming to be the tooth fairy who is causing trouble at Hip Hop Puree causing Captain Man to defeat her. Captain Man learns of what happened and tries to get their souls back. He nearly gives in to Ricardo's deal involving a golden jacket before Miles, Chapa, and Bose intervene. As a result, Ricardo states that he can give Miles, Chapa, and Bose their souls back if Ray can defeat him in a ukulele-playing/log-rolling contest where he will claim Captain Man's soul if he wins even though Captain Man is not good at either thing. After mentioning that the old lady that Captain Man defeated was the actual tooth fairy, Trent and Mary report on the upcoming contest where they send their kid reporter and self-proclaimed night owl Lil' Bobby Newser to cover it as Ricardo appears to know Mary. Captain Man and Ricardo engage in the contest where Ricardo starts to do unfair tactics against him. Mika arrives, transforms into ShoutOut, and learns about what happened. She helps Captain Man win the duel by singing "Ave Maria ... Virgo serena". As a result, Ricardo is defeated and taken back into the abyss by his fellow demons enabling Miles, Chapa, and Bose to regain their souls while Captain Man finally receives a golden jacket. Afterwards, Danger Force celebrates with some pizza roles and a group photo. When asked by Chapa how Captain Man managed to get good at both talents during the contest, Captain Man stated that he encountered another demon who offered a deal to make him good a ukulele-playing and log-rolling where his soul will belong to the demon when he dies. It will be impossible as he is indestructible. Guest stars: Carrie Barrett as Mary, Winston Story as Trent, Teshi Thomas as Sissy, James Tolbert as Ricardo
| 57 | 6 | "SwellMelonFest" | Evelyn Belasco | Sam Becker | May 25, 2023 | 306 | 0.19 |
At Swellview Junior High, Bose is walked through the proposal to attend SwellMelonFest with Kennedy. Buddy is hiding in the dumpster trying to avoid his mother who wants him to date a cringe girl. Miles is dating Stacy Leonard, Mika is dating Jordan Perez-Worthington, and Chapa is dating Scar. Ray takes SwellMelonFest away from them so that Danger Force has to work security as SwellMelons only bloom every 20 years and that "edible threats" have been issued. Schwoz harvests diamonds from the Man's Nest diamond mine in an attempt to find a heart-shaped diamond for Credenza. At SwellMelonFest, Danger Force does surveillance there as their dates are seen with each other. During this time, Number 18 of the Cell is told by Number 1 not to attack Danger Force yet. Buddy is told by Danger Force about what Captain Man set her up as Credenza had found him in the dumpster and set her up with a cringe girl. Schwoz continues to look for a diamond as he calls Captain Man about a fossil that he found. The only way Danger Force can get out of security detail is to either catch any trouble maker or the SwellMelon Ball drops. They proceed to bust anyone who break the rules and lock them in SwellMelon Jail. Then they catch Ray with Credenza displeasing Danger Force as they lock them up in SwellMelon Jail for breaking the rule of wearing matching T-shirts after releasing the other rulebreakers. At the Man's Nest, Number 1 and Number 19 sets off the burglar alarm. Before Danger Force can assume their civilian identities, AWOL goes to investigate the burglar alarm where he is ambushed by Number 19 as he and Number 1 member begin their infiltration of the Man's Nest. The rest of Danger Force fight Numbers 18, 17, and 16 of the Cell. AWOL regains conscious and goes to aid Schwoz. He takes out Number 19 out only to be ambushed Number 1. Number 19 claims the fossil that tells that "he is coming". Volt charges up a hammer to knock them down as the Cell members get away by blowing up the SwellMelon ball. Danger Force is approached by the dates of their civilian identities as they kiss each other under the remnants of the SwellMelon ball that Brainstorm reassembles. Then they head off their separate ways. Unbeknownst to Danger Force, the Cell have made off with Schwoz and the fossil. Guest stars: Cheryl Texiera as Credenza, Mitchell Berg as Buddy
| 58 | 7 | "Hey, Where's Schwoz?" | Jace Norman | Nick Dossman | December 25, 2023 | 307 | 0.32 |
Continuing from the last episode, Schwoz warns the Cell that Danger Force will come for him. At the Man's Nest, Captain Man and Danger Force are unaware that Schwoz is missing as they take out the taco bar before them. As two weeks pass, Schwoz works on a map-like device for Number 1 and that would lead them to the prophecy as Danger Force is still unaware that he is missing as they engage in different activities including one that Buddy partakes in. Finally realizing that Schwoz is missing as Buddy tries to fix the Man Nest's Internet, Captain Man and Danger Force are caught by surprise when Frankini shows up as Number 8 of the Cell. After having been in their ranks, Frankini informs them that the Cell is made of criminals who want to use the prophecy to bring about the end of the world and that he left their group because of it and not a new piece by Lin-Manuel Miranda. Frankini tells them about the location of the meeting while donating his Number 8 costume that will be used to infiltrate the Cell. An audition is held for the role of Number 8 and Brainstorm wins the part. He is given his fancy lines from Frankini as AWOL teleports Frankini to Casablanca. Arriving at Hip Hop Puree, a disguised Brainstorm attends the meeting held by Number 1. Brainstorm accidentally blows his cover and is kidnapped. Captain Man revealed that he placed a tracker on Brainstorm to track him back to the Cell's hideout. Once AWOL returns, they will raid the Cell's hideout. Unfortunately, Schwoz did not put batteries in the tracker. At the Cell's hideout, Number 2 throws Brainstorm near Schwoz who finds the tracking device in Brainstorm's ear. Back at the Man's Nest, Buddy had placed fresh American batteries in the tracker. Soon, Captain Man and the rest of Danger Force proceed to head to the Cell's hideout as they fight Numbers 1, 2, 7, 9, 12, 14, 15, and 16. Once Numbers 1, 2, 7, 9, 12, 14, 15, and 16 are down and ShoutOut frees Schwoz, Volt proceeds to plan to bring the lair down only for more Cell members to show up. This causes AWOL to teleport Captain Man, Danger Force, and the cave painting out of the Cell's lair. Back at the Man's Nest, Schwoz is pleased that he was rescued even though it took two weeks for it to be done. Captain Man and Danger Force learn about the device that Schwoz built them. Back at the Cell's lair, Number 1 tells the rest of the Cell that they have the beacon and that "he is coming". When Number 1 turns it on, an explosion happens. Back at the Man's Nest, Schwoz revealed that he built a bomb to destroy the Cell's lair. Before he can have the two week old food, Schwoz is told by Captain Man to fix the Wi-Fi. Once that is done, the holographic monster Gorch appears and attacks Captain Man, Volt, ShoutOut, and Brainstorm as Schwoz quotes "It's good to be home". Guest stars: Mitchell Berg as Buddy, Frankie Grande as Frankini/Number 8
| 59 | 8 | "Dumber Force" | Michael D. Cohen | Marquita Brookins & Megan Kingsbury | January 24, 2024 | 308 | 0.08 |
As Captain Man and Danger Force throw a party thinking that the Cell has been defeated much to the objection of Mika, the Cell is cleaning up after the bomb as Jeff is revealed to be Number 24601. Knowing that Danger Force lives in Swellview, Numbers 1, 10, and 12 has Jeff go on Mitch's show pitching an idea to buy Swellview Junior High in exchange for a lower number rank. Once that was done, Mitch starts restructuring it by having Bose graduated, not having fancy words used, all wrong answers being the right answers. Watching from a hidden camera, Numbers 1, 10, and 12 state that Danger Force will be too dumb to stop crime. They tell Jeff who is interacting with the Cell member Number 11 (who is revealed to be a caveman named Grog) that he must do his test crime. Meanwhile, Schwoz ropes Ray into building the same device that the Cell had him build when a dumber Chapa, Mika, and Miles appear as Ray. Ray and Schwoz find that Bose has graduated when the Man's Nest receives an emergency call regarding Jeff robbing KLVY. As Volt, ShoutOut, and AWOL are too stupid to go through the door, Captain Man and Brainstorm briefly catch Jeff until he throws the cactus at Volt, ShoutOut, and AWOL who keep catching it. Numbers 1, 10, 11, and 12 celebrate the outcome. The next day, Bose meets with Mitch to talk about how his friends are getting dumber. Displeased with the criticism, Mitch has the students drive Bose away. Ray and Schwoz find out what happened from Bose as they work to come up with a plan until Schwoz pitches an idea to punch some sense into them using Brain Boppers loaded with smart serum. Later that night, Captain Man and Brainstorm bait Chapa, Mika, and Miles where they punch them with the Brain Boppers. This restores their intelligence as they transform into Volt, ShoutOut, and AWOL while given the same Brain Boppers. They crash Mitch's burrito-making class in the teacher's lounge as they make the students smart again with the Brain Boppers. Afterwards, the students are sent home and Mitch avoids arrest by claiming that there's no law against buying a school and making students dumb. As Captain Man and Danger Force head back to the Man's Nest, the Cell learn that they are building the device for them. Back at the Man's Nest, Ray, Schwoz, and Danger Force operate the device and find that it makes a flapjack. When Mika asks why the Cell went through a lot of trouble to make a device that makes pancakes, Bose finds that the blueprints are incomplete and suspects that there's a second page somewhere. As Schwoz claims that the second page is with the Cell, Bose claims that the device will be much more evil if it is obtained. Ray states in suspense that the flapjacks are actually pancakes as everyone rants to him about scaring them like that. Guest stars: Carrie Barrett as Mary, Andrew Linus Caldwell as Mitch Bilsky, Ryan Grassmeyer as Jeff Bilsky, Winston Story as Trent
| 60 | 9 | "Don't Go In There!" | Evelyn Belasco | Emma Samocki & Crystal Yniquez | January 31, 2024 | 309 | 0.10 |
Continuing from the last episode, Chapa and Bose are mining for a heart-shaped diamond that Ray needs for Credenza beneath the Man's Nest while Schwoz is supervising. Then they end up in a dance break where Ray sends Mika and Miles to break up the dance break. When a support beam is kicked, they find another cave drawing involving the blueprints for the second part of the device. As Danger Force goes to the sushi room, Mika notices a red door that they have not seen before. Ray shows up where he does not want them to go through the door. Later that night, Mika and Miles sneak back into the Man's Nest as they find that Chapa and Bose have arrived first and each of them wants to go through the red door. Upon caving, Mika tries to open it only to be shocked. A predicting pre-recording of Ray is shown where he reveals that he had a teleport-proof titanium alloy placed on the door and that they will never get through the red door. In retaliation, Miles uses his cardboard cut-out Harlito who leaves a bunch of boxes. He finds a red box as he falls for the same pre-recorded message from Danger Force. Schwoz calls Danger Force stating that he has completed the blueprints as he hears about the red door that Danger Force wants to get through. He cannot tell them because of a doomsday bomb that Ray placed in him. Ray re-enters as he is tempted to open the red box as Danger Force talks about all the stuff from the gross stuff in the red box. An explosion is heard as Ray reacts to the jolly beetle tears that weakens him. The antidote for the jolly beetle tears is behind the door in question. When they finally open the door, they find a look-alike Credenza and Buddy inside with a dog named Lickums. Chapa states that they work for a disturbed man as the door closes behind them. It turns out that Credenza, Buddy, and Lickums are robots and that the room is power-proof thanks to the books written by Jake Hart and Schwoz. When Lickums declares Danger Force as intruders, they work to defend themselves from the robot look-alikes without their powers. Lickums fights well due to a book written by Chapa with a foreword by Jackie Chan. When Danger Force gets the antidote, they defeat the robot look-alikes and exit the room. Moments after Ray is cured, Schwoz reveals that he completed the device as Danger Force understands what it would look like if Ray had a family life. Bose gives him a book about being himself which also had a foreword by Jackie Chan. Ray and Danger Force see the device that Schwoz constructed from both parts, though it glitches in front of Ray and Danger Force who leave to get pancakes. When Schwoz adjusts the device, it sends out a light beam which is witnessed from afar by Number 1 and Number 10 of the Cell. They note that Danger Force built the beacon for them as they quote that "He is coming". Guest stars: Mitchell Berg as Buddy / Robot Buddy, Cheryl Texiera as Credenza / Robot Credenza
| 61 | 10 | "Bose's Birthday Party" | Adam Weissman | Nathan Knetchel | February 7, 2024 | 310 | 0.08 |
Today is Bose's birthday. As Miles blows up a balloon, he states that he is trying to get a date with Sissy Kranz and claims that she has turned amend and has posed as AWOL for Cat Holder Magazine where a bunch of girls have been sending him texts. Because Vice-Mayor Willard and Celia have their anniversary on his birthday, Bose never had a proper birthday party. Ray states that he and Credenza will be spending their date at The Wicker Inn as he claims that it will not burn down. Bose arrives stating that his stepsister Poopsie likes AWOL. Ray still wants Schwoz to find him a heart-shaped diamond to propose to Credenza despite him reworking the Cell's device as a party light. While setting up the birthday at Buddy's house, Chapa wears a clown mask after losing a bet with Blayne Kirkpatrick. When Bose arrives, everyone says surprise and throws him a birthday party. Miles interacts with Sissy as Willard drops Poopsie off at Bose's birthday party which he does not care about so that he and Celia can go to The Wicker Inn as he also claims that it will not burn down. He calls up AWOL to come to the party to be with Poopsie or else he will shut down the party. With AWOL in a pickle, he must go back and forth between being with Sissy as Miles and being with Poopsie as AWOL. Meanwhile, Schwoz has no luck finding a heart-shaped diamond until he receives help from a mouse who also helps him prepare for the "ball". With Poopsie constantly breaking items with no AWOL present, Miles persuades Mika to hang with Sissy. A news broadcast is played where Lil' Bobby Newser talks about the Wicker Inn catching fire, Ray and Credenza will be home as they work to clean the house before they come home. This causes everyone to flee the party when Buddy states that they have to clean up as a raccoon that AWOL mistook for a cat attacks Poopsie as she flees. Sissy returns to lead Chapa, Miles, Mika, Bose, and Blayne into helping Buddy clean up as Mika sees that Sissy has actually turned a new leaf. Following a musical montage, the house is cleaned as Ray and Credenza arrive. Buddy works to cover up what really happened at the house. Unfortunately, she opens a cabinet to find sunflower seeds in it as she figures out that Buddy had a party when Schwoz arrives with the modified invention. Noting that Buddy was trying to make new friends upon moving to Swellview, Credenza says that she sees the light. Just then, a princess shows up having found a diamond slipper that Schwoz dropped in the woods. Schwoz gets his diamond slipper back as everybody starts to party at Ray's suggestion. Guest stars: Cheryl Texiera as Credenza, Mitchell Berg as Buddy, Timothy Brennan as Vice Mayor Willard, Teshi Thomas as Sissy, Channah Zeitung as Poopsie
| 62 | 11 | "Ray Forgives" | Elvira Ibragimova | Sam Becker | February 14, 2024 | 311 | 0.09 |
Schwoz works on making a "Marry Me" filter light for Ray to propose to Credenza. As Credenza has crashed the car into the trash cans, he goes to use the plunger on the dents. Danger Force hears about Buddy and Credenza seeing the third-to-last episode of "Genuine Moments". They work to cover the truth from Ray as Buddy suffers from truth sweats that causes him to admit the truth of where they were. Affected by this revelation, Ray takes Danger Force away as Buddy tells Credenza about Ray's proposal. The next day, Danger Force learns from Schwoz that Ray is listening to depressing music while dressed as an emo. He then declares that he will never love again. Danger Force works on a way to get Ray to forgive Credenza in 48 hours or else they will break-up according the Break-Up Law which his mother went through three ex-vices before marrying Vice Mayor Willard. Buddy informs them that Credenza is wearing her new pink dress and is going to go out with her female friends. Miles suggests they go through the M.I.L.E.S. system that might help Ray to prepare to forgive Credenza starting with getting Ray to forgive Drex. Upon luring Drex to Hip Hop Puree with a promise for a lizard hand removal, Miles tries to get them to do step 1 which is Manage Expectations. Ray and Drex's fight lasts for hours as part of step 2. Both of them lose their anger towards each other as Miles has them engage in an arts and crafts project as part of step 3. As Ray is prepared to forgive everyone, Drex wants to take this time to make up with his ex as Ray is ready to forgive Credenza. As Ray plans to forgive Credenza at her house, Drex shows up where it is revealed that he is Credenza's ex-husband and Buddy's father which surprises everyone. After Buddy tricks Credenza into going upstairs, Drex learns that Credenza's friends have arrived to take her on a trip to Lil' Miami as Becky will be coming with the party bus which Ray and Drex get weary about her. Mika, Miles, and Bose distract the girls as Ray and Drex fight over Credenza. Buddy tells Drex that he was not a good husband for Credenza due to his villainous activities as Ray has brought happiness to his mom. He tells Drex to let Ray propose to Credenza before Becky arrives with the party bus. Drex prepares to stall Becky so that Ray can propose to Credenza. Ray forgives Credenza and successfully proposes to her. After Becky has done a juice cleanse, everyone runs. Later that night, Number 1 of the Cell meets with his master who turns out to be Credenza. With the heart-shaped ring Ray gave her during the proposal, they can now complete the beacon to fulfill the prophecy as Number 1 and Credenza each state that "He is coming". They both walk out taking the beacon with them. Guest stars: Cheryl Texiera as Credenza, Mitchell Berg as Buddy, Tommy Walker as Drex
| 63 | 12 | "The Battle for Swellview" | Mike Caron | Jake Farrow & Christopher J. Nowak | February 21, 2024 | 312 | N/A |
On KLVY, Trent and Mary mention that a comet is coming as Lil' Bobby Newsome swings by Earth every 2,000 years. Ray interrupts Chapa and Miles' watching the news stating that he will marry Credenza and will retire from superhero work as he sets fire to his Captain Man outfit. Miles assumes that Ray is going too fast for it and that Danger Force will take over for him since Henry left. Credenza enters where she now knows all the secrets. Ray then leaves with Credenza with Drex being his best man. Mika, Bose, and Schwoz find out about the similar cave paintings that tell the story of a hero slayer who is planning to take over Earth with its followers as they find the cave paintings that have the same pictures of the Cell's masks. Just then, Cell members Number 10, Number 12, and Number 19 appear behind Chapa and Miles and shoot them. Chapa and Miles fight the Cell members with stolen weapons as Bose and Mika show up. Numbers 10, 12, and 19 get away. After distracting Ray, Credenza confronts Buddy about his Lil' Dynomite identity as she plans to make use of him. Meanwhile, Schwoz reveals that the mask that they salvaged from the Cell members which records everything including the truth about Credenza. Danger Force figures out that Credenza is playing Ray and head to her house. Upon arrival, they are attacked by Lil' Dynomite who has been lied to by Credenza. Mika shows footage about Credenza's evil plot as he is convinced. Despite their invasion plan, Danger Force and Lil' Dynomite are captured due to the Cell mask still playing as the Cell makes the final preparations involving pizza for the hero slayer as they quote "He is coming". Though Number 19 is annoyed at the fact that all the pizzas are topped with pickles. Using a nearby Swellview Songbird, Lil' Dynamite has it take a message which reaches Ray and Drex. Ray becomes Captain Man as he brings Drex to rescue them. Unfortunately, they were captured as well. Credenza then arrives with Lil' Dynamite annoyed that his mother is evil. She then goes on to talk about the monster as Mika guesses about the Cell's past use to summon a hero slayer where the person who first used it started the Sumerian empire, another one became the first Pharaoh of the Middle Kingdom of Egypt, and now she plans to rule Earth with Lil' Dynomite. The beacon is activated as the hero slayer's smoky form arrives as Mika's latest fact states that it cannot be controlled. It disintegrated Numbers 1, 2, 7, 9, 12, 13, 14, 15, 16, and 19 as Lil' Dynomite is possessed. Drex tries to reason with Lil' Dynomite but is disintegrated as well. Captain Man tries to attack only to be attacked in a way that Danger Force reacts with disgust. Now that Lil' Dynomite is possessed by the hero slayer and has become Dark Dynomite, Danger Force finds that Captain Man has been reduced to a severed head as they keep it preserved in a shrimp cocktail with ice. After Credenza tries to get through to Lil' Dynomite, Danger Force briefly attacks it before escaping with Captain Man's head and body. Back at the Man's Nest, AWOL is still surprised that Captain Man still wants to marry Credenza. Danger Force watches the news as Trent and Mary report on Dark Dynomite is draining souls from everyone as they become literal news anchor. Schwoz works to reattach Captain Man's head. A helicopter arrives as Angela, Alejandra, and Celia fail to zipline down it as they plan to take their children to safety as Vice Mayor Willard is busy overseeing the evacuations to Neighborville. Back at the cave painting, Danger Force works to find a way to change the prophecy so that Danger Force can win as the mothers harvest some diamonds from the diamond mine. Trent and Mary report on the giant-sized teenager as Lil' Bobby Newsome reports from the final shelter of Hip Hop Puree until they are attacked and have their souls taken. At the Man's Nest, Mika has been unable to come up with a plan as Schwoz proposes that they capture the monster and blast it back to the comet when it passes by Earth again. Chapa recalls about the time the Cell drained the Mom energy from their moms so that their powers can be used to defeat the hero slayer. Though Schwoz states that the hairs of Angela, Alejandra, and Celia will go gray forever. Once that is done, Angela, Alejandra, and Celia leave as Danger Force feels the Mom Essence in them as their powers are increased. Credenza arrives with the beacon in order to help Danger Force draw Dark Dynomite to the Man's Nest due to her love for Buddy who she wants to get back. Using the beacon, Danger Force draws Dark Dynomite towards them. Then Danger Force goes on the attack enough to drive the hero slayer out of Lil' Dynomite. Mika then draws the hero slayer's smoky form to her as it enters her body as she unsuccessfully resists possession. The rest of Danger Force work to avoid being possessed and then work to get through to Mika. Once that is done, Mika is freed as she shouts the hero slayer back into its meteor prison. Then AWOL teleports into outer space and punches it away. Everyone is restored to normal including the Cell. Drex's left hand is restored to human form as he chases after the restored Cell members as he is now a good guy. Moments later, Schwoz has successfully reattached Ray's head to his body. He still wants to marry Credenza. The princess who found Schwoz's slipper named Daphne turned out to be an actual princess as Schwoz leaves to go meet her at the airport. With Credenza planning to live on a boat with Ray, Buddy is going to live with Ray as the redeemed Drex comes to pick him up. Ray and Credenza went through the M.I.L.E.S. system with Credenza turning over a new leaf as Ray leaves them with a carving where he and Credenza go down the tube. Just then, an emergency call comes through as Danger Force prepares to fight crime as it zooms in on the carving of the "New Destiny". Guest stars: Cheryl Texiera as Credenza, Carrie Barrett as Mary, Mitchell Berg as Buddy / Lil Dynomite / Dark Dynomite, Nakia Burrise as Angela, Angela Hoover as Alejandra, Siobhan Murphy as Celia, Winston Story as Trent, Tommy Walker as Drex / Big Dark Dynomite

== Shorts ==
| No. | Title | Original release date | Prod. code |
|---|---|---|---|
| 1 | "Secrets Revealed!" | August 8, 2020 | 001 |
With a toxic cloud still hanging over Swellview following the gas leak being stopped at the Bhutt Factory and the quarantine still in effect, Mary Gaperman starts her spin-off "Gabbin' with Gaperman" where she interviews Brainstorm who she claims is the smartest member of Danger Force despite the fact that Frankini wants to get an interview. When Chapa, Shout-Out, Miles, and Captain Man joins the show, they work to keep Brainstorm from revealing the team's secret identities.
| 2 | "Danger Force Troll Smackdown" | August 15, 2020 | 002 |
Mary Gaperman interviews Dr. Minyak on "Gabbin' with Gaperman" where he talk about his faster class that will teach aspiring villains on how to defeat him faster and how he claims that Captain Man cries upon being bested by Minyak. Displeased with what Minyak is saying, Captain Man loses it as Danger Force asks if he is going to take that from him. On a late night edition of the show, Danger Force exposes Minyak's lies. All the truths lure Minyak into the transmission as Captain Man uses the Punch-Through Screen on him.
| 3 | "Leaked Video Pt. 1" | August 22, 2020 | 003 |
As Mary Gaperman is laughing, Trent Overunder reads the news about a leaked secret footage of a light night video chat between Captain Man and Jeff Bilsky where they are wearing tiny shorts, eating peanut butter and jelly with their fingers, playing Fortnite, learning a new Clik-Clok dance, and Captain Man planning to call Drex to claim that Jeff is the best villain in Swellview. After the footage, Jeff appears on "Gabbin' with Gaperman" to apologize for his comment that might've offended Drex while Captain Man vows to find the person who leaked that video. Captain Man speaks to Schwoz and Danger Force about who leaked the video where neither of them have no knowledge of it.
| 4 | "Leaked Video Pt. 2" | August 29, 2020 | 004 |
Suspecting them of leaking the footage, Captain Man leaks various leaked videos of Bose, Chapa, Mika, Miles, and Schwoz on "Gabbin' with Gaperman" to make them pay. They still admit that they did not leak the video as Schwoz gave Danger Force the Punch-Through Screens as they punch him. When Jeff contacts Captain Man, he states that he leaked the video because he looks dope in the shorts and that he will see them tonight. When Captain Man states that they should call this even, Schwoz, Chapa, Miles, Mika, and Bose continue to punch him through the Punch-Through Screens.
| 5 | "Prank War" | September 5, 2020 | 005 |
On "Gabbin' with Gaperman", Mary Gaperman takes questions from the viewers where an expert says that a second cloud will come and that gluing a pickle under their nose would help them. Danger Force is revealed to be behind the pranks on Mary. They find that Captain Man fell for the news. Seeing that Captain Man will fall for any news, Chapa, Miles, and Bose do false news to see if Captain Man will fall for them. When it came to the blue mayonnaise on their faces which Danger Force states that they did not do, it turns out that Schwoz pulled the prank.
