= List of Game Shakers episodes =

Game Shakers is an American comedy television series created by Dan Schneider that premiered on Nickelodeon on September 12, 2015. The series ran for three seasons, with its final episode airing on June 8, 2019. It stars Cree Cicchino, Madisyn Shipman, Benjamin "Lil' P-Nut" Flores, Jr., Thomas Kuc, and Kel Mitchell.

== Series overview ==
Season	Episodes	Originally released	
Season	Episodes	First released	Last released
1	19	September 12, 2015	May 21, 2016
2	24	September 17, 2016	November 4, 2017
3	18	February 10, 2018	June 8, 2019

== Episodes ==
=== Season 1 (2015–16) ===
No. overall	No. in season	Title	Directed by	Written by	Original release date	Prod. code	U.S. viewers (millions)
1	1	"Sky Whale"	Steve Hoefer	Teleplay by : Dan Schneider & Jake Farrow; Story by : Dan Schneider	September 12, 2015	101–102	1.98
After creating a game app called Sky Whale for their science project at Sugar Hill Junior High School, partners Babe and Kenzie start a game company called Game Shakers with their friend Hudson in Brooklyn. However, rapper Double G decides to sue them after finding out from his lawyer Becker they used his new song in the game with no deal having been made. This leads him, Bunny, Ruthless, Becker, Scottie, and those with Double G to confront Babe and Kenzie at Game Shakers. When Babe and Kenzie are unable to pay Double G even after he crashes their science class, he ends up taking possession of everything in the building, thanks to a court order that he and Becker obtained. In order to make things right and seeing that Triple G likes playing video games, Babe and Kenzie take on Double G as their partner and hire his son Triple G as a game consultant. In the final scene, Double G performs "Drop Dat What" at the grand opening of Game Shakers with Babe and Kenzie joining in. Guest stars: Shel Bailey as Ruthless, Regi Davis as Mr. Sammich, Ray Ford as Becker, Bubba Ganter as Bunny
2	2	"Lost Jacket, Falling Pigeons"	Russ Reinsel	Dan Schneider & Richard Goodman	September 19, 2015	104	1.94
When Babe and Kenzie each get their bonus money from Double G, Babe spends hers on a cute jacket that everyone including Mason Kendall likes, while Kenzie buys a watermelon shaped like a cube. When Babe loses her jacket on the Subway, she and Kenzie look for it in the subway's 'lost and found'. They do not find it, and Babe is devastated. Kenzie buys Babe a new jacket with her bonus money. Meanwhile Hudson lets a bunch of Pigeons into the Game Shakers building. After failing to get them out, Double G calls in Bobby Dong and he uses a smoke bomb to put the birds sleep, but it also puts the Game Shakers to sleep. Guest stars: Shel Bailey as Ruthless, Bubba Ganter as Bunny
3	3	"Dirty Blob"	Adam Weissman	Dan Schneider & Sean Gill & Jana Petrosini	September 26, 2015	105	1.81
Babe and Kenzie create a new game called Dirty Blob. After the gang tricks Triple G's latest tutor so he can test out Dirty Blob and Kenzie later reveals this to Double G, Double G tells Triple G if he does any more tricks, he'll be kicked out of Game Shakers and will be sent to a boarding school in Utah. However, when Hudson and Triple G decide to play a game and accidentally break Kenzie's laptop along with a copy of Dirty Blob, the gang must sneak into Double G's office to get the last copy of Dirty Blob before he captures them. Guest stars: Shel Bailey as Ruthless, Bubba Ganter as Bunny, Regi Davis as Mr. Sammich
4	4	"MeGo the Freakish Robot"	Steve Hoefer	Dan Schneider & Jake Farrow	October 3, 2015	106	1.44
The Game Shakers agree to test out MeGo, a robot that is able to learn and do tasks, so they can make a game from it. MeGo winds up liking Hudson and disliking Triple G, resulting in a rooftop showdown, where MeGo lures Triple G to the roof and tries to throw him off, so that it can be Hudsons best friend. Frustrated with MeGo, Double G tosses MeGo off the roof, where it smashes on a car below. MeGo's parts are collected into a shopping cart and given back to its creators.
5	5	"Tiny Pickles"	Adam Weissman	Dan Schneider & Jake Farrow	October 10, 2015	103	1.60
The Game Shakers have a new game ready called Creature Crunch. When they go on The Helen Show due to an available spot upon John Stamos cancelling his guest appearance, Double G says that their new game is Tiny Pickles, a game based on his recent crazy dream. The company tries to make the game, but it looks bad. Double G then revisits The Helen Show after Bunny and Ruthless remove Matt Bennett from the studio to say that Tiny Pickles is fake. Before he can, Babe, Kenzie, Hudson and Triple G come to the show and reveal that they edited Creature Crunch to create Tiny Pickles. Guest stars: Yvette Nicole Brown as Helen, Shel Bailey as Ruthless, Matt Bennett as himself, Regi Davis as Mr. Sammich, Bubba Ganter as Bunny
6	6	"Scared Tripless"	David Kendall	Dan Schneider & Sean Gill & Jana Petrosini	October 24, 2015	108	1.67
Triple G tries to find a way to outsmart his dad and prank him for Halloween. Both of them enlist the help of Babe and Kenzie in their efforts to scare each other, but the girls go forward with helping Triple G. While the prank involves scaring Triple G with a snake, the girls intend it to be a fake one, but Double G supplies a real one instead. Added to the prank is Babe masquerading as "Wet Bathtub Girl", a movie character that has scared Double G before. The prank works too good, as Double G gets scared again and the snake ends up biting him on the neck. His diagnosis at the hospital does not look good, and the gang sees him flatline. Amidst the sadness in the room, Double G wakes up laughing and reveals he had been planning this for a year, drinking the snake's venom piecemeal and rendering him immune.
7	7	"Trip Steals the Jet"	Russ Reinsel	Dan Schneider & Richard Goodman	November 7, 2015	107	1.63
The Game Shakers borrow Double G's private jet to take Triple G's rich friends Landru and Pompay on a ride while Bunny, Ruthless, and Scottie were sleeping. After the pilots jump out of the jet, the Game Shakers must land the jet themselves. When they land the jet, Landru and Pompay tell Triple G to abandon Babe, Kenzie, and Hudson and to hang out with them instead, but Triple G sticks up for the other Game Shakers and stops hanging out with Landru and Pompay. Afterwards, Babe, Kenzie, Hudson, and Triple G make a run for it to avoid the wrath of Double G. Guest stars: Shel Bailey as Ruthless, Bubba Ganter as Bunny, Jacob Hopkins as Landru, Jackie Jacobson as Pompay
8	8	"Lost on the Subway"	David Kendall	Dan Schneider & Jake Farrow	November 14, 2015	109	1.31
The Game Shakers create a new game called Punchy Face, which reaches Tekmoto, a game company who requests a meeting with the Game Shakers. Due to a taxi parade, Babe, Kenzie, Triple G, and Hudson must take the subway; however, Hudson forgets the boxing gloves, so Babe and Kenzie send him and Triple G back to retrieve them. Unfortunately, Triple G and Hudson end up getting lost and in trouble with Double G. Double G goes to search for them, leaving Babe and Kenzie to stall the company executives at Tekmoto. Babe later improvises by making boxing gloves out of a bra with bread stuffed inside. Tekmoto is highly impressed and makes a deal with the Game Shakers. Guest stars: Shel Bailey as Ruthless, Bubba Ganter as Bunny, Eugene Kim as Doug, Tohoru Masamune as Alan
9	9	"You Bet Your Bunny"	Russ Reinsel	Dan Schneider & Richard Goodman	November 21, 2015	110	1.66
Babe loses to Todd, a competitive boy, at Sky Whale. By itself it's no big deal; however, a bet was made that if Babe won, Todd would have to ride the subway in his underwear, and if Todd won, Double G would have Bunny work for Todd. Babe later challenges Todd to a rematch, but Todd makes it more interesting when he changes the challenge to a game of chicken fighting with two bear zappers, in which two people carry the challengers on their shoulders while the challengers try to knock each other off. If Babe wins, Todd must return Bunny to the Game Shakers; however, if Todd wins, Kenzie must give Todd her pocket weasel. Guest stars: Stuart Allan as Todd, Shel Bailey as Ruthless, Bubba Ganter as Bunny, Grant Palmer as Nate
10	10	"A Reggae Potato Christmas"	Steve Hoefer	Dan Schneider & Sean Gill & Jana Petrosini	November 28, 2015	111	1.60
Double G is hosting a Christmas special as Reggae Potato, and the producers invite the Game Shakers to participate in it. However, it all goes wrong when Double G's head catches on fire during the opening number. In order to keep the show going, the children do in the sketches Double G was supposed to appear in. Ruthless and Bunny later stop Double G in the hallway and put a towel over his head, which puts out the fire on his head before reigniting once again; however, they later find Double G again and turn him upside down and put his head in the sand, which puts out the fire again. Double G manages to make it on stage just as the final song is starting. As the song is ending, his head once again reignites. Guest stars: Shel Bailey as Ruthless, Brian Dunkleman as Bruce, Bubba Ganter as Bunny
11	11	"Poison Pie"	Russ Reinsel	Dan Schneider & Richard Goodman	January 9, 2016	113	1.68
Babe and Kenzie want to make peace with their neighbor, an ear doctor, after he called the police and complained about the noise they make in the shop. They make him a peach pie, which causes him to fall ill and call the police on them again. Meanwhile, Double G and Triple G go next door to see if anything else could have caused the doctor to fall ill. Babe is forced to taste the peach pie so the police will believe that the pie is not tainted, which leaves Babe scared at first because of an unknown event that caused her to hate peaches. However, when she eats the pie, Babe completely forgets her dislike of peaches and ends up liking them. Back at the ear doctor's office, everyone learns that it was not the pie that nearly killed the doctor, but turtle urine in the cucumber water. Guest stars: Troy Blendell as Dr. Loeb, Jeremy Rowley as Jerrold, Patrick Robert-Smith as Officer Manly, Dana L. Wilson as Officer Rogers
12	12	"Party Crashers"	Adam Weissman	Dan Schneider & Jake Farrow	January 16, 2016	112	1.58
Babe and Kenzie meet a girl named Peggy at school, who is having a birthday and wants a party but is sad because she has no friends to invite. As Kenzie decides to come to the party, Babe objects until she discovers from Kenzie that Mason Kendall, whom she has a huge crush on, is Peggy's stepbrother. Babe hopes to spend some time alone with Mason at the party, but Bunny and Ruthless also attend when they hear the two girls are there. It interferes with any chance Babe has of talking with Mason, upsetting her. Meanwhile, Double G wants to spend a Saturday night out with his son, but Triple G is too busy. Hurt over this, Double G decides to spend it with Hudson instead. Guest stars: Shel Bailey as Ruthless, Tanner Buchanan as Mason, Pam Cook as Mrs. Kendall, Bubba Ganter as Bunny, Isabella Blake-Thomas as Peggy
13	13	"The Girl Power Awards"	Adam Weissman	Dan Schneider & Jake Farrow	January 23, 2016	116	1.59
Babe and Kenzie are invited to an awards show, and Triple G and Hudson are sad they can't go, so they dress up like girls. Later at the awards show, Kenzie realizes that the boys are only using this to meet girls. When Babe and Kenzie tie with another pair of girls for the New Business Girls category, the boys want them to wrestle for the trophy. Babe and Kenzie make a plan with the other girls and as they're about to wrestle each other, they change direction and attack the boys. Just then, Double G, Bunny, and Ruthless arrive and Double G states that it's not the girls' job to teach the boys a lesson, it's Bunny and Ruthless's job. Guest stars: Shel Bailey as Ruthless, Tyler Carney as Tyler, Kylierae Condon as Abby, Patrick Faulkner as Stewart, Bubba Ganter as Bunny, Eden McCoy as Crystal, Haley Powell as Jodi
14	14	"A Job for Jimbo"	Nathan Kress	Dan Schneider & Sean Gill & Jana Petrosini	January 30, 2016	115	1.80
Double G gets an opportunity to record a duet with former Queen of R&B, Diana DeVane, but, in exchange, she requests a favor. That the Game Shakers hire her step-grandson, Jimbo, as an assistant. However, as Jimbo is clearly an arrogant and incompetent assistant, they fire him, only for Diana DeVane to renounce the recording, to Double G's dismay. They reluctantly hire Jimbo back, and Double G gets to do his recording. However, due to recent surgeries, Diana DeVane's singing voice is screeching and awful, and nothing like her glory days. However, as Double G had already signed a contract, her agent still gets paid. Guest stars: Shel Bailey as Ruthless, Regi Davis as Mr. Sammich, Bubba Ganter as Bunny, Justin Giddings as Jimbo, Indira G. Wilson as Diana DeVane
15	15	"Shark Explosion"	Nathan Kress	Dan Schneider & Seth Kurland	February 6, 2016	118	1.54
Triple G's mother, Jackie, makes plans to take him to see fireworks on the family yacht, and invites the Game Shakers along. Having joint custody of the yacht with Jackie, Double G objects when he wants to use the yacht to fish for giant squid and discovers Jackie is already on board. Babe comes up with a compromise so everyone can stay on the yacht. Later, when Double G learns that a mega-shark that washed ashore on Fire Island earlier is going to be blown up, he insists that Captain Green take them to it, despite a warning on the radio to stay at least one mile away. When the captain refuses, Double G takes over the boat. Because of the yacht's sudden speed increase Kenzie becomes airborne due to her "poof suit" and Hudson's kite tied to her. After Babe and Triple G separate the kite from Kenzie the kite flies away. Meanwhile, the yacht is within the blast radius of the shark explosion and everyone is in danger as shark chunks impact the yacht. Double G ends up getting hit by a chunk and falls into the water, Jackie jumps in to save him, but almost pushes him back in when he refuses to thank her. When Hudson's kite returns to the yacht, it knocks Double G back into the water, causing Jackie to have to save him again. Guest stars: Shel Bailey as Ruthless, Bubba Ganter as Bunny, David L. King as Captain Green, Amanda Payton as Jackie
16	16	"Nasty Goats"	David Kendall	Dan Schneider & Seth Kurland	February 20, 2016	114	1.68
The Game Shakers find that a hacker has set up their new game, Nasty Goats, online before it has been released. They find that the hacker lives in Alaska and take a trip there. They find a young boy named Lance has hacked the website and he won't take it down unless they get him a date to eat macaroni and cheese with local weather forecaster Sophia Sanchez. The Game Shakers take him to the news station and Sophia and Double G flirt. Double G then lands an interview on the news and promotes Nasty Goats. They ask Sophia to have a date with Lance and eat macaroni and cheese and she agrees. Upon the news of this reaching Kenzie, she brings Lance along while Hudson, Bunny, and Ruthless stay behind to watch Lance's grandmother. Babe and Triple G's plans are foiled when Sophia has to go report in a snowstorm causing Babe to get into Sophia's dressing room to pose as her. Triple G then break Lance's glasses and pass Babe off as Sophia, as Lance can't see without his glasses. His glasses are then fixed and realizes it's Babe. Kenzie then manages to get Lance to take down the "Nasty Goats" game. Guest stars: Shel Bailey as Ruthless, Hilty Bowen as Sophia Sanchez, Bubba Ganter as Bunny, Elisha Henig as Lance, Annie O'Donnell as Nanners
17	17	"Babe's Fake Disease"	Steve Hoefer	Dan Schneider & Sean Gill & Jana Petrosini	February 27, 2016	119	1.44
Kenzie takes Babe to her coding club dinner at Fooders and Babe falls for coding master Scott. They then flirt and it leads to them beginning to date. They go on a date the next night, and Babe sees that he is not her type. She goes back to Game Shakers, where, after an app predicted that Triple G will go bald when he is older, the boys are giving him a treatment to make sure that doesn't happen. Babe finds out that Scott transferred into her science class to be with her more and wants to fake a disease so he will break up with her. The next day, Babe falls asleep in class and Kenzie tells them not to wake her because she has "Sleep Violence Disorder", where if anybody with this gets woken up, they will start sleep violence. Scott wakes her, and she throws him to the ground and throws Kenzie out of the classroom window. They then break up after Babe breaks Scott's collarbone. Guest stars: Regi Davis as Mr. Sammich, Bubba Ganter as Bunny, Anders Westlund as Scott
18	18	"The Diss Track"	Steve Hoefer	Dan Schneider & Richard Goodman	March 5, 2016	117	1.41
Double G learns that his rival Big Vicious has released a diss track towards him. This causes Double G to retaliate with his own diss track, leading Big Vicious to come to Brooklyn to get revenge on Double G even after he called his dog fat with the dog also bring brought along. During this time, Double G is served by Bunny's grandmother at the time when Bunny and Ruthless go on a dude cruise as she is very late at bringing his food. During the fight between Double G and Big Vicious, it was discovered that Big Vicious' dog was pregnant as the Game Shakers enlist a local veterinarian named Dr. Jenkins to help the dog deliver her puppies. After Bunny and Ruthless return from the dude cruise the same time when Double G and Big Vicious make peace, it turned out that the old lady that has been serving Double G wasn't Bunny's grandmother as the old lady runs off. Guest stars: Shel Bailey as Ruthless, Bubba Ganter as Bunny, Harley Morenstein as Big Vicious, Darin Toonder as Dr. Jenkins
19	19	"Revenge at Tech Fest"	Mike Caron	Dan Schneider & Jake Farrow	May 21, 2016	124–125	1.73
The Game Shakers attend TechFest, to premiere their new game OctoPie, which involves using a slingshot to shoot pizzas at a building. They have a giant slingshot built and plan to launch Hudson from it in an OctoPie costume, although tests with a dummy don't go very well. Meanwhile, something escapes from a lab and boards the subway, where the passengers are disturbed by it. At TechFest, Babe and Kenzie talk to the owners of a neighbouring booth, Girls Who Code. Double G poses in the giant slingshot for fans, but someone in the OctoPie costume launches him, wrecking other booths and severely injuring him. At first they think it was Hudson, but Hudson was elsewhere. Double G's arm is pulped and the doctors replace it with a new, trionic arm. At TechFest, they meet the creators of MeGo, who tell them that MeGo has been put back together, but something went wrong and MeGo escaped. The Game Shakers realize that MeGo was the one who launched Double G, to get revenge on him for earlier throwing him off a roof. MeGo lures Triple G and Hudson away, duct-taping Triple G to a wall, and putting Hudson in a sack. He has also restrained Bunny and Ruthless in the same fashion. Meanwhile Double G struggles to use his new arm. Then Babe calls and tells him that MeGo is back. He runs out of the hospital. The Game Shakers (minus Hudson) escape and fight MeGo, with little success. Double G arrives and fights him with his new arm. The Girls Who Code program MeGo to explode. Triple G saves Hudson by pulling him away from MeGo just in time. Guest stars: Shel Bailey as Ruthless, Bubba Ganter as Bunny, Dan Gauthier as Dr. Levitz, Bob Glouberman as Dr. Kotch, Molly Jackson as Jenna, Sydney Mikayla as Shelby

=== Season 2 (2016–17) ===
No. overall	No. in season	Title	Directed by	Written by	Original release date	Prod. code	U.S. viewers (millions)
20	1	"Armed & Coded"	Mike Caron	Dan Schneider & Jake Farrow	September 17, 2016	204	1.56
When Mason Kendall stops by Game Shakers wanting to learn to code, Babe wants Kenzie to tutor him. Eventually, due to Babe's distracting Mason while he is learning, Kenzie decides to continue the tutoring at Mason's place. Babe becomes jealous when she perceives Kenzie's time with Mason as more than just the coding lessons, so she outbids Kenzie for a towel used in a film by Channing Tatum. When Mason's ex-girlfriend Layla appears at Game Shakers and sees a message that Mason made for her using code, the two give their relationship another chance. Seeing them get back together causes Babe to cry, and to give the towel Kenzie wanted to her. Meanwhile, Double G has trouble controlling his trionic arm, just before going to the hospital to have his real arm restored, months after it was damaged by MeGo. Double G is in shock when he sees the arm has atrophied, but the doctors assure him that it will be back to normal with some use and exercise. Triple G and Hudson trick each other into finding bottles of bass milk, as whoever does has to drink it. Guest stars: Shel Bailey as Ruthless, Bubba Ganter as Bunny, Tanner Buchanan as Mason, Dan Gauthier as Dr. Levitz, Bob Glouberman as Dr. Kotch
21	2	"Secret Level"	Russ Reinsel	Dan Schneider & Richard Goodman	September 24, 2016	123	1.57
The Game Shakers are inundated with queries from the public about a secret level in their OctoPie game after Hudson tweets online that one exists. That includes Mr. Sammich, who questions Babe and is willing to change the grade on her recent science test, which received a D, and also Mason Kendall, who asks Babe out to dinner at Fooders. It becomes chaos outside the Game Shakers doors, forcing the gang to lock them while continuing to inform the people outside that there is no secret level. Babe asks for Ruthless's help to escape the lockdown so that she can go on her dinner date with Mason. While at Fooders, Mason tries to get information out of Babe about the secret level, even inviting her to a New York Mets game to get her to talk about it. Seeing that the crowd will not give up on their quest to find the secret level, Kenzie eventually makes an update to OctoPie to include it. When Mason hears about the secret level on the subway, he inquires from the other passengers and leaves Babe stranded with the two Mets tickets. Guest stars: Shel Bailey as Ruthless, Tanner Buchanan as Mason, Regi Davis as Mr. Sammich, Bubba Ganter as Bunny
22	3	"The Very Old Finger"	David Kendall	Dan Schneider & Jake Farrow	October 1, 2016	120	1.36
Babe, Kenzie, Triple G and Hudson visit the King Fuhd exhibit at a museum to get more ideas for their game Psycho Beach Mummies. While at the museum, the Game Shakers see a strong resemblance between the mummy King Fuhd and Double G. Despite being warned not to touch the mummy, Hudson feels its hand and accidentally breaks a finger off. With that finger in the Game Shakers' possession, Triple G believes it is cursed and wants no contact with it, but gets hit by a large monitor after Kenzie rubs the finger over his face. Realizing they need to restore the mummy's finger, the Game Shakers also realize they need a distraction so the museum does not find out, so they bring Double G in disguise. After Kenzie glues the finger back on the mummy's hand, she gets stuck to the mummy, but as the gang tries to unglue her, King Fuhd's head falls off and lands in front of Double G, who is trampled by other youngsters visiting the museum. Bunny and Ruthless destroy the head, leading to a $20 million donation being made to the museum by Double G, in lieu of criminal charges. Guest stars: Shel Bailey as Ruthless, Lisa Foiles as Mrs. Carlton, Bubba Ganter as Bunny, Jaime Moyer as Brenda
23	4	"Buck the Magic Rat"	David Kendall	Dan Schneider & Richard Goodman	October 8, 2016	121	1.61
While on the subway, the Game Shakers are thinking of a new game to pitch to billionaire Walton Groats, but are interrupted by news about a rat on their train, with the passengers intent on killing it. Having experienced the recent loss of her pocket weasel, Kenzie saves the rat and decides to keep it. She names it Buck and experiences some good luck at Fooders. As the Game Shakers pitch their new game Bass Jackers to Groats, he shows no interest until Kenzie has Babe wear a pouch with Buck in it. Groats invests up to $25 million on the game, but then the gang starts using Buck to get more good luck, until Kenzie steps in to stop this exploitation of her pet. When she does, she discovers Buck has a fever. Double G contacts Bobby Dong's sister Betty, who determines Buck is homesick and must return to where it came from. Kenzie tearfully gives up her new pet as she drops it off at a subway station, and shortly afterward, Groats backs out of investing on Bass Jackers. Guest stars: Shel Bailey as Ruthless, Bubba Ganter as Bunny, Brian Kimmet as Walton Groats
24	5	"Baby Hater"	Steve Hoefer	Dan Schneider & Jake Farrow	November 5, 2016	207	1.43
After Double G is told by the police that he can't park his helicopter on the roof of the Game Shakers building, Double G plans to change that by running for Mayor. During the campaign, Double G screams at the sight of a baby due to the trauma he had getting accidentally trapped in the maternity ward the day when Triple G was born. Now Babe and Kenzie must find a way to curb Double G's fear in time for a political speech. Guest stars: Shel Bailey as Ruthless, Bubba Ganter as Bunny, Todd Bosley as Teague
25	6	"Byte Club"	David Kendall	Dan Schneider & Jake Farrow	November 12, 2016	122	1.75
When the Game Shakers hear that superstar gamer Icon is retiring, Triple G becomes frustrated because he wanted to challenge him but never heard back. To ensure Icon responds to Triple G's challenge, Babe texts it from Double G's phone, and Icon indeed responds and accepts, setting up a match at The Hole. Triple G defeats Icon in the match, which leads Icon's sponsor Soba Sportswear to start sponsoring Triple G. He becomes so busy with Soba that he has no time to help with the Game Shakers' Sky Whale update. Burdened by his obligations under Soba, Triple G seeks some way to get out of his contract, and his dad gives him and Babe an idea. At The Hole, a match between Triple G and Hudson is set up, where Babe and Kenzie instruct Hudson to do some trash talking and Triple G to bite Hudson's ear as his anger builds. They put in a fake ear on Hudson's left side, but after the match gets going, Triple G goes for his right ear. Soba fires Triple G for the incident, which resulted in Hudson's needing medical attention. Later, at the hospital, Triple G apologizes to Hudson. Guest stars: Bubba Ganter as Bunny, Donis Leonard, Jr. as Scud, Dre Swain as Roz
26	7	"Babe's Bench"	Adam Weissman	Dan Schneider & Jake Farrow	November 19, 2016	201	1.85
Babe buys a bench to advertise Game Shakers, but the Game Shakers find out that the bench only attracts eccentric hobos and strangers, so they come up with a plan to protect the bench by taking shifts watching it. Meanwhile, Double G tries to get a part in the movie "The Three Dingbats", only to find out that he's voicing the character, not playing it. Later, the Game Shakers take the bench to their office instead of leaving it outside. Guest stars: Shel Bailey as Ruthless, Bubba Ganter as Bunny, Justin Chu Cary as Lumpy, Antony Del Rio as Sausage, Moses Haughton, Jr. as Hatchit, Philip AJ Smithey as Joe, Damon Standifer as Stumpy
27	8	"The Mason Experience"	Mike Caron	Dan Schneider & Richard Goodman	February 11, 2017	205	1.63
Babe finds out at school that Mason Kendall is moving to Florida, and like her classmates, she is sad to hear this news. When Kenzie continues to see Babe devastated later, she turns the virtual reality project that Game Shakers was working on from a ski-jump experience into one about Mason, with Babe's input about what to include in it. After Kenzie finishes coding the experience, Babe puts on the virtual reality goggles at school and cannot get away from her virtual Mason. The other students see it as the latest product from Game Shakers, and it leads to a long line at their headquarters for each to interact with Mason through the goggles, but Babe does not want to give him up. When the real Mason comes by to say goodbye to her, Babe is too busy in the virtual reality to notice. Meanwhile, Double G gives up a jacket that a bird pooped on, and Hudson buys it from him. In doing so, Hudson discovers a glass eyeball believed to have belonged to Ronald Reagan, and Double G seeks to get that eyeball back. Guest stars: Shel Bailey as Ruthless, Bubba Ganter as Bunny, Tanner Buchanan as Mason Kendall, Brian Michael Jones as Roy
28	9	"Bunger Games"	Steve Hoefer	Dan Schneider & Richard Goodman	February 18, 2017	202	1.43
Pop star Kayla Bunger agrees to the Game Shakers' response to make a game involving her. As Kenzie is a big fan of Kayla, she does everything to impress the singer, but it does not go well. Meanwhile, Double G rants online about a clamburger he was served at the Clam Jumper and threatens to boycott the restaurant, enough for him to get banned. After Kenzie shows Kayla a demo of the game about her backstage at the Platinum Music Awards ceremony, which causes Kayla's boyfriend to break up with her, and Kayla to quit the show, Babe persuades Double G to perform in her place by doing a song, hoping it will lead the Clam Jumper to lift his ban. Guest stars: Shel Bailey as Ruthless, Bubba Ganter as Bunny, Brittany Gandy as Kayla Bunger
29	10	"Wedding Shower of Doom"	David Kendall	Dan Schneider & Sean Gill & Jana Petrosini	February 25, 2017	203	1.51
Double G's brother Jordan stops by Game Shakers and announces his wedding to his nephew Triple G, as well as Babe, Kenzie and Hudson. He invites the four to the wedding but not his brother because of an incident involving Double G and Jordan when the two were part of a musical group with their two other brothers. Jordan fears Double G will steal the spotlight at his wedding, but after talking with Double G, the Game Shakers convince Jordan that his brother will keep things toned down, so he changes his mind and invites him. After the wedding, Double G looks up at the sky and hints that it will "rain" at the ceremony, as in a million dollars' worth of money, his present to Jordan, which Bunny and Ruthless are about ready to send from Double G's plane. When Babe finds out that it will be silver dollars falling from the sky, and not $100 bills, she warns everyone to take cover. Jordan and his new bride shelter under a table, but when another guest takes that table to protect himself, leaving the couple in danger, Double G lays himself over them to protect them. Guest stars: Shel Bailey as Ruthless, Bubba Ganter as Bunny, Allison Bills as Marla, Todd Bosley as Teague, Courtney Richards as Jordan
30	11	"Bear Butt Laser Runner"	Nathan Kress	Dan Schneider & Richard Goodman	March 4, 2017	208	1.41
Babe, Kenzie, Hudson, and Triple G are going to have a conference call with a Scottish company called Full Kilt, to pitch a new video game. As TekMoto had already come out with a game they were intending to pitch, Babe, Kenzie, Hudson, and Triple G must quickly come up with a different idea. Babe's idea involves anthropomorphic butts, Kenzie's involves laser hair removal, Hudson's involves a yesterday weather app, and Triple G's involves bear fighting. None of these ideas impresses the others, but when Hudson combines Babe, Kenzie and Triple G's ideas, they get one that works. Meanwhile, Double G is angered that a paparazzo caught him naked in his swimming pool and goes to great lengths to make sure nobody sees it on the Internet. He cuts a huge cable in the Atlantic Ocean, shutting down the Internet worldwide and interfering with the Game Shakers' conference call to Full Kilt. Guest stars: Shel Bailey as Ruthless, Bubba Ganter as Bunny
31	12	"Air TnP"	Russ Reinsel	Dan Schneider & Sean Gill & Jana Petrosini	March 18, 2017	212	1.33
Babe and Kenzie are starting a focus group for their game Unicorn on the Cob to get more feedback on it. After Kenzie's experience at a New York subway restroom, she hears about "Air TnP", a clean restroom locator app. The Game Shakers become part of that and allow people who use their restroom to play Unicorn on the Cob and give feedback. When Kenzie uploads the game's analytics information from one of the Pear Pads into the computer, she discovers someone hacked into the game and locked access to it. Babe and Kenzie later find out it was a teenager named Jake, whose father owns a competing game company, Bodacious Games, and is the only one who knows the code to unlock the game again. Meanwhile, Double G's new album receives harsh criticism online; to show he can take the criticism, he wants those hating the album to say that directly to him at his recording studio, but he ultimately loses his cool. Guest stars: Shel Bailey as Ruthless, Bubba Ganter as Bunny, Austin Trace as Jake
32	13	"Llama Llama Spit Spit"	Mike Caron	Dan Schneider & Sean Gill & Jana Petrosini	March 25, 2017	206	1.53
While dining at a crowded Fooders, and discussing ideas for their latest game Llama Llama Spit Spit, the Game Shakers are dismissed from their table, so another customer can be served. As a photo of that customer is on the restaurant's wall for priority seating, Babe wonders why one for the Game Shakers is not. She arranges to talk with Teague, the restaurant's waiter, about that, with Double G accompanying her, but when he makes insults about Teague's mother, whose photo is on that same wall, the two leave. Babe later attempts to get the Game Shakers photo on the wall herself while Kenzie, Triple G and Hudson distract the customers, which leads to an alarm and nearly getting banned from Fooders. After realizing who they are, though, Teague makes a deal with Babe to have him pose as a co-worker at Game Shakers, which includes a first-time date with a girl he met online. Because of how he described himself to this girl, Teague becomes the Game Shakers "boss", but it is all foiled when Double G reveals who he really is. Guest star: Todd Bosley as Teague
33	14	"Clam Shakers, Part 1"	Steve Hoefer	Dan Schneider & Sean Gill & Jana Petrosini	May 6, 2017	219	1.39
Clam Jumper is set to make a $10 million deal with Game Shakers, with the opening of a restaurant in midtown Manhattan. This includes an opportunity for Game Shakers to promote their latest game Llama Llama Spit Spit to a billboard visible from the new restaurant's location. One problem annoying Clam Jumper is the billboard's current diaper advertisement, and the Clam Jumper's president, Jerry Stone, hopes Babe and Kenzie can rent the billboard for the day of the opening. The girls talk with Mr. Skaggs, the owner of the billboard, but get nowhere with him. Consequently, the two work on hacking the billboard, with Kenzie making a wi-fi bridge and Babe talking to Bobby Dong on how to get it close enough to the billboard to sync a video feed. Meanwhile, Triple G confronts his dad about his continued addiction to Clam Jumper food and has a video on his pear pad to remind Double G of the problem. Triple G loses the pear pad and looks in the lost-and-found at Fooders, where Teague hears about the video and eventually holds the pear pad hostage. The episode ends with Babe using a launcher to get the wi-fi bridge to the billboard, with disastrous results. Guest stars: Shel Bailey as Ruthless, Bubba Ganter as Bunny, Todd Bosley as Teague, Brian Houtz as Jerry Stone, Rachna Khatau as Pam Chowdree, Harry Van Gorkum as Mr. Skaggs
34	15	"Clam Shakers, Part 2"	Adam Weissman	Dan Schneider & Jake Farrow	May 13, 2017	220	1.23
Triple G needs $12,000 to get his pear pad back from Teague, who has been disguising himself and wanting ransom after finding out about the Double G video. When Teague hears about the new Clam Jumper restaurant, he also wants to be a part of its opening, as a country singer. Meanwhile, following their failed attempt of getting a wi-fi bridge over to the billboard, which has since been repaired, the Game Shakers look to an alternative from Bobby Dong, and he shows them a special drone that a person can sit on. Triple G has difficulty with the drone's controls, and it leads to partial damage of the drone, flying it over to the billboard unmanned. The new wi-fi bridge that Kenzie made was unharmed, but Babe decides to sit on the drone with the next attempt. Though fearful of Triple G's navigation, and her falling off the drone, Babe successfully gets the wi-fi bridge near the billboard. The customers get a view of Llama Llama Spit Spit, but because Double G is at the event, having trouble controlling his appetite despite having loads of clam patches on him, he needs to see the video on Triple G's pear pad. It shocks everyone, including Jerry Stone, and nearly blows the deal, but Clam Jumper later releases a commercial that uses the video to their advantage. Guest stars: Shel Bailey as Ruthless, Bubba Ganter as Bunny, Todd Bosley as Teague, Brian Houtz as Jerry Stone, Rachna Khatau as Pam Chowdree
35	16	"Wing Suits & Rocket Boots"	Nathan Kress	Dan Schneider & Sean Gill & Jana Petrosini	May 20, 2017	215	1.40
Double G has a wingsuit that he uses to fly out of helicopters. Triple G and Babe don't think it is a good idea, but they can't stop him. Kenzie got bit by a bush weasel and has to be on special pills that make her hyped up and crazy. While this is going on Hudson is live-streaming everything he does in a day. While Babe and Triple G were watching Kenzie, Hudson got hold of Double G's rocket shoes. Hudson does not know how to work them and loses control. Now the game shakers have to deal with Hyped up Kenzie, and Hudson stuck in the air.
36	17	"Game Shippers"	Nathan Kress	Dan Schneider & Richard Goodman	September 9, 2017	211	1.10
Babe and Kenzie are watching an iCarly marathon while Triple G and Hudson are working on a new game for Game Shakers. Annoyed that Babe and Kenzie are not focusing on the game, Triple G confronts them but ends up being drawn into the marathon. Eventually, Hudson, Double G, Ruthless, and Bunny are all watching the marathon as well and everyone forgets about their priorities, such as Double G missing a concert that he had scheduled. Babe and Kenzie end up staying up all night watching the marathon while everyone else falls asleep. When morning comes, the Game Shakers want to find out whether Freddie was in love with Carly or Sam, but an argument breaks out; Babe believes it was Carly, while Kenzie believes it was Sam. Triple G discovers that Nathan Kress, who portrayed Freddie, is staying at the Four Stevens Hotel in New York. Babe and Kenzie are determined to settle their argument by meeting the actor in his hotel room, but when they cannot get past the front desk, Triple G disguises Hudson as Nathan to obtain the room key. While it gets the Game Shakers into Nathan's room, Nathan catches them and is on the phone with security. The Game Shakers persuade him not to throw them out, then pose the question about whom Freddie was in love with. Since Nathan only portrayed the character, he is unable to give them an answer, leading them to ask for his personal opinion on the matter instead. That also goes unanswered, as Double G unsuccessfully tries his own way to get into Nathan's hotel room, which is followed by security escorting the entire gang out. Special guest star: Nathan Kress as Nathan Kress Guest stars: Shel Bailey as Ruthless, Bubba Ganter as Bunny
37	18	"The One with the Coffee Shop"	David Kendall	Dan Schneider & Sean Gill & Jana Petrosini	September 16, 2017	209	1.23
Feeling that what she does for Game Shakers means nothing to her fellow co-workers after seeing an article that snubs her, Kenzie overreacts and picks a fight with Babe for no reason, even going to the point of taking a break from her. Kenzie takes a job at the Coffee Shop that the gang was hanging out in while Fooders' gets remodeled. Triple G convinces Kenzie to talk with Babe and work out their disagreement. However, Kenzie feels more unwanted at Game Shakers when Babe temporarily hires another coder to replace her. Double G helps Babe realize why Kenzie got upset with her and decided to make things right with her. Babe dresses up as Kenzie at her job to get her fired, then defends her when her ex-boss insulted her. Kenzie accepts Babe standing up for her as an apology despite the fight between them being more of her fault for overreacting and blaming Babe for something she didn't do. Kenzie and Babe end their break from each other. Meanwhile, Double G steals his brother's pet monkey just to get money back from him. Hudson performs gigs at the Coffee Shop while an eccentric (and seemingly obsessive) girl named Candice takes a shine to Triple G. Guest stars: Bubba Ganter as Bunny, Megan Richie as Candice
38	19	"The Trip Trap"	Adam Weissman	Dan Schneider & Alejandro Bien-Willner & Danny Warren	September 23, 2017	216	1.65
When a girl named Shanelle calls Game Shakers, wanting to know about something in Sky Whale, Triple G takes interest in her and decides to video chat about her concern, eventually wanting to meet her in person. Shanelle has no interest in going out with Triple G until she finds out that Double G is his dad. Babe gets suspicious over the whole thing, setting out to prove that Shanelle is just using Triple G. On the day Triple G has surgery for carpal tunnel syndrome, Babe and Kenzie have Bunny schedule a pop-up concert featuring Double G at an elderly home, at the same time as the surgery. Shanelle is by Triple G's hospital bed when she finds out about the concert, but as soon as he falls asleep, she heads to the elderly home, only to get busted by Babe. Meanwhile, Kenzie becomes obsessed with putting glue on her hands after having seen Babe do so. Guest stars: Bubba Ganter as Bunny, Shelby Simmons as Shanelle
39	20	"The Switch"	Steve Hoefer	Dan Schneider & Richard Goodman	September 30, 2017	218	1.35
Double G ridicules Bunny for mistakenly spending $29,000 on a miniature motorcycle. That and Bunny's forgetting to bring Triple G to Game Shakers lead to a switch of "dummies", where Bunny comes to work for Babe and Kenzie, while Hudson works for Double G. At Game Shakers, Bunny ends up breaking Triple G's leg during the test of a new game, wipes Kenzie's computer keyboard of all its letters, and gets the wrong-sized shirts for the company. Meanwhile, Hudson's time as Double G's assistant goes better, as he reorganizes Double G's schedule and handles a breakup with a woman on his behalf. Babe, Kenzie and Triple G become aware that Hudson may never come back to Game Shakers, so they come up with a plan that targets the rapper Two Stains, whom Double G is planning to do business with. Their meeting ends abruptly when Hudson perceives a threat from Two Stains and then goes after him. Double G is set to fire Hudson but suddenly experiences an allergy attack. After Bunny comes to Double G's rescue, he and Hudson switch back to their original employers. Guest stars: Shel Bailey as Ruthless, Bubba Ganter as Bunny
40	21	"Dancing Kids, Flying Pig"	Adam Weissman	Dan Schneider & Jake Farrow	October 7, 2017	213	1.35
After the Game Shakers create a new dance game with 50 different types of dances, courtesy of Triple G and Hudson, and show it to Games in Motion, they learn it's not enough as Games in Motion wants another 50 different types of dances in three days. Meanwhile, Double G's pet pig Sebastian has died and Double G is very upset about it. He later holds a funeral for the pig, but it doesn't exactly go as planned when Babe and Kenzie are in a hurry to finish their dance moves. Babe and Kenzie continue working on their dance moves while at Sebastian's funeral, which annoys Double G. In order for Double G to stop being so sad, Triple G talked with Bobby Dong and had Sebastian turned into a drone, which is used to cause more chaos after Babe and Kenzie's project interrupted Sebastian's funeral. Guest stars: Shel Bailey as Ruthless, Bubba Ganter as Bunny, Roy Abramsohn as J.R., Shawn Law as B.J.
41	22	"War and Peach"	Russ Reinsel	Dan Schneider & Richard Goodman	October 14, 2017	214	1.13
When Hudson mentions his birthday after the fact, the date of which was unknown to the rest of the Game Shakers, Kenzie realizes how much the gang does not know about each other and suggests an "offsite" get-together, with Babe suggesting a camping trip at Yosemite National Park. The Game Shakers were planning on heading there, except that Double G loaned his private jet to Kim Kardashian and Kanye West, so they make their headquarters their offsite. During this time, each reveals a personal secret about themselves, but when Kenzie reveals a fruit flinger she made in third grade and used to hurl a peach, it angers Babe, the one hit by that peach, which went into her eye. Babe isolates herself in Double G's tent until Kenzie gives her the opportunity to get even, having bought some peaches for her to throw. While Babe does throw a peach, she misses Kenzie on purpose and forgives what she did, but when the rest of the gang decides to throw peaches, Kenzie ends up getting struck in the eye, suffering what Babe had gone through, thanks to Ruthless. Guest stars: Shel Bailey as Ruthless, Bubba Ganter as Bunny
42	23	"Spy Games"	David Kendall	Dan Schneider & Jake Farrow	October 21, 2017	217	1.16
After a break-in at Game Shakers, security cameras are installed. The gang learns that only their dishwasher was stolen, and later find out that Double G simply "borrowed" it to remove the smell left by a skunk on his cash while transporting it in the back of his truck. Hudson volunteers to clean the affected money, which amounted to about $400,000. Meanwhile, Babe and Triple G get suspicious over the cameras and discover Kenzie has been spying on the two. After getting caught, Kenzie butt-swears to Babe that she will not spy on her or Triple G again, but Babe devises a plan to tempt Kenzie into breaking her promise. She and Triple G get into a heated, pretend argument, and Kenzie cannot help finding out what happens. The next day, Kenzie sees Babe cleaning up as if a murder was committed; Kenzie goes through security footage to discover Babe snapping and killing Triple G in their enactment. When Kenzie sees Babe is about to do the same to her, she passes out and then realizes Babe was getting back at her for spying. The cameras are removed. As for Double G's money, Hudson gets the smell out, but in doing so, the cash turns into an unrecognizable pile of moist dirt. Guest stars: Shel Bailey as Ruthless, Bubba Ganter as Bunny
43	24	"Babe Gets Crushed"	Steve Hoefer	Dan Schneider & Jake Farrow	November 4, 2017	210	1.38
Triple G talks to Babe about his friend Chuck, who is infatuated with a girl he works with, who happens to also be his boss. Babe likens that to the professional relationship she and Triple G have at Game Shakers, and then thinks he is really in love with her when she gets the impression that this Chuck does not exist. When Triple G sets up a dinner at Fooders for Babe to meet Chuck, and then gets word that Chuck will not be there due to a freak accident, Babe calls Kenzie to come to Fooders to help. Chuck eventually shows up at the restaurant. Meanwhile, Double G has found a stray dog and asks Babe to take care of it. After she gives the dog to Hudson, he ends up naming it "Kenzie", leading to a lot of confusion. Guest stars: Shel Bailey as Ruthless, Bubba Ganter as Bunny, Todd Bosley as Teague, Regi Davis as Mr. Sammich

=== Season 3 (2018–19) ===
No. overall	No. in season	Title	Directed by	Written by	Original release date	Prod. code	U.S. viewers (millions)
44	1	"Babe Loves Danger"	Steve Hoefer	Dan Schneider & Richard Goodman	February 10, 2018	308	1.47
Babe is overjoyed after learning Henry Hart is planning to visit New York for Valentine's Day. At the same time, Double G, upset about losing a venue for a slow jam song he composed to Charlie Puth, agrees to set up his performance at Game Shakers. Later that night, Henry arrives, but he brings a girl named Valerie with him. Heartbroken, Babe leaves and orders a self-driving car that eventually spirals out of control. After learning of Babe's situation, Henry comes to her rescue as Kid Danger, disabling the car in the process. Henry clears the misunderstanding by assuring Babe that he and Valerie are friends, spending the night stuck in the car. Special guest star: Jace Norman as Henry Guest star: Michael D. Cohen as Schwoz
45	2	"Lumples"	Adam Weissman	Dan Schneider & Jake Farrow	February 18, 2018	301	0.80
Kenzie puts Hudson in an "anti-germ habitat", saying that it's to stop his nasty cough from killing them. After tricking Bunny, Double G wants to help Hudson with his cough instead of going to a meeting with the Game Shakers at the company PlayMo Toys. At the PlayMo company, The CEO, Claire, asks the Game Shakers if they are interested in making a game about their soon-to-be-released toy called "The Lumple", but forbids them from even seeing it. Double G makes Hudson drink his gold brew which has actual gold in it, but Hudson begins consistently drinking the brew, causing his skin to turn gold. After being tipped by Claire's secretary Daryl, The Game Shakers go to Claire's house to steal her daughter's Lumple. Despite being beaten out of the house by Claire's karate-kicking daughter, Sophie, The Game Shakers successfully procure the Lumple, allowing them to finish the game. Meanwhile, after Hudson's addiction to the gold brew gets out of hand, Double G, Bunny and Ruthless make him sweat out all the gold he drank. Guest stars: Shel Bailey as Ruthless, Bubba Ganter as Bunny, Tom Lommel as Daryl, Lauren Plaxco as Claire Begonia, Amol Shah as Lloyd, Channah Zeitung as Sophie
46	3	"Subway Girl"	David Kendall	Dan Schneider & Richard Goodman	February 25, 2018	302	0.83
Babe becomes famous as "Subway Girl" after a video of her dancing to Double G's new single goes viral. Some comments of the video are implying that she is a better dancer than Double G. This makes Double G angry, so he challenges Babe to a dance battle. Meanwhile, Hudson is moonlighting as "toddler walker", an endeavor that ends up to be much more challenging than he thought. Triple G is struggling about his home school prom; initially he doesn't want to go, but then he meets a cute girl, Aleesha, who is actually going to the home school prom. Triple G asks her if she wants to go to the prom with him, but Aleesha says that Triple G is not her type. Triple G ends up going to the prom with Babe, to make Aleesha jealous, but she still doesn't seems interested in Triple G - even though her boyfriend Trey, is basically a clone of Triple G. Later Double G pops up at the prom, still looking to settle the score with Babe. At the end, Triple G leaves the prom with a new friend, and the dance battle takes up a little more time than planned. Guest stars: Shel Bailey as Ruthless, Bubba Ganter as Bunny, Todd Bosley as Teague, Theodore Barnes as Trey, Laya Deleon Hayes as Aleesha
47	4	"Snackpot!"	Adam Weissman	Dan Schneider & Sean Gill & Jana Petrosini	March 4, 2018	303	0.84
Hudson buys a vending machine called Snackpot!, initially set up at Game Shakers and later moved to the subway station. The vending machine, which had a limited run in 2007, picks a snack for the consumer at random. Later, Hudson is attacked while at his Snackpot!, coming back to Game Shakers with one of his shoes missing. As Babe, Kenzie and Hudson return to the subway station, Babe encounters a group of bad girls known as The Fangs, which she used to be a member of. The girls eventually return Hudson's shoe and come to Game Shakers after Babe invites them. Kenzie is left alone with The Fangs when Babe goes to buy some frozen yogurt; the girls lock Kenzie in a bag, taking her clothes and everything at Game Shakers. Meanwhile, Triple G, Double G, Ruthless and Bunny go to Coney Island. Aside from that trip, Double G sees a rare Jon-Jerale in the Snackpot! and wants it. He keeps feeding quarters into the machine with no luck, but when he briefly leaves to be in selfies with some women, a boy in a wheelchair tries the Snackpot! and receives that Jon-Jerale. Double G gets into an argument with the boy and his mother. Guest stars: Shel Bailey as Ruthless, Bubba Ganter as Bunny, Kylee Brown as Tosh, Remi Deupree as Crystal
48	5	"Babe & the Boys"	Steve Hoefer	Dan Schneider & Jake Farrow	March 11, 2018	304	0.84
Babe is upset when she finds out that Mason Kendall is dating another girl. Kenzie designs a dating app to get her a date with another boy in order to help her move on from Mason. But the app glitches and as a result, Babe ends up having dates with tons of boys. Meanwhile, Triple G and Hudson have to create a song for a Skeez-its commercial. Guest stars: Shel Bailey as Ruthless, Bubba Ganter as Bunny, Joshua Bassett as Brock, Josh Levi as Rick, Kurt Tocci as Squats
49	6	"Escape from Utah!"	Nathan Kress	Dan Schneider & Sean Gill & Jana Petrosini	April 1, 2018	306	0.52
After accidentally letting Double G's pet tiger escape, Triple G is unwillingly sent away by his dad to Captive Meadows, an all-male boarding facility in Utah, leaving Babe and Kenzie worried. Needing Ruthless to come with them to Utah as he is an adult, the girls devise a plan to break Triple G out of Captive Meadows by disguising Babe as a misbehaving boy, but as she is sent into the facility, she discovers that the place is a living paradise. Double G and Bunny later arrive in Utah, but when Double G, who is in the middle of a music video shoot, is denied the opportunity to see Triple G, he has Bunny smash through the wall and unsympathetically takes his son home, in spite of Triple G verbally expressing how much he was enjoying himself, while everyone—save for an equally confused Babe—applauds. Guest stars: Shel Bailey as Ruthless, Bubba Ganter as Bunny, Jennifer Marshall as Marlene, Tom Plumley as Thatcher
50	7	"Super Ugly Head"	Mike Caron	Dan Schneider & Richard Goodman	April 8, 2018	305	0.76
A statue with Double G's face molded on is built and displayed in the New York Subway. Unfortunately, the statue is ugly. As a result, Double G destroys the statue. Knowing that he has broken the law, Kenzie is determined to turn Double G in to the police. But when Double G begs her not to tell on him, Kenzie then tries to hide what Double G did but gets arrested for this. Guest stars: Shel Bailey as Ruthless, Bubba Ganter as Bunny
51	8	"Snoop Therapy"	Harry Matheu	Dan Schneider & Jake Farrow	March 30, 2019	310	0.73
The Game Shakers are not getting along at work. When they see Double G's changed demeanor following another mistake by Bunny, they inquire about the therapist Double G has been seeing, along with Bunny and Ruthless, and find out it is rapper Snoop Dogg. At the appointment, Snoop has Babe, Kenzie, Triple G and Hudson work together to escape his office. One of the clues involves using Snoop's lizard, which gets taken out of its cage and ends up attacking Kenzie. She vanishes shortly afterward, but still helps the other three escape as they continue to hear her voice. Snoop allows the gang to keep the lizard as reward for completing the therapy exercise. Meanwhile, at The Beach, Double G and Ruthless celebrate Bunny's birthday. Both Double G and Bunny order pork chops, but only one is available. Double G allows Bunny to have the one pork chop, but moments later, he loses his temper seeing that Bunny is enjoying it. Special guest star: Snoop Dogg as himself Guest stars: Shel Bailey as Ruthless, Bubba Ganter as Bunny
52	9	"Hot Bananas"	Russ Reinsel	Dan Schneider & Jake Farrow	April 6, 2019	307	0.74
Triple G gets upset when a young gamer named Greg McConnor trash talks about him on social media, and it leads Triple G to challenge him to a game at The Hole. Triple G loses to Greg and becomes depressed. A rematch between the two eventually takes place, with Triple G apparently performing poorly again. During both contests, Greg's father is holding a device that every now and then resets Triple G's score in the game. Kenzie catches on to what is happening and confirms Greg's father is using a bluetooth blocker to affect Triple G's controls. With Double G eating hot bananas to help heal his cramping, as a result of preparing for his next music video, Babe gets an idea to stop the cheating, giving Greg's father a heated banana and asking him to peel it. Once that happens, Triple G goes on to win the rematch with Greg. Guest stars: Shel Bailey as Ruthless, Bubba Ganter as Bunny, Jack Fisher as Greg McConnor, Josh Server as Mr. McConnor, Samuel Wyatt as Pyke
53	10	"Flavor City"	Steve Hoefer	Dan Schneider & Sean Gill & Jana Petrosini	April 13, 2019	309	0.89
The Game Shakers are invited to see a musical called Flavor City, but when Double G presents the tickets to them, there are only six—for seven people. With no chance of obtaining a seventh ticket, since the show is sold out, an argument ensues about who will go. Hudson is left out but still manages to sneak in with Ruthless's help. Prior to the show, Kenzie needs a bathroom break, but winds up in an alley outside the theater and cannot get back inside. The Game Shakers take up the second row in the theater and have to deal with a women's hockey team sitting right in front of them, causing Double G to argue with the theater manager. More disruption happens, including Babe moving into the front row with the hockey players for an opportunity to pull the train whistle at the start of the musical, and Triple G continuing to play a game about U.S. Presidents on his phone. It leads to the whole gang being thrown out of the theater and banned from seeing the musical. Guest stars: Shel Bailey as Ruthless, Bubba Ganter as Bunny, Katherine Von Till as Mrs. Karnidge
54	11	"Wet Willy's Wild Water Park"	Steve Hoefer	Dan Schneider & Richard Goodman	April 20, 2019	311	0.85
Double G gets Babe, Kenzie and Hudson out of school for a trip to Wet Willy's Wild Water Park, on its final day before closing forever. The gang hopes to set a new speed record on a slide known as the Big Ripper. After Double G, Hudson and Triple G take their turns, Kenzie is next, but she is afraid and Babe needs to give her a pep talk. Once Kenzie has taken her turn, Babe is ready to head down the Big Ripper but becomes anxious like Kenzie. With time running out before the park's close, Babe continues to hold out, and even Kenzie cannot get her to go—Babe sends Kenzie down the slide again instead. Closing time hits, and Babe coerces the slide operator into giving her another chance. With no water running through the Big Ripper, she pours a tub of melted butter, which Hudson bought and intended to use for his next trip on the slide, all over herself. She goes down the slide... and sets the speed record. Guest stars: Nicole J. Butler as Melba, Regi Davis as Mr. Sammich, Troy Doherty as Carl, Eric Satterberg as Rodney
55	12	"Demolition Dollhouse"	Adam Weissman	Dan Schneider & Sean Gill & Jana Petrosini	April 27, 2019	312	0.64
Triple G and Hudson unveil a new game they want Babe and Kenzie to consider, which involves decorating a dollhouse and then blowing it up. The boys spend a great deal of time decorating the dollhouse, with some additional assistance from Double G and his personal therapist and interior designer, Snoop Dogg. After Bobby Dong sets up the explosives for the dollhouse, Triple G, Hudson and Double G are each hesitant to destroy it and back out because of how much they admire their hard work on it. Meanwhile, Kenzie meets a cute guy at the subway station but is already inside a departing train before she can get any information about him. Babe later tries to track him down and ends up temporarily being the lead singer in a subway band, passing up an opportunity to be on the Tonight Show with Jimmy Fallon when she finally sees the guy, whose name is Jeremy. Babe brings Jeremy over to Game Shakers so he can meet Kenzie, at the same time the dollhouse explodes, after Hudson carelessly holds a Jon-Jerale bottle right above the detonation button. Special guest star: Snoop Dogg as himself Guest stars: Alexandre Chen as Bobby Dong, Aaron Guest as Jeremy
56	13	"Hungry Hungry Hypno"	Adam Weissman	Dan Schneider & Jake Farrow	May 4, 2019	313	0.72
The Game Shakers see a show by Dr. Cortex for Kenzie's birthday. She is invited on stage by Dr. Cortex, who presents her with a lit cupcake, though she cannot eat another bite. After the candle on her cupcake is extinguished, Kenzie is hypnotized into being massively hungry and devours not just the cupcake but another guest's meal. The only way to break Kenzie's hunger is for Hudson to kiss her, but he is dating a girl named Cassie and will not risk his relationship with her. Because Hudson refuses to kiss Kenzie, she continues on a rampage to eat more, and it interferes with Double G's performing a birthday song for her. Babe and Triple G hope another boy named Hudson will break Kenzie's hunger spell, simply because his name is Hudson, but it does not work. Later at Game Shakers, when the Hudson who needs to break the spell is holding a bottle of olives and eating the last one, Kenzie rushes to him to get the olive out of his mouth. It breaks the hypnosis, but it also causes Cassie to break up with Hudson, as she witnesses his kissing Kenzie. Guest stars: Shel Bailey as Ruthless, Bubba Ganter as Bunny, Kurt Long as Dr. Cortex
57	14	"Breaking Bad News"	Steve Hoefer	Dan Schneider & Richard Goodman	May 11, 2019	314	0.68
When Double G's huge, one-of-a-kind, two-million-dollar television called the Epiphany gets delivered to Game Shakers, he gives Babe, Kenzie, Triple G and Hudson strict instructions not to touch it. While Babe works on removing the top part from her toothbrush, that part goes flying and hits the television screen, causing it to eventually break. Both Babe and Triple G panic over how Double G will react to this, but Triple G decides to take the blame and tell his dad. Before Triple G can say anything about the Epiphany, he receives a belated Christmas gift from his dad, an all-terrain vehicle known as the Mud Rucker. Realizing this present has Triple G distracted, Babe is faced with telling Double G herself. She goes to his recording studio, while he is finalizing a deal to perform during halftime of the biggest football game of the year, and confesses to breaking the Epiphany. Double G does not take it well, trashing the studio in a yelling fit of rage. Guest stars: Shel Bailey as Ruthless, Jonathan Bray as Paul Puntz
58	15	"Bug Tussle"	David Kendall	Dan Schneider & Sean Gill & Jana Petrosini	May 25, 2019	315	0.65
After Double G, Bunny and Ruthless head on a trip to Las Vegas, but unknowingly leave Triple G behind, the Game Shakers decide to have a sleepover at one of Double G's unused apartments in SoHo in an attempt to cheer him up. Triple G finds a board game in the apartment called Bug Tussle, which he played with his dad when he was young and is eager to play with his friends, but Babe starts flirting with a musician, Blake from the band Force Five, while Hudson picks up girls with his keyboard skills, and Kenzie is occupied with her stubborn bush weasel, leaving Triple G lonely. He resigns to the apartment's balcony, in the freezing cold and snow. In Las Vegas, Double G realizes he forgot Triple G, and returns to New York to pick him up, at the same time Babe and Kenzie notice Triple G on the balcony and pry open the frozen door, only to find him missing afterward. Guest stars: Shel Bailey as Ruthless, Bubba Ganter as Bunny, Matt Cornett as Blake, Ricky Garcia as Wokeen, Sloane Morgan Siegel as Glenn
59	16	"Why Tonya?"	Mike Caron	Dan Schneider & Jake Farrow	May 25, 2019	318	0.58
Tonya Mulligan, a professional gamer, is dissatisfied with an endless-runner game called Run Pucker Run made by Game Shakers and complains to them about it, wanting the game to end. Kenzie alters the game so that it has an ending, but when she and Babe are confronted again by Tonya while having lunch, Tonya wants the game to be endless again. Babe makes it clear to Tonya that Game Shakers will make no more changes to the game for her. Later, when Kenzie heads to the company restroom, Tonya pops up inside and locks Kenzie in with her by breaking the door handle. Babe hears Kenzie's screams for help and calls the police, while Triple G and Hudson have a different idea, having come across S.P.U.T. gear that Double G, Ruthless and Bunny showed them. Against Babe's objections, the boys head to the restroom and use the S.P.U.T. air blaster to force the door open. Tonya is pinned to the wall by the displaced door. Guest stars: Shel Bailey as Ruthless, Bubba Ganter as Bunny, Julia Lester as Tonya
60	17	"Boy Band Cat Nose"	Peter Filsinger	Dan Schneider & Jake Farrow	June 1, 2019	316	0.70
Kenzie's cat Valentine suffers from unusually narrow nasal passages, leading to some breathing difficulty. Double G sets up an appointment with veterinarian Dr. Smoontz to correct the problem. During the appointment, Babe becomes offended by Dr. Smoontz's staring at her and leaves his office. Meanwhile, Triple G reports that one of the members of the band Force Five was injured in Tampa, leading the band to suspend their tour and find a replacement. Triple G thinks Hudson is a suitable replacement and sets up an audition at Double G's SoHo apartment, but when they find out Force Five has already filled the spot, Hudson gets the idea of intentionally injuring another member in the band. A few days later, when Triple G discovers Hudson is back at the apartment, he goes to stop him from carrying out his plot. Dr. Smoontz reports that Valentine's surgery was successful, but Kenzie is shocked to see that, while the nasal problem has been corrected, her cat is now green. Similar to the original appointment with Dr. Smoontz, Babe leaves his office after he stares at her again. Guest stars: Matt Cornett as Blake, Ricky Garcia as Wokeen, Sloane Morgan Siegel as Glenn, Gregg Martin as Blesh, Jack Plotnick as Dr. Smoontz
61	18	"He's Back"	Steve Hoefer	Dan Schneider & Danny Warren & Alejandro Bien-Willner	June 8, 2019	317	0.56
Blake asks Babe out to his family reunion, making Babe excited. Meanwhile Mason Kendall returns from Florida to see her, and Babe becomes overwhelmed and faints in front of Mason. Babe dreams of having a date with Mason and Blake, and doesn't know who to choose, because she both likes them. Kenzie convinces her to go with Blake and forget about Mason. Double G, Ruthless and Bunny leave New York to capture a leprechaun with the "lepre-catcher" and Double G orders Triple G and Hudson to buy him Paul Newman's watch. Triple G and Hudson buy a watch from the wrong Paul Newman for $20 million, and when Double G comes back and learns that Triple G and Hudson bought the wrong watch, he chases them out the office. While preparing to go with Blake to his family reunion, Babe is surprised by Henry, who has come to New York to see her, leaving Babe shocked and uncertain. Special guest stars: Jace Norman as Henry, Snoop Dogg as himself Guest stars: Shel Bailey as Ruthless, Bubba Ganter as Bunny, Tanner Buchanan as Mason Kendall, Matt Cornett as Blake, Ricky Garcia as Wokeen
