= Schneider's Bakery =

American television production company

Schneider's Bakery, Inc.
- Type: Private
- Industry: Television production
- Genre: Teen sitcom
- Founded: June 6, 1996; 30 years ago
- Founder: Dan Schneider
- Headquarters: Los Angeles, California, U.S.
- Area served: International
- Products: Television series Television films
- Owner: Dan Schneider
- Website: danschneider.com

Schneider's Bakery, Inc. is an American television production company founded on June 6, 1996 by Dan Schneider. The company's name originates from Schneider's father's business located in Memphis, Tennessee.

Television shows produced under the Schneider's Bakery banner are noted for using the same stable of writers on all series, something that is atypical for scripted television series and especially sitcoms that are created by the same writer; staff writers working for most of Schneider's series include Andrew Hill Newman, George Doty IV and Jake Farrow, among others.

Directors Steve Hoefer and Russ Reinsel also work for the company directing many episodes under the company banner. Musicians Backhouse Mike and C.J. Abraham are largely responsible for the music on the shows. Background music selected by the crew of Schneider's Bakery includes such musicians as The Orion Experience, Jennifer McNutt, and AM.

== History ==
Founded on June 6, 1996, in Tennessee. It was approved to operate in California on August 27, 1999. On January 16, 2001, Schneider's Bakery was considered delinquent by the Secretary of State of California for failing to file their Statements of Information, and by November 3, 2003, the company was considered forfeited by the State. In order to operate again, California's Secretary of State's Revivor Unit had to be contacted, and Schneider's Bakery was approved to be revived on February 17, 2004.

In the summer of 2004, when production started on Zoey 101 and filming began at Pepperdine University, the Lovernich apartments on campus were used as makeshift offices for Schneider's Bakery.

== Productions ==
=== TV ===
==== Live-action ====
Show	Creator(s)	Years Aired	# of seasons	# of episodes produced	Status
All That (Note: Only the "R U All That?" special and the tenth season were produced by Schneider's Bakery.)	Mike Tollin; Brian Robbins	1994–2005	10	175	Ended
Drake & Josh (Note: First series produced by the company.)	Dan Schneider	2004–2007	4	56	Ended
Zoey 101	Dan Schneider	2005–2008	4	61	Ended
iCarly	Dan Schneider	2007–2012	5	97	Ended
Victorious	Dan Schneider	2010–2013	4	57	Ended
Sam & Cat	Dan Schneider	2013–2014	1	35	Ended
Henry Danger (Note: Only the first four seasons were produced by Schneider's Bakery.)	Dan Schneider; Dana Olsen	2014–2020	5	121	Ended
Game Shakers	Dan Schneider	2015–2019	3	61	Ended

==== Animation ====
Show	Creator(s)	Years Aired	# of seasons	# of episodes produced	Status
The Adventures of Kid Danger (Note: First and only animated series produced by the company.) (Note: Most recent series produced by the company as of 2026.)	Dan Schneider	2018	1	12	Ended
