= It Came from Hollywood =

1982 film directed by Malcolm Leo and Andrew Solt

- Theatrical release poster.
- Directed by: Malcolm Leo; Andrew Solt
- Written by: Dana Olsen
- Produced by: Jeff Stein; Susan Strausberg
- Starring: Dan Aykroyd; John Candy; Cheech Marin; Tommy Chong; Gilda Radner
- Cinematography: Fred J. Koenekamp
- Edited by: Janice Hampton; Sarah Legon; Bert Lovitt
- Distributed by: Paramount Pictures
- Release date: October 29, 1982
- Running time: 80 minutes
- Country: United States
- Language: English
- Budget: $5 million
- Box office: $2.6 million

It Came from Hollywood is a 1982 American comedy documentary film compiling clips from various B movies. Written by Dana Olsen and directed by Malcolm Leo and Andrew Solt, the film features wraparound segments and narration by several famous comedians, including Dan Aykroyd, John Candy, Gilda Radner, and Cheech and Chong. Sections of It Came from Hollywood focus on gorilla pictures, anti-marijuana films and the works of Ed Wood.

== Cast ==
- Dan Aykroyd as himself/col. Dan Diamond (segment Aliens)/The High School Patrol (segment Troubled Teenagers)/the Scientist (segment The Brains)
- John Candy as himself/the producer/the projectionist
- Cheech and Chong as themselves
- Gilda Radner as herself/Judy Miller the young girl

The character of the col. Dan Diamond is a reference to the Motor Sergeant Frank Tree from the film 1941, also starring Aykroyd, while the character of the young girl by Gilda is a reference to the most know Judy Miller character of her SNL sketches.

Dan Aykroyd in this film presents a segment called "Troubled Teens" playing a detective dressed in a trench-coat, with the voice-over intro to this states in true 'Dragnet' style: "From the Official Files of the Californian Department of Education". About five years later Aykroyd starred in the official movie parody of the series.

== Segments ==
- "Gorillas" (Gilda Radner)
- "Aliens" (Dan Aykroyd)
- "Giants and Tiny People" (Cheech and Chong)
- "A Salute to Edward D. Wood, Jr." (John Candy)
- "Musical Memories" (Gilda Radner)
- "Previews of Coming Attractions" (trailers) (John Candy)
- "Troubled Teenagers" (Dan Aykroyd)
- "Getting High in the Movies" (Cheech and Chong)
- "The Animal Kingdom Goes Berserk" (Cheech and Chong)
- "Technical Triumphs" (John Candy)
- "The Brain" (Dan Aykroyd)
- "Monsters" (Gilda Radner)

== List of films ==
- Sunny Side Up (1929)
- Maniac (1934)
- Wonder Bar (1934)
- The Lost City (1935)
- Reefer Madness (1936)
- Marihuana (1936)
- Perils of Nyoka (1942)
- Isle of Forgotten Sins (1943)
- Musical Movieland (1944)
- The Monster and the Ape (1945)
- The White Gorilla (1945)
- Blonde Savage (1947)
- Street Corner (1948)
- Daughter of the Jungle (1949)
- The Flying Saucer (1950)
- The Day the Earth Stood Still (1951)
- Zombies of the Stratosphere (1952)
- Glen or Glenda (1953)
- Robot Monster (1953)
- The Beast from 20,000 Fathoms (1953)
- The War of the Worlds (1953)
- Creature from the Black Lagoon (1954)
- Bride of the Monster (1955)
- The Violent Years (1956)
- Earth vs. the Flying Saucers (1956)
- Fire Maidens from Outer Space (1956)
- Runaway Daughters (1956)
- Shake, Rattle & Rock! (1956)
- Don't Knock the Rock (1956)
- Rock Baby: Rock It (1957)
- The Brain from Planet Arous (1957)
- The Incredible Shrinking Man (1957)
- Dragstrip Girl (1957)
- The Deadly Mantis (1957)
- The Giant Claw (1957)
- Beginning of the End (1957)
- The Cyclops (1957)
- From Hell It Came (1957)
- The Amazing Colossal Man (1957)
- I Was a Teenage Frankenstein (1957)
- Plan 9 from Outer Space (1957)
- Teenage Monster (1958)
- The Bride and the Beast (1958)
- The Cool and the Crazy (1958)
- Attack of the Puppet People (1958)
- Attack of the 50 Foot Woman (1958)
- High School Confidential! (1958)
- High School Hellcats (1958)
- The Space Children (1958)
- Fiend Without a Face (1958)
- The Fly (1958)
- Curse of the Faceless Man (1958)
- The Party Crashers (1958)
- The Blob (1958)
- I Married a Monster from Outer Space (1958)
- Frankenstein's Daughter (1958)
- Monster from Green Hell (1958)
- The Trollenberg Terror (1958)
- Missile to the Moon (1958)
- The Hideous Sun Demon (1959)
- Battle in Outer Space (1959)
- House on Haunted Hill (1959)
- Prince of Space (1959)
- Teenagers from Outer Space (1959)
- The Killer Shrews (1959)
- The Tingler (1959)
- First Man Into Space (1959)
- The Loves of Hercules (1960)
- The Hypnotic Eye (1960)
- Invasion of the Neptune Men (1961)
- Reptilicus (1961)
- Rocket Attack U.S.A. (1961)
- Married Too Young (1962)
- The Brain That Wouldn't Die (1962)
- Matango (1963)
- Slime People (1963)
- Evil Brain from Outer Space (1964)
- The Creeping Terror (1964)
- Atomic Rulers (1964)
- The Incredibly Strange Creatures Who Stopped Living and Became Mixed-Up Zombies (1964)
- The Horror of Party Beach (1964)
- Frankenstein Meets the Spacemonster (1965)
- Bat Men of Africa (1966)
- Mars Needs Women (1967)
- The Weird World of LSD (1967)
- The X from Outer Space (1967)
- Yongary, Monster from the Deep (1967)
- Son of Godzilla (1967)
- Octaman (1971)
- The Thing with Two Heads (1972)
- Black Belt Jones (1974)
- Frankenstein and the Monster from Hell (1974)
- A*P*E (1976)
- The Incredible Melting Man (1977)
- Attack of the Killer Tomatoes (1978)

== See also ==
- Mystery Science Theater 3000
- List of films considered the worst
- The Golden Turkey Awards
