= Game Shakers =

American comedy television series

- Genre: Comedy
- Created by: Dan Schneider
- Starring: Cree Cicchino; Madisyn Shipman; Benjamin "Lil' P-Nut" Flores, Jr.; Thomas Kuc; Kel Mitchell
- Theme music composer: Michael Corcoran; Zack Hexum; Dan Schneider; Jake Farrow
- Opening theme: "Drop Dat What" by Kel Mitchell
- Composers: Michael Corcoran; Zack Hexum
- Country of origin: United States
- Original language: English
- No. of seasons: 3
- No. of episodes: 61 (list of episodes)

Production
- Executive producer: Dan Schneider
- Producers: Jeffrey Goldstein; Bruce Rand Berman
- Camera setup: Multi-camera
- Running time: 22–23 minutes
- Production companies: Schneider's Bakery; Nickelodeon Productions

Original release
- Network: Nickelodeon
- Release: September 12, 2015 – June 8, 2019

Game Shakers is an American comedy television series created by Dan Schneider that premiered on Nickelodeon on September 12, 2015. The series ran for three seasons, with its final episode airing on June 8, 2019. It stars Cree Cicchino, Madisyn Shipman, Benjamin "Lil' P-Nut" Flores, Jr., Thomas Kuc, and Kel Mitchell.

== Premise ==
The series revolves around two seventh graders, Babe and Kenzie, living in Brooklyn, New York, who create a video game app called "Sky Whale" for their school science project. When the game proves to be wildly successful, they form a gaming company called Game Shakers, and hire their friend, Hudson. They later partner with rapper Double G, who becomes their investor as part of a compromise for their illegal use of his song, "Drop Dat What", in their game. Double G's son, Triple G, then becomes a video game consultant for the company, making him the fourth Game Shaker.

== Episodes ==
Season	Episodes	Originally released	
Season	Episodes	First released	Last released
1	19	September 12, 2015	May 21, 2016
2	24	September 17, 2016	November 4, 2017
3	18	February 10, 2018	June 8, 2019

== Cast and characters ==
=== Main ===
- Cree Cicchino as Babe Carano, creator of Game Shakers at 12 years old. She always does her own thing and doesn't mind stepping on someone's toes to do so. She is confident, quick-witted, and fearless when it comes to making tough decisions. In "MeGo the Freakish Robot", it is revealed that Babe is allergic to peanuts.
- Madisyn Shipman as Kenzie Bell, creator of Game Shakers at 12 years old. She lacks a social filter and tends to be extremely blunt, but makes up for her lackluster social skills with incredible tech knowledge.
- Benjamin "Lil' P-Nut" Flores, Jr. as Triple G, the son of Double G who had a lavish childhood, but all that he really wants is to be with children his own age. He's eventually hired by Babe and Kenzie as the video game consultant. In "Shark Explosion", it is revealed that his first name is Grover.
- Thomas Kuc as Hudson, a friend of Babe and Kenzie as well as a member of Game Shakers. Despite knowing that Hudson isn't necessarily intelligent, Babe states in "Sky Whale" that he's cute and will do whatever she and Kenzie say.
- Kel Mitchell as Double G, a successful rapper and billionaire whose real name is Gale J. Griffin. He is impulsive, unpredictable, and determined to have as much fun and money as possible. With the help of Babe and Kenzie, he rediscovers his love for gaming, and becomes the main investor of Game Shakers. In "Revenge at Tech Fest", Double G gets a temporary trionic right arm after his right arm is badly broken following a slingshot incident caused by MeGo. In "The Switch", it is revealed that Double G is allergic to shrimp.

=== Recurring ===
- Shel Bailey as Ruthless, Double G's tall assistant who speaks extremely loudly
- Bubba Ganter as Bunny, Double G's childish assistant
- Regi Davis as Mr. Sammich, Babe, Kenzie, and Hudson's science teacher at Sugar Hill Junior High School. While he is often annoyed when Double G crashes his classes to scold Babe and Kenzie on something they did wrong, Mr. Sammich tends to cower when Ruthless and Bunny are with him.
- Tanner Buchanan as Mason Kendall, an older boy whom Babe has a crush on. In "The Mason Experience", Mason moves away to Florida.
- Todd Bosley as Teague, a waiter at Fooders

== Production ==
When ordered to series in early 2015, it was planned that the first season would consist of 26 episodes. The cast of the series was announced on July 7, 2015. On July 25, 2015, the network announced some special guest stars, including Matt Bennett, Yvette Nicole Brown, GloZell, Jared "ProJared" Knabenbauer, and Smosh Games host David "Lasercorn" Moss. On March 2, 2016, Nickelodeon announced that the series had been renewed for a second season. The second season premiered on Nickelodeon on September 17, 2016. Nickelodeon renewed Game Shakers for a third season on November 16, 2016. The third season premiered on Nickelodeon on February 10, 2018. On March 26, 2018, Nickelodeon announced that Game Shakers had been canceled and would end after its third season.

== Broadcast ==
The series premiered on YTV in Canada on October 6, 2015, and debuted on Nickelodeon channels in the United Kingdom and Ireland on November 2, 2015, and in Australia and New Zealand on February 8, 2016.

== Reception ==
=== Ratings ===
Viewership and ratings per season of Game Shakers
Season	Episodes	First aired		Last aired		Avg. viewers (millions)
Season	Episodes	Date	Viewers (millions)	Date	Viewers (millions)	Avg. viewers (millions)
1	19	September 12, 2015	1.98	May 21, 2016	1.73	1.64
2	24	September 17, 2016	1.56	November 4, 2017	1.38	1.43
3	18	February 10, 2018	1.47	June 8, 2019	0.56	0.77

=== Nominations ===
Year	Award	Category	Result	Ref.
2016	Kids' Choice Awards Mexico	Favorite International Program	Nominated	
2017	Nickelodeon Kids' Choice Awards	Favorite TV Show – Kids' Show	Nominated	
2017	Kids' Choice Awards Mexico	Favorite International Program	Nominated	
2017	Kids' Choice Awards Colombia	Favorite International Program	Nominated	

== Video games ==
Over the course of the series, a number of games designed by the characters have been shown on Game Shakers. These games have been released online and through the Nick app. Several of the games share titles with episodes of the series (e.g. "Sky Whale", "Dirty Blob", "Tiny Pickles", "Nasty Goats", and "Llama Llama Spit Spit"). The following is the list of games that have been released:

- Sky Whale
- Dirty Blob
- Tiny Pickles
- Punchy Face
- Pop Star Surgeon
- Scubaroo
- Nasty Goats
- Pick It, Scratch It, Pop It
- Octopie
- Psycho Beach Mummies
- Ballarina
- Llama Llama Spit Spit
- Crime Warp
