= Madisyn Shipman =

American actress, singer and model

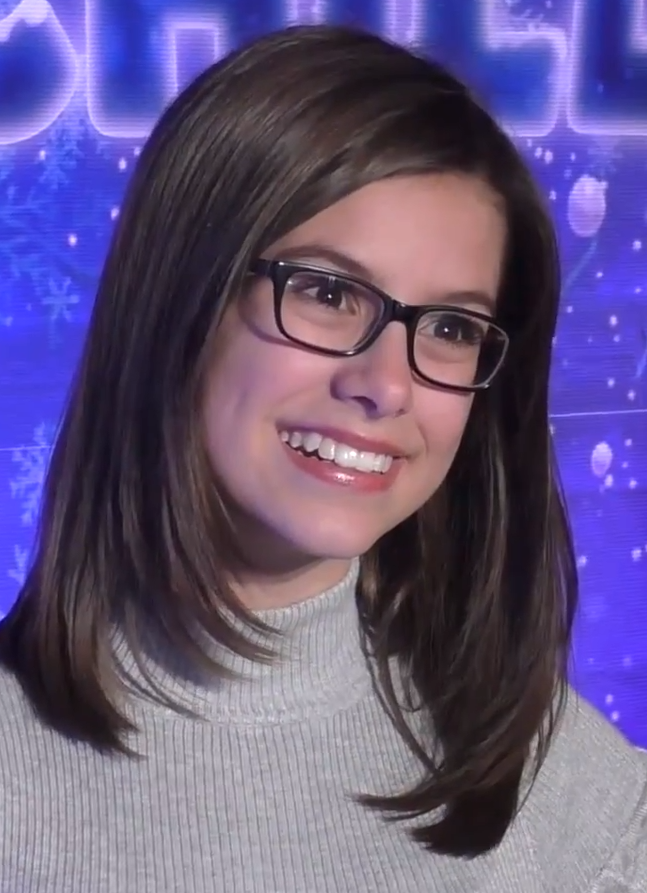
- Shipman in 2016
- Born: November 20, 2002 (age 23); Kings Mountain, North Carolina, U.S.
- Occupations: Actress, singer, model
- Years active: 2009–present

Madisyn Shipman (born November 20, 2002) is an American actress, singer and model. She is known for playing Kenzie Bell in the Nickelodeon sitcom Game Shakers.

== Early life ==
Shipman was born in Kings Mountain, North Carolina. She is the eldest of four children, and her parents are Jen and Tracey Shipman. Shipman began writing songs and playing guitar when she was eight.

== Career ==
When Shipman was five, she began working with a talent agency that helped her land three different roles on Saturday Night Live, as well as roles on Sesame Street and on stage. She appeared in the play Enron on Broadway in 2010.

In 2015, she was cast in the lead role as Kenzie Bell, a girl who is one of the co-founders of the titular game company, in the Nickelodeon television series Game Shakers which is produced by Dan Schneider.

She started her music career in 2021 and has since released nine singles.

In 2023, Shipman joined the Playboy Creator Platform.

== Filmography ==
Television and film roles
Year	Title	Role	Notes
2009–2011	Saturday Night Live	Various	3 episodes
2010	Sesame Street	Madisyn	1 episode
2012	Modern Love	Maddie	Television movie
2015–2019	Game Shakers	Kenzie	Main role
2015–2017	Whisker Haven	Blossom	Voice role; 6 episodes
2015	The Peanuts Movie	Violet	Film; voice role
2016	Ordinary World	Salome	Film
2017	Henry Danger	Kenzie	Crossover special: "Danger Games"
2019, 2021	Red Ruby	Flora	Web series; main role
2022	Call Me Kat	Pippa	Episode: "Call Me a Kingbirdie"

== Discography ==
=== Singles ===
==== As lead artist ====
Title	Year	Album	Written by	Produced by
"Married"	2023	Metanoia	Michael Blum, Sam DeRosa	Blum
"Baseball Games" (featuring Brooklyn Queen)	2023	Metanoia	Madisyn Shipman, Myah Marie, Zak Waters	Pretty Sister
"Jill"	2023	Metanoia	JT Roach, Shipman, Marie	-
"Dgaf"	2023	Metanoia	Albert Harvey, Andreas Moss, Shipman, Marie	Glowinthedark
"I Like Your Dad"	2023	Metanoia	Edward McGuire Cameron, Roach, Shipman, Blum, Marie	Roach, Ned Cameron
"Bitch Boy"	2023	Metanoia	Shipman, Blum, Marie	-
"Nobody"	2022	Metanoia	Shipman, Blum, Marie	Blum
"Nice Guys"	2022	Metanoia	Shipman, Marie	Blum
"Flying Solo"	2021	Metanoia	Abraham Benjamin Stewart, Jordyn Dodd-Waddington, Shipman	Stewart
