= Hot Resort =

- Directed by: John Robins
- Screenplay by: John Robins; Boaz Davidson; Norman Hudis
- Story by: Paul Max Rubenstein
- Produced by: Yoram Globus; Menahem Golan
- Starring: Tom Parsekian; Michael Berz; Bronson Pinchot; Dan Schneider; Marcy Walker; Debra Kelly; Samm-Art Williams; Frank Gorshin
- Cinematography: Frank P. Flynn
- Edited by: Dory Lubliner; Brent Schoenfeld
- Production companies: The Cannon Group, Inc. Golan-Globus
- Distributed by: Cannon Group; Pan-Canadian Film Distributors
- Release date: January 1985
- Running time: 92 minutes
- Countries: United States; St Kitts and Nevis
- Language: English

Hot Resort is a 1985 comedy film directed by John Robins and starring Bronson Pinchot, Dan Schneider, Marcy Walker and Samm-Art Williams. It was shot on Saint Kitts with an American cast and crew.

== Plot ==
Several young American men go to St. Kitts for a summer job at a resort hotel, hoping to earn money for college and meet women. They clash with a group of wealthy Ivy League rowers there to film a soup commercial.

== Production ==
Hot Resort was filmed on an Arriflex 35BL camera and 35 mm film, on location at the Royal Saint Kitts Hotel, Saint Kitts.

== Reception ==
The Blockbuster Video Guide to Movies and Videos described it as a "cold sophomoric comedy." Leonard Maltin rated Hot Resort a "bomb" and gave it a "D".

In the Radio Times, Keith Bailey gave it one star, saying "There's not much in the way of humour in this teen comedy […] Poor old Frank Gorshin wanders in and out of the virtually plotless story, while Bronson Pinchot shows none of the comic talent that would later make him famous."
