= Happy Together (1989 American film) =

- Theatrical release poster
- Directed by: Mel Damski
- Written by: Craig J. Nevius
- Produced by: Jere Henshaw
- Starring: Patrick Dempsey; Helen Slater; Dan Schneider; Marius Weyers; Barbara Babcock
- Cinematography: Joe Pennella
- Edited by: O. Nicholas Brown
- Music by: Robert Folk; Robert J. Walsh
- Production company: Apollo Pictures
- Distributed by: Borde
- Release date: May 4, 1989 (United States)
- Running time: 102 minutes
- Country: United States
- Language: English
- Box office: $75,657

Happy Together is a 1989 American romantic comedy film directed by Mel Damski and starring Patrick Dempsey and Helen Slater.

== Plot ==
Christopher is a very serious-minded young man from Chicago. Enrolling into college in L.A. as a freshman he finds his roommate is someone named Alex, who turns out to be a woman from Park Avenue, NYC.

When Christopher arrives, he finds the room covered with his roommate's things. After both he and Alex are in the room, Chris sits down to confront him, he's surprised Alex is a girl. She moved in a week early and takes up most of the room. They have been placed together by a computer error. He finds the pairing intolerable and tries his best to find another place to live. The dorms are full and he is resigned, at least for the time being, to make the best of his current situation.

Alex, a seemingly extroverted party girl, shows little interest in academics and breezes into the room, disrupting and demanding full attention at any moment. After 'dinner together', which turns out to nibbling here and there in a supermarket, he gets enthusiastic about her. Buying her a bunch of helium balloons, he arrives at their building only to find her zip-off on Slash's motorcycle. She treats Chris as if he is simply there for her when she needs him.

Complete opposites, Chris thinks out and plans everything, whereas she constantly does things spontaneously. While scene painting, she instigates a paint fight, and later on, they play the game, 'Love Songs', name the musical, and finish the lyrics. They move up to the roof, doing a musical number.

They are both told that their work lacks something, for Chris in his writing and Alex in her acting. Alex tells Chris he needs a muse, and his writing professor reiterates this idea, write because he needs to or feels compelled to, not because he is obligated to. As fate intervenes, the two slowly begin to realize that they do like one another after all. It manifests itself as a sexual relationship wherein each finds a need filled by the other. Both of them improve once they get involved, as they invest more of themselves, it is visible in their craft.

Alex gets a nasty message written about her on the shower wall after she volunteers at a kissing booth. They fight, making up with dinner, however, Chris storms out when men continually buy her drinks.

Alex's ex, Slash, returns right before midterms, and he breaks Chris' arm. Having to get his arm plastered, he isn't able to study for midterms, so she suggests he put the answers on his cast. Caught, he can either redo the semester or leave.

Packing up, Chris is about to go, but confronts Alex, convincing her to take a chance on him. She agrees. In the closing credits, they both stayed and finished their degrees. They later moved to NYC to pursue their careers.

== Cast ==
- Patrick Dempsey as Christopher Wooden
- Helen Slater as Alexandra Page
- Dan Schneider as Stan
- Kevin Hardesty as 'Slash'
- Marius Weyers as Denny Dollenbacher
- Barbara Babcock as Ruth Carpenter
- Gloria Hayes as Luisa Dellacova
- Brad Pitt as Brian
- Aaron Harnick as Wally
- Ron Sterling as Trevor
- Eric Lumbard as Gary
- Michael D. Clarke as Steve
- Wendy Lee Marconi as Dory
- Yvette Rambo as Jill
- Shawne Rowe as Geri
