= Lisa Lillien =

American entrepreneur

- Born: Cedarhurst, New York, U.S.
- Education: University at Albany, SUNY (BA)
- Occupations: Cookbook author; blogger; TV personality
- Years active: 2004–present
- Spouse: Dan Schneider (m. 2002)

Lisa Lillien Schneider is an American entrepreneur. She is the creator of the Hungry Girl brand, including email-subscription, cookbooks, low-calorie recipes, and life hacks.

== Background ==
Lillien's roots are in magazines and, more generally, entertainment. Lillien is the daughter of Maurice Lillien (1933–2022) and Florence Lillien, and has two siblings, Jay and Meri, and is the aunt of Lauren, Max and Jake. She grew up on Long Island and identifies as Jewish ("a nice Jewish girl from Long Island").

She graduated from Lawrence High School in 1983. She does not have a degree in nutrition, but uses the neologism foodologist due to obsession with food. She received a B.A. in communication from University at Albany, SUNY in 1987. Directly from college she became editor-in-chief at Tutti Frutti (teen-fan magazine, Jimmijack Publishing, 1987–1991).

== Career ==
=== Business ===
For five years, Lillien was online executive producer for TV Land and director of convergence development at Nickelodeon online. Next she was a producer for new media at Telepictures (Warner Bros.). She quit her job and started the Hungry Girl brand in 2004, with a weekly email (originally Tips and Tricks ... for Hungry Chicks). She has averaged over one million subscribers. The content consists mainly of recipes and life hacks, written in a pink, exclamation-point, LOL style; or as Lillien once put it, "getting excited over silly things [...] When I launched Hungry Girl, I wanted it to be the same...writing style[:] conversational and excited, [like] writing about teen stars, and pop stars...".

Regular advertisers across media have included Weight Watchers, Dreyers light ice cream, and General Mills, later including Green Giant, Quaker, The Laughing Cow cheeses, and Beyond Better Foods.

=== Media ===
As a writer, Lillien has had a weekly column on the Weight Watchers website and has written for Redbook magazine. She has appeared on cooking shows like Rachael Ray.

In 2011 and 2012, Triage Entertainment produced 36 episodes of a Hungry Girl program; they aired on Cooking Channel and Food Network. The recipes of the 2012 season remain online.

The Meredith Corporation began a quarterly Hungry Girl magazine in 2018.

== Personal life ==
In 2002, Lillien married writer/producer Dan Schneider. The couple have no children, but they have a dog named Lolly, and live in Hidden Hills, California.

== Books ==
- Hungry Girl Clean & Hungry: Easy All-Natural Recipes for Healthy Eating in the Real World (April 5, 2016)
- The Hungry Girl Diet Cookbook: Healthy Recipes for Mix-n-Match Meals & Snacks (December 29, 2015)
- The Hungry Girl Diet: Big Portions. Big Results. Drop 10 Pounds in 4 Weeks (March 25, 2014)
- Hungry Girl 200 Under 200 Just Desserts: 200 Recipes Under 200 Calories (May 7, 2013)
- Hungry Girl to the Max!: The Ultimate Guilt-Free Cookbook (October 16, 2012)
- By Lisa Lillien – Hungry Girl 300 Under 300: 300 Breakfast, Lunch & Dinner Dishes Under 300 Calories (February 27, 2011)
- Hungry Girl 300 Under 300: 300 Breakfast, Lunch & Dinner Dishes Under 300 Calories (March 29, 2011)
- Hungry Girl Supermarket Survival: Aisle by Aisle, HG-Style! (October 11, 2011)
- Hungry Girl 1-2-3: The Easiest, Most Delicious, Guilt-Free Recipes on the Planet (March 30, 2010)
- Hungry Girl Happy Hour: 75 Recipes for Amazingly Fantastic Guilt-Free Cocktails and Party Foods (June 22, 2010)
- Hungry Girl: 200 Under 200: 200 Recipes Under 200 Calories (April 14, 2009)
- Hungry Girl: The Official Survival Guides (April 14, 2009)
- Hungry Girl Chew the Right Thing: Supreme Makeovers for 50 Foods You Crave (December 8, 2009)
- Hungry Girl: Recipes and Survival Strategies for Guilt-Free Eating in the Real World (April 29, 2008)
