= The 'Burbs =

1989 film by Joe Dante

- Theatrical release poster
- Directed by: Joe Dante
- Written by: Dana Olsen
- Produced by: Larry Brezner; Michael Finnell; Dana Olsen
- Starring: Tom Hanks; Bruce Dern; Carrie Fisher; Rick Ducommun; Corey Feldman
- Cinematography: Robert M. Stevens
- Edited by: Marshall Harvey
- Music by: Jerry Goldsmith
- Production company: Imagine Entertainment
- Distributed by: Universal Pictures
- Release date: February 17, 1989
- Running time: 101 minutes
- Country: United States
- Language: English
- Budget: $18 million
- Box office: $49.1 million

The 'Burbs is a 1989 American dark comedy film directed by Joe Dante and written by Dana Olsen. It stars Tom Hanks, Bruce Dern, Carrie Fisher, Rick Ducommun, Corey Feldman, Wendy Schaal, Henry Gibson and Gale Gordon.

The film pokes fun at suburban environments and their sometimes eccentric dwellers, featuring a family man who suspects the "eccentric" new neighbors are hiding a dark secret. A modest financial success which earned mixed critical reviews, the film is now regarded as a cult classic.

== Plot ==
Suburban homeowner Ray Peterson is home on a week-long vacation. Late one night, he hears strange noises coming from the basement of his reclusive new next-door neighbors, the Klopeks. Ray and his other neighbors—nosy Art Weingartner, paranoid Vietnam War veteran Mark Rumsfield and teenager Ricky Butler—gradually suspect the Klopeks may be ritualistic murderers. On another night, they observe the youngest Klopek drive an oversized garbage bag to their curbside garbage can and aggressively mash it down. Later that night, during a rainstorm, Ray sees the Klopeks digging in their backyard. In the morning, Ray, Mark and Art search the garbage truck for human remains after the Klopeks' trash is collected, but find nothing.

Mark's wife, Bonnie, finds their neighbor Walter's dog, Queenie, running loose. Worried about the elderly man, Ray, Art, Ricky and the Rumsfields enter Walter's house and find overturned chairs and Walter's toupée, but no Walter. Ray collects Queenie, leaves a note for Walter, slips the toupée back in through the mail slot, and sees one of the Klopeks watching him from their house. Ray and Art theorize that the Klopeks have used Walter as a human sacrifice, becoming further convinced when Ray's dog Vince digs up a human femur from along the Klopeks' property line.

Ray's wife, Carol, tired of the men's behavior, organizes a welcome visit to the Klopeks. While the Petersons and Rumsfields meet Hans, Reuben and Dr. Werner Klopek, Art snoops around the Klopeks' backyard and is chased out by their large dog, Landrue. Afterward, Ray reveals to Art and Mark that he found Walter's mail and toupée at the Klopeks', proving they had been in Walter's house.

The next day, Ray sends Carol and their son, Dave, to visit Carol's sister. When the Klopeks leave, Art and Ray enter their backyard to search for Walter's corpse while Mark acts as lookout. Ricky invites a group of his friends over to his house to watch Ray, Art, and Mark in their attempt to find evidence against the Klopek family. Finding nothing in the yard, Art and Ray break into the Klopeks' basement, discover what appears to be a crematorium, and dig deep into the floor in search of human remains. The Klopeks return, accompanied by a policeman after having seen their basement lights on. Ray strikes a gas line with his pickaxe; Art escapes before the house explodes and Ray emerges from the inferno scorched and dishevelled just as Carol and Dave return home.

Walter arrives home during the commotion, having spent a few days in the hospital due to heart palpitations. He had asked the Klopeks to collect his mail for him and they had mistakenly gathered up his toupée as well. When Art intends to continue looking for evidence against the Klopeks, Ray snaps and goes on a tirade, declaring that he and the others were wrong and have been the ones acting like lunatics all along, before climbing into an ambulance. Werner enters and accuses Ray of having seen a human skull in the basement furnace, revealing that the Klopeks murdered the previous homeowners, the Knapps, so they could live in their house, and that Ray and the others were right about the Klopeks all along.

Werner attempts to lethally inject Ray as Hans drives the ambulance away. Their struggle causes the ambulance to crash into Art's house, ejecting Werner and Ray, who then makes a citizen's arrest. Ricky uncovers human skeletal remains in the Klopeks' car trunk. The Klopeks are arrested and charges against Ray are dropped. While Art speaks to a TV news crew and explains how suburbanites are out to get criminals in their neighborhoods, Ray states that he and his family are going away for a while and asks Ricky to watch over the neighborhood.

== Cast ==
- Tom Hanks as Ray Peterson
- Bruce Dern as Mark Rumsfield
- Carrie Fisher as Carol Peterson
- Rick Ducommun as Art Weingartner
- Corey Feldman as Ricky Butler
- Wendy Schaal as Bonnie Rumsfield
- Henry Gibson as Dr. Werner Klopek
- Brother Theodore as Uncle Reuben Klopek
- Courtney Gains as Hans Klopek
- Gale Gordon as Walter Seznick
- Cory Danziger as Dave Peterson
- Heather Haase as Ricky's girlfriend
- Nick Katt as Steve Kuntz, Ricky's friend
- Brenda Benner as Walter's daughter
- Patrika Darbo as Suzette Weingartner
- Darla as Queenie the dog

Additional minor roles were played by Dick Miller and Robert Picardo as garbagemen Vic and Joe; Franklyn Ajaye and Rance Howard as detectives; Bill Stevenson, Gary Hays and Carey Scott as Ricky's friends; and Kevin Gage and Dana Olsen as policemen.

== Production ==
=== Writing ===
Screenwriter Dana Olsen based the script on experiences from his own childhood: "I had an ultranormal middle-class upbringing, but our town had its share of psychos. There was a legendary hatchet murder in the thirties, and every once in a while, you'd pick up the local paper and read something like 'LIBRARIAN KILLS FAMILY, SELF.' As a kid, it was fascinating to think that Mr. Flanagan down the street could turn out to be Jack the Ripper. And where there's fear, there's comedy. So I approached The 'Burbs as Ozzie and Harriet meet Charles Manson."

Olsen's script attracted producer Larry Brezner, who brought it to Imagine Films. It was greeted with a warm reception from Imagine co-founder Brian Grazer: "I liked the concept of a regular guy taking a vacation in his own neighborhood, plus it was funny and well written. It suddenly dawned on me that Joe Dante would be fantastic [as a director] because it's a mixture of comedy, horror, and reality."

Dante, who had directed Gremlins and Innerspace, and his partner, Michael Finnell, were immediately impressed by the concept of the movie. Dante, who specialized in offbeat subject matter, was intrigued by the blending of real-life situations with elements of the supernatural: "When I tell people about the story, a remarkable number say, 'On my grandmother's block, there were people like that. They never mowed their lawn, and they never came out, and they let their mail stack up, and nobody knew who they were.' And I must confess that in my own neighborhood there's a house like that, falling to wrack and ruin. I think this is perhaps a more common event than most people are aware of."

Dante had been developing Little Man Tate (later made by Jodie Foster) but that project collapsed when he was offered the script which was then called Bay Window. Dante recalled, "I liked the characters. But the script ended with the hero being killed and driven away in an ambulance by a guy that he's been persecuting through the movie, the guy who then turns out to really be guilty. And the fact that the guy is guilty turns out to be sort of a Twilight Zone surprise, an O. Henry twist ending. And I thought, 'Well, that's OK.' But then they decided that we wanted to hire Tom Hanks. And suddenly, it was like, 'Well, you know we can't kill Tom Hanks. What are we going to do? We'll have to change it'."

=== Casting ===
Dante, Brezner, and Finnell agreed that Hanks would be the most suitable actor to portray the married Ray Peterson, a conservative man who tries to introduce excitement into his life by investigating the activities of his strange neighbors. Dante referred to Hanks as "the reigning everyman, a guy that everybody can identify with", comparing him to James Stewart. Brezner echoed this sentiment, saying "Hanks is an actor capable of acting funny rather than funny acting. He also has no problem with transition from comedy to pathos, as he showed in Nothing in Common, and he's now proving himself as one of the country's most versatile actors."

Hanks accepted the role of Ray with enthusiasm, later saying "What's so bizarrely interesting about this black psychocomedy is that the stuff that goes on in real life in a regular neighborhood will make your hair stand up on the back of your neck." He was also intrigued by his character's distinctive personality traits: "Sometimes there's more of an opportunity to create than others. Here's a guy with a great life – a nice house, a wife, a beautiful tree, a nice neighborhood – and he's happy. Next day, he hates it all. I thought something must've happened to him offstage. And that's the challenge for me of the part: to communicate Ray's offscreen dilemma. One of the reasons Ray doesn't go away on vacation is because it's another extension of the normalcy he's fallen into. So he thinks he'll try a more Bohemian thing, which is to just hang around the house. With a week's worth of free time on his hands, Ray is drawn into the pre-occupations of his neighbors, who always seem to be at home. But what I did is just back-story embellishment that any actor will do. Perhaps from my repertory experience. I don't ask a director for motivation. If he says, 'Go over to the window', I find the reason myself."

Hanks found admiration for Dante's directorial style, saying "Joe has a stylized, visionary way of looking at the entire movie. It's pure film-making – the story is told from the camera's point of view, and that's a type of movie I haven't made." Dante, in turn, praised his star. "The most impressive thing about Tom Hanks as a comic actor is how effortless he makes it seem. He actually is very diligent about his acting, but his comic sense of what is going to work – and what isn't – is really unparalleled."

Dante's laid-back, casual style encouraged improvisation among the actors. He noted, "Tom doesn't like to do scenes the way they're always done. He goes out of his way to put a different spin on everything and his being good as he is and as open as he is encouraged the other actors to do the same. It set a tone for the movie that made it a lot of fun to make."

=== Filming ===
The 'Burbs was filmed entirely at Universal Studios over ten weeks in the summer of 1988, mainly on the Colonial Street set on the back lot, which served as the Mayfield Place cul-de-sac. "I can't think of many pictures since Lifeboat that all take place in the same area," Dante said as production got under way. "There was a lot of temptation to broaden it and go outside the neighborhood, but it seemed to violate the spirit of the piece. It's almost the kind of thing that could be a stage play except that you could never do on-stage what we've done in this movie."

The Colonial Street set had been used in 1987's Dragnet, also starring Hanks. At the time The 'Burbs began production, it was being used as the location for The New Leave It to Beaver television series. To ensure the set would fit the tone of his film, Dante said, "I asked [production designer] James Spencer, a veteran of Poltergeist and Gremlins, if he thought he could turn that street into the neighborhood we needed in that period of time."

Spencer rose to the challenge, and within a few days they began work on sketching out the proposed designs for the sets. Spencer observed, "We had to be on the spot. Due to the lack of time, it would have been ludicrous to do our drawing elsewhere." The orchestral soundtrack for the film was composed by Jerry Goldsmith.

Dante recalled "we shot, in fact, three endings for the picture. None of them, I think, really worked. But also, because of the writers’ strike, we had to sort of make it up as we were going along." Dante says the preview audience did not like the original ending which was more critical of the lead characters, so he changed it.

== Release ==
=== Box office ===
The film opened at number 1 with $11,101,197 in its opening weekend (February 17–20, 1989). Overall, in the US, the film made $36,601,993 and $49,101,993 worldwide.

=== Critical reaction ===
Roger Ebert of the Chicago Sun-Times gave it two out of four stars, writing "The 'Burbs tries to position itself somewhere between Beetlejuice and The Twilight Zone, but it lacks the dementia of the first and the wicked intelligence of the second and turns instead into a long shaggy dog story." Vincent Canby of The New York Times gave The 'Burbs a negative review, calling it "as empty as something can be without creating a vacuum".

On review aggregator Rotten Tomatoes, the film has an approval rating of 57% based on 46 reviews. The site's critical consensus reads, "The 'Burbs has an engaging premise, likable cast and Joe Dante at the helm – so the mixed-up genre exercise they produce can't help but feel like a disappointment."

On Metacritic, the film has a weighted average score of 45 out of 100, based on 20 critics, indicating "mixed or average reviews". Audiences polled by CinemaScore gave the film an average grade of "C" on an A+ to F scale.

=== Home media ===
In 2014, Arrow Video released The 'Burbs on Blu-ray in the UK with a new 2K scan of the inter-positive. The edition included a commentary by screenwriter Dana Olsen, a newly commissioned feature-length documentary titled There Goes the Neighborhood: The Making of 'The 'Burbs'. In the United States, the film was first given a Blu-ray release in 2016 by Universal Studios. This release was criticized for poor quality and being a bare bones release. In 2018, Shout! Factory re-released the film on Blu-ray with the transfer and majority of the special features from the 2014 Arrow release from the UK. Shout! re-released the film in 2026 on Ultra HD Blu-ray, featuring a 4K restoration from the film’s original camera negative, plus 2 new audio commentaries and the same bonus features from the 2018 Blu-ray.

In 2018, the soundtrack album received a release on LP record on the Waxwork Records label, as an expanded double-LP package. Additional music used in the film but not included on the soundtrack albums includes "Machine" by Circus of Power; "Se Sei Qualcuno è Colpa Mia" by Ennio Morricone; "Questa o Quella" by Enrico Caruso; and "Locked in a Cage", "Make Some Noise" and "Bloodstone" by Jetboy.

== TV series adaptation ==
In September 2024, Peacock ordered a series adaptation of the film from Universal Content Productions. Keke Palmer headlined the series, with Brian Grazer and Seth MacFarlane producing via Imagine Entertainment and Fuzzy Door Productions, respectively. The series premiered on February 8, 2026, on Peacock.
