= Darla (dog) =

Dog who appeared in several films

- Darla in The Silence of the Lambs
- Species: Canis familiaris
- Breed: Bichon Frisé
- Sex: Female
- Born: 1975
- Died: 1992 (aged 16–17); Thousand Oaks, California
- Occupation: Actress
- Years active: 1985–1992
- Known for: Precious in The Silence of the Lambs
- Owner: Christie Miele

Darla (1975–1992) was a Bichon frise dog best known for her acting role as Precious in the 1991 thriller The Silence of the Lambs. Darla also appeared in several other films, including Batman Returns (1992).

== Career and popularity ==
Darla began her career in the 1985 film Pee-wee's Big Adventure as Pink Poodle and later appeared in the 1989 film The 'Burbs, starring Tom Hanks. Her most notable role was as Precious in the 1991 film The Silence of the Lambs. Her final role was in the 1992 film Batman Returns, where she played Ratty Poodle.

=== Notable scenes ===
In The Silence of the Lambs, the following famous quote by serial killer Buffalo Bill (Ted Levine) is punctuated by a bark from Precious, whom he holds in his arms: “It rubs the lotion on its skin, or else it gets the hose again!” This scene demonstrates that, despite his complete disregard for human life, Bill genuinely cared for the little dog. This is further evidenced by the small dog bed placed next to his sewing machine. Later in the film, Buffalo Bill's intended next victim, Catherine, manages to lure Precious into the dry well where she is being held captive. This stalls Buffalo Bill long enough for help to arrive. The dog is seen again after the ordeal, still being held by Catherine as she is placed in an ambulance.

In Batman Returns, Darla makes her final film appearance, credited as "Ratty Poodle". However, her fur was intentionally roughed up for the role, making her barely recognizable. In one scene, The Penguin and his crew confront Batman. One member of the crew, a blonde woman dressed in Victorian-era clothing, carries Darla. In this movie, Darla is portrayed as a significant nuisance for Batman. She runs to catch Batman's self-operating Batarang, which his enemies use in an attempt to frame him for the murder of the Ice Princess, thereby thwarting The Penguin's plan.

== Life and legacy ==
Darla worked with trainer Christie Miele on The Silence of the Lambs. According to Miele, Darla's "big thing" was stealing socks. She was highly intelligent and loved being around people. As noted in Comic Book Resources, "Although many won't recall Darla's impact on these films, there's no denying that her skills as an actor have linked two excellent movies and proved that she was one of the best dogs of her time."

Darla retired to Thousand Oaks, California, in 1992 and died later that year at the age of 16 or 17.

In the 2021 sequel television series Clarice, the role of Precious was taken over by a Bichon Frisé named Kendall.

== Filmography ==
- Pee-wee's Big Adventure (1985) as Pink Poodle
- Coming to America (1988) as Dottie
- The 'Burbs (1989) as Queenie
- The Silence of the Lambs (1991) as Precious
- Batman Returns (1992) as Ratty Poodle

== Television ==
- Coach (1990) as Watkin's Poodle
- Eerie, Indiana (1991) as Fifi

== See also ==
- List of individual dogs
