= Hungry Girl =

American lifestyle email service

- Type: Private
- Industry: Food, Diet
- Founded: 2004
- Headquarters: Los Angeles, California, U.S.
- Key people: Lisa Lillien, Founder and CEO
- Number of employees: 5+
- Website: www.hungry-girl.com

Hungry Girl is a free daily e-mail subscription service about healthy eating that launched in May 2004. Approximately one million people receive HG's daily emails.

Hungry Girl is run by Lisa Lillien,a media executive, who has also held positions at Nickelodeon and Warner Bros.

In addition to daily e-mails, Hungry Girl content is seen regularly on Yahoo, WeightWatchers.com, Seventeen magazine, People Style Watch, the New York Daily News, Redbook Magazine, and on the TV shows Extra, The Rachael Ray Show and Good Morning America. The first Hungry Girl book was released on April 29, 2008, under the title Recipes and Survival Strategies for Guilt-Free Eating in the Real World. The book was published and distributed by St. Martins Press, and debuted at #2 on the New York Times bestseller list. The next two Hungry Girl books, "200 Under 200" and "Hungry Girl 1-2-3" debuted at #1 on the New York Times bestseller list.

A Hungry Girl television show premiered on Cooking Channel in January 2011. Later that year, the series moved to Food Network and was cancelled after 2 seasons.

== Bibliography ==
- Recipes and Survival Strategies for Guilt-Free Eating in the Real World (2008)
- 200 Under 200: 200 Recipes Under 200 Calories (2009)
- Hungry Girl Chew the Right Thing Recipe Cards: Supreme Makeovers for 50 Foods You Crave (2009)
- Hungry Girl 1-2-3: The Easiest, Most Delicious, Guilt-Free Recipes on the Planet (2010)
- Happy Hour: 75 Recipes for Amazingly Fantastic Guilt-Free Cocktails and Party Foods (2010)
- Hungry Girl 300 Under 300: 300 Breakfast, Lunches & Dinner Dishes Under 300 Calories (2011)
- Hungry Girl Supermarket Survival: Aisle by Aisle, HG-Style! (2011)
- Hungry Girl to the Max!: The Ultimate Guilt-Free Cookbook (2012)
- Hungry Girl 200 Under 200 Just Desserts: 200 Recipes Under 200 Calories (2013)
- The Hungry Girl Diet: Big Portions. Big Results. Drop 10 Pounds in 4 Weeks (2014)
- The Hungry Girl Diet Cookbook: Healthy Recipes for Mix-n-Match Meals & Snacks (2015)
- Hungry Girl Clean & Hungry: Easy All-Natural Recipes for Healthy Eating in the Real World (2016)
- Hungry Girl Clean & Hungry Obsessed! (2017)
- Hungry Girl Simply 6: All-Natural Recipes with 6 Ingredients or Less (2019)
- Hungry Girl Fast & Easy: All Natural Recipes in 30 Minutes or Less (2020)
- Hungry Girl Simply Comfort: Feel-Good Favorites for Your Slow Cooker & Air Fryer (2022)
