= Dana Olsen =

American actor, film producer and screenwriter

Dana Olsen is an American actor, film producer and screenwriter. He is the co-creator of the comedy television series Henry Danger with Dan Schneider. His written works include Henry Danger, George of the Jungle, The 'Burbs, Inspector Gadget.

== Career ==
Dana Olsen wrote It Came from Hollywood (1982) directed by filmmakers Malcolm Leo and Andrew Solt. He wrote and produced The 'Burbs directed by Joe Dante. In Making the Grade, he played Palmer Woodrow(1984). Olsen also wrote Inspector Gadget (1999) based on the media franchise of the same name. In 2014, Dana Olsen, along with television producer Dan Schneider, created the Nickelodeon television series Henry Danger.

== Filmography ==
Creator:

- Henry Danger (2014-2020)
- Danger Force (2020-2024)
- Henry Danger: The Movie (2025)

=== Writer ===
- Joanie Loves Chachi ("Fonzie's Visit" episode, 1982)
- It Came from Hollywood (1982)
- Wacko (1982)
- Going Berserk (1983)
- The 'Burbs (1989)
- Memoirs of an Invisible Man (1992)
- George of the Jungle (1997)
- Sammy the Screenplay (1997)
- Inspector Gadget (1999)
- Henry Danger (2014–2015)

=== Actor ===
- Making the Grade (1984) .... Palmer Woodrow
- The 'Burbs (1989) .... Cop
- Sammy the Screenplay (1997) ... Sr. Executive

=== Producer ===
- The 'Burbs (1989) (co-producer)
- Henry Danger (2014-2015) [co-executive producer)
