= Dan Schneider =

American television producer and actor (born 1966)

- Born: Daniel James Schneider; January 14, 1966 (age 60); Memphis, Tennessee, U.S.
- Occupations: Producer; screenwriter; actor
- Years active: 1984–present
- Organization: Schneider's Bakery
- Spouse: Lisa Lillien (m. 2002)
- Website: danschneider.com

Daniel James Schneider (born January 14, 1966) is an American television producer, screenwriter, and actor. He created and produced a string of children's shows on Nickelodeon from 1994 to 2019. In the years since 2018, he has faced significant media coverage and controversy regarding allegations of inappropriate behavior.

Schneider started his career acting in supporting roles in several teen comedy films of the 1980s such as Making the Grade (1984), Better Off Dead (1985), Hot Resort (1985), Happy Together (1989), and The Big Picture (1989). On television, he played Dennis Blunden on the ABC television sitcom Head of the Class (1986–1991). In 1993, he played Walter Peters in the ABC sitcom Home Free which ran for only one season. Schneider is the co-president of his production company Schneider's Bakery, which he founded in 1996.

He changed his career to working in children's television specifically for Nickelodeon. There, Schneider started as a writer and producer on shows such as All That (1994–2005), and Kenan & Kel (1996–2000) before creating The Amanda Show (1999–2002) and co-creating and executive producing the UPN series What I Like About You (2002–2006). He gained fame for serving as the creator, executive producer and writer for numerous children's shows such as Drake & Josh (2004–2007), Zoey 101 (2005–2008), iCarly (2007–2012), Victorious (2010–2013), Sam & Cat (2013–2014), and later Henry Danger (2014–2020), Game Shakers (2015–2019), and The Adventures of Kid Danger (2018). He also wrote and acted in the film Good Burger (1997) and wrote and co-produced the film Big Fat Liar (2002).

In the wake of the #MeToo movement, details of his alleged verbal abuse, sexual misconduct, and gender discrimination towards Nickelodeon employees, many of them underage, were made public beginning in 2018. In response to the accusations, Nickelodeon ended their long-time partnership with Schneider. After a three-year hiatus, he discussed writing and selling a new pilot to a different network. The Investigation Discovery docuseries Quiet on Set: The Dark Side of Kids TV (2024) detailed the numerous allegations against him of fostering a toxic workplace environment, which he has partly denied. Schneider filed a defamation lawsuit against the show's creators in May 2024.

== Early life ==
Daniel James Schneider was born in Memphis, Tennessee, on January 14, 1966. In high school, Schneider was involved in theater and was senior class president. He found work repairing computers upon returning to Memphis, but soon moved to Los Angeles to pursue a career in the entertainment industry.

== Career ==
=== 1984–1994: Career beginnings and acting roles ===
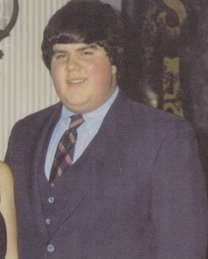
Schneider in 1982

In the 1980s, Schneider appeared in supporting roles in several films including the teen comedies Making the Grade (1984) starring Judd Nelson, and Better Off Dead (1985) with John Cusack. He also acted in comedy Hot Resort (1985), the romantic comedy Happy Together (1989) starring Patrick Dempsey, the comedy The Big Picture (1989) with Kevin Bacon and the drama Listen to Me (1989). In 1986, he played Dennis Blunden on the ABC television sitcom Head of the Class. The series ran for five seasons from 1986 to 1991. In 1993, he starred in the series Home Free.

Schneider co-hosted the 1988 Kids' Choice Awards, where he met Nickelodeon development executive Albie Hecht. In 1994, he played Shawn Eckardt in Tonya & Nancy: The Inside Story, one of two made-for-television films about the Tonya Harding–Nancy Kerrigan scandal. Schneider has made cameo appearances in TV series that he has helped to create and/or produce: All That, and its subsequent film Good Burger, Kenan & Kel, The Amanda Show, Zoey 101, iCarly, and Henry Danger. Schneider also does voice-overs in many projects.

=== 1993–2019: Nickelodeon showrunner ===
In 1993, Hecht, now head of production for the network, hired Schneider to work on a new sketch-comedy show for children called All That. After writing the pilot episode, Schneider worked as producer, executive producer, and writer on the show. Schneider quit All That after the fourth season to run The Amanda Show (1999–2002) starring Amanda Bynes. The show's ratings soon declined, and it was cancelled in the 2000–2001 season. Schneider himself often appeared on The Amanda Show as a frustrated old man who was frequently the victim of strange prank phone calls. Nickelodeon then asked Schneider to come back and revamp All That in 2001. Schneider agreed, and All That returned to Nickelodeon in 2002. It ran for another four seasons until 2005, bringing All That to the end of its 10-season run.

From 1996 to 1997, Schneider was an executive producer and a writer for Kenan & Kel starring Kenan Thompson and Kel Mitchell. Schneider guest-starred in an episode and was an executive producer during the first two seasons. He continued working as a consultant for the remainder of the series. He wrote the 1997 film Good Burger, starring Kenan and Kel and featuring Schneider himself in a supporting role. The film was spun off from a popular All That sketch produced by Schneider. While a modest commercial success it received negative reviews from critics with Roger Ebert of Chicago Sun-Times giving the film two stars out of four, writing "It didn't do much for me, but I am prepared to predict that its target audience will have a good time." In 1998, he began his career as a show creator with Guys Like Us for UPN. The series is one of only two series Schneider created that was produced for broadcast network television. The show was cancelled after its first season due to low ratings and poor reviews.

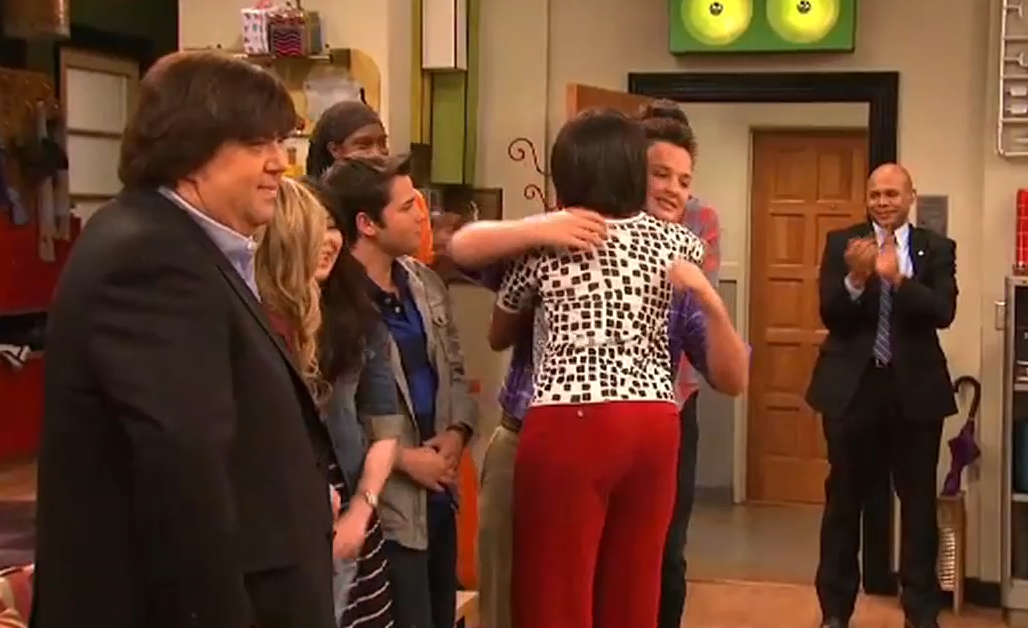
Schneider (left) on the set of iCarly, 2011

Schneider co-created What I Like About You with former Friends writer/producer Wil Calhoun. It premiered in 2002 on The WB and ran until 2006. Schneider was an executive producer during the show's first two seasons. He wrote and co-produced the comedy film Big Fat Liar (2002) starring Frankie Muniz, Amanda Bynes, and Paul Giamatti which earned a total of $52.4 million at the worldwide box office. Schneider returned to Nickelodeon in 2004 with the show Drake & Josh. The series starred Drake Bell and Josh Peck, who were actors on The Amanda Show, and Miranda Cosgrove, who would later star in another of Schneider's shows, iCarly. Overlapping both Drake & Josh and iCarly, Schneider created the show Zoey 101, which starred Jamie Lynn Spears. Zoey 101 was Schneider's first and to date only single-camera format program and the first to be presented in a letterboxed format. Schneider guest-starred in the Zoey 101 series finale "Chasing Zoey", playing a cab driver.

After the show ended in 2008, Schneider began working on a new project for one of the actresses, Victoria Justice. That show, Victorious, premiered in 2010 after the 2010 Kids' Choice Awards. It starred Justice, Ariana Grande, Elizabeth Gillies, Leon Thomas III, Matt Bennett and Avan Jogia. A dual-show spin-off of both iCarly and Victorious called Sam & Cat premiered in 2013. It was cancelled after 36 episodes. On March 9, 2010, it was announced that Schneider himself would sign a deal with Nickelodeon. Following the cancellation of Sam & Cat, Schneider co-created Henry Danger with Dana Olsen. The show premiered in 2014. The following year, Schneider created Game Shakers, which reunited him with actor and Nickelodeon veteran Kel Mitchell. Schneider also served as executive producer.

On March 26, 2018, Nickelodeon announced that it would not be extending its production deal with Schneider and his company Schneider's Bakery. In addition, the network also announced that his comedy Game Shakers would not be renewed for a fourth season. His remaining Nickelodeon comedy Henry Danger would be receiving a fifth season and a new showrunner.

=== 2020–present: Upcoming projects ===
After a three-year hiatus, Schneider announced that he had several new projects in development; The New York Times commented that he seemed "set on returning to television and reintroducing his brand of comedy to new audiences". In a June 2021 interview, he described an "ambitious and very different" television pilot that he had written and sold to a different network. Schneider said that this proposed show is aimed at more of an adult audience than his previous work.

== Reception ==
Prior to his departure from Nickelodeon and misconduct allegations, Schneider and his work were well received by critics. He had been described as "the Norman Lear of children's television" by The New York Times, "the Aaron Sorkin of teen sitcoms" by Gawker, and "the Willy Wonka of television" by Forbes. Variety cited his "Jedi Master-like acumen for creating shows that appeal to kids in the awkward years of adolescence".

== Misconduct allegations ==
Deadline Hollywood, the first to report about Nickelodeon parting ways with Schneider in March 2018, reported that there were complaints about Schneider's behavior. Nickelodeon did not respond to Deadline's report and Schneider's representative refused to comment.

In June 2021, The New York Times reported that Nickelodeon's decision to sever ties with Schneider came after its parent company ViacomCBS completed an internal investigation that found evidence of Schneider verbally abusing his colleagues. Some of his colleagues told the newspaper that they found him to be difficult to work with and "prone to tantrums and angry emails". The investigation did not find evidence of sexual misconduct. When asked about the allegations, Schneider defended his work and said that if people found him to be hard to work with, it was because he maintained "high standards" as showrunner.

In August 2022, Insider reported several new allegations from former actors and employees, including accusations of gender discrimination and asking for "massages from adult female colleagues". A person "close to Schneider" said Schneider "regrets ever asking anyone [for a massage] and agrees it was not appropriate". Russell Hicks, a former executive at Nickelodeon, denied allegations of "sexualized" scenes in Schneider's shows and claimed that, "everyday on every set, were the parents and caregivers and their friends watching every single frame of footage and listening to every joke. Every single thing that Dan ever did on any of his shows was carefully scrutinized and approved". In her 2022 memoir I'm Glad My Mom Died, former iCarly and Sam & Cat star Jennette McCurdy outlined her relationship with an abusive figure she only identified as "the Creator," who was widely reported to be Schneider.

The 2024 documentary miniseries Quiet on Set discussed Schneider's alleged toxic workplace behavior at Nickelodeon. He responded by apologizing for his treatment of colleagues, but denied other allegations regarding the sexualization of children in his past productions. Schneider received support from former Nickelodeon star Madisyn Shipman, who shared that she had "nothing but positive things to say" about Schneider based on her experience on set. In May 2024, Schneider filed a lawsuit against Warner Bros. Discovery (WBD), Sony Pictures Television, and the series' directors, claiming the docuseries defamed him by falsely implying he sexually abused child actors he worked with. In a statement, Schneider acknowledged "mistakes and poor judgment" exhibited during his time at Nickelodeon, and expressed that reactions to the series left him "no choice but to take legal action against the people behind it."

Schneider has also been accused of behaving inappropriately with some of the young actresses who appeared in shows he developed. Alexa Nikolas, who appeared in Zoey 101 for two seasons from 2004 to 2006, has said that, during her time on the show, she did "not feel safe" around Schneider, and that he had pressured her to wear revealing clothing and responded harshly to her complaints about the way her co-star Jamie Lynn Spears treated her. Lori Beth Denberg, who appeared in All That from 1994 to 1998, accused Schneider of touching her inappropriately, showing her pornography, and attempting to initiate phone sex with her when she was 19.

== Personal life ==
Schneider met food blogger Lisa Lillien at Nickelodeon in the 1990s, and the two were married in 2002. They lived in the Encino neighborhood of Los Angeles until 2016, when they purchased a $9 million mansion from heiress Lori Milgard in Hidden Hills, California. After being overweight for much of his life, Schneider revealed in 2021 that he had lost over 100 lb (45 kg) since departing from Nickelodeon.

== Filmography ==
=== Film ===
Year	Title	Credit	Notes
1984	Making the Grade	Blimp	
1985	Better Off Dead	Ricky Smith	
1985	Hot Resort	Chuck	
1989	Happy Together	Stan	
1989	Listen to Me	Nathan Gore	
1989	The Big Picture	Jonathan Tristan-Bennet	
1997	Good Burger	Mr. Bailey	Also screenwriter and co-producer
2002	Big Fat Liar	—N/a	Screenwriter, story, and producer

=== Television ===
Acting credits

Year	Title	Credit	Notes
1986–1991	Head of the Class	Dennis Blunden	
1993	Home Free	Walter Peters	
1994–2005	All That	Mr. Bailey / Know Your Stars Announcer / Various	Cameos
1994	Tonya and Nancy: The Inside Story	Shawn Eckardt	
1996	Kenan & Kel	Angus	"Baggin' Saggin' Kel" (season 1: episode 12)
2000–2001	The Amanda Show	Mr. Oldman	9 episodes
2004	Drake & Josh	Radio show host	Voice, "Number 1 Fan" (season 2, episode 15)
2008	Zoey 101	Taxi driver	"Chasing Zoey" (season 4: episode 12)
2008	The Mighty B!	Factory Manager	Voice, "Something's Wrong With This Taffy" (season 1: episode 13)
2012	iCarly	Meekalito / Police Officer / Various	9 episodes; cameos
2013–2014	Sam & Cat	Tandy (red robot)	Voice, recurring role

Creator and producer roles

Year	Title	Creator	Writer	Producer	Network	Notes
1994–2005	All That	No	Yes		Nickelodeon	Writer (Seasons 1–4, 6–10), producer (Seasons 1–2); Exec producer (Seasons 6–10), guest star
1996–2000	Kenan & Kel	No	Yes		Nickelodeon	Writer (Seasons 1–2), exec producer (Seasons 1–2); consultant (Seasons 3–4), guest star
1998–1999	Guys Like Us	Yes	No	Executive	UPN	
1999–2002	The Amanda Show	Yes	Yes		Nickelodeon	Also director (Seasons 2–3), recurring guest star
2002–2006	What I Like About You	Co-creator	Yes	Executive	The WB	Executive producer (Seasons 1–2); executive consultant (Seasons 3–4)
2004–2007	Drake & Josh	Yes	Yes	Executive	Nickelodeon	
2005–2008	Zoey 101	Yes	Yes	Executive	Nickelodeon	Guest star ("Chasing Zoey")
2007–2012	iCarly	Yes	Yes	Executive	Nickelodeon	Guest star
2010–2013	Victorious	Yes	Yes	Executive	Nickelodeon	Actor (voice)
2013–2014	Sam & Cat	Yes	Yes	Executive	Nickelodeon	
2014–2020	Henry Danger	Co-creator	Yes	Executive	Nickelodeon	Also director and guest star
2015–2019	Game Shakers	Yes	Yes	Executive	Nickelodeon	
2018	The Adventures of Kid Danger	Yes	Yes	Executive	Nickelodeon	
2019	All That season 11	Yes	No		Nickelodeon	Revival
2020–2024	Danger Force	Co-creator	No		Nickelodeon	Co-creator (credit only)
2021–2023	iCarly (2021 TV series)	Yes	No		Paramount+	Creator (credit only)
2026–present	Hollywood Arts	Yes	No		Netflix	Creator (credit only)

== Awards and nominations ==
Year	Award	Category	Nominated production	Result	Ref.
1995	CableACE Award	Children's Series – 7 and Older	All That	Nominated	
2000	Burbank International Children's Film Festival Award	Best Short Comedy	The Amanda Show	Won	
2005	Primetime Emmy Award	Outstanding Children's Program	Zoey 101	Nominated	
2009	Primetime Emmy Award	Outstanding Children's Program	iCarly	Nominated	
2010	BAFTA Children's Award	Best International	iCarly	Nominated	
2010	BAFTA Children's Award	Best International	Victorious	Nominated	
2010	Primetime Emmy Award	Outstanding Children's Program	iCarly	Nominated	
2011	Primetime Emmy Award	Outstanding Children's Program	iCarly	Nominated	
2011	Primetime Emmy Award	Outstanding Children's Program	Victorious	Nominated	
2014	Nickelodeon Kids' Choice Award	Lifetime Achievement Award		Won	
