= Henry Danger =

American superhero comedy television series

- Genre: Comedy; Superhero
- Created by: Dan Schneider & Dana Olsen
- Starring: Jace Norman; Cooper Barnes; Riele Downs; Sean Ryan Fox; Ella Anderson; Michael D. Cohen
- Theme music composer: Michael Corcoran; Zack Hexum; Dan Schneider
- Composers: Michael Corcoran; Zack Hexum
- Country of origin: United States
- Original language: English
- No. of seasons: 5
- No. of episodes: 121 (list of episodes)

Production
- Executive producers: Dan Schneider; Christopher J. Nowak; Jake Farrow
- Producers: Christopher J. Nowak; Jeffrey Goldstein; Kim Sherwood; Andrew Hirsch; Jace Norman
- Camera setup: Multi-camera
- Running time: 21–27 minutes
- Production companies: Schneider's Bakery; Nickelodeon Productions

Original release
- Network: Nickelodeon
- Release: July 26, 2014 – March 21, 2020

Related
- The Adventures of Kid Danger (2018); Danger Force (2020–2024); Henry Danger: The Movie (2025)

Henry Danger is an American superhero comedy television series created by Dan Schneider and Dana Olsen that aired on Nickelodeon from July 26, 2014, to March 21, 2020. The series stars Jace Norman, Cooper Barnes, Riele Downs, Sean Ryan Fox, Ella Anderson, and Michael D. Cohen.

== Premise ==
Henry Hart is a 13-year-old boy who lives in the town of Swellview. He lands a part-time job as Kid Danger, a sidekick of Swellview's well-known superhero Captain Man. Captain Man tells Henry not to tell anybody about his job, so he attempts to keep it a secret from his best friends, Charlotte and Jasper, his younger sister, Piper, and his parents. Henry goes to a shop called "Junk 'n' Stuff" which has a secret lair called the Man Cave hidden underneath where Captain Man does his work. Captain Man says he will not be around for long and needs help; soon enough, he will need someone to take his place when he is gone.

== Episodes ==
Season	Episodes	Originally released	
Season	Episodes	First released	Last released
1	25	July 26, 2014	May 16, 2015
2	18	September 12, 2015	July 17, 2016
3	19	September 17, 2016	October 7, 2017
4	20	October 21, 2017	October 20, 2018
5	39	November 3, 2018	March 21, 2020

== Cast and characters ==
- Jace Norman as Henry Hart / Kid Danger, a 13-year-old boy who becomes the sidekick of Captain Man. He is an average kid with friends and an after school job as Captain Man's superhero sidekick. Thanks to his skills and gadgets, Kid Danger has no problem helping Captain Man on his missions. He will always be with his friends even if he has to go save the world. In "Hour of Power", Henry gains super-quick reflexes during the fight against Captain Man's former sidekick Drex.
- Cooper Barnes as Ray Manchester / Captain Man, a superhero who trains Henry. About 25 years ago, Ray Manchester's scientist father Dr. Carl Manchester accidentally pulled a lever on his Trans-Molecular Densitizer that Ray crashed into when riding his skateboard causing him to be indestructible and yet can still feel some pain for a short time. Now he is a crime-fighting superhero. He needed a sidekick, so he chooses Henry. Captain Man's Man-Cave is located underneath "Junk 'n' Stuff". Ray is shown to have a crush on Mrs. Hart despite the fact that she is married, which sometimes irritates Henry and he tries to force Ray to go do something else for the time being.
- Riele Downs as Charlotte, one of Henry's best friends. She is sarcastic, clever, and smart. She is the "sass master" of the bunch, always there to snap everyone back to reality. She and Henry have been best friends for a long time and therefore she is close enough to him to tell it like it is. She is a big fan of Captain Man. In the fourth episode, Charlotte figures out Henry's secret and gets a job as Henry and Ray's manager.
- Sean Ryan Fox as Jasper Dunlop, one of Henry's best friends. He is full of ideas, but most of them are not good. He has been Henry's best friend since preschool. He is a bucket collector who always embarrasses Henry and Charlotte. He also asks a lot of questions and is a big fan of Captain Man as well. In the episode "I Know Your Secret", Henry reveals to Jasper that he is Kid Danger, and is taken into the business.
- Ella Anderson as Piper Hart, Henry's little sister who is a fan of Captain Man. She and Henry are not that close. Piper claims that she hates her life and overreacts to various issues mostly about social media. Piper is also shown to be annoyed with Jasper's antics and seems to have a big rivalry with him.
- Michael D. Cohen as Schwoz (recurring, seasons 1–4; main, season 5), a worker for Captain Man who handled the equipment in the man cave as he was the one who built it. Ray and Schwoz's friendship was strained when Schwoz stole Ray's girlfriend. They eventually made up when Henry convinced Ray to forgive Schwoz. Since then, Schwoz has come up with various inventions to help Captain Man and Kid Danger, though at times he can be weird and funny, which makes Henry and Ray furious. He sometimes refers to his sister as someone who looks like a horse. He also had a shape-shifting android as his "girlfriend".

== Production ==
The series was picked up with an initial production order of 20 episodes on March 13, 2014, later expanding to 26 episodes. On July 26, 2014, the series started airing with a one-hour special as the first episode. Series creator Dan Schneider stated on Twitter that a character from one of his previous series would make a guest appearance on the series.

On November 18, 2014, the series was renewed for a second season. The series was renewed for a third season on March 2, 2016. On November 16, 2016, the series was renewed for a fourth season.

In March 2018, Jace Norman indicated in an interview with Extra that the series was to be picked up for a fifth season. On July 27, 2018, the series was renewed for a fifth season of 20 episodes. In addition, Michael D. Cohen had been promoted to main cast, Christopher J. Nowak to showrunner, and Jake Farrow to executive producer. On December 3, 2018, it was announced that Nickelodeon had ordered 10 additional episodes for the fifth season, bringing the series to 117 produced episodes. On April 3, 2019, it was announced that Nickelodeon had ordered 10 additional episodes for the fifth season, bringing the series to 127 produced episodes, with 128 episodes ultimately being produced. On May 11, 2019, it was announced that Frankie Grande would return for a special musical episode that premiered on July 27, 2019. On December 7, 2019, Nickelodeon began advertising that the "final episodes" of the series would begin airing in January 2020.

== Broadcast ==
In the United States, the series premiered with a one-hour special on Nickelodeon on July 26, 2014. The first season concluded on May 16, 2015. The second season premiered on September 12, 2015, and concluded on July 17, 2016. The third season premiered on September 17, 2016, and concluded on October 7, 2017. The fourth season premiered on October 21, 2017, and concluded on October 20, 2018. The fifth season premiered on November 3, 2018, and concluded on March 21, 2020.

In Canada, the series premiered on YTV on October 8, 2014. In Australia and New Zealand, the series began airing on Nickelodeon on January 17, 2015. In the United Kingdom and Ireland, the series premiered on Nickelodeon on February 13, 2015. In Spain, the series premiered on Nickelodeon in 2015, and is also broadcast on TVE's Clan.

== Reception ==
=== Critical ===
Emily Ashby of Common Sense Media rated the series a 2 out of 5 stars, writing, "cheesy, formulaic superhero comedy offers little substance." Patrick Kevin Day of the Los Angeles Times states, "in an age when the show's prime audience is rushing out to see the much hipper Marvel movies in droves, Captain Man and his retro hideout feel like the wish fulfillment of a previous generation."

=== Ratings ===
Viewership and ratings per season of Henry Danger
Season	Episodes	First aired		Last aired		Avg. viewers (millions)
Season	Episodes	Date	Viewers (millions)	Date	Viewers (millions)	Avg. viewers (millions)
1	25	July 26, 2014	1.94	May 16, 2015	1.55	1.75
2	18	September 12, 2015	2.13	July 17, 2016	2.60	1.80
3	19	September 17, 2016	1.82	October 7, 2017	1.65	1.91
4	20	October 21, 2017	1.41	October 20, 2018	0.94	1.25
5	39	November 3, 2018	1.11	March 21, 2020	1.26	0.97

=== Awards and nominations ===
Year	Award	Category	Result	Ref.
2015	Kids' Choice Awards	Favorite TV Show	Nominated	
2016	Kids' Choice Awards	Favorite TV Show	Nominated	
2017	Kids' Choice Awards	Favorite TV Show – Kids' Show	Won	
2018	Muahs Awards	Children and Teen Programming: Best Makeup	Won	
2018	Muahs Awards	Children and Teen Programming: Best Hair Styling	Won	
2018	Kids' Choice Awards	Favorite TV Show	Nominated	
2019	Kids' Choice Awards	Favorite Funny TV Show	Nominated	
2020	Kids' Choice Awards	Favorite Kids' TV Show	Won	
2020	Primetime Emmy Awards	Outstanding Stunt Coordination for a Comedy Series or Variety Program	Nominated	
2021	Kids' Choice Awards	Favorite Kids' TV Show	Nominated	

== Spinoffs ==
Henry Danger had several spinoffs, commonly referred to collectively as the "Dangerverse".

=== The Adventures of Kid Danger ===
On March 2, 2017, Nickelodeon announced that a new animated series, under the working title of The Adventures of Kid Danger and Captain Man, was in development with 10 episodes announced. The Adventures of Kid Danger premiered on January 15, 2018, and concluded on June 14, 2018.

=== Film ===
In May 2017, the president of Viacom's Nickelodeon group announced that a film based on the series was being developed. In January 2022, it was announced that Jace Norman would reprise the title role, and also serve as executive producer of a Henry Danger film set to be released on Paramount+. The film premiered on Nickelodeon and Paramount+ simultaneously on January 17, 2025.

=== Danger Force ===
On February 19, 2020, it was announced that Henry Danger would be receiving a spinoff titled Danger Force which premiered on March 28, 2020, and concluded on February 21, 2024. The series was created by Christopher J. Nowak and stars Cooper Barnes and Michael D. Cohen, reprising their roles from Henry Danger, with four new superheroes-in-training joining the team.
