= List of School of Rock episodes =

School of Rock is an American musical-comedy television series developed by Jim Armogida and Steve Armogida that premiered on Nickelodeon on March 12, 2016. It ran for three seasons, with its final episode airing on April 8, 2018. The series is based on the 2003 film of the same name and stars Breanna Yde, Ricardo Hurtado, Jade Pettyjohn, Lance Lim, Aidan Miner, Tony Cavalero, and Jama Williamson.

== Series overview ==
Season	Episodes	Originally released	
Season	Episodes	First released	Last released
1	12	March 12, 2016	June 18, 2016
2	13	September 17, 2016	January 28, 2017
3	20	July 8, 2017	April 8, 2018

== Episodes ==
=== Season 1 (2016) ===
No. overall	No. in season	Title	Directed by	Written by	Original release date	Prod. code	U.S. viewers (millions)
1	1	"Come Together"	Jonathan Judge	Teleplay by : Jim Armogida & Steve Armogida and Mike White; Story by : Mike White	March 12, 2016	112	2.38
Dewey Finn, a rock musician, becomes the new substitute teacher for a class when their teacher, Mrs. Calpakis, was taken to rest indefinitely due to falling from a skateboard. The students quickly discover that he's not a real teacher. Mr. Finn then discovers that the students are very talented with music and has an idea to have them play rock music to learn. The students like it at first, but they're afraid that Principal Mullins will catch them so they come up with a plan to be a secret band. Mr. Finn thinks that he's not qualified to be a teacher and decides to quit, but the students convince him to come back and start a secret band which he agrees to. Guest stars: Jama Williamson (Principal Mullins), Vernèe Watson
2	2	"Cover Me"	Jonathan Judge	Gigi McCreery & Perry Rein	March 19, 2016	102	1.68
The band needs a singer to be able to compete in "Battle of the Bands", so Summer decides to do it so that Freddie will notice her. The problem is that she can't sing, so Tomika teaches her but still isn't able to get it right. Tomika helps Summer by having her lip synch and Tomika will do the actual singing. The class realizes that Summer can't sing and that Tomika can. The class tries to convince Tomika to be the singer but she rejects the idea. Summer then tries to convince Tomika to be the singer and finally Tomika agrees. Special guest star: Pete Wentz
3	3	"Video Killed the Speed Debate Star"	Bruce Leddy	Jeremy Hall	March 26, 2016	104	1.63
In an effort to provide warnings whenever Principal Mullins comes to the class, Lawrence inadvertently suggests putting a camera on the class, which disables the band's ability to practice. Meanwhile, Mr. Finn helps Summer for the speed debate contest through rapping. As Mr. Finn and Lawrence install a loop video of him teaching on Mullins' office computer, Summer buys them time by slowing down the debate, but goes rapping when they are finished, which makes her win the speed debate. The next day, Principal Mullins asks Lawrence to uninstall the camera due to a video of her dancing in the hallway getting leaked. Guest star: Jama Williamson
4	4	"The Story of Us (But More About Me)"	Bruce Leddy	Eric Friedman	April 2, 2016	103	1.42
Guest star: Jama Williamson
5	5	"We're Not Gonna Take It"	Trevor Kirschner	Laurie Parres	April 9, 2016	105	1.47
When Zack's father catches him playing rock on the electric guitar when he is supposed to be playing classical music on the classic guitar, he moves Zack to another class, convinced that Mr. Finn is a bad influence on Zack. The class that Zack is moved to is very boring and Mr. Finn, Tomika, Lawrence and the gang must work together to get Zack back. They devise a plan: every time Mr. Finn comes with a distraction for Zack's new teacher, Zack jumps out of the class window to escape for band practice and Freddy and Lawrence catch him. However, Principal Mullins catches Zack when Freddy and Lawrence run away when spotting her, leaving a clueless Zack to jump out right in front of Principal Mullins. Zack's father is called to the school and talks to Principal Mullins, Mr. Finn and Zack. After discovering that Mr. Finn has been able to influence Zack to be able to express his opinion by himself like Zack's father has never done, Zack's father agrees to let Zack return to Mr. Finn's class. The episode ends with Zack returned to Mr. Finn's class and the band being able to continue holding practices, ensuring the continuation of the band. Guest stars: Jama Williamson, James Kyson, Matt Champagne
6	6	"A Band with No Name"	Michael Shea	Kevin Jakubowski	April 16, 2016	106	1.42
As the band gets their first gig on the birthday party of a seven-year-old girl, they are faced with a challenge: they have to choose a band name or else they will end up with a princess band name. Mr. Finn suggests "Paradoxx", but nobody seems to like that idea. After a lot of arguing over the name, the band splits up to two parts, "Summer and the Timewarps" and "Smog Check". Mr. Finn gets them back together by lying to both of them that only they will be performing at the birthday party. The girl notices that the band split up and makes the princess she hired as a backup perform a song instead, but after some time, the band stops fighting and they sing a rock version of the princess' song, and everyone likes it. They end up with the name "School of Rock". Guest stars: Kira Kosarin, Tom Wilson, Ashlyn Faith Williams
7	7	"We Can Be Heroes, Sort Of"	Savage Steve Holland	Jay Kogen	April 23, 2016	108	1.25
Tomika becomes shy after her brothers post some videos of her making silly faces while practicing at home. Mr. Finn helps her overcome her fear by suggesting her to take inspiration from her idol, who is Demi Lovato. Mr. Finn lies that he knows Lovato, who is in town for the week, but he fails to find her in the hotel because she used a fake name. Meanwhile, Tomika dresses up like Lovato, but she ends up pushing the band too hard by trying to match Lovato's band too closely. Tomika apologizes to the band for pushing them too hard, and after some rehearsals they have done earlier, they end up performing Lovato's song "Heart Attack" by being themselves rather than trying to copy her band. As Mr. Finn enters the classroom dressed up like Lovato, the students immediately recognize him and he says he was unable to find her. To everyone's surprise, Lawrence says he met Lovato in the hotel, and everyone gets tickets to her show that night. Guest stars: Jama Williamson, Iqbal Theba
8	8	"Should I Stay or Should I Go?"	Sean Lambert	Gigi McCreery & Perry Rein	April 30, 2016	107	1.41
Guest stars: Kendall Schmidt, Sam Horrigan
9	9	"Money (That's What I Want)"	Trevor Kirschner	Gigi McCreery & Perry Rein	May 7, 2016	110	1.11
Guest stars: Jama Williamson, Shaun Brown
10	10	"Freddy Fights for His Right to Party"	Jay Kogen	Jeremy Hall	June 4, 2016	109	1.40
Guest star: Lucas Adams
11	11	"(Really Really) Old Time Rock and Roll"	Jonathan Judge	Eric Friedman	June 11, 2016	111	1.29
Guest stars: Jama Williamson, Haley Powell, Shanti Lowry, Aaron Hendry
12	12	"We Are the Champions... Maybe"	Trevor Kirschner	Jay Kogen	June 18, 2016	113	1.39
The band rehearse their song for Battle of the Bands, unaware that Justin and The Night Lizards is spying on them. The band sneak out of the school to go the competition, outsmarting a suspicious Clark. However, they face some troubles on their way. When they arrived wet, they are denied entry, so they decide to put some pajamas (as there was only a pajama store open nearby). Things got worse when they discover that their song is being performed by the Lizards. As they begin to lose hope, they rehearse "Shut Up and Dance" on the rooftop, where the Lizards lock them up. To cheer up the kids, Mr. Finn encourages them to perform for themselves. The judges overhear their performance and go upstairs, where School of Rock is crowned winner, much to the dismay of Justin. As everyone is upstairs, Clark fails to show Principal Mullins that the students snuck out. Special guest star: Pete Wentz Guest stars: Jama Williamson, Kendall Schmidt, Sam Horrigan

=== Season 2 (2016–17) ===
No. overall	No. in season	Title	Directed by	Written by	Original release date	Prod. code	U.S. viewers (millions)
13	1	"Changes"	Trevor Kirschner	Jim Armogida & Steve Armogida	September 17, 2016	201	1.34
After their victory at Battle of the Bands, they still have to keep their band a secret. Unexpectedly, Mrs. Calpakis returns and Mr. Finn was released from duty. The class gets bored by Mrs. Calpakis' strict guide-ridden teaching style. Then they realize they would rather have Mr. Finn as their teacher and they plan to get Mr. Finn back. Principal Mullins agrees to rehire Mr. Finn as a regular teacher for kindergarteners, where he gets tortured by them. When the kids discovers that Mrs. Calpakis could discipline the kindergarteners more, Summer made a deal with them to exchange their respective teachers. Mr. Finn finally becomes their regular and permanent teacher. Guest star: Vernee Watson
14	2	"Wouldn't It Be Nice?"	Trevor Kirschner	Jay Kogen	September 24, 2016	202	1.33
Guest stars: Brec Bassinger (Kale), Haley Powell, David Pressman
15	3	"With or Without You"	Jody Margolin Hahn	Sarah Jane Cunningham & Suzie V. Freeman	October 1, 2016	203	0.96
Guest stars: Brec Bassinger, David Pressman, Meyrick Murphy Absent: Jama Williamson as Principal Mullins
16	4	"Brilliant Disguise"	Trevor Kirschner	Steve Skrovan	October 8, 2016	204	1.32
As Freddy and Kale become closer friends, Summer becomes jealous because of Freddy's relationship with Kale. The band performs in disguise at the school dance, so their identities are not known and remain secret. As they wearing helmets as part of the performance, Summer decides to reveal her feelings to Freddy. Unfortunately, it is not Freddy who is at drums at that time, but the janitor who works at school, and Freddy ends up dancing with Kale which is found out by Summer. After all, the drums are being played by Lawrence's drum machine. Guest stars: Brec Bassinger, Ivan Mallon
17	5	"I Put a Spell on You"	Jonathan Judge	Lindsay Golder	October 15, 2016	208	1.58
Future Superstars, a singing competition and Summer and Tomika’s favourite show comes to town. Summer wants to audition with Tomika, but Tomika wants to audition alone, fearing that Summer would embarrass herself. Summer has Mr Finn hypnotise her to sing beautifully so she can audition with Tomika without embarrassment. Summer performs Hide Away in front of the whole class, much to their amazement. After the performance, Summer finds out that Tomika only wanted to audition alone because she is afraid that Summer would embarrass her, they have a fight and they storm out of the classroom. Later, at the audition, they reconcile with help from Mr Finn and they decide to audition together. However, after the judges repeatedly say the trigger word for Summer’s singing, Summer sings horribly again. Summer tries to let Tomika audition alone, but Tomika says that no matter what, they were best friends and would audition together. Later, it is revealed that their audition was so terrible it made the episode where they showed the failed auditions. Guest stars: Daya, Ivan Mallon
18	6	"Welcome to My Nightmare"	Trevor Kirschner	Alison Flierl & Scott Chernoff	October 22, 2016	210	1.50
As Halloween approaches, the students inform Mr. Finn that Principal Mullins has banned Halloween and changed it to a harvest festival. With Principal Mullins sick, the school holds a Halloween party, where Vice Principal Sternhagen offers a pizza party for the scariest class. The band competes with Clark's class by building a haunted house, where it almost fails when a drunken by meds Principal Mullins returns to school. When she's aware of what's going on, Freddy pretends to be the schoolboard head to praise the Halloween celebration, making Principal Mullins officially disband her restriction towards Halloween. Guest stars: Ivan Mallon, Elisha Henig, Haley Powell, David Pressman
19	7	"Truckin' "	Trevor Kirschner	Jeremy Hall	November 5, 2016	209	1.22
When the cafeteria gets closed due to a rat invading it, Zack brings a food truck to sell his "Meal Shakes". It is a success until Justin from the Night Lizards comes to the school and brings his own food truck and sells sticked food called "Stick It to Ya!" in revenge for School of Rock's victory in Battle of the Bands. The food trucks compete as the Principal only allows one to operate, and Stick It to Ya! quickly outshines Meal Shakes. Zack gets angry when the rest of his band mates eat Stick It to Ya!. They make it up by helping Zack improve his truck and promoting it better, which beats Stick It to Ya's popularity and forces Justin to leave the school in disgrace. Mr. Finn is assigned to catch the rat, but is so frightened. He overcomes his fear when the rat is willing to go to the cage and in return he secretly keeps him in his teacher desk. Guest stars: Kendall Schmidt, Ivan Mallon, Will Kindrachuk
20	8	"Voices Carry"	Eric Dean Seaton	Jeremy Hall	November 12, 2016	207	1.42
Guest stars: Brec Bassinger, Ivan Mallon, Augie Isaac
21	9	"Is She Really Going Out with Him?"	Jonathan Judge	Harry Hannigan	November 19, 2016	206	1.70
Summer is very jealous of Freddy’s relationship with Kale. After a few failed tries to get Freddy’s attention, she almost gives up when Kale asks her what to give Freddy for their one-month anniversary. Summer attempts to sabotage their relationship by telling Kale to give Freddy a hat, which he will hate. She plans to swoop in with the perfect gift for Freddy after he unwraps Kale’s gift. Tomika tries to stop Summer from doing it, but to no avail. At the last moment, Summer decides against it and quickly swaps Kale’s gift for her own. Although Kale and Freddy are still together, she is satisfied she did the right thing. Tomika tells Summer that she is proud of her. Guest stars: Brec Bassinger, Ivan Mallon
22	10	"Total Eclipse of the Heart"	Jay Kogen	Corinne Marshall	January 7, 2017	211	1.29
Guest stars: Brec Bassinger, Ivan Mallon, Will Kindrachuk Absent: Jama Williamson as Principal Mullins
23	11	"Takin' Care of Business"	Jonathan Judge	Scott Chernoff & Alison Flierl	January 14, 2017	205	1.56
Absent: Jama Williamson as Principal Mullins
24	12	"Don't Let Me Be Misunderstood"	Trevor Kirschner	Jay Kogen	January 21, 2017	212	1.23
Guest stars: Haley Powell, Devion Harris
25	13	"Don't Stop Believin' "	Jonathan Judge	Steve Armogida & Jim Armogida	January 28, 2017	213	1.18
Special guest star: Ryan Tedder Guest stars: Brec Bassinger, Will Kindrachuk, Ivan Mallon, Haley Powell, Johnathan McClain, Cleo Berry

=== Season 3 (2017–18) ===
No. overall	No. in season	Title	Directed by	Written by	Original release date	Prod. code	U.S. viewers (millions)
26	1	"Hold On Loosely"	Jonathan Judge	Jim Armogida & Steve Armogida	July 8, 2017	301	1.03
Guest stars: Ivan Mallon, Augie Isaac, Tamara Mello, Christopher Darga
27	2	"Do You Want to Know a Secret?"	Eric Dean Seaton	Suzie V. Freeman & Sarah Jane Cunningham	July 15, 2017	302	0.91
Guest stars: Brec Bassinger, Will Kindrachuk
28	3	"True Colors"	Victor Gonzalez	Steve Skrovan	July 22, 2017	303	1.14
Guest stars: Ivan Mallon, Augie Isaac
29	4	"Leader of the Band"	Trevor Kirschner	Jeremy Hall	July 29, 2017	305	0.89
Guest stars: Brec Bassinger, David Anthony Higgins Absent: Jama Williamson as Principal Mullins
30	5	"The Other Side of Summer"	Victor Gonzalez	Jay Kogen	August 5, 2017	307	1.32
Guest stars: Miriam Flynn, David Pressman
31	6	"Minimum Wage"	Jay Kogen	Clay Lapari	August 12, 2017	309	1.00
Guest stars: JoJo Siwa, Chelsea Ricketts, Jason Michael Snow Absent: Jama Williamson as Principal Mullins
32	7	"Heroes & Villains"	Trevor Kirschner	Harry Hannigan	November 18, 2017	304	1.06
Guest stars: Ivan Mallon, Will Kindrachuk
33	8	"Jingle Bell Rock"	Jonathan Judge	Suzie V. Freeman & Sarah Jane Cunningham	December 3, 2017	315	0.85
Guest stars: Brec Bassinger, Ivan Mallon, Augie Isaac
34	9	"Kool Thing"	Victor Gonzalez	Sarah Jane Cunningham & Suzie V. Freeman	January 7, 2018	311	0.60
Guest stars: Hey Violet, Haley B. Powell, Shelby Simmons, Marianne Muellerleile, Michael Marc Friedman Absent: Jama Williamson as Principal Mullins
35	10	"Would I Lie to You?"	Katy Garretson	Alison Flierl & Scott Chernoff	January 14, 2018	308	0.61
Guest star: David Pressman
36	11	"Puppy Love"	Katy Garretson	Scott Chernoff & Alison Flierl	January 21, 2018	306	0.54
Guest stars: Brec Bassinger, Ivan Mallon, Haley B. Powell, Cole Jensen, Bentley Green
37	12	"Love Is a Battlefield"	Trevor Kirschner	Harry Hannigan	January 28, 2018	312	0.53
Guest stars: Ivan Mallon, Will Kindrachuk, Augie Isaac
38	13	"A Matter of Trust"	Katy Garretson	Steve Skrovan	February 11, 2018	310	0.73
On a stormy day, Tomika is playing in a puddle inside the school and encourages Summer to do the same; however, when Summer tries, she slips and falls into a bucket. A stranger offers to help Summer out of the bucket, but when she looks up, she discovers it is Justin from Night Lizard, who claims they have been repeatedly failing to get a gig. Still upset about the trouble he has previously caused, Tomika is quick to not trust him, despite him apologizing. Meanwhile, Freddy, Zack, and Lawrence pull a prank on Mr. Finn involving an oatmeal cannon. Upset that this happened, he wants nothing more to do with pranks, but when Zack says that they also wanted to pull the prank on Summer, he suddenly changes his mind. When Tomika and Summer walk in, Mr. Finn desperately tries to get the prank to succeed. However, when Summer sits at her desk and takes out a pencil, nothing happens. Mr. Finn then becomes upset and looks into the desk's cubby, only to be shot with oatmeal again. Later, Zack and Lawrence find and start reading Summer's diary. At first, Freddy disapproves of this; however, when he hears that it is about what to find in a perfect man, he quickly changes his tune. Meanwhile, Tomika and Summer are in the classroom when Justin walks in, whom Tomika still does not trust. When Justin hears about how smart of a manager Summer is for School of Rock, he suggests that she manages Night Lizard. Summer wants to help, but Tomika does not believe a single word. Later, the group discovers that they were not chosen to perform in Battle of the Bands, which upsets Tomika. Wanting to see who stole their gig, Tomika later brings the group to Battle of the Bands. She then discovers that the band who stole their gig was none other than Night Lizard and that Summer agreed to be their new manager. The next day when Mr. Finn calls a band meeting, Tomika states that Summer is no longer School of Rock's manager, which upsets Summer, who was just trying to help someone, causing her to leave. In the hallway, Summer tells Justin that she is no longer part of School of Rock. Justin then casually enters the classroom to check up on the others and is very sarcastic about the situation on the way out. Later, the others discuss about firing Summer, which pleases Justin. Mr. Finn then states that School of Rock is officially broken up, which further pleases Justin, who has been listening outside. Mr. Finn then opens the door and Justin falls on the floor. Tomika then confronts Justin and insists it is his fault, which at first he sarcastically denies, but then admits it was him. When Tomika threatens to tell Summer, Justin tells her he will just deny it and that Summer will believe him because she is a softy. Unfortunately for him, Summer has been in the cabinet listening to everything. Later, Freddy, dressed as the "perfect man", runs into Summer's grandmother, where he discovers that the diary belongs to her and that she just lent it to Summer for her creative writing class. Guest stars: Kendall Schmidt, Mindy Sterling Absent: Jama Williamson as Principal Mullins
39	14	"Don't Know What You Got ('Til It's Gone)"	Tony Cavalero	Shawn Simmons	February 18, 2018	314	0.61
Guest stars: Ivan Mallon, Max Jimenez, Haley B. Powell
40	15	"Not Afraid"	Steve Armogida	Jeremy Hall	February 25, 2018	319	0.60
Guest stars: Brec Bassinger, JoJo Siwa, Lilimar, Haley B. Powell, Greg Romero Wilson, Sean Whalen Absent: Jama Williamson as Principal Mullins
41	16	"Surprise, Surprise"	Jay Kogen	Jeremy Hall	March 4, 2018	313	0.72
Guest stars: Ivan Mallon, Will Kindrachuk
42	17	"We Gotta Get Out of This Place"	Jonathan Judge	Shawn Simmons	March 11, 2018	316	0.70
Guest stars: Kelly Perine, Ivan Mallon, Annie Cavalero, Kevin Berntson
43	18	"Photograph"	Jim Armogida	Jay Kogen	March 18, 2018	320	0.65
Guest stars: Ivan Mallon, Haley B. Powell, Saylor Bell, Roni Akurati
44	19	"I Love Rock and Roll: Part I"	Trevor Kirschner	Steve Armogida & Jim Armogida	April 1, 2018	317	0.45
Special guest stars: Pete Wentz, Pat Monahan Guest stars: Jack Griffo, Ivan Mallon, Augie Isaac, Alexander Neher
45	20	"I Love Rock and Roll: Part II"	Trevor Kirschner	Steve Armogida & Jim Armogida	April 8, 2018	318	0.67
Guest stars: Jack Griffo, Ivan Mallon, Augie Isaac, Alexander Neher
