= Ricardo Hurtado =

American actor (born 1999)

- Born: Ricardo Javier Hurtado; August 22, 1999 (age 26); Miami, Florida, U.S.
- Occupation: Actor
- Years active: 2016–present
- Website: officialricardo.com

Ricardo Javier Hurtado (born August 22, 1999) is an American actor. He is known for his role as Freddy on the 2016 Nickelodeon television series School of Rock and his voice over role as High Five on the 2020 Netflix TV series Glitch Techs.

== Early life ==
Hurtado was born in Miami, to musician Ricardo Hurtado and Ofelia Ramírez, both from Nicaragua. When he was a year old, he moved to Atlanta with his parents.

== Career ==
Hurtado began his acting career in 2016, when he made his feature film debut in the Nickelodeon film Ultimate Halloween Haunted House. He was cast to play the main role in the musical-comedy series School of Rock opposite Breanna Yde, Jade Pettyjohn, Lance Lim and Aidan Miner, which aired from 2016 to 2018, he was nominated for Best Young Actor - Television in 2017 Imagen Awards and also was nominated for Best Young Ensemble - Television Series in 2018 Young Entertainer Awards. Hurtado appeared in a guest roles in the period sitcom series The Goldbergs.

Hurtado was cast to play the lead role of Tyler Gossard in the comedy action-adventure series Malibu Rescue alongside Jackie R. Jacobson, Abby Donnelly, Alkoya Brunson and Breanna Yde. He reprised his role in the television sequels, Malibu Rescue – The Movie and Malibu Rescue: The Next Wave. The series premiered in May 2019 on Netflix. He then played a guest role in the animated miniseries Middle School Moguls, in which he played the voice role of Finn / Fred.

In 2020, Hurtado was cast to play the lead voice role in the comedy animated series Glitch Techs, in which he played the voice role of Hector "High Five" Nieves/Hi-5, which was premiered on Netflix on February 21, 2020, with a second season premiering on August 17 of the same year.

In 2021, Hurtado starred in the Netflix musical comedy-drama television miniseries Country Comfort with Katharine McPhee, Eddie Cibrian, Jamie Martin Mann, Griffin McIntyre, Shiloh Verrico and Pyper Braun. Also in 2021, Hurtado played the voice of Rich Belcher in the animated satirical science fiction comedy film Ron's Gone Wrong.

In 2022, Hurtado appeared in the romantic drama movie Along for the Ride, based on the novel of the same name by Sarah Dessen, which was released on May 6, 2022 by Netflix.

In 2023, Hurtado starred alongside Gattlin Griffith and Giselle Torres in the drama film What Rhymes with Reason, which was released on October 10, 2023.

== Personal life ==
In November 2020, he announced his engagement to his girlfriend, ZuZu Holland.

== Filmography ==
=== Film ===
Year	Title	Role	Notes
2019	Malibu Rescue	Tyler Gossard	
2020	Malibu Rescue: The Next Wave	Tyler Gossard	
2021	Ron's Gone Wrong	Rich Belcher (voice)	
2022	Along for the Ride	Jake	
2023	Ruby Gillman, Teenage Kraken	Student #1 and Student #10 (voices)	
2023	What Rhymes with Reason	Billy Brandt	
TBA	The Lies I Tell Myself †	Elliot	Completed
TBA	Man Imperfect †	Teddy Miller	Post-production

=== Television ===
Year	Title	Role	Notes
2016	Ultimate Halloween Haunted House	Party City Accomplice	Television film
2016–2018	School of Rock	Freddy Huerta	45 episodes
2017	Nicky, Ricky, Dicky & Dawn	Joey Montagelli	Episode: "Not-So-Sweet Charity"
2017	Nickelodeon's Sizzling Summer Camp Special	Succotash Pete	Television film
2018	The Mick	Nico	Episode: "The Graduate"
2018	Glimpse	Malcom Reyes	Episode: "Analog Boy"
2018	Prince of Peoria	Rafael	Episode: "The Bro-Posal"
2018–2019	The Goldbergs	Brian McMahon	2 episodes
2019	Speechless	Connor	Episode: "J-I-- JIMMY V-A-L-VALENTINE"
2019	Malibu Rescue: The Series	Tyler Gossard	8 episodes
2019	Bunk'd	Austin Justin	Episode: "Water Under the Dock"
2019	Middle School Moguls	Finn / Fred (voice)	4 episodes
2020	Glitch Techs	Hector "High Five" Nieves/Hi-5 (voice)	19 episodes
2020	It's Pony	Blake (voice)	Episode: "Fan Pony/Cop Mom"
2021	Country Comfort	Tuck	10 episodes
2023	The Really Loud House	Chase	Episode: "The Guy Who Makes You Fly"
