= Losing Louis =

Play written by Simon Mendes da Costa

Losing Louis a play by Simon Mendes da Costa, is a black comedy which first premiered at the Hampstead Theatre, London, on 24 January 2005. It was produced by Michael Codron and starred Alison Steadman and Lynda Bellingham and was directed by Robin Lefevre. Following Hampstead Theatre it transferred immediately to the West End before embarking on a No 1. Southern tour the following year. It also opened on Broadway at the Biltmore Theatre on 12 October 2006, in a different production called Losing Louie, directed by Jerry Zaks.

Secrets that refuse to remain buried erupt as family members are brought together, after years of segregation to face it all out in the bedroom – the place where all the confusion began. (Taken from the original promotion leaflet)

== Characters ==
The 1950s

Louis Judah Ellis, A married man,
Bobbie Ellis, His wife,
Bella Holland, his mistress.

Present Day

Tony Ellis, Louis's eldest son,
Reggie Ellis, Louis's youngest son,
Shelia Ellis, Tony's wife,
Elizabeth Ellis, Reggie's wife.

== Notable productions ==
Role	The Original Cast, Hampstead Theatre and Trafalgar Studios (January – June 2005)	The UK Tour, March 2006	The Australian Premiere – Ensemble Theatre, June 2006.	Broadway premiere – Biltmore Theatre – October – November 2006
Shelia	Alison Steadman	Alison Steadman	Amanda Muggleton	Michele Pawk
Elizabeth	Lynda Bellingham	Rula Lenska	Linden Wilkinson	Patricia Kalember
Tony	David Horovich	David Horovich	George Spartels	Mark Linn-Baker
Reggie	Brian Protheroe	David Cardy	Andrew McFarlane	Matthew Arkin
Louis	Jason Durr	Ben Porter	Christopher Tomkinson	Scott Cohen
Bobbie	Emma Cunniffe	Sue Appleby	Amanda Bishop	Rebecca Creskoff
Bella	Anita Briem	Hannah Watkins	Octavia Barron-Martin	Jama Williamson
Director	Robin Lefevre	Robin Lefevre	Andrew Doyle	Jerry Zaks
