= Tegan West =

American actor and writer

- Born: April 26, 1959; California, U.S.

Tegan West (born on April 26, 1959 in California, USA) is an American actor and writer who worked in television, stage and film.

== Career ==
His film roles include Grace of My Heart, Sleep with Me, Spontaneous Combustion, Jaws 2, and Hamburger Hill.

He portrayed a colleague of Norm's on Cheers who tried to steal his idea in "Norm's First Hurrah" in Season 5 while almost ten years later on the spin-off, Frasier, he portrayed a similar character called Jack who tried to rip Frasier off in Season 3's "Frasier Grinch".

Other television credits include Wonder Woman, Everwood, The X-Files, The West Wing, and Law & Order.

Tegan is also a screenwriter. He co-wrote the movie The Cave (2005), and he and Scott Atkinson, had been writing partners. They wrote Duck Duck Goose, and had also written a movie called "Honeymoon with Dad" to be directed by Danny DeVito, had another script optioned called "Minimum Wage" to be helmed by Mark Waters, and planned another project about Irish senator David Norris. All these planned projects received media attention and announcements in the industry.
