= Michael Codron =

British theatre producer (born 1930)

Sir Michael Codron CBE
- Born: Michael Victor Codron; 8 June 1930 (age 96); London, England
- Education: Worcester College, Oxford, South East England
- Occupations: film and theatre producer
- Known for: Works by Harold Pinter, Christopher Hampton, David Hare, Simon Gray and Tom Stoppard
- Awards: Tony, Drama Desk, Evening Standard, and Laurence Olivier Awards

Sir Michael Victor Codron CBE (born 8 June 1930) is a British theatre producer, known for his productions of the early work of Harold Pinter, Christopher Hampton, David Hare, Simon Gray and Tom Stoppard. He has been honoured with a Laurence Olivier Award for Lifetime Achievement, and is a stakeholder and director of the Aldwych Theatre in the West End, London.

== Early life ==
Codron was born in London, and studied at Worcester College, Oxford.

== Career ==
=== The Birthday Party ===
According to the American scholar and critic, John Nathan, Codron is possibly "most famous for the risk he took on a then virtually unknown playwright called Harold Pinter, who had a play called The Birthday Party. Codron has said that it was his Jewishness that helped him recognise the play's and Pinter's worth."

The Birthday Party had its première at the Arts Theatre, in Cambridge, England, on 28 April 1958, where the play was "warmly received" on its pre-London tour, in Oxford and Wolverhampton, where it also met with a "positive reception" as "the most enthralling experience the Grand Theatre has given us in many months."

On 19 May 1958, the production moved to the Lyric Opera House, Hammersmith (now the Lyric Hammersmith), for its début in London, where it was a commercial and mostly critical failure, instigating "bewildered hysteria" and closing after only eight performances. The weekend after it had already closed, Harold Hobson's belated rave review, "The Screw Turns Again", appeared in The Sunday Times, rescuing its critical reputation and enabling it to become one of the classics of the modern stage.

=== Subsequent career ===
His career of producing Broadway productions began in April 1963, when he staged a short run of Charles Dyer's Rattle of a Simple Man. Codron followed this with Poor Bitos (1964). He also produced Joe Orton's first play Entertaining Mr. Sloane (1964) at the New Arts Theatre in London. Nat Cohen invested in many of his productions.

Codron's revival of The Clandestine Marriage left critics confused, as many thought the title was "The Candelstein Marriage". In the 1960s, Codron produced several controversial works, including Joe Orton's Loot and Frank Marcus's The Killing of Sister George.

For his next project, Codron took a more comedic turn with Christopher Hampton's The Philanthropist, running at the Royal Court and Mayfair Theatres in London. It premiered on Broadway at the Ethel Barrymore Theatre on 15 May 1971, garnering Codron a Tony Award nomination for Best Play. David Merrick became lead producer for the Broadway transfer, with Codron gaining a "Produced in association with" credit.

=== Butley and The Norman Conquests ===
Codron next staged the original London production of Simon Gray's Butley. It was first performed at the Criterion Theatre in London beginning on 14 July 1971, produced by Codron and directed by Harold Pinter, with Alan Bates as Ben Butley. Codron re-staged the show in 1972 in a Broadway production directed by James Hammerstein at the Morosco Theatre, where it ran for 14 previews and 135 performances, being nominated for the Tony for Best Play. Bates won the Evening Standard Theatre Award and Tony Award for Best Actor in a Play for his performances on the West End and Broadway, respectively. The play was later adapted into a 1974 film of the same name, which also starred Bates in the title role.

The producer looked to Broadway for his next venture, The Norman Conquests, a trilogy of plays written by Alan Ayckbourn in 1973. Each of the plays depicts the same six characters over the same weekend in a different part of a house. Table Manners is set in the dining room, Living Together in the living room, and Round and Round the Garden in the garden. The plays originally premiered in Scarborough, before playing the Globe and Apollo Theatres from 1974 until 1976. It opened on Broadway on 7 December 1975 for 69 performances at the Morosco Theatre, directed by Eric Thompson and featuring Richard Benjamin, Ken Howard, Barry Nelson, Estelle Parsons, Paula Prentiss, and Carole Shelley. For this, Codron received three Drama Desk Awards.

=== Good Fun ===
In 1980, he produced Victoria Wood's play, Good Fun. Wood, keen to trade on her previous stage success Talent, was commissioned to write another play by Codron. According to Wood, "I wrote one called Pals, which he said was 'very enjoyable'. This is a euphemism for wincing, so it went in the bin. I then wrote another called Good Fun." The play premiered in April 1980 at Sheffield's Crucible Theatre. It was directed by David Leland.

After The Crucible's second version, the plan was to transfer the play to the West End. Though this never happened, it was performed at the King's Head Theatre in Islington. Wood said she heard a man at the interval saying, "It's a bit witty witty isn't it?" Wood's view of the play was this: "[T]here was an awful lot wrong with it but there were some lovely performances and the audiences enjoyed it."

After Good Fun Wood concentrated on television comedy and her career as a stand up comic. Though she did write two more plays, "which to save bothering Michael Codron, I called 'very enjoyable' and put straight in the bin."

=== Later career ===
In the latter half of his career, Codron mainly focused on transferring shows he produced in England to New York City, and in the process won several awards. Among them were Otherwise Engaged (1977 Tony nomination), Night and Day (1980 Drama Desk nomination), The Dresser (1982 Tony nomination), Noises Off (1984 Tony nomination), The Real Thing (1984 Tony and Drama Desk Awards), Benefactors (1986 Tony and Drama Desk nominations), and Copenhagen (2000 Tony and Drama Desk Awards). He also produced Patrick Marber's Dealer's Choice (1995) in the West End.

In 2003/2004, Codron presented a production of Michael Frayn's Democracy at the National Theatre. Following this, he produced the play at the Wyndham's Theatre in the West End, from 15 April 2004 to 9 October 2004, with Michael Blakemore as director.

Codron's next project, in association with the Manhattan Theatre Club, was the play Losing Louis, which he produced in the West End at the Hampstead Theatre (and later Trafalgar Studios) in January 2006, before opening on Broadway at the Biltmore Theatre in September 2006. It was directed by Jerry Zaks and written by Simon Mendes da Costa.

At the 2010 Laurence Olivier Awards ceremony, held on 21 March 2010 at the Grosvenor House Hotel, Codron was the recipient of the award for Outstanding Achievement, for being "one of the West End's most influential producers" and "discovering Harold Pinter."

Codron was knighted in the 2014 New Year Honours for services to the theatre.

== Current and past positions ==
From 1983 to 1996, Codron and partner David Sutton owned the Vaudeville Theatre in Westminster, London. He is an Esquire and was appointed to the Order of the British Empire in August 1989. From 1992 to 1993, Codron was a Cameron Mackintosh Professor of Contemporary Theatre at Oxford University.

He currently serves on the board of trustees for Oxford School of Drama, and on the Oxford University Dramatic Society, funding productions in Oxford, England. Codron served as the director of the Hampstead Theatre and Theatre Mutual Insurance Co., and currently runs the Aldwych Theatre in the West End theatre district.

== Filmography ==
He produced the film Clockwise (1986) and was the Associate Producer for Re:Joyce! – A Celebration of the Work of Joyce Grenfell in 1991.

== Personal life ==
His parents were Isaac "Haco" Codron and Lily Morgenstern, who regularly attended out-of-town tryouts of Codron's plays in Brighton. "They became part of the dreaded Brighton opinion that we all used to worry about", says Codron. "They would go every week to see a play at the Theatre Royal and ring me the following day with their views. My father always thought the plays were too far-fetched."

In his autobiography, Putting it On: The West End Theatre of Michael Codron (Duckworth, 2010), written with help from Alan Strachan, Codron confirmed that he is homosexual. For twenty-five years, his partner was David Sutton.

Codron has stated that his "single flash of anger" is aimed at critics and bloggers who review productions during previews. "It's almost invariably reactionary responses. They're the modern equivalent of the lot that used to boo the plays in the 50s and 60s. I think they're ghastly." He has also expressed his dislike of musical theatre ("Musicals weren't really my thing"), turning down a request to produce Blood Brothers.
