= Good Fun =

1980 play by Victoria Wood

The script for Good Fun, published by Methuen in 1988.

Good Fun is a play by Victoria Wood, first performed in 1980. It is set in an arts centre in north west England.

== Origins ==
Wood, keen to trade on her previous stage success Talent, was commissioned to write another play by impresario Michael Codron. "I wrote one called Pals, which he said was 'very enjoyable'. This is a euphemism for wincing, so it went in the bin. I then wrote another called Good Fun."

== Performance ==
The play was first performed in April 1980 at Sheffield's Crucible Theatre. It was directed by David Leland. It starred Annabel Leventon as Liz, Charles McKeown as Frank, Gregory Floy as Mike, Victoria Wood as Lynne, Joe Figg as Kev, Julie Walters as Betty, Noreen Kershaw as Gail and Christopher Hancock as Maurice. The show was then performed at the Crucible Theatre again in June that year with some cast changes. Polly James played Liz, Sam Kelly played Frank and Meg Johnson played Betty.

After the Crucible's second version, the plan was to transfer the play to the West End. Though this never happened, it was performed at the King’s Head Theatre in Islington. Wood said she heard a man at the interval saying "It's a bit witty witty isn't it?" Wood's view of the play was that "there was an awful lot wrong with it but there were some lovely performances and the audiences enjoyed it."

After Good Fun Wood concentrated on television comedy and her career as a stand up comic. However, she did write two more plays, "which to save bothering Michael Codron, I called 'very enjoyable' and put straight in the bin."

== Reviews ==
Robin Thurber of The Guardian said "Good Fun is just that... full of knowing little laughs. Dry laughs, belly laughs, dirty laughs and running giggles". James Fenton of The Sunday Times said "pigeon holers will find a space for (Wood) beside Joe Orton and Ken Dodd...But her voice is characteristically and aggressively female. Just like Talent... Good Funs rude words, hilarious gags and the insights which are more varied than either are all in the mouths of the women at its centre."

== Songs ==
Act One

- "Liz's Song"
- "Community Arts"
- "I've Had It Up To Here"
- "Turned Out Nice Again"

Act Two

- "Make a Joke"
- "Handicrafts"
- "Frank and Gail Duet"
- "I'll Do Anything"
- "Bloody Clowns"
- "Good Fun"
