= School of Rock =

2003 American film directed by Richard Linklater

- Theatrical release poster
- Directed by: Richard Linklater
- Written by: Mike White
- Produced by: Scott Rudin
- Starring: Jack Black; Joan Cusack; Mike White; Sarah Silverman
- Cinematography: Rogier Stoffers
- Edited by: Sandra Adair
- Music by: Craig Wedren
- Production company: Scott Rudin Productions
- Distributed by: Paramount Pictures
- Release date: October 3, 2003
- Running time: 109 minutes
- Country: United States
- Language: English
- Budget: $35 million
- Box office: $131.3 million

The School of Rock, commonly known as School of Rock, is a 2003 American comedy film directed by Richard Linklater, produced by Scott Rudin and written by Mike White. The film stars Jack Black, Joan Cusack, Mike White and Sarah Silverman. Black plays struggling rock guitarist Dewey Finn, who is fired from his band and subsequently poses as a substitute teacher at a prestigious prep school to pay his rent. After witnessing the musical talent of the students, Dewey forms a band of fifth-graders in an attempt to win the upcoming Battle of the Bands as revenge against his former bandmates.

School of Rock was released on October 3, 2003, by Paramount Pictures, grossing $131.3 million worldwide on a $35 million budget. The film received positive reviews from critics, with praise for Black's performance and humor. It was the highest-grossing music-themed comedy of all time until the release of Pitch Perfect 2 in 2015. A stage musical adaptation opened on Broadway in December 2015, and a television adaptation aired for three seasons on Nickelodeon from March 2016 to April 2018.

== Plot ==
Rock band No Vacancy performs at a nightclub three weeks before auditioning for the Battle of the Bands. Guitarist Dewey Finn irritates his bandmates with on-stage antics, culminating in a failed stage dive that abruptly ends the performance. When Dewey arrives for rehearsal the next day, he discovers he has been replaced by another guitarist. Dewey's roommate and best friend Ned Schneebly, urged on by his domineering girlfriend Patty, tells Dewey he must pay his share of rent. While attempting to sell some of his equipment for the money, Dewey answers a phone call from Rosalie Mullins, the principal of the Horace Green prep school, inquiring for Ned about a short-term position as a substitute teacher. Desperate, Dewey impersonates Ned and is hired. On his first day at the school, Dewey adopts the name "Mr. S" (stemming from his inability to spell Schneebly) and behaves erratically, confusing the class.

After overhearing the students in a music class the next day, Dewey devises a plan to form them into a new band and compete with No Vacancy in the Battle of the Bands. He recruits Zack Mooneyham as lead guitarist, Freddy Jones as drummer, cellist Katie on bass, Lawrence on keyboard, and himself as lead vocalist and guitarist. He assigns the rest of the class to various roles of backup singers, groupies, and roadies, with precocious Summer Hathaway given the role of band manager. The project takes over normal lessons but helps the students to embrace their talents and overcome their problems: Dewey bonds with Lawrence, who is worried about not being cool enough for the band; Zack, whose overbearing father disapproves of rock music; and Tomika, an overweight girl who is too self-conscious to even audition to be backup singer despite having a strong voice. Band groupies Michelle and Eleni name the band "The School of Rock".

Two weeks into his hiring, Dewey sneaks his key band members out of school to audition for Battle of the Bands while the rest of the class stay behind to maintain cover. The group is rejected because the bill is full; Summer tells Dewey to deceive the staff into thinking that they have a terminal illness, allowing the band to audition. The next day, Mullins checks on his teaching progress, forcing Dewey to feign teaching the actual material. Dewey later meets with Mullins to set up the competition under the guise of a field trip; the two bond over her love of Stevie Nicks.

Ned receives a paycheck in his name from the school, realizing that Dewey impersonated him. Patty pressures Ned to reveal the truth and reports Dewey's scheme to the police and Mullins. During a parents' meeting, the parents question what Dewey has been teaching the kids before Ned, Patty, Mullins, and the police confront him. Dewey reveals his true identity and is fired. Back home, he and Patty argue until Ned intervenes and suggests Dewey move out.

The next morning, the parents confront Mullins at her office, while the kids decide not to let their hard work go to waste; they go to Dewey's apartment and rally him to join them. Ned decides to attend the show and ends his relationship with Patty. When the new substitute discovers the kids missing, she informs Mullins, who races to the competition with the parents tagging along. A school bus comes to pick up Dewey, who leads the kids to the Battle of the Bands and decides that they play a song written by Zack earlier. Initially dismissed as a gimmick, the band wins over the entire crowd, while the parents are impressed by their children's talent and confidence. However, No Vacancy wins, but the audience chants encore for the School of Rock, who perform for the crowd once again.

Sometime later, Dewey continues the School of Rock as an after-school program, coaching the students he played with before while Ned teaches beginners.

== Cast ==
- Jack Black as Dewey Finn (lead and backing vocals, rhythm guitar), an energetic, down-on-his-luck guitarist slacker who impersonates a substitute teacher.
- Joan Cusack as Rosalie "Roz" Mullins, the overworked principal of the Horace Green prep school who secretly loves rock music.
- Mike White as Ned Schneebly, Dewey's responsible but meek roommate and best friend, who gave up his dream of being a rock star to become a teacher.
- Sarah Silverman as Patty Di Marco, Ned's domineering girlfriend, who strongly dislikes rock music and constantly tries to convince Ned to kick Dewey out of the apartment.
- Lee Wilkof as Mr. Green
- Kate McGregor-Stewart as Mrs. Lemmons
- Adam Pascal as Theo (lead vocals, rhythm guitar)
- Suzzanne Douglas as Tomika's Mother
- Miranda Cosgrove as Summer "Tinker Bell" Hathaway (band manager), the class factotum.
- Kevin Clark as Freddy "Spazzy McGee" Jones (drums)
- Joey Gaydos Jr. as Zack "Zack-Attack" Mooneyham (lead guitar)
- Robert Tsai as Lawrence "Mr. Cool" (keyboards)
- Aleisha Allen as Alicia "Brace Face" (lead and backing vocals)
- Brian Falduto as Billy "Fancy Pants" (band stylist)
- Caitlin Hale as Marta "Blondie" (lead and backing vocals)
- Maryam Hassan as Tomika "Turkey Sub" (lead and backing vocals)
- Rivkah Reyes (Note: Credited as Rebecca Brown; School of Rock was released before Reyes came out as non-binary and changed their name.) as Katie "Posh Spice" (bass)
- Zay Infante (Note: Credited as Zachary Infante; School of Rock was released before Infante came out as a transgender woman and changed her name.) as Gordon "Roadrunner" (lighting designer)
- James Hosey as Marco "Carrot Top" (special effects technician)
- Angelo Massagli as Frankie "Tough Guy" (security)
- Cole Hawkins as Leonard "Short Stop" (security)
- Jordan-Claire Green as Michelle (groupie)
- Veronica Afflerbach as Eleni (groupie)
- Lucas Babin as Spider (lead guitar)
- Lucas Papaelias as Neil (bass, backing vocals)
- Chris Stack as Doug (drums)
- Frank Whaley as Battle of the Bands director (uncredited)

== Production ==
Screenwriter Mike White's concept for the film was inspired by The Langley Schools Music Project. Jack Black once witnessed a stage dive gone wrong involving Ian Astbury of rock band The Cult, which made its way into the film. Filming began on December 2, 2002. Many scenes from the movie were shot around the New York City area. The school portrayed in School of Rock is actually Main Hall at Wagner College in Staten Island. In the film's DVD commentary, the kids say that all of the hallway scenes were shot in one hallway. One of the theaters used in many of the shots was at Union County Performing Arts Center, which is located in Rahway, New Jersey.

== Music ==
=== Soundtrack ===
The eponymous album was released on September 30, 2003. Sammy James Jr. of the band The Mooney Suzuki penned the title track with screenwriter Mike White, and the band backed up Jack Black and the child musicians on the soundtrack recording of the song. The film's director, Richard Linklater, scouted the country for talented 13-year-old musicians to play the rock and roll music featured on the soundtrack and in the film.

The soundtrack includes "Immigrant Song" by Led Zeppelin, a band that has a very long history of denying permission for use of their songs in film and television. Linklater came up with the idea to shoot a video on the stage used at the film's ending, in which Jack Black begs the band for permission with the crowd extras cheering and chanting behind him. The video was sent directly to the living members of Led Zeppelin (Jimmy Page, Robert Plant, and John Paul Jones), who granted permission for the song. The video is included on the DVD and Blu-ray.

=== Songs featured in the film ===
1. "For Those About to Rock (We Salute You)" by AC/DC (Dewey uses the lyrics in a speech to the class)
2. "Fight" by No Vacancy*
3. "Stay Free" by The Clash
4. "Touch Me" by The Doors (Dewey sings this to Lawrence, who plays the keyboard part)*
5. "Do You Remember Rock 'n' Roll Radio?" Ramones cover by Kiss
6. "Sunshine of Your Love" by Cream*
7. "Back in Black" by AC/DC
8. Guitar riffs Dewey plays to Zack:
  1. "Iron Man" by Black Sabbath
  2. "Smoke on the Water" by Deep Purple
  3. "Highway to Hell" by AC/DC
9. "Substitute" by The Who*
10. "The Greatest Love of All" by George Benson (Dewey mentions the lyrics as his reason for no testing)
11. "Roadrunner" by The Modern Lovers
12. "My Brain Is Hanging Upside Down (Bonzo Goes to Bitburg)" by Ramones*
13. "The Wait (Killing Joke cover)" by Metallica
14. "In the Ancient Times" by School of Rock
15. "Sad Wings" by Brand New Sin
16. "Mouthful of Love" by Young Heart Attack
17. "Black Shuck" by The Darkness (on the CD soundtrack release this is switched to another Darkness track "Growing On Me" due to the amount of foul language in "Black Shuck".)
18. "Immigrant Song" by Led Zeppelin*
19. "Math Is a Wonderful Thing" by Jack Black and Mike White*
20. "Set You Free" by The Black Keys*
21. "Edge of Seventeen" by Stevie Nicks*
22. "Ballrooms of Mars" by T. Rex*
23. "Moonage Daydream" by David Bowie
24. "TV Eye" by Wylde Ratttz*
25. "Ride into the Sun" by The Velvet Underground
26. "Heal Me, I'm Heartsick" by No Vacancy*
27. "School of Rock" by School of Rock*
28. "It's a Long Way to the Top (If You Wanna Rock 'n' Roll) (AC/DC cover)" by School of Rock* (featuring The Mooney Suzuki)

* Featured on the Soundtrack album

== Reception ==
=== Box-office performance ===
School of Rock opened at #1 with a weekend gross of $19,622,714 from 2,614 theaters for an average of $7,507 per venue. In its second weekend, the film declined just 21 percent, earning another $15,487,832 after expanding to 2,929 theaters, averaging $5,288 per venue and bringing the ten-day gross to $39,671,396. In its third weekend, it dropped only 28 percent, making another $11,006,233 after expanding once again to 2,951 theaters, averaging $3,730 per venue, and bringing the 17-day gross to $54,898,025. It spent a total of six weeks among the Top 10 films and eventually grossed $81,261,177 in the United States and Canada and another $50,021,772 in international territories for a total gross of $131,282,949 worldwide, almost four times its budget of $35 million. This made School of Rock the highest-grossing music-themed comedy of all time, until it was overtaken in 2015 by Pitch Perfect 2.

=== Critical response ===
School of Rock was highly praised by critics upon release. On Rotten Tomatoes, the film has an approval rating of 92% based on 199 reviews with an average rating of 7.7/10. The site's critical consensus reads, "Black's exuberant, gleeful performance turns School of Rock into a hilarious, rocking good time." On Metacritic, the film has a score of 82 out of 100, based on 41 critics, indicating "universal acclaim". Audiences polled by CinemaScore gave the film an average grade of "A−" on an A+ to F scale.

Rating the film 3.5 stars out of 4, Roger Ebert wrote that School of Rock "proves you can make a family film that's alive and well acted and smart and perceptive and funny—and that rocks."

In 2024, Looper ranked it number 41 on its list of the "50 Best PG-13 Movies of All Time," writing "As a feel-good movie for the whole family, its powerful messaging of championing creativity, self-expression, and the pursuit of passion leaves viewers of all ages with a sense of joy and optimism after every viewing."

In 2025, it was one of the films voted for the "Readers' Choice" edition of The New York Times' list of "The 100 Best Movies of the 21st Century," finishing at number 180.

=== Awards and nominations ===
The film was nominated for several awards, including Black receiving a Golden Globe Award nomination for Best Actor – Comedy or Musical (which he lost to Bill Murray for Lost in Translation), and winning an MTV Movie Award for Best Comedic Performance. In 2004, the film won Best Comedy Film at the British Comedy Awards.

== Legacy ==
=== Possible sequel ===
In 2008, Jack Black said that a sequel was being considered. It was later reported that director Richard Linklater and producer Scott Rudin would return. Mike White was returning as screenwriter for the sequel, titled School of Rock 2: America Rocks, which picks up with Finn leading a group of summer school students on a cross-country field trip that delves into the history of rock 'n' roll. In 2012, Black stated that he believed the sequel was unlikely, saying, "I tried really hard to get all the pieces together. I wouldn't want to do it without the original writer and director, and we never all got together and saw eye-to-eye on what the script would be. It was not meant to be, unfortunately," but added, "never say never". Consequently, to the latter statement, in 2023, Black revealed during an interview that a direct sequel film to School of Rock was in development along with a Tenacious D film, saying, "Yup. Both of them. Breaking news. We're thinking about doing both of those."

=== Stage adaptation ===
On April 5, 2013, Andrew Lloyd Webber announced that he had bought the rights to School of Rock for a stage musical. On December 18, 2014, the musical was officially confirmed and it was announced that the show would receive its world premiere on Broadway in autumn 2015, at the Winter Garden Theatre. It ultimately began previews on November 9, 2015, and opened on December 6, 2015. The musical has a book by Downton Abbey creator Julian Fellowes, and is directed by Laurence Connor, with choreography by JoAnn M. Hunter, set and costume design by Anna Louizos and lighting by Natasha Katz. The musical features an original score composed by Lloyd Webber, with lyrics by Glenn Slater and sound design by Mick Potter, in addition to music from the original film. School of Rock became Lloyd Webber's first show opening on Broadway before London since Jesus Christ Superstar in 1971. The stage adaptation eventually closed on January 20, 2019, having grossed $160,145,109 over the course of 1,309 performances.

=== 10-year reunion ===
On August 29, 2013, a 10th-anniversary screening of the film was held in Austin, Texas, at the Paramount Theatre. Those in attendance included director Richard Linklater, Jack Black, Mike White, Miranda Cosgrove and the rest of the young cast members, except for Cole Hawkins (who played Leonard). Hosted by the Austin Film Society and Cirrus Logic, the event included a red carpet, a full cast and crew Q&A after the screening, where the now-grown child stars discussed their current pursuits in life, and a VIP after-party performance by the School of Rock band during which "School of Rock", "The Legend of The Rent", "Step Off" and "It's a Long Way to the Top (If You Wanna Rock 'n' Roll)" were played.

=== Television adaptation ===
On August 4, 2014, Nickelodeon announced that it was working with Paramount Television to develop a television show adaptation of the film. Production started in the fall and the series premiered in 2016. It starred Breanna Yde, Ricardo Hurtado, Jade Pettyjohn, Lance Lim, Aidan Miner and Tony Cavalero. The series adaptation of School of Rock ran for three seasons from March 12, 2016, to April 8, 2018.
