= Duck Duck Goose (film) =

2018 computer-animated film

- Theatrical release poster
- Directed by: Chris Jenkins
- Screenplay by: Rob Muir; Chris Jenkins; Scott Atkinson; Tegan West
- Story by: Chris Jenkins
- Produced by: Penney Finkelman Cox; Sandra Rabins
- Starring: Jim Gaffigan; Zendaya; Lance Lim; Greg Proops; Natasha Leggero; Stephen Fry; Craig Ferguson; Carl Reiner
- Edited by: Lisa Linder-Silver
- Music by: Mark Isham
- Production companies: GFM Animation; Wanda Pictures; Original Force Animation; Jiangsu Yuandongli Computer Animation Co., Ltd
- Distributed by: Netflix (North America); GEM Entertainment; Film & TV House (International)
- Release dates: March 9, 2018 (China); July 20, 2018 (United States)
- Running time: 91 minutes
- Countries: United States; China
- Languages: English; Mandarin
- Box office: $19.6 million

Duck Duck Goose (simplified Chinese: 妈妈咪鸭; traditional Chinese: 媽媽咪鴨; pinyin: Māmā mīyā; lit. 'Mommy duck') is a 2018 animated adventure comedy film directed by Chris Jenkins, who wrote the original story and co-wrote the screenplay with Rob Muir, Scott Atkinson, and Tegan West. It stars the voices of Jim Gaffigan, Zendaya and Carl Reiner. An international co-production between the United States, China and the United Kingdom, the film was released in China in March 2018 with an intended North American theatrical release date of April 2018 before being pulled from the schedule following the closure of Open Road Films.

Duck Duck Goose was released by Netflix in North America on July 20, 2018 and received negative reviews from critics.

== Plot ==
A carefree swan goose named Peng whose flock is migrating in China. His attitude and demeanor is disapproved by leader Bing, who he and his flock abandon while Peng is asleep. Meanwhile, Chi and Chao, a pair of ducklings on their way to a mystical place called Pleasant Valley, ends up being separated from their flock due to a careless stunt from Peng. To hide from Banzou the sinister Pallas’s cat, they end up sleeping with Peng after they see him fending off Banzou. Surprised by their presence, Peng ends up recklessly flying away from them before he breaks his wing with a gong. Flightless and frightened, Peng decides to use the ducklings to fend himself off from predators, and return safely to his flock. The ducklings reluctantly agree to go with him.

After a series of misadventures, Peng starts to grow on the ducklings, however, before he agrees to help the ducklings reunite with their flock, he comes across his own flock, where Chi and Chao discover his true intentions. The two groups end up parting their own separate ways, as they try to get to their destinations. Peng attempts to fly one more time, but is soon knocked down by the red squirrel Carl. Carl builds Peng a makeshift wing for him. Inspired, Peng decides to use the wing to head back to Chi and Chao. However, when the ducklings reunite with their flock, they soon realize that Pleasant Valley is actually a restaurant that serves ducklings. Peng rescues Chi and Chao, however, during their escape, they get separated again. Banzou returns and holds the ducklings hostage, Peng confronts Banzou, but becomes badly injured from fighting him. Chi and Chao light a rocket and launch him into the sky to his demise.

Weakened, Peng tries to bring Chi and Chao back with his flock, but a snow storm makes him worse. The ducklings fly him towards the spring where the geese are, and Chao, remembering a honk Peng taught him calls for Peng's girlfriend Jingjing, who ultimately ends up rescuing him. The geese welcome the ducks, Bing allows the ducklings in the flock, even Peng who has now been responsible. Peng introduces Jingjing to Chi and Chao, and tells her that might end up having more children.

In a mid credits scene, Larry, a turtle who was trying to warn Peng of Banzou's intentions, makes his way to valley, only to find everyone gone.

== Cast ==
- Jim Gaffigan as Peng, a narcissistic swan goose, the main protagonist
- Zendaya as Chi, a female baby Mandarin duck who is Chao's older sister
- Lance Lim as Chao, a male baby Mandarin duck who is Chi's younger brother
- Greg Proops as Banzou, a dissociative Pallas's cat, the main antagonist
- Natasha Leggero as Jinjing, Peng's love interest whose feathers are all white.
- Stephen Fry as Frazier, a red-crowned crane who's mating with Giles
- Craig Ferguson as Giles, a red-crowned crane who's mating with Frazier
- Reggie Watts as Carl, a red and white giant flying squirrel. He is a healer and a hang-glider. He healed Peng's wing when Peng needed help to fly
- Carl Reiner as Larry, a softshell turtle
- Jennifer Grey as Edna, a hen
- Diedrich Bader as Bing, a swan goose who is JinJing's father
- Rick Overton as Stanley, a rooster

== Release ==
The film was released in China on March 9, 2018. There, it would go on to gross $5,865,892 by the end of April. In other territories, it earned $9,434,082 for a worldwide total of $15,299,974. In 2019, the box office gross changed to $19,676,514.

It was originally intended to be theatrically released in the United States by Open Road Films on April 20, 2018, before being removed from the release schedule following the closure of Open Road Films, and ultimately ending up as a Netflix original film, with a projected release of July 20.
