= Malibu Rescue =

2019 American Film created by Scott McAboy & Savage Steve Holland

- Genre: Action-adventure; Comedy
- Created by: Savage Steve Holland; Scott McAboy
- Starring: Ricardo Hurtado; Breanna Yde; Jackie R. Jacobson; Abby Donnelly; Alkoya Brunson
- Composer: Zack Ryan
- Country of origin: United States
- Original language: English
- No. of seasons: 1
- No. of episodes: 8 (plus 2 films)

Production
- Executive producers: Scott Thomas; Jed Elinoff; Savage Steve Holland; Scott McAboy
- Producer: Amy Sydorick
- Cinematography: Keith Dunkerley
- Editors: Michael John Bateman; Simon Davidson; Daria Ellerman
- Production companies: Pacific Bay Entertainment; Entertainment Force

Original release
- Network: Netflix
- Release: May 13, 2019 – August 4, 2020

Malibu Rescue is an American comedy television series created by Savage Steve Holland and Scott McAboy for Netflix. It premiered as a special feature-length film on May 13, 2019, followed by the first season on June 3, 2019. Netflix commissioned a second film in September 2019, Malibu Rescue: The Next Wave, which premiered on August 4, 2020 and ran as the number four watched movie that week. The series stars Ricardo Hurtado, Jackie R. Jacobson, Abby Donnelly, Alkoya Brunson and Breanna Yde.

== Plot ==
After getting in trouble one too many times, Tyler's stepfather punishes him by sending him to the Malibu Junior Rescue Program. There, Tyler meets a ragtag group of children from the Valley. Together, the group sets to prove that they deserve to participate in the program along with all the other children from Malibu.

When the program director, Garvin Cross, reveals that he only let Tyler and the rest of the Flounders into the program so that they would fail and he would not have to take children from the Valley anymore, Tyler and the Flounders come together as a team to win a big lifeguard competition and earn their own tower for the summer.

== Cast and characters ==
=== Main ===
- Ricardo Hurtado as Tyler Gossard, an overly-competitive teenage boy, forced to join the Malibu Junior Rescue by his stepfather as punishment
- Jackie R. Jacobson as Dylan, the Flounders' first-time tower captain, who lacks self-confidence and is the first female tower captain
- Abby Donnelly as Lizzie McGrath, a bubbly and spunky teenager with a dark side, who has an overprotective mother and is in a relationship with Eric
- Alkoya Brunson as Eric Mitchell, the heart of the group. He is in a relationship with Lizzie.
- Breanna Yde as Gina, a tough and self-assured athlete who tries to live up to her family's legacy of great swimmers

=== Recurring ===
- Ian Ziering as Garvin Cross, the director of the program determined to get the Flounders kicked out of the program
- JT Neal as Brody, a returning tower captain who hates the Flounders and wants them kicked out
- Bryana Salaz as Logan, Brody's friend, who eventually befriends Dylan. She lost her chance to become a tower captain because there is usually only one girl captain
- Jeremy Howard as Vooch, a bus driver and friend of the Flounders who also operates a food truck
- Camaron Engels as Spencer, Brody's friend and captain for Tower 3.
- Zahf Paroo as Thornton Pavey, a rich donor who later runs the Malibu junior rescue program to sabotage the Flounders
- Ryder Blackburn as Beans, a lifeguard friend who seems to always be getting into trouble or sleeping
- Jeff Meacham as Roger Gossard, Tyler's stepfather
- Ella Gross as Sasha Gossard, Tyler's stepsister

=== Guest ===
- Curtis Armstrong as Mr. Rathbone, a school janitor
- Catia Ojeda as Diane, Tyler's mother
- Treisa Gary as Officer Wagstaff
- Michael Mourra as Jeffy
- Austin Fryberger as Craig
- Molly Haldeman as Jeffy's Mom
- Rodney J. Hobbs as The Mayor
- Mary Passeri as Lizzie's Mom
- Anthony Alabi as Derek Mitchell, Eric's father (season 1)
- Angel Laketa Moore as Mrs. Mitchel, Eric's mother (season 1)
- Kartik Ash as Chote Pavey, Pavey's son (season 1)
- Leigh-Allyn Baker as Dylan's Mom (season 1)

== Episodes ==
Season	Episodes	Originally released
Movie		May 13, 2019
1	8	June 3, 2019
Movie		August 4, 2020

=== Movie (2019) ===
Title	Directed by	Written by	Original release date
"Malibu Rescue – The Movie"	Savage Steve Holland	Jed Elinoff & Scott Thomas (Created By: Savage Steve Holland & Scott McAboy)	May 13, 2019
In the San Fernando Valley on the last day of school, trouble making teenager Tyler Gossard accidentally ensues a chase around his school campus after instigating a fight with his bully. After a series of events, Officer Wagstaff visits Tyler's home and informs the family of Tyler's mischief. Tyler's mother suggest that he help the school janitor during the summer cleanup, but Tyler's step-father, Roger, suggests he attend Junior Rescue, a program hosted in Malibu Beach that focuses on being a lifeguard, with an annual competition called the Crucible hosted at the end of the month that decides who gets a tower to help guard the beach during the summer. Tyler's day gets better after learning that Vooch, his favorite bus driver, will be driving him to Malibu. Vooch picks up the athletic and sarcastic Gina, and the witty and intelligent Lizzie, whose mother suggests that going to Junior Rescue is a bad idea. Unbeknownst to Vooch, the nonathletic and truthful Eric had missed the bus and has followed Vooch across the state. Arriving at Malibu Beach, Tyler helps up the sweaty Eric and meets Dylan, a clumsy and kind captain at Junior Rescue. To Tyler's dismay, Eric informs him of Junior Rescue's true purpose and instantly forms a rivalry with fellow captain Brody, who hates kids from the Valley. Other captain Spencer leads the team on several exercises that include a two mile run, carrying ten pound bags, paddling across shore, all while Brody mocks Tyler's physical strength. Dylan struggles while explaining the purpose of Junior Rescue and is routinely mocked by Brody and the other captains. During a standardized swim test, Tyler notices that Gina is on the swim team, but is suspicious when she keeps fumbling in the water. Arriving home from Junior Rescue, Tyler wishes to quit; Roger forbids it. The next day, Brody assigns the kids to their training pods and captains to help guide them throughout the program. Brody takes lead of the "Dogfish" while Dylan is assigned Tyler, Gina, Lizzie, and Eric, otherwise known as the "Flounders.". During several training exercises, Tyler rigs them and creates several mayhem throughout the day in order to get kicked out of Junior Rescue. When Tyler removes the screws on Brody's lifeguard chair, Garvin, the program's leader, refuses to remove Tyler from the program and puts the blame on Dylan. Garvin reveals that he was forced by the Mayor to accept kids from non-beach cities into the program, and decides to take advantage of Tyler's situation to show the Mayor that the Valley doesn't deserve to be included. While the Flounders rebuild the chair, they spot a man that is drowning in the ocean. The Flounders pod springs into action, but the whole thing is revealed to be a ruse created by Brody to humiliate the Flounders. A kid named Jeffy begins messing with Tyler while attempting to avoid his suspicious mother. On the ride home, Vooch's bus breaks down while the kids wait for him on a deserted spot near the road. While reconciling with the kids, Tyler is motivated to start putting effort into the program. Tyler and the rest of the kids begin improving during their training exercises, alarming Garvin. Garvin then allows Tyler to leave the program, but Tyler refuses, satisfied with how the Flounders have become like a family to him. While attempting to get revenge on Brody, Tyler inadvertently ruins a sand sculpting competition, allowing Garvin to kick out Tyler and ruining the Flounders' chances at winning the Crucible. Tyler then spends the rest of the summer helping the janitor, but is confronted by the Flounders, who have since learned of Garvin's motives and come to reveal to Tyler that the sculpting competition is outside of Garvin's jurisdiction, which doesn't give Garvin the right to have kicked out Tyler. Arriving at the Crucible, the Flounders reveal to Garvin their plan to win the Crucible but are interrupted by the mayor, who has come to see the progress of the Flounders during the competition. Garvin decides to then attempt to sabotage the Flounders, but is bested when the Flounders get a lead in the Crucible. During the swimming portion of the Crucible, Gina reveals that she is not actually part of the swim team and had actually come to Junior Rescue to help overcome her struggle in the water. Tyler motivates her and helps her overpower her fears, which ends with Tyler getting on an ATV in the final portion of the race. Midway through, he is stopped by Jeffy's mother, who reveals that Jeffy had stowed away in a rouge boat and asks the Flounders to rescue him from oncoming flammable oil barrels on the pier. Forced to cooperate, Lizzie drives the Flounders out to the boat while Eric catches Jeffy when Gina throws him from the boat. Tyler them misdirects the boat to hit jagged rocks. Returning to shore, the Flounders are hailed heroes by the crowd. In a twist of events, the mayor is revealed to be Jeffy's father from a failed marriage. He thanks the Flounders for their bravery and forces Garvin to give the Flounders a tower. Garvin reluctantly agrees in hopes of keeping his job, encountering his old fellow Junior Rescue buddy, who is revealed to be Roger, who states that he is proud of Tyler. The next day, the Flounders see their new tower and set out to own the summer.

=== Season 1 (2019) ===
No. overall	No. in season	Title	Directed by	Written by	Original release date
1	1	"Fresh Off the Bus"	Savage Steve Holland	Jed Elinoff & Scott Thomas	June 3, 2019
The team begin their first day as part of the Malibu Rescue program but it is not what they are expecting. The team's rival, Brody is tasked with giving each team their assignments and gives the team the worst jobs such as cleaning duty, scooping dog poop off the beach and sanitizing used beach items. Brody reveals that he gives them the hard and disgusting jobs because they are children from the valley and he doesn't think that they deserve the kinds of jobs other teams have. Tyler comes up with a plan to prank him but his team convinces him not to go through with it. However, when Tyler attempts to back out of the prank he unknowingly traps Brody which ends up with Brody being stuck in a net and trapped near a cliff moments of getting hurt. In the end, Dylan saves him while making Brody promise to stop giving them all of the bad assignments.
2	2	"Escape from Party Beach"	Savage Steve Holland	Jim Martin	June 3, 2019
Although the team members are getting the hang of the rescue program, they aren't getting a good reputation. The members of the other team especially Brody's still refuse to accept them as part of the program as well as Garvin who receives a bad review about them. When they try to do nice things, they make the situation worse. The team decide to throw a beach party with the help of Vooch who has plenty of party equipment. Meanwhile, Eric tries to teach Gina how to be nice with a series of obstacles and tests. She successfully learns how to be nice. When they come to the beach party, things get out of hand fast which ends up with Gina immediately enforcing the rules and saving someone's life in the process. They slowly start to get accepted by other teams and the bad review wasn't about them. It was about a person from a different team.
3	3	"The Splash and the Furious"	Scott McAboy	Anthony C. Hill	June 3, 2019
Thornton Pavey, a guy that Garvin absolutely hates pays a visit to the rescue program. Despite Garvin's protests he donates a bunch of Jet Skis to the program as a gift. Garvin then creates a sea patrol but for a person to try out they must have a signed permission slip. Lizzie's overprotective mother does not sign but everyone else gets theirs in. Because Eric likes Lizzie, he lies and says his parents didn't sign either. Eager to get on the Jet Ski, Tyler and Gina take one out for a joy ride without the knowledge of Dylan or how to work it and ignoring Dylan when she tries to explain it to them. They end up stuck on a beach but do figure out a way to make it back in time for the races. Lizzie poses as Eric during the race and gets a spot on the sea patrol. To keep that spot, she forges her mother's signature on a permission slip and hands it in.
4	4	"Sand and Deliver"	Scott McAboy	Rick Williams	June 3, 2019
The rescue program's annual family day arrives and it's bound to be one for the books. Tyler's mother and stepsister Sasha visit but Roger doesn't. Sasha disapproves of everything and makes Tyler's tour of the place miserable. Gina's family does not attend the event. Eric's parents arrive and upon seeing Eric with Lizzie they begin to suspect something. Lizzie's mother meets Eric's parents and Lizzie tells them that she is in a relationship with Eric. Eric has trouble keeping up with this lie so during lunch Lizzie does the talking and Eric remains silent. Gina spends the day with Dylan who dresses up in a dolphin costume and takes pictures with the little children but ends up overheating but Gina successfully gets her out of the costume. Lizzie and Eric's parents find out that they lied. Eric's mother and father are fine but Lizzie's mother nearly pulls her out of the program but Lizzie manages to calm her down. Tyler, Sasha and his mother end up drifting out to sea in an outhouse and Tyler helps deliver his baby sister after his mother is forced to give birth in there. At the end of family day, each parent relationship is strengthened and Lizzie as well as Eric begin to realize they have feelings for each other.
5	5	"Stranger Flings"	April Winney	Molly Haldeman & Camila Rubis	June 3, 2019
Dylan makes a presentation about trying to save the sea turtles which no one pays attention to. While patrolling, Gina stops a boy from harming sea turtles but finds out from a member of a rival team that the boy is Chote Pavey the son of Thornton who donated the jet skis earlier in the series. To make things better between Chote and Gina Chote throws a party for all of the rescue participants. During the party, Chote and Gina get into playful competitions while Dylan has trouble having fun at the party due to previous doubts about going in the first place. After Tyler questions her, she reveals that the waitress serving the tacos at the taco bar is her mother and is ashamed that she isn't rich like Spencer and Logan, members of the rival team. Tyler manages to have her feel proud of what her mother does and stands up to Spencer. Gina and Chote's playful competitions end up with Gina saving Chote's life after he falls off a cliff and into the ocean. At the end, Lizzie and Eric tell each other how they really feel while Chote promises to stop antagonizing Gina.
6	6	"With a Little Kelp from My Friends"	Shannon Flynn	Danielle Calvert	June 3, 2019
The team is named "Tower of the Week" to the dismay of Garvin and Brody. While on Kelp duty, Eric and Tyler are taken by two people in cloaks which are covering their faces. The two of them as well as members of other teams including Brody and Spencer are invited to join a secret society run by Garvin. While that takes place, Dylan beings to form a friendship with Logan. To join the society, the boys have to write down their darkest secrets in a book, fill Thornton's van with kelp and tell no one about the society. Dylan, Gina, Lizzie and Logan eventually find out about the society after interrogating Tyler in Vooch's bus. They decide to end this after finding it discriminating. At the meeting, the girls as well as Tyler take down the society. Eric reveals he ripped the pages filled with secrets out of the book, replaced them with phone book pages and burns the pages with secrets. The society comes to an end. Garvin gets fired and a mysterious person rips off his necklace and smashes it outside.
7	7	"Pier Pressure"	Scott McAboy	Brittany Assaly	June 3, 2019
Spencer finds Garvin's smashed necklace and realizes Garvin is gone. As the summer nearly ends, Thornton is revealed to be Garvin's replacement as the director of the Malibu Rescue program and is much nicer than Garvin. Lizzie and Eric begin to enjoy some quality time together before summer ends. Dylan and Logan's friendship begins to strengthen. However, things aren't going so great. A man sneaks into their tower and takes pictures. They catch him and Thornton lets them have some fun at the pier. Logan hangs out with Tyler which makes Dylan jealous. Although everyone has fun, the true intentions are revealed later. Logan was using Tyler and never was Dylan's friend. An emergency happens near the team's tower but Logan saves a man from drowning and it's the same man from earlier. Thornton had set them up and kicks them out of the program. Logan gets their tower and Thornton pays the man who isn't hurt and says he'll get the second half when part two of the plan is complete.
8	8	"Every Rose Has Its Thornton"	Savage Steve Holland	Jed Elinoff & Scott Thomas	June 3, 2019
After getting kicked out, the team as well as Logan, suspect that something is up. Logan reveals that she really wanted to be Dylan's friend. The team meets up at the beach and decide to sneak into Thornton's house with help from Vooch. They get in while Gina distracts Chote from noticing them. However, Thornton finds them and locks them in his closet. They manage to escape and find out that Thornton plans to blow up a tower and blame it on them as they are from the valley. While checking every tower, Eric and Tyler manage to defeat the man Thornton hired. The girls stop Thornton and reveal his entire scheme to the other members of the junior rescue. Thornton and the man are arrested. The team agrees to give the Junior Rescuer of the Year award to Dylan. Roger becomes head of the program for the following summer. Eric and Lizzie have their first kiss as the team leaves to go home.

=== Movie (2020) ===
Title	Directed by	Written by	Original release date
"Malibu Rescue: The Next Wave"	Savage Steve Holland	Jed Elinoff & Scott Thomas (Created By: Savage Steve Holland & Scott McAboy)	August 4, 2020
A year after the events of the first film, Tower Two (Flounders) help rescue a man surrounded by sharks. This whole event is revealed to be a dream by Dylan, who fears getting attached to Tyler after seemingly developing a connection with him. Roger, who now leads the Junior Rescue program after Garvin's termination, reminds Tyler that Malibu is hosting the annual International Junior Rescue Competition that year. With the help of Lizzie, Gina, and Vooch, Tyler is able to sneak Eric out of summer school and places a dummy stowaway in his place. Arriving at Malibu Beach, the Flounders realize that they are gonna be serving food for the teams competing. Having had enough of team USA (Ashley, Spencer, Brody, Gooch, and Izzy), Tyler puts expired coleslaw in their meals, leading to the team being sent to the hospital with a severe case of food poisoning. Tyler hides this from the team. With no Team USA, Rogers deduces that they will not be able to win the competition a 5th time. He then reveals that due to low sign-ups to junior rescue, the program will be disbanded at the end of the year. Tyler then decides to take Team USA's place in hopes of saving the program, although the rest are not on board. While watching videos of the past competitions, Tyler begins second guessing, although gets encouragement from Dylan; Gina volunteers to train the Flounders due to the fact that her father is an Iraq war veteran. The Flounders endure through several training exercises such as digging through sand, climbing Malibu cargo containers, and struggling with diffusing a firefighter water hose. The Flounders encounter Team Aussie (Australia) and are mocked after observing the Flounders struggling with putting out the hose. After Team Aussie's leader, Wayno, breaks a wrench in half, Tyler wonders if Team USA will really win the competition. Jeffy develops a crush on Sasha. During a training exercise, the Flounders see a couple whose canoe has flipped and are now drowning. Due to being entangled in ropes, The Aussies step in and save the couple, showing an intense rivalry forming between the two teams. Gina decides to become harder on the team, while Eric and Lizzie's relationship struggle. Eric is left alone after unintentionally offending everyone. During a pep talk from Gina, the Aussies offend the Flounders while showing off during Training, leading to Gina apologizing to the team for being hard on everyone. The Flounders make up, but Tyler reveals he put the expired coleslaw on the plates, leading to him abandoning the team. Jeffy attempts to woo Sasha, but she rebuffs him. Tyler arrives at Brody's house and apologizes to him, but gives closure to Brody after revealing he had felt like he let everyone down. By insulting him, Tyler is inspired by Brody to never give up. On the day of the competition, Eric and Lizzie apologize to each other for texting during art class, leading to Eric having to attend summer school. The Flounders reunite and apologize. Gina gives the team a pep talk about believing, leading to the Aussies intimidating them in the process. Using Jeffy as a decoy, Sasha leads the Aussies into a cargo container to attend a rescue, but end up getting trapped by Sasha. Sasha reveals this to the Flounders and leads them to the container, only to find that it is being taken away by a transport truck. While Brody watches the competition on TV, the Flounders chase after the truck and attempt to alert the driver, to no avail. The Flounders find out that the container is being taken to the Malibu Port and will be shipped off to an unknown site. While Africa takes the lead and with only minutes left until USA is up, Tyler attempts a rescue. Dylan kisses Tyler before he jumps on to the moving truck. Tyler opens the latch on the door and the driver makes a stop, allowing the team to jump off and get in the bus. With USA up next, the Flounders arrive at the beach and race off against Australia. Gina takes the lead during the sand tunnel portion of the race, while the rest help each other up during the rope climb and wall climb portions. The teams race past each other in the finale, where Tyler falls and slips from a ring and injures his knee, while Wayno taunts at him and wins the race, which upsets Brody, the Flounders help Tyler finish the race, which gets a crowd cheering their name. When Jeffy attempts to sign up for Junior Rescue, Roger and the rest find out that a lot of kids want to sign up after hearing of the rescue they pulled off on the freeway. Eric returns in time to deceive the students and teachers, where he is dismissed for the year. A new batch of Valley kids show up at Junior Rescue. The Flounders look on proudly.
