= Le Dîner de Cons =

Comedy play by Francis Veber

Le Dîner de Cons (French pronunciation: [lə di'ne də kɔ̃], lit. 'The Dinner of Fools') is a French comedy play by Francis Veber. It premiered in 1993.

== Story ==
Pierre Brochant, a Parisian publisher, attends a weekly "idiots' dinner", where guests, who are prominent Parisian businessmen, must bring along an "idiot" whom the other guests can ridicule. At the end of the dinner, the evening's champion idiot is selected.

With the help of an "idiot scout", Brochant manages to find a "gem", François Pignon, a Finance Ministry employee whose passion is building replicas of landmarks with matchsticks. After Brochant starts to suffer from lower back pain, his wife, Christine, leaves him shortly before Pignon arrives at his apartment. Brochant initially wants Pignon to leave, but instead becomes reliant on him, because of his back problem, and his need to resolve his relationship problems. He solicits Pignon's assistance in making a series of telephone calls to locate his wife, but Pignon gaffes each time, including revealing the existence of Brochant's mistress, Marlene Sasseur, to his wife, Christine.

Brochant is also able to make amends with an old friend, Juste LeBlanc, from whom he stole Christine. Arriving at the apartment, LeBlanc switches between assisting Brochant, and laughing uncontrollably at his discomfiture. Brochant believes Christine has gone to Pascal Meneaux, a notorious philanderer. Brochant does not know how to locate Meneaux, so Pignon tries to help by bringing in a friend, Lucien Cheval, a civil servant who has Meneaux's details "on his files". Cheval arrives, but turns out to be a tax inspector, to the further distress of the wealthy Brochant, who has been evading tax, and is forced to quickly hide most of his valuables. In the act of calling the womaniser Meneaux, the tax auditor makes an unpleasant discovery about his own wife and leaves, threatening to audit Meneaux and possibly Brochant as well.

Pignon eventually discovers the truth behind the dinner that Brochant wanted to take him to. His feeling are hurt, but, well-intentioned as ever, he tries to make up for all his mistakes by calling Brochant's wife, who had been involved in a car accident after leaving the apartment for the second time (the first time being when Pignon had sent her away thinking she was really Brochant's mistress). For once he makes no mistakes in this conversation, speaking emotionally and sincerely about his own marital break up (in response to which he took up his hobby), and making up almost perfect excuses on the spot.

However, after encouraging Christine to return home, Pignon makes a final gaffe: he picks up the telephone when she calls to talk to Brochant despite having previously told her he was in a phone booth, thus arousing her suspicions that he has simply been repeating lines fed to him by Brochant (as he indeed had been in previous conversations).

== Title ==
The title, Le Dîner de Cons can be translated into English as "The Dinner of Fools" (which is one translation used for the title of the film version, the other being "The Dinner Game"). "Con" can be translated as "prat", not as is popularly believed to be the English equivalent for "Connasse": "Cunt". Perhaps an accurate translation would be "The Prats' Dinner". An English-language stage adaptation uses the euphemism See You Next Tuesday as its title. An American film adaptation uses the title "Dinner for Schmucks".

== Stage adaptations ==
- An English version of the play debuted at the Gate Theatre in Dublin in 2002, starring Ardal O'Hanlon (as Pignon) and Risteárd Cooper, and transferred to London's Albery Theatre in 2003, starring Nigel Havers alongside O'Hanlon. Ronald Harwood adapted the play and shifted the action to a Tuesday so he could employ the euphemism See You Next Tuesday as its title. The director in both Dublin and London was Robin Lefevre.
- A Chinese translation at the Shanghai Dramatic Arts Centre in 2010 starred Canadian freelance performer Dashan as Pierre Brochant.
- Theater Without Railings (Divadlo Bez Zábradlí), Prague: directed by Jiří Menzel, translated by Antonie Miklíková Görök, starring Václav Vydra (Pierre Brochant), Josef Carda (Francois Pignon), Jana Boušková.
- Eastern Bohemian Theatre (Východočeské Divadlo), Pardubice: directed by Hana Mikolášková, music by Petr Hromádka, starring Alexandr Postler (Francois Pignon), Martin Mejzlík (Pierre Brochant).
- A Greek version debuted in Athens in 2016 at Kappa Theatre, starring Spyros Papadopoulos and Pigmalion Dadakaridis.
- A Polish version debuted in Warsaw in 2001 at Ateneum Theatre, starring Piotr Fronczewski (Brochant) and Krzysztof Tyniec (Pignon) and is still running as of December 2022. It is also played in other cities and on tour.
- A Romanian version debuted in Bucharest in 2010 at Bucharest National Theatre, starring Horaţiu Mălăele (Pignon) and Ion Caramitru (Brochant) and Costina Cheyrouze (Christine) and is still running as of June 2023. It is also played on tour.

== Film adaptations ==
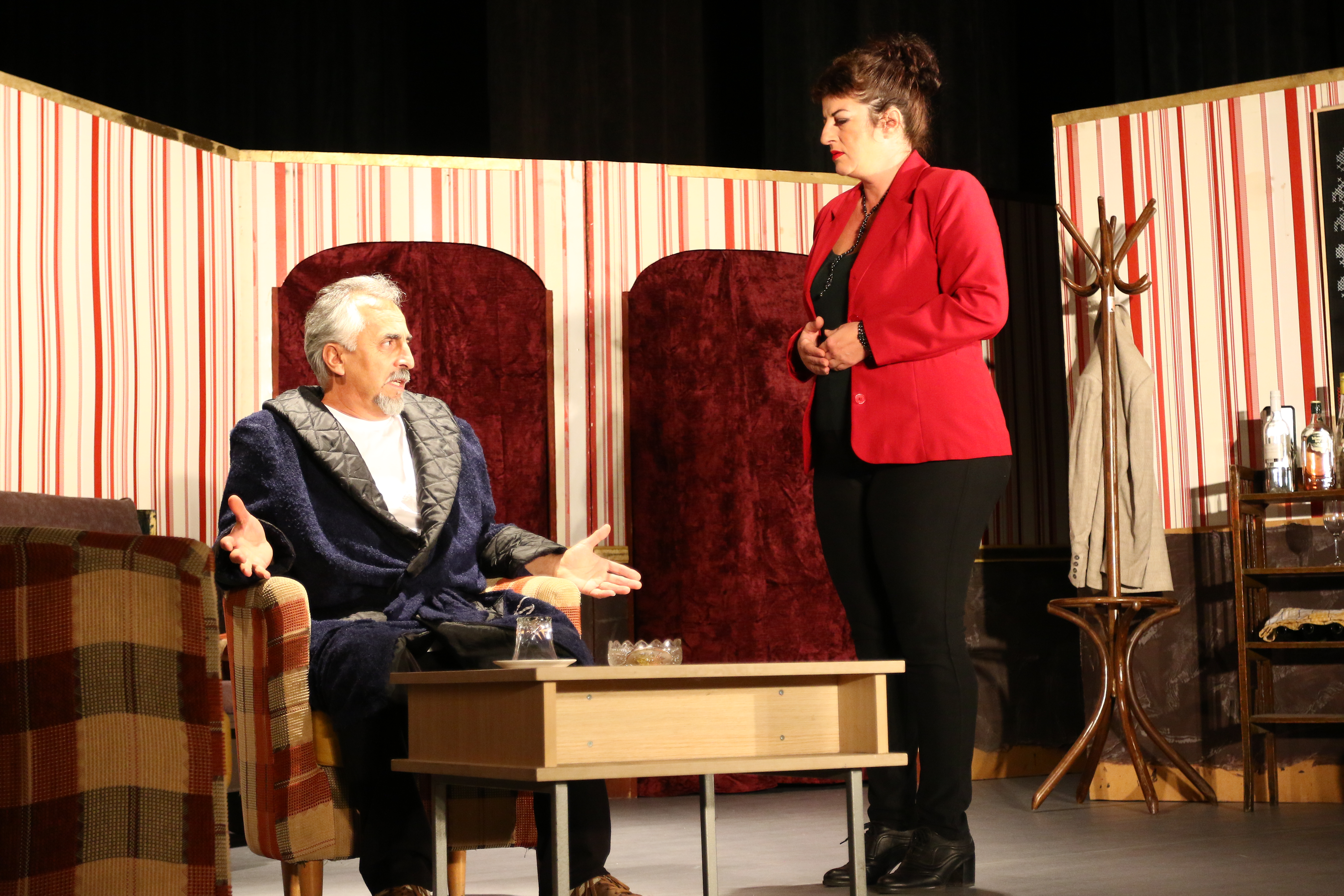
- A moment from the production "Dinner for Fools" by Francis Weber, staged by the Hristo Botev Theater at the Tsaribrod Cultural Center, Serbia, directed by Delcho Gigov. Part of the Traveling Theater Festival, Slivnitsa 2016.
  Le Dîner de Cons, known in English as The Dinner of Fools or The Dinner Game, released in 1998
- Bollywood remake Bheja Fry, released April 13, 2007
- Kannada remake Mr. Garagasa starring Komal and Anant Nag released summer 2008
- Malayalam remake April Fool released in 2010
- American remake Dinner for Schmucks starring Steve Carell and Paul Rudd released July 30, 2010
