= Country Comfort (TV series) =

2021 American comedy streaming television series

- Genre: Comedy
- Created by: Caryn Lucas
- Starring: Katharine McPhee; Eddie Cibrian; Ricardo Hurtado; Jamie Martin Mann; Griffin McIntyre; Shiloh Verrico; Pyper Braun
- Music by: Tim Lauer
- Country of origin: United States
- Original language: English
- No. of seasons: 1
- No. of episodes: 10

Production
- Executive producer: Caryn Lucas
- Producer: Matt Conner
- Cinematography: George Mooradian
- Editors: Michael Karlich; Andy Cruz
- Camera setup: Multi-camera
- Running time: 20–27 minutes
- Production company: Kiki Productions

Original release
- Network: Netflix
- Release: March 19, 2021

Country Comfort is an American comedy television series created by Caryn Lucas that premiered on Netflix on March 19, 2021. In July 2021, the series was canceled after one season.

== Cast and characters ==
=== Main ===
- Katharine McPhee as Bailey, a country singer who takes a job as a nanny after getting kicked out of her up-and-coming band with her boyfriend
- Eddie Cibrian as Beau, a cowboy and widower who is raising five children alone in his ranch known as Harmony Hills
- Ricardo Hurtado as Tuck, Beau's eldest son
- Jamie Martin Mann as Brody, Beau's 15-year-old son
- Griffin McIntyre as Dylan, Beau's 12-year-old son
- Shiloh Verrico as Cassidy, Beau's 9-year-old daughter
- Pyper Braun as Chloe, Beau's 6-year-old daughter and the youngest of Beau's children

=== Recurring ===
- Janet Varney as Summer, Beau's girlfriend
- Eric Balfour as Boone, Bailey's ex-boyfriend

=== Notable guest star ===
- LeAnn Rimes as herself

== Episodes ==
No.	Title	Directed by	Written by	Original release date
1	"Crazy"	Kelly Park	Caryn Lucas	March 19, 2021
The country singer Bailey who has a problem with her car on her aimless way, knocks on a door of a family with a farm to get some help but instead she quickly becomes their tenth nanny without having any experiences. The 5 kids and their father Beau lost their mother and wife 2 years ago, that's why they need her. Beau has a new girlfriend, Summer, who seems to be jealous of the beauty of Bailey and wants her to go again but doesn't really say it out loud directly. When a storm is coming they get in the cellar where Bailey starts to tell the story of how her singing partner and boyfriend left her for another singing partner. When the storm gets worse they start to sing but Bailey took the old guitar of the mother which makes Cassidy, one of the daughters of Beau, really sad and she goes out into the storm in the barn. Bailey follows her and helps her back while risking her life because the barn breaks. At the end of the episode, although Cassidy didn't like Bailey at first, she now loves her and Bailey becomes the official nanny.
2	"Teardrops on My Guitar"	Kelly Park	Caryn Lucas	March 19, 2021
3	"Sign, Sign, Everywhere a Sign"	David Kendall	Caryn Lucas	March 19, 2021
4	"My Girl"	Kelly Park	Caryn Lucas	March 19, 2021
5	"Blue"	Kelly Park	Peter Marc Jacobson	March 19, 2021
6	"Summer Lovin'"	Kelly Park	Ron Rappaport	March 19, 2021
7	"You're Nobody Till Somebody Loves You"	Leslie Kolins Small	Julia Fowler	March 19, 2021
8	"Back in the Saddle Again"	Leslie Kolins Small	Ron Rappaport	March 19, 2021
9	"You Matter to Me"	David Kendall	Peter Marc Jacobson	March 19, 2021
10	"Bless the Broken Road"	Kelly Park	Caryn Lucas	March 19, 2021

== Production ==
=== Development ===
On January 30, 2020, Netflix gave Country Comfort a series order consisting of ten episodes. The series is created and executive produced by Caryn Lucas. On July 2, 2021, Netflix canceled the series after one season.

=== Casting ===
Upon series order announcement, Katharine McPhee, Eddie Cibrian, Ricardo Hurtado, Jamie Martin Mann, Pyper Braun, Shiloh Verrico, and Griffin McIntyre were cast to star. On February 12, 2020, Eric Balfour and Janet Varney joined the cast in recurring roles.

=== Filming ===
The series was filmed at Sunset Bronson Studios in Hollywood, California, but it is set in Nashville, Tennessee.

== Release ==
The series premiered on March 19, 2021.

== Reception ==
=== Critical response ===
The review aggregator website Rotten Tomatoes reported an approval rating of 50% based on 6 critic reviews, with an average rating of 5.67/10.

=== Accolades ===
The series won Outstanding Cinematography For A Multi-Camera Series for the "Crazy" episode with George Mooradian as the cinematographer at the Primetime Emmy Awards.
