= Jama Williamson =

American actress (born 1974)

- Born: March 12, 1974 (age 52); Evansville, Indiana, United States
- Occupation: Actress
- Years active: 1998–present
- Spouse: Curtis Mark Williams (m. 2006)
- Children: 2

Jama Williamson (born March 12, 1974) is an American actress. She was active in New York City theater throughout the early 2000s, during which she appeared in such shows as Avery Crozier's Eat the Runt, Hunt Holman's Spanish Girl, A. R. Gurney's Sylvia and Simon Mendes da Costa's Losing Louis. She also appeared in Debbie Does Dallas: The Musical, an off-Broadway musical adaptation of the pornographic film Debbie Does Dallas, and she is featured in the show's original cast recording.

Williamson, who was born in Evansville, Indiana, has appeared in such shows as Law & Order, Numb3rs and Chappelle's Show, and her voice was featured in the 2004 video game Grand Theft Auto: San Andreas. In 2005, Williamson was cast as the wife of James Van Der Beek in the CBS sitcom pilot Three, which was ultimately not picked up. Since 2009, she has made regular guest appearances on the NBC comedy series Parks and Recreation as Wendy Haverford, the ex-wife of regular character Tom Haverford, played by Aziz Ansari. She also starred as Principal Mullins on the Nickelodeon series School of Rock.

== Career ==
=== Theater ===
Williamson was active in New York City theater throughout the early 2000s, during which time she was represented by the Paradigm Talent Agency.

In 2000, she appeared in Eat the Runt, a comedy by Avery Crozier about a job applicant's series of bizarre interviews at an art museum. During this production, by Mefisto Theater Company at Altered Stages, the actors had to be prepared to play every role in the play and, before each show, the audience drew tickets which determined what actors play which characters. The New York Times reviewer Lawrence Van Gelder said the gimmick was novel, but in the end, "the cast has probably had more sustained fun than the audience".

In the summer of 2001, Williamson again appeared in Eat the Runt at The American Place Theatre, this time without the constant role switching. She played a second applicant trying to get the museum job, who claims the protagonist is actually her scorned love interest who is only pretending to seek the job in order to hurt her chances.

In the summer of 2002, she appeared in an Off Broadway production of Hunt Holman's Spanish Girl at the Second Stage Theatre. The show was about a college student who had a summer fling relationship with a 15-year-old girl, then tries to end it. Williamson played Jolene, the strong-willed college girlfriend of the protagonist, who does not know about his affair. New York Daily News writer Robert Dominguez praised her "strong performance". Marjorie Gunner of New York Voice called Williamson a scene-stealer, and said she played the role "like the center of gravity".

Williamson appeared in Debbie Does Dallas: The Musical, the Off Broadway stage musical adaption of the 1978 pornographic film Debbie Does Dallas, which was shown at the Jane Street Theater starting October 2002. She played Roberta, one of Debbie's attractive young friends who perform sexual services for money. Williamson, along with other female members of the cast, was praised by The New York Times theater critic Bruce Weber as "for lack of a better word, adorable", and appeared to be "having great fun while they wait for better jobs". During the show, she performed a sexually themed duet called "Make That Candle Work for You", in which Roberta and her boss sing at the candle store where Roberta works. During the song, girls dance with candles shaped like erect penises. The song was sung by Williamson in the Debbie Does Dallas Original Cast Recording, which was released on compact disc in 2003. Her singing voice, along with those of the rest of the cast, was praised in a Los Angeles Times review.

From October to November 2003, Williamson played the title role in Sylvia, a comedy by A. R. Gurney, at Playhouse on the Green in Bridgeport, Connecticut. The show was about a dog (played by a human) named Sylvia who is adopted by a couple, which creates drama in their relationship. Irene Backalenick of the Connecticut Post said of Williamson's performance, "Jama Williamson is just not doggy enough, playing it more like a petulant teen-ager. She is really convincing as Sylvia the dog only when she lies down, putting her chin on Greg's knee."

Starting in October 2006, Williamson played Bella Holland, the office assistant and mistress of a married man, in a production of Simon Mendes da Costa's play Losing Louis, which played at the Manhattan Theatre Club. The show opened with a controversial scene in which the protagonist performs oral sex on Williamson's character while his six-year-old son hides under the bed. The show received largely negative reviews, Williamson herself received mixed critiques. The New York Times writer Charles Isherwood said Williamson was one of the stronger cast members, but added, "the actors cannot do much to freshen the coarse innuendoes or breathe life into the plot contrivances". Elysa Gardner, of USA Today, said Williamson added "dynamic support" to the show. North Jersey Media Group critic Robert Feldberg, who was critical of the show, said her performance was amateurish and reminded him of "middling community theater." However, Feldberg said other more experienced actors were similarly bad in the show, so Williamson's faults can be blamed in part on the director. Backstage said Williamson and other cast members "fail to register in any credible way".

=== Television ===
Williamson has appeared in several television shows, including the NBC legal drama Law & Order and the Comedy Central sketch comedy series Chappelle's Show, starring Dave Chappelle. She also appeared as a jogger in the 2005 independent comedy drama film Duane Hopwood, and provided voices for pedestrian characters in the 2004 video game Grand Theft Auto: San Andreas.

Starting in the mid-2000s, Williamson began appearing more frequently in television. In 2005, Williamson was cast as one of the three leads in a CBS Paramount Network Television pilot for the sitcom Three, in which she played Annie, the wife of a character played by James Van Der Beek. The show revolved around the happily married couple and their recently divorced male friend, played by Zachary Levi. The pilot was never sold.

In early 2007, Williamson gave an appearance in a pilot episode of the sitcom Rules of Engagement. Although the series was picked up by CBS, the episode featuring Williamson never aired.

Williamson appeared in "Democracy", a third season episode of the CBS drama series Numb3rs, which originally aired on March 9, 2007. In the episode, she played Jane Aliano, a woman who gets kidnapped as the result of a voter fraud conspiracy that led to a series of murders throughout the episode.

Starting in May 2009, Williamson began making regular appearances in the NBC comedy series Parks and Recreation as Wendy Haverford, the wife of regular character Tom Haverford, played by Aziz Ansari. Wendy is an attractive and well-liked surgeon, and many in the show wonder why she is interested in the sarcastic and overeager Tom. It is eventually revealed the two characters have a green card marriage to prevent Wendy from being deported to Canada. Williamson first appeared in the first season finale "Rock Show", but made regular appearances throughout the second season. Wendy and Tom amicably separate after the December 2009 episode "Tom's Divorce", but she continued to make appearances afterward.

Williamson portrayed Nora, the mother of Loren Tate (Brittany Underwood), on the 2012 TeenNick series Hollywood Heights. In 2016, she played the recurring role of Principal Mullins on the Nickelodeon comedy series School of Rock; her role was upped to series regular for the series' second season.

Williamson had a recurring role on NBC's The Good Place (2016–2020), playing Val, one of the demons working for Shawn in "The Bad Place".

== Filmography ==
=== Film ===
Year	Title	Role	Notes
1998	The Dry Season	Odd Girl Blind Date	
2001	Mergers & Acquisitions	Missy	
2005	Duane Hopwood	Jogger #1	
2015	I Am Potential	Patricia Hughes	

=== Television ===
Year	Title	Role	Notes
2003	Guiding Light	Joanie	Episode: "#1.14113"
2003	Chappelle's Show	Girl Waiting in Line	Episode: "#1.11"
2005	Three	Annie	Episode: "Pilot"
2005	Law & Order	Tina	Episode: "Mammon”
2007	Numb3rs	Jane Aliano	Episode: "Democracy"
2009–11	Parks and Recreation	Wendy Haverford	11 episodes
2010	Weeds	Allison	2 episodes
2012	Hollywood Heights	Nora Tate	80 episodes
2012	30 Second Star	Herself	Episode: "Jama Williamson, Zibby Allen"
2013	Private Practice	Darlene Meyer	Episode: "Full Release"
2014	Rake	Stacy	4 episodes
2014	CSI: Crime Scene Investigation	Dina Bryant	Episode: "Buzz Kill"
2014	The Millers	Kate	Episode: "Papa Was a Rolling Bone"
2014	The Mentalist	Denise Cortez	Episode: "The Silver Briefcase"
2015	About a Boy	Emma	Episode: "About a Prostitute"
2015	Mad Men	Libby Blum	Episode: "Lost Horizon"
2015	Ellen More or Less	Melissa	Television movie
2016	NCIS	Angelina Jennings	Episode: "Reasonable Doubts"
2016–18	School of Rock	Principal Mullins	33 episodes
2017	Brooklyn Nine-Nine	Rachel	Episode: "The Audit"
2017–19	The Good Place	Val	8 episodes
2017	Marlon	Vickie	Episode: "Coach Marlon"
2018	New Girl	Miss Carly	Episode: "Lily Pads"
2019	The Selection	Val	Spin-off of The Good Place; 6 episodes
2019–2020	Single Parents	Tracy Freeze	11 episodes
2020	Deputy	Therapist	Episode: "10-8 Selfless"
2020	Borrasca	Lisbeth Walker	5 episodes
2021	Sydney to the Max	Ms. Anderson	Episode: "Do the Write Thing"
2024	American Rust	Lucy	4 episodes
2024–2025	Law & Order: Special Victims Unit	Laura Hughes	2 episodes
2024	A Man on the Inside	Beatrice	4 episodes

=== Video games ===
Year	Title	Role	Notes
2004	Grand Theft Auto: San Andreas	Pedestrian	Uncredited
