= Erin & Aaron =

American comedy television series

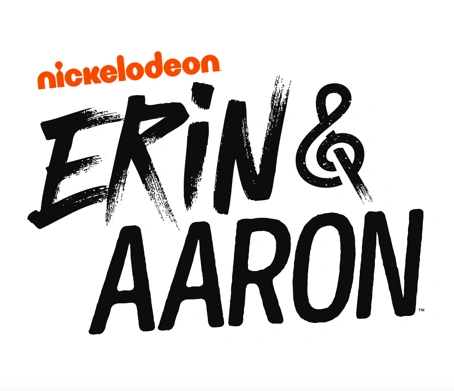
- Genre: Comedy
- Created by: Dicky Murphy
- Starring: Ava Ro; Jensen Gering; Pyper Braun; David S. Jung; Larisa Oleynik
- Theme music composer: Chris Sernel; Jeff Lewis
- Opening theme: "More Than Family" performed by Ava Ro and Jensen Gering
- Composer: Chris Alan Lee
- Country of origin: United States
- Original language: English
- No. of seasons: 1
- No. of episodes: 12

Production
- Executive producers: Dicky Murphy; Sean Cunningham; Marc Dworkin
- Producer: Patty Gary-Cox
- Camera setup: Multi-camera
- Running time: 22 minutes
- Production companies: Tom the Spider, Inc.; Dworkingham Productions; Nickelodeon Productions

Original release
- Network: Nickelodeon
- Release: April 20 – June 29, 2023

Erin & Aaron is an American comedy television series created by Dicky Murphy that aired on Nickelodeon from April 20 to June 29, 2023. The series stars Ava Ro, Jensen Gering, Pyper Braun, David S. Jung, and Larisa Oleynik.

== Premise ==
Set in Asbury Park, New Jersey, teenage stepsiblings with similar sounding names, Erin and Aaron, are forced to learn to live together when Erin's father Chuck marries Aaron's mother Sylvia. Aaron has a little sister named Natasha. On the other hand, Erin grew up as an only child and has trouble sharing which causes friction between her and her new stepbrother. While Erin is strong-willed and impulsive, Aaron is calm and sensitive. Despite their differences, the stepsiblings have a shared passion for music. They start writing and playing music together which helps them navigate the challenges of becoming a blended family.

== Cast ==
=== Main ===
- Ava Ro as Erin Park, Aaron's stepsister who plays guitar. She has a wild streak and is not afraid to speak her mind
- Jensen Gering as Aaron Williams, Erin's stepbrother who plays piano. He is sensitive, hardworking and wants to become a pop star
- Pyper Braun as Natasha Williams, Aaron's younger sister and Erin's younger stepsister. She is physically strong and quite manipulative
- David S. Jung as Chuck Park, Erin's father and Aaron's stepfather
- Larisa Oleynik as Sylvia Williams-Park, Aaron's mother and Erin's stepmother

=== Recurring ===
- Celia Méndez as Vivian, Erin's best friend who has a crush on Aaron
- Luca Diaz as Hunter, Erin and Aaron's next-door neighbor who has a crush on Erin

== Production ==
On April 8, 2020, it was announced that Nickelodeon ordered a pilot for Erin and Aaron, a musical sibling comedy television series created by Dicky Murphy. Murphy, Sean Cunningham, and Marc Dworkin serve as executive producers. On March 4, 2023, it was announced that Larisa Oleynik as Sylvia, David S. Jung as Chuck, and Pyper Braun as Natasha all joined Ava Ro as Erin and Jensen Gering as Aaron in the main cast, and that the show would premiere on April 20, 2023. On March 22, 2024, it was reported that the series was canceled after one season.

== Episodes ==
No.	Title	Directed by	Written by	Original release date	Prod. code	U.S. viewers (millions)
1	"We Are Family"	Wendy Faraone	Dicky Murphy	April 20, 2023	101	0.11
Erin and her father, Chuck welcome Chuck's new wife, Sylvia and her children, Aaron and Natasha. Both Erin and Aaron share a love for music. So, to help them get along, their parents set up a music room for them. However, when Erin loses her talent show spot to Aaron, it sparks a war between the stepsiblings which ends with her pushing Aaron and his piano down the stairs. They finally admit that they are unhappy with the new blended family. This upsets their parents and Natasha who had successfully manipulated them into getting a mini-horse. Seeing their parents unhappy, Erin and Aaron agree to share the music spot at the talent show. Finding that they lost their spot to the cheerleaders, Erin tricks them to leave but the cheerleaders return and attack them on stage. Erin, Aaron and their friends, Vivian and Hunter are overpowered by the cheerleaders but Natasha jumps on stage and beats them up. Erin and Aaron are able to perform their first song together. They officially become a family. Featured song: "Keep Singin' It" Guest stars: Celia Méndez, Luca Diaz, Sophia Stephens
2	"Piano Man"	Wendy Faraone	Sean W. Cunningham & Marc Dworkin	April 20, 2023	102	0.11
Aaron holds a funeral for his piano that Erin destroyed by pushing it down the stairs in the previous episode. Erin finds a similar piano on sale but the store is run by Mr. Ledder, her former music teacher who holds a grudge against her for smashing her violin during a recital in elementary school. Ledder accuses her of being an instrument killer and refuses to sell to them. To convince him, the stepsiblings advertise the store wearing embarrassing costumes, but when Aaron trips and destroys some instruments, Ledder bans them both. Feeling guilty for destroying her stepbrother's dreams, Erin devises a plan to sneak into the store in disguises. While their friends, Vivian and Hunter distract the security, Erin and Aaron perform a song that convinces Ledder they are true musicians. He allows them to buy the piano. Meanwhile, after being forced to help train her new mini-horse, Natasha takes advantage of the training technique to control her parents and manipulate them into doing whatever she wants. Featured song: "Unstoppable" Guest stars: Celia Méndez, Luca Diaz, Jared Gertner
3	"Un-break My Heart"	Wendy Faraone	Samantha Martin	April 27, 2023	104	0.16
Aaron tells Erin that he wants a girl to break his heart so that he can channel those feelings into writing a hit breakup song. He accidentally asks out Erin's friend, Vivian who already has an obsessive crush on him. Worried that Vivian will be heartbroken when she finds out that Aaron wasn't looking for a real girlfriend, Erin engineers a plan to get Vivian to break up with Aaron first. However, it fails and Vivian is upset with Erin for hiding the truth. Feeling guilty for breaking up Erin and Vivian, Aaron writes them a heartfelt friendship song as an apology. The girls make up. Meanwhile, Natasha starts selling illegal German cheese snacks called Das Cheezers. Declaring herself a girlboss, she manipulates her parents into doing her art project. When she gets a B+, Chuck and Sylvia invite Natasha's teacher to convince her that it deserves better. Mrs. Nelson threatens to give Natasha an F for not doing her own project, but she bribes her with Das Cheezers. Featured song: "I'll Be Your Friend" Guest stars: Celia Méndez, Cyrina Fiallo
4	"Music for a Sushi Restaurant"	Evelyn Belasco	Dicky Murphy	May 4, 2023	103	0.10
Guest stars: Celia Méndez, Luca Diaz
5	"Somebody's Watching Me"	Evelyn Belasco	Scott Taylor & Wesley Jermaine Johnson	May 11, 2023	105	N/A
Guest star: Luca Diaz
6	"Born in the U.S.A."	Mike Caron	Nora Sullivan	May 18, 2023	106	0.13
Guest stars: Celia Méndez, Luca Diaz, Sophia Stephens
7	"Gone Country"	David Kendall	Samantha Martin	May 25, 2023	107	0.16
Guest stars: Celia Méndez, Luca Diaz, Jamie Kaler
8	"Lose Yourself"	Adam Weissman	Scott Taylor & Wesley Jermaine Johnson	June 1, 2023	108	0.11
Featured song: "It's You" Guest stars: Celia Méndez, Luca Diaz, Brandon Severs, Cody Veith, Seph Alan, Anna LaMadrid
9	"I Want You Back"	Leonard R. Garner Jr.	Shukri R. Abdi	June 8, 2023	109	0.10
Guest stars: Celia Méndez, Luca Diaz, Lela Hoffmeister
10	"Pictures of You"	Robbie Countryman	Conor Hanney	June 15, 2023	111	0.12
Guest stars: Luca Diaz, Michael D. Cohen
11	"Bad Romance"	Jody Margolin Hahn	Hannah Suria	June 22, 2023	110	0.10
Guest stars: Celia Méndez, Luca Diaz, Asante Boe, Pressley Hosbach
12	"Should I Stay or Should I Go"	Trevor Kirschner	Sean W. Cunningham & Marc Dworkin and Dicky Murphy	June 29, 2023	001	0.09
Featured songs: "Phenomenal", "I Already Knew It" Guest stars: Jack Griffo, Celia Méndez, Luca Diaz, Jessica Marie Garcia, Eric Petersen

== Ratings ==
Viewership and ratings per season of Erin & Aaron
Season	Episodes	First aired		Last aired		Avg. viewers (millions)
Season	Episodes	Date	Viewers (millions)	Date	Viewers (millions)	Avg. viewers (millions)
1	11	April 20, 2023	0.11	June 29, 2023	0.09	0.12
