= All I Want for Christmas Is You (film) =

2017 American film

- DVD cover
- Directed by: Guy Vasilovich
- Screenplay by: Temple Mathews
- Based on: All I Want for Christmas Is You by Mariah Carey; "All I Want for Christmas Is You" by; Mariah Carey; Walter Afanasieff
- Produced by: Steven Rosen; Mike Young; Liz Young
- Starring: Mariah Carey; Breanna Yde; Henry Winkler
- Edited by: Richard Finn
- Music by: Richard Evans; Matthew Gerrard; Marco Luciani
- Production companies: Splash Entertainment; Magic Carpet Productions; Universal Animation Studios; Universal 1440 Entertainment
- Distributed by: Universal Pictures Home Entertainment
- Release date: November 14, 2017
- Running time: 91 minutes
- Country: United States
- Language: English

All I Want for Christmas Is You (also known as Mariah Carey's All I Want for Christmas Is You) is a 2017 American animated Christmas comedy film based on the song of the same name by Mariah Carey and the book by Carey herself. The film stars the voices of Mariah Carey, Breanna Yde, and Henry Winkler.

== Plot ==
A young Mariah Carey has wanted a dog her entire life, but isn't allowed to have one due to her father's allergy and partly due to her mother's cleanliness. A few days before Christmas, her grandma takes her to the pet store and she sees a hypoallergenic poodle, who she names Princess and immediately falls in love with. She tries to convince her dad to let her have the dog for Christmas, to which he agrees, but only if she proves she's responsible enough to own one.

He brings home a scruffy Jack Russell Terrier named Jack, who he says is owned by his brother Reggie. Jack proves to be more problematic than anticipated: He runs out of the house and refuses to come back in, but Mariah manages to lure him back inside with a steak. While she picks up his poop, Jack gets frightened by the gear she's wearing and pees in the hallway. When she tries to take him on a walk, he breaks loose of his leash, runs through the town park, and knocks over Mariah's principal. Mariah tries to convince her she's not his owner, but her principal scolds her for lying. At her choir concert, Jack barks along with the music so loudly he causes some snow on the pavilion to fall onto the choir members. When she tries to deliver some toys too a donation box, Jack refuses to let them go due to having grown an attachment to them. Mariah tries to yank him out and accidentally knocks over some Christmas decorations.

While preparing for a dog show, Jack rips her Santa suit, causing her to have an emotional breakdown. Her sister helps her come up with a plan to borrow the suit off the Mrs. Claus animatronic from the yard of their neighbors, the Ingersols. Everything goes smoothly at the dog show until Jack vomits in front of everyone.

Mariah's grandfather Bill, annoyed that he can't put up lots of decorations like the Ingersols, constantly sabotages their display. One night, while trying to replace one of the blinking bulbs with a non-blinking one, he falls off the roof and gets tangled up in the lights. Mariah and her brother sneak over and help him land safely on a reindeer decoration whilst just barely avoiding detection.

On the night before Christmas Eve, two squirrels crawl in through the chimney and start playing with the decorations Mariah's family has set up. Jack chases them around, unintentionally creating a mess. The family comes downstairs to see the commotion, and Mariah angrily reprimands Jack for all his misbehavior. Feeling dejected, Jack runs under the couch and later out of the house. Mariah's grandma reminds her that Jack's only a puppy, and Mariah tries to apologize to him before going back to bed.

The next morning, Mariah is worried about how uncle Reggie will react now that Jack is gone. Her father then reveals that Jack was actually just a stray Reggie found and he gave him to her to see if she would change her mind about having a dog. After everyone voices their disapproval, he apologizes and offers to take her to go get Princess. At the pet store, another kid is having fun with Princess but is saddened when he finds out that Mariah had put tabs on her. Feeling sorry for the kid, she lets him have Princess and realizes just how much she cares for Jack. Her and her family organize a search party. Mariah decides to look in the donation box and finds Jack with the toys she donated.

During the night of Christmas Day, the family chases the pair of squirrels around the yard, and it's revealed that her father is actually allergic to the squirrels rather than dogs. Bill, finally having been allowed to decorate the outside of the house to his hearts content, has made a very bright display, which ends up temporarily blinding Mr. Ingersol. While all this is happening, Jack helps himself to the family's roast.

== Cast ==
- Mariah Carey as herself / narrator
  - Breanna Yde as Little Mariah
- Henry Winkler as Grandpa Bill
- Phil Morris as Bud
- Lacey Chabert as Penelope
- Charlie Adler as:
  - Santa Claus
  - Mr. Ingersoll
  - Dougie's Dad
- Laya DeLeon Hayes as Vicky
- Montse Hernandez as Grace
- Issac Ryan Brown as Brett
- Bria D. Singleton as Beth
- Rachel Eggleston as Holly
- Julian Zane as Ernesto
- Karim Saleh as Mr. Tyabji
- Connie Jackson as Grandma Lucy
- Keiko Agena as Emiko
- Dee Bradley Baker as Jack
- Ali Eagle as Mrs. Alexander
- Michelle C. Bonilla as Principal Reyes
- Monroe Cannon as Michelle
- Moroccan Cannon as Dougie

== Background ==
In early 2015, Carey signed with Epic Records and began work on a Christmas themed animated film, pitching the idea to her friend, Brett Ratner. By April, New Line Cinema bought the rights to Carey's film idea from RatPac Entertainment. Carey was set to star in the film and curate the film's soundtrack.

=== All I Want for Christmas Is You ===
In 2015, Carey announced a children's book titled All I Want for Christmas Is You based on her 1994 hit song of the same name. The book told the story of a young girl whose greatest holiday wish is for a new puppy. The book was published by Random House's Doubleday Books for Young Readers and illustrated by Colleen Madden. The book was released on November 10 the same year.

== Production ==
By March 2017, production of the animated film Mariah Carey's All I Want for Christmas Is You began. Lacey Chabert, Henry Winkler and Breanna Yde were attached to the film. Carey was executive producer of the film alongside Stella Bulochnikov for Magic Carpet Productions, in partnership with producer Mike Young and Splash Entertainment.

The film is based on Carey's 2015 book of the same name which had sold over 750,000 copies by 2017.

== Release ==
The film was released direct-to-video on November 14, 2017, on Blu-ray, DVD, iTunes and other various digital platforms.

== Soundtrack ==
Mariah Carey's All I Want For Christmas Is You (Original Motion Picture Soundtrack) was released as the soundtrack alongside the release of the film. It features Christmas covers and classics by Carey and two of the voice cast members, as well as a brand new song by Carey called "Lil Snowman". In Japan, it was released on November 22 of the same year.

=== Track listing ===
Credits adapted from Spotify.

No.	Title	Writer(s)	Producer(s)	Length
1.	"All I Want for Christmas Is You" (Breanna Yde)	Mariah Carey; Walter Afanasieff	Carey; Matthew Gerrard	4:03
2.	"Lil Snowman" (Mariah Carey)	Carey; Harvey Mason, Jr.; Johnny Marks; Marvin Brodie	Carey; Mason, Jr.	3:19
3.	"Christmas Time Is in the Air Again" (Mariah Carey)	Carey; Mark Shaiman	Carey; Shaiman	3:02
4.	"Wild & Crazy Christmas" (Issac Ryan Brown)	Gerrard; Peter Amato	Gerrard; Amato	3:09
5.	"Miss You Most (At Christmas Time)" (Mariah Carey)	Carey; Afanasieff	Carey; Afanasieff	4:33
6.	"All I Want for Christmas Is You" (Mariah Carey)	Carey; Afanasieff	Carey; Afanasieff	4:02
7.	"Mariah's Christmas Theme" (Richard Evans, Matthew Gerrard & Marco Luciani)	Richard Evans; Gerrard; Marco Luciani	Evans; Gerrard; Luciani	4:08
8.	"Jack's Suite" (Richard Evans, Matthew Gerrard & Marco Luciani)	Evans; Gerrard; Luciani	Evans; Gerrard; Luciani	3:14
9.	"Mariah and Jack Medley" (Richard Evans, Matthew Gerrard & Marco Luciani)	Evans; Gerrard; Luciani	Evans; Gerrard; Luciani	3:25
Total length:				32:58

== See also ==
- List of Christmas films
