= Growing Up Fisher =

Television series

- Genre: Sitcom
- Created by: D. J. Nash
- Starring: J. K. Simmons; Eli Baker; Ava Deluca-Verley; Lance Lim; Jenna Elfman
- Narrated by: Jason Bateman
- Opening theme: "Tell The World" performed by Eric Hutchinson
- Composer: Mateo Messina
- Country of origin: United States
- Original language: English
- No. of seasons: 1
- No. of episodes: 13

Production
- Executive producers: D. J. Nash; Jason Bateman; David Schwimmer; Jim Garavente; Tucker Cawley
- Camera setup: Single-camera
- Running time: 22 minutes
- Production companies: Next Thing You Know Productions; Aggregate Films; Universal Television

Original release
- Network: NBC
- Release: February 23 – June 11, 2014

Growing Up Fisher is an American sitcom that began airing mid-season on NBC as part of the 2013–14 United States network television schedule. The semi-autobiographical single camera series was created by D. J. Nash.

On January 10, 2014, NBC announced that Growing Up Fisher would premiere following the 2014 Olympics on Sunday, February 23, 2014, at 10:30 pm, and then move to its regular timeslot on Tuesday, March 4, at 9:30 pm following About a Boy.

On May 9, 2014, NBC canceled Growing Up Fisher after one season.

== Plot ==
The family of 11-year-old Henry (Eli Baker) begins to function after the divorce of blind father and lawyer Mel (J.K. Simmons) and mother Joyce (Jenna Elfman). The series follows everyday situations the family goes through, often involving Henry's sister Katie (Ava Deluca-Verley) and normal situations the parents handle, usually in a comical way.

== Cast ==
=== Main ===
- J. K. Simmons as Mel Fisher
- Eli Baker as Henry Fisher
- Ava Deluca-Verley as Katie Fisher
- Lance Lim as Runyen
- Jenna Elfman as Joyce Fisher
- Jason Bateman (voice only) as Future Henry Fisher

=== Recurring ===
- Isabela Moner as Jenny
- Matthew Glave as Principal Sloan
- Carla Jimenez as Janice

== Development and production ==
The series first appeared on the development slate at NBC in October 2012 under the title ...Then Came Elvis. The network placed a pilot order in January 2013. The pilot episode was written by D. J. Nash, and directed by David Schwimmer.

Casting announcements began in February 2013, with Parker Posey first cast in the role of Joyce Fisher, Henry's mother who attempts to reclaim her youth, post-divorce. J.K. Simmons was the second actor cast, in the series regular role of the blind family patriarch, Mel Fisher. Shortly after, Eli Baker and Ava Deluca-Verley were then added to the cast, with Baker cast in the lead role of Henry Fisher and Deluca-Verley to the role of Katie Fisher, Henry's older sister, who Joyce desperately wants to be close to.

In May 2013, NBC placed a series order for the comedy under the new title The Family Guide, and in June, it underwent another name change to Growing Up Fisher. In July 2013, Jenna Elfman replaced Parker Posey in the role of Joyce Fisher.

== Episodes ==
No.	Title	Directed by	Written by	Original release date	Viewers (millions)
1	"Pilot"	David Schwimmer	D. J. Nash	February 23, 2014	8.86
When Henry's parents separate, he's upset to learn that he is losing his job as his blind father's helper to a dog; Joyce uses her new freedom to start acting like a teen, while teenage daughter Katie takes on a maternal role.
2	"Blind Man's Bluff"	Eric Appel	Emily Cutler	March 4, 2014	6.91
The arrival of the new guide dog forces Mel to reveal he is blind to a client; when Henry borrows the dog, a pretty girl thinks he is blind; when Joyce's study partner validates her as cool, Katie starts to see her differently.
3	"The Date From Hell-Nado"	Michael Patrick Jann	D. J. Nash	March 11, 2014	6.33
Mel and Henry encourage each other to pursue women in their building; Joyce panics during her first post-separation date and crashes her daughter's date at a carnival.
4	"Trust Fall"	Michael Patrick Jann	Mathew Harawitz	March 18, 2014	6.60
Mel and Joyce have difficulty agreeing on how to discipline Katie; needing a break from family drama, Henry makes Runyen let him sleep over.
5	"Work With Me"	Eric Appel	Laura Chinn	March 25, 2014	6.24
Joyce lands a job at Mel's law firm and ends up getting into a feud with his secretary; Katie tries to help Henry play it cool around Jenny.
6	"Drug/Bust"	Fred Savage	Tucker Cawley	April 1, 2014	5.96
Mel freaks out when he finds marijuana in Katie's bag -- only to discover that Joyce put it there; Henry worries that he will lose his sight.
7	"Katie You Can Drive My Car"	Linda Mendoza	Adam Barr	April 8, 2014	5.54
When Katie gets her driver's license, Mel makes excuses to ride in the car with her; Joyce tries to fit in with her classmates.
8	"The Man With the Spider Tattoo"	Henry Chan	Story by : Amelie Gillette & Spencer Sloan; Teleplay by : Amelie Gillette	April 15, 2014	5.89
Mel needs to find a plus-one for an important charity event; Katie tries to assist her dad so the secret party she is planning at his apartment won't be jeopardized; Joyce defends her family's honour.
9	"Desk/Job"	Eric Appel	David Holden	April 22, 2014	5.83
Mel fears Henry is becoming a slacker and tries to show him what success looks like; Katie and Joyce decide they should stand up for themselves.
10	"First Time's the Charm"	Michael Blieden	Emily Cutler & Giuseppe Graziano	April 29, 2014	5.59
Joyce discovers that Katie has big plans with her boyfriend after the spring formal; despite being unable to cook, Mel promises to make dinner for Allison (Constance Zimmer).
11	"Secret Lives of Fishers"	Linda Mendoza	Tucker Cawley & Laura Chinn	May 6, 2014	5.05
Mel sneaks into Joyce's house to take bubble baths; Joyce panics over her success at school; Katie gets a secret job; Runyen helps Henry prepare to fight a bully.
12	"Madi About You"	Dean Holland	Mathew Harawitz & Amelie Gillette	June 11, 2014	4.04
Mel tries to prove a point to Joyce's sister, Madi (Erinn Hayes); Henry worries that he and Jenny have fallen into the "friend zone."
13	"Growing Up Fairbanks"	Matt Sohn	D. J. Nash & David Holden	June 11, 2014	3.58
As the divorce is about to become final, Mel is determined to maintain normalcy; Henry must overcome his fear of horses.

== Reception and cancellation ==
Initially sporting good ratings, viewership declined over the course of the season, ending with a 1.2 share (about five million viewers) when the show was cancelled. Only 2 of NBC's 8 sitcoms were renewed that year. It was unpopular with critics, producing a 35% critic rating on Rotten Tomatoes, although audiences loved it twice as much, producing a 70%.
