= Rivkah Reyes =

- Born: Rebecca Brown; Chicago, Illinois, U.S.
- Occupations: Actress, musician
- Years active: 2003-present
- Notable work: School of Rock

Rivkah Reyes (born Rebecca Brown) is an American actor and singer. They came to prominence when she was cast as the bassist, Katie, in the 2003 movie School of Rock.

== Career ==
Reyes began her career when they were cast as Katie, the bassist in the movie School of Rock. Reyes had never played bass prior to being cast in the movie. Reyes stepped away from acting until 2014, when they were cast in a short film called Cool Nerds. In 2020, Reyes voiced the character Tita Becca in Action Nat and the Cat. Reyes played "Zoe in the movie Monuments. In 2022, Reyes starred as Marlene in Bad Animal alongside Chicago musician Mykele Dyville. In 2021, Reyes played Cait in Alex/October. Reyes was cast as "Mack" in the 2023 film Onyx the Fortuitous and the Talisman of Souls. Reyes wrote, produced and starred in a short film titled Gianna, alongside Jack Black. Reyes was cast in "the 2023 film A Holiday I Do. In 2025, Reyes played a "Drunk Twentysomething" in One of Them Days. Reye's most recent role was as "Sam" in the TV series Too Romantic.

In addition to acting, Reyes is also a musician. In 2026, they released their debut EP titled Fan Favorite. Reyes cites Paramore, Hole, No Doubt, Annie DiRusso, Olivia Rodrigo and The Beaches as influences.
