= School of Rock (TV series) =

American musical-comedy series

- Genre: Musical-comedy
- Based on: School of Rock by Mike White
- Developed by: Jim Armogida & Steve Armogida
- Starring: Breanna Yde; Ricardo Hurtado; Jade Pettyjohn; Lance Lim; Aidan Miner; Tony Cavalero; Jama Williamson
- Theme music composer: Gabriel Mann; Jeannie Lurie; Linus of Hollywood
- Opening theme: "Are You Ready to Rock?"
- Composer: Gabriel Mann
- Country of origin: United States
- Original language: English
- No. of seasons: 3
- No. of episodes: 45 (list of episodes)

Production
- Executive producers: Jim Armogida & Steve Armogida; Jay Kogen; Scott Rudin; Eli Bush; Richard Linklater
- Producers: Harry Hannigan; Chris Phillips
- Camera setup: Multi-camera
- Running time: 21–22 minutes
- Production companies: Armogida Brothers Productions; Passable Entertainment; Paramount Television; Nickelodeon Productions

Original release
- Network: Nickelodeon
- Release: March 12, 2016 – April 8, 2018

School of Rock is an American musical-comedy television series developed by Jim Armogida and Steve Armogida that premiered on Nickelodeon on March 12, 2016. It ran for three seasons, with its final episode airing on April 8, 2018. The series is based on the 2003 film of the same name and stars Breanna Yde, Ricardo Hurtado, Jade Pettyjohn, Lance Lim, Aidan Miner, Tony Cavalero, and Jama Williamson.

== Plot ==
Set in Austin, Texas, the series follows a group of rule-abiding students who learn to take risks and reach new heights thanks to substitute teacher Dewey Finn, a down-on-his-luck musician who uses the language of rock and roll to inspire his class to form a secret band. Throughout the school year, these middle-school classmates find themselves navigating relationships, discovering their unknown talents and learning lessons on loyalty and friendships.

== Episodes ==
Season	Episodes	Originally released	
Season	Episodes	First released	Last released
1	12	March 12, 2016	June 18, 2016
2	13	September 17, 2016	January 28, 2017
3	20	July 8, 2017	April 8, 2018

== Cast and characters ==
=== Main ===
- Breanna Yde as Tomika, a 12-year-old schoolgirl who is best friends with classmate Summer. She plays the electric bass and is also the lead singer in the band.
- Ricardo Hurtado as Freddy, a 12-year-old schoolboy who is considered the most handsome guy in his class and plays the drums in the band. His best friends are classmates Zack and Lawrence. Unbeknownst to him, Summer has a huge crush on him. At the end of the second season, he begins to have feelings for her.
- Jade Pettyjohn as Summer, a 12-year-old schoolgirl who is best friends with Tomika, plays the tambourine in the band, and is also the manager. She has a crush on Freddy.
- Lance Lim as Zack, a 12-year-old schoolboy who is best friends with Lawrence and Freddy. He plays the electric guitar.
- Aidan Miner as Lawrence, a 12-year-old schoolboy who is best friends with Zack and Freddy and is considered the smartest kid in his class. He plays the electronic keyboard.
- Tony Cavalero as Mr. Finn, the new substitute teacher and an ex-rock musician who teaches the kids how to play and work together as a band. In the second season, he is promoted to a regular teacher.
- Jama Williamson as Principal Mullins, the principal of the school. In the first season, she is a recurring character, but is promoted to a main character in the second season.

=== Recurring ===
- Ivan Mallon as Clark
- Brec Bassinger as Kale (seasons 2–3)
- Will Kindrachuk as Asher (seasons 2–3)

== Production ==
In August 2014, Nickelodeon announced a TV series adaptation of School of Rock, and the cast was revealed in March 2015. On April 5, 2016, Nickelodeon announced that School of Rock had been renewed for a 13-episode second season, and actress Breanna Yde announced on her Twitter account that production of season two began April 24, 2016. In April 2016, Jama Williamson was promoted to the regular cast for the series' second season. The second season premiered on Nickelodeon on September 17, 2016. Nickelodeon renewed the series for a 20-episode third season on December 2, 2016. The third season premiered on July 8, 2017. On November 15, 2017, Nickelodeon announced that the third season would be the last. Tony Cavalero reported on social media that the series finale was airing on April 8, 2018. The last episode of the third season, as well as the series, aired on April 8, 2018.

== Ratings ==
Viewership and ratings per season of School of Rock
Season	Episodes	First aired		Last aired		Avg. viewers (millions)
Season	Episodes	Date	Viewers (millions)	Date	Viewers (millions)	Avg. viewers (millions)
1	12	March 12, 2016	2.38	June 18, 2016	1.39	1.49
2	13	September 17, 2016	1.34	January 28, 2017	1.18	1.35
3	20	July 8, 2017	1.03	April 8, 2018	0.67	0.78

== Awards and nominations ==
Year	Award	Category	Result	Ref.
2016	68th Primetime Emmy Awards	Outstanding Children's Program	Nominated	
2017	28th Producers Guild of America Awards	Outstanding Children's Program	Nominated	
2017	69th Primetime Emmy Awards	Outstanding Children's Program	Nominated	
