= Ava Deluca-Verley =

American actress (born 1989)

- Born: September 27, 1989 (age 36)
- Education: Carnegie Mellon University (BFA)
- Occupation: Actress
- Years active: 2012–present
- Website: www.avadelucaverley.com

Ava Deluca-Verley (born September 27, 1989) is an American television and film actress who is best known for her role in NBC's comedy series Growing Up Fisher, playing the daughter of Jenna Elfman and J. K. Simmons's characters. She is of French descent.

== Early life ==
Deluca-Verley spent most of her childhood living with her family in Winchester, Massachusetts. She began her artistic education at the Walnut Hill School in Natick, Massachusetts, before attending college at Carnegie Mellon School of Drama, graduating in 2012. Her father is from France. She has dual citizenship in France, and speaks French fluently.

== Career ==
Deluca-Verley appeared in Oscar-winning screenwriters Jim Rash and Nat Faxon's directorial debut The Way, Way Back starring Steve Carell, Toni Collette and Sam Rockwell, which sold to Fox Searchlight at Sundance Film Festival in 2013. She has guest starred on TNT's Southland, as well as playing a supporting role in Australian feature film, Blinder.

In 2014, she starred alongside Hugo Becker in the PBS three-hour mini series, The Mystery of Matter: Search for Elements, helmed by Emmy Award-winning director Stephen Lyons.

== Filmography ==
Film
Year	Title	Role	Notes
2013	The Way, Way Back	Katy	
2013	Blinder	College Girl	
2019	Ring of Silence	April Sharpe	

Television
Year	Title	Role	Notes
2013	Southland	Rebecca	Episode: "Bleed Out"
2014	Growing Up Fisher	Katie Fisher	Series Regular; 13 episodes
2015	The Mystery of Matter	Marie Anne Lavoisier	Series Regular
2016	Party Girl (Hulu)	Shannon	Series Regular
2019	All Rise	Maia Lambert	Episode: "Long Day's Journey Into ICE"
