= Simon Mendes da Costa =

British playwright

Simon Mendes da Costa is a British playwright. He trained as an actor at the Bristol Old Vic Theatre School between 1989 and 1991. His first play, Table for One, opened at the Hen and Chickens Theatre on 6 November 2001. and he was nominated for 'Most Promising Playwright' at the Evening Standard Awards in 2005.

His play Losing Louis premiered at the Hampstead Theatre, London, on 24 January 2005. It was produced by Michael Codron and starred Alison Steadman and Lynda Bellingham and was directed by Robin Lefevre. Following Hampstead Theatre it transferred immediately to the West End before embarking on a No 1. Southern tour the following year. It also opened on Broadway at the Biltmore Theatre on 12 October 2006, in a different (Americanised) production called Losing Louie, directed by Jerry Zaks.

He was the Literary Associate at the Marlowe Theatre in Canterbury, Kent (2012–2015) where he also ran multiple writing master classes.

His most recent play A Better Woman opened at the Marlowe Theatre on 7 December 2015.
