= Pyper Braun =

American child actress (born 2013)

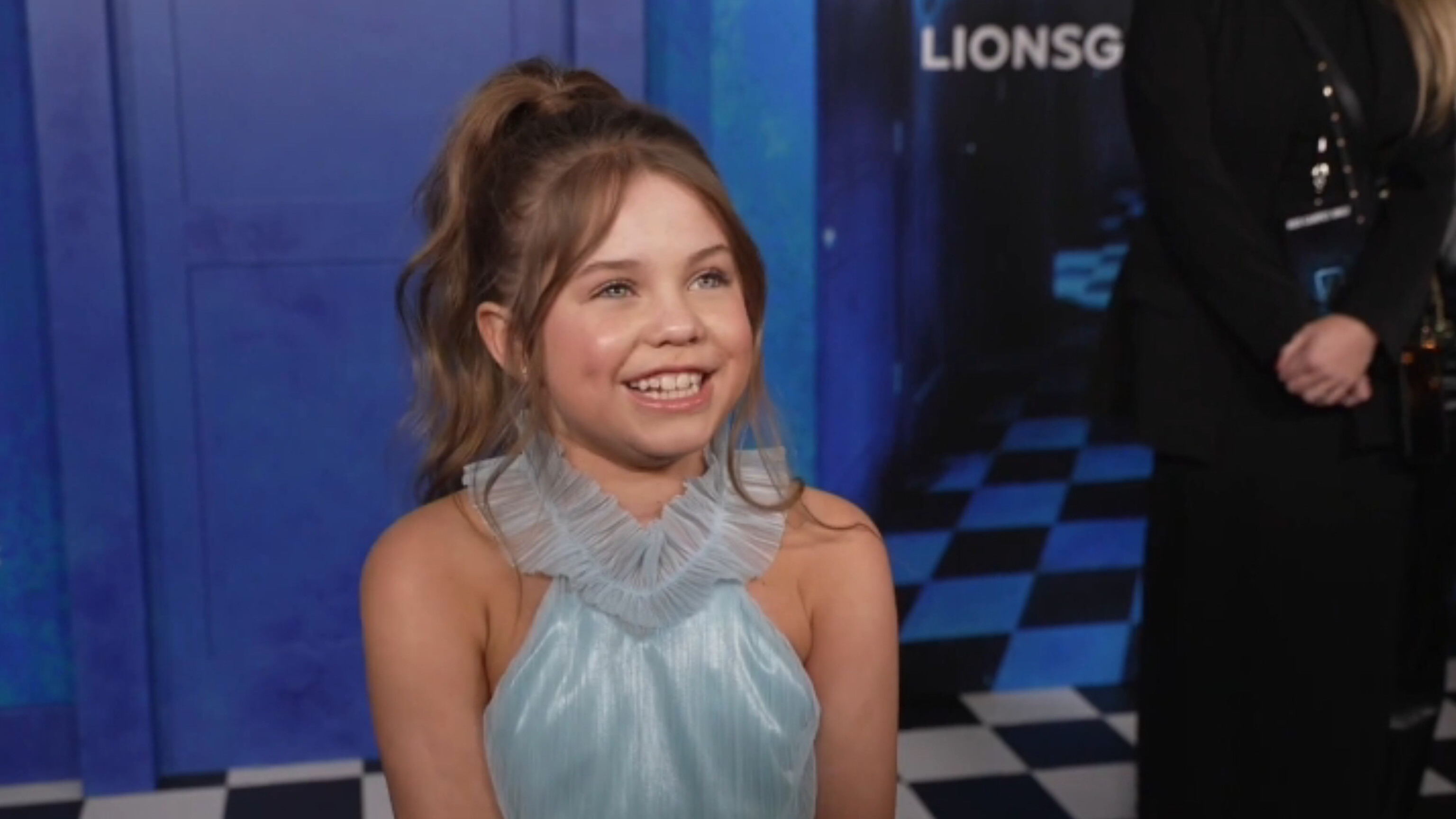
- Braun in 2024
- Born: August 5, 2013 (age 13)
- Occupation: Actress
- Years active: 2016–present

Pyper Braun (born August 5, 2013) is an American actress. She is best known for her roles in Country Comfort (2021) as Chloe Haywood, in Erin & Aaron (2023) as Natasha Williams and in Imaginary (2024) as Alice. She also is known for voicing Bitsy in SuperKitties (2023–present).

== Early life ==
Braun was born on August 5, 2013. She has been in competitive dance since the age of three in 2016.

== Career ==
She began to acting at age of four and at age of six she appeared as body double in Life in Pieces (2019). Braun also appeared in commercials such Disney Junior and Quaker.

Her first acting debut was in the Netflix series Country Comfort (2020) as Chloe Haywood. After minor roles in That Girl Lay Lay (2021–2023) as Brandy Willingham and Raven's Home (2022–2023) as Paige, Braun starred as Natasha Williams in Nickelodeon's series Erin & Aaron (2023), for which she was nominated to a Children's and Family Emmy Awards for Outstanding Younger Performer in a Preschool, Children's or Young Teen Program in 2025. She also appeared in Desperation Road (2023) as Analee.

In 2024, she made her first onscreen debut in Imaginary (2024) as Alice. She also voiced Bitsy in the animated series Superkitties (2023–present).

== Filmography ==
Year	Title	Role	Notes
2019	Life in Pieces	Blonde girl	Episode: "Lost Math Art Glam"
2021	Country Comfort	Chloe Haywood	Main role
2021–2023	That Girl Lay Lay	Brandy Willingham	2 episodes
2022–2023	Raven's Home	Paige	3 episodes
2023	Erin & Aaron	Natasha Williams	Main role
2023	What the Elf?!	Joy	1 episode
2023	Desperation Road	Analee	Film
2023–present	SuperKitties	Bitsy (voice)	Main role
2024	Imaginary	Alice	Film
2025	The Tiny Chef Show	Self	Guest star, segment: "Cinnamon Buns"
2025	The Thundermans: Undercover	Penny Perfect	Episode: "A Midsummer Knight's Scheme"

== Nominations ==
Year	Award	Category	Work	Result	Ref.
2025	Children's and Family Emmy Awards	Outstanding Younger Performer in a Preschool, Children's or Young Teen Program	Erin & Aaron	Nominated	
