= Chris Jenkins (film producer) =

Welsh effects animator

- Born: Christopher Jenkins; 1960 or 1961 (age 65–66); Ton Pentre, Rhondda Valley, Wales
- Education: BA Degree in scientific illustration, Middlesex University
- Occupations: Effects animator, storyboard artist, screenwriter, director, producer
- Years active: 1988–present

Christopher Jenkins (born November 1961) is a Welsh effects animator, storyboard artist, screenwriter, director and producer.

== Early life ==
Jenkins was born and raised in Ton Pentre, Rhondda Valley in South Wales. He attended the Ton Pentre Junior School and later went to the Upper Rhondda Comprehensive School. He attended Middlesex University in England from 1982 to 1987, where he earned a BA degree in scientific illustration.

== Career ==
Jenkins started his career in 1987 as an effects animator on Who Framed Roger Rabbit. He spent most of his professional life at Walt Disney Pictures where he served as artistic coordinator on Atlantis: The Lost Empire. Before that, he was visual effects supervisor on The Hunchback of Notre Dame. He also was an effects animator on Who Framed Roger Rabbit, The Little Mermaid, Beauty and the Beast, Aladdin, The Lion King, and Hercules.

Jenkins left Disney to work at Sony Pictures Imageworks, where he conceived the idea for Surf's Up. Jenkins had been attached to direct Hotel Transylvania before leaving the company.

He worked at Blue Sky Studios in Greenwich, Connecticut, for one year during the development of Rio.

As of August 2011, Jenkins is at DreamWorks Animation, where he produced the 2015 animated feature film Home.

== Filmography ==
Year	Title	Credits
1988	Who Framed Roger Rabbit	Effects animator
1989	The Little Mermaid	Effects animator
1990	The Prince and the Pauper (short)	Layout artist / effects animator
1991	Beauty and the Beast	Effects animator
1992	Aladdin	Effects animator
1993	Trail Mix-Up (short)	Special effects animator
1994	The Lion King	Effects animator
1995	Pocahontas	Pre-production effects development artist
1996	The Hunchback of Notre Dame	Visual effects supervisor
1997	Hercules	Visual effects animator
2001	Atlantis: The Lost Empire	Artistic coordinator
2006	Open Season	Special thanks
2007	Surf's Up	Producer / screenplay by / story by
2014	Almost Home (short)	Producer
2015	Home	Producer
2018	Duck Duck Goose	Director / screenplay / story by
2024	10 Lives	Director & writer
2025	Sneaks	Director
TBA	The Ark and the Aardvark	Story
