= Robin Lefevre =

British theatre director

Robin Lefevre (sometimes "Lefèvre", born 1947) is a British theatre director. He has worked in Britain, Ireland, Australia, and the United States.

== Career ==
Lefevre began as an actor in Scottish repertory theatre as well as playing small parts on British television during the late 1960s and early 1970s, In the 70's he focussed more on directing and had major success with John Byrne's first play, Writer's Cramp. He is associated with the Hampstead Theatre in London. In New York City, his Broadway directing credits include Brian Friel's The Aristocrats for which he won the New York Drama Desk Award for Best Director, and Frank McGuinness's Tony-nominated Someone Who'll Watch Over Me (Best Foreign Play, New York Drama Critics' Circle Award), as well as George Bernard Shaw's Heartbreak House with Swoosie Kurtz for the Roundabout Theatre Company.

He is also known for working with playwright Billy Roche on the first productions of each of the three plays of the Wexford Trilogy at the Bush Theatre.

== Credits ==
=== Theatre ===
This is a partial list of Lefevre's directing credits.

- Writer's Cramp (John Byrne)
- Outside Edge (Richard Harris), 1979, Queen's Theatre, London.
- Threads (John Byrne), 1984, Hampstead Theatre, Hampstead, London.
- Fall (James Saunders), 1984, Hampstead Theatre, Hampstead, London.
- Are You Lonesome Tonight? (musical by Alan Bleasdale), 1985, Phoenix Theatre, London. Evening Standard Best Musical Award.
- Rowan Atkinson: The New Revue (Richard Curtis/Ben Elton), 1986, Shaftesbury Theatre, London.
- The Weekend (Michael Palin), Strand Theatre, London.
- A Handful of Stars (Billy Roche – The Wexford Trilogy I), 1988, Bush Theatre, London.
- The Aristocrats (Brian Friel), 1989. Drama Desk Award for Outstanding Director of a Play.
- Poor Beast in the Rain (Billy Roche – The Wexford Trilogy II), 1989, Bush Theatre, London.
- Belfry (Billy Roche – The Wexford Trilogy III), 1991, Bush Theatre, London.
- Someone Who'll Watch Over Me (Frank McGuinness), 1992–1993, Booth Theatre, Broadway, NYC. (Tony Nominations: Best Play, Best Actor; New York Drama Critic's Circle Award: Best Foreign Play)
- On The Ledge (Alan Bleasdale) Co-production Nottingham Playhouse/National Theatre
- The Homecoming (Harold Pinter), 2001, the Comedy Theatre, London.
- Afterplay (Brian Friel), 2002, Gielgud Theatre, London.
- See You Next Tuesday (Francis Veber), 2003, Gate Theatre, Dublin.
- Losing Louis (Simon Mendes da Costa), 2005, Hampstead Theatre, Hampstead.
- Heartbreak House (George Bernard Shaw), 2006, American Airlines Theatre, Broadway, NYC.
- The Cavalcaders (Billy Roche), 2007, Abbey Theatre, Dublin.
- All My Sons (Arthur Miller), 2009, Gate Theatre, Dublin.
- Ladies in Lavender (adaptation by Lefevre of Charles Dance's film/screenplay), 2012, UK tour. Broadway World UK Awards 2012, Best Director.

=== Television ===
- Jake's Progress (Alan Bleasdale), six-part TV series, 1995.
- Self Catering (Andrew Cullen), Channel 4 short film, 1994.
