= Breanna Yde =

American singer and actress

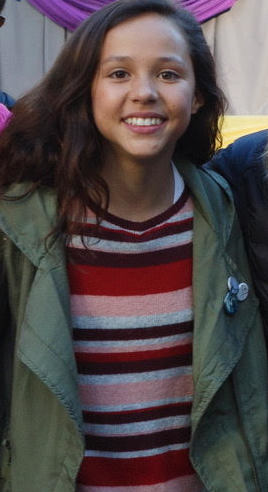
- Yde in October 2016
- Born: Breanna Nicole Yde; June 11, 2003 (age 23); Sydney, New South Wales, Australia
- Other name: YDE
- Citizenship: United States; Australia
- Occupations: Actress; singer-songwriter
- Years active: 2009–present

Breanna Nicole Yde (born June 11, 2003), also known as YDE (pronounced eed), is an Australian-American actress and singer-songwriter. She portrayed Frankie Hathaway on the television series The Haunted Hathaways, Tomika on School of Rock, Zoey in the television film Santa Hunters, Akimi in Escape from Mr. Lemoncello's Library, and Gina on the Netflix television series Malibu Rescue.

== Early life ==
Yde was born in Sydney, Australia. At the age of two, she moved to Los Angeles, California. She is a dual citizen of both the United States and Australia. In 2008, her family moved to Rancho Santa Fe, California, and she began taking acting and music lessons at age 6 the following year. She and her family moved back to Los Angeles in 2012 to further pursue acting roles.

== Career ==
=== Acting career ===
Yde earned an early role in the film, Level 26: Dark Prophecy in 2009. In 2011, she appeared in a guest role on an episode of the television series, How I Met Your Mother. Other early acting gigs included national commercials for companies, including McDonald's, AT&T, Toyota, and others. In 2012, she was cast as Frankie Hathaway on the Nickelodeon series, The Haunted Hathaways. In 2014, she appeared in the Nickelodeon television film, Santa Hunters. In 2016, she began starring as Tomika on School of Rock, another Nickelodeon series based on the 2003 film of the same name. She was nominated for the Kids' Choice Award for Favorite Female TV Star for her role as Tomika in 2017. School of Rock aired for three seasons, ending in 2018.

During her time on School of Rock, she had a recurring role as the voice of Ronnie Anne on the Nickelodeon animated series, The Loud House and appeared in the Nickelodeon television film, Escape from Mr. Lemoncello's Library. She also provided the voice of Young Mariah for the animated film, Mariah Carey's All I Want For Christmas Is You in 2017. In 2019, Yde starred as Gina in the Netflix film, Malibu Rescue. The film was followed by a series of the same name in which Yde reprised her role. She again appeared as Gina in a second film, Malibu Rescue: The Next Wave, which was released by Netflix in August 2020.

=== Musical career ===
In 2019, Yde began collaborating with pop songwriter Justin Tranter, and in 2020, she released her debut singles, "Stopped Buying Diamonds" and "BlindLife" (both co-written with Tranter) through Warner Records, under the mononym YDE. In December 2021, she starred as Sophia alongside Idina Menzel in a production of Wild: A Musical Becoming staged at the Loeb Drama Center by the American Repertory Theater in Cambridge, Massachusetts. In 2022, she began releasing new singles from her debut EP, Send Help, on which she serves as the executive producer and primary songwriter. The EP was released on September 9, 2022, via Warner Records.

== Filmography ==
List of film and television roles
Year	Title	Role	Notes
2010	Level 26: Dark Prophecy	Young Sibby Dark	
2011	How I Met Your Mother	Little Girl	Episode: "Challenge Accepted"
2013–2015	The Haunted Hathaways	Frankie Hathaway	Main role
2014	Santa Hunters	Zoey	Television film
2015	Instant Mom	Grace	Episodes: "Thumper for President", "Walk Like a Boy"
2015	Nickelodeon's Ho Ho Holiday	Herself	Television special
2016–2018	School of Rock	Tomika	Main role
2016–2018	The Loud House	Ronnie Anne	Recurring voice role (seasons 1–3)
2016	Albert	Molly	Voice role; television film
2017	Nickelodeon's Not So Valentine's Special	Herself	Main role
2017	Nicky, Ricky, Dicky & Dawn	Simone	Episode: "To Be Invited or Not to Be"
2017	Nickelodeon's Sizzling Summer Camp Special	Delores	Television special
2017	Escape from Mr. Lemoncello's Library	Akimi	Television film
2017	Mariah Carey's All I Want for Christmas Is You	Little Mariah	Voice role; direct-to-video film
2019–2020	Malibu Rescue	Gina	Main role
2020	Malibu Rescue: The Next Wave	Gina	Streaming film
2025	General Hospital	YDE	1 episode

== Awards and nominations ==
Year	Award	Category	Work	Result	Ref.
2017	Nickelodeon Kids' Choice Awards	Favorite Female TV Star	School of Rock	Nominated	

== Discography ==
=== EPs ===
- Send Help (2022)
- The Red Velvet Recordings (2023)
- 8 (2024)

=== Singles ===
- "Stopped Buying Diamonds" (2020)
- "BlindLife" (2020)
- "Old Her" (2022)
- "People Can Change" (2022)
- "Normal to Feel" (2022)
- "Therapy (feat. YDE)" (2023)
- "Free Fall" (2024)
- "Defence of Love" (2024)
- "Parachute" (2024)
