= Lance Lim =

Korean-American actor (born 2000)

- Born: Lance Dae Lim; December 16, 2000 (age 25); Los Angeles, California, U.S.
- Occupations: Actor; singer; songwriter
- Years active: 2011–present

Lance Dae Lim (born December 16, 2000) is an American actor known for his roles as Zack Kwan on the Nickelodeon television series School of Rock and as Runyen on the NBC TV series Growing Up Fisher.

== Life and career ==
Lim was born and raised in Los Angeles, California. He is of Korean descent. Prior to his breakout role on Growing Up Fisher, he competed on South Korea's MBC's Star Audition. Lim has portrayed recurring roles on various television series such as Fresh Off The Boat, Speechless and Splitting Up Together. In 2018, Netflix released their original animated feature Duck Duck Goose, in which Lim voiced Chao. In 2019, he was cast in the pilot The Edge of Seventeen and in the Netflix's feature Hubie Halloween.

== Filmography ==
Television
| Year | Title | Role | Notes |
|---|---|---|---|
| 2012 | Kirby Buckets | Kid #1 | Pilot episode |
| 2014 | Anger Management | Milo | Episode: "Charlie Gets Trashed" |
| 2014 | Growing Up Fisher | Runyen | Main role |
| 2015–2019 | Fresh Off The Boat | Justin Chen | 3 episodes |
| 2016–2018 | School of Rock | Zack Kwan | Main role |
| 2016–2019 | Speechless | Justin Chang | 4 episodes |
| 2017 | An American Girl Story: Ivy & Julie 1976 - A Happy Balance | Andrew Ling | Television film |
| 2018 | Stuck In The Middle | Kevin Casey | Episode: "Stuck with a New Squad" |
| 2018–2019 | Splitting Up Together | Gun-Woo | 3 episodes |
| 2019 | PEN15 | Eugene | Episode: "Posh" |
| 2021–2023 | Magnum P.I. | Dennis Katsumoto | Recurring role |
| 2023 | A Million Little Things | Adult Theo | Episode: "One Big Thing" |
| TBA | The Edge of Seventeen | | post-production |

Film
| Year | Title | Role | Director | Notes |
|---|---|---|---|---|
| 2011 | Jin | Paul | Il Cho | Short film |
| 2012 | Mandevilla | Son | Andrew Oh | Short film |
| 2013 | Innocent Blood | Cody | D.J. Holloway & Sun Kim | |
| 2014 | The First Minute | Harrison | Daniel Chung | Short film |
| 2016 | Independence Day: Resurgence | Camper Kevin | Roland Emmerich | |
| 2018 | Duck Duck Goose | Chao | Chris Jenkins | Voice |
| 2020 | Hubie Halloween | Kyle | Steven Brill | |
