= The Thundermans (franchise) =

Television franchise

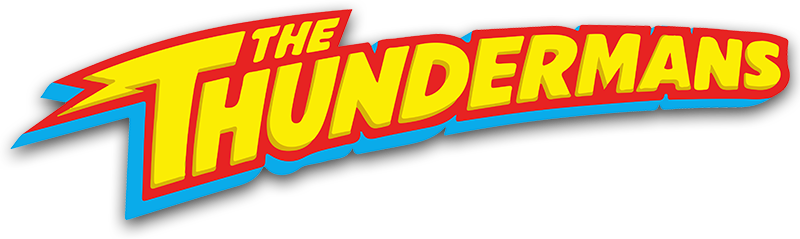
- The logo of The Thundermans (2013), which has remained a staple in the franchise.
- Created by: Jed Spingarn
- Original work: The Thundermans (2013)
- Owners: Nickelodeon Group (Skydance)
- Years: 2013–present

Films and television
- Television series: The Thundermans (2013–2018); The Thundermans: Undercover (2025–)
- Television specials: "Thundermans: Secret Revealed" (2016); "Thundermans: Banished!" (2016); "Thunder in Paradise" (2017)
- Television films: The Thundermans Return (2024); Clash of the Thundermans (2026)

The Thundermans, also known as the Thunderverse, is an American television franchise created by Jed Spingarn. The franchise began with the television series The Thundermans, which aired on Nickelodeon from 2013 to 2018, and focuses on the adventures of the Thunderman family, a family with superpowers. The franchise stars Kira Kosarin as Phoebe, Jack Griffo as Max, Addison Riecke as Nora, Diego Velazquez as Billy, Chris Tallman as Hank, Rosa Blasi as Barb, and Maya Le Clark as Chloe.

== History ==
=== Development and first series ===
On August 3, 2012, Nickelodeon announced The Thundermans as one of its upcoming series. Originally, Tyler Peterson was cast as Max Thunderman, and he starred in the pilot, which was filmed in October 2012. On February 14, 2013, it was announced that the pilot was picked up to a series, and Max's role was recast to Jack Griffo. Initially, 13 episodes were ordered, but 7 more were later ordered ahead of the series premiere. The series premiered on October 14, 2013, and ended on May 25, 2018.

=== Revival ===
Five years after the original series ended, on March 2, 2023, a follow-up film to The Thundermans titled The Thundermans Return was announced to be in development, with a majority of the main and recurring cast of the original series returned for the film. Following the success of the film, a spin-off series was announced, which began production in August 2024. Titled The Thundermans: Undercover, the series premiered on January 11, 2025, as a sneak peek, and later officially on January 22. On July 31 of the same year, another film Clash of the Thundermans was announced, which premiered on September 3, 2026.

== Cast and characters ==
Actor	Character	The Thundermans				Return	Undercover	Clash
Actor	Character	Season 1	Season 2	Season 3	Season 4	Return	Undercover	Clash
Kira Kosarin	Phoebe Thunderman	Main	Main	Main	Main	Main	Main	Main
Jack Griffo	Max Thunderman	Main	Main	Main	Main	Main	Main	Main
Addison Riecke	Nora Thunderman	Main	Main	Main	Main	Main	Guest	Main
Diego Velazquez	Billy Thunderman	Main	Main	Main	Main	Main	Guest	Main
Chris Tallman	Hank Thunderman	Main	Main	Main	Main	Main	Guest	Main
Rosa Blasi	Barb Thunderman	Main	Main	Main	Main	Main	Guest	Main
Maya Le Clark	Chloe Thunderman			Recurring	Main	Main	Main	Main
Dana Snyder	Dr. Colosso	Recurring	Recurring	Recurring	Recurring	Main	Recurring	Main
Audrey Whitby	Cherry Seinfield	Recurring	Recurring	Recurring	Recurring	Main	Guest	
Nathan Broxton	Jinx						Main	
Kinley Cunningham	Kombucha Dreamweaver						Main	

== Television series ==
=== The Thundermans (2013–2018) ===
The first series in The Thundermans franchise, The Thundermans centers on the lives of the Thunderman family, a superpowered family of six (Note: Turned seven following "A Hero Is Born", when Chloe was introduced.) who moved to the city of Hiddenville to try to live normal lives whilst hiding their secret, especially twins Phoebe, who wants to be a hero, and Max, who initially aspired to be a villain. As they grow older, the twins face various challenges involving their powers and ultimately choose to work together as heroes, eventually becoming leaders of the Z-Force alongside their family. The series premiered on October 14, 2013, and finished airing on May 25, 2018, lasting 4 seasons.

=== The Thundermans: Undercover (2025–) ===
Serving as a spinoff to The Thundermans and directly following The Thundermans Return, The Thundermans: Undercover follows Phoebe and Max, who are sent undercover to handle a new threat in Secret Shores and bring Chloe with them to develop her superhero talent and live a normal life. This new threat soon involves the mysterious villain Mastermind who is plotting to create a new incarnation of the Villain League by calling all villains to Secret Shores. The series officially premiered on January 22, 2025.

== Films ==
=== The Thundermans Return (2024) ===
The Thundermans Return is a 2024 sequel film set three years after the ending of The Thundermans, and follows the Thundermans being decommissioned and sent back to Hiddenville after breaking a Hero League law in Metroburg. While Hank and Barb enjoy the return and Billy and Nora look forward to having a normal life in high school, Max and Phoebe are determined to regain their superhero status, which leads them into looking into their replacement, the V-Team, who turn out to be villains, and are hatching a plan to villainize all of Metroburg using the red pieces of the Power Plant.

The Thundermans Return was released on Nickelodeon and Paramount+ simultaneously on March 7, 2024.

=== Clash of the Thundermans (2026) ===
Clash of the Thundermans is a 2026 film set after The Thundermans: Undercover and follows Chloe developing a new superpower called enerkinesis which she is initially unable to control, prompting the Hero League to order that she be sent to a boarding school, curated by Cognita, for five years to learn how to control it. This causes the family to become divided, with one half (Phoebe, Billy, Barb) believing she should stay and the other half (Max, Nora, Hank) believing she should go to the school, causing them to split apart, with Team Phoebe taking Chloe into hiding, and Team Max tracking them down. Unbeknownst to the whole family, Cognita has different intentions for Chloe's power.

Clash of the Thundermans was released on Nickelodeon and Paramount+ simultaneously on September 3, 2026.

== Web game ==
A side-scrolling web game titled The Thundermans: Dr. Colosso on the Run was released in 2017 and was available on the Nickelodeon website and YTV. The player controls Dr. Colosso and has to keep away from the Thundermans while avoiding various obstacles.

== Crossovers ==
The Thundermans franchise has had crossovers with other Nickelodeon shows, putting them part of the same universe.

Title	Series	Crossover with	Season	Episode	Air date
"The Haunted Thundermans"	The Thundermans (Note: "The Haunted Thundermans" was aired as an episode of both shows.)	The Haunted Hathaways	2 (both)	5 (TT); 9 (THH)	October 11, 2014
"Danger & Thunder"	Henry Danger	The Thundermans	2	17	June 18, 2016

== Reception ==
=== Critical response ===
Overall, The Thundermans franchise has received mixed critical reception, with the original series and The Thundermans Return drawing mostly negative-to-average reviews, while The Thundermans: Undercover received more mixed-to-positive reviews. Critics often praised the franchise's family-friendly humor and appeal to children but criticized its formulaic writing and exaggerated comedy. Despite the criticism, the franchise has remained popular with its young audience, with The Thundermans Return becoming a major ratings success.

=== Accolades ===
Year	Award	Category	Nominee(s)	Result	Ref.
2016	Nickelodeon Kids' Choice Awards	Favorite TV Show	The Thundermans	Won	
2016	British Academy Children's Awards	BAFTA Kids' Vote - Television	The Thundermans	Nominated	
2016	Kids' Choice Awards Argentina	Favorite International Program	The Thundermans	Nominated	
2017	Nickelodeon Kids' Choice Awards	Favorite TV Show – Kids' Show	The Thundermans	Nominated	
2017	Kids' Choice Awards Mexico	Favorite International Program	The Thundermans	Nominated	
2017	Kids' Choice Awards Colombia	Favorite International Program	The Thundermans	Nominated	
2017	Kids' Choice Awards Argentina	Favorite International Program	The Thundermans	Nominated	
2025	Kids' Choice Awards	Favorite Kids TV Show	The Thundermans: Undercover	Won	
2025	Kids' Choice Awards	Favorite Male TV Star (Kids)	Jack Griffo	Won	
2025	Kids' Choice Awards	Favorite Female TV Star (Kids)	Kira Kosarin	Won	
2025	Kids' Choice Awards	Favorite Female TV Star (Kids)	Maya Le Clark	Nominated	
