= List of The Thundermans characters =

List of characters in television series The Thundermans

The Thundermans is an American comedy television series created by Jed Spingarn that aired on Nickelodeon from October 14, 2013, to May 25, 2018, starring Kira Kosarin, Jack Griffo, Addison Riecke, Diego Velazquez, Chris Tallman, Rosa Blasi and Maya Le Clark, as well as featuring Dana Snyder as the voice of Dr. Colosso. The series was later expanded into a small franchise, including two films and 2025 spinoff series.

== Main ==
=== Phoebe Thunderman ===
Phoebe Monica Rachel Thunderman (Kira Kosarin) is a twin to Max, though she is 20 seconds older, and older sister to Billy, Nora, and Chloe. Her superhero alias is Thunder Girl. She is very responsible, a straight A student, and tries to play by the no powers rule. She has telekinesis, freeze breath, and heat breath. In "Thundersense", Phoebe develops a new ability called Thundersense, which warns her if she and others are in danger, like being trapped by a villain. Since the beginning of the third season, Phoebe has been training to become a superhero and officially becomes Thunder Girl in "Thundermans: Secret Revealed". However, in "Come What Mayhem", during an attempt to stop one of Max's former pranks from going off, Phoebe accidentally absorbs Dark Mayhem's powers and turns evil until she returns to normal in "Thunder in Paradise". At the beginning of the series, Phoebe is 14 years old.

=== Max Thunderman ===
Maximus Octavius "Max" Thunderman (Jack Griffo) is a twin to Phoebe and older brother to Nora, Billy, and Chloe. His powers include telekinesis, freeze breath, and heat breath. He is the antagonist-turned-anti-hero. Despite being raised within a family of superheroes, Max originally aspires to become a supervillain for the first three seasons. His sole reason was to not be second best to Phoebe as a hero. In "Thundermans: Secret Revealed", he finally has a change of heart and makes a life-changing decision to abandon the dark side and become a fighter for justice, using his powers and high-tech gadgets for the greater good. The fourth season focuses on Max re-adjusting to his new daily life as a superhero instead of an evil-doer, as he tackles challenges working with Phoebe in Z-Force training, which jeopardizes his friendship with Dr. Colosso. His basement bedroom serves as his secret lair, filled with high-tech gadgets and posters of the Villain League. In the fourth season, his lair has posters of the Z-Force and other superhero posters. His lair is accessible through a slide leading to his bed underneath a tea table next to the couch in the living room and it is also where he keeps his best friend and mentor, Dr. Colosso, a supervillain Thunder Man turned into a rabbit. At the beginning of the series, Max is also 14 years old.

=== Nora Thunderman ===
Nora Thunderman (Addison Riecke) is the second youngest of the Thunderman family and a mischievous little sister to Phoebe, Max, and Billy and older sister to Chloe. Her superhero alias is Laser Girl. Her superpower is laser vision. She can easily recruit Billy into any scheme of hers, as she scares him, and she usually zaps him. She has a large fascination towards bows, and is rarely seen without wearing one. Sometimes when people mess with her, she zaps them with her laser eyes. Nora and Billy play laser tag and are usually seen together in episodes.

=== Billy Thunderman ===
William "Billy" Thunderman (Diego Velazquez) is the third-born Thunderman child. He is an energetic little brother to Phoebe and Max and older brother to Nora and Chloe. His superhero alias is Kid Quick. His superpower is super-speed. It is revealed that Barb gave birth to Billy in the air while her husband was transporting her to a hospital, implying that Billy likely hit his head after birth which is probably why he is sometimes dim-witted.

=== Hank Thunderman ===
Hank Tiberius Thunderman (Chris Tallman) is the husband to Barb and father to Phoebe, Max, Nora, Billy, and Chloe. His superhero alias is Thunder Man. His superpowers are super-strength and flight. Hank has now half-unwillingly retired as a superhero in order to give his children a stable and normal home. He still uses his powers to fly to places around the world usually to get food or even to spacefly.

=== Barb Thunderman ===
Barbara "Barb" Thunderman (née McBooger; Rosa Blasi) is the wife to Hank and mother to Phoebe, Max, Nora, Billy, and Chloe. Her superhero alias is Electress. Barb's superpower is controlling electricity and lightning. Unlike her husband, she is completely okay with leaving her superheroine life behind. Barb does, however, agree with Hank that Max is going through a supervillain phase that needs to end quickly. Barb's maiden name is McBooger.

=== Chloe Thunderman ===
Chloe Thunderman (Maya Le Clark) is the youngest Thunderman child and baby sister to Phoebe, Max, Nora, and Billy. Her superhero alias is Thunder Baby. Barb gives birth to her in "A Hero Is Born". Chloe's babyhood superpower is making bubbles, and her permanent superpower is teleportation. In the third season, she is a recurring character, but is promoted to a main character in the fourth season.

In Clash of the Thundermans, Chloe develops enerkinesis.

== Recurring ==
=== Cherry Seinfield ===
Cherry (Audrey Whitby) is Phoebe's best friend who is bubbly, funny and dimwitted. She was originally unaware of the family's superpowers, learning about them in "A Hero Is Born". Principal Bradford refers to her as "Cherry Seinfeld" in an episode of the fourth season.

=== Dr. Ebenezer Colosso ===
Dr. Colosso (voiced by Dana Snyder in rabbit form; also portrayed by Snyder in human form) is one of the world's greatest villains of the Villain League and Hank's former nemesis until Hank transformed him into a rabbit while still Thunder Man. He is kept in Max's bedroom. It is shown that Dr. Colosso likes Max very much. Despite being a supervillain, he's occasionally helped the family, such as delivering Chloe when Barb went into labor and alerting Max and Phoebe when Falconmans daughter tried taking over Hiddenville.

In "A Hero Is Born", Dr. Colosso is temporarily turned back to his human form so he can go get an award, though it is actually a plot by fellow villains King Crab, Lady Web, and Scalestro to get him kicked out due to being inactive in villainy.

Other times when Dr. Colosso is turned human is when Phoebe has him pose as her uncle on family game night and when he steals the animalizer in a plot to disrupt Hank and Barb's wedding vow renewal, similar to when he disrupted their first wedding.

Dr. Colosso's puppet is performed by Stephen, Edward, and Charles Chiodo, with assistance in later episodes from Kevin Carlson.

=== Thunder Monitor ===
The Thunder Monitor (voiced by Jennifer Hale) is the monitor owned by the Thundermans. It would alert the Thundermans if anyone was coming or if they were getting contacted by Super President Kickbutt.

=== Evan ===
Evan (Elijah Nelson) is a student at Hiddenville High and a member of Sarah's group of smart students. His best friend is a pet iguana known as Eleanor.

In "I'm Gonna Forget You, Sucka", it is revealed that Evan is in fact a secret agent of the Hero League who has been posing as an undercover student in order to protect the Thundermans. He is a 50-year-old man with family, but looks like a teenage boy because his superpower is that he does not age.

=== Sarah ===
Sarah (Keely Marshall) is a student at Hiddenville High who has an obsessive crush on Max. She is also a friend of Phoebe's. She is very smart and is the apparent leader of a group of smart students, commonly known as "Sarah's Group".

=== Mrs. Wong / Olympia Wong ===
Mrs. Wong (Helen Hong) is the neighbor of the Thundermans and the owner of a pizza restaurant who is never nice to anyone, especially to the Thundermans.

In "This Looks Like a Job For..." Phoebe and Max take up jobs in her restaurant, but end up getting fired after they inadvertently destroy her kitchen, thus igniting her contempt for the twins and their family. In "Thundermans: Secret Revealed", she exposes the Thundermans to the people in Hiddenville upon figuring out their secret identities. Later, it is revealed that her first name is Olympia. In "Thundermans: Banished!" her restaurant is accidentally destroyed by Phoebe and Max's attempts to stop an explosion, causing Super President Kickbutt to relocate the Thundermans to Antarctica and reassign their post to Falcon Man's family. She later rebuilds it, only for Candi Falconman to crash through her roof. She is among the Hiddenville residents to be fooled by Super President Kickbutt's fake power-removal on the Thundermans. She is also the aunt of Darcy Wong.

=== Principal Bradford ===
Principal Tad Bradford (Jeff Meacham) is Hiddenville High's principal. He is shown to hate his job, have a sad life, and dislike the Thunderman family because of Max's pranks.

In "21 Dump Street", it is revealed that Principal Bradford lives at the school and has a reclining bed behind some lockers. It is also revealed that he has not gotten over his first breakup, which is the reason for his sad and depressing life.

=== Cousin Blobbin ===
Cousin Blobbin (Harvey Guillen) is the sidekick of Barb's deceased millionaire Uncle Wilfred and Barb's cousin, who operated as the All American Blob, and 2nd cousin of the Thunderman children. In his will, Wilfred left his enormous fortune and mansion for Blobbin. Blobbin is extremely devoted to his family and usually helps the Thundermans in whatever way he can. His superpower is that he is invincible on the outside but is very sensitive on the inside.

=== Oyster ===
Oyster (Tanner Stine) is a guitarist boy who is in Max's new band as of "Pheebs Will Rock You". Phoebe initially has a crush on him until she learns that he is somewhat crazy. He considers guitars to be live female beings, following their "decisions", talking to them, and even writing songs for them.

=== Super President Evelyn Kickbutt ===
Super President Evelyn Kickbutt (Daniele Gaither) is the president of the Hero League. She alerts the Thundermans of any supervillains in the area and also presents superheroes that graduated from the Hero League Academy their capes.

In The Thundermans: Undercover, Super President Kickbutt sends Phoebe and Max to Secret Shores to investigate some villain sightings leading to the discover that a mysterious villain named Mastermind is planning to start a Villain League branch there.

In Clash of the Thundermans, a news report from the news presenter superhero Newsflash has him mentioning that Super President Kickbutt is retiring and that the examples of her possible successors are Phoebe, Squidonculus, and Max sometime after the Thundermans defeated Replicator at an event where Thunder Man was being honored. She also finds out about Chloe's new enerkinesis ability and recommends that she be sent to a special school run by Cognita.

=== Maddy ===
Maddy (Gabrielle Elyse) is a member of Madison's cheerleading squad. She eventually becomes one of Phoebe's friends.

=== Link Evilman ===
Link (Barrett Carnahan) is Phoebe's boyfriend who is the son of Hank's former supervillain nemesis Evilman. Eventually, their relationship ends when Link begins to use his powers as a hero, but ends up assigned in Hong Kong by the Hero League. His superpower is elasticity.

=== Gideon ===
Gideon (Kenny Ridwan) is a boy in Max's band. He has feelings toward Max's mother, which leaves everyone grossed out, and later begins to develop feelings toward Phoebe.

=== Wolfgang ===
Wolfgang (Jake Borelli) is a drum player of Max's band. He is from Germany and came to Hiddenville for a school cultural exchange project. He speaks very little English, with a strong German accent. He often communicates by saying "Wolfgang!" in different intonations to convey different messages and emotions.

=== Allison ===
Allison (Ryan Newman) is Hiddenville High's do-gooder who invests in every single social cause especially protecting the environment. She is Max's girlfriend. In "21 Dump Street", Allison breaks up with Max off-screen as she leaves Hiddenville to join EarthCorps and protect the Earth.

== Notable guest cast and characters ==
=== Tara Campbell ===
Tara Campbell (Katherine McNamara) is a girl whom Max develops a crush on in "Dinner Party" when he sees similarities of himself in her. She turns out to be the sister to Cole Campbell, Phoebe's crush.

=== Math Teacher ===
Math Teacher (Kelly Perine) appears in "Report Card". He is the host of Hiddenville High's Math Bowl.

=== Ashley ===
Ashley (Krista Marie Yu) is a student at Hiddenville High and a member of Sarah's Group. In "Report Card", she is one of the only two members of the group who support Phoebe as the team captain while the rest join Max's team. In "Mall Time Crooks", she joins Phoebe at the mall where they pretend to be wealthy British heiresses to try expensive clothes without paying.

=== Flunky ===
Flunky (Jace Norman) is Max's assistant when Max becomes president in "You Stole My Thunder, Man". He also develops a crush on his twin sister Phoebe.

=== Darcy Wong ===
Darcy Wong (Haley Tju) is Mrs. Wong's niece who likes to cause trouble. In "Crime After Crime", she draws the attention of the Home Owners Association after vandalizing the neighborhood. In "Pretty Little Choirs", she snoops around to try to find out any secrets that she can about the Thundermans. After finding out that Dr. Colosso can talk, Darcy steals and tortures him to make him talk. He is rescued later by Nora and Billy.

=== Sensei Kenny ===
Sensei Kenny (Kel Mitchell) is a dojo instructor. In "Have an Ice Birthday", his dojo accidentally carries Mrs. Wong, who had been frozen by Phoebe and Max. Phoebe uses her superpowers to deceive him into thinking she is a chosen heir in order to get Mrs. Wong.

=== Dylan ===
Dylan (Jordan Fisher) is a boy who often takes care of his baby brother. In "Four Supes and a Baby", Phoebe has a crush on him and tries to have things in common by bringing her siblings to a play date with him at the park. However, they accidentally steal Dylan's baby brother.

=== Morgan ===
Morgan (Lizzy Greene) is a girl who makes fun of Nora and Billy for not having parents with cool jobs in "Pheebs Will Rock You". This pressures Billy, who accidentally blurts out that his father is a superhero.

=== Cassandra ===
Cassandra (Sydney Park) is a girl who works as a waitress at Splatburger. In "Shred It Go", Max pretends to like MKTO to impress her. When Cassandra's concert ticket falls through, Max steals Phoebe's for her. She ends up posting embarrassing photos of him.

=== Malcolm Kelley and Tony Oller ===
Malcolm Kelley and Tony Oller of MKTO appear as themselves in "Shred It Go". On their way to a concert, they pass by Splatburger, where they find Phoebe, who is a big fan of theirs. When Phoebe saves Tony from eating a pineapple because he is allergic, they thank her by performing a song for her.

=== Mr. Evilman ===
Mr. Evilman (Eric Allan Kramer) was Hank's greatest nemesis. He used to be a good person until he met up with Dark Mayhem, who influenced him to turn evil. However, he eventually retires from his supervillain life and becomes a mattress store salesman in Hiddenville. In "Meet the Evilmans", he tries to stop Link from dating Phoebe. In "Evil Never Sleeps", he helps the Hero League test Phoebe by pretending to be evil.

=== Mrs. Austin ===
Mrs. Austin (Rebecca Metz) is the government teacher in Phoebe's class. In "The Girl with the Dragon Snafu", she forces Phoebe and Max to work on a class project together after they both get kicked out of their group projects. In "Date Expectations", she assigns the class to work on a Model U.N. project.

=== Cutest Baby Judge ===
Cutest Baby Judge (Alec Mapa) appears in "A Hero Is Born". He is the judge for the Cutest Baby Competition. Since Nora was banned from the store that hosted the Competition, we can assume he was the one that banned her.

=== Dark Mayhem ===
Dark Mayhem (performed by Omid Zader, voiced by Jamieson Price) is a full-costumed villain, considered to be the world's most dangerous, who is an elite member of the Villain League. He is a parody of both Darth Vader and Doctor Doom and debuts as an Uncle Sam-like poster in Max's room.

In "Phoebe vs. Max: The Sequel", he starts contacting Max via video chat to test him and later admits to knowing the origin of Mr. Evilman. Max idolizes him up until "Thundermans: Secrets Revealed", where he, Fairy Pinch-ess, Strongdor, and Son of Scalestro plan to have Max use a special orb to drain Phoebe's powers. He is defeated by Phoebe and Max, who drain him of his powers and throw him in prison. In "Thunder in Paradise", Dark Mayhem is shown incarcerated in Metroburg Superjail with Strongdor as his cellmate. Phoebe visits Dark Mayhem to consult him into getting rid of his abilities after the incident in "Come What Mayhem". However, he tells her that she cannot and to embrace him to take over the world while directing her to where they can find his former robot sidekick Destructo. Phoebe states that she will be more evil than him. Eventually, Phoebe is freed from Dark Mayhem's powers, with the help of Max and the rest of the family. Destructo's head flies towards Metroburg Superjail where it lands in Dark Mayhem and Strongdor's cell.

The reunion movie The Thundermans Return reveals that Dark Mayhem has a son named Dark Mayhem Jr. who infiltrated the Hero League alongside King Crab's daughter She-Crab and Strongdor's son Krondor. The children spring their parents from Metroburg Superjail after claiming the Power Plant. During the Thunderman's fight with the villains, Dark Mayhem is defeated when Phoebe and Max freeze him in ice.

=== Harris Evilman ===
Harris Evilman (Casey Simpson) is the son of Mr. Evilman. In "Patch Me If You Can", Link asks Phoebe to babysit Harris while he prepares a surprise birthday party for him. While in Max's lair, Harris puts on an evil eye patch that Max was making. It amplifies his fire power and turns him evil. He is later defeated by Nora.

=== Tech Rider ===
Tech Rider (Carlos PenaVega) is a superhero who comes equipped with a lot of high-tech tools. In "No Country for Old Mentors", Phoebe chooses him to be her superhero mentor. However, he turns out to be a horrible mentor because he acts without strategic thinking.

=== Roxy ===
Roxy (Camille Hyde) is a student at Hiddenville High and Maddy's best friend. In "Kiss Me Nate", Roxy and Maddy become part of Phoebe's entourage when she is cast as the leading lady in a school play. In "Thundermans: Secret Revealed", she helps in decorations and later goes to the dance as part of Phoebe's group.

=== Gary ===
Gary (Chris Jericho) is Allison's father. In "Beat the Parents", he invites Max to meet him in his gym to make sure he is good enough for Allison. When Phoebe and Max mess up, he forbids Allison from seeing Max. Eventually, Max and Allison stand up to their parents and are allowed to date again.

=== Rodney ===
Rodney (Issac Ryan Brown) is a student at the Secret Academy of Superhero Studies. In "Back to School", he is one of the students who missed the fifth-grade power assessment test. His superpower is generating a force field.

=== Candi Falconman ===
Candi Falconman (Jada Facer) is the teenage daughter of the superhero family that moves into the Thundermans house in "Thundermans: Banished!" Since she struggles to make friends, Candi hypnotizes people to like her. She is stopped by Phoebe and Max before hypnotizing the entire city.

=== Nora's Fan ===
Nora's Fan (JoJo Siwa) is one of the fans who attends Nora and Billy's Thunder-Con in "Thundermans: Banished!" She shares a connection with Nora because they both love bows. She is later disappointed when Nora abandons them after a fan war erupts.

=== Grandpa Giddy ===
Grandpa Giddy (James Hong) is Gideon's grandfather. He appears in "Ditch Perfect" and "Mad Max: Beyond Thunderhome".

=== Heinrich Hiddenville III ===
Heinrich Hiddenville III (Owen Joyner) is the former mayor of Hiddenville. He appears in "Save the Past Dance" when Phoebe and Max go back in time and mess up the events that end up causing him to miss a dance contest and turn to a life of crime as he grows up.

=== Uncle Mark McGrath ===
Uncle Mark McGrath (Mark McGrath) is Sarah's uncle who owns the band Sugar Ray. After learning about him in "Can't Hardly Date", Max tries to win Sarah back so that she can take him to Mark McGrath's concert and introduce him.

=== Cheyanne ===
Cheyanne (Daniella Perkins) is a famous pop artist who is holding a concert performance in "Rhythm n' Shoes", which Phoebe, Max, and Cherry all try to sneak into. In addition, Max develops a crush on her and wants to date her because she is a celebrity.

=== Assista Boy ===
Assista Boy (Thomas Lennon) is Hank and Barb's former sidekick. In "Side-Kicking and Screaming", Phoebe and Max forge their parents' signatures to make him their sidekick. However, when they start fighting over him, he turns into an evil monster and starts attacking them.

=== Sweet Gam Gam ===
Sweet Gam Gam (Marla Gibbs) owns a cookie factory which runs a contest in "Cookie Mistake". When Phoebe wins and takes Billy with her, Max and Nora sneak in to steal the cookie. Sweet Gam Gam mistakes Phoebe and Billy as the thieves and starts beating them.

=== Pageant Contest Host ===
Pageant Contest Host (Pat Finn) appears in "Cookie Mistake".

=== Professor Meteor ===
Professor Meteor (Brian Stepanek) is a supervillain who wants revenge on Hank and Barb for putting him in jail many years ago. In "The Thundredth", he wants to launch a meteor to hit the Thundermans house. He is stopped by Phoebe and Max. However, Super President Kickbutt doesn't count this as their 100th save since they didn't stop him from robbing a restaurant in his civilian form.

=== Balfour Colosso ===
Balfour (Joey Bragg), also known as The Gamer, is one of the finalists who competes in the Z-Force championships in "The Thunder Games". It is later revealed that he is Dr. Colosso's son through an unknown woman. He holds the Thundermans hostage for turning his father into a bunny. Balfour is defeated by Phoebe and Max and turned into a bunny as well.

Although Balfour is missing from The Thundermans Return, he does actually have a part in the movie. Unfortunately, the scenes ended up on the cutting room floor due to time constraints, not only resulting in the movie receiving an extended version but also resulting in the character not appearing or getting mentioned in the movie. Kira Kosarin mentioned all of this and the fact that she would like to have Balfour returning in The Thundermans franchise if the movie received a sequel or a spin-off.

=== Commander Dirk Trumbo ===
Commander Dirk Trumbo (Daran Norris) is the Z-Force commander. In "The Thunder Games", he hosts the Z-Force championships to pick a new member of the Z-Force, in which Phoebe and Max compete. Super President Kickbutt later fires him from Z-Force for being self-absorbed and refusing to send Z-Force to save the Thundermans where he is reduced to being one of her personal assistants.

== See also ==
- List of The Thundermans episodes
