= Clash of the Thundermans =

2026 American television film

- Release poster
- Directed by: Trevor Kirschner
- Written by: Jed Spingarn; Sean W. Cunningham; Marc Dworkin
- Based on: The Thundermans by Jed Spingarn
- Produced by: Jed Spingarn; Kira Kosarin; Jack Griffo; Sean W. Cunningham; Marc Dworkin; Brian Banks
- Starring: Kira Kosarin; Jack Griffo; Maya Le Clark; Addison Riecke; Diego Velazquez; Ariel Winter; Daniele Gaither; Dana Snyder; Chris Tallman; Rosa Blasi
- Cinematography: Carlos Gonzalez
- Edited by: Jeff Wright
- Music by: Frederik Wiedmann
- Production companies: Thinky Boy; Dworkingham Productions; Paramount Television Studios
- Distributed by: Nickelodeon; Paramount+
- Release date: September 3, 2026
- Running time: 71 minutes

Clash of the Thundermans is a 2026 American superhero comedy film directed by Trevor Kirschner and written by Jed Spingarn, Sean W. Cunningham and Mark Dworkin. It is the second film in The Thundermans franchise, following The Thundermans Return (2024). The film stars Kira Kosarin, Jack Griffo, Maya Le Clark, Chris Tallman, Rosa Blasi, Addison Riecke and Diego Velazquez reprising their roles as the Thunderman family, with Ariel Winter joining the cast.

Clash of the Thundermans premiered simultaneously on Nickelodeon and Paramount+ on September 3, 2026.

== Plot ==
As the Thundermans are being rewarded at the Hall of Heroes by Super President Kickbutt, the Replicator, a villain Hank locked up years ago, crashes the ceremony. As the family fight off his various duplicates, Chloe has a sudden power surge which blows the family away. Not thinking too much of it yet, Max scans the duplicates to find the real Replicator and Phoebe freezes him.

Afterwards, Barb takes Chloe to the super doctor and they discover Chloe is developing a new power: enerkinesis, the power to manipulate energy, but she can't control it yet. On the Superhero Evening News, it is announced that Kickbutt may be stepping down and Phoebe may be taking her place. Kickbutt calls the team and they discuss Chloe's new power and its potential danger. Kickbutt propose to send Chloe to Top Secret Hero League School for Gifted Supes (T.S.H.L.S.F.G.S.) and introduces the family to Cognita, the school's principal with hyper-intelligence.

The Thundermans are split on the decision: Phoebe, Billy, and Barb want Chloe to stay while Max, Nora, and Hank feel she should go. An argument breaks out, and when Chloe breaks it up, her powers activate and destroy most the house. Kickbutt and Cognita show up for Chloe, the latter giving her a numbing agent to temporarily stop her powers. Phoebe freezes Kickbutt, Cognita, Max, Nora, and Hank before making an escape with Billy, Barb, and Chloe. The escapees are declared fugitives of the Hero League, and Max is directed to lead what's left of the T-Force to retrieve Chloe. Meanwhile, Phoebe, Billy, Barb, and Chloe go to the Hall of Heroes Museum to retrieve Antidote Man's Lasso of Healing to undo the numbing of Chloe's powers. They are almost apprehended by Max, Nora, and Chloe, but Dr. Colosso crashes the Thunder Van into the wall, inadvertently giving them an escape route.

They go to the barn of Mee-Maw, Barb's mother whose power is sonic screaming, and she successfully uses the Lasso of Healing on Chloe, restoring her powers. Meanwhile, Max invents a quasiparticle thermo-energy detector to track Chloe's location. After failing to control her power multiple times, the other half of the family arrive for Chloe. This results in a fight between the two halves, with Phoebe facing Max, Barb facing Hank, and Billy facing Nora. Mee-Maw uses her sonic scream to halt the fighting, and Chloe announces she will go to the school. She teleports into Kickbutt's office, resigning herself. One of Cognita's students, Granite Girl, enters and calcifies Kickbutt into a statue of stone. Chloe is taken to Cognita's lair, where she is introduced to Cognita's students: Granite Girl, Magneteen, Toxic Todd, Sludgerella, and Desk Boy. She reveals her full intentions to use Chloe's enerkinesis to obliterate all of Metroburg. While handcuffed, Chloe manages to teleport to her wristwatch and send a distress signal to her family, allowing them to pinpoint her location.

Cognita brainwashes Chloe and makes her create an energy storm while the rest of the family defeat her students. Cognita uses Chloe against the family and tries to shoot Max with a blaster, but Phoebe jumps in the way to save him and she is shot unconscious. Angered, Max unscrews Cognita's headband, dumbing her down while he grabs the blaster. Barb uses the Lasso of Healing to revive Phoebe, and they head outside to deal with the energy storm. Chloe manages to control her enerkinesis and stop the energy storm.

Once at home, Kickbutt calls, offering Phoebe the position of Super President, which she declines to focus on her bettering relationship with Max. Phoebe goes to Max's lair to talk to him, but she only finds his hologram, revealing that he had left for the sake of Phoebe becoming Super President. Meanwhile, an unnamed hero in black stops three men from stealing a kid's bike. Noticing his freeze breath, the kid assumes he is Max Thunderman but the hero denies and flies away with a jetpack.

== Cast ==
- Kira Kosarin as Phoebe Thunderman
- Jack Griffo as Max Thunderman
- Maya Le Clark as Chloe Thunderman
- Chris Tallman as Hank Thunderman
- Rosa Blasi as Barb Thunderman
- Addison Riecke as Nora Thunderman
- Diego Velazquez as Billy Thunderman
- Ariel Winter as Cognita
- Daniele Gaither as Super President Kickbutt
- Robyn Bradley as Mee-Maw
- Ben Van Huis as Replicator
- Clifton Murray as the Newsflash
- Peyton Feltham as Granite Girl
- Marco Walker-Ng as Captain Chisel
- Tatyana Decker as Lieutenant #1
- Paul Almedia as Lieutenant #2
- Keith Dallas as Ralph Riggins
- Kingston Chan as Mangateen
- Sebastian Billingsley-Rodriguez as Kid Ricochet
- Liam Louis as Desk Boy
- Grace Sunar as Sludgerella
- Rajan Lalli as Toxic Todd

=== Voices ===
- Dana Snyder as Dr. Colosso
- Jennifer Hale as Thunder Moniter
- David Kaye as Max's Computer
- Piotr Michael as Replicator
- Shelby Young as Slideshow Narrator

== Production ==
=== Development ===
Prior to the film's official announcement, Production Weekly confirmed that Clash of the Thundermans was in the works on June 19, 2025. Nickelodeon officially announced the film the following month on July 31.

=== Casting ===
Upon the film's announcement, it was reported that Kira Kosarin, Jack Griffo, Maya Le Clark, Chris Tallman, Rosa Blasi, Addison Riecke, and Diego Velazquez would reprise their roles as the Thunderman family, with Ariel Winter joining the cast as a new character named Cognita. Dana Snyder and Daniele Gaither would later be reported to be reprising their roles as Dr. Colosso and Super President Kickbutt respectively, alongside newcomer Robyn Bradley, starring as Mee-Maw.

=== Filming ===
Principal photography began on July 31, 2025, in Vancouver, British Columbia. On August 10, filming suffered a temporary delay due to a bomb threat, which was proven false. Filming wrapped in September.

== Soundtrack ==
An official soundtrack was released on September 3, 2026, featuring 21 songs from the film, composed by Frederik Wiedmann.

== Release ==
On July 22, 2026, it was announced that Clash of the Thundermans would release on September 3, 2026 on Nickelodeon and Paramount+ simultaneously. The trailer for the film was released on August 6, 2026.

== Reception ==
=== Critical response ===
Mama's Geeky's Tessa Smith gave Clash of the Thundermans a very positive review, praising its humor, relatable family conflict, nostalgic charm, and unpredictable story, especially enjoying how Chloe’s new powers serve as a metaphor for growing up and how the family’s disagreement over her future gives the movie genuine emotional stakes. Common Sense Media reviewer Ashley Moulton rated the film a 3-out-of-5 stars, arguing that the film is an unoriginal, trope-heavy superhero comedy with unnecessary fights, but fans may enjoy its silly humor and heartfelt ending.

=== Accolades ===
Award	Date of ceremony	Category	Recipient(s)	Results	Ref.
Nickelodeon Kids' Choice Awards	November 14, 2026	Watch Party: Kids' Choice	Clash of the Thundermans	Nominated	
