= Daniele Gaither =

American actress and comedian

- Born: September 6, 1970 (age 56)
- Education: Northwestern University
- Occupations: Actress, comedian
- Years active: 1993–present

Daniele Gaither is an American actress and comedian. She is most notable for her membership in the recurring cast of comedians on sketch comedy series MADtv and for her role of Super President Kickbutt in The Thundermans.

== Early life ==
Daniele Gaither was born on September 6, 1970, and graduated from Northwestern University. In 1993, she moved to Los Angeles to pursue an acting career and attended the Groundlings School.

Gaither's first regular television appearance was on Hype in 2000. She later appeared on NBC's The Rerun Show. Gaither had a role as a hairdresser on Comedy Central's Reno 911!.

== MADtv ==
Gaither appeared in an episode of MADtv's second season, which featured rap star Ice-T. The skit depicted a mock debate between U.S. President Bill Clinton (played by Bryan Callen) and U.S. Senator Bob Dole (played by David Herman) who transformed himself into a "twisted" version of the 1970s blaxploitation icon Dolemite. Gaither played one of Dole's "Dolemite girls."

Gaither officially joined the cast of MADtv in 2003 as a featured performer for the ninth season. She became the second black female cast member in the show's history when she replaced Debra Wilson. Gaither was promoted to repertory performer status the following season.

Gaither portrayed offbeat impersonations of celebrities, which included Lawanda Page, Condoleezza Rice, Eve, La La Vasquez, and Tyra Banks.

=== Characters ===
- Dellie Mae Jackson (7 A.M. Condo Report)
- Loretta (Taco Hell)
- Mrs. Conkling (Holly Meadow Estates)
- Renee (QVC Quacker Factory)
- Shatrice (The B.S.)
- Yvoone Criddle
- Ruth Shaw (The Great North)

=== Impressions ===
- Aisha Tyler
- Alicia Keys
- Bonnie Franklin (as Ann Romano from One Day at a Time)
- Beyoncé Knowles
- Brittany Murphy
- Chandra Wilson
- Condoleezza Rice
- Eve
- Fantasia
- Helen Martin (as Pearl Shay from 227)
- Isabel Sanford (as Louise Jefferson from The Jeffersons)
- Jackée Harry
- Jada Pinkett Smith
- Janet Jackson (as Charlene from Diff'rent Strokes)
- Jully Black
- Lark Voorhees (as Lisa Turtle from Saved by the Bell)
- Kim Fields (as Tootie Ramsey in The Facts of Life)
- La La Vasquez
- LaWanda Page (as Aunt Esther from Sanford & Son)
- Lil' Kim
- Marla Gibbs (as Florence Johnston from The Jeffersons)
- Mary J. Blige
- Mo'Nique
- Mýa
- Omarosa Manigault
- Oprah Winfrey
- Patti LaBelle
- Raven-Symoné
- Regina Taylor
- Star Jones
- Tyra Banks
- Vanessa Minnillo
- Wanda Sykes

== PETA involvement ==
Gaither is a lifelong vegetarian and animal lover. She was nominated for PETA’s 2004 "World’s Sexiest Vegetarians". She also co-hosted the "2003 Rotten Jellyfish Awards" with fellow Groundling Jennifer Coolidge.

== Filmography ==
=== Film ===
Year	Title	Role(s)	Notes
2008	Necessary Evil	Gail	
2013	No Ordinary Hero: The SuperDeafy Movie	Casting Receptionist	Cameo
2024	The Thundermans Return	Super President Kickbutt	Paramount+ Original Movie
2026	Clash of the Thundermans	Super President Kickbutt	Paramount+ Original Movie

=== Television ===
Year	Title	Role(s)	Notes
1996; 2003–2007	Mad TV	Various characters	65 episodes
2000–2001	Hype	Various characters	16 episodes
2002	The Rerun Show	Various characters	6 episodes
2003; 2005	Reno 911!	Chandra	Episodes: "Jones Gets Suspended" and "Weigel and Craig Get Married"
2007	Tyler Perry's House of Payne	Smokey / Ntosake	Episode: "Crazy in Love"
2008	Chocolate News	Regina Mayweather	Episode: "Episode 6"
2010	Greek	Mailwoman	Episode: "All Children… Grow Up"
2012–2014	Key & Peele	Various characters	3 episodes
2013	Neil's Puppet Dreams	Bessy the Cow	Episode: "Bollywood"
2014–2018	The Thundermans	Super President Kickbutt	18 episodes
2014	The Haunted Hathaways	Super President Kickbutt	Episode: "The Haunted Thundermans"
2015	2 Broke Girls	Inez	Episode: "And the Minor Problem"
2015	The Soul Man	Coral	Episode: "Busting Boyce"
2016	Uncle Buck	Tasha	Episode: "Block Party"
2016	Transparent	Drag Tootie	Episode: "Just the Facts"
2016–2018	American Dad!	Nurse / Nicki Minaj (voice)	3 episodes
2016–2020	BoJack Horseman	Sextina Aquafina / Various (voice)	5 episodes
2017	Mike Tyson Mysteries	Viennetta (voice)	Episode: "A Mine Is a Terrible Thing to Waste"
2018	Nobodies	Guard	Episode: "Meeting Steven Spielberg"
2018	Angie Tribeca	Gate Agent	Episode: "Air Force Two"
2019	A Black Lady Sketch Show	Pearl Shay	Episode: "3rd & Bonaparte Is Always in the Shade"
2019	Mad About You	Janelle	Episode: "Restraining Orders and Puppies"
2021	Bob's Burgers	Violet (voice)	Episode: "FOMO You Didn't"
2021–2025	The Great North	Various voices	17 episodes
2022	The Woman in the House Across the Street from the Girl in the Window	Correctional Officer	Episode: "Episode 7"
2025	The Thundermans: Undercover	Super President Kickbutt	3 episodes
