= Frank Leaves for the Orient =

American sitcom

- Created by: Michael Kaplan; John Sanborn
- Starring: Stan Cahill; Peggy Jo Jacobs; Janet Carroll; Rebecca Chalmers; Chris Tallman
- Country of origin: United States
- No. of seasons: 1
- No. of episodes: 6

Production
- Running time: 23 minutes

Original release
- Network: Comedy Central
- Release: August 8 – September 12, 1999

Frank Leaves for the Orient is an American sitcom produced by Comedy Central, which aired for 6 episodes over mid-1999. The series starred Stan Cahill as Frank, an American preparing to leave for Japan.

== Plot ==
This stream-of-consciousness live-action comedy is a journey through the protagonist Frank's to-do list, as he tries to escape his everyday life by moving to Japan to teach English. Each episode of Frank Leaves for the Orient deals with another aspect of Frank's attempts to wrap up his life, break up with his girlfriend, quit his job, etc. The action becomes a surreal, rapid-fire, sometimes non-linear story that splits apart and then comes back together.

== Episodes ==
| No. | Title | Directed by | Written by | Original release date | Prod. code |
|---|---|---|---|---|---|
| 1 | "The Girlfriend" | Tim Boxell | Michael Kaplan | August 8, 1999 | 101 |
Frank has to break up with his girlfriend before moving to Japan.
| 2 | "Quit Your Job" | John Sanborn | Michael Kaplan | August 15, 1999 | 102 |
Frank has to quit his job before moving to Japan.
| 3 | "Ed" | John Sanborn | Michael Kaplan | August 22, 1999 | 103 |
Frank realizes his best friend wants to come to Japan with him, and has to figure out how to break up with a guy.
| 4 | "Chloe" | John Sanborn | Jennifer Heftler, Lisa Page | August 29, 1999 | 104 |
Just when he thought he was going to get away clean, Frank bumps into his dream girl, Chloe.
| 5 | "Mom & Dad" | Tim Boxell | Michael Kaplan | September 5, 1999 | 105 |
Over lunch at a Chinese restaurant, Frank tries to convince his parents that moving to Japan is a sane, responsible choice.
| 6 | "Sell Your Stuff" | John Sanborn | John Sanborn, Michael Kaplan | September 12, 1999 | 106 |
Frank holds the mother of all garage sales, trying to outrun all his past selves.

== Critical reception ==
New York Daily News reviewer David Bianculli rated the show 3.5 out of 4 stars, writing that the show "has its own energy, its own pace and style, and...a clear and clever continuing plot line". He praised the use of fantasy sequences, musical numbers, and flashbacks.
