= Maya Le Clark =

American actress (born 2011)

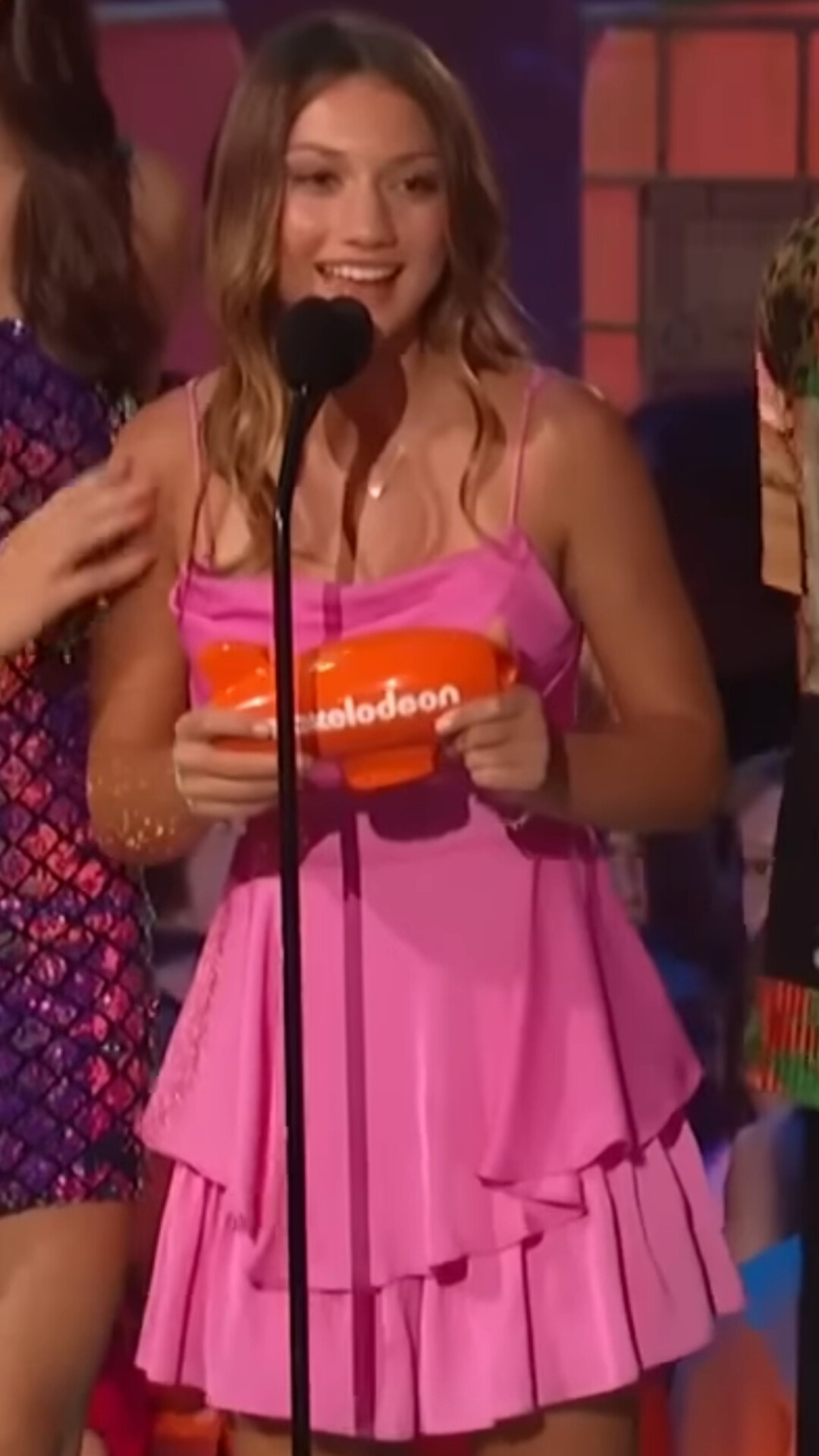
- Le Clark in 2025
- Born: March 28, 2011 (age 15); San Diego, California, U.S.
- Occupation: Actress
- Years active: 2014–present

Maya Le Clark (born March 28, 2011) is an American actress. She is best known for her role in The Thundermans (2015–2018) as Chloe Thunderman. She reprised the role in the films The Thundermans Return (2024) and Clash of the Thundermans (2026), and in the spin-off series The Thundermans: Undercover (2025–present).

== Early life ==
Maya Le Clark was born in San Diego, California on March 28, 2011. Her mother, Aimee Le Zakrewski Clark, is the co-founder of Explore Counseling Group (née Caldwell–Clark), a nonprofit organization dedicated to providing affordable mental health services, and the founder of Girl Uplifters Team, an organization to support girls in uplifting themselves and others. Her older sister, Olivia, is a model and an actress.

== Career ==
Le Clark began acting at the age of four doing auditions. Her first role was in the Nickelodeon comedy television series The Thundermans (2015–2018) as Chloe Thunderman, the youngest Thunderman child. Between this time she appeared in the Nickelodeon television films Nickelodeon's Ho Ho Holiday Special (2015) and Nickelodeon's Sizzling Summer Camp Special (2017).

Le Clark later appeared in two episodes of the Nickelodeon comedy television series Knight Squad (2018–2019) as Brea, a girl who is educated by Sage. She also appeared as the child version of Cleo Cazo in the superhero film The Suicide Squad (2021).

In 2024, she reprised the role of Chloe Thunderman in the follow-up film The Thundermans Return (2024). In 2025, she starred and reprised the role of Chloe in The Thundermans: Undercover (2025–present) along original series actors Kira Kosarin and Jack Griffo who portray Phoebe Thunderman and Max Thunderman respectively.

On July 31, 2025, it was announced that Le Clark would reprise her role as Chloe Thunderman on the film Clash of the Thundermans, which premiered on Paramount+ and Nickelodeon in 2026.

== Filmography ==
Year	Title	Role	Notes
2015–2018	The Thundermans	Chloe Thunderman	Recurring role (season 3); main role (season 4)
2015	Nickelodeon's Ho Ho Holiday Special	Herself	Television special
2017	Nickelodeon's Sizzling Summer Camp Special	Herself	Television special
2018–2019	Knight Squad	Brea	2 episodes
2021	The Suicide Squad	Young Cleo	
2024	The Thundermans Return	Chloe Thunderman	Television film
2025–present	The Thundermans: Undercover	Chloe Thunderman	Main role
2026	Clash of the Thundermans	Chloe Thunderman	Television film

== Nominations ==
Year	Award	Category	Work	Result	Ref.
2025	Nickelodeon Kids Choice Awards	Favorite Female TV Star (Kids)	The Thundermans: Undercover	Nominated	
2026	Nickelodeon Kids Choice Awards	Favorite Female TV Star (Kids)	The Thundermans: Undercover	Nominated	
