= The Thundermans: Undercover =

2025 American television series

- Genre: Comedy
- Based on: The Thundermans by Jed Spingarn
- Developed by: Jed Spingarn; Sean W. Cunningham; Marc Dworkin
- Starring: Kira Kosarin; Jack Griffo; Maya Le Clark; Nathan Broxton; Kinley Cunningham
- Composer: Ron Wasserman
- Country of origin: United States
- Original language: English
- No. of seasons: 1
- No. of episodes: 26

Production
- Executive producers: Jed Spingarn; Sean W. Cunningham; Marc Dworkin; Kira Kosarin; Jack Griffo
- Producer: Richard Bullock
- Production location: Vancouver, British Columbia
- Cinematography: Joseph W. Calloway
- Editors: Jeff Wright; Nancy Morrison; Cheryl Campsmith
- Running time: 22–23 minutes
- Production companies: Thinky Boy; Dworkingham Productions; Nickelodeon Productions

Original release
- Network: Nickelodeon
- Release: January 11, 2025 – present

Related
- The Thundermans (2013–2018); The Thundermans Return (2024)

The Thundermans: Undercover is an American comedy television series developed by Jed Spingarn, Sean W. Cunningham, and Marc Dworkin, serving as a spinoff and sequel to The Thundermans (2013–2018) and The Thundermans Return (2024). The series premiered on Nickelodeon on January 11, 2025, as a sneak peek following the network's alternate broadcast of an NFL Wild Card game. It later premiered officially on January 22, 2025.

== Premise ==
Following the events of The Thundermans Return, The Thundermans: Undercover follows Phoebe and Max, who are sent undercover to handle a new threat in the seaside town of Secret Shores and bring Chloe along with them to develop her superhero talent and make friends. This new threat soon involves the mysterious villain Mastermind who is plotting to create a new incarnation of the Villain League by calling all villains to come to Secret Shores.

== Cast ==
=== Main ===
- Kira Kosarin as Phoebe Thunderman, one half of the Thunder Twins. When undercover in Secret Shores, Phoebe works as the art teacher at Secret Shores School despite being bad at art as seen in the original series. She possesses heat and freeze breath, telekinesis, and 'thunder sense'.
- Jack Griffo as Max Thunderman, one half of the Thunder Twins. When undercover in Secret Shores, Max works as the vice principal at Secret Shores School. Since he is Phoebe's twin, he has the exact same powers she has.
- Maya Le Clark as Chloe Thunderman, the youngest sister of Phoebe and Max who can teleport
- Nathan Broxton as Jinx, one of Chloe's friends in Secret Shores who is accident-prone and a quick-learner of different technologies. By "The Mastermind Unmasked" Pt. 2, Jinx learns about Chloe's superhero identity.
- Kinley Cunningham as Kombucha "Booch", one of Chloe's friends in Secret Shores who is a spiritualistic hippie that lives in a beach yurt with her family. By "The Mastermind Unmasked" Pt. 2, Kombucha learns about Chloe's superhero identity.

=== Recurring ===
- Dana Snyder as the voice of Dr. Colosso, a supervillain who is trapped in the form of a rabbit that is owned by the Thundermans. The episode "All About Steve" reveals that Dr. Colosso's first name is Ebenezer. Snyder also portrays Dr. Colosso's human form in "Love Is in the Lair".
  - Joe Echallier, Agnieszka Echallier, and Glenn Williams serve as the puppeteers of Dr. Colosso's rabbit form
- Daran Norris as Thunderford, Max, Phoebe, and Chloe's virtual assistant at their condo. The episode "Tide and Prejudice" revealed that Thunderford was known as Waterford when High Tide originally lived in the condo.
- Michael Delleva as Wayland, the manager of Splat By-The-Sea. The episode "The Max of Life" reveals that Wayland doesn't have taste buds.
- John Murphy as Superintendent Ferguson, the superintendent of all of Secret Shores schools who is known for firing anyone who disappoints him. In "Summer of Secrets", Ferguson fires Principal Taylor and becomes a temporary principal of Secret Shores School until he can find a permanent replacement.
- Ian Ho as Bryson "B.C." Chance / Mastermind, a student temporarily staying in Secret Shores who Chloe befriends. In the two-part episode "The Mastermind Unmasked", he revealed himself to be the Mastermind, a mysterious supervillain who is planning to start a new incarnation of the Villain League in Secret Shores and become the most powerful supervillain. Prior to B.C.'s true colors being revealed, Mastermind was performed by Nikolai Witschl and voiced by Darin De Paul.
- Jedidiah Goodacre as Captain Perfect / Peter Perfect, a superhero with super-agility, rope-flight abilities, and an assortment of gadgets who was dispatched to Secret Shores by Super President Kickbutt to supervise the Thunder Twins' mission smoothly
- Daniele Gaither as Super President Kickbutt, the leader of the Hero League that the Thundermans answer to
- Diego Velazquez as Billy Thunderman, the brother of Phoebe, Max, and Chloe who possesses super-speed
- Chris Tallman as Hank Thunderman, the father of Phoebe, Max, and Chloe with flight and super-strength
- Rosa Blasi as Barb Thunderman, the electrokinetic mother of Phoebe, Max, and Chloe

=== Guest ===
- Ryan Ochoa as Malware, a supervillain with a sentient Giga Gauntlet who is wanting to join Mastermind's incarnation of the Villain League
- Jennifer Spence as Principal Taylor, the principal of Secret Shores School. She gets fired in "Summer of Secrets".
- Katrina Reynolds as Adele, Jinx's mother
- Toby Berner as Randy, Kombucha's father
- Tony Alcantar as Brain Freeze, an ice cream vendor-themed villain auditioning to be part of Mastermind's Villain League whose gun induces Brain Freeze on anyone
- Audrey Whitby as Cherry Seinfield, Phoebe's best friend who still has her spark-based abilities from the reunion movie
- Lilimar Hernandez as Kitty Klaw, a cat-themed supervillain and master thief with lightning-fast cheetah powers who is auditioning to join Mastermind's incarnation of the Villain League.
- Jessica Marie Garcia as Brenda, an athletic barista and latest inhabitant to Secret Shores who Phoebe and Max try to befriend
- Max Malas as Steve, a Hero League student with the ability to create marshmallows and s'mores
- Geno Segers as High Tide, an aquatic superhero and the former protector of Secret Shores that used to live in the condo that Phoebe, Max, and Chloe moved in to
- Jeff Meacham as Principal Tad Bradford, the principal of Hiddenville High School
- Ben Francis as Stardust, a supervillain working for Master who can generate and become dust
- Christian Lagasse and Sandra Shapiro as Pop and Lock, a former breakdancing duo-turned-criminals working for Mastermind who specialize in hand-to-hand combat
- Ajay Banks as Professor Portal, a portal-generating supervillain working for Mastermind
- Kenny Ridwan as Gideon, a friend of Max
- Pyper Braun as Penny, the younger sister of Captain Perfect who is also an expert at using different gadgets
- Gabrielle Nevaeh Green as Kiefer, the lead henchman of Mastermind who serves as the Villain League's recruiter
- Jonathan Vellner as the unnamed assistant henchman of Kiefer
- Alexander Brophy as Weird Frank, a weird kid who Jinx gives his mother's radish loaf to
- Brenda Crichlow as Nana Jinx, the grandmother of Jinx
- Ryan Mah as Lazlo Chance, the founder and owner of Chance Technologies
- Helen Hong as Mrs. Wong, the proprietor of Splatburger who also owns Splat By-The-Sea
- Viola Abley as Bria, a member of the acrobatic Flip Sisters
- Anna McNulty as Lexi, a member of the acrobatic Flip Sisters
- Peter Kelamis as Cave Guardian, a long-living inhabitant of a cave beneath Secret Shores who guards the Power Amulet that can copy any superpowers
- Addison Riecke as Nora Thunderman, the sister of Phoebe, Max, Billy, and Chloe who possesses laser vision. She was studying abroad during most of the first season and showed up in person in "The Most Thunderful Time of the Year".

== Episodes ==
No.	Title	Directed by	Written by	Original release date	Prod. code
1	"Thundercover"	Trevor Kirschner	Jed Spingarn & Sean W. Cunningham & Marc Dworkin	January 11, 2025 (sneak peek); January 22, 2025 (official)	101
Max and Phoebe worry that Chloe's friends Blair and Tiff are taking advantage of her, so they go undercover in Secret Shores on a mission from Super President Kickbutt. They bring Chloe along to help her make real friends and live a normal life. Dr. Colosso joins them as a mysterious figure promises to restore his human form in exchange for a specific item. Upon arrival, Phoebe and Max begin their mission, while Chloe starts at Secret Shores School, where she befriends Booch and Jinx. Meanwhile, Dr. Colosso is tricked into obtaining a key card to a weapons vault, allowing the villain Malware to recover his sentient Giga Gauntlet. Chloe learns why she was brought to Secret Shores and teleports back to Hiddenville, just as Super President Kickbutt informs Max and Phoebe that Malware has escaped prison. Max and Phoebe track him down and fight Malware, but he captures them and traps them in a "firewall." Chloe, realizing that Blair and Tiff are taking advantage of her, returns to rescue Max and Phoebe. Together, they defeat Malware and confiscate his Giga Gauntlet. After Malware's arrest and Dr. Colosso's house arrest, Super President Kickbutt reveals an encrypted transmission from the villain Mastermind, inviting others to join a new Villain League in Secret Shores. Max, Phoebe, and Chloe decide to stay in Secret Shores to stop any new threats. Special guest stars: Chris Tallman as Hank, Rosa Blasi as Barb, Diego Velazquez as Billy Guest stars: Ryan Ochoa as Malware, Nikolai Witschl as Mastermind, Mela Piertropalo as Blair, Ivory Baker as Tiff, Daniele Gaither as President Kickbutt
2	"Faulty Powers"	Trevor Kirschner	Sean W. Cunningham & Marc Dworkin	January 22, 2025	104
During superhero training to prepare for confronting Mastermind, Chloe is accidentally hit by a gamma energy ball, which mixes with Phoebe's sunscreen and causes her to turn invisible. Thunderford scans Chloe and finds that the combination has disrupted her powers, and he works on a cure. However, Dr. Colosso can't help because he's three credits short of completing his evil medical degree. As Phoebe and Max try to control Chloe, she develops random superpowers, tapping into abilities from the entire Thunderman family. Although Max manages to fix Chloe's powers using a gamma energy ball with a reversed electromagnetic field, Thunderford warns them that Chloe will experience a new power that will affect her appearance during a party at Splat By-The-Sea. Chloe shapeshifts into a cupcake. Phoebe and Max use a clever tactic to find the cupcake, realizing it's actually Chloe. Thunderford eventually finds a cure for Chloe's condition and sends the prescription to a local super doctor. Meanwhile, Dr. Colosso gives an online speech about his graduation from Evil University Online, only to realize he was on mute the entire time. Guest star: Michael Delleva as Wayland
3	"Bummer School"	Trevor Kirschner	Sean W. Cunningham & Marc Dworkin	January 29, 2025	103
To fit in at Secret Shores, Max and Phoebe take jobs at Secret Shores School—Max becomes the vice-principal, and Phoebe becomes the art teacher, much to Chloe's surprise since Phoebe admits she's terrible at art. At the school, Max and Phoebe argue, and Principal Taylor tells Chloe about the Mascot Masc-Off, where students design a new school mascot. The old otter mascot was retired after a supposed attack by a family of otters, for which Phoebe and Max are blamed. Chloe gets Kombucha and Jinx to join the competition. When Principal Taylor shows Phoebe a resume that includes a fake claim made by Max that Phoebe spent four months in prison for sampling grapes at a supermarket, Phoebe and Max get into a fight. In the chaos, they accidentally break the narwhal mascot's head. Chloe snaps at them for their irresponsibility. After making up, Phoebe and Max enlist Dr. Colosso, who's surprisingly good at art, to fix the mascot. In the Mascot Masc-Off, the first entry is a sunscreen mascot, but Phoebe and Max manage to finish the narwhal mascot. Principal Taylor is impressed and declares it the winning design. Guest stars: Jennifer Spence as Principal Taylor, Berkley Holtrop as Sunscreen Kid
4	"The Parent Zap"	Trevor Kirschner	Jed Spingarn	February 5, 2025	102
Thunderford gives Phoebe, Max, and Chloe gadgets for their mission. Meanwhile, Phoebe and Max let Chloe, Kombucha, and Jinx watch a horror movie and eat candy, which results in Kombucha becoming hyper and Jinx getting scared. This prompts Randy and Adele, Kombucha and Jinx's parents, to want to meet Chloe. With Hank and Barb away on a mission, Max and Phoebe use the Disguise-alizer to impersonate them to keep things smooth. However, when the real Hank and Barb return, they figure out what's going on and transform into Max and Phoebe, causing chaos. Chloe, Max, and Phoebe scramble to fix the situation before their cover is blown and Chloe loses her friends. After a botched attempt, Chloe convinces Principal Taylor to speak positively about the Thundermans, allowing Kombucha and Jinx to stay friends with her. The twist: Principal Taylor was actually Dr. Colosso in disguise. Hank and Barb take the Disguise-alizer and head off to bring Billy and Nora back from the Moon, with Hank making his usual dramatic exit through the roof. Special guest stars: Chris Tallman as Hank, Rosa Blasi as Barb Guest stars: Katrina Reynolds as Adele, Toby Berner as Randy, Jennifer Spence as Principal Taylor
5	"Save the Date"	Jon Rosenbaum	Hannah Suria	February 12, 2025	105
Max avoids dish duty while dining with Phoebe and Chloe at Splat By-The-Sea. After a run-in with his surfboards, Phoebe meets Trey, a surf shop employee. She shows Max and Chloe footage of a suspicious ice cream truck in Secret Shores, and Chloe plans to help Phoebe ask Trey out. Max bets Phoebe that if she can turn off Thundergirl for a day, he'll do the dishes. Phoebe impresses Trey, while Max struggles with crime detection. After Phoebe secures a date with Trey, Max and Dr. Colosso create a fake emergency to sabotage Chloe's bet. Meanwhile, Phoebe picks out a date outfit with Thunderford's help. Max tries to trick Phoebe into becoming Thundergirl, but she stays focused on her date. At Splat By-The-Sea, Booch and Jinx search for a lost earbud. Max calls Phoebe about the ice cream truck, and Chloe leaves to check on him, assuming he's lying. They are ambushed by Brain Freeze, an ice cream villain who uses a brain-freezing gun to incapacitate them. Brain Freeze plans to brainwash Secret Shores, but Phoebe arrives just in time to destroy his hypno-sonic speakers and save the day. She heads back to her date with Trey and Max admits he'll do the dishes after losing the bet. Guest stars: Nikolai Witschl as Mastermind, Michael Delleva as Wayland, Wei Chung as Trey, Tony Alcantar as Brain Freeze
6	"Cherry Bad Things"	Jon Rosenbaum	Nora Sullivan	February 26, 2025	106
Phoebe cleans the house in preparation for her best friend Cherry's visit to Secret Shores and invites Kombucha to join her and Cherry at a high-tech spa. Kombucha only agrees after Chloe mentions the spa has massage chairs. After Kombucha and Jinx leave to visit Nana Jinx, Cherry arrives and Max is surprised to see she still has her sparkle powers. Cherry claims she got lost and ended up at the League of Heroes sandwich shop instead of HQ. Thunderford tells Phoebe they can remove Cherry's sparkle powers with the Super Undooper Power Remover Wand, which he orders using Phoebe's credit card. When the wand arrives, Phoebe learns she missed her Hero League appointment on purpose. She and Cherry agree to use the wand before Cherry heads back to Hiddenville. They meet up with Chloe and Kombucha at the spa, while Max is visited by Jinx, who wants to join his guys' night and wins him over with two VR headsets. At the spa, Phoebe and Chloe try to keep Kombucha from noticing Cherry using her powers. Meanwhile, Dr. Colosso tries to sabotage Max and Jinx's VR game with darts, but keeps missing. At the spa, the nail polish machine startles Cherry, causing her to accidentally destroy the spa's control panel, triggering its privacy mode. Phoebe freezes Kombucha and comes up with a plan, while Dr. Colosso continues missing his dart shots at Max and Jinx. Phoebe has Cherry use her sparkle powers to cut through a door and free them just as Kombucha thaws out. Phoebe and Cherry return to the condo, covering up their night, and Phoebe finally persuades Cherry to give up her sparkle powers. Once that is done, Phoebe and Cherry do a "best friends, no powers, never going to a spa again" selfie. Guest star: Audrey Whitby as Cherry
7	"Not So Fast and Furious"	Wendy Faraone	Scott Taylor & Wesley Jermaine Johnson	March 5, 2025	107
Max sends Chloe on a mission to run international errands while Phoebe learns that Kitty Klaw, a lightning-fast supervillain with cheetah powers, is causing havoc in Secret Shores. Chloe leaves to bring Billy to help fight Kitty Klaw. Billy agrees to assist, but Max sends him on errands instead. Meanwhile, Chloe, Kombucha, and Jinx sneak into Secret Shores School for a ghost hunt so Jinx can join the Paranormal Club. Billy causes an avalanche in Chile and regrets it after a snowman was destroyed. This causes him to retire from being a hero. Max tries to convince him otherwise, but Billy remains firm. Phoebe tracks Kitty Klaw to an abandoned zoo, where she's captured and tied up by Kitty Klaw. Max, unable to convince Billy to help, runs to save Phoebe himself. Chloe pretends to be the ghost to scare off the Paranormal Club members, while Billy arrives just in time to save Max and Phoebe. Billy defeats Kitty Klaw, trapping her in her own device. Back at the condo, Billy is thanked for his help as Max asks for him or Chloe to help him get hot cocoa from Switzerland. Chloe heads to Switzerland for hot cocoa, leaving Max behind, while Phoebe and Max toast to Billy's victory over Kitty Klaw. Special guest star: Diego Velazquez as Billy Guest stars: Lilimar Hernandez as Kitty Klaw, Ellexis Wejr as Morgana, Billy Christos Jr. as Horatio, Casey Trotter as Bob
8	"For Your Spies Only"	Wendy Faraone	Angela Yarbrough	March 12, 2025	108
As Phoebe and Max prepare for Parent-Teacher Night at Secret Shores School, they forbid Chloe from having friends over even when she shows them a presentation about it with Thunderford's help. Chloe has Kombucha and Jinx over behind Phoebe and Max's back and passes Dr. Colosso off as her pet rabbit. At Secret Shores School, Phoebe and Max are cautioned by Principal Taylor about Superintendent Ferguson who is known for firing teachers that don't impress him earning him the nickname "Fiery Ferguson" as seen when he fires a lunch lady who made bad lemonade. In an attempt to impress Superintendent Ferguson at Principal Taylor's suggestion, Max has Phoebe do an art presentation and advises her not to fail or else they'll lose their jobs and the Hero League will take them off their undercover assignment. Meanwhile, Kombucha gives Dr. Colosso a makeover as Jinx accidentally stumbles into the Condo's Air Lair where he suspects that spies live in the condo. At Secret Shores School, Max plans to use telekinesis to help Phoebe with her art program. Jinx arrives wearing a suit to help detect evil spies. Due to Jinx mistaking the parent of Ricky Phillips who is dressed as a pirate for a real pirate, he throws a yarn at Mr. Phillips. This ends up causing Mr. Phillips to fall onto Phoebe's pottery peddle causing the clay sculpture to explode onto Max and everyone to get away from the explosion. After Jinx leaves, Phoebe and Max start to reprimand Chloe as Superintendent Ferguson returns. Despite his mishap, Superintendent Ferguson is impressed with the clay outline of Max and declares their jobs safe... this time. Chloe talks Phoebe and Max into reprimanding her as she claims that she helped save their jobs while asking for their help. Back at the condo, Phoebe and Max convince Jinx that the spies have moved out of the condo as Phoebe and Max find Dr. Colosso in his new look. Guest stars: Jennifer Spence as Principal Taylor, John Murphy as Superintendent Ferguson, Byron Brisco as Mr. Phillips
9	"No Friend in Sight"	Trevor Kirschner	Samantha Martin	March 19, 2025	111
As Chloe tries to have Me Time by watching the next episode of Glove Island, she keeps getting interrupted by Max and Phoebe. Chloe suggests that they should start making their own friends to do stuff with like what they did in Hiddenville. They end up befriending an athletic barista named Brenda, who is surprised that Phoebe and Max are siblings. Phoebe and Max start to compete for Brenda's attention. Meanwhile, Chloe has to deal with a pelican that got into the condo. With the Sports Center hosting an event involving Who-Tein Shakes endorsed by celebrities and Phoebe wanting to take Brenda to a "book club", Max states that Brenda will have to make a choice. Brenda wants to go with Max as the Who-Tein Shakes event is a one-night event, while she can talk with Phoebe about Russian novels tomorrow. At the Sports Center, Max and Brenda enjoy some Who-Tein Shakes as Phoebe got into the event as a caterer as part of her plot to steal Brenda back from Max. Meanwhile, Dr. Colosso surprises Chloe stating that the pelican is Dr. Colosso's friend Barry from his poker group, as he reminds Barry that poker night is on Wednesday while Barry leaves. Back at the Sports Center, Max and Phoebe's competition for Brenda's friendship reaches the point where Brenda takes a stand by stating that they have each other as compatible friends. When Phoebe and Max ask if they are there for each other, they then shout to the sky "No"! Guest stars: Michael Delleva as Wayland, Jessica Marie Garcia as Brenda, Austin Trapp as Jim, Omotayo Durojaiye as Tori, Dreyden Free as Buff Guy
10	"All About Steve"	Phill Lewis	Dan Serafin	March 26, 2025	109
Billy calls his siblings to tell them that he was at the Hero League Pickleball Game, and has met a new friend named Steve who has amazing powers and would be perfect as his sidekick on the T-Force. The next day, Billy introduces Steve. Meanwhile at Splat By-The-Sea, Jinx informs Chloe and Kombucha that he has a crush on a cool girl who lives by the ocean. At the condo, Max and Phoebe talk to Billy about his wanting to enlist Steve into the T-Force. Phoebe and Max state that they need a quick demonstration of Steve's powers before they can finalize their decision. Steve shows off his "s'more blast" ability. Phoebe and Max talk about why they can't let a s'more-powered boy join the T-Force as they will be a laughingstock in the Hero League. Phoebe and Max then take the opportunity to list the pros and cons of Steve joining the T-Force. Billy lists s'more-related stuff and filling the void left by Nora as the pros while not listing any cons. Max begins his plan to lie by telling Billy that the Hero League teams are allowed a limit of seven members which only co-captains know about. Outside, Steve burns a marshmallow as he plans to get rid of either Phoebe or Max in order to make room for a spot on the T-Force. He places the Air Lair in lockdown mode as his mega marshmallow gets ready to explode. Meanwhile, Jinx points Chloe and Kombucha towards the new girl who he met at the skate park and makes Jinx want to be a better Jinx. Chloe teleports into the Air Lair and states that she told them that their plan to not be honest with Billy would blow up in their face. She manages to evacuate Phoebe and Max from the Air Lair. Billy learns about what Steve did to them and is advised by Max to use his super-speed to visit Nora at any time as he runs off to tell Nora. Phoebe and Max then take Steve to jail. Special guest star: Diego Velazquez as Billy Guest stars: Michael Delleva as Wayland, Max Malas as Steve, Halle Lauridsen as Ella
11	"Tide and Prejudice"	Trevor Kirschner	Sean W. Cunningham & Marc Dworkin	April 2, 2025	112
Phoebe, Max, and Chloe meet the aquatic superhero High Tide who used to live at the condo and was the writer of the book Tide and Prejudice as he learns that they were assigned the condo by the Hero League. High Tide states that he was trapped inside a giant clam and befriended a pearl named Pearly. Phoebe and Max shoot down Chloe's suggestion to inform Super President Kickbutt about High Tide's return. Meanwhile, Kombucha and Jinx are working on a petition in freeing the water. Back at the condo, High Tide is reminded by Phoebe that she, Max, and Phoebe were assigned to this condo by Super President Kickbutt. High Tide wants them to return to Hiddenville. Phoebe and Max's attempt to reason with him where he pretends to understand and walks out. Meanwhile at Secret Shores School, Kombucha and Max begin their mass protest by pouring organic industrial cement mix into the water fountain which doesn't go well. Phoebe and Max get a notification that there is a threat of an indoor flood at Secret Shores School as Chloe recalls that Kombucha and Jinx are at the school. High Tide enters stating that he will prove that he's the true protector of Secret Shores by summoning some starfish from his special seashell to latch onto their faces. He arrives where he uses his harpoon on the pipes and covers Kombucha and Jinx's eyes with his Super Starfish Attack. Dr. Colosso uses the skills he learned when was the lead soprano in the Villain League's hit musical Illegally Blonde to get the starfish off of them. Super President Kickbutt calls stating that High Tide was sighted in Secret Shores and needs to be brought in for his evaluation immediately due to his disastrous saves. Phoebe, Max, and Chloe head to Secret Shores School. Chloe advises them to combine their telekinesis and freeze breath on High Tide. This plan works as Chloe teleports the frozen High Tide and Pearly to the Hero League and then returns to turn off the water valve to the whole building. Max frees Kombucha and Jinx and call up Dr. Colosso to use his singing pitch to get the starfish off their faces. When Jinx asks where the singing came from, Kombucha states "It was the voice of an angel". Guest stars: Daniele Gaither as Super President Kickbutt, Geno Segers as High Tide, John Murphy as Superintendent Ferguson (credit only), Ariah Lee as Maisy
12	"Prank You, Next"	Kira Kosarin	Chris Tallman	April 9, 2025	113
Max works on the school budget and works on Secret Shores School budget as Chloe assumes that he is buying a golf cart. Once Max had pre-ordered the golf cart after cutting the science club budget, Chloe speaks out to her fellow students against Max's actions. Her plan to have Superintendent Ferguson deal with him doesn't work as he was impressed with the golf cart. After Max claims that sacrifices must be made, he sits in a cream pie that was placed in the cart. After more pranks occur with a demand to give the dough back to the school clubs or else, Max calls in his old principal Tad Bradford to help find the prankster. Meanwhile, Phoebe learns that Kombucha and Jinx have found a lone speckled turtle egg and Phoebe is enlisted to watch over it while Kombucha and Jinx are looking for its mother. Once the training is done, Max looks for pranks as Chloe makes off with the golf cart and places it on the roof. This causes Max to quit the mission. After Max cleared out his office, Chloe comes clean about pranking him and teleports the golf cart off the roof. When she can't get her butt off the seat due to mega-strength glue, Max admitted that he figured out that Chloe was the prankster yesterday. Chloe reveals that she placed a towel on the seat and threatens to unleash the spiders and bring the prank war to the condo if Max doesn't return the golf cart and gives the school clubs their money back. As for Bradford, he found out that the money envelope he received from Max was filled with sneezing powder. Guest stars: Michael Delleva as Wayland, John Murphy as Superintendent Ferguson, Jeff Meacham as Principal Bradford
13	"From Dust Till Dawn"	Phill Lewis	Dicky Murphy	April 16, 2025	110
As Phoebe and Max give leadership training to Chloe the moment when Mastermind attacks, they learn about her science club field trip that involves seeing a race space geode. Phoebe and Max are told by Thunderford that Mastermind's Villain League candidate Stardust is planning something sinister as he gives a positive compliment towards Phoebe's leadership book. Phoebe ropes Max into chaperoning the field trip. Later that night, Thunderford sends a text to the Thundermans that Stardust is heading their way as Phoebe and Max send Chloe with the science club to make sure nobody walks in on them dealing with Stardust as part of a leadership practice. When Stardust arrives through the vent with his dust transformation abilities, he places the space geode for his anti-matter transducer in order to make a black hole if Secret Shores doesn't bow down to Mastermind. With Stacey left in charge, the Thunder Twins regress back to their civilian form as the science club returns with the anti-matter transducer. Max and Phoebe work to drain the anti-matter transducer at the Air Lair where a mishap leads them to use the Twin Power to overheat the space geode. Stardust returns to the museum causing Chloe to put her leadership skills to the test where the science club provide a trick enabling Chloe to suck him up in a vacuum. Displeased with the defeat of Brain Freeze, Kitty Claw, and Stardust, Mastermind plans to find out who the superheroes are and make them pay. Guest stars: Nikolai Witschl as Mastermind, Victoria Lily Quinn as Stacy, Ben Francis as Stardust, Ariah Lee as Maisy
14	"Summer of Secrets"	Victor Gonzalez	Hannah Suria	July 17, 2025	115
Super President Kickbutt asks the Thundermans about the secrets they kept from each other is tearing apart their family and putting Secret Shores in danger. She asks how they could let something like that happen. Arriving at Secret Shores School six weeks earlier, Phoebe, Max, and Chloe run into Superintendent Ferguson, who revealed that he fired Principal Taylor and will be the temporary principal until he can hire someone else who might be fired. While also noticing Chloe's unexplained absence, he makes her make up her absences in summer school and also has Max work as the history teacher after firing the previous summer school history teacher. Kombucha and Jinx arrive to join Chloe upon signing up for summer school as she tries to befriend a student named Bryson "B.C." Chance, who went to boarding school in Paris. Meanwhile, Phoebe as Thundergirl contends with the latest supervillain, Pop and Lock. She receives aid from a superhero named Captain Perfect. Upon not finding Captain Perfect in the database, Phoebe calls Super President Kickbutt, who states that there is no Captain Perfect. With Ferguson stating that Chloe needs to pass history or be held back, Max has B.C. tutor Chloe. This proves to be a success, while Kombucha and Jinx assume that Chloe has a crush on B.C. Upon unmasking themselves, Thundergirl and Captain Perfect defeat Pop and Lock. What Phoebe doesn't know is that Captain Perfect tells a mysterious contact that he has won Thunder Girl's trust and that their plan with her is working. Guest stars: Daniele Gaither as Super President Kickbutt, John Murphy as Superintendent Ferguson, Jedidiah Goodacre as Captain Perfect, Ian Ho as B.C., Christian Lagasse as Pop, Sandra Shapiro as Lock
15	"I Know What You Did This Summer"	Victor Gonzalez	Nora Sullivan	July 17, 2025	116
As Phoebe continues working with Captain Perfect in secret, Max starts to get suspicious when working at a summer school. Thundergirl and Captain Perfect run into the latest supervillain Professor Portal who is attempting to do a diamond heist for Mastermind. Max learns of Captain Perfect and starts to get jealous. He proceeds to secretly track Captain Perfect and hears that he is the target after he comes out of the Principal's Office at Secret Shores School. Meanwhile, B.C. invites Chloe to attend a launch party for the Chance Phone 7 at Splat By-The-Sea as Kombucha and Jinx are protesting the towers built by Chance Technologies that is keeping the bats awake. Chloe balances both events, which led to Kombucha and Jinx seeing Chloe hanging out with B.C. When Max finally confronts Thundergirl and Captain Perfect, it is then revealed that Captain Perfect is a superhero agent for the Hero League who was sent by the Hero League to make sure their plans to keep Secret Shores safe from Mastermind doesn't go off with a hitch. A call to Super President Kickbutt corroborates this as she states that they must impress Captain Perfect or their time in Secret Shores will come to an end. Guest stars: Daniele Gaither as Super President Kickbutt, Michael Delleva as Wayland, Jedidiah Goodacre as Captain Perfect, Ian Ho as B.C., Ajay Banks as Professor Portal, Amro Majzoub as Janitor
16	"The Summer I Turned Giddy"	Wendy Faraone	Wesley Jermaine Johnson & Scott Taylor	July 24, 2025	117
Now that Max and Phoebe know of Captain Perfect's reason for being in Secret Shores, they now must be ready for his test. Jealous that Phoebe and Captain Perfect are still going on missions together, Max calls Gideon to Secret Shores to be his sidekick as Gideon uses the name of "Giddler". Because Thunderford can't detect any useful skulls in Gideon, Max tries to make him bigger with the resize-alizer and makes him small enough for Max to have a hard time finding him. Meanwhile, Kombucha and Jinx accept Chloe's apology for being with B.C. as they admit that they were being harsh on him. During an event at Splat By-The-Sea, B.C. admits that he is embarrassed of what his father does for work at Chance Technologies. With B.C.'s dad Lazlo being the rich one in the family, Chloe, Kombucha, and Jinx agree with B.C. that Lazlo is the worst, as B.J. joins them in toilet papering Lazlo's yacht. After admitting his mistake to Phoebe and Captain Perfect, Max was able to find Gideon with the glow stick from his survival kit. After Gideon is restored to normal and quits being Max's superhero sidekick, Captain Perfect attempts to include this mishap in his report, only for Phoebe and Max to shrink his tablet. Guest stars: Michael Delleva as Wayland, Jedidiah Goodacre as Captain Perfect, Ian Ho as B.C., Kenny Ridwan as Gideon
17	"A Midsummer Night's Scheme"	Wendy Faraone	Dan Serafin	July 24, 2025	118
Captain Perfect tells Phoebe, Max, and Chloe that he can't do any team-building exercises with Max and Phoebe due to him having to help his younger sister Penny overcome her evil phase. Having been through the same evil phase before, Max offers to help Captain Perfect with Penny. Penny is beamed into the Air Lair by Captain Perfect as Max works to help Penny get over her evil phase, which doesn't go well at first when she hears that Mastermind is using an abandoned toy factory called Krelman's Toy Co. to recruit henchmen. Dr. Colosso gives Max an evil makeover to infiltrate the group and encounters their leader, Kiefer, who leads the recruits in a plot to destroy Splat By-The-Sea. Meanwhile, Phoebe covers for Max's history class and tries to help Chloe do a promposal to B.C., which goes comically awry. After some ranting from Chloe, Phoebe makes it up to her by having B.C. come over to their condo and enable Chloe a second chance to invite him to the dance. During the villains' mission, Max talks Penny out of being evil upon mentioning his own villain phase. Watching the events from afar with another henchman, Kiefer fires the mind-controlling Chip-Chunker device into Max's neck as she plans to turn him evil. Guest stars: Jedidiah Goodacre as Captain Perfect, Ian Ho as B.C., Pyper Braun as Penny, Gabrielle Nevaeh Green as Kiefer, Jonathan Vellner as Henchman Assistant, DeAndre Baptiss as Pizza Boy, Isla Sunar as Bridget
18	"Cruel Summer"	Wendy Faraone	Jed Spingarn	July 31, 2025	119
Continuing from the last episode, the Thunder Twins thwarting the supervillain Baron von Boomerang. Captain Perfect files his final report to Super President Kickbutt. She informed Captain perfect that she is impressed and allows the Thunder Twins and Chloe to continue their mission in Secret Shores to take down Mastermind. Meanwhile at Secret Shores School, Kombucha helps Chloe prepare her slow-motion entrance that she'll do with B.C. at the Summer School Dance. Jinx's mother Adele misunderstands Jinx's claim on who he is going with and thinks that Jinx is talking about her. A break-in later occurs at the Secret Shores power plant. Because Dr. Colosso has been writing Max's sick notes to excuse him from his vice-principal duties, Max is to blame. Meanwhile at Splat By-The Sea, Chloe and Kombucha work on getting Booch to tell his mother the truth by enlisting Nana Jinx only for Nana Jinx to get misunderstood as well. Max flees after Captain Perfect tries to arrest him. He arrives at the abandoned Krel's Toy Co. where Kiefer activates the Chip-Chunker in order to control him. Back at Splat By-The-Sea, Jinx finally tells his mother and Nana Jinx the truth that he is actually going to the Secret Shores Dance with Jinx as a friend. Thunder Girl and Captain Perfect break into the hideout after being told of it by Penny. Using the Perfect Pulser, Thunder Girl hits Max enough to disable the Chip-Chucker as Kiefer and her fellow criminals get away. In the aftermath of the fight, Max's partnership with Phoebe is strained as he walks away. Guest stars: Jedidiah Goodacre as Captain Perfect, Ian Ho as B.C., Katrina Reynolds as Adele, Gabrielle Nevaeh Green as Kiefer, Jonathan Vellner as Henchman Assistant, Brenda Crichlow as Nana Jinx
19	"Endless Summer"	Wendy Faraone	Sean W. Cunningham & Marc Dworkin	July 31, 2025	120
Continuing from the last episode in light of Max and Phoebe's partnership break-up, Max sneaks into the Air Lair and steals some of the cool gadgets. Having heard about Max "going rogue", Super President Kickbutt assigns Captain Perfect to be Phoebe's new partner. Arriving at Krel's Toy Co., Max "officially auditions" by showing off the Hero League gadgets like using the Animalizer where he turns Keifer's fellow henchman Lonny into a crab. Having gotten a call from Mastermind about superheroes infiltrating the hideout, Kiefer gives him the status report on the recruitment and informs Mastermind that she'll find them. Max leads Keifer and her fellow henchmen to the Thundermans' condo where they managed to trap Phoebe and Captain Perfect. Meanwhile at Splat By-The-Sea, Chloe gets nervous around B.C. as Kombucha and Jinx help her overcome it. Because Wayland is the only one there, B.C. calls his dad Lazlo Chance who gets everyone to attend the Summer School Dance. While the other henchmen are busy, Max reveals that he only turned evil to get his hands on the Chip-Chucker. Keifer uses the Chip-Chucker on Captain Perfect. Meanwhile at Splat By-The-Sea, Superintendent Ferguson plays a slow song and Lazlo goes to answer a phone call as Chloe is still nervous about her dance with B.C. Upon entering the photo booth teleporting home to ask Phoebe for advice, Chloe changes into her superhero appearance and helps fight the henchmen. With help from Dr. Colosso, the henchmen are defeated and teleported to the Hero League while Captain Perfect is freed from the Chip-Chucker. Super President Kickbutt where she learns what happened and states that Keifer and her fellow henchmen are getting their memories erased. Chloe returns to Splat By-The-Sea and dances with B.C. until Kombucha and Jinx announce that there is proof that there's a teleporting superhero among them. After Phoebe and Captain Perfect part ways, Max tells Thunderford that the Chip-Chucker's signal was traced to Lazlo Chance. Knowing that Lazlo is Mastermind, Phoebe and Max plan to tell Chloe that B.C.'s dad is Mastermind as they are left deciding if Chloe should be informed of it. Guest stars: Michael Delleva as Wayland, Daniele Gaither as Super President Kickbutt, John Murphy as Superintendent Ferguson, Jedidiah Goodacre as Captain Perfect, Ian Ho as B.C., Nikolai Witschl as Mastermind, Gabrielle Nevaeh Green as Kiefer, Ryan Mah as Lazlo Chance, Jonathan Vellner as Henchman Assistant, Briton T. Maxwell as Henchman #2, Jesse Miller as Henchman #3
20	"The Max of Life"	Trevor Kirschner	Jed Spingarn	September 10, 2025	114
Max states to Phoebe and Chloe that the latest Superhero Sizzle List came out and he's not on it ever since the Thunder Twins went undercover. In addition, the Super Hair Gel company has given Max's endorsement to a Supe named Haircules. When Chloe and Max arrive at Splat By-The-Sea, Wayland states that it's sandwich stacking season which he invented where people can stack as many sandwiches on their heads without them falling off. Whoever wins gets a sandwich named after them on the menu. Last year's winner was Kombucha who had landed "Booch's BLT" on the menu as something that Kombucha likes outside of tater tots and fries as her version of BLT is beets, lentils, and tofu. Max decides to enter the contest. Meanwhile at Secret Shores School, Phoebe saves a distracted Jinx from two accidents with the latest one leading to the destruction of the bust of Secret Shores' founder J. Herbert Secret. Now Jinx plans to pay back Phoebe by owing his life to her like how Molph Zendick: Overlord of the Space Force did to the red knight in "The Return of the Space King". Max manages to stack 15 sandwiches on his head which beat Kombucha's record much to the dismay of Chloe and Kombucha. Chloe figures out that Max used his powers and scolds him for ruining Kombucha's hangout. Because of Rule 31-30, Wayland can't have both Booch's BLT and The Max of Life on the menu according to a recording from Mrs. Wong. Chloe plans to beat Max's record so that Booch's BLT can be re-added to the menu. Inspired by the design of Molph Zendrick, Phoebe has Dr. Colosso pose as Molph Zendrick to trick Jinx into cancelling the life debt to Phoebe. The next day, Chloe and Max face off in the sandwich stacking. Chloe wins and the spectatators are not pleased with the reinstatement of Booch's BLT. Later that night, Phoebe is shown footage of Chloe's victory as they find out that Max actually helped Chloe win even though he won't admit that he did the right thing. Guest stars: Michael Delleva as Wayland, Zenon Brown as Angry Fan, Denzel Onaba as Male Fan, Hudsynn Grace Kennedy as Female Fan
21	"Love Is in the Lair"	Siobhan Devine	Charlie Fellows	September 17, 2025	121
With the evidence that Lazlo Chance could be Mastermind, Phoebe and Max plan to get Chloe to get close to B.C. As Thunderford hacks into Chance Technologies to find any footage of Lazlo being Mastermind, Phoebe and Max find that Mrs. Wong is in town visiting Splat By-The-Sea and worry that she might out them as superheroes. Mrs. Wong states that she will keep their secrets safe if she can spend her duration at their beach condo. Meanwhile, Chloe is shown the photo of the teleportation in the photo booth by Kombucha and Jinx as they suspect that Superintendent Ferguson is the suspect....especially since they found a cape and mask in his office. After Mrs. Wong botches Thunderford's chances to do surveillance on Chance Technologies, Phoebe uses the Animalizer on Dr. Colosso to turn him back to his human form and distract Mrs. Wong where they both planned to get married. Meanwhile, Chloe, Kombucha, and Jinx decide not to go ahead of exposing Superintendent Ferguson only to discover that the cape and mask help hide his work as Count Frappucino in the opera performance of "The Barista of Napoli". It is soon discovered that Dr. Colosso took a liking to Mrs. Wong because he thought she was rich and to make Max jealous causing the wedding to be cancelled as Mrs. Wong mentions that she went broke after trying to launch Splat Under-The-Sea. Mrs. Wong relents on keeping Phoebe and Max's secret when Dr. Colosso threatens to mention the Splat Under-The-Sea incident. After entrusting Wayland with Splat By-The-Sea and an incident with the food tubes being filled with Max's bees that chased Mrs. Wong away, Dr. Colosso is later returned to his rabbit form by Phoebe. Guest stars: Helen Hong as Mrs. Wong, Michael Delleva as Wayland, John Murphy as Superintendent Ferguson, Meena Mann as News Reporter
22	"She's All Splat"	Siobhan Devine	Scott Taylor & Wesley Jermaine Johnson	September 24, 2025	122
Billy is back in town as Phoebe, Max, and Chloe show him Splat By-The-Sea. Cherry is also in town training to be Splat By-The-Sea's manager. Because of her bad training and the reviews that Wayland is getting about Cherry's nametag ending up in their soup, Max helps Cherry out by faking a date with her to get discounted food. Meanwhile, Billy joins Chloe, Kombucha, and Jinx in practicing for the Splat-A-Gories competition where Billy keeps getting all the questions wrong as Chloe is reluctant to kick Billy off the team. Kombucha and Jinx reveal that the winners of Splat-A-Gories will become VITs (short for Very Important Tubers) where they will get a private table with the Golden Tube that drops food that is still hot. Max and Cherry's fake dating relationship fools Wayland and surprises Phoebe. Meanwhile, Chloe tries Kombucha's "compliment sandwich" idea on Billy which does not go well. She would later learn about their real date at Secret Shores School after unfreezing Dr. Colosso. Meanwhile, Billy shows up to support Chloe's team called "The Big Brain Theory" while mistaking poison oak for a four-leaf clover and admits that he wanted to be on the team because he missed Chloe. When she allows Billy back on the team, Wayland reveals the categories which Billy actually has good knowledge of. This enables "The Big Brain Theory" to win as they end up getting the Golden Tube table and burn their mouths on the hot French fries. Eventually Max and Cherry realise they truly like each other and go on a real date. When Phoebe confronts them, Cherry states that this dating got her out of the managing position. She ends the dating with Max upon seeing that she became a better liar than him and plans to become a Hollywood actress. Special guest star: Diego Velazquez as Billy Guest stars: Audrey Whitby as Cherry, Michael Delleva as Wayland, Brittany Mocca as Angry Customer
23	"Party All the Crime"	Trevor Kirschner	Christy Stratton	October 1, 2025	123
Chloe's 13th birthday is coming up. Billy shows up and read the notes that Hank and Barb left in his pockets stating that they will not be able to attend due to an emergency mission to Atlantis. While surprised that Chloe hasn't returned to Hiddenville for her birthday party, Kombucha and Jinx plan to throw their own party after they are done with the Toys for Tots donation at Splat By-The-Sea. Phoebe, Max, and Billy work to plan a birthday party for Chloe while planning to carry on without their parents. While Max plans some mini-games and had brought over a Time-Out Whistle from Metroberg, Phoebe plans to have some party performers entertain and the athletic Flip Sisters (consisting of Bria and Lexi) win her audition. When the stuff for the birthday party is stolen, Phoebe and Max learn from Dr. Colosso that the Flip Sisters were responsible as Billy is sent to warn Chloe on where they are going to strike next. The Flip Sisters rob the "Toys for Tots" charity while using the Time-Out Whistle to freeze everyone in place. The Thunder Twins show up in headphones where they take back the Time-Out Whistle and freeze the Flip Sisters. Billy and Chloe are then unfrozen as Chloe teleports the frozen Flip Sisters away to be detained by the Hero League while Billy uses his super-speed to make the tots delivery faster as Wayland, Kombucha, and Jinx go to retrieve the forced out customers. Special guest star: Diego Velazquez as Billy Guest stars: Michael Delleva as Wayland, Viola Abley as Bria, Anna McNulty as Lexi
24	"The Mastermind Unmasked Part 1"	Trevor Kirschner	Nora Sullivan	October 8, 2025	125
Phoebe and Max watch a surveillance of Lazlo Chance being Mastermind when he enters a secret room which Thunderford mentions that they need a biometric cypher ring that Lazlo and B.C. have. Chloe is shown a three person friendship sweater that Kombucha and Jinx have made as B.C. informs them that he is transferring to Secret Shores School. Chloe informs Phoebe and Max of this as they come up with a plan to steal B.C.'s ring in order to get into Lazlo's secret room. Though Chloe notes that they will be returning to Hiddenville when Mastermind is defeated and secretly hides it from Phoebe and Max when she succeeds. However, Thunderford detected the ring in the fireplace. Chloe is confronted about this by Phoebe and Max who place a power-sapping anklet on her as Hank, Barb, and Billy are summoned to assist in this confrontation. When Chloe admits that she didn't want to leave Hiddenville, Hank and Barb ground her as they take Chloe away. With Dr. Colosso providing the distraction for the Chance Technologies employees, the Thunder Twins sneak in as exterminators. Billy is called home as he and his parents try to impress Chloe with an improvised yacht party. After breaking free from the power-sapping anklet, Chloe sneaks off to warn B.C. about his father being Mastermind. When the Thunder Twins confront Mastermind and defeat him, they find a Chip-Chucker on Lazlo. Chloe ends up learning too late that B.C. is the real Mastermind when she warns him. Special guest stars: Chris Tallman as Hank, Rosa Blasi as Barb, Diego Velazquez as Billy Guest stars: Ian Ho as B.C., Ryan Mah as Lazlo Chance, Odessa Rojan as Employee
25	"The Mastermind Unmasked Part 2"	Trevor Kirschner	Dan Serafin	October 15, 2025	126
Continuing from the last episode, B.C. as Mastermind plans to use Chloe in his revenge on the world upon his father ignoring him when Chance Technologies was established. With Kombucha and Jinx as his prisoners, Mastermind blackmails her into getting him the Power Amulet from a nearby cave. Following the truth about Lazlo, Phoebe and Max are visited by Hank, Barb, and Billy where they learn what happened. With the Power Amulet in his control, Mastermind hacks into the condo to affect the rest of the Thundermans with giggle gas. This was thwarted when Billy forms a tornado to get rid of it. Chloe meets the Cave Guardian and states that she only wants to Power Amulet to save her friends. She gets the amulet and returns to Mastermind who has placed the Chip-Chucker on Kombucha and Jinx. Using the powers from the Power Amulet, Mastermind teleports away with Kombucha and Jinx as the rest of the Thundermans arrive. With the Power Amulet enabling him to copy any powers, Mastermind begins his plans of revenge by copying every superpower on Earth. The Thundermans show up as the kids get ahold of the Power Amulet while Thunderman and Electress fight Mastermind. After freeing Kombucha and Jinx from the Chip-Chucker at Secret Shores School, Chloe reveals her superhero secret to them. Then Chloe lures Mastermind to the same cave. When the Power Amulet is removed, Mastermind loses his powers and a cave-in destroys the Power Amulet as the Thundermans take B.C. away. After Billy tells Kombucha and Jinx not to tell their secret to anyone, Super President Kickbutt arrives to congratulate the Thundermans on capturing Mastermind. However, she got contacted by the Cave Guardian who informed her that the Power Amulet's destruction has spread its powers to some people in Secret Shores where half of them are using them for evil causing Phoebe, Max, and Chloe to remain in Secret Shores to take on the new supervillains. Dr. Colosso was among those affected as he gains the power of flight. Special guest stars: Chris Tallman as Hank, Rosa Blasi as Barb, Diego Velazquez as Billy Guest stars: Daniele Gathier as Super President Kickbutt, Ian Ho as B.C., Peter Kelamis as Cave Guardian
26	"The Most Thunderful Time of the Year"	Trevor Kirschner	Samantha Martin	December 17, 2025	124
During the Christmas season in Hiddenville, Hank, Barb, and Billy are decorating their house. Chloe teleports herself, Phoebe, and Max into their house. Hank mentioned that Nora's abroad travel has them guarding someone who is implied to be Santa Claus. Dr. Colosso was revealed to have stowed away as Chloe learns about the Thunderman Christmas Story Slam where the best story told will have the one who told it placing the star on top of the Christmas tree. Knowing that Phoebe and Max have ruined some holidays, Chloe wants the Christmas Story Slam returned.: Billy's story prelude about a left-alone child battling burglars on Christmas as Barb mentioning that there was already a story like that called Home Alone.; Phoebe's story is a musical tale called "Candy Canes by the Sea" takes place in the 1940s at the titular restaurant. A charming waitress (portrayed by Phoebe) is told by a fellow waitress (portrayed by Kombucha) that evil real estate tycoon D.R. Colosso. She told Phoebe that her busboy Billy was sent to the bank with the money to buy the property only to lose the envelope when he stopped to tie his shoes which he realized don't have laces. D.R. Colosso (portrayed by Dr. Colosso) and his underling (portrayed by Max) shows up as D.R. Colosso dares Phoebe to come up with the money by midnight or else the property is his. Two patrons (portrayed by Hank and Barb) suggest they throw a Christmas party and raise money to save Phoebe's restaurant. They are unaware that Colosso's underling stole the money from Billy and that the underling learned that Colosso lied about sending the money to the orphanage that he rescued the underling from. During the party, Colosso arrives where Phoebe is short of the payment. Phoebe then does a togetherness-themed song as Colosso's underling quits and returns the money that Billy lost while Colosso is ejected from the property.; Billy does a second attempt about an elf raised by humans only for Barb to mention that he described Elf.; Max's story is "Clash of the Clauses" where Santa Claus (portrayed by Hank) is announcing his retirement. As Santa Claus and Mrs. Claus (portrayed by Barb) state that Chloe Claus too young to drive the sleigh and Nora Claus is on the Raindeer Rodeo Circuit, Max Claus, Phoebe Claus, and Billy Claus want to become his heir as the Easter Bunny (portrayed by Dr. Colosso) tells Billy to back off from his job. Santa Claus chooses Phoebe as his heir as Max Claus has a "trick up his chimney". At Santa's Workshop manned by two Christmas elves (portrayed by Kombucha and Jinx), Phoebe only found a few nice children while the rest were naughty due to minor offenses. Max will not let Phoebe get away with this and freezes her. Having saved Christmas, Max breaks out into a musical number.; Billy's third attempt involves a green hairy guy who hates Christmas and wants to steal it only for Barb to not disappoint Max and not mentioned that he described How the Grinch Stole Christmas.; Chloe's story is "Sandy the Sandman". Once upon a time in Secret Shores, a heat wave makes Phoebe and Max too hot to stay cool or pay for someone to get the air conditioner fixed. Chloe joins Kombucha and Jinx in building a sandman (a beach version of a snowman) named Sandy. Kombucha adds a hat to Sandy so that he doesn't get sunburn as they use a hat that magically blew in. When the hat is placed on top of him, Sandy (portrayed by Billy) comes to life in front of everyone. As Kombucha and Jinx look for more hats, Sandy asks Chloe, Max, and Phoebe about the Christmas things. Max manipulates Sandy into fanning him. Then Phoebe manipulates Sandy into fixing the air conditioner. Chloe gets annoyed with Phoebe and Max using him as their holiday minion as their fighting over him results in Sandy's hat coming off and losing its magic. Chloe brings the story to the end as she compares it to how Phoebe and Max ruined Christmas.; Hank and Barb declare that the winner of the Christmas Story Slam is only for Phoebe and Max to declare Chloe the winner as Billy finally gets the Grinch part that Barb was trying not to tell him. Phoebe and Max then lift Chloe with their powers so that she can put the Christmas star on top of the Christmas tree. The Thunder Monitor goes off as Nora Thunderman calls her family as she uses her laser vision to light up the Christmas star. Words then appear stating "Happy Holidays from The Thundermans". Special guest stars: Chris Tallman as Hank, Rosa Blasi as Barb, Diego Velazquez as Billy Guest star: Addison Riecke as Nora

== Production ==
Following the success of The Thundermans Return, a spinoff series was announced on May 16, 2024. Production began in August 2024 in Vancouver, British Columbia. The first season was ordered for 26 episodes, according to the Writers Guild of America directory listing, and the final episode of the season received its credits on January 10, 2025. It premiered on January 11, 2025, as a sneak peek promotion but officially began airing on January 22, 2025.

== Reception ==
Fernanda Camargo of Common Sense Media gave the series a 2 out of 5 stars, stating that "watching The Thundermans: Undercover sometimes feels like seeing a show that tries to address previous criticisms, but ends up falling into the same traps," comparing this show to the original series.

=== Awards and nominations ===
Year	Award	Category	Nominee(s)	Result	Refs
2025	Kids' Choice Awards	Favorite Kids TV Show	The Thundermans: Undercover	Won	
2025	Kids' Choice Awards	Favorite Male TV Star (Kids)	Jack Griffo	Won	
2025	Kids' Choice Awards	Favorite Female TV Star (Kids)	Kira Kosarin	Won	
2025	Kids' Choice Awards	Favorite Female TV Star (Kids)	Maya Le Clark	Nominated	
2026	Kids' Choice Awards	Favorite Kids TV Show	The Thundermans: Undercover	Nominated	
2026	Kids' Choice Awards	Favorite Male TV Star (Kids)	Jack Griffo	Won	
2026	Kids' Choice Awards	Favorite Female TV Star (Kids)	Kira Kosarin	Won	
2026	Kids' Choice Awards	Favorite Female TV Star (Kids)	Maya Le Clark	Nominated	
