= The Thundermans Return =

2024 American television film

- Release poster
- Directed by: Trevor Kirschner
- Teleplay by: Jed Spingarn
- Story by: Jed Spingarn; Sean W. Cunningham; Marc Dworkin
- Based on: The Thundermans by Jed Spingarn
- Produced by: Jed Spingarn; Kira Kosarin; Jack Griffo; Dan Cross; David Hoge; Zack Olin; Shauna Phelan; Chris Phillips
- Starring: Kira Kosarin; Jack Griffo; Addison Riecke; Diego Velazquez; Maya Le Clark; Chris Tallman; Rosa Blasi
- Cinematography: John Simmons
- Edited by: Michael Karlich
- Music by: Caleb Chan; Brian Chan
- Production company: Nickelodeon Movies
- Distributed by: Nickelodeon; Paramount+
- Release date: March 7, 2024
- Running time: 70 minutes
- Country: United States
- Language: English

The Thundermans Return is a 2024 American superhero comedy film directed by Trevor Kirschner and written by Jed Spingarn from a story conceived by Spingarn and the writing team of Sean W. Cunningham and Marc Dworkin. It is a follow-up film to the Nickelodeon comedy series The Thundermans (2013–18), created by Spingarn. The film stars Kira Kosarin, Jack Griffo, Addison Riecke, Diego Velazquez, Maya Le Clark, Chris Tallman, and Rosa Blasi, reprising their roles as the Thunderman family. Dana Snyder also reprises his voice role as Dr. Colosso, alongside a returning ensemble cast that includes Daniele Gaither, Harvey Guillén, Helen Hong, Tanner Stine, Kenny Ridwan, Audrey Whitby, Jake Borelli, Jeff Meacham, Michael Foster, Jamieson Price, and Paul F. Tompkins. Despite being a feature film, it used a multiple-camera setup and laugh track like the show.

The Thundermans Return premiered on Nickelodeon on March 7, 2024, and was simultaneously available for streaming on Paramount+.

Following the success of the film, a spin-off and sequel series titled The Thundermans: Undercover was greenlit and premiered on January 11, 2025.

== Plot ==
Three years after the events of the series finale, when meteors strike Metroburg, the Thundermans step in to save the citizens. After the save, the family want to have a fun night, but it is interrupted when another crime breaks out. When another team called the "V-Team" also arrive, Max ends up accidentally dropping a giant doughnut onto one of their members. Due to a Hero League law where a superhero is forbidden from harming another superhero, the Thundermans are fired by Super President Kickbutt and are sent back to Hiddenville where they reunite with the Thunder Monitor and Dr. Colosso. While Hank and Barb enjoy their return, and Billy and Nora look forward to a normal high school life, Max and Phoebe are determined to regain their superhero status.

Meanwhile, Dark Mayhem, King Crab and Strongdor are in the Metroburg prison. The V-Team approaches them, revealing themselves to be their children: Dark Mayhem Jr., She-Crab, and Krondor. The children decide to devise their own plan, leaving their fathers imprisoned.

In a desperate to retrieve their jobs, the Thunder Twins come up with the idea of the "Tree Force" and pitch it to the family. However, the rest of the family prefer living a normal life.

Meanwhile at Hiddenville High, Nora utilizes her laser eyes to obtain friends. When Billy couldn't make a friend alone, he uses the same idea. Angered by this, Nora tries to zap Billy, whilst the latter tries to avoid the attacks: this results in Nora zapping off Principal Bradford's ponytail.

Back at home, Barb and Hank, still worried for Chloe's safety, call Cousin Blobbin requesting to borrow his helicopter to monitor Chloe without her noticing. Phoebe's BFF Cherry launches two Splat Shakes that Hank had ordered from Splat Burger up to the helicopter. With Hank failing to catch them, they end up spilling and interfering with the helicopter's circuits. They are forced to make an emergency landing, crashing in front of Chloe and her friends.

After that, Max and Phoebe figure out the V-Team are villains, they go by themselves to their lab to try to capture them, but Dark Mayhem Jr., She-Crab, and Krondor catch them and tie them up. After that, the Thunder Twins are sent to a mysterious place called "The Mayhem Cafe", in which they get tortured by Dark Mayhem's pre-recorded voice guide. After escaping from the box, they get locked in with an upcoming self-destruct.

Meanwhile, Dark Mayhem Jr., She-Crab, and Krondor are trying to locate the Power Plant, which they find in the Thundermans' house. At first, Hank, who is the only one to know where the Power Plant is, refuses to give it to them, but then Dark Mayhem Jr. shows him on his phone that Max and Phoebe are getting tortured, so Hank agrees to give the evil children the Power Plant if the Thunder Twins get released after. Dark Mayhem Jr. agree to this and Hank gives them the Power Plant believing the twins would be released, but he lied. Dark Mayhem Jr., She-Crab, and Krondor escape with the Power Plant and Max and Phoebe are still trapped in the mysterious place. And when all hopes are down in the Thundermans' house, Billy finds a blue part of the Power Plant that fell off the plant and can make superheroes. They end up feeding pieces of the blue part to Cherry, Oyster, Gideon, Principal Bradford, and Mrs. Wong, turning them into superheroes. After being turned into superheroes, they all work together to break the forcefield, and they succeed. Upon succeeding, Chloe teleports them to the location of Phoebe and Max. With Chloe's teleportation needing a recharge, right before the self-destruct, Hank punches the system, causing it to break and allowing them out.

Afterwards, the Thundermans confront the villains' children, who are on the top of Mount Metroburg planning to release the red pieces of the power plant inside of a drone, having their parents view said plan. Whilst the family defeat the Villains, Dark Mayhem Jr. releases the red pieces over Metroburg in a drone. Chloe volunteers to teleport someone onto to the drone to prevent them from affecting citizens. She teleports Max and Phoebe onto the drone and they remove the red pieces. With Phoebe being blinded by the wind, she gets blown onto the edge of the drone, about to fall. She tells the two to teleport back without her, but they refuse. Chloe reaches for her hand and they return to the rest of the family safely. The villains are detained as Strongdor and Krondor start to bond much to the annoyance of Dark Mayhem Jr.

Later, Super President Kickbutt reinstates the T-Force since the rule they broke doesn't apply to supervillains posing as superheroes. The Thundermans agree, but on the condition that their Hiddenville home be their new headquarters. Super President Kickbutt agrees and welcomes the T-Force back to the Hero League. When the empowered civilians later show up, Phoebe freezes them and plans to deal with them tomorrow.

Unbeknownst to everyone, Dr. Colosso receives a mysterious message from an unknown being, promising a special assignment for him. (Note: The unknown being is revealed to be Malware in the first episode of the sequel series The Thundermans: Undercover which this movie leads into.)

== Cast ==
- Kira Kosarin as Phoebe Thunderman
- Jack Griffo as Max Thunderman
- Addison Riecke as Nora Thunderman
- Diego Velazquez as Billy Thunderman
- Maya Le Clark as Chloe Thunderman
- Chris Tallman as Hank Thunderman
- Rosa Blasi as Barb Thunderman
- Harvey Guillén as Cousin Blobbin
- Helen Hong as Mrs. Wong
- Tanner Stine as Oyster
- Kenny Ridwan as Gideon
- James Hong as Grandpa Giddy
- Audrey Whitby as Cherry
- Jake Borelli as Wolfgang
- Daniele Gaither as Super President Kickbutt
- Jeff Meacham as Principal Bradford
- Paul F. Tompkins as King Crab
- Michael Foster as Strongdor
- Brandon Pappo as Dark Mayhem Jr.
- Brittany Bardwell as She-Crab
- Greg Rogstad as Krondor
- Jason Nash as Metroburg Police Officer (uncredited)

=== Voices ===
- Dana Snyder as Dr. Colosso
- Robin Atkin Downes as T-Force Assistant
- Margit Furseth as Female Computer
- Jennifer Hale as Thunder Monitor
- Jamieson Price as Dark Mayhem
- John Sanders as Announcer

== Production ==
On March 2, 2023, it was announced that a follow-up film to the Nickelodeon television series The Thundermans, titled The Thundermans Return was in development at Nickelodeon Productions, to serve as a potential backdoor pilot to a revival/sequel series. The entire cast of the original series had been set to reprise their roles in the feature film. Trevor Kirschner had been hired to direct, with series creator and showrunner Jed Spingarn writing the screenplay, and Zack Olin and Shauna Phelan producing.

=== Filming ===
Principal photography began on April 3, 2023, in Los Angeles.

== Release ==
On December 2, 2023, it was announced that The Thundermans Return would premiere on Nickelodeon and Paramount+ on March 7, 2024. The first teaser trailer was released the same month. The second trailer was released on February 11, 2024 during Super Bowl LVIII. An extended sneak peek was shown on February 21, 2024. The Thundermans Return was released on DVD on April 2, 2024.

== Reception ==
Polly Conway of Common Sense Media rated the film a two-out-of-five stars, stating that, "Fans who miss this wisecracking family may want to check it out, but it won't garner any new Thunderman devotees."

== Soundtrack ==
An official soundtrack was released on March 15, 2024 with score by Caleb Chan and Brian Chan. It was performed by F.A.M.E.'S project orchestra in Macedonia. The score was nominated for a Canadian Screen Music Awards in 2024.

== Sequel ==
On July 31, 2025, Deadline Hollywood announced that filming had begun on a new Thundermans movie titled Clash of the Thundermans. The film features the return of the primary cast members, as well as the addition of Ariel Winter as a new character named Cognita. It was also announced that Trevor Kirschner would return as director. The film was released on Paramount+ and Nickelodeon on September 3, 2026.
