= Chris Tallman =

American actor and comedian (born 1970)

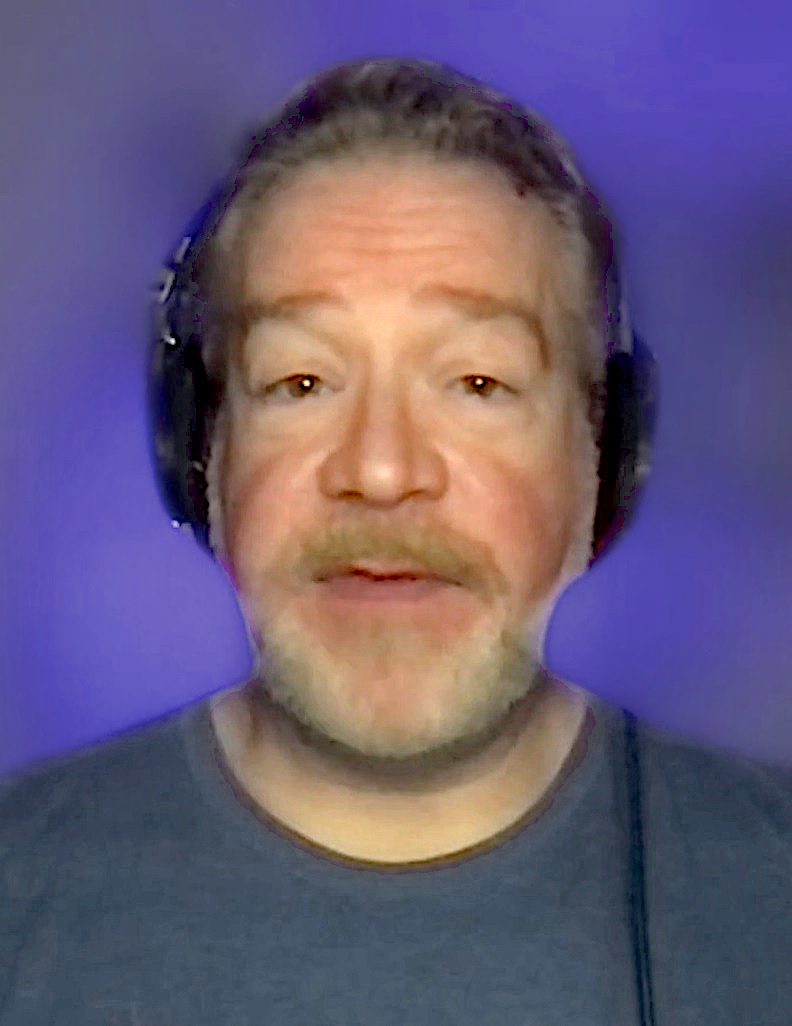
- Tallman in 2024
- Born: Christian Peter Tallman; September 22, 1970 (age 56); Madison, Wisconsin, U.S.
- Education: Madison West High School
- Alma mater: University of Wisconsin–Madison
- Occupations: Actor; comedian
- Years active: 1991–present
- Known for: Hank Thunderman in The Thundermans
- Spouse: Sarah Stanard (m. 2006)
- Children: 2

Christian Peter Tallman (born September 22, 1970) is an American actor and comedian. He is best known for his regular appearances on the Comedy Central programs Crossballs and Reno 911! and the Nickelodeon program The Thundermans.

== Early life ==
Tallman was born Christian Peter Tallman on September 22, 1970, in Madison, Wisconsin to Sally (née Probasco) and John B. Tallman (1940–2020). He attended Madison West High School and graduated in 1988. He performed with a number of theater groups in Madison, as well as being a long-standing member of the Madison chapter of ComedySportz and is currently on the roster of ComedySportz Los Angeles.

== Career ==
Tallman was also the creator of the popular Channel 101 series Time Belt which he wrote, directed, co-produced and starred in. He starred in the Nickelodeon superhero comedy The Thundermans as Hank Thunderman. He has also guest-starred on many television shows such as House, Parks and Recreation, Emily's Reasons Why Not, Angel, How I Met Your Mother, The Sarah Silverman Program, The King of Queens, and appeared on Frank TV as Ed McMahon. Currently he appears weekly on the Dungeons & Dragons tabletop role-playing game podcast, Nerd Poker.

In 2007, Tallman was part of the ensemble cast of NBC's improvised comedy show Thank God You're Here, which showcased the improvisational skills of a group of four celebrity guest stars each week, as they walk into a live sketch without having seen a script for it.

Tallman would later reprise his role of Hank Thunderman in The Thundermans Return and some episodes of The Thundermans: Undercover.

== Personal life ==
Tallman married his wife Sarah Stanard in 2006. Together they have two children.

He was awarded the Channel 101 Lifetime Achievement Award at the 2007 Channel 101 Channy Awards.

== Filmography ==
=== Film ===
Year	Title	Role	Notes
2006	Rescue Dawn	DJ	
2007	Reno 911!: Miami	Alligator Expert	
2008	Man Stroke Woman	Various Characters	
2010	Alabama	Skipper	

=== Television ===
Year	Title	Role	Notes
1991	Comic Cabana	The Bert Fershners	TV series
1998	Spin City	Bouncer	Episode: "The Marrying Men"
1999	Diagnosis: Murder	Andy Baxter	Episode: "The Roast"
1999	Angel	Nick	Episode: "The Bachelor Party"
1999	Frank Leaves for the Orient	Ed	Episodes: "The Girlfriend", "Ed"
2002	Robot Bastard!	Commander	Short
2003	Computerman	Lynn Stalmaster	Episode: "Computerman Auditions"
2003–2004	Time Belt	Dr. Daniel Bloom	8 episodes
2003–2009	Reno 911!	Gary the Klansman / Shelby's Dad / Porn Guy	9 episodes
2004	Quintuplets	Josh	Episode: "Where Are They Now?"
2005	Dick Richards: Private Dick	King Pack	TV series short, 2 episodes
2005	Gregory Shitcock, P.I.	Chris Tallman Shitcock	TV series short, 2 episodes
2005	The Wright Stuff	Birdman	TV series short
2006	Emily's Reasons Why Not	The carney worker	Episode: "Pilot"
2006	House	Vince	Episode: "No Reason"
2005–2006	The Wastelander	Bruce	TV series short, 5 episodes
2006	Jimmy Kimmel Live!	Park Ranger	Episode 4.316
2006	Woria: Queen of Power	Father	TV short
2007	The King of Queens	Bill (uncredited)	Episode: "Mild Bunch"
2007	Halfway Home	Victor Galaxy	Episode: "Halfway Working"
2007	Thank God You're Here	Himself	7 episodes
2007	Cautionary Tales of Swords	Anchorman	TV series short
2007	American Body Shop	Dr. Gunterman	Episode: "Stretchy Face"
2007	Back to You	Officer Pete Thurston	Episode: "Fish Story"
2007	The Sarah Silverman Program	Officer Thwidge / Weatherman	3 episodes
2007	Frank TV	Ed McMahon	Episode: "Frankincense and Myrrh"
2008	How I Met Your Mother	Mark	Episode: "The Bracket"
2008	Chocolate News	Alan Boda	
2009	ER	Burt Mulligan	Episode: "T-Minus-8"
2009	The Mentalist	Carl Resnick	Episode: "Russet Potatoes"
2009	Parks and Recreation	Wendell Adams	Episode: "Kaboom"
2009–2014	Channy Awards	Lynn Stallmaster / Dr. Disaster	5 episodes
2010	Miami Medical	Sam Seaver	Episode: "Like A Hurricane"
2011	Bones	Connor Trammel	Episode: "The Male in the Mail"
2011	The League	Mr. Swall	Episode: "The Guest Bong"
2013	Community	Bellman	Episode: "Conventions of Space and Time"
2013	Rizzoli & Isles	David Sutton	Episode: "All for One"
2013, 2016	Comedy Bang! Bang!	Chef René / Judge	2 episodes
2013–2018	The Thundermans	Hank Thunderman	Main role
2014	The Haunted Hathaways	Hank Thunderman	Episode: "Haunted Thundermans: Part 2"
2015	Nickelodeon's Ho Ho Holiday Special	Carl	TV special
2017	Nickelodeon's Not So Valentine's Special	Carl	TV special
2017	Nickelodeon's Sizzling Summer Camp Special	Carl	TV special
2016	Bajillion Dollar Propertie$	Hector	Episode: "Brtox"
2018	Go! Cartoons	Pottyhorse / Hair Metal Buffalo / Sammin' Salmon (voice)	Episode: "Pottyhorse"
2018	Hotel Du Loone	Kenneth Lowe	8 episodes
2019	Knight Squad	The Wiper	Episode: "A Knight to Remember", also a writer in 3 episodes
2019	Hot Streets	Brett Bryce / Farmer / Worker	Episode: "Blood Barn"
2024	The Thundermans Return	Hank Thunderman	Television film
2025	The Thundermans: Undercover	Hank Thunderman	5 episodes; also wrote "Prank You, Next"
2026	Clash of the Thundermans	Hank Thunderman	Television film
