= Rosa Blasi =

American actress

- Born: December 19, 1972 (age 53); Chicago, Illinois, U.S.
- Occupations: Actress, model, author, singer, psychologist
- Years active: 1996–present
- Known for: Strong Medicine; The Thundermans
- Spouses: Jim Finn (m. 2004; div. 2008) Todd William Harris (m. 2014)
- Children: 2 (Note: She has one biological child and one step child.)

Rosa Blasi Harris (born December 19, 1972) is an American actress, author, model, singer and therapist. She is known for her roles as Luisa Delgado in the Lifetime medical drama series Strong Medicine and Barb Thunderman in the Nickelodeon series The Thundermans.

== Early life ==
Blasi's parents are Italian immigrant Rocco, who was a professor at Harper College in Palatine, Illinois, and Irish-Puerto Rican Joyce Blasi. She grew up in Mount Prospect, Illinois. Blasi is a classically trained mezzo soprano. She also comes from a strong theatre background; ranging from the Piven Performance Company, as well as The Second City, to starring in numerous musicals and touring with Kenny Rogers. Blasi has two sisters, Marina and Tasha, and two brothers, Michael and Rocky.

== Career ==
Blasi's television debut was a recurring role in the CBS soap opera The Bold and the Beautiful. Soon to follow was a starring role in the MTV/UPN sitcom Hitz. She soon found herself guest starring in numerous shows such as Frasier, Becker, Caroline in the City, V.I.P., Grown Ups, and Beverly Hills, 90210. She later starred in the dramatic Showtime film Noriega: God's Favorite. The film was directed by Roger Spottiswoode and co-starred Bob Hoskins.

In her breakout role, Blasi starred in the Lifetime drama series Strong Medicine from 2000 to 2006 as a doctor in a medical drama with a focus on feminist politics, health issues, and class conflict. She made an appearance in "Shootout", a 2005 episode of CSI: Miami. Audiences saw Blasi in her first role in a major film as the wife of Bill Pullman's character in The Grudge.

Blasi appeared during The Vagina Monologues at the Apollo Theater and has also been a recurring performer at the "What a Pair" benefit concert for breast cancer research and has recorded numerous radio and television voice-overs. She was a repeat guest on talk shows such as Politically Incorrect with Bill Maher (where she admitted, in an appearance alongside Rev. Jerry Falwell, "No, my boobs aren't real—they're real paid for, though! No debt collectors trying to repo my boobs!") and The Late Late Show with Craig Kilborn. She played Ronnie Cruz in Make It or Break It. She also played Barb Thunderman in Nickelodeon's The Thundermans, as well as a recurring character in General Hospital. She wrote a comedic memoir titled Jock Itch: Misadventures of a Retired Jersey Chaser (2011) published by HarperCollins.

== Personal life ==
Blasi married athlete Jim Finn on February 14, 2004 in Maui, Hawaii. Blasi gave birth to their daughter on September 20, 2006. The couple divorced in 2008.

On May 3, 2014, Blasi married Todd William Harris, a mortgage broker. They married 16 months after they first connected on Match.com. She has stepdaughter Ryan from Harris's previous relationship.

In 2019, Blasi earned her master's degree in clinical psychology from Antioch University Los Angeles and is a licensed marriage and family therapist with a specialization in addiction and recovery.

On December 24, 2020, her father Rocco died of COVID-19. He was 87 years old.

== Filmography ==
=== Film ===
Year	Title	Role	Notes
2000	Noriega: God's Favorite	Vicky Amador	
2002	Making Changes	Deanna	
2004	The Grudge	Maria	
2004	Lesser Of Three Evils	Woman in Black	
2008	Memories of Murder	N/A	
2020	Sinister Stalker	Izzie	

=== Television series ===
Year	Title	Role	Notes
1996	The Bold and the Beautiful	Shelly	5 episodes
1996	High Tide	N/A	Episodes: "University Blues: Parts 1 & 2"
1997	Married... with Children	Woman #1	Episode: "Breaking Up Is Easy To Do: Part 2"
1997	Hitz	April Beane	Main role
1998	Frasier	The waitress	Episode: "Secret Admirer"
1998	Becker	Carmen	Episode: "Sex In The Inner City"
1998	Caroline in the City	Lana	Episode: "Caroline And The Booby Trap"
1999	Holding the Baby	Wendy	Episode: "Make Room For Da-Da" (unaired)
1999	Sons of Thunder	Marita Cortez	Episode: "Moment Of Truth"
1999	Beverly Hills, 90210	Clara Covington	Episode: "Withdrawal"
1999	Grown Ups	Carla	Episode: "The Out Of Work-Out"
1999	The Drew Carey Show	Isabel	Episode: "Drew Cam"
2000	V.I.P.	Cassandra	Episode: "New Val'd Order"
2000–2006	Strong Medicine	Dr. Luisa "Lu" Delgado	Main role
2005	CSI: Miami	Ana Garcia	Episode: "Shootout"
2006	Inseparable	Lois	Unsold television pilot
2007	Eight Days a Week	Randi Rome	Unaired pilot; main role
2009–2012	Make It or Break It	Ronnie Cruz	Recurring role
2009	Melrose Place	Nicolette Sarling	Pilot episode
2010	General Hospital	Fernanda DeLarosa	1 episode
2010	Next Stop Murder	Heather	TV movie
2010	Lone Star	Blake Thatcher	Recurring role
2011	Mr. Sunshine	Jessica	Episode: "Heather's Sister"
2012	Hot in Cleveland	Jessica	Episode: "What's Behind the Door"
2012	Teenage Bank Heist	FBI Agent Christine Mendoza	Television movie
2013	Second Shot	Julia Rivas	Episode: "You Can't Go Home Again. So Why Am I Here?"
2013–2018	The Thundermans	Barb Thunderman/Electress	Main role
2014	The Haunted Hathaways	Barb Thunderman/Electress	Crossover episode: "The Haunted Thundermans"
2017	Christmas Princess	Sara	TV movie
2017	Battle of the Network Stars	Herself/Competitor	TV Sex Symbols team
2018	Modern Family	Florence	Episode: "Did the Chicken Cross the Road?"
2019–2020	Team Kaylie	Kit Konrad	Recurring role
2020	Coop & Cami Ask the World	Mrs. Darricks	Episode: "Would You Rather Be the Wagners?"
2024	The Thundermans Return	Barb Thunderman/Electress	Television film
2025	The Thundermans: Undercover	Barb Thunderman/Electress	5 episodes
2026	Clash of the Thundermans	Barb Thunderman/Electress	Television film
