= Kira Kosarin =

American actress and singer (born 1997)

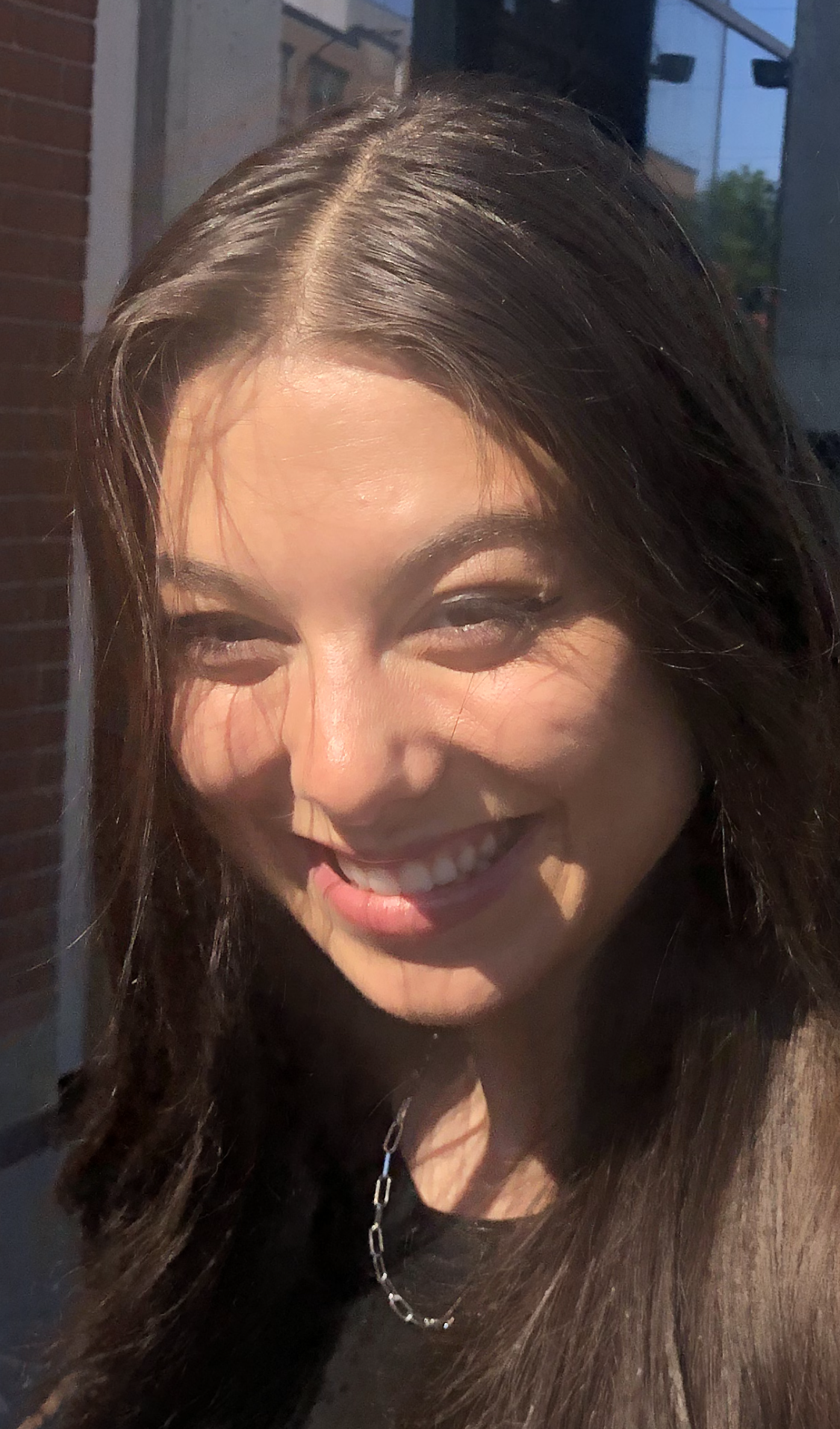
- Kosarin in 2022
- Born: Kira Nicole Kosarin; October 7, 1997 (age 29); New Jersey, U.S.
- Occupations: Actress; singer; director
- Years active: 2012–present
- Spouse: Max Chester (m. 2024)
- Musical career
- Genres: Pop; R&B
- Instruments: Vocals; guitar
- Label: Republic

Kira Nicole Kosarin (born October 7, 1997) is an American actress, singer, and television director, known for her role as Phoebe Thunderman on the Nickelodeon series The Thundermans. On April 10, 2019, she independently released her debut album, Off Brand, later signing with Republic Records in 2022.

== Early life ==
Kosarin's family is of Ashkenazi Jewish descent, with ancestors from Eastern Europe. Kosarin did dance and gymnastics in her early years. She studied ballet at Boca Ballet Theatre and attended middle school at Pine Crest School. Her parents were Broadway performers, her mother as an actress and her father as a music director, conductor and record producer, so she grew up acting, singing and dancing. After attending an "acting on camera" workshop, she decided to move to Los Angeles, California, in 2011 to pursue a career in acting. Kosarin, like many child performers, attended Brighton Hall School in Burbank, California.

== Career ==
=== Acting ===
Kosarin made her television debut in an episode of the Disney Channel sitcom Shake It Up.

In 2013, she began portraying Phoebe Thunderman in the Nickelodeon comedy The Thundermans. In 2015, Kosarin was nominated for a Kids' Choice Award in the Favorite TV Actress category, but the award went to Laura Marano. She was again nominated for the 2016 Kids' Choice Award for Favorite Female TV Star and again did not win, though she and her castmates won the award for Favorite TV Show for The Thundermans.

Her Nickelodeon television film, One Crazy Cruise (originally titled Tripwrecked), was filmed in fall 2014 in Vancouver, British Columbia, and premiered on June 19, 2015.

In April 2019, it was announced that Kosarin would appear in the second season of the Hulu horror series Light as a Feather, in which she portrayed the role of Nadia. In March 2023, Nickelodeon announced production of a Thundermans movie, with the original cast returning, entitled The Thundermans Return; Kosarin will also serve as executive producer of the film. In May 2024, after the success of the film, a sequel series titled The Thundermans: Undercover was announced, with Kosarin reprising her role and acting as executive producer. She won her first Kids' Choice Award in 2025 for Favorite Female TV Star (Kids) from the series.

=== Music ===
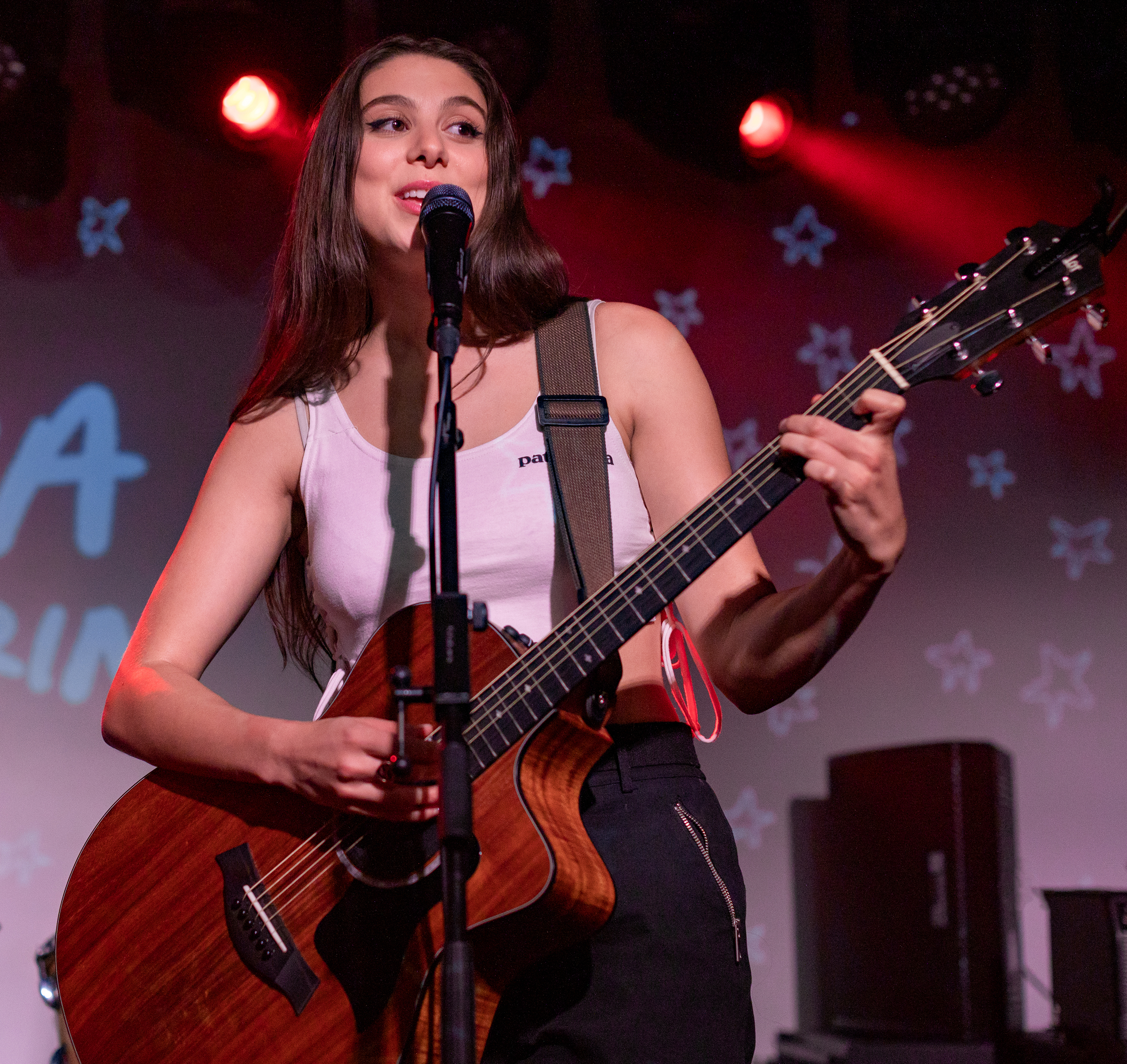
Kosarin performing in 2022

On February 24, 2018, Kosarin announced her debut single, "Spy", which was released on March 16, 2018. On January 11, 2019, Kosarin released her next single, "Vinyl", which was accompanied by a music video. This was followed by three subsequent singles, "Love Me Like You Hate Me", "47 Hours" and "Take This Outside".

Her debut album, Off Brand, was released on April 10, 2019. In July 2019, Kosarin was set to embark on a headline tour across the United Kingdom to promote the release of Off Brand, but this was later cancelled due to "scheduling conflicts". On November 8, 2019, Kosarin released her next single, "Simple", a collaboration with American DJ Carneyval. Kosarin also has a YouTube channel where she posts music covers and songs. On July 15, 2020, she independently released an extended play, Songbird. In March 2022, it was announced that Kosarin had been signed to Republic Records. She released her debut major-label single, "Mood Ring", on March 11, 2022.

== Personal life ==
As of 2020, Kosarin has been in a relationship with musician Max Chester. She announced that they married on July 17, 2024 through her Instagram account.

== Filmography ==
Film
| Year | Title | Role | Notes | Ref. |
|---|---|---|---|---|
| 2015 | One Crazy Cruise | Ellie Bauer | Television film | |
| 2019 | Lucky | Shannon | Voice | |
| 2021 | Supercool | Ava | | |
| 2024 | The Thundermans Return | Phoebe Thunderman | Also executive producer | |
| 2026 | Clash of the Thundermans | Phoebe Thunderman | Also executive producer | |

Television
| Year | Title | Role | Notes | Ref. |
|---|---|---|---|---|
| 2012 | Shake It Up | Raina Kumar | Episode: "Wrestle It Up" | |
| 2013–2018 | The Thundermans | Phoebe Thunderman | Main role | |
| 2014 | AwesomenessTV | Herself | Guest host; episode: "Teen Challenge" | |
| 2014 | The Haunted Hathaways | Phoebe Thunderman | Episode: "The Haunted Thundermans" | |
| 2016 | School of Rock | Princess Oliviana | Episode: "A Band with No Name" | |
| 2016 | Henry Danger | Phoebe Thunderman | Episode: "Danger & Thunder" | |
| 2016 | Hell's Kitchen | Herself | Uncredited guest diner; Episode: "Let The Catfights Begin" | |
| 2016–2017 | Paradise Run | Herself | 3 episodes | |
| 2018 | Lip Sync Battle Shorties | Herself | Episode: "Catwalk/Jungle/Girls Night Out" | |
| 2018 | Knight Squad | Kiki | Episode: "Wish I May, Wish I Knight" | |
| 2018 | Double Dare | Herself | Contestant; episode: "Thunderstruck vs. Girl Power" | |
| 2018 | All About the Washingtons | Malia | Episode: "Yo! Bum Rush The Secret Show" | |
| 2019 | Good Trouble | Aria | Episode: "Parental Guidance Suggested" | |
| 2019 | Welcome to the Wayne | Stacey Wasserman | Voice; episode: "Welcome to the Wassermans" | |
| 2019 | Light as a Feather | Nadia | Recurring role; Season 2 | |
| 2023 | The Tiny Chef Show | Herself | Episode: "Tiny Chef's Marvelous Mish Mesh Special" | |
| 2024 | That '90s Show | Betsy Kelso | 3 episodes | |
| 2025–present | The Thundermans: Undercover | Phoebe Thunderman | Main role; also executive producer, and director (episode "Prank You, Next") | |
| 2026 | Hollywood Arts | Sasha | Episode: "He Sang She Sang"; also director: "Cattle Call" and "A Faire to Remember" | |

=== Television Special ===
| Year | Title |
|---|---|
| 2015 | Kids' Choice Awards |
| 2015 | Nickelodeon's Ho Ho Holiday Special |
| 2016 | Kids' Choice Awards |
| 2017 | Nickelodeon's Not So Valentine's Television special |
| 2017 | Kids' Choice Awards |
| 2017 | Nickelodeon's Sizzling Summer Camp Television special |
| 2018 | Kids' Choice Awards |
| 2023 | Kids' Choice Awards |
| 2024 | Kids' Choice Awards |
| 2025 | Kids' Choice Awards |

== Discography ==
- Off Brand (2019)
- Songbird (EP) (2020)
- Something New (EP) (2022)

== Awards and nominations ==
| Award | Year | Category | Work | Result | Refs |
|---|---|---|---|---|---|
| Nickelodeon Kids' Choice Awards | 2015 | Favorite TV Actress | The Thundermans | Nominated | |
| Nickelodeon Kids' Choice Awards | 2016 | Favorite TV Actress – Kids Show | The Thundermans | Nominated | |
| Nickelodeon Kids' Choice Awards | 2017 | Favorite TV Actress | The Thundermans | Nominated | |
| Nickelodeon Kids' Choice Awards | 2018 | Favorite TV Actress | The Thundermans | Nominated | |
| Nickelodeon Kids' Choice Awards | 2025 | Favorite Female TV Star (Kids) | The Thundermans: Undercover | Won | |
