= The Thundermans =

2013 comedy television series

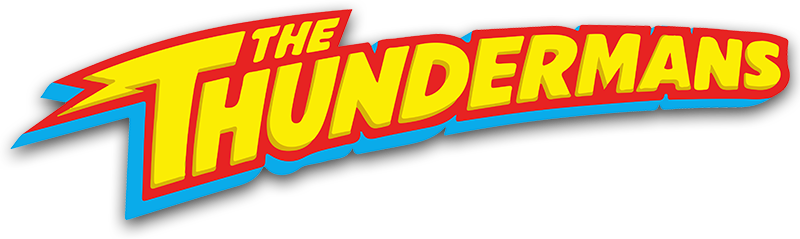
- Genre: Comedy
- Created by: Jed Spingarn
- Starring: Kira Kosarin; Jack Griffo; Addison Riecke; Diego Velazquez; Chris Tallman; Rosa Blasi; Maya Le Clark
- Composer: Ron Wasserman
- Country of origin: United States
- Original language: English
- No. of seasons: 4
- No. of episodes: 98 (list of episodes)

Production
- Executive producers: Jed Spingarn; Dan Cross & David Hoge; Sean W. Cunningham & Marc Dworkin
- Producer: Patty Gary-Cox
- Camera setup: Multi-camera
- Running time: 22–23 minutes
- Production companies: Cross Hoge Productions; Nickelodeon Productions; Dworkingham Productions

Original release
- Network: Nickelodeon
- Release: October 14, 2013 – May 25, 2018

Related
- The Thundermans Return (2024); The Thundermans: Undercover

The Thundermans is an American comedy television series created by Jed Spingarn that aired on Nickelodeon from October 14, 2013 to May 25, 2018. The series stars Kira Kosarin, Jack Griffo, Addison Riecke, Diego Velazquez, Chris Tallman, Rosa Blasi, and Maya Le Clark, and features the voice of Dana Snyder as Dr. Colosso. In March 2023, a follow-up film titled The Thundermans Return was announced, which was released on March 7, 2024.

== Plot ==
The series revolves around the Thundermans, a family with superpowers who try to live normal lives in the fictional city of Hiddenville. Phoebe dreams of being a superhero and using her powers for good, while her twin brother Max wants to be the next big supervillain and use his powers for evil. Parents Hank and Barb attempt to live normal lives and not use their superpowers – albeit not very successfully – while Nora and Billy enjoy using theirs whenever possible. A former supervillain named Dr. Colosso has been transmogrified into a rabbit and lives in Max's lair in the basement, offering him advice on becoming a villain.

At the end of the second season, Chloe is introduced as the baby sister.

During the third season, Phoebe starts training to become a superhero, while the master super villain, Dark Mayhem, trains Max to become a villain. At the end of the season, Dark Mayhem asks Max to prove he is a villain by taking away Phoebe's powers. However, Max chooses his family and becomes a superhero instead by helping them take down Dark Mayhem.

During the fourth season, Max and Phoebe, under their Thunder Twins team-up, are selected as candidates for membership to the elite Hero League team called the Z-Force. Halfway through the season, Phoebe accidentally absorbs Dark Mayhem's powers, which turn her evil, but her family saves her. At the end, Phoebe and Max become the new Z-Force leaders and enroll the Thundermans as members.

== Episodes ==
Season	Episodes	Originally released	
Season	Episodes	First released	Last released
1	20	October 14, 2013	June 14, 2014
2	24	September 13, 2014	March 28, 2015
3	25	June 27, 2015	October 10, 2016
4	29	October 22, 2016	May 25, 2018

== Cast ==
- Kira Kosarin as Phoebe Thunderman
- Jack Griffo as Max Thunderman
- Addison Riecke as Nora Thunderman
- Diego Velazquez as Billy Thunderman
- Chris Tallman as Hank Thunderman
- Rosa Blasi as Barb Thunderman
- Maya Le Clark as Chloe Thunderman (recurring, season 3; main, season 4)

== Production ==
On August 3, 2012, Nickelodeon announced The Thundermans as one of its upcoming live-action series. Shooting began in mid-February and extras were cast at that time and throughout the production at Paramount Studios in Los Angeles. Its pilot was shot in October 2012. On December 20, 2013, the series was renewed for a second season. The second season premiered on September 13, 2014. On March 4, 2015, the series was renewed for a third season. The third season premiered on June 27, 2015. On March 2, 2016, the series was renewed for a fourth season, which premiered on October 22, 2016. Nickelodeon ordered six additional episodes for the series' fourth season on May 16, 2017, which would take the series over 100 total episodes. On July 27, 2017, Nickelodeon released a statement to J-14, stating that the series had wrapped after four seasons and 103 produced episodes.

== Reception ==
=== Ratings ===
Viewership and ratings per season of The Thundermans
Season	Episodes	First aired		Last aired		Avg. viewers (millions)
Season	Episodes	Date	Viewers (millions)	Date	Viewers (millions)	Avg. viewers (millions)
1	20	October 14, 2013	2.39	June 14, 2014	2.16	2.05
2	24	September 13, 2014	1.56	March 28, 2015	2.18	1.82
3	25	June 27, 2015	2.42	October 10, 2016	2.43	1.61
4	29	October 22, 2016	1.96	May 25, 2018	1.39 (Note: Due to the duration of this episode, it leaked into Nick at Nite, which split the ratings since Nielsen considers it a separate network despite being on the same channel. The viewership data is a combined average of the ratings from both "networks", with 1.36 million total viewers for the Nickelodeon portion and 1.41 million total viewers for the Nick at Nite portion.)	1.47

=== Awards and nominations ===
Year	Award	Category	Result	Ref.
2016	Nickelodeon Kids' Choice Awards	Favorite TV Show	Won	
2016	British Academy Children's Awards	BAFTA Kids' Vote – Television	Nominated	
2016	Kids' Choice Awards Argentina	Favorite International Program	Nominated	
2017	Nickelodeon Kids' Choice Awards	Favorite TV Show – Kids' Show	Nominated	
2017	Kids' Choice Awards Mexico	Favorite International Program	Nominated	
2017	Kids' Choice Awards Colombia	Favorite International Program	Nominated	
2017	Kids' Choice Awards Argentina	Favorite International Program	Nominated	

== Film ==
On March 2, 2023, it was announced that Nickelodeon greenlit a film titled The Thundermans Return, starring returning cast members Kira Kosarin, Jack Griffo, Addison Riecke, Diego Velazquez, Maya Le Clark, Chris Tallman, and Rosa Blasi. Filming began in Los Angeles in April 2023. On June 21, 2023, it was announced that the film would be released on Paramount+ in 2024. On December 2, 2023, it was announced that the film would premiere on both Nickelodeon and Paramount+ in March 2024, later specified as March 7.

== Spin-off series ==
On May 16, 2024, it was announced that a spinoff series had been ordered, with Kosarin, Griffo, and Le Clark reprising their roles. On December 19, 2024, it was announced that the spinoff, titled The Thundermans: Undercover, would premiere on January 22, 2025.
