= Populationism =

Populationism is a contemporary political or economic theory that builds on Malthusian theories of population control. According to this theory, the social, economic, and ecological problems of today can be attributed to the sheer volume of the human population. Populationists, the group of people that believe and support this theory, tend to make the distinction between themselves and neo-Malthusians due to some of the beliefs that drove Malthus's original theories. For example, "Malthus denied that there are limits to economic growth, didn’t believe that any measure could help the poor, and strongly opposed birth control." Many modern populationists strongly oppose coercive population control and believe in solutions that provide opportunities and access rather than limit them. Ultimately, populationism believes in the theory of Malthusianism, that the human population threatens the sustainability of our planet, but it believes in solutions centered around human rights.

== History ==
Populationism as a term was popularized sometime between the 16th and 17th centuries by Italian political thinker Giovanni Botero, though modern usage has shifted it away from his original theories. While Botero is typically attributed as the first proponent of this idea, before Botero, there was also Niccolò Machiavelli, a Florentine statesman and philosopher whose early stances on populationism were criticized by Botero, and Jean Bodin, a French jurist and political philosopher as well as Botero's contemporary and opponent. Botero's populationism understood that population and its size was directly tied to political, economic, and military advantage, and the ways in which this thought could lead to new plays and techniques of power. Botero used populationism to describe the idea of maximizing the number of people within a community to foster political greatness. Most of Botero's views on populationism can be traced back to his most famous work, The Reason of State. While the subject of this book was mainly an attack on the titular reason of state, the claimed right of rulers to act against natural and positive law in favor of expanding and preserving the state, Botero does posit his belief that the greatness of a city can be defined by the size of its population. Within the realm of biopolitics, he was one of the first people to adduce that the supreme happiness of man comes from easy and affordable access to food: "...justice secures each person’s possessions, peace causes agriculture, commerce and crafts to flourish, and plentiful food makes subsistence and life easier, for nothing makes the people happier than cheap bread."
