= AwesomenessTV (TV series) =

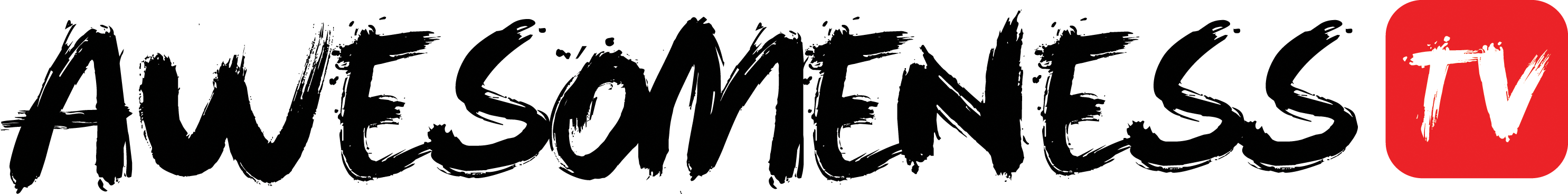
- Genre: Sketch comedy reality
- Created by: Brian Robbins
- Presented by: Daniella Monet
- Starring: Noland Ammon; Teala Dunn; Lauren Elizabeth; Isaiah Fredericks; Jo Jo Fredericks; Lia Marie Johnson; Lainey Lipson; Austin Mahone; Jenn McAllister; Kamil McFadden; Audrey Whitby
- Opening theme: "Get Set Go" by Seaside
- Country of origin: United States
- Original language: English
- No. of seasons: 2
- No. of episodes: 40

Production
- Executive producers: Shauna Phelan; Brian Robbins; Joe Davola
- Running time: 30 minutes
- Production companies: AwesomenessTV; Nickelodeon Productions

Original release
- Network: Nickelodeon
- Release: July 1, 2013 – March 7, 2015

AwesomenessTV is an American sketch comedy reality television series based on the YouTube channel of the same name and is created by Brian Robbins. Both seasons contain 20 episodes.

On May 1, 2014, Nickelodeon announced that the series had been renewed for a second season which premiered on May 5, 2014. It was not renewed for a third season due to the end of DreamWorks Animation's television deal with Nickelodeon through Viacom, who later bought AwesomenessTV in 2018.

== Plot ==
In the first season, the series was hosted by Daniella Monet as she presented sketches, music videos, and hidden camera antics. Young celebrities guest co-hosted episodes in the second season.

== Recurring sketches ==
- As the Locker Turns – A soap opera parody detailing various occurrences at a school.
- Bad Lifeguard on Duty – Cody (portrayed by Teala Dunn) and Harper (played by Lauren Elizabeth) are two lifeguards who don't take their job seriously.
- Bad Troop Leader – A troop leader (portrayed by Taryn Southern) does a terrible job when leading her scout troop.
- Best Excuses – Teala Dunn portrays different girls who show viewers different excuses for everything.
- Cave Girl's Guide To Beauty – A prehistoric teenage cavewoman (portrayed by Lainey Lipson) hosts a vlog where she shows people her prehistoric beauty tips as the self-proclaimed "prehistoric beauty guru."
- Gillian's Island – Gillian (portrayed by Amber Montana) is a girl who is a castaway on an island after her little brother farted and she fell off her parents' boat. With the help of her coconut friend Becky, who is also the producer of her show, Gillian shows people different things to do on the island while awaiting to be rescued.
- Gnarly Mann – Gnarly Mann (portrayed by Noland Ammon) is a radical and bodacious surfer-speaking boy who helps people with their romance problems.
- Hi-Tech History – Professor Hopkins Bittridge (portrayed by Kian Lawley) narrates about historic events while mentioning what would happen if there was advanced technology in the past.
- JennXPenn's 10 Ten – JennXPenn (the user name of Jenn McAllister) gives the views the top 10 guide for various topics.
- Kid History – A young narrator (portrayed by Zac Pullman) tells people about historic events in kid history like the first pillow fight and the first homework excuse.
- MadMoni – Different videos involving Madeline Whitby and Monica Sherer doing things like music video parodies.
- Mega Taco – Timbo (portrayed by Kamil McFadden) and Lala (played by Lia Marie Johnson) work at the Mega Taco food truck and try to make the orders there "mega."
- Molly is Totally Judging You – Molly Sanders (portrayed by Teala Dunn) is a teenage judge who presides over the campus dramas at Franklin High School where she is assisted by her teenage bailiff Bailey (portrayed by Lainey Lipson). Molly would go over different teenage cases where a teenager would sue another teenager for bad things that they did to them.
- Pet Therapist – A pet therapist (portrayed by Lia Marie Johnson) goes over therapy sessions with a pet and their owner where the therapist would often speak the mind of the owner's pet.
- Sarah's Slumber Party – Sarah (portrayed by Lauren Elizabeth) hosts a slumber party with her best friend Elizabeth (portrayed by Meghan Rienks). Their third member is Chloe (portrayed by Arden Rose) who Sarah reluctantly invites due to her mom being friends with Chloe's mom.
- Sierra's Guide to Acting Glamorously – Sierra (portrayed by Paulina Cerrilla) shows people how to act glamorously with the help of her butler Edmund (portrayed by Corey Johnson).
- Signs You're Addicted to... – Teala Dunn plays a different character who is addicted to a variety of social network services like Instagram, Twitter, Facebook, and others.
- Super Fan Brit Stickley – Brit Stickley (portrayed by Tiffany Espensen) is a super fan who would infiltrate different places where different celebrities are at and collects different things from them to put in her scrapbook. She is often accompanied by her offscreen little brother Petey as her cameraman where Brit would often argue with him.
- Super Science with Melvin – A self-proclaimed super scientist named Melvin (portrayed by Noland Ammon) tries to make new inventions which backfires on him.
- Swag Master J – Swag Master J (portrayed by Kamil McFadden) is a nerd who can "swaggify" anything.
- Terry the Tomboy – A tomboy named Terry (portrayed by Lia Marie Johnson) teaches the viewers of her vlog her guide to various stuff. She sometimes drags her friend Duncanty (portrayed by Noland Ammon) into her different vlogs. This sketch has a TV film of the same name.
- The Breakup Queen – A girl (portrayed by Sydney Park) breaks up with various people.
- The Love Doctor – Lindsay (portrayed by Lia Marie Johnson) runs an online show under the alias of "The Love Doctor" where she gives love advice to people who write to her.
- The Totally Completely Absolutely Unhelpful Verbose Customer Service Girl – Mia Anders (portrayed by Audrey Whitby) is a talkative customer service Girl who won't stop derailing the conversation whenever someone calls her up for customer service.
- The Worst DIY'er – Cybil (portrayed by Audrey Whitby) teaches people how to handle do-it-yourself projects which doesn't go well for her.
- Us and Jan – A series of music videos where Audrey (portrayed by Audrey Whitby) would do some activity and would be annoyed by her friend Jan (played by Allisyn Ashley Arm) who would try to get involved in the activity with disastrous results.
- Violet's Vampire Vlog – A vampire named Violet (portrayed by Catherine Valdes) does a vlog that details what vampires should be like when encountering people at night.
- World's Worst Babysitter – A laid back babysitter named Lia (portrayed by Lia Marie Johnson) shows viewers what not to do when babysitting as she demonstrates on her client Sammie (portrayed by her younger sister Sammie Johnson).
- Worst Teacher Ever – A teacher (portrayed by Brittani Louise Taylor) tells inaccurate information to her class.
- Yo My Boyfriend Ugly – Angelica Fratelli (portrayed by Teala Dunn) does makeovers to various characters to make them look good.
- Zay Zay and Jojo Sketches – Various sketches depict Zay Zay and Jo Jo in different activities.
  - Like a Boss – Zay Zay and Jo Jo show viewers how to do different things like a boss.
  - Random Thoughts by Jo Jo – Jo Jo tells people his random thoughts.
  - The Most Interesting Kid in the World – A parody of The Most Interesting Man in the World where Zay Zay has interesting talents like teaching his teachers, ghosts believing in him, making bullies pee their pants, and not being found during a game of hide and seek.
  - Would You Rather – Zay Zay and Jo Jo ask each other "Would You Rather" questions.

== Cast ==
- Daniella Monet as Host (season 1 and part of 2)
- Noland Ammon as Various
- Allisyn Ashley Arm as Various
- Joey Bragg as Various
- Paulina Cerrilla as Various
- Ricky Dillon as Various
- Teala Dunn as Various
- Gracie Dzienny as Various
- Lauren Elizabeth as Various
- Luke Eilers as Various
- Tiffany Espensen as Various
- Sophie Everhart as Various
- Connor Franta as Various
- Isaiah "Zay Zay" Fredericks as himself
- Jo Jo Fredericks as himself
- John Gasienica as Various
- Damien Haas as Various
- Corey Johnson as Various
- Lia Marie Johnson as Various
- Sammie Johnson as Various
- Kian Lawley as Various
- Fred Ligaard as Various
- Lainey Lipson as Various
- Austin Mahone as Various
- Jenn McAllister as Various
- Kamil McFadden as Various
- Amber Montana as Various
- Trevi Moran as Various
- Sydney Park as Various
- Zac Pullman as Various
- Meghan Rienks as Various
- Arden Rose as Various
- Monica Sherer - Various
- Bridget Shergalis as Various
- Taryn Southern as Various
- Brittani Louise Taylor as Various
- Shayne Topp as Various
- Catherine Valdes as Various
- Audrey Whitby as Various
- Madeline Whitby - Various
- Jenna Willis as Various
- Phil Galaras as Himself

== Production ==
The show is based on the YouTube channel and multi-channel network of the same name, featuring original content and existing content already on the channel. On August 27, 2013, Nickelodeon picked up 7 more episodes to add to Season 1, bringing the freshman season up to 20 episodes.

== Episodes ==
=== Series overview ===
Season	Episodes	Air date	
Season	Episodes	Season premiere	Season finale
1	20	July 1, 2013	December 16, 2013
2	20	May 5, 2014	March 7, 2015

=== Season 1 (2013) ===
- Daniella Monet hosts this entire season.

No. overall	No. in season	Title	Directed by	Written by	Original release date	Prod. code	US viewers (millions)
1	1	"Terry the Tomboy: Summer Style Guide"	Unknown	Unknown	July 1, 2013	101	N/A
2	2	"Walking Fred"	Unknown	Unknown	July 8, 2013	103	N/A
3	3	"Swag Master J: Swagify for School"	Unknown	Unknown	July 15, 2013	102	N/A
4	4	"Random Thoughts by JoJo"	Unknown	Unknown	July 22, 2013	104	N/A
5	5	"Worst Babysitter Ever: Relax"	Unknown	Unknown	July 29, 2013	105	N/A
6	6	"5 Signs You're Addicted to Instagram"	Unknown	Unknown	August 5, 2013	106	N/A
7	7	"The Worst DIYer: Zen Candle"	Unknown	Unknown	August 26, 2013	107	N/A
8	8	"Gnarly Mann"	Unknown	Unknown	September 2, 2013	108	N/A
9	9	"Pet Therapist: Hare Trouble"	Unknown	Unknown	September 9, 2013	109	N/A
10	10	"Terry the Tomboy: Back to School Guide"	Unknown	Unknown	September 16, 2013	110	N/A
11	11	"Txting 4 Rents"	Unknown	Unknown	September 23, 2013	111	N/A
12	12	"Kid History: Pillow Fight"	Unknown	Unknown	September 30, 2013	112	N/A
13	13	"Box Prank"	Unknown	Unknown	October 7, 2013	113	N/A
14	14	"The 5 Most Annoying Siblings"	Unknown	Unknown	October 21, 2013	114	N/A
15	15	"Zay Zay and Jo Jo's Halloween Tips"	Unknown	Unknown	October 28, 2013	115	N/A
16	16	"Worst Teacher Ever: Dodgeball"	Unknown	Unknown	November 4, 2013	116	N/A
17	17	"Us & Jan"	Unknown	Unknown	November 18, 2013	118	N/A
18	18	"Big Brother Problems"	Unknown	Unknown	December 2, 2013	119	N/A
19	19	"Hi-Tech History: Paul Revere"	Unknown	Unknown	December 9, 2013	117	N/A
20	20	"Swag Master J: Swagify for Christmas"	Unknown	Unknown	December 16, 2013	120	N/A

=== Season 2 (2014–2015) ===
No. overall	No. in season	Title	Directed by	Written by	Original release date	Prod. code	US viewers (millions)
21	1	"Teen Challenge"	Unknown	Unknown	May 5, 2014	205	1.6
Kira Kosarin and Jack Griffo guest host this episode.
22	2	"Tangent Girl: The Machine"	Unknown	Unknown	May 12, 2014	202	1.2
Smosh guest hosts this episode.
23	3	"Top 5 Ways to Defeat a Bully"	Unknown	Unknown	May 19, 2014	203	1.5
Cimorelli guest hosts this episode.
24	4	"Us & Jan: Cheer"	Unknown	Unknown	June 2, 2014	208	1.5
Grace Helbig guest hosts this episode.
25	5	"5 Ways to Reject a Guy"	Unknown	Unknown	June 9, 2014	207	1.4
Emblem3 guest hosts this episode.
26	6	"Terry the Tomboy: Hairbrush for Hair"	Unknown	Unknown	June 16, 2014	212	1.6
Lia Marie Johnson as Terry the Tomboy guest hosts this episode.
27	7	"High Tech History: Shakespeare"	Unknown	Unknown	June 28, 2014	209	0.7
Fifth Harmony guest hosts this episode.
28	8	"The Love Doctor #2"	Unknown	Unknown	July 12, 2014	210	1.5
5 Seconds of Summer guest hosts this episode.
29	9	"Nosey Rosie: Brad Pitt"	Unknown	Unknown	July 26, 2014	211	1.0
The Vamps guest host this episode.
30	10	"Pro Wrestling Family"	Unknown	Unknown	August 2, 2014	214	1.5
31	11	"Terry the Tomboy: What's in My Beach Bag?"	Unknown	Unknown	August 16, 2014	206	N/A
Rixton guest host this episode.
32	12	"Top 5 Worst Teachers"	Unknown	Unknown	September 13, 2014	204	N/A
Nathan Kress guest hosts this episode.
33	13	"Homework Like a Boss"	Unknown	Unknown	September 20, 2014	201	N/A
Sydney Park guest hosts this episode.
34	14	"Worst Babysitter Ever: Lemonade Stand"	Unknown	Unknown	September 27, 2014	216	N/A
Amber Montana and Curtis Harris guest host this episode.
35	15	"Kanye: What's in My Murse?"	Unknown	Unknown	October 4, 2014	213	N/A
Cameron Dallas and Nash Grier guest host this episode.
36	16	"Gillian's Island: Cooking Show"	Unknown	Unknown	November 1, 2014	217	N/A
MKTO guest hosts this episode.
37	17	"The Thank You Mask"	Unknown	Unknown	November 29, 2014	220	N/A
Benjamin Flores, Jr. and Breanna Yde guest host this episode.
38	18	"Terry the Tomboy: Guide to Winter Fashion"	Unknown	Unknown	February 7, 2015	218	1.14
39	19	"Gillian's Island"	Unknown	Unknown	February 28, 2015	215	N/A
Shawn Mendes guest hosts this episode.
40	20	"Ultimate Sports Fan"	Unknown	Unknown	March 7, 2015	219	1.25
Jenn McAllister guest hosts this episode.
