= The Thinning: New World Order =

2018 film by Michael Gallagher

- Promotional poster
- Directed by: Michael Gallagher
- Written by: Michael Gallagher; Steve Greene
- Produced by: Michael J. Gallagher; Jana Winternitz; Michael Wormser; Jo Henriquez; Greg Siegel; Steven Gelberg
- Starring: Logan Paul; Peyton List; Lia Marie Johnson; Calum Worthy; Matthew Glave; Michael Traynor
- Cinematography: Greg Cotten
- Edited by: Arndt-Wulf Peemoller
- Music by: Brandon Campbell
- Production companies: Cinemand; The Mark Gordon Company; Entertainment One; Legendary Digital Studios
- Distributed by: YouTube Originals
- Release date: October 17, 2018
- Running time: 89 minutes
- Country: United States
- Language: English

The Thinning: New World Order is a 2018 American social science fiction thriller web film and the sequel to the 2016 film The Thinning. As with the first film, the movie was directed by Michael J. Gallagher and stars Logan Paul as a young man struggling against a dystopian future in which population control is enforced through a school aptitude test. The film was released to YouTube Premium after being briefly shelved due to controversies surrounding its star, Logan Paul. It was generally panned by critics, with its excessive focus on main character Blake as well as lack of interesting themes highlighted as reasons of dislike.

== Plot ==
A week after the events of the first film, Governor Dean Redding prepares to run for the next presidential election. He attempts to get Laina Michaels' support for his campaign to mitigate his own controversy surrounding the Thinning. She declines but is later recruited by teacher Ms. Cole and Assuru Global security guard Jack to accept Redding's offer, in order to earn his trust and get close to him with hopes that this will help them end the Thinning for good.

Meanwhile, Blake is presumed dead by the public after he purposely failed the test, but he was actually taken to a slave labor facility to manufacture Assuru Global products along with other failed students called the Worthy (failed students chosen by the government to receive a second chance at life). He finds Ellie there, and they rekindle their relationship. Blake attempts to run away with Ellie, but they are caught by Mason King. DPC guards take Ellie away while Blake's leg is broken by Mason.

Eight months later, two weeks before election day, Laina continues her support for Redding's campaign. Kellan manages to crack the secret of the labor camps, saying Assuru Global doesn't have a manufacturing area in their campus and they have been insourcing military rations from a company called TXPak, enough for 100,000 people per year. Wendy Banks does not believe him, saying he doesn't have any evidence or proof. He visits Laina and secretly tells her everything and she believes him. When Kellan gets in his car, someone tries to suffocate him with a bag, but he triggers the car alarm and scares the killer. Laina then calls FBI agent Joanne Morris and tells her about Kellan's theory. Ms. Cole extracts Corrine and Joey out of the country only to be double-crossed by her co-worker.

As requested by Ms. Cole, Laina gets all the information from Redding's campaign manager, Georgina Preston's computer and manages to escape but Jack is caught. Laina is conned by Morris, and she tries to kill Laina. Laina manages to subdue Morris for a few seconds before jumping down into an apartment. She visits Kellan to copy the files of the camps from her drive to his computer. Kellan leaves, and gets in his car which explodes when he turns it on. Laina takes the drive and leaves. It is revealed that Morris and her men, both in league with Assuru, killed Kellan and were planning to kill Laina to tie up loose ends. Morris camps behind a staircase outside, while her men go inside Kellan's apartment. But Laina planned to blow up the apartment, killing Morris's men. When Laina attempts to escape, she is assaulted by Morris to force Laina to give her the drive, but Laina kills Morris by stabbing her with a box cutting knife, then shoving her down a flight of stairs, which snaps Morris' neck. Laina then makes it to BNC News where she turns over the drive to Wendy.

Blake convinces the Worthy to betray them and escape. Blake and Ellie remove their GPS trackers and escape outside, in the middle of the Texas desert. BNC helicopters arrive at the scene, catching video of Blake and Ellie. Mason catches them, and tries to kill Blake. Ellie kills Mason and they both get to safety.

Governor Redding wins the election and becomes President, only for the truth to be told. With full power and authority over the entire nation, Georgina arrests everyone who conspired against Redding and the Thinning. Laina, Blake, and Ellie discover that Georgina will end democracy and freedom in the nation. They are arrested as well but are intercepted by Jack who claims to work for the FBI. Jack tells them that they will defeat Redding and Georgina and take things back to normal.

== Cast ==
- Logan Paul as Blake Redding
- Peyton List as Laina Michaels
- Lia Marie Johnson as Ellie Harper
- Matthew Glave as Governor Dean Redding
- Calum Worthy as Kellan Woods
- Charles Melton as Cage
- Michael Traynor as Mason King
- Laura Harring as Georgina Preston
- Rome Flynn as Jack Prescott
- Jana Winternitz as Ms. Maggie Cole
- Amy Paffrath as Wendy Banks
- Presciliana Esparolini as Agent Joanne Morris
- Sydne Mikelle as Heather Forester
- Steven P. Cox as Wade Freeman
- Aria Lyric Leabu as Corrine Michaels
- Marcel Nahapetian as Joey Michaels
- Elizabeth Greer as Senator Elaine Davis
- Jason Horton as Mr. Leonard
- Spencer List as Tyson
- Brooke Nevin as Dr. Langley

== Production ==
Production for The Thinning: New World Order began in November 2017 and wrapped in December of the same year. Post-production on the film was temporarily stalled in January 2018 due to public controversy surrounding a video Paul shot and posted to YouTube featuring a dead body in Aokigahara forest in Japan. A representative of YouTube later posted a statement in October 2018 after it was announced that the film would release during the same month, stating that "The entire cast and crew worked extremely hard to complete this film last year. In fairness to all of them and the fans who have been asking for the sequel, we decided to release 'The Thinning: New World Order.'"

== Reception ==
The film has received negative reviews from The Verge, The Daily Dot, and Common Sense Media, the last of which criticized the film for what they saw as an amateurish execution. In their review, The Verge noted that one of the film's weaknesses was the focus on "Blake's nonstop gauntlet of physical and psychological trauma", as "Paul's YouTube persona is built on relentless enthusiasm, and his capacity for portraying sadness bottoms out around 'concerned bemusement.'" In turn, The Daily Dot noted that "The premise has some potential, but New World Order never finds anything interesting to do with it—and that's the film's fatal flaw."
