= Human population planning =

Practice of controlling rate of growth

External videos
- Could We Control Human OVER Population? BBC Earth Lab

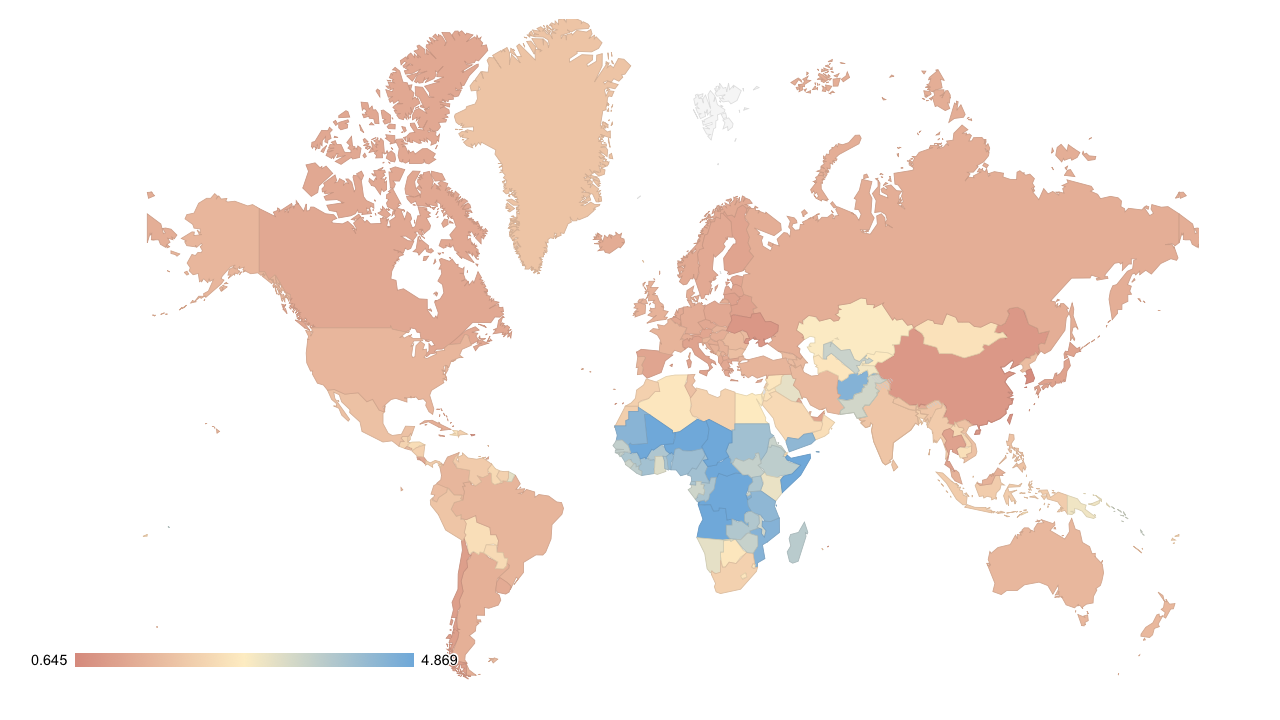
Map of countries by total fertility rate (2025–2026), referring to the average number of children that are born to a woman over her lifetime, (Estimated based on historical trends) according to the Geo Factbook. The gradation changes from red to blue as the fertility rate rises.

Human population planning is the practice of managing the growth rate of a human population. The practice, traditionally referred to as population control, had historically been implemented mainly with the goal of increasing population growth, though from the 1950s to the 1980s, concerns about overpopulation and its effects on poverty, the environment and political stability led to efforts to reduce population growth rates in many countries. More recently, however, several countries such as China, Japan, South Korea, Russia, Iran, Italy, Spain, Finland, Hungary and Estonia have begun efforts to boost birth rates once again, generally as a response to looming demographic crises.

While population planning can involve measures that improve people's lives by giving them greater control of their reproduction, a few programs, such as the Chinese government's "one-child policy and two-child policy", have employed coercive measures.

== Types ==
Three types of population planning policies pursued by governments can be identified:

1. Increasing or decreasing the overall population growth rate.
2. Increasing or decreasing the relative population growth of a subgroup of people, such as those of high or low intelligence or those with special abilities or disabilities. Policies that aim to boost relative growth rates are known as positive eugenics; those that aim to reduce relative growth rates are known as negative eugenics.
3. Attempts to ensure that all population groups of a certain type (e.g. all social classes within a society) have the same average rate of population growth.

== History ==
=== Ancient times through Middle Ages ===
A number of ancient writers have reflected on the issue of population. At about 300 BC, the Indian political philosopher Chanakya (c. 350-283 BC) considered population a source of political, economic, and military strength. Though a given region can house too many or too few people, he considered the latter possibility to be the greater evil. Chanakya favored the remarriage of widows (which at the time was forbidden in India), opposed taxes encouraging emigration, and believed in restricting asceticism to the aged.

In ancient Greece, Plato (427-347 BC) and Aristotle (384-322 BC) discussed the best population size for Greek city-states such as Sparta, and concluded that cities should be small enough for efficient administration and direct citizen participation in public affairs, but at the same time needed to be large enough to defend themselves against hostile neighbors. In order to maintain a desired population size, the philosophers advised that procreation, and if necessary, immigration, should be encouraged if the population size was too small. Emigration to colonies would be encouraged should the population become too large. Aristotle concluded that a large increase in population would bring, "certain poverty on the citizenry and poverty is the cause of sedition and evil." To halt rapid population increase, Aristotle advocated the use of abortion and the exposure of newborns (that is, infanticide).

Confucius (551-478 BC) and other Chinese writers cautioned that, "excessive growth may reduce output per worker, repress levels of living for the masses and engender strife." Some Chinese writers may also have observed that "mortality increases when food supply is insufficient; that premature marriage makes for high infantile mortality rates, that war checks population growth." It is particularly noteworthy that Han Fei (281-233 BC), long before Malthus, had already noted the conflict between a population growing at the exponential rate and a food supply growing at the arithmetic rate. Not only did he conclude that overpopulation was the root cause of the intensification of political and social conflict, but he also reduced traditional morality to an evolutionary product of material surplus rather than having any objective value. Nevertheless, during the Han Dynasty, the emperors enacted a large number of laws to encourage early marriage and childbirth.

Ancient Rome, especially in the time of Augustus (63 BC-AD 14), needed manpower to acquire and administer the vast Roman Empire. A series of laws were instituted to encourage early marriage and frequent childbirth. Lex Julia (18 BC) and the Lex Papia Poppaea (AD 9) are two well-known examples of such laws, which among others, provided tax breaks and preferential treatment when applying for public office for those who complied with the laws. Severe limitations were imposed on those who did not. For example, the surviving spouse of a childless couple could only inherit one-tenth of the deceased fortune, while the rest was taken by the state. These laws encountered resistance from the population which led to the disregard of their provisions and to their eventual abolition.

Tertullian, an early Christian author (ca. AD 160-220), was one of the first to describe famine and war as factors that can prevent overpopulation. He wrote: "The strongest witness is the vast population of the earth to which we are a burden and she scarcely can provide for our needs; as our demands grow greater, our complaints against Nature's inadequacy are heard by all. The scourges of pestilence, famine, wars, and earthquakes have come to be regarded as a blessing to overcrowded nations since they serve to prune away the luxuriant growth of the human race."

Ibn Khaldun, a North African polymath (1332–1406), considered population changes to be connected to economic development, linking high birth rates and low death rates to times of economic upswing, and low birth rates and high death rates to economic downswing. Khaldoun concluded that high population density rather than high absolute population numbers were desirable to achieve more efficient division of labour and cheap administration.

During the Middle Ages in Christian Europe, population issues were rarely discussed in isolation. Attitudes were generally pro-natalist in line with the Biblical command, "Be ye fruitful and multiply."

When Russian explorer Otto von Kotzebue visited the Marshall Islands in Micronesia in 1817, he noted that Marshallese families practiced infanticide after the birth of a third child as a form of population planning due to frequent famines.

=== 16th and 17th centuries ===
European cities grew more rapidly than before, and throughout the 16th century and early 17th century discussions on the advantages and disadvantages of population growth were frequent. Niccolò Machiavelli, an Italian Renaissance political philosopher, wrote, "When every province of the world so teems with inhabitants that they can neither subsist where they are nor remove themselves elsewhere... the world will purge itself in one or another of these three ways," listing floods, plague and famine. Martin Luther concluded, "God makes children. He is also going to feed them."

Jean Bodin, a French jurist and political philosopher (1530–1596), argued that larger populations meant more production and more exports, increasing the wealth of a country. Giovanni Botero, an Italian priest and diplomat (1540–1617), emphasized that, "the greatness of a city rests on the multitude of its inhabitants and their power," but pointed out that a population cannot increase beyond its food supply. If this limit was approached, late marriage, emigration, and the war would serve to restore the balance.

Richard Hakluyt, an English writer (1527–1616), observed that, "Through our longe peace and seldom sickness... we are grown more populous than ever heretofore;... many thousands of idle persons are within this realme, which, having no way to be sett on work, be either mutinous and seek alteration in the state, or at least very burdensome to the commonwealth." Hakluyt believed that this led to crime and full jails and in A Discourse on Western Planting (1584), Hakluyt advocated for the emigration of the surplus population. With the onset of the Thirty Years' War (1618–48), characterized by widespread devastation and deaths brought on by hunger and disease in Europe, concerns about depopulation returned.

== Population planning movement ==
In the 20th century, population planning proponents have drawn from the insights of Thomas Malthus, a British clergyman and economist who published An Essay on the Principle of Population in 1798. Malthus argued that, "Population, when unchecked, increases in a geometrical ratio. Subsistence only increases in an arithmetical ratio." He also outlined the idea of "positive checks" and "preventative checks." "Positive checks", such as diseases, wars, disasters, famines, and genocides are factors which Malthus believed could increase the death rate. "Preventative checks" were factors which Malthus believed could affect the birth rate such as moral restraint, abstinence and birth control. He predicted that "positive checks" on exponential population growth would ultimately save humanity from itself and he also believed that human misery was an "absolute necessary consequence".

World population growth rate 1950–2050

Malthus went on to explain why he believed that this misery affected the poor in a disproportionate manner.

There is a constant effort towards an increase in population which tends to subject the lower classes of society to distress and to prevent any great permanent amelioration of their condition…. The way in which these effects are produced seems to be this. We will suppose the means of subsistence in any country just equal to the easy support of its inhabitants. The constant effort towards population... increases the number of people before the means of subsistence are increased. The food, therefore which before supplied seven million must now be divided among seven million and a half or eight million. The poor consequently must live much worse, and many of them are reduced to severe distress.

Finally, Malthus advocated for the education of the lower class about the use of "moral restraint" or voluntary abstinence, which he believed would slow the growth rate.

Paul R. Ehrlich, a US biologist and environmentalist, published The Population Bomb in 1968, advocating stringent population planning policies. His central argument on population is as follows:

A cancer is an uncontrolled multiplication of cells; the population explosion is an uncontrolled multiplication of people. Treating only the symptoms of cancer may make the victim more comfortable at first, but eventually, he dies - often horribly. A similar fate awaits a world with a population explosion if only the symptoms are treated. We must shift our efforts from the treatment of the symptoms to the cutting out of cancer. The operation will demand many apparently brutal and heartless decisions. The pain may be intense. But the disease is so far advanced that only with radical surgery does the patient have a chance to survive.

—

World population 1950–2010

World population 1800-2000

In his concluding chapter, Ehrlich offered a partial solution to the "population problem", "[We need] compulsory birth regulation... [through] the addition of temporary sterilants to water supplies or staple food. Doses of the antidote would be carefully rationed by the government to produce the desired family size".

Ehrlich's views came to be accepted by many population planning advocates in the United States and Europe in the 1960s and 1970s. Since Ehrlich introduced his idea of the "population bomb", overpopulation has been blamed for a variety of issues, including increasing poverty, high unemployment rates, environmental degradation, famine and genocide. In a 2004 interview, Ehrlich reviewed the predictions in his book and found that while the specific dates within his predictions may have been wrong, his predictions about climate change and disease were valid. Ehrlich continued to advocate for population planning and co-authored the book The Population Explosion, released in 1990 with his wife Anne Ehrlich.

However, it is controversial as to whether human population stabilization will avert environmental risks. A 2014 study published in the Proceedings of the National Academy of Sciences of the United States of America found that given the "inexorable demographic momentum of the global human population", even mass mortality events and draconian one-child policies implemented on a global scale would still likely result in a population of 5 to 10 billion by 2100. Therefore, while reduced fertility rates are positive for society and the environment, the short term focus should be on mitigating the human impact on the environment through technological and social innovations, along with reducing overconsumption, with population planning being a long-term goal. A letter in response, published in the same journal, argued that a reduction in population by 1 billion people in 2100 could help reduce the risk of catastrophic climate disruption. A 2021 article published in Sustainability Science said that sensible population policies could advance social justice (such as by abolishing child marriage, expanding family planning services and reforms that improve education for women and girls) and avoid the abusive and coercive population control schemes of the past while at the same time mitigating the human impact on the climate, biodiversity and ecosystems by slowing fertility rates.

World population since 1800 in billions. Data from the United Nations projections in 2019.

Paige Whaley Eager argues that the shift in perception that occurred in the 1960s must be understood in the context of the demographic changes that took place at the time. It was only in the first decade of the 19th century that the world's population reached one billion. The second billion was added in the 1930s, and the next billion in the 1960s. 90 percent of this net increase occurred in developing countries. Eager also argues that, at the time, the United States recognised that these demographic changes could significantly affect global geopolitics. Large increases occurred in China, Mexico and Nigeria, and demographers warned of a "population explosion", particularly in developing countries from the mid-1950s onwards.

In the 1980s, tension grew between population planning advocates and women's health activists who advanced women's reproductive rights as part of a human rights-based approach. Growing opposition to the narrow population planning focus led to a significant change in population planning policies in the early 1990s.

== Population planning and economics ==
Opinions vary among economists about the effects of population change on a nation's economic health. US scientific research in 2009 concluded that the raising of a child cost about $16,000 yearly ($291,570 total for raising the child to its 18th birthday). In the US, the multiplication of this number with the yearly population growth will yield the overall cost of the population growth. Costs for other developed countries are usually of a similar order of magnitude.

Some economists, such as Thomas Sowell and Walter E. Williams, have argued that poverty and famine are caused by bad government and bad economic policies, not by overpopulation.

In his book The Ultimate Resource, economist Julian Simon argued that higher population density leads to more specialization and technological innovation, which in turn leads to a higher standard of living. He claimed that human beings are the ultimate resource since we possess "productive and inventive minds that help find creative solutions to man's problems, thus leaving us better off over the long run".

Simon also claimed that when considering a list of countries ranked in order by population density, there is no correlation between population density and poverty and starvation. Instead, if a list of countries is considered according to corruption within their respective governments, there is a significant correlation between government corruption, poverty and famine.

== Views on population planning ==
=== Birth rate reductions ===
==== Support ====
As early as 1798, Thomas Malthus argued in his Essay on the Principle of Population for implementation of population planning. Around the year 1900, Sir Francis Galton said in his publication Hereditary Improvement: "The unfit could become enemies to the State if they continue to propagate." In 1968, Paul Ehrlich noted in The Population Bomb, "We must cut the cancer of population growth", and "if this was not done, there would be only one other solution, namely the 'death rate solution' in which we raise the death rate through war-famine-pestilence, etc."

In the same year, another prominent modern advocate for mandatory population planning was Garrett Hardin, who proposed in his landmark 1968 essay Tragedy of the commons, society must relinquish the "freedom to breed" through "mutual coercion, mutually agreed upon." Later on, in 1972, he reaffirmed his support in his new essay "Exploring New Ethics for Survival", by stating, "We are breeding ourselves into oblivion." Many prominent personalities, such as Bertrand Russell, Margaret Sanger (1939), John D. Rockefeller, Frederick Osborn (1952), Isaac Asimov, Arne Næss and Jacques Cousteau have also advocated for population planning. Today, a number of influential people advocate population planning such as these:

- David Attenborough
- Christian de Duve, Nobel laureate
- Sara Parkin
- Jonathon Porritt, UK sustainable development commissioner
- William J. Ripple, lead author of the 2017 World Scientists' Warning to Humanity: A Second Notice
- Crispin Tickell

The head of the UN Millennium Project Jeffrey Sachs is also a strong proponent of decreasing the effects of overpopulation. In 2007, Jeffrey Sachs gave a number of lectures (2007 Reith Lectures) about population planning and overpopulation. In his lectures, called "Bursting at the Seams", he featured an integrated approach that would deal with a number of problems associated with overpopulation and poverty reduction. For example, when criticized for advocating mosquito nets he argued that child survival was, "by far one of the most powerful ways", to achieve fertility reduction, as this would assure poor families that the smaller number of children they had would survive.

==== Opposition ====
Critics of human population planning point out that attempts to curb human population growth have resulted in violations of human rights such as forced sterilization, particularly in China and India. In the latter half of the twentieth century, India's population reduction program received substantial funds and powerful incentives from Western countries and international population planning organizations to reduce India's growing population. This culminated in "the Emergency," a period in the mid-1970's where millions of people were forcibly sterilized. Violent resistance to forced sterilization led to police brutality and some instances of mass shootings of civilians by police. Critics also argue that supposedly voluntary population planning is often coerced. Some also believe that the environmental problems caused by supposed overpopulation are better explained by other factors, and that the goal of human population reduction does not justify the threat to human rights posed by population planning policies.

Other causes for opposition emerge from the feasibility of substantially impacting human population. According to some researchers, even rapid global adoption of a one-child policy would result in a world population exceeding 8 billion in 2050, and in a scenario involving catastrophic mass death of 2 billion people, world population would exceed 8 billion by 2100.

The Catholic Church has opposed abortion, sterilization, and artificial contraception as a general practice but especially in regard to population planning policies. Pope Benedict XVI has stated, "The extermination of millions of unborn children, in the name of the fight against poverty, actually constitutes the destruction of the poorest of all human beings." The reformed Theology pastor Dr. Stephen Tong also opposes the planning of human population.

== Pro-natalist policies ==
In 1946, Poland introduced a tax on childlessness, discontinued in the 1970s, as part of natalist policies in the Communist government. From 1941 to the 1990s, the Soviet Union had a similar tax to replenish the population losses incurred during the Second World War.

The Socialist Republic of Romania under Nicolae Ceaușescu severely repressed abortion, (the most common birth control method at the time) in 1966, and forced gynecological revisions and penalties for unmarried women and childless couples. The surge of the birth rate taxed the public services received by the decreței 770 ("Scions of the Decree 770") generation. A consequence of Ceaușescu's natalist policy is that large numbers of children ended up living in orphanages, because their parents could not cope. The vast majority of children who lived in the communist orphanages were not actually orphans, but were simply children whose parents could not afford to raise them. The Romanian Revolution of 1989 preceded a fall in population growth.

=== Balanced birth policies ===
Nativity in the Western world dropped during the interwar period. Swedish sociologists Alva and Gunnar Myrdal published Crisis in the Population Question in 1934, suggesting an extensive welfare state with universal healthcare and childcare, to increase overall Swedish birth rates, and level the number of children at a reproductive level for all social classes in Sweden. Swedish fertility rose throughout World War II (as Sweden was largely unharmed by the war) and peaked in 1946.

== Modern practice by country ==
=== Australia ===
Australia currently offers fortnightly Family Tax Benefit payments, a Child Care Subsidy based on income and other circumstances, and free immunizations.

=== China ===
==== One-child era (1979–2015) ====
The most significant population planning system in the world was China's one-child policy, in which, with various exceptions, having more than one child was discouraged. Unauthorized births were punished by fines, although there were also allegations of illegal forced abortions and forced sterilization. As part of China's planned birth policy, (work) unit supervisors monitored the fertility of married women and may decide whose turn it is to have a baby.

The Chinese government introduced the policy in 1978 to alleviate the social and environmental problems of China. According to government officials, the policy has helped prevent 400 million births. The success of the policy has been questioned, and reduction in fertility has also been attributed to the modernization of China. The policy is controversial both within and outside of China because of its manner of implementation and because of concerns about negative economic and social consequences e.g. female infanticide. In Asian cultures, the oldest male child has responsibility of caring for the parents in their old age. Therefore, it is common for Asian families to invest most heavily in the oldest male child, such as providing college, steering them into the most lucrative careers, and so on. To these families, having an oldest male child is paramount, so in a one-child policy, daughters have no economic benefit, so daughters, especially as a first child, are often targeted for abortion or infanticide. China introduced several government reforms to increase retirement payments to coincide with the one-child policy. During that time, couples could request permission to have more than one child.

China's population distribution in 2012, 2015 and 2020

According to Tibetologist Melvyn Goldstein, natalist feelings run high in China's Tibet Autonomous Region, among both ordinary people and government officials. Seeing population control "as a matter of power and ethnic survival" rather than in terms of ecological sustainability, Tibetans successfully argued for an exemption of Tibetan people from the usual family planning policies in China such as the one-child policy.

==== Two-child era (2016–2021) ====
In November 2014, the Chinese government allowed its people to conceive a second child under the supervision of government regulation.

On 29 October 2015, the ruling Chinese Communist Party announced that all one-child policies would be scrapped, allowing all couples to have two children. The change was needed to allow a better balance of male and female children, and to grow the young population to ease the problem of paying for the aging population. The law enacting the two-child policy took effect on 1 January 2016, and replaced the previous one-child policy.

==== Three-child era (2021–) ====
In May 2021, the Chinese government allowed its people to conceive a third child, in a move accompanied by "supportive measures" it regarded "conducive" to improving its "population structure, fulfilling the country's strategy of actively coping with an ageing population and maintaining the advantage, endowment of human resources" after declining birth rates recorded in the 2020 Chinese census.

=== Hungary ===
During the Second Orbán Government, Hungary increased its family benefits spending from one of the lowest rates in the OECD to one of the highest. In 2015, it amounted to nearly 4% of GDP.

=== India ===
Only those with two or fewer children are eligible for election to a local government.

Us two, our two ("Hum do, hamare do" in Hindi) is a slogan meaning one family, two children and is intended to reinforce the message of family planning thereby aiding population planning.

Facilities offered by government to its employees are limited to two children. The government offers incentives for families accepted for sterilization. Moreover, India was the first country to take measures for family planning back in 1952.

In the south west of India lies the long narrow coastal state of Kerala. Most of its thirty-two million inhabitants live off the land and the ocean, a rich tropical ecosystem watered by two monsoons a year. It's also one of India's most crowded states – but the population is stable because nearly everybody has small families… At the root of it all is education. Thanks to a long tradition of compulsory schooling for boys and girls Kerala has one of the highest literacy rates in the World. Where women are well educated they tend to choose to have smaller families… What Kerala shows is that you don't need aggressive policies or government incentives for birthrates to fall. Everywhere in the world where women have access to education and have the freedom to run their own lives, on the whole they and their partners have been choosing to have smaller families than their parents. But reducing birthrates is very difficult to achieve without a simple piece of medical technology, contraception.

— BBC Horizon (2009), How Many People Can Live on Planet Earth

In 2019, the Population Control Bill, 2019 bill was introduced in the Rajya Sabha in July 2019 by Rakesh Sinha. The purpose of the bill is to control the population growth of India.

=== Iran ===
After the Iran–Iraq War, Iran encouraged married couples to produce as many children as possible to replace population lost to the war.

Iran succeeded in sharply reducing its birth rate from the late 1980s to 2010. Mandatory contraceptive courses are required for both males and females before a marriage license can be obtained, and the government emphasized the benefits of smaller families and the use of contraception. This changed in 2012, when a major policy shift back towards increasing birth rates was announced. In 2014, permanent contraception and advertising of birth control were to be outlawed.

=== Israel ===
In Israel, Haredi families with many children receive economic support through generous governmental child allowances, government assistance in housing young religious couples, as well as specific funds by their own community institutions. Haredi women have an average of 6.7 children while the average Jewish Israeli woman has 3 children.

=== Japan ===
Japan has experienced a shrinking population for many years. The government is trying to encourage women to have children or to have more children – many Japanese women do not have children, or even remain single. A 2020 study found that there is widespread opposition to immigration in Japan.

Some Japanese localities, facing significant population loss, are offering economic incentives. Yamatsuri, a town of 7,000 just north of Tokyo, offers parents $4,600 for the birth of a child and $460 a year for 10 years.

=== Myanmar ===
In Myanmar, the Population planning Health Care Bill requires some parents to space each child three years apart. The Economist, in 2015, stated that the measure was expected to be used against the persecuted Muslim Rohingyas minority.

=== Russia ===
Russian President Vladimir Putin directed Parliament in 2006 to adopt a 10-year program to stop the sharp decline in Russia's population, principally by offering financial incentives and subsidies to encourage women to have children.

In August 2022, Russia revived the Soviet-era Mother Heroine award for women with 10 children.

In November 2024, Putin signed a bill into law that bans "childfree propaganda" to boost birthrates in Russia.

=== Singapore ===
Singapore has undergone two major phases in its population planning: first to slow and reverse the baby boom in the Post-World War II era; then from the 1980s onwards to encourage couples to have more children as the birth rate had fallen below the replacement-level fertility. In addition, during the interim period, eugenics policies were adopted.

The anti-natalist policies flourished in the 1960s and 1970s: initiatives advocating small families were launched and developed into the Stop at Two programme, pushing for two-children families and promoting sterilisation. In 1984, the government announced the Graduate Mothers' Scheme, which favoured children of more well-educated mothers; the policy was however soon abandoned due to the outcry in the general election of the same year. Eventually, the government became pro-natalist in the late 1980s, marked by its Have Three or More plan in 1987. Singapore pays $3,000 for the first child, $9,000 in cash and savings for the second; and up to $18,000 each for the third and fourth.

=== Spain ===
In 2017, the government of Spain appointed Edelmira Barreira, as "Government Commissioner facing the Demographic Challenge", in a pro-natalist attempt to reverse a negative population growth rate.

=== Turkey ===
In May 2012, Turkey's Prime Minister Recep Tayyip Erdogan argued that abortion is murder and announced that legislative preparations to severely limit the practice are underway. Erdogan also argued that abortion and C-section deliveries are plots to stall Turkey's economic growth. Prior to this move, Erdogan had repeatedly demanded that each couple have at least three children.

=== United States ===
Enacted in 1970, Title X of the Public Health Service Act provides access to contraceptive services, supplies and information to those in need. Priority for services is given to people with low incomes. The Title X Family Planning program is administered through the Office of Population Affairs under the Office of Public Health and Science. It is directed by the Office of Family Planning. In 2007, Congress appropriated roughly $283 million for family planning under Title X, at least 90 percent of which was used for services in family planning clinics. Title X is a vital source of funding for family planning clinics throughout the nation, which provide reproductive health care, including abortion.

The education and services supplied by the Title X-funded clinics support young individuals and low-income families. The goals of developing healthy families are accomplished by helping individuals and couples decide whether to have children and when the appropriate time to do so would be.

Title X has made the prevention of unintended pregnancies possible. It has allowed millions of American women to receive necessary reproductive health care, plan their pregnancies and prevent abortions. Title X is dedicated exclusively to funding family planning and reproductive health care services.

Title X as a percentage of total public funding to family planning client services has steadily declined from 44% of total expenditures in 1980 to 12% in 2006. Medicaid has increased from 20% to 71% in the same time. In 2006, Medicaid contributed $1.3 billion to public family planning.

In the early 1970s, the United States Congress established the Commission on Population Growth and the American Future (Chairman John D. Rockefeller III), which was created to provide recommendations regarding population growth and its social consequences. The Commission submitted its final recommendations in 1972, which included promoting contraceptives and liberalizing abortion regulations, for example.

==== Natalism in the United States ====
In a 2004 editorial in The New York Times, David Brooks expressed the opinion that the relatively high birth rate of the United States in comparison to Europe could be attributed to social groups with "natalist" attitudes. The article is referred to in an analysis of the Quiverfull movement. However, the figures identified for the demographic are extremely low.

Former US Senator Rick Santorum made natalism part of his platform for his 2012 presidential campaign. Many of those categorized in the General Social Survey as "Fundamentalist Protestant" are more or less natalist, and have a higher birth rate than "Moderate" and "Liberal" Protestants. However, Rick Santorum is not a Protestant but a practicing Catholic.

=== Uzbekistan ===
It is reported that Uzbekistan has been pursuing a policy of forced sterilizations, hysterectomies and IUD insertions since the late 1990s in order to impose population planning.

=== United Kingdom ===
In the United Kingdom, access to contraception has been expanded through NHS-commissioned services, including the Pharmacy Contraception Service (PCS) launched in 2023 to initiate and continue oral contraception in community pharmacies, thereby increasing choice and relieving pressure on GP and specialist services. A 2023 study of a free online contraception service operating in the UK found the service was accessible to ethnically and socioeconomically diverse users, but that users obtaining emergency contraception did not commonly transition to ongoing oral methods, indicating that access initiatives may need to be paired with proactive counselling to support method continuation. More evidence shows that pharmacy-based delivery of contraception is acceptable to adolescents in high-income settings, supporting UK policy efforts to diversify access points beyond traditional clinics.

== See also ==
- Population ethics – Branch of philosophy concerned with population changes
- Antinatalism – Value judgment that procreation is unethical
- Birth control – Prevention of human pregnancy
- Dependency ratio – Age-population ratio of those in the labor force to those not in the labor force
- Eugenics – Effort to improve purported human genetic quality
- Human overpopulation – Condition wherein human numbers exceed the carrying capacity of the environment
- List of population concern organizations
- Malthusianism – Idea about population growth and food supply
- Overconsumption – Resource use exceeding carrying capacity
- Steady-state economy – Constant capital and population size
- Population ageing – Increasing median age in a population
- Population growth – Increase in the number of individuals in a population
- Pledge two or fewer – UK-based charity (campaign for small families)
- Planet of the Humans – 2019 environmental documentary film by Jeff Gibbs
- Voluntary Human Extinction Movement – Environmental movement
- Populationism

=== Fiction ===
- Logan's Run (book) - State-mandated euthanasia at 21 for all people (30 in the film) to conserve resources.
- Make Room! Make Room! (book) - Novel, explores the consequence of overpopulation.
- Ishmael (Quinn novel) - Explores the biological and ecological causes of overpopulation which is a result of increased carrying capacity for humans. The planning proposal is to limit that capacity (see Food Race).
- Avengers: Infinity War (film) - Thanos uses the Infinity Gauntlet to kill half of all life in the universe, achieving his goal of maintaining ecological balance.
- Inferno (film) - A billionaire has created a virus that will kill 50% of the world's population to save the other 50%. His followers try to release the virus after his suicide.
- Shadow Children (book series) - Families are allowed two children maximum, and "shadow children" (third children and beyond) are subject to be killed.
- 2 B R 0 2 B (book) - Aging is cured and each new life requires the sacrifice of another to maintain a stable population.
- 2BR02B: To Be or Naught to Be (film) - Based on the above book.
- The Thinning and The Thinning: New World Order (film series) - Involves a dystopian United States enforcing population control via aptitude test and an authoritarian police force known as the Department of Population Control.
