= Population regulation =

Population regulation may refer to:

- Population control
- Wildlife management
- Human population planning
