= The Diofield Chronicle =

Role-playing video game

- Developers: Square Enix; Lancarse
- Publisher: Square Enix
- Director: Takahiro Kumagai
- Producer: Shigeyuki Hirata
- Artists: Isamu Kamikokuryo; Taiki
- Writer: Yuu Oshima
- Composers: Brandon Campbell; Ramin Djawadi
- Platforms: Microsoft Windows; Nintendo Switch; PlayStation 4; PlayStation 5; Xbox One; Xbox Series X/S
- Release: September 22, 2022
- Genre: Strategy role-playing
- Mode: Single-player

The Diofield Chronicle is a strategy role-playing video game co-developed by Square Enix and Lancarse. It was released in September 2022 for the Nintendo Switch, PlayStation 4, PlayStation 5, Xbox One, Xbox Series X/S, and Windows platforms.

== Gameplay ==
The Diofield Chronicle plays as a strategy role-playing video game. Unlike Final Fantasy Tactics, it is not tile-based in its movement, but instead allows for more free directional movement like XCOM. The game features real-time strategy elements, with the battle system being named the "Real-Time Tactical Battle System", an allusion to the Active Time Battle system.

The player controls a party of characters to engage in tactical battles, completing missions such as vanquishing enemies, defending a stronghold, escorting an ally, or capturing points on a map. Similar to Fire Emblem, the viewpoint shifts as the battles themselves play out. The party earns skill points at the end of each mission, which can be used to upgrade different character abilities.

== Plot ==
The Diofield Chronicle takes place on a fictional war-torn continent, where the Kingdom of Alletain sits in the close vicinity of a conflict between the Trovelt-Schoevian Empire and the Rowetale Alliance. When the Empire ends up defeating the Alliance, they turn their attention to Alletain. The game follows the mercenary group related to the Alletain called the "Blue Foxes". The four heads of the group are Andrias Rhondarson, a royal bodyguard who knows ancient sorcery, Fredret Lester, his childhood friend, Iscarion Colchester, an archer and former noble, and Waltaquin Redditch, a mage noblewoman.

== Development ==
The game was first announced on March 9, 2022, as part of Sony's "State of Play" presentations outlining future games coming to their PlayStation platforms. It was one of two games announced by Square Enix at the presentation, alongside Valkyrie Elysium. While the latter was only announced for PlayStation 4, PlayStation 5, and Windows, The Diofield Chronicle was later revealed to additionally be coming to Nintendo Switch, Xbox One, and Xbox Series X/S platforms. The game has character design by Taiki (character designer on Lord of Vermilion series) and also features character art from designer Isamu Kamikokuryo, who previously did art for Final Fantasy XII and Final Fantasy XIII, and was noted to have an art style similar to Final Fantasy at times, though the game share no official ties. Square Enix is co-developing the title with Japanese studio Lancarse, who had previously co-developed Shin Megami Tensei: Strange Journey with Atlus. Music is composed by Ramin Djawadi and Brandon Campbell, both of which had previously worked on the Game of Thrones television series. The game was released worldwide on September 22, 2022, following the release of a demo on August 10.

== Reception ==
Reception

Aggregate scores
| Aggregator | Score |
|---|---|
| Metacritic | NS: 67/100; PC: 66/100; PS5: 71/100; XSXS: 78/100 |
| OpenCritic | 41% recommend |

Review scores
| Publication | Score |
|---|---|
| Destructoid | 7/10 |
| Easy Allies | 6.5/10 |
| GameSpot | 5/10 |
| Hardcore Gamer | 3.5/5 |
| IGN | 7/10 |
| Nintendo Life | 7/10 |
| Push Square | 6/10 |
| RPGamer | 3.5/5 |
| RPGFan | 78/100 |
| VG247 | 3/5 |

The Diofield Chronicle received "mixed or average" reviews for the Nintendo Switch, PlayStation 5 and Windows, and "generally favorable" reviews for the Xbox Series X/S, according to review aggregator Metacritic.

The Nintendo Switch version of The Diofield Chronicle sold 6,415 physical copies within its first week of release in Japan, making it the eighth bestselling retail game of the week in the country.

== Manga adaptation ==
A manga adaptation by Minori Tsukahara and Ataru Arata began serialization in Square Enix's Manga UP! website and app on September 8, 2022.
