= The Leader (film) =

American historical crime film

- Directed by: Michael Gallagher
- Screenplay by: Michael Gallagher
- Produced by: Jana Gallagher; Michael Wormser; Michael Gallagher; Joel David Moore; Matt Murphie
- Starring: Tim Blake Nelson; Vera Farmiga; Jim Parsons; Grace Caroline Currey; Simon Rex
- Cinematography: Ben Mullen
- Edited by: Joel Blacker
- Music by: Joseph Bishara
- Production companies: Cinemand Films; Balcony 9 Productions
- Distributed by: Dark Sky Films
- Release date: June 5, 2026 (Tribeca Festival)
- Running time: 104 minutes
- Countries: United States; Canada
- Language: English

The Leader is a 2026 American historical crime film written and directed by Michael Gallagher and starring Vera Farmiga and Tim Blake Nelson as the leaders of the suicide-cult who became known as Heaven's Gate who in 1997 perpetrated the biggest ever mass suicide on U. S. soil.

== Premise ==
Nettles and Applewhite develop a religion that would become known as Heaven's Gate, a UFO cult that told followers they could transform into immortal extraterrestrials and ascend to heaven, and led to the mass suicide of 39 people in identical clothing coinciding with the Hale-Bopp comet passing Earth in 1997.

== Cast ==
- Tim Blake Nelson as Marshall Applewhite aka "Do", mentally unstable co-founder of Heaven's Gate
- Vera Farmiga as Bonnie Nettles aka "Ti", co-founder of Heaven's Gate
- Jim Parsons as Warren, a recovering sex and alcohol addict and devout follower of Heaven's Gate
- Grace Caroline Currey as Michelle, a follower of Heaven's Gate who gets into a secret relationship with David
- Simon Rex as David, a follower of Heaven's Gate who gets into a secret relationship with Michelle
- Kaitlyn Kemp as Terrie Nettles, the daughter of "Ti"
- J.B Yowell as Hayden
- Don McManus as Dr Blackbourne
- Kelly Lynn Reiter as Lee, a follower of Heaven's Gate
- William Mapother as Reverend Applewhite, Marshall's father
- Matthew Glave as Joseph Nettles
- Jana Gallagher as Susan Chickles
- Geoffrey Arend as Kevin, a Sales Representative
- Danielle Vasinova as Louise Applewhite, Marshall's mother
- Paten Hughes as Karen
- Molly Robbins as Joy
- Jill Winternitz as Holly
- Ryan M. Darling as Dr Radford
- Blake Robbins as Deputy Willis
- Randolph Parks as Facody, a follower of Heaven's Gate
- Grace McDonald as Abby

== Production ==
In February 2023, it was reported that Tim Blake Nelson, Vera Farmiga, and Simon Rex would star in The Leader, to be written and directed by Michael Gallagher. In October 2023, Michael C Hall and Grace Caroline Currey joined the cast. In July 2025, it was announced that Jim Parsons had replaced Hall with Matthew Glave, William Mapother, JB Yowell, Kelly Lynn Reiter, Danielle Vasinova, Blake Robbins, Jana Gallagher, Paten Hughes, Molly Robbins, and Jill Winternitz rounding out the cast. Filming took place in Louisville, Kentucky in July 2025.

== Release ==
The Leader premiered at the Tribeca Festival on June 5, 2026. Ahead of its world premiere, the distribution rights were acquired by Altitude Films for the UK and Sphere Films in Canada. The Leader made its Canadian premiere at the Fantasia Film Festival with Vera Farmiga, director Michael Gallagher, and composer Joseph Bishara in attendance.

The Leader won the grand jury prize for Best Feature Film at the San Diego International Film Festival and the Director's Choice Award for Best Ensemble Cast at the Woods Hole Film Festival shared by Vera Farmiga, Tim Blake Nelson, Jim Parsons, Grace Caroline Currey, and Simon Rex.

Lead actor Tim Blake Nelson was awarded the Virtuoso Award at the Virginia Film Festival following a screening and Q&A of The Leader.

== Reception ==
On review aggregator website Rotten Tomatoes, 95% of critics have given The Leader a positive review based on 21 reviews, with an average rating of 7.3/10.

Pete Hammond of Deadline wrote: "Tim Blake Nelson And Vera Farmiga Superb In Powerful Depiction Of Real-Life ‘Heaven’s Gate’ Suicide Cult", highlighting the performances in his review, stating that "a brilliant turn from Tim Blake Nelson, who simply seems to inhabit this deeply disturbed man also known as Do; and by a determined but not crazy Nettles aka Ti, played with sheer force and belief by the always compelling Vera Farmiga, a role she seems born to play. Jim Parsons is exceptional as well here as is Simon Rex, who undergoes a cringe-inducing punishment for his transgressions".

Owen Gleiberman of Variety wrote a rave review, stating: "Michael Gallagher's movie is the most potent drama about life inside a cult since "Martha Marcy May Marlene"; he also highlighted the strong filmmaking and performances, stating: “The Leader as a dramatic experience, is creepy as hell, but as written and directed by Michael Gallagher, it’s also authentic and sharply told, and it’s inquiring about the right things — namely, why would people descend to this, and what, if anything, does it have to say about us? It’s clear, from the movie, that the members of the Heaven’s Cult were a bunch of sick puppies, and so was Marshall Applewhite, who’s played by Tim Blake Nelson in a subtle and unnerving performance of insidious wackadoo force. Jim Parsons, in an incredibly impressive performance, is Warren, the cult’s most devoted member, who has put his addiction to alcohol and sex behind him by renouncing his very identity. Parsons shows you the fearfully obedient soldier and the wounded car wreck inside. And Simon Rex and Grace Caroline Currey make their mark as two new recruits who don’t know what they’re getting into. They try to be good members, but they fall into a sexual affair, which results in the most horrifying masochistic punishment I have ever seen in a cult drama".

Julian Roman of MovieWeb wrote a review highlighting the awards-worthy performances in the film, stating: "Tim Blake Nelson nails every disturbing facet of Applewhite in extraordinary detail", going on to say that "Vera Farmiga mesmerizes as Nettles", and concluded that "A key supporting performance will be equally lauded with awards consideration in the fall. Jim Parsons is magnificent as Warren, the longest and most loyal Heaven's Gate disciple".
