= Blackout (2022 film) =

- Poster
- Directed by: Sam Macaroni
- Written by: Van B. Nguyen
- Produced by: Michael Mendelsohn; Jim Steele
- Starring: Josh Duhamel; Abbie Cornish; Nick Nolte; Omar Chaparro
- Music by: Brandon Campbell
- Production companies: Patriot Pictures; Itaca Films; Lost Winds Entertainment; XYZ Films
- Distributed by: Netflix
- Release date: October 12, 2022 (Netflix)
- Running time: 81 minutes
- Country: United States
- Language: English

Blackout is a 2022 American action crime thriller film directed by Sam Macaroni and starring Josh Duhamel, Abbie Cornish, Nick Nolte and Omar Chaparro.

== Synopsis ==
An undercover DEA agent wakes up with amnesia in a Mexican mental institution. While several drug cartels are looking for him, he gradually remembers his identity, though he's skeptical about some aspects.

== Cast ==
- Josh Duhamel as Cain
- Abbie Cornish as Anna
- Nick Nolte as DEA Agent Ethan McCoy
- Omar Chaparro as Eddie
- Bárbara de Regil
- Jose Sefami
- Hernan Del Riego

== Production ==
Principal photography began in Mexico City on November 5, 2020.

== Release ==
The film was released on Netflix on October 12, 2022.

== Reception ==
The film has a 20% rating on Rotten Tomatoes based on five reviews.
