= Audrey Whitby =

American actress

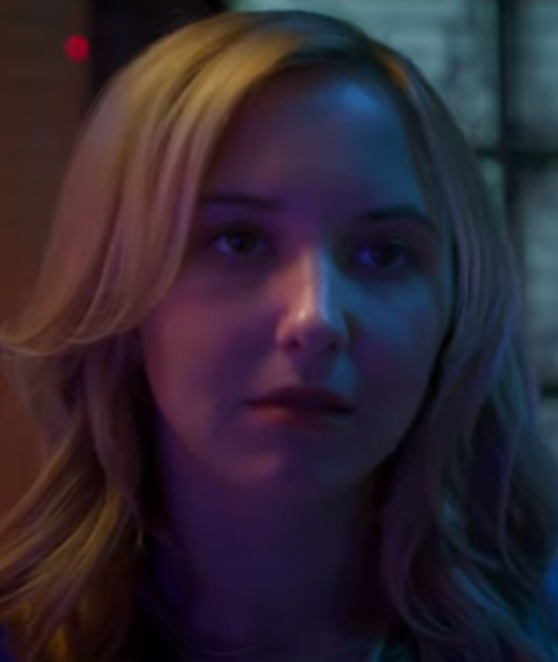
- Whitby in 2018 portraying Allie Stein from Guilty Party
- Born: April 10, 1996 (age 30); Murfreesboro, Tennessee, U.S.
- Occupation: Actress
- Years active: 2011–present

External image
- Whitby at the Kid's Choice Awards in 2014.

Audrey Whitby (born April 10, 1996) is an American actress. She is known for her many appearances on AwesomenessTV including starring in the cast of Betch: A Sketch Show, and for her recurring roles as Audrey Vale on the Disney Channel sketch comedy spinoff series So Random! and as Cherry Seinfeld on the Nickelodeon television comedy series The Thundermans.

== Early life ==
Whitby was born on April 10, 1996, in Murfreesboro, Tennessee, and raised in Granger, Indiana. Her sister, Madeline Whitby, is also an actress.

== Career ==
Whitby started acting when she was six in community theater and started auditioning in Chicago when she was eight. Whitby moved to Los Angeles when she was 12.

Whitby's first major role was on the Disney Channel program So Random! She later appeared on the Disney Channel series Liv and Maddie, and then played the long-time recurring character of Cherry Seinfeld on the Nickelodeon television series The Thundermans and its 2024 television film follow-up, The Thundermans Return.

Whitby worked for AwesomenessTV, including in its television series of the same name, its Terry the Tomboy film, and its followup comedy sketch series Betch: A Sketch Show, which also stars her sister Madeline and which was released on go90. In 2017, she co-starred on the AwesomenessTV drama series In the Vault which was also released on go90.

In June 2023, it was reported that Whitby had been cast in the Nickelodeon television show Zoey 101 sequel film, Zoey 102 which was released on July 27 of the same year as Lyric Reese, the sister of Matthew Underwood's character, Logan Reese.

== Personal life ==
In 2016, Whitby joined in an anti-Trump protest in Los Angeles, California, which led to her getting arrested by police officers along with other protesters.

== Filmography ==
Year	Title	Role	Notes
2010	BrainSurge	Herself	Season 2, episode 2
2011	Trippin'	L'il f*cker	Film
2011–2012	So Random!	Audrey Vale / various characters	Recurring role; 18 episodes
2012	Austin & Ally	Tilly Thompson	Episode: "Bloggers & Butterflies"
2012	Dog with a Blog	Sabrina	Episodes: "Stan of the House", "The Bone Identity"
2012	Scared Sweet	Hannah	Short film
2012	Bad Fairy	Nic DiRizzo	Episode: "Outcomes"
2013–2014	AwesomenessTV	various characters	Regular role
2013–2018	The Thundermans	Cherry	Recurring role
2014	Terry the Tomboy	Britannica	Television movie
2014	Pro Wrestling Family	The Amazing Mia	Short film
2015–2016	Liv and Maddie	Aubrey Banfield	4 episodes (seasons 2–3)
2015–2018	Betch: A Sketch Show	Herself / various characters	Main role
2016	Accidental Switch	Katey Williams	Television movie; also known as A Mother's Revenge
2016–2017	Paradise Run	Herself	4 episodes (seasons 2–3)
2017	Nicky, Ricky, Dicky & Dawn	Tori	Episode: "One Quadzy Summer"
2018	The Perfect Mother	Peyton Kelly	Television movie; also known as Almost Perfect
2018	Guilty Party	Allie Stein	Main role (season 2)
2019	Fam	Beth	Episode: "Party Girl"
2023	Zoey 102	Lyric	Paramount+ film
2024	The Thundermans Return	Cherry	Paramount+ film
2025	The Thundermans: Undercover	Cherry	2 episodes
