= Terry the Tomboy =

2014 television film

- Genre: Comedy
- Written by: Wade Randolph
- Directed by: Wade Randolph
- Starring: Lia Marie Johnson; Audrey Whitby; Noland Ammon; Brandon Soo Hoo; Tiffany Espensen; Charlie Depew
- Country of origin: United States
- Original language: English

Production
- Producers: Brian Robbins; Eric Acosta; Scott Levine; Samuel Limor; Brin Lukens; Shauna Phelan; Harris Sherman
- Cinematography: Samuel Kim
- Running time: 73 minutes
- Budget: $550,000

Original release
- Network: Nickelodeon
- Release: June 21, 2014

Terry the Tomboy is a 2014 comedy television film starring Lia Marie Johnson and written and directed by Wade Randolph.

The film is a spinoff of the AwesomenessTV sketch series "Terry the Tomboy". The film was distributed by Nickelodeon and produced by Brian Robbins. The film premiered on Nickelodeon on June 21, 2014.

== Plot ==
Terry is excited that summer is here and school is out. In anticipation she and her best friend Duncanty create a list of things that they want to accomplish this summer. The most important is to win the county fair pie eating contest. Terry hears a noise and meets a hot boy named Brett who is moving in across the street from Terry. Right when Terry is about to talk to him, Brittanica, Terry's nemesis and former friend, swoops in and tells Brett lies about Terry. Terry gets mad and goes home.

As summer passes, Terry feels awkward and sick. Terry realizes she is in love with Brett, but Brittanica gets in the way so she asks her brother for help and he advises her to become a cheerleader. Terry gives up on cheerleading after an infamous failure at the tryouts. Desperate, Terry becomes a girly girl to catch Brett's eye. At the very end of the Summer, Terry looks for Brett at the Ferris wheel, but when Terry gets there, she sees Brett and Brittanica already on the ride, kissing.

Terry is crushed, but then remembers the pie eating contest. She goes to Duncanty's house and gets him to go to the contest with her. They go to the contest together. Terry wins and is happy, but then sees Duncanty talking to another girl and gets jealous. She walks over to them and pushes the girl down into the mud and tells Duncanty that she needs him instead of Brett and that Duncanty is the only boy she will ride the Ferris wheel with. They share a kiss.

After that, Terry feels that they should stay friends and not go too fast. The film ends with Terry saying that the summer was fun and feels free. She doesn't feel awkward about Brett (who broke up with Brittanica at the fair after discovering her lies). The film ends with all the characters at a dance party.

== Cast ==
- Lia Marie Johnson as Terry the Tomboy
- Noland Ammon as Duncanty
- Charlie Depew as Brett
- Audrey Whitby as Brittanica
- Christopher Bones as Brian
- Brandon Soo Hoo as Napkin Rapkin
- Jennifer Elise Cox as Unfathomable Aunt Peyton
- Tiffany Espensen as Wallaine Rapkin
- John Michael Higgins as Dr. Larry

== Release ==
The film was produced by AwesomenessTV and distributed by Nickelodeon. The film opened on June 21, 2014 on Nickelodeon. It is the first film from Nickelodeon that is based on an AwesomenessTV sketch since they bought the YouTube channel in 2013.
