= Lia Marie Johnson =

American actress, singer, and internet personality (born 1996)

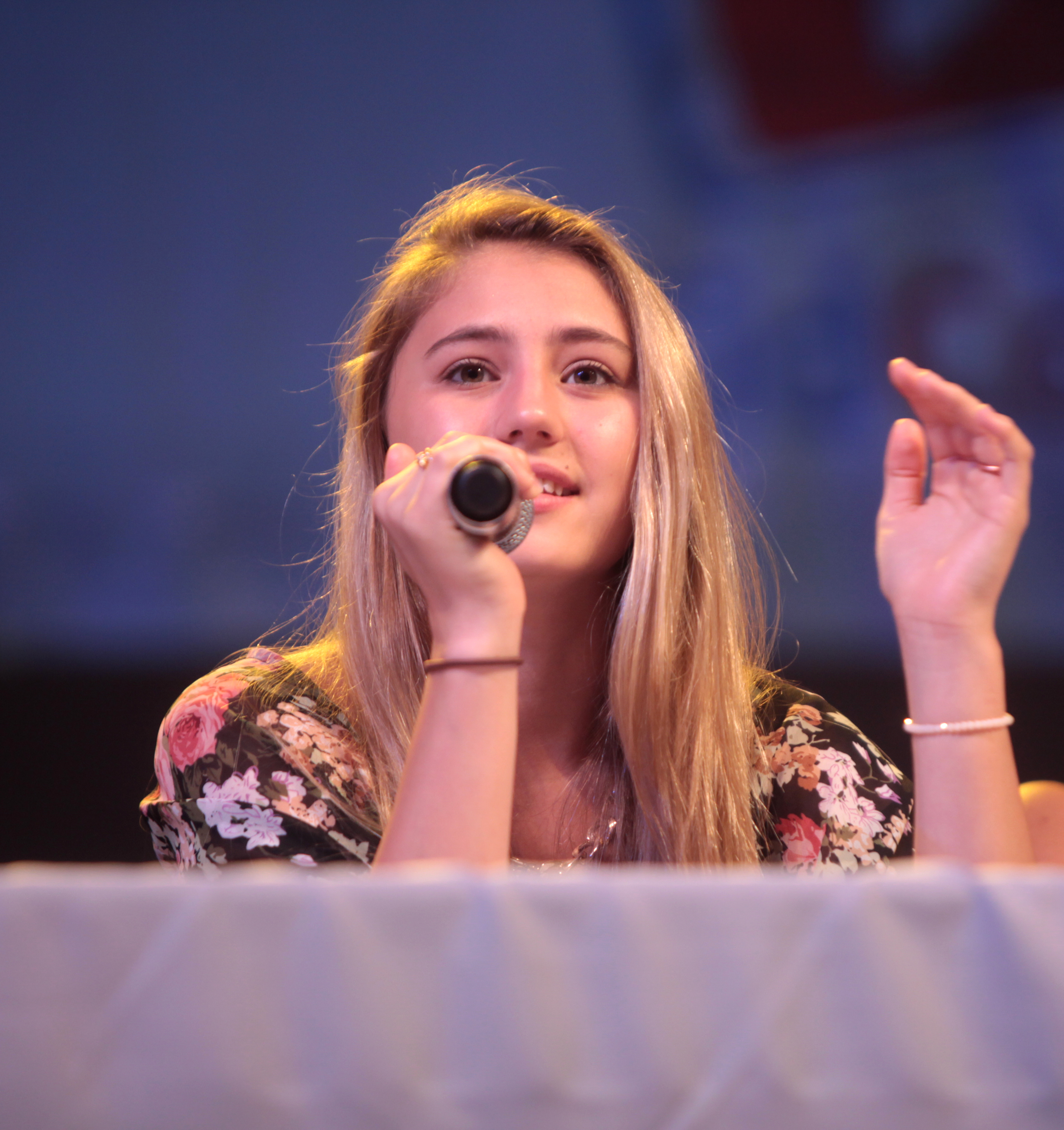
- Johnson at the 2014 VidCon at the Anaheim Convention Center
- Born: November 23, 1996 (age 29); San Diego, California, U.S.
- Occupations: Internet personality; actress; singer
- Years active: 2007–present
- Spouse: Charlie Hudson (m. 2023)

Lia Marie Johnson (born November 23, 1996) is an American internet personality, actress, and singer. She first received recognition for her work on YouTube, rising to fame for creating skits and song covers, and for her appearances in the Fine Brothers web series Kids React (2010–2011). She then played Terry the Tomboy in the sketch comedy series AwesomenessTV (2013–2014) and the Nickelodeon television movie Terry the Tomboy (2014).

Johnson self-released her debut single "Moment Like You" in 2015, and signed with Capitol Records the following year. She then starred in the YouTube Premium films The Thinning (2016) and The Thinning: New World Order (2018), and in the web series T@gged (2016–2018). She independently released her debut extended play Pomegranate in 2024.

== Early life ==
Johnson was born in San Diego, California, but moved to Wahiawa, Hawaii at six months old. She has four sisters and a brother. Her family eventually settled in California.

== Career ==
Johnson's YouTube account was created in 2007, with videos uploaded by her mother which featured her performances at talent shows, and church recitals. After two years, Johnson began to control the output of the channel, creating content that has come to include personal commentary, sketch comedy, and musical performances. Between 2009 and 2011, Johnson released music as part of the girl group Pink Army.

In 2010, Johnson began to work with the Fine Brothers as a recurring guest on their Kids React series. This exposure increased the traffic to her own channel and became an early source of her online fame. In the aftermath of the initial series episodes, she was surprised by the phenomenon of strangers knowing her and approaching her as fans, and remarked "I think Kids React was my very first viral video, 'cus everyone knew my name after that."

In 2011, Johnson was added to the recurring cast of the spin-off series Teens React, and in 2014 was moved again to the newly established YouTubers React, which featured herself and various well known YouTube personalities. In 2014, Johnson appeared at the Nickelodeon Kids' Choice Awards, and starred in Terry the Tomboy, a spin-off film based on the eponymous character she portrays on the Nickelodeon sketch comedy series, AwesomenessTV. She was profiled by Adweek in 2014 as one of the "biggest young stars on YouTube".

In 2015, she covered the single "Latch" by Disclosure, singing with Alejandro Luis Manzano of Boyce Avenue, and released it on YouTube. The song was originally performed by singer Sam Smith. Johnson has also been featured on the covers of Adweek and BYou Magazine. On January 9, 2015, Johnson released her first single, "Moment Like You", along with a music video which can be found on her YouTube channel. She appeared in the music video for Post Malone's single "Go Flex", which was released on April 28, 2016.

On September 28, she explained to her fans that she had signed to Capitol Records, and was continuing to work on the music album she had been recording for the previous two years. The following month she released her first single produced by Howard Benson through Capitol Records titled "DNA" which surpassed 1 million Spotify streams. In November of that year, she interviewed then-current president Barack Obama. On February 17, 2017, Johnson released her second single "Cold Heart Killer". The music video for the song was released on March 10, 2017. A year later, Johnson debuted her third single "Champagne" on May 17, 2018.

Starting mid November 2019, Lia teased a new project on her Instagram page, with one promotional photo being posted every day. Seven days later, Lia announced her fourth single titled, "Moonflower," on November 23, 2019. Johnson released her fifth single, "Like a God", on March 12, 2020.

In the first half of 2021, Johnson began posting personal videos and covers on her YouTube channel again after four years of inactivity. She released the single "Lifts" on January 1, 2021, followed by "Nectar" on March 19 and "Venus Sunrise" on April 30. An accompanying music video was issued for all three songs.

In October 2022, Johnson started teasing upcoming music that she had been preparing for 2023.

== Personal life ==
On January 2, 2020, Johnson streamed on Instagram Live what appeared to be her intoxicated in a room. During the live stream, an older male alleged by those close to Johnson as being her producer since she was 15, Steven Wetherbee, is heard talking and seen wrapping his arms around Johnson and kissing her. The older male then repeatedly asks Johnson whether or not she is on Instagram, warning her to stay off of it as it could damage his career. In a stream later the same evening, a male voice asks about Instagram again, then Instagram Live, and then takes Johnson's phone away. His face is briefly on the stream before it is paused and eventually ends.

Fans reacted to the video with calls to action out of concern Johnson was suffering potential grooming and abuse from Wetherbee, due to the vast age difference between the two (Johnson being 23 and Wetherbee 67 at the time) and Johnson's recent risqué streams and apparent intoxicated behavior, as well as her song "DNA" which talks about and has visuals of repeating cycles of alcoholism and domestic violence. However, neither Wetherbee nor Johnson responded to inquiries regarding the incident. Steve Wetherbee's social media profiles have since been deactivated and Johnson's personal YouTube account saw a hiatus for two years after the incident.

In a video released on January 4, 2023, Johnson discussed repeated abuse she suffered and confirmed her producer at the time was taking advantage of her in the Instagram Live incident. She went on to state she felt trapped in the situation, was lured out of her sobriety by Wetherbee, and went on Instagram Live as a cry for help.

In 2022, Johnson announced she had moved to England to live with her boyfriend, English musician Charlie Hudson. They married in 2023.

Johnson announced that as of March 2023, she was one year sober. As of 2025, she continues to post about her sobriety on her social media pages.

== Filmography ==
List of acting performances in film and television
| Year | Title | Role | Notes |
|---|---|---|---|
| 2008 | No Man's Land | | |
| 2008 | When Weather Changed History | Granddaughter | 1 episode |
| 2009 | Shattered Allegiance | Danielle Rourke (age 10) | Short |
| 2009 | I Do and I Don't | Kim (age 10) | Short |
| 2009 | Tim and Eric Awesome Show, Great Job! | Cheerleader | One episode (credited as Lia Johnson) |
| 2009 | The Unit | Soccer player | 1 episode (uncredited) |
| 2009 | Collide | Little girl | Short |
| 2009 | Cam Gigandet vs. Twilight Fans | Fan #7 | Video short |
| 2010 | The Ryan and Randi Show | Singer | Short |
| 2010 | Shane Dawson TV | Girl watching Degrassi | Episode: "Hot Teens Go Wild On Degrassi: Part 2" |
| 2010–2011 | Kids React | Herself | |
| 2010 | The Station | Bethanny | 1 episode |
| 2010 | Sidewalk Symphony | Female drummer | Short |
| 2010–2011 | OMGtv!! LIVE | Herself | 3 episodes |
| 2011 | Monster in My Swimming Pool | Katie | Short |
| 2011–2014 | Teens React | Herself | |
| 2011 | The Rehearsal | Penny | |
| 2012 | Nerd Wars! | Doris | Short |
| 2012 | Open Your Eyes | | Short |
| 2012 | It's a Criminal World | | Segment: "Shattered Allegiance" |
| 2012 | Teens Wanna Know | Guest | 1 episode |
| 2012 | Finding Cody | Lilli | |
| 2012–2014 | MyMusic | Rayna | 14 episodes |
| 2013 | Counterpunch | Lia | |
| 2013 | Spirits | Kaelyn Farrow | 3 episodes |
| 2013–2014 | AwesomenessTV | Various | |
| 2013-2015 | Side Effects | Susan | |
| 2014 | Expelled | Katie | |
| 2014 | Terry the Tomboy | Terry | Television film (Nickelodeon) |
| 2014 | React to That | Herself | |
| 2014–2015 | YouTubers React | Herself | |
| 2015 | Everything Before Us | Tiff | Wong Fu Productions |
| 2016 | The Thinning | Ellie Harper | YouTube Red Original Movie |
| 2016 | American Wrestler: The Wizard | Kristi Larson | ESX Productions |
| 2016 | Emma's Chance | Meg Bowler | Taylor&Dodge |
| 2016–2018 | T@gged | Hailey Jensen | 24 episodes |
| 2017 | Ruta Madre | Daisy | |
| 2018 | Bayou Caviar | Kat | |
| 2018 | The Thinning: New World Order | Ellie Harper | YouTube Red Original Movie |
| 2022 | Murder at Yellowstone City | Eugenia Martin | |

== Discography ==
=== EPs ===
List of extended plays
| Title | Details |
|---|---|
| Pomegranate | Released: July 19, 2024; Label: Independent; Format: Digital download, streaming |

=== As a lead artist ===
| Title | Year | Peak chart positions | Album |
| Title | Year | US Dance | Album |
|---|---|---|---|
| "Moment Like You" | 2014 | — | Non-album singles |
| "DNA" | 2016 | — | Non-album singles |
| "Cold Heart Killer" | 2017 | — | Non-album singles |
| "The Wave" (with R3HAB) | 2018 | 33 | The Wave |
| "Champagne" | 2018 | — | Non-album singles |
| "Moonflower" | 2019 | — | Non-album singles |
| "Like a God" | 2020 | — | Non-album singles |
| "Lifts" | 2021 | — | TBA |
| "Nectar" | 2021 | — | Pomegranate |
| "Venus Sunrise" | 2021 | — | Pomegranate |
| "Euphoria" | 2021 | — | TBA |
| "Sin" | 2022 | — | TBA |
| "Smoking Gun" | 2023 | — | TBA |
| "Riverbeds" (with Charlie Hudson) | 2023 | — | The Boy III |
| "Chasing Malibu" (with Charlie Hudson) | 2023 | — | The Boy III |
| "Event Horizon" | 2024 | — | Pomegranate |
| "Pink House In Hollywood" | 2024 | — | TBA |
"—" denotes releases that did not chart or were not released in that territory.

=== As a featured artist ===
| Title | Year | Peak chart positions | Album |
| Title | Year | US | Album |
|---|---|---|---|
| "Falling For You" (Norman Doray & Anevo featuring Lia Marie Johnson) | 2016 | — | Non-album single |
| "Polarized" (Alicia Eris featuring Lia Marie Johnson) | 2019 | — | Universoul |
| "Dna" (Heartbrkkidd featuring Lia Marie Johnson) | 2020 | — | Non-album singles |
| "Bang!" (Hues featuring Lia Marie Johnson) | 2020 | — | Non-album singles |
| "Up All Night" (Ryan Bowers featuring Lia Marie Johnson) | 2020 | — | Non-album singles |
| "Work for It" (Ryan Bowers featuring Lia Marie Johnson & Nuthen Nyce) | 2020 | — | Non-album singles |
| "Long Road" (Ryan Bowers featuring Lia Marie Johnson) | 2020 | — | Non-album singles |
| "Dreaming" (Lxmb featuring Lia Marie Johnson, Tay Diddy & Dre Da Kingpen) | 2020 | — | Non-album singles |
| "Right Now" (Ryan Bowers featuring Lia Marie Johnson) | 2020 | — | Running With Scissors |
| "I Need You" (Ryan Bowers featuring Lia Marie Johnson) | 2020 | — | Non-album singles |
| "Find No Love" (Ryan Bowers featuring Lit-One & Lia Marie Johnson) | 2020 | — | Non-album singles |
| "Let Me Breathe" (Ryan Bowers featuring Lia Marie Johnson & Cliff Rich) | 2020 | — | Non-album singles |
| "You" (Charlie Hudson featuring Lia Marie Johnson) | 2021 | — | The Boy I |
| "Been Ready" (Don Lincoln featuring GreatDaeg & Lia Marie Johnson) | 2021 | — | Non-album Singles |
| "Free" (Hues featuring Lia Marie Johnson) | 2021 | — | Non-album Singles |
| "Fallen" (Jayr Gidum featuring Lia Marie Johnson) | 2021 | — | Non-album Singles |
| "Wandering (Don't Go) (Hues featuring Lia Marie Johnson) | 2022 | — | Non-album Singles |
| "Blood" (Charlie Hudson featuring Lia Marie Johnson) | 2023 | — | The Boy III |

=== Other appearances ===
| Title | Year | Other artists | Album |
|---|---|---|---|
| "By The Bank" | 2020 | Ryan Bowers | Running With Scissors |
| "Locked Up" | 2020 | Ryan Bowers | Running With Scissors |
| "I Don't Need You" | 2020 | Ryan Bowers | Running With Scissors |
| "Don't Go Nowhere" | 2020 | Ryan Bowers | Running With Scissors |
| "Withdrawals" | 2020 | Ryan Bowers | Running With Scissors |

=== Music videos ===
| Year | Song | Original Artist(s) |
|---|---|---|
| 2015 | Let's Roll | Trevi Moran |
| 2015 | "Moment Like You" | Herself |
| 2016 | "Youth" | Troye Sivan |
| 2016 | "Go Flex" | Post Malone |
| 2016 | "DNA" | Herself |
| 2017 | "Cold Heart Killer" | Herself |
| 2018 | "The Wave" | R3hab, Herself |
| 2020 | "Up All Night" | Ryan Bowers, Herself |
| 2020 | "Anymore" | Ryan Bowers |
| 2021 | "Lifts" | Herself |
| 2021 | "Nectar" | Herself |
| 2021 | "Venus Sunrise" | Herself |
| 2022 | "Sin" | Herself |
| 2023 | "Smoking Gun" | Herself |
| 2024 | "Event Horizon" | Herself |
| 2024 | "Pink House In Hollywood" | Herself |

== Awards and nominations ==
| Year | Award | Category | Work | Result | Ref |
|---|---|---|---|---|---|
| 2015 | Woodie Awards | Social Climber Woodie | Herself | Nominated | |

== See also ==
- Internet celebrity
- List of YouTubers
- Social impact of YouTube
