= Michael Gallagher (filmmaker) =

American filmmaker (born 1988)

- Born: December 6, 1988 (age 37); San Diego, California, U.S.
- Occupations: Filmmaker; Writer; Producer
- Years active: 2009–present

Michael J. Gallagher (born December 6, 1988) is an American filmmaker. Born and raised in San Diego, California, Gallagher got his start by creating the popular sketch comedy YouTube channel TotallySketch and co-founding Maker Studios. He directed and wrote The Leader about the Heaven's Gate Cult, starring Academy Award Nominee Vera Farmiga, Tim Blake Nelson, and Golden Globe Winner Jim Parsons, which premiered at the 2026 Tribeca Festival and the 2026 Fantasia International Film Festival to positive reviews.

== Early life ==
Gallagher was eight-years-old when 39 members of the Heaven's Gate cult committed suicide in his neighborhood in San Diego, California.

== Career ==
Gallagher founded the popular YouTube sketch comedy channel TotallySketch which quickly garnered over 1.2 Million Subscribers and over 600 Million views. In 2011, Business Insider declared TotallySketch as one of the ten "World's Most Powerful YouTube Stars". Gallagher became one of the original co-founders of Maker Studios, a creator-led studio and the world's first multi-channel network.

In 2014, Gallagher won Legendary's "House of Horrors" short film contest, hand selected by Academy Award Winning Director Guillermo del Toro. That same year, Maker Studios was bought by The Walt Disney Company directly after acquiring Lucasfilm and Marvel Studios.

== Filmography ==
=== Feature films ===
Year	Title	Director	Writer	Producer
2012	Smiley	Yes	Yes	Yes
2016	Internet Famous	Yes	Yes	Yes
2016	The Thinning	Yes	Yes	Yes
2018	The Thinning: New World Order	Yes	Yes	Yes
2019	Funny Story	Yes	Yes	Yes
2026	The Leader	Yes	Yes	Yes

=== Television ===
Year	Title	Director	Writer	Producer	Showrunner	Note
2017	The Real Bros of Simi Valley	Yes	No	Yes	No	Season 1
2022	PBC	Yes	Yes	Yes	Yes	Seasons 1-3
