= Brandon Campbell =

American music composer

- Occupations: music composer for film, TV and video games
- Years active: 2010 - present
- Known for: music contributions to TV series like Game of Thrones and Person of Interest

Brandon Campbell is an American music composer for film, TV and video games and is best known for his music contributions to TV series' like Game of Thrones and Person of Interest and movies such as The Thinning and The Great Wall. After graduating from the University of Rochester he interned at Hans Zimmer's studio, Remote Control Productions and later served as an assistant to Ramin Djawadi. Campbell ventured off on his own in with the film Where Love Found Me, and later that year wrote the music for the thriller The Thinning.

As an additional composer Campbell has written music for TV shows, films and video games like Breakout Kings (2011–2012), Medal of Honor: Warfighter (2012), The House of Magic (2013), Person of Interest (2011–2016), The Strain (2014–2017), Dracula Untold (2014), Warcraft (2016), Gears of War 4 (2016), Prison Break (2005–2017), A Wrinkle in Time (2018), The Ravine (2021) and Eternals (2021). In 2018, Campbell composed the score for the drama-comedy Funny Story. He co-composed the score for the film Slender Man with Ramin Djawadi, created additional music for Gears 5 and co-composed the second episode of Apple TV+'s series Amazing Stories with Djawadi.

Campbell is also composing music for Netflix's The Letter for the King. He also scored music for Pacific Rim: The Black, the anime series based on Pacific Rim and Pacific Rim: Uprising.

Campbell co-composed music for the Amazon Games video game New World and the Square Enix video game The Diofield Chronicle with Djawadi.

Campbell received a Daytime Emmy Award in 2021 for Outstanding Music Direction and Composition for a Daytime Program for Netflix's The Letter for the King.

In 2022, he scored the Josh Duhamel starrer Blackout.

== Credits ==
Year	Film	Notes
2010	Lunch Breaks	
2011-2015	Game of Thrones	TV Series, 50 episodes Additional Music Score by Ramin Djawadi
2011-2016	Person of Interest	TV Series, 95 episodes Additional Music (Season 1-2) Co-composer (Season 3-5)
2013	Storytelles	TV Series, 6 episodes
2013	Unfinished Business	Short
2014	Haunting Ian	
2014	Dracula Untold	
2014	Dracula Untold	Additional Music Score by Ramin Djawadi
2014	The Strain	Additional Music Score by Ramin Djawadi
2014-2017	The Strain	Additional Music Score by Ramin Djawadi
2015	Person of Interest	TV Series, soundtrack
2015	I Hate Myselfie, I Hate Myselfie 2	Composer
2016	The Great Wall	Additional Music Score by Ramin Djawadi
2016	Warcraft	Additional Music Score by Ramin Djawadi
2016	Gears of War 4	Additional Music Score by Ramin Djawadi
2016	Where Love Found Me	
2016	It Gets Worse	
2016	The Thinning	
2016	The Lottery	
2017	Prison Break	TV Series, 3 episodes
2017	Fatal Crossing	
2018	A Wrinkle in Time	Additional Music Score by Ramin Djawadi
2018	Funny Story	
2018	Westworld	TV Series, 5 episodes Additional Music
2018	Slender Man	Co-composed with Ramin Djawadi
2018	The Thinning : New World Order	
2019	Political	
2019	Gears 5	Additional music Score by Ramin Djawadi
2020	Amazing Stories	TV Series, 1 episode Co-composed with Ramin Djawadi
2020	Elephant	Additional Music Score by Ramin Djawadi
2020	The Letter For The King	TV Series, 6 episodes
2021	New World	Video Game
2021	Eternals	Additional Music Score by Ramin Djawadi
2021	Pacific Rim : The Black	TV Series, 14 episodes
2021	The Ravine	Additional Music Score by Ramin Djawadi
2022	Greatness Code	TV Series, 3 episodes
2022	The Diofield Chronicle	Video Game Co-composed with Ramin Djawadi
2022	His Dark Materials	Additional Music for season 3 (8 episodes) Score by Lorne Balfe
2022	Blackout	
2023	Doomsday: Last Survivors	Videogame single written with Trenton
2023	Destination NBA: A G League Odyssey	
2023	Dungeons & Dragons: Honor Among Thieves	Additional Music Score by Lorne Balfe
2023	Life on Our Planet	Additional Music Score by Lorne Balfe
2024	Bad Boys: Ride or Die	Additional Music Score by Lorne Balfe
2024	Beverly Hills Cop: Axel F	Additional Music Score by Lorne Balfe
2024	Fallout	Additional Music (1 episode) Score by Ramin Djawadi
2024	Carry-On	Additional Music Score by Lorne Balfe
