= Tiffany Espensen =

American actress (born 1999)

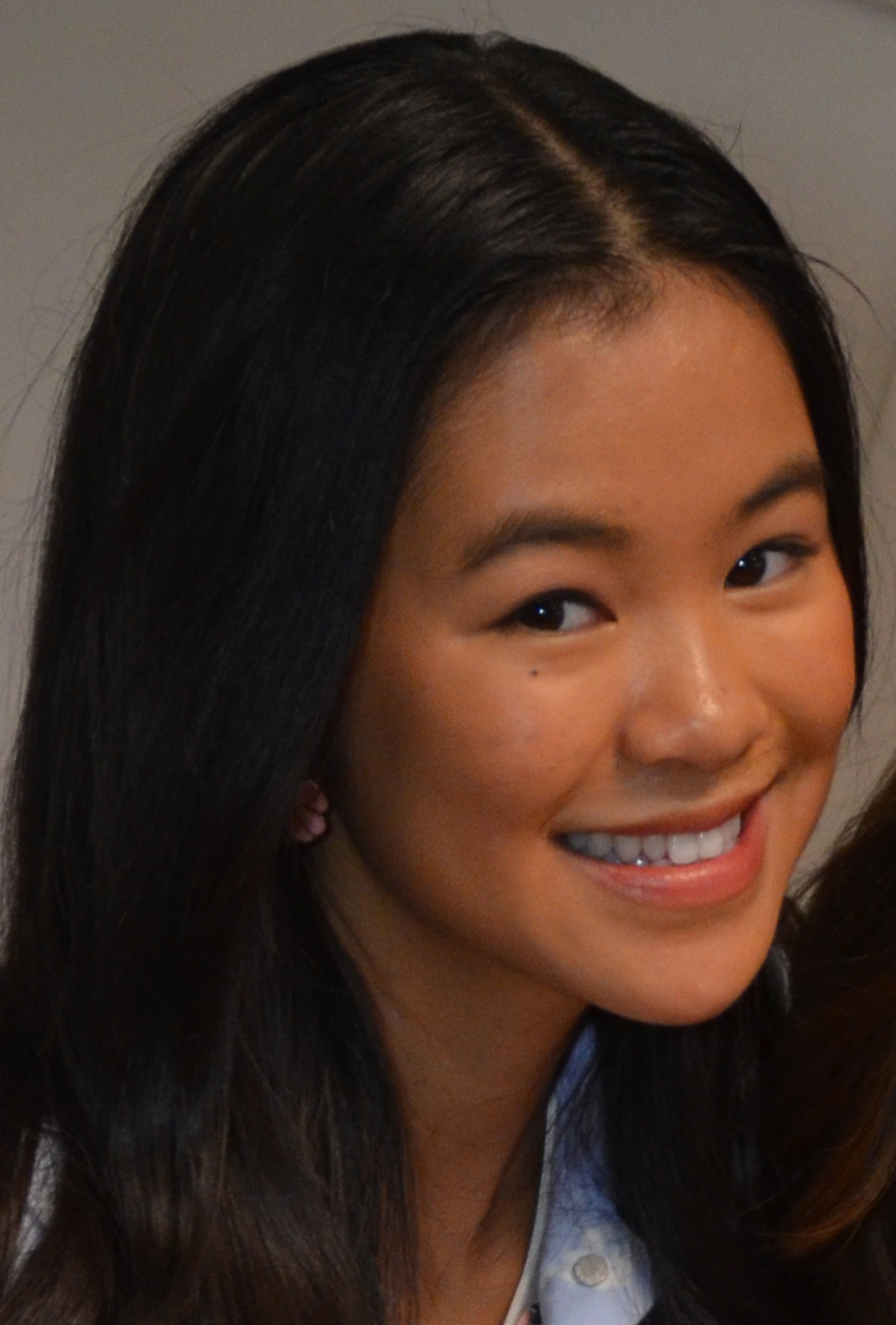
- Espensen in 2014
- Born: February 10, 1999 (age 27); China
- Education: Grand Canyon University
- Occupation: Actress
- Years active: 2007–2021
- Spouse: Lawson Bates (m. 2022)
- Children: 2

Tiffany Espensen (born February 10, 1999) is an American former actress. She began her career as a child actress, before becoming known for her teenaged roles, such as Piper in the 2011 Nickelodeon series Bucket & Skinner's Epic Adventures and Belinda in the 2014 Disney XD series Kirby Buckets. Espensen has also appeared in the Marvel Cinematic Universe films Spider-Man: Homecoming (2017) and Avengers: Infinity War (2018) as Cindy Moon.

== Early life ==
Espensen was born on February 10, 1999, in China, and was adopted by American parents, Robin and Dan Espensen. Espensen attended Liberty University majoring in political science and religion. In November 2021, she completed her master's degree in Christian ministries at Grand Canyon University.

== Career ==
Espensen began her career as a child actress making guest appearances on television series such as Hannah Montana, True Jackson, VP and Zeke and Luther. In 2011, she landed a main role on the Nickelodeon series, Bucket & Skinner's Epic Adventures (2011–2013), in which she played Piper, the little sister of Ashley Argota's character. Espensen followed this up in 2014 with a co-starring role on the Disney XD series Kirby Buckets. In 2016 she was added to the cast of the 2017 feature film Spider-Man: Homecoming, playing the role of Cindy, a role she reprised in the 2018 film Avengers: Infinity War.

== Personal life ==
Espensen started dating country singer and Bringing Up Bates star Lawson Bates in February 2021. In October of that year, Bates and Espensen were engaged at the Tenuta Larnianone in Siena, Italy. They married on May 12, 2022, in San Diego. Their first child, a son, was born on July 19, 2024. Their second son was born on December 9, 2025.

== Filmography ==
Film roles
Year	Title	Role	Notes
2010	Repo Men	Little Alva	
2011	Hop	Alex O'Hare	
2014	Earth to Echo	Charlie	
2015	R.L. Stine's Monsterville: Cabinet of Souls	Nicole	
2017	Spider-Man: Homecoming	Cindy Moon	
2017	Carving a Life	Veronica	
2018	Avengers: Infinity War	Cindy Moon	
2021	Spider-Man: No Way Home	Cindy Moon	Extended cut

Television roles
Year	Show	Role	Notes
2007	Hannah Montana	Samantha	Episode: "Achy Jakey Heart" (Part 1)
2007–2011	Phineas and Ferb	Ginger Hirano	Recurring voice role (seasons 1–2)
2008	Criminal Minds	Samantha	Episode: "Masterpiece"
2008	NCIS	Amanda Lee	Episode: "Dagger"
2009	True Jackson, VP	Young Lulu	Episode: "Back to School"
2009	Zeke and Luther	Innocent Girl	Episode: "Soul Bucket"
2009	Lie to Me	Isabella	Episode: "Tractor Man"
2010	The Boondocks	Ming Long-Dou	Voice role; episode: "The Red Ball"
2011	House	Sophie	Episode: "Two Stories"
2011–2013	Bucket & Skinner's Epic Adventures	Piper	Main role
2013	Good Luck Charlie	Kelly	Episode: "Teddy's Choice"
2014	Terry the Tomboy	Wallaine Rapkin	Nickelodeon Original Movie
2014–2017	Kirby Buckets	Belinda	Main role
2018	Best.Worst.Weekend.Ever.	Chloe	Recurring role
2019	The Lion Guard	Rama / Heng Heng	Voice role; 4 episodes
2019–2020	Alexa & Katie	Jessica	Episodes: "Unconsciously Coupling", "Last Dance"

Video game roles
Year	Title	Role	Notes	Source
2018	Epic Seven	Biblio, Yuna, Rin, Pearlhorizon		
