= The Reason of State =

1589 book by Giovanni Botero

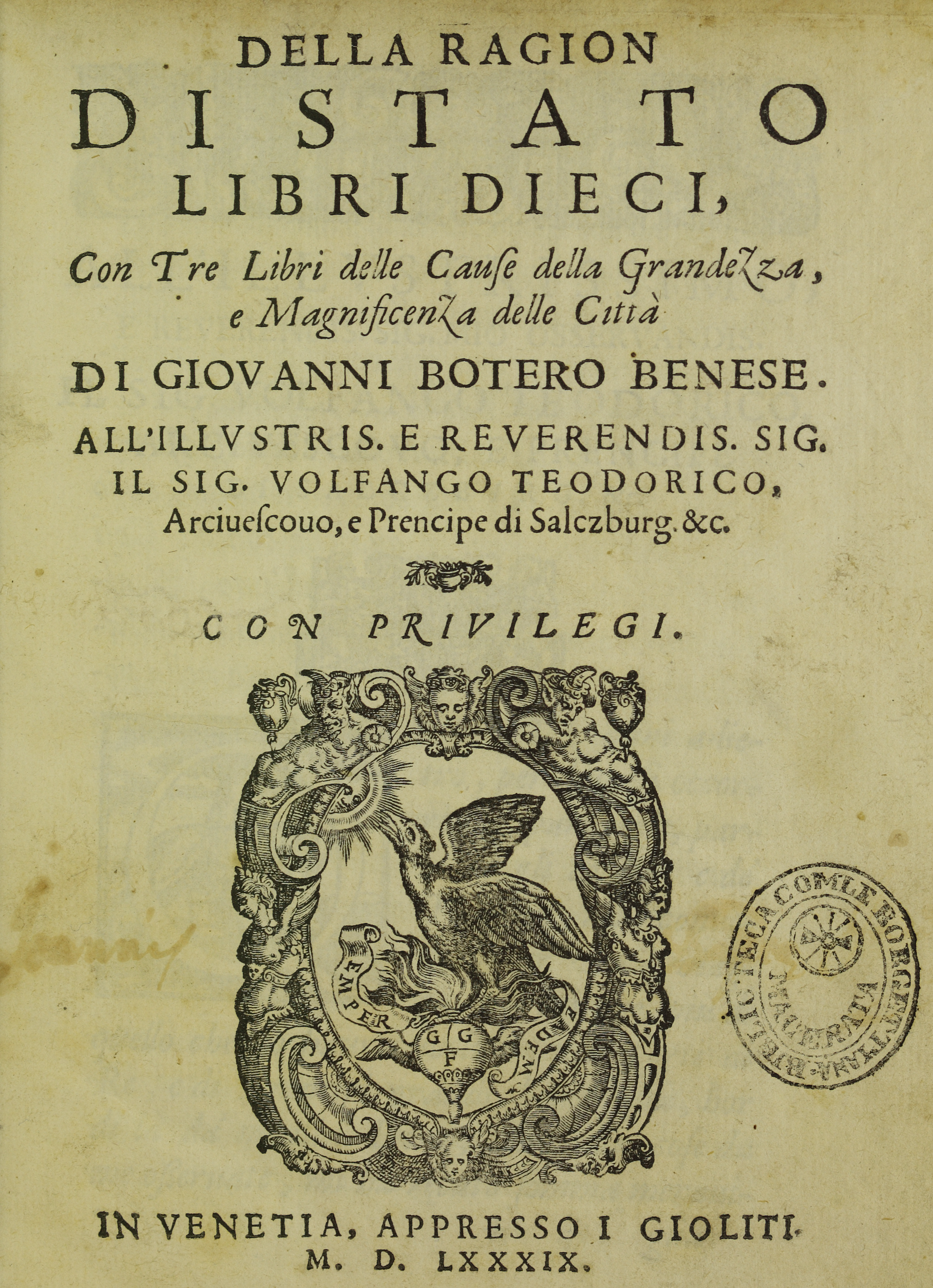
- Title page from the first edition
- Author: Giovanni Botero
- Original title: Della Ragion di Stato
- Language: Italian
- Series: None
- Subject: Political philosophy
- Publisher: Appresso i Gioliti
- Publication date: 1589
- Publication place: Italy
- Media type: Print

The Reason of State (Italian: Della Ragion di Stato) is a work of political philosophy by Italian Jesuit Giovanni Botero published in 1589. The book weighed in on the contemporary debate regarding and first popularized the term "reason of state", which refers to the claimed right of rulers to act contrary to both natural and positive law for the purpose of acquiring, preserving, and augmenting the dominion of the state for the public welfare. This way of thinking about governmental morality emerged at the end of the fifteenth century and remained prevalent until the eighteenth century. Botero supported the political role of the Catholic Church and criticized the immoral statecraft associated with Niccolò Machiavelli.

== Publication ==
Della Ragion di Stato was first published in Venice in 1589 and quickly became a political bestseller, going through 15 Italian editions and translations into Spanish, Latin, and French in the late sixteenth and the seventeenth centuries, as well as the German edition Johannis Boteri Grundlicher Bericht Anordnung guter Polizeien und Regiments of 1596.

Despite its success on the European continent, the book was never published in England. A contemporary English translation by Richard Etherington is in a manuscript in the British Library. This translation is described as an 'Abstract' and Etherington's own response in an 'Adjunct' follows it. There is also a manuscript of a complete translation by William Lawrence of 1659. Botero's treatise has been translated into English by P. J. and D. P. Waley with an introduction by D. P. Waley (London, 1956), and, more recently, by Robert Bireley (Cambridge, 2017).

== Description ==
In the dedication of the 1589 edition of The Reason of State, Botero states his determined opposition to Machiavellianism, to which he traces the corruption of 16th century political discourse.

However, Botero does adopt some aspects of Machiavelli's thought. For instance, in 1590 Botero added a chapter that advocates all European states join the Republic of Venice in a campaign to oust the Ottoman Empire from Europe. This appeal mirrors Machiavelli's own call to drive all foreigners out of Italy at the end of The Prince. Botero also expands upon Machiavelli's idea that men, not money, are more important for preserving a political regime. Where for Machiavelli men are crucial as soldiers, Botero proclaims that both a regime's population and its martial abilities are the most crucial resources at a ruler's disposal.

=== The Reason of State ===
Botero states his intention to bring to light the surreptitious discussions of "reasons of state" common in European courts, which were frequently influenced by Niccolò Machiavelli's political thought. To Machiavelli's instrumental, immoral principles, Botero presents an opposing Christian reason of state, in which statesmen are responsible before God and their conscience. He rejects any reasons of state which consistently transgress God's laws. In stark contrast to Machiavelli, Botero embraces Christianity and the Roman Catholic Church:

The prince must prostrate himself in all humility before the Divine Majesty and acknowledge that from Him proceed the power of a ruler and the obedience of his subjects ... A Christian prince [should not] close the door of his secret council-chamber against Christ and the Gospels and set up a reason of State contrary to God's law, as though it were a rival altar ... So great is the power of religion in government that the state can have no secure foundation without it ... Religion is the mother ... of all the virtues.

— Giovanni Botero, The Reason of State, translated by P.J. Waley and D.P. Waley, New Haven, Yale University Press 1956, p. 63.

=== Botero and religious toleration ===
Botero asserts that piety, religion and the Church (i.e. Roman Catholicism) are indispensable to any valid reasons of state, and he considers the Church to be the foundation of virtuous behavior in both the rulers and the ruled. He perceives Islam and Protestant Christianity as threats both to the Church and to good governance in Europe. Botero believes that a political regime's religious heterogeneity will lead to civil war, as occurred in many European countries of his day. He suggests that Christian rulers promote uniformity of belief by levying special taxes upon religious dissenters and new denominations, and prohibiting them from public speaking and assembly, or bearing arms. He advocates that in extreme cases, Christian rulers should uproot and transport entire populations of religious dissenters, similar to the policies of the contemporary Ottoman Empire against religious minorities and of the ancient Assyrian Empire against Israel.

=== Botero on demography ===
Botero's work ended with a treatise, Delle Cause della Grandezza della Città (On the Causes of the Greatness of Cities). He weighs the causes of the growth of cities along the same lines as Seneca, and anticipates much of the theory of Malthus. He shows that emigration to colonies does not depopulate the mother countries, and he investigates the general circumstances which limit and determine the growth of cities.

=== Botero on the limits of the power of the kings ===
According to Botero, royal power has moral limits. Relying on Aquinas and the School of Salamanca, he maintains that the people entrust their king with certain powers to ensure the common defense and prosperity: "A people must bestow upon their ruler such powers as are necessary for him maintain laws among them and defend them against the violence of their enemies." The king, for his part, must not exceed these given powers, and "must not oppress his subjects with new taxes disproportionate to their means nor permit greedy ministers to increase the amount of ordinary taxation or to extort it by cruel methods." Echoing early Jesuit monarchomach arguments, Botero maintains that "when a people is burdened beyond its resources, either they leave the country or turn against the ruler or go over to an enemy power."

== Bibliography ==
- Pozzi, Luigi (1881). La "Ragion di Stato" e le "Relazioni universali" di Giovanni Botero. Casale: tip. Bertero.
- Levi, Mario Attilio (1927). "Della Ragion di Stato di Giovanni Botero". Annali dell'Istituto Superiore di Magistero del Piemonte. I: 1–21.
- Bireley, Robert (1990). The Counter-Reformation Prince: Anti-Machiavellianism or Catholic Statecraft in Early Modern Europe.
- De Mattei, Rodolfo (1941). "Critiche secentesche alla "Ragion di Stato" del Botero". Studi di storia e diritto in onore di A. Solmi. II. Milan: Giuffrè: 325–342.
- De Mattei, Rodolfo (1943). "Origini e fortuna della locuzione "ragion di Stato"". Studi in memoria di F. Ferrara. I. Milan: Giuffrè: 177–192.
- Fischer, Emil A. (1952). Giovanni Botero ein politischer und volkswirtschaftlicher Denker der Gegenreformation. Langnau (Bern): Emmenthaler-Blatt.
- Federico Chabod, Giovanni Botero (1934), ora in Id., Scritti sul Rinascimento, Torino 1967, pp. 271–458 (da segnalare la preziosa appendice con l'esemplare analisi delle fonti delle Relazioni universali).
- Meinecke, Friedrich (1924). Die Idee der Staatsräson, in der neueren Geschichte [The Idea of Reason of State in Modern History]. München-Berlin: Druck und Verlag von R. Oldenbourg. pp. 81–112.
- Firpo, Luigi (1975). "La "Ragion di Stato" di Giovanni Botero: redazione, rifacimenti, fortuna". In Gianrenzo P. Clivio; Riccardo Massano (eds.). Civiltà del Piemonte. Studi in onore di Renzo Gandolfo nel suo settantacinquesimo compleanno. Turin: Centro Studi Piemontesi. pp. 139–64.
- Botero e la "Ragion di Stato", Atti del Convegno in memoria di Luigi Firpo, Torino (8-10 marzo 1990), a cura di Artemio Enzo Baldini, Firenze 1992 (in partic. A. Tenenti, Dalla "Ragion di Stato" di Machiavelli a quella di Botero, pp. 11–21; K.C. Schellhase, Botero, reason of State, and Tacitus, pp. 243–58; M. Stolleis, Zur Rezeption von Giovanni Botero in Deutschland, pp. 405–16).
- Descendre, Romain (2003). "Raison d'État, puissance et économie. Le mercantilisme de Giovanni Botero". Revue de Métaphysique et de Morale (in French) (3): 311–321. doi:10.3917/rmm.033.0311. JSTOR 40903952.
- Descendre, Romain (2009). L'état du monde. Giovanni Botero entre raison d'état et géopolitique (in French). Genève: Droz Librairie. ISBN 978-2600011907.
- Catteeuw, Laurie (2013). Censures et raisons d'État. Une histoire de la modernité politique (XVIe-XVIIe siècle) (in French). Paris: Éditions Albin Michel. ISBN 9782226209146.
