= Michael Traynor (actor) =

American actor and dancer (born 1975)

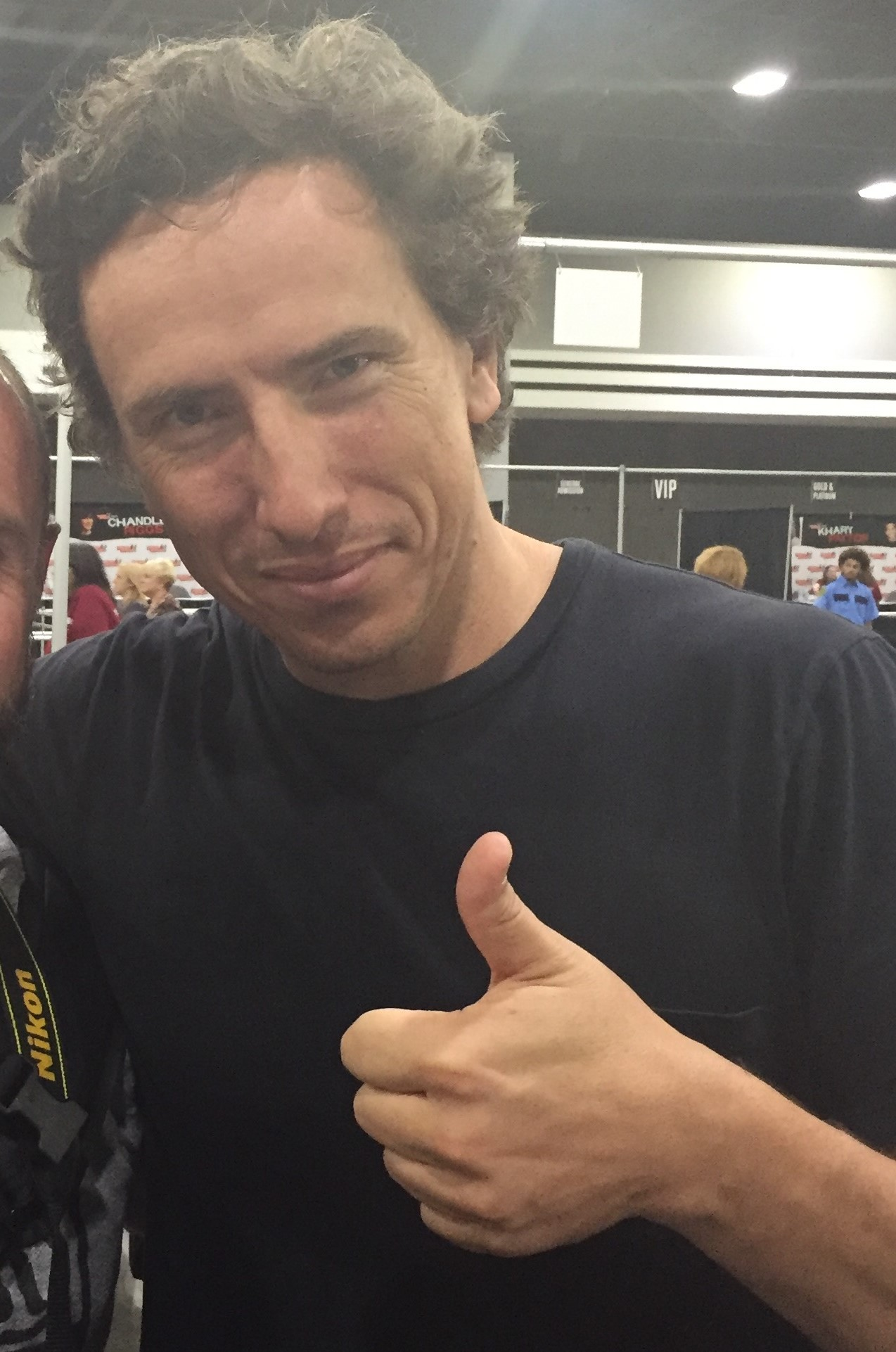
- Born: December 12, 1975 (age 50); Fort Lauderdale, Florida, U.S.
- Occupations: Actor, dancer
- Years active: 2002–present
- Partner: Brooke Nevin (2005–present)
- Children: 1

Michael Traynor (born December 12, 1975) is an American actor and dancer known for his roles on The Walking Dead, Rectify and The Fosters.

== Career ==
Traynor began his career as a dancer, receiving dance scholarships and dancing professionally for a few years, but after performing in a few small acting roles he decided to become an actor. His most notable roles are Nicholas on The Walking Dead, George Melton on Rectify and Craig on The Fosters.

== Personal life ==
Since 2005, Traynor has been in a relationship with Canadian actress Brooke Nevin. In late April 2024, the couple welcomed their first child, a son.

== Filmography ==
=== Film ===
Year	Film	Role	Notes
2018	Juke Box Hero	Randall	
2018	The Thinning: New World Order	Mason King	Web Film
2017	Needlestick	Everett Barnard	
2017	Mope	Doug	
2016	The Thinning	Mason King	Web Film
2016	Ascension (VII)	Jason	
2016	Out West	Billy Hanson	
2015	Zelos	David	Short film
2013	Homefront	Junior DEA Agent	
2013	The Expressionless	Doctor	Short film
2012	Smiley	Smiley	
2012	Open House	George	Short film
2011	Painting in the Rain	Walter Derner III	
2011	This Is Not an Umbrella	The Red Man	Short film
2010	Per/Versions	Ethan	
2009	Tales from the Catholic Church of Elvis!	Timmy	
2009	A Perfect Getaway	Groomsman #1	
2008	A Necessary Death	Michael	
2007	Don't Advertise	Trent Foxe	Short film
2005	Cabin 6	Park Attendant	
2003	Cry Funny Happy	Wes	

=== Television ===
Year	TV Show	Role	Notes
2022–2024	Good Trouble	—N/a	Director: "Mama Told Me" and "You Can't Always Get What You Want".
2014–2016	The Fosters	Craig	7 Episodes
2016	Rosewood	Walter	Episode: Sudden Death & Shades Deep
2015	The Walking Dead	Nicholas	7 Episodes
2013–2014	Rectify	George Melton	5 Episodes
2013	BlackBoxTV	Weslyn	Episode: Girls on Ice
2012	Underwater	Len	Episode: You Got Perspective?
2012	Make It or Break It		Episode: Listen to the Universe
2010	Trading Eights	Fast Eddie Adams	Episode: Take Five
2008	Imaginary Bitches	Waiter Guy	2 Episodes
2002	NYPD Blue	Carjacker	Episode: You've Got Mail
