= The Thinning =

2016 film by Michael Gallagher

- Promotional poster
- Directed by: Michael Gallagher
- Written by: Michael Gallagher; Steve Greene
- Produced by: Michael Gallagher; Jana Winternitz; Michael Wormser
- Starring: Logan Paul; Peyton List; Lia Marie Johnson; Calum Worthy; Matthew Glave; Michael Traynor; Stacey Dash
- Cinematography: Greg Cotten
- Edited by: Brian Ufberg
- Music by: Brandon Campbell
- Production companies: Legendary Digital Media; Cinemand; Kids at Play
- Distributed by: YouTube Red
- Release date: October 12, 2016
- Running time: 83 minutes
- Country: United States
- Language: English

The Thinning is a 2016 American social science fiction thriller film directed by Michael Gallagher and starring Logan Paul, Peyton List, Lia Marie Johnson, Calum Worthy, Matthew Glave, Michael Traynor, and Stacey Dash. The film is set in a dystopian future in which population control is enforced through a school aptitude test; those who fail it are executed.

== Plot ==
In 2039, due to Earth's human overpopulation, the United Nations instructs all nations to annually cut their populations by 5%. The United States implements the 10-241 or "the Thinning", a standardized test in which those who fail will be executed.

Blake Redding, son of Texas governor Dean Redding, is dating a girl named Ellie Harper, neither of whom study for the exam. Blake passes the exams, while Ellie fails. Blake calls his father in an attempt to free Ellie, but he refuses.

On the day of his last exam a year later, Blake makes a video saying that he will purposefully fail his exam to test his father's loyalty. Redding takes notice of this announcement, and test manager Mason King, also head of the Department of Population Control, is ordered to pass Blake regardless of his score. Mason switches his score with genius classmate Laina Michaels, passing Blake at her expense. Suspicious, a teacher named Ms. Birch secretly hands Laina a keycard so she can unlock the doors and escape. Blake cuts the school's power, allowing Laina to escape. That, however, is hindered by the school initiating lockdown. After using the keycard, Laina meets up with Blake.

After a series of escapades with the guards, Laina goes to the server room to check the scores, learning that test scores are shuffled, resulting in the wrongful deaths of many students with passing scores. Laina gives it to her friend Kellan, who is acquainted with a news anchor. The power is turned on, and Laina is caught on camera, thus taken to the Thinning. Blake, still in the disguise, attempts to release all the failed students, but is caught by the guards. After photos of the system's misconduct are leaked, Redding reluctantly executes all of those who actually failed, including Blake, by injection. As the lockdown ends, Laina is reunited with her younger sister Corrine as well as Ms. Birch, who has been taking care of Corrine since their mother's death.

Blake and the rest are taken underground, where many people are working for tech company Assuru Global. As Blake slowly wakes up from what was actually a sleep drug, he sees a blonde girl working: Ellie.

== Cast ==
- Logan Paul as Blake Redding
- Peyton List as Laina Michaels
- Lia Marie Johnson as Ellie Harper
- Calum Worthy as Kellan Woods
- Ryan Newman as Sarah Foster
- Michael Traynor as Mason King
- Stacey Dash as Kendra Birch
- Matthew Glave as Governor Dean Redding
- Robert Gant as Vince Davi
- Kiersten Warren as Barbara Michaels
- Jana Winternitz as Ms. Cole
- Patrick O’Sullivan as Mr. P. Glass
- Amy Paffrath as Wendy Banks
- Jeff Corbett as Victor Woods
- Laura Harring as Georgina Preston
- Aria Leabu as Corrine Michaels
- Marcel Nahapetian as Joey Michaels

== Reception ==
Adi Robertson of The Verge gave a negative review of the film, describing it, in comparison to other films about teenagers forced into a deadly competition, as "remarkable simply for being such a bad take on the formula."

== Sequel ==
On November 17, 2017, Logan Paul announced on his YouTube channel that a sequel, titled The Thinning: New World Order was starting production.

On January 10, 2018, YouTube announced that production of New World Order was put on hold, as part of repercussions instated upon Paul for posting a controversial video in which he visited Aokigahara, a Japanese forest known for being a common place for suicides to occur, and filmed a dead body. This sparked outrage across social media against Paul, forcing an apology from himself and repercussions from YouTube, including delaying The Thinning: New World Order and his appearance in the upcoming season of YouTube Red series Foursome, but the criticism still continues.

On October 16, 2018, Logan Paul released the trailer for The Thinning: New World Order. On October 17, Paul premiered The Thinning: New World Order to the public.
