= Giovanni Botero =

Italian scholar and Catholic priest

The Reverend Giovanni Botero
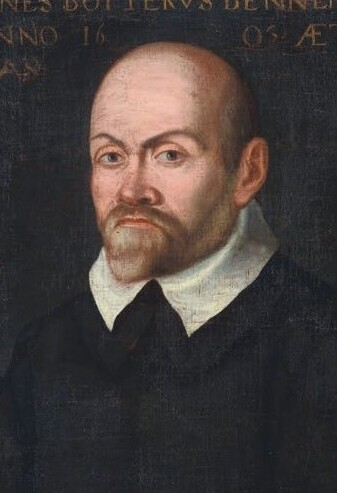
- Portrait of Giovanni Botero, 1605
- Born: 1544; Bene Vagienna, Savoyard state
- Died: 23 June 1617 (aged 72–73); Turin, Savoyard state
- Resting place: Chiesa dei Santi Martiri

Education
- Education: Roman College; University of Padua

Philosophical work
- Era: Baroque philosophy
- Region: Western philosophy; Italian philosophy
- School: Counter-Reformation
- Main interests: Political philosophy
- Notable works: The Reason of State
- Notable ideas: Reason of state National interest

Giovanni Botero (c. 1544 – 23 June 1617) was an Italian thinker, Catholic priest, poet, and diplomat, author of Della Ragion di Stato (The Reason of State), in ten chapters, printed in Venice in 1589, and of Universal Relations, (Rome, 1591), addressing the world geography and ethnography. With his emphasis that the wealth of cities was caused by adding value to raw materials, Botero may be considered the ancestor of both Mercantilism and Cameralism.

== Early life ==
Born around 1544 in Bene Vagienna, in the northern Italian principality of Piedmont, Botero was sent to the Jesuit college in Palermo at the age of 15. A year later, he moved to the Roman College, he was introduced to the teaching of some of the most influential Catholic thinkers of the sixteenth century, including Juan de Mariana, who, in his On the King and the Education of the King, would argue for the popular overthrow of tyrannical rulers.

In 1565, Botero was sent to teach philosophy and rhetoric at the Jesuit colleges in France, first in Billom, and then in Paris. The second half of the sixteenth century saw the kingdom dramatically, and often violently divided by the French Wars of Religion. Paris especially was heating up during Botero's stay there from 1567 to 1569, and he was recalled to Italy after getting too caught up in the excitement, apparently for his involvement in an anti-Spanish protest.

Botero spent the 1570s drifting from one Jesuit college to another, Milan, Padua, Genoa, and then back in Milan. After a doctrinally incorrect sermon he gave questioning the Pope's temporal power, he was discharged from the Jesuit order in 1580.

== Secretary and diplomat ==
Botero's life took a major turn at this time when he was commissioned by Bishop Carlo Borromeo of Milan as a personal assistant. Borromeo introduced Botero to the practical side of Church administration, often socializing with the nobility of northern Italy, most notably Charles Emmanuel I, Duke of Savoy. When the Bishop died in 1584, Botero continued his service to the family as assistant to Carlo Borromeo's nephew, Federico.

Before his work with Federico began, however, Botero took part in a diplomatic mission to France on behalf of Charles Emmanuel. For most of 1585, Botero was in Paris, discussing affairs of the day, and perhaps overhearing the conspiratorial debate on whether the pope would grant licence for the French Duke of Guise, assisted by the Charles Emmanuel I of Savoy and Philip II of Spain, to kill the French King, so they could then launch a massive offensive against the French and Swiss Calvinists. The license was never granted, and the offensive was postponed and made more modest, but this conspiracy tells of what kind of political debate was being had, and just what kind of trouble there was in 1580s France.

== Works and thought ==
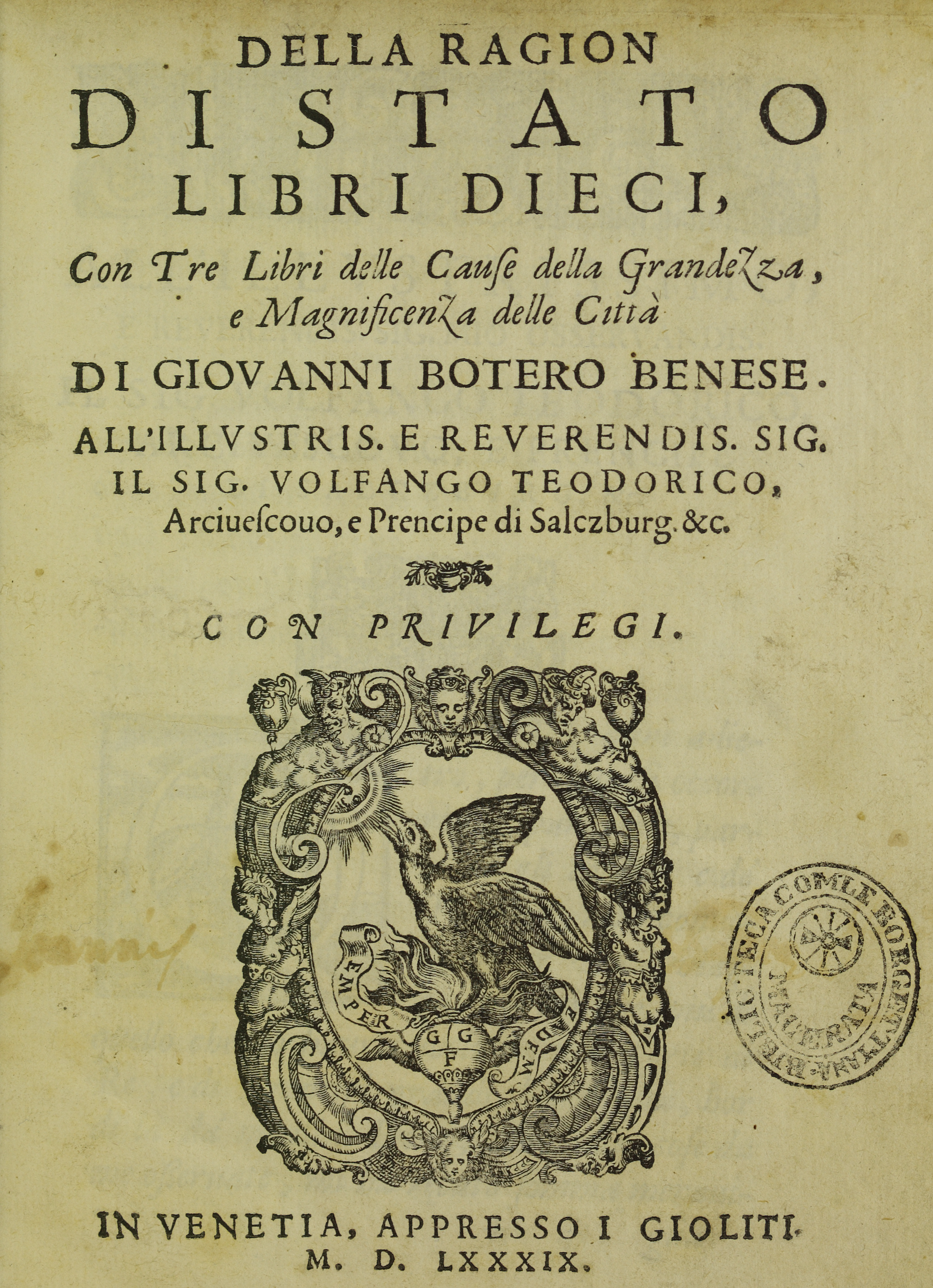
Della ragion di stato, 1589

By the late 1580s, Botero had already published a few works, most notably an epic-style poem dedicated to Henry III of France in 1573 and a Latin commentary on Hebrew Scriptures titled On Kingly Wisdom in 1583, but his most important works were yet to come. In 1588, Botero first published his Delle cause della grandezza delle città (On the Causes of the Greatness of Cities). Foreshadowing the work of Thomas Malthus, here Botero outlines the generative and nutritive virtues of a city, the former being the rate of human reproduction, and the latter being the ability of the products of the city and its countryside to maintain the people. Cities grow when their nutritive virtue is greater than the generative, but at the inevitable point when these virtues are inverted, the city begins to die.

In 1589, Botero completed his most famous work, Della ragion di Stato (The Reason of State). In this work, Botero argues that a prince's power must be based on some form of consent of his subjects, and princes must make every effort to win the people's affection and admiration. This differed from Machiavelli's philosophy in that it is not sufficient to seem like a just prince, for one's true nature will always shine through; one must actually be a just prince by the advice Botero lays out.

Botero's idea of justness came from his exposure to Thomist thought and natural law circulating the Jesuit college system, which had been greatly influenced by the work of Dominican theologians Francisco de Vitoria and Domingo de Soto of the School of Salamanca. Thomas Aquinas had argued that God infused each individual with certain natural rights, and by the use of reason, human beings could come together to create just societies. Politically, Aquinas imagined that the people would decide on a suitable king, and invest him with certain powers to protect them and allow their prosperity. If the king turned tyrant, Aquinas argued, the people were within their natural rights to depose him. This was in direct opposition to the ideas on the God-given absolute sovereignty of kings that were being proffered by Protestant theologians in the early sixteenth century, and by political thinkers like the French jurist Jean Bodin at the end of the century.

Jean Bodin's influential Six Books of the Republic was an important influence on Botero's writing of the Reason of State, even if, as with Machiavelli's Prince, much of that influence was negative. While Botero disagrees with Bodin's thought on sovereignty, preferring something more popularly based, he does agree with some of Bodin's economic ideas. Nonetheless, Botero's overall conception of political economy is again more 'liberal' than that of Bodin, who argued for active participation by kings in the economy of the country, including mercantilist policies that would be enacted wholeheartedly in early modern France by Louis XIV and Colbert. Bodin cautioned kings only against trading with their own subjects; all other economic activity was allowed. Botero, on the other hand, argued that there were only three cases where the prince could take part in trade: 1) if no private citizen could afford it, 2) if a single private citizen would grow too powerful by the profits of it, or 3) there were some shortfall in supply whereby the prince would have to aid in the distribution of goods. Ultimately, Botero argued that economic activity was unbecoming a prince, and that the people were to be the prime economic mover in the state.

Murray Rothbard argued that the differences between Machiavelli's and Botero's formulations of the reason of state were only nominally different, describing Botero's criticism of Machiavelli as 'merely a ritualistic cover for Botero's adoption of the essence of Machiavellian thought.'

== Later works, life, and influence ==
Through the 1590s, Botero continued in the employ of Federico Borromeo, who would become Archbishop of Milan in 1595. Botero mixed in the high society of Rome and Milan in these years, and published another work for which he was to become quite well known, the Relazioni Universali. Released in four volumes between 1591 and 1598 (a fifth volume was finally published in the late nineteenth century), the 'relations' of the title referred to those of the 'universal' (Catholic) church in various parts of the world, a treatise on "The Strength of all the Powers of Europe and Asia", and even includes the Americas. The work marks the beginning of demographic studies.

Finishing his employment with Federico Borromeo in 1599, Botero returned to the House of Savoy, to be tutor to three sons of Charles Emmanuel. He would tour Spain with his three charges from 1603 to 1607, no doubt associating with the closest of Philip III's advisors, from whom his ideas would be passed on to Philip IV's most trusted policy-maker, the Count-Duke of Olivares.

Here is where Botero's work began to have an influence. Olivares seems to have used Botero's Reason of State to outline the strategy for preserving the Spanish Empire in his famous Memorial on the Union of Arms. There is also evidence that Duke Maximilian of Bavaria, one of the staunchest political supporters of Catholic reform and a leading figure of the Thirty Years' War, had discussed the Reason of State with his advisors. Thus, Botero's thought was able to shape at least some of the policies among the European states of the very troubled seventeenth century.

Botero's work would also influence the next generation of political and economic thinkers. Thomas Mun's liberal mercantilist treatise England's Treasure by Foreign Trade, written in 1624, but not published until 1664, owes something to the Reason of State, and there is evidence that the great Belgian thinker Justus Lipsius read the Reason of State.

Botero died in Turin in 1617.

== Memorials ==
In the 18th century, in his honour, a monument was built in Bene Vagienna in the so-called Piazza Botero, a central square located in front of the Church of Santa Maria Assunta (Chiesa di Santa Maria Assunta) and surrounded by historic buildings, such as the town hall Comune di Bene Vagienna.

Likewise, in honour of Botero, streets bearing his name were built in the cities of Turin, Rome and Rimini, in Italy.
