= The Hathaways =

The Hathaways may refer to:

- The Hathaways (TV series), a 1961–1962 American sitcom
- Hathaways (novel series), a historical romance novel series by Lisa Kleypas

== See also ==
- The Haunted Hathaways, a 2013–2015 American television sitcom
