= The Haunted Thundermans =

"The Haunted Thundermans" is a 2014 television episode common to both The Thundermans and The Haunted Hathaways:

- "The Haunted Thundermans" (The Thundermans episode), episode 25
- "The Haunted Thundermans" (The Haunted Hathaways episode), episode 35
