= Wallflower (disambiguation) =

Wallflower or Erysimum is a genus of flowering plants.

Wallflower may also refer to:

- Wallflower (person), a term for a shy person

== Films ==
- Wallflower (film), a 1948 American comedy film
- Wallflowers (film), a 1928 American drama film
- The Wall Flower, a 1922 American drama film written and directed by Rupert Hughes

== Music ==
=== Groups ===
- The Wallflowers (British band), a British indie/new wave band formed in 1985
- The Wallflowers, an American rock band formed in 1989
- Wallflower (band), an English rock band formed in 2014

=== Albums ===
- Wallflower (Diana Krall album), 2014
- Wallflower (My Sister's Machine album), 1993
- The Wallflowers (album), by the American band The Wallflowers, 1992
- Wallflower, an album by Jordan Rakei, 2017
- Wallflowers (album), by Jinjer, 2021

=== Songs ===
- "Wallflower" (Bob Dylan song), 1971
- "Wallflower", by Twice from Ready to Be, 2023
- "Wallflower", by Peter Gabriel from Peter Gabriel, 1982
- "The Wallflower (Dance with Me, Henry)", by Etta James, 1955
- "Wallflower", by Goldfinger from Never Look Back, 2020

== Other uses in arts, entertainment, and media ==
- Wallflower (comics), a fictional character in the Marvel Comics universe
- "Wallflower" (Fringe), an episode of Fringe
- Wallflowers (short story collection), a collection of short stories by Eliza Robertson
- Wallflowers (web series), an American comedy web series
- The Wallflower (manga), a 2000 Japanese comic by Tomoko Hayakawa, and anime and live-action adaptations
- Wallflowers (novel series), a series of five fictional historical romance novels by Lisa Kleypas
