= List of The Haunted Hathaways episodes =

The Haunted Hathaways is an American sitcom that premiered on Nickelodeon on July 13, 2013. The first season was originally planned to have 20 episodes but was picked up to 26 episodes on August 21, 2013. Season 2 was the final season as no new episodes were confirmed at the 2015/16 upfront.

As of March 5, 2015, The Haunted Hathaways has aired 47 episodes over two seasons.

== Series overview ==
Season	Episodes	Originally released	
Season	Episodes	First released	Last released
1	26	July 13, 2013	May 31, 2014
2	21	June 28, 2014	March 5, 2015

== Episodes ==
=== Season 1 (2013–14) ===
No. overall	No. in season	Title	Directed by	Written by	Original release date	Prod. code	U.S. viewers (millions)
1	1	"Pilot"	Bruce Leddy	Robert Peacock	July 13, 2013	101	3.35
Michelle Hathaway and her two daughters, Taylor and Frankie, move to New Orleans and discover that their new house is already occupied by a ghost family composed of dad, Ray Preston, and his sons, Miles and Louie. The Hathaways tell them to leave (especially Taylor) but when Ray refuses and brings a snow storm to the house, Michelle calls in a ghost exterminator to get rid of the ghosts. Ray and Louie think it's fake only to realize their powers have been removed. Meanwhile, Miles helps get Taylor on the gymnastics team. They become friends just as Miles is brought to the family room. The ghosts start disappearing but, Taylor and Frankie don't want them to go. As Ray, Louie and Miles are disappearing Michelle is convinced by her daughters, the ghosts aren't that bad. The exterminator is told to stop the spell but it doesn't work. Worried about Miles, Taylor smashes the orb generating the magic and saves the ghosts. They then decide to live together.
2	2	"Haunted Sleepover"	Roger Christiansen	Ray Lancon	July 20, 2013	102	2.79
As the newest member of her school gymnastics team, Taylor's worried to find out she's responsible for hosting a team sleepover but Ray promises that Miles and Louie will be on their best behavior. Unfortunately, Frankie and Louie team up to scare Taylor and her friends out of the house.
3	3	"Haunted Science Fair"	Roger Christiansen	Bob Smiley	July 27, 2013	103	2.11
Taylor assures her gymnastics team she can win the top cash prize at the science fair so they can buy new uniforms, assuming Miles will help with his ghost powers. However, Michelle forbids Taylor from using Miles' short cuts, leaving Taylor to create the project herself. Michelle gets into bigger trouble when she tries to improve Taylor’s project and breaks it, and must rely on Louie’s erratic ghost powers to fix the problem. Meanwhile, Frankie joins Ray and Louie during their bonding time (scaring random people). When Frankie scares a guy Louie couldn't and gets along with Ray better than Louie ever did Louie gets jealous. But later, Frankie makes it up to him by convincing Ray, a mistake with Taylor's project that Louie caused sound like the best scare ever.
4	4	"Haunted Kids"	Shannon Flynn	Maiya Williams	August 3, 2013	105	2.40
An argument between Ray and Michelle causes them to each think they're the better parent so they decide to switch roles. Lo and behold, Michelle is unable to wrangle the boys and Ray is completely thrown by the intricacies of girl social antics.
5	5	"Haunted Volleyball"	Roger Christiansen	Boyce Bugliari & Jamie McLaughlin	August 10, 2013	104	2.34
Ray gives Frankie a one-time boost to help with her volleyball skills. Miles becomes friends with a human named James, who has the ability to see ghosts.
6	6	"Haunted Babysitter"	Eric Dean Seaton	Mike Dieffenbach	September 14, 2013	108	1.90
Miles babysits a prankful duo, Frankie and Louie, but it results in chaos. Meanwhile, Ray tries to help Taylor get prepared for a ballroom dancing competition with a hot guy. Once she is prepared for the dancing competition, she finds out that the hot guy ditched her for another girl.
7	7	"Haunted Doll"	Shannon Flynn	Jonathan Butler & Gabriel Garza	September 21, 2013	106	2.07
The Hathaway/Preston Yard Sale is the first official “family” activity and everyone is on board until Louie fumbles his attempt at possessing one of the stuffed animals, landing himself in Taylor’s favorite nurse doll. When the doll, with Louie inside, gets sold to a doll collector the kids must all work together to get him back home safely.
8	8	"Haunted Dog"	Eric Dean Seaton	Heather Wordham	September 28, 2013	107	2.40
It’s Taylor’s birthday and Miles is excited about getting his “new” sister a special gift – a ghost dog named Wags. But when Wags turns out to be a less than a perfect pet, Miles tries to cover it up but gets caught.
9	9	"Haunted Play"	Roger Christiansen	Ray Lancon	October 5, 2013	111	1.62
Frankie fakes an injury to avoid a play that Michelle is directing at her school.
10	10	"Haunted Interview"	Trevor Kirschner	Bob Smiley	October 12, 2013	112	1.71
Louie gets mad when Frankie writes an essay for a prestigious private school that says he is a horrible ghost and he tries to sabotage the interview for the school. Meanwhile Taylor wants Miles to start to respect boundaries.
11	11	"Haunted Halloween"	Roger Christiansen	Boyce Bugliari & Jamie McLaughin	October 19, 2013	116	2.56
Ray and Miles agree to help Taylor with her first Halloween party in the house. When Louie has summoned a ghost to scare everyone, the ghost has the power to wreak havoc at the party. Guest star: Brittany Ross as Glenda
12	12	"Haunted Principal"	Roger Christiansen	Boyce Burgliari & Jamie McLaughin	November 2, 2013	114	2.40
Taylor and Frankie suspect that Michelle is dating their school principal. Meanwhile, Ray has attempted to fix an oven in the kitchen.
13	13	"Haunted Cookie Jar"	Shannon Flynn	Blake J. Williger	November 9, 2013	115	1.83
Miles and Frankie break Michelle's new cookie jar. They jump through hoops to cover up so Michelle would not find out. They try fixing it and buying a new one but without success. It is revealed that Michelle hates the cookie jar because everyone assumes that because she owns a bakery a cookie jar would be perfect for her. Meanwhile, Louie's friend, Teddy gets a crush on Taylor when he comes to the Hathaway-Preston house for a play date with Louie.
14	14	"Haunted Camping"	Trevor Kirschner	Heather Wordham	November 16, 2013	117	1.98
Everyone plans to camping, but Louie and Frankie must stay home after misbehaving. Louie and Ray switch bodies and Louie runs off to go camping, with Frankie and Ray staying home with a mean babysitter.
15	15	"Haunted Boat"	Trevor Kirschner	Jonathan Butler	November 23, 2013	120	2.55
Taylor's friend, Blair (Ciara Bravo) is coming to the house and wants Taylor to see a midnight movie with her. She tricks Ray into letting her go and Michelle and Ray get their revenge. Meanwhile, Miles helps Frankie on a model river boat project making Louie feel left out and Ray trains Michelle for a marathon.
16	16	"Haunted Bakery"	Bruce Leddy	Robert Peacock	November 30, 2013	109	1.93
The children must work together to retrieve Michelle's secret recipe book after it is stolen by a rival bakery.
17	17	"Haunted Brothers"	Roger Christiansen	Boyce Bugliari & Jamie McLaughlin	January 4, 2014	118	2.41
The Great Frankini accidentally hypnotizes Miles to become a bad ghost instead of her intended target, Louie. Frankie must find a way to break the spell before Miles destroys Taylor's school talent show performance.
18	18	"Haunted Prank"	Shannon Flynn	Maiya Williams	January 11, 2014	113	2.73
After Louie and Frankie go too far with one of their pranks, Michelle and Ray separate them. But later on, the two are very miserable so Michelle and Ray try to get the duo back together. Meanwhile, Miles thinks Taylor is hiding something and tries to figure out what it is.
19	19	"Haunted Crushing"	Bruce Leddy	Boyce Bugliari & Jamie McLaughlin	February 8, 2014	110	2.56
Taylor gets a famous singer, Skyler Makepeace, to perform for the school's fundraiser, but that means Frankie and Taylor cannot do their tradition of "Crazy Cake Day". So, Frankie sabotages Taylor's interview with him. After realizing how much it meant to Taylor, she and Louie try to get him back. Meanwhile, when Miles has a crush on a ghost girl named Wendy, Ray wants to give Miles his "fatherly advice", but Michelle goes too far in trying to get them together.
20	20	"Haunted Visitor"	Shannon Flynn	Mike Dieffenbach	February 15, 2014	119	1.84
Ray's dad drops by the house to spend time with the Prestons, but Ray is worried because the Hathaways are living in the house and he kept them a secret from his dad.
21	21	"Haunted Secret Agent"	Trevor Kirschner	Boyce Bugliari & Jamie McLaughlin	March 22, 2014	121	1.81
Louie lies to his ghost friends about Ray's job; he says Ray's a secret agent but the truth comes out on Career Day. Meanwhile, Michelle, Taylor, and Frankie meet Clay Bannister, the food critic from Pilot, and try to make it up to him by convincing his mother he's not crazy for believing in ghosts. Guest Star: Fred Stoller as Mr. Dobson
22	22	"Haunted Bowling Alley"	Eric Dean Seaton	Maiya Williams	April 12, 2014	122	1.69
James, the boy who could see ghosts, is back and informs Miles that he's moving away because his bowling alley is haunted. Miles tries to meet the ghost responsible, but is shocked when it turns out to be Ray. Meanwhile, Michelle's bakery is struggling, so she uses Louie's possession of Frankie to turn their rap video into a live performance at Pie Squared. When James discovers that Taylor and Miles fake-captured Ray, Taylor tells him that Ray and Miles really are ghosts, and he promises not to say anything.
23	23	"Haunted Boo Crew"	Eric Dean Seaton	Robert Peacock	April 26, 2014	123	1.96
Louie tries to join a boy club of ghosts called the Boo Crew and Frankie disguises herself as a boy to get in. Meanwhile, a conman tries to sue Michelle in court when he gets injured.
24	24	"Haunted Duel"	Trevor Kirschner	Boyce Bugliari & Jamie McLaughlin	May 17, 2014	125	1.91
After Ray boosts Louie's confidence, Louie challenges the toughest ghost at school to a ghost duel. Guest Star: Fred Stoller as Mr. Dobson
25	25	"Haunted Viking"	Roger Christiansen	Mike Dieffenbach & Heather Wordham	May 17, 2014	124	1.51
Taylor seeks Louie's help while writing a report on Vikings and Louie invites a ghost Viking who wreaks havoc and is difficult to contain.
26	26	"Haunted Voodoo"	Roger Christiansen	Ray Lancon & Bob Smiley	May 31, 2014	126	1.69
After Louie pulls a prank on Frankie, she decides to have a Louie voodoo doll made to exact her revenge. Ending 1: Miles spills water on Taylor's face then the two dance awkwardly. Ending 2: Taylor crushes her cake then puts whip cream on her face and Miles chews on his favorite bowtie.

=== Season 2 (2014–15) ===
No. overall	No. in season	Title	Directed by	Written by	Original release date	Prod. code	U.S. viewers (millions)
27	1	"Haunted Newbie"	Roger Christiansen	Boyce Bugliari & Jamie McLaughlin	June 28, 2014	202	1.35
Taylor is trying to help her new gymnastic member, a klutzy Meadow while Louie tries to prank her out of revenge, but unsuccessful in every attempts. At the same time, Miles asks Frankie to be his proxy for a spelling bee contest.
28	2	"Haunted Revenge"	Roger Christiansen	Heather Wordham	June 28, 2014	201	1.23
Frankie gets help from Louie in taking revenge on her arch-nemesis during the school festival, but conflict arise between them when Louie forgets to attend to help her; a small gathering at the bakery turns into a big party, and Taylor is conflicted on stopping it due to peer pressure.
29	3	"Mostly Ghostly Girl"	Jonathan Judge	Boyce Bugliari & Jamie McLaughlin	August 16, 2014	203–204	2.00
For accidentally causing her birthday party to be cancelled, Louie turns Frankie into a half ghost and takes her to Ghost World. After a change of heart about the party, Michelle is having a hard time finding entertainment while Ray tries to fill the spot. Meanwhile later Miles and Taylor enter Ghost World to help Louie break out a now fading-out-of-existence Frankie from ghost jail. Guest Stars: Brian Stepanek as Officer Goosebump Shad Gaspard as Officer Bugliari and Rixton as themselves
30	4	"Haunted Heartthrob"	Trevor Kirschner	Bob Smiley	September 6, 2014	205	1.45
Taylor has a crush on a school football player named Scott and Frankie is punished by Michelle for a week.
31	5	"Haunted Besties"	Trevor Kirschner	Ray Lancon	September 13, 2014	206	1.28
Feeling left out as Taylor always spend her time with Meadow, Miles tricks her by overshadowing Meadow and telling her to color her hair by herself. Louie and Frankie move out of the house into the treehouse.
32	6	"Haunted Mind Games"	Shannon Flynn	Maiya Williams	September 20, 2014	207	1.51
Wanting to get back at Taylor for intruding her room, Frankie plays mind games with her older sister when she's doing her school assignment with Scott. Meanwhile, Miles covers for Louie for haunting the bakery.
33	7	"Haunted Telescope"	Eric Dean Seaton	Blake J. Williger	September 27, 2014	208	1.45
After Louie volunteers to take care of the class ferret, he becomes possessed and breaks Miles telescope. Meanwhile, Taylor helps her mom with decorations to get into a party with Scott.
34	8	"Haunted Rapper"	Eric Dean Seaton	Blake J Williger	October 4, 2014	209	1.41
Taylor frames Frankie for stealing Scott's jacket. Louie wants to win a talent show.
35	9	"The Haunted Thundermans"	Trevor Kirschner	Boyce Bugliari & Jamie McLaughlin	October 11, 2014	211	2.49
When the Hathaways meet the Thundermans, they befriend each other, but when Phoebe is possessed by the Green Ghoul, they have to work together. Billy works with Frankie, Max works with Taylor and Miles, and Nora works with Louie. Guest star: Sydney Scotia as Amanda Note: This is one-hour special combined crossover episode with Nickelodeon's The Thundermans; Part 1 aired as an episode of The Thundermans.
36	10	"Haunted Secret"	Trevor Kirschner	Boyce Bugliari & Jamie McLaughlin	November 1, 2014	210	1.78
Taylor accidentally hits Meadow in the head while using Madame LaBeuf's staff when Louie tries to scare off Meadow while earning his ghost scouting badge. Meanwhile, Frankie tries to help Miles cope with Mirabella leaving for boarding school.
37	11	"Haunted Whodunnit"	Roger Christiansen	Robert Peacock	November 8, 2014	213	1.90
Frankie's new keyboard is destroyed in the middle of the night, leaving her to become a sleuth in determining who the culprit behind the act could be.
38	12	"Haunted Mascot"	Eric Dean Seaton	Lauren Bachelis	November 15, 2014	212	1.63
Taylor and Meadow let the inchworm mascot get stolen by a rivalry and they ask Miles for help. Meanwhile, Louie helps Michelle produce a commercial for the bakery.
39	13	"Haunted Charm School"	Trevor Kirschner	Bob Smiley	November 22, 2014	214	1.81
Frankie is sent to charm school because she's blamed for Louie making a mess.
40	14	"Haunted Temptation"	Eric Dean Seaton	Robert Peacock	February 23, 2015	217	1.76
After an argument on the phone with Scott, Taylor meets an intriguing guy named Antonio, who turns out to be a ghost. Meanwhile, Louie and Frankie discover swelling hormones in a pastry that Michelle is selling. Taylor must choose Scott or Antonio for a good boyfriend. Taylor changes her thought every second, but then realizes that Scott knows her and loves her more than Antonio, and that she only just met him. Guest Star: Nick Merico as Antonio
41	15	"Haunted Date"	Jonathan Weiss	Heather Wordham	February 24, 2015	215	1.68
Miles finds himself in an awkward date with Meadow, so Taylor insist of helping Miles hide his secret. Meanwhile, Frankie doesn't want to listen to Michelle's audio, but she also doesn't want to hurt Michelle's feelings, so Louie shape shifts into Frankie, but things get intense, so Louie ask Ray for help, so now Louie is Frankie and Ray is Louie, but then things get tied into a knot, and now Louie's teacher is Ray, Ray is Louie, and Louie is Frankie. Later, Frankie, Louie, and Ray apologizes for lying to Michelle, and for their punishment, she makes them suffer by listening to all of the audio, but it turns out that Miles shape shifted into all three of them.
42	16	"Haunted Toy Store"	Roger Christiansen	Greg Schaffer	February 25, 2015	216	1.73
Frankie and Louie want a toy that cost $4,000, but Michelle thinks that it's too much money to pay for whilst Ray introduces Miles' girlfriend to the family, who looks very similar to Taylor.
43	17	"Haunted Mentor"	Robert Peacock	Maiya Williams	February 26, 2015	219	1.29
Taylor announces to the family that Scott invited Taylor and them to meet his parents and she tell everyone to make a good first impression and not embarrass her. Meanwhile, Frankie is suspicious of one of Louie's classmates when she asks Louie to teach her how to be a better ghost whilst at the grocery store, Michelle talks to other customers while Taylor goes to get croutons. At Scott's house, Michelle looks at a picture of Scott's parents, but then realizes that his mom was the lady she put a plastic bag over, now Taylor must keep Scott's mom from ever seeing Michelle. Guest Stars: Laya Deleon Hayes as Delaney.
44	18	"Haunted Ghost Tour"	Robert Peacock	Boyce Bugliari & Jamie McLaughlin	March 2, 2015	218	2.00
Michelle gets the bakery included on a tour of haunted restaurants, and Louie has to pull off the haunt. Meanwhile, Taylor wants to be there for gymnastics, but Michelle needs her to babysit Frankie.
45	19	"Haunted Surprise"	Robert Peacock	Ray Lancon	March 3, 2015	220	1.60
Taylor wants to give Meadow a surprise party, but it accidentally gets complicated when Miles throws a wrench into the plan. Meanwhile, after a tragic sledding accident, Frankie breaks her wrist and is afraid to go to the hospital.
46	20	"Haunted Swamp"	Trevor Kirschner	Lauren Bachelis	March 4, 2015	221	1.28
After failing the test to become a level two ghost, Louie runs away from home and ends up in a dangerous part of Ghost World.
47	21	"Haunted Family"	Shannon Flynn	Mike Dieffenbach	March 5, 2015	222	1.48
When the ghost council finds out the Prestons have been living alongside humans, the council forces them to make a decision between haunting the Hathaways and leaving their home forever.

== Ratings ==
The Haunted Hathaways : U.S. viewers per episode (millions)

Season	Episode number																									
Season	1	2	3	4	5	6	7	8	9	10	11	12	13	14	15	16	17	18	19	20	21	22	23	24	25	26
1	3.35	2.79	2.11	2.40	2.34	1.90	2.07	2.40	1.62	1.71	2.56	2.40	1.83	1.98	2.55	1.93	2.41	2.73	2.56	1.84	1.81	1.69	1.96	1.91	1.51	1.69
2	1.35	1.23	2.00	1.45	1.28	1.51	1.45	1.41	2.49	1.78	1.90	1.63	1.81	1.76	1.68	1.73	1.29	2.00	1.60	1.28	1.48	–				

Audience measurement performed by Nielsen Media Research
