= Hathaways (novel series) =

Romance novel series by Lisa Kleypas

- First edition covers of the books
- Mine Till Midnight (2007); Seduce Me at Sunrise (2008); Tempt Me at Twilight (2009); Married By Morning (2010); Love in the Afternoon (2010)
- Author: Lisa Kleypas
- Country: United States
- Language: English
- Genre: Historical romance, historical fiction
- Publisher: Macmillan Publishers
- Published: 2007–2010
- Media type: Digital, print, audio
- No. of books: 5 (with one short story)

Hathaways is a series of five fictional historical romance novels written by Lisa Kleypas. Released from 2007 to 2010, it revolves around the orphaned Hathaway siblings who suddenly inherit a peerage and a property in Hampshire.

== Background and characters ==
Set in Victorian England, each novel in the series highlights one of the five orphaned Hathaway siblings – Leo, Amelia, Winifred "Win", Poppy, and Beatrix – who suddenly rise from the middle class to the ranks of nobility when a distant relative dies and leaves them a viscountcy and estate in Hampshire. Born in a family of scholars, all of them grew up discussing politics, world history, literature, and scientific advancement with their father, and are considered socially unconventional due to their lack of adherence to the laws of etiquette.

Amelia is the eldest of the Hathaways, a practical and self-imposed spinster who devotes herself to her siblings after a failed engagement. In Mine Till Midnight she meets Cam Rohan, a character that had already appeared in Kleypas's 2006 novel Devil in Winter from the Wallflowers series. Cam is the factotum of Jenner's, a gentlemen's gambling club, and was born to a Roma mother and an Irish father, hence he is isolated by both communities because of his mixed background. Afraid of losing contacts with his ethnic and cultural roots, he plans to abandon his considerable wealth and London lifestyle to join a group of traveling Romanies before meeting Amelia and joining her family.

Win was left as a fragile invalid after surviving scarlet fever a few years earlier and usually never does anything alone. For a long time she has been in love with Kev Merripen, whom her parents saved and welcomed into their house when he was a boy; her feelings are reciprocated, but Kev thinks he is unworthy of her because of his mysterious past and Romani origin. Contrary to Cam, who is later revealed to be his brother, Merripen is reticent to show and explain the Romani culture to others; he follows a Protestant work ethic, has a capitalist mentality, and ultimately integrates into the white world when he assumes the title of Lord Cavan from his grandfather. Win and Kev's story is told in Seduce Me at Sunrise.

Poppy is a young woman of beauty and wit, warm, talkative, and with a nerd side. In Tempt Me at Twilight she attracts the attention of Harry Rutledge, an isolated mechanical engineer from America who secretly prevents her engagement and manages to win her over. Harry is also the owner of the luxurious Rutledge Hotel, which Kleypas created by combining historical London hotels such as Brown's and Mivart's, and where many characters from her previous books have stayed. Harry's physical appearance is inspired by actor Richard Armitage.

Leo, Lord Ramsay, is a talented architect with a smart, cynical, and funny personality, but after witnessing the death of his fiancée he gave in to depression and a dissolute lifestyle, indulging in drinking, gambling, and prostitutes to extreme levels for a while before managing to reform himself. Over constant bickering and skirmishes, he falls for Catherine Marks, his sisters' lady-in-waiting of three years, who hides a past in which her aunt tried to sell her into prostitution. Their story is told in Married By Morning, where Leo must find a wife and produce an heir within a year so as not to lose the family estate.

Beatrix is the youngest of the siblings and the one who most detests social norms, preferring the company of animals to that of people, which she takes care of in the family home before releasing them back into the wild or keeping them as pets. In Love in the Afternoon she begins replying to the letters sent by Captain Christopher Phelan, who's fighting in the Crimean War, to his prospective fiancée, Beatrix's friend Prudence, and she falls in love with him over their correspondence even though she writes to him pretending to be Prudence. Their story has a Beauty and the Beast theme.

Besides Cam, a few other characters from the Wallflowers series (2004–2008) appear in the Hathaways, and the siblings live near Stony Cross, Lord Westcliff's manor from It Happened One Autumn.

== Publishing history ==
1. Mine Till Midnight (2007, Amelia's story)
2. Seduce Me at Sunrise (2008, Win's story)
3. Tempt Me at Twilight (2009, Poppy's story)
4. Married By Morning (2010, Leo's story)
5. Love in the Afternoon (2010, Beatrix's story)

A free short story, A Hathaway Wedding, was made available in 2009 by signing up to Macmillan's mailing list. Chronologically, it takes place immediately after Seduce Me at Sunrise, of which it constitutes the epilogue.

== Reception ==
Publishers Weekly described Mine Till Midnight as "another sexy exploration of 19th-century passion and peccadilloes, riveting from start to finish" and found that "the author's sensitivity to the prejudice endured by the Roma (Gypsies) adds a measure of grim reality that is creatively offset by Rohan's discussion of Roma beliefs and superstitions". USA Today wrote about Married by Morning that "this escapist delight features clever banter, sexual tension, a zesty pace and the unraveling of various mysteries, including why people fall in love". Love in the Afternoon was chosen by the Romantic Times as one of the 30 best regency romance novels of all time.

In 2009, Seduce Me at Sunrise sold 575,000 paperback copies in the United States, while Tempt Me at Twilight sold 515,000 hardcover copies.

== Adaptation ==
All five novels in the series have been adapted into manga between 2011 and 2017. Reiko Kishida illustrated Mine Till Midnight, Akino Nanami Seduce Me at Sunrise, Jun Hasegawa Tempt Me at Twilight, Chiho Saito Married by Morning, and Hibiki Sakuraya Love in the Afternoon.
