= The Wallflowers (British band) =

British indie/new wave band

- Origin: Slough, England
- Genres: Indie pop, new wave
- Years active: 1985–present
- Labels: Mantre Records, Idea Records
- Past members: Peter D. Brickley; Kent Davies; John Strachan; Vic Doyle; Tracy Owen; Pete Smith; Steve Philliben; Stuart Timmons; Brian Cooper

The Wallflowers (also known as the Wallflowers UK to avoid confusion with the American band) are a British indie/new wave band from Slough, England, formed by Peter Brickley in 1985.

== History ==
In 1983, Peter Brickley was a member of a band called the Telephone Boxes, which had supported the Smiths on their first UK tour. After having recorded a few demos for various uninterested record companies, the band split. In 1985, Brickley formed his own band under the name the Wallflowers. They signed a publishing deal with Intersong/Warner Chappell Music. The Wallflowers released three singles: "Blushing Girl Nervous Smile" in 1986 (produced by Pete Hammond of PWL), "Thank You" in 1987 (produced by Andy Partridge of XTC), and "83.7 Degrees" in 1987. A number of other tracks were recorded for a planned album which was to be titled Love, Peace and Pugwash, but was never released, due to the withdrawal of Warner/Chappell. Johnny Marr of the Smiths was also due to work with the band on the album, but due to matters surrounding the Smiths splitting up around this time, it did not push through. Love, Peace and Pugwash was eventually self-released by the band in 2012.

== Discography ==
=== Albums ===
- Love, Peace and Pugwash (1988; unreleased until 2012)
- The Singles (compilation) (2010)
- P Folk (2013; self-released)

=== Singles ===
- "Blushing Girl Nervous Smile" (1986)
- "Thank You" (1987)
- "83.7 Degrees" (1987)
