= List of The Thundermans episodes =

The Thundermans is an American comedy television series created by Jed Spingarn that aired on Nickelodeon from October 14, 2013 to May 25, 2018. The series stars Kira Kosarin, Jack Griffo, Addison Riecke, Diego Velazquez, Chris Tallman, Rosa Blasi, and Maya Le Clark, and features the voice of Dana Snyder as Dr. Colosso.

== Series overview ==
Season	Episodes	Originally released	
Season	Episodes	First released	Last released
1	20	October 14, 2013	June 14, 2014
2	24	September 13, 2014	March 28, 2015
3	25	June 27, 2015	October 10, 2016
4	29	October 22, 2016	May 25, 2018

== Episodes ==
=== Season 1 (2013–14) ===
No. overall	No. in season	Title	Directed by	Written by	Original release date	Prod. code	U.S. viewers (millions)
1	1	"Adventures in Supersitting"	Bob Koherr	Jed Spingarn	October 14, 2013	101	2.39
The Thundermans are a family of superheroes who are trying to live a normal life in Hiddenville. The two oldest children, twins Phoebe and Max Thunderman, must babysit their younger siblings, Nora and Billy, while their parents, Hank and Barb, go out to dinner. Phoebe disobeys her parents' orders when she invites her best friend Cherry over and accidentally exposes the family's superpowers. As for Max, he uses Nora and Billy to work on evil tasks in his bedroom lair. Hank and Barb are enjoying dinner until they overhear that a party entertainer who was to be Thunderman at a child's birthday party could not perform. Hank does not want to disappoint the child so he decides to wear his Thunderman supersuit without exposing his superhero identity. Guest star: Audrey Whitby (Cherry)
2	2	"Phoebe vs. Max"	Jonathan Judge	David Hoge & Dan Cross	November 2, 2013	104	2.60
A prank war between Max and Phoebe gets out of hand. At first Max dumps melted cheese and chocolate on Phoebe's head and transfers her bed into the school. Later, Phoebe tricks Max into dressing up as a hula dancer. Max reveals to Phoebe that the only reason he is evil is because he does not want to live in his sister's shadow and be second best so he would rather be best at being evil. Hank and Barb try a new parenting style by letting the children handle their own problems and Nora and Billy have a trash competition. Guest star: Audrey Whitby
3	3	"Dinner Party"	Victor Gonzalez	Jed Spingarn	November 9, 2013	102	1.85
Just as Hank reminds the children about no non-superheroes in the house, Max plans to sabotage dinner when Phoebe invites her crush, Cole Campbell, and his rich family over. However, just as Max's plans are in play, his crush, Tara, also arrives with the family. This forces Phoebe and Max to work together to keep the night from turning into a complete disaster, while they also deal with Nora, Billy, and their parents, who are embarrassing them and their guests. When Hank drinks soup that had a gallon of hot sauce poured into it, he spits it out on Cole's mother, leaving them to want to storm out. Phoebe convinces them to stay, and they do. However, Cole's parents forbid him from hanging out with Phoebe ever again, calling the Thundermans "classless hooligans". Max gets rid of them by serving them the casserole, which explodes in their faces. The Campbells leave in disgust, but Cole promises he's still going to hang out with Phoebe regardless, revealing that he doesn't care whatever punishment he gets. Hank lifts the no non-superheroes rule because none of the kids used their powers, much to Max's anger, as he can't see Tara regardless of whether it is lifted or not. Tara comes by again and asks Max to call her. Max, in happiness, changes his argument. Guest stars: Audrey Whitby, Logan Shroyer (Cole Campbell), Katherine McNamara (Tara), Robert Curtis Brown (Gerald Campbell), Margaret Easley (Fiona Campbell)
4	4	"Report Card"	Jonathan Judge	Nancy Cohen	November 16, 2013	103	1.89
Max changes the grades on his report card and is moved into an advanced class, at first only to annoy Phoebe and win the class over, but later becomes serious about competing. The competition is tight, and near the end, Phoebe and Max both use their superpowers to make the other team's player unable to speak. Meanwhile, Nora, Billy, and Hank try to catch a newspaper thief and learn that the culprit is actually Dr. Colosso. Back at the Math Bowl, the two teams are tied, which results in a sudden death round with a tiebreaker question where only the team captains, Phoebe and Max, can answer. They get a question which Max happens to know the answer to, but he deliberately gives a wrong answer to make Phoebe's team win. Guest stars: Kelly Perine (Math Bowl host), Elijah Nelson (Evan), Keely Marshall (Sarah)
5	5	"Ditch Day"	David Kendall	Dicky Murphy	November 23, 2013	107	2.36
Max and Phoebe create some fun for themselves on Ditch Day, but it becomes a race against time to rush to school and erase footage of Phoebe and Max using their powers. However, as they try to get to the principal's office, they have to participate in a country-western-themed dance to keep the guests from knowing their actual motives. Meanwhile, Barb is sick and Hank is babysitting Nora and Billy, who are trying to get in on Phoebe and Max's plans, while Hank stays at home and watches the movie Space Kitties. Guest star: Mary Passeri (Ms. Williams)
6	6	"This Looks Like a Job For..."	Robbie Countryman	Anthony Q. Farrell	November 30, 2013	109	1.79
Both Phoebe and Max want new phones but their parents refuse because the phones are expensive. So, Phoebe and Max interview for a job at Mrs. Wong's. Phoebe and Tyler get hired but Tyler is quickly fired after sneezing. So, Max gets Tyler's job forcing the Thunder Twins to learn to work together in harmony. Mrs. Wong fires them on the first day for ruining everything and failing to work together, but they convince her to hire them back. While Mrs. Wong is away, they accept a huge order of pizzas so that they can make all the money they need in one day. The twins can't keep up with the machine's speed and are forced to slow it down by blocking it with pizza. The machine builds pressure and explodes covering Mrs. Wong with pizza dough. She fires them again. Back at home, they realize that Nora and Billy had bought phones after betting against Barb in sports-stacking. The Thunder Twins blackmail their little siblings to give them the phones but Nora zaps and melts the phones with her laser eyes. Guest stars: Helen Hong (Mrs. Wong), Storm Reid (Avery)
7	7	"Weekend Guest"	David Kendall	Dan Serafin	December 7, 2013	106	1.96
Hank and Barb leave Max and Phoebe in charge of the house as they go Metroburg for the will reading of Barb's late Uncle "All American Blob" Wilfred. They expect their Uncle to leave them a lot of inheritance but instead Cousin Blobbin inherits all his wealth and mansions. Meanwhile back at home, Phoebe's teacher has asked her to babysit a Venus Fly Trap for them. She reveals to her siblings that the plant feeds on flies. Max becomes obsessed with feeding the plant stuff and enlists Nora and Billy to steal it from Phoebe, forcing Phoebe to be on guard at all times. Phoebe accidentally drops an entire tube of water on the plant, causing it to start dying. Max helps fix the plant on condition that Phoebe will let him feed it anything he wants. Phoebe takes the deal. Max brings the plant back to life and feeds it a lot of food, causing it to mutate and grow really big. The plant swallows Dr. Colosso and starts attacking the kids. Since the plant is immune to powers, they're forced to come up with an antidote and figure out a way to feed it to the plant. They save Dr. Colosso and the plant grows down to its normal size. Guest star: John Hartmann (Mr. Finster)
8	8	"You Stole My Thunder, Man"	Shannon Flynn	Sean W. Cunningham & Marc Dworkin	December 7, 2013	113	1.72
Phoebe is running for class president and she gives Max and Cherry questions to ask her to make her look good during her speech. While reading the questions, Max starts complaining that those are not the things that students care about. He ends up leading an unexpected rant about what students really want. This ultimately gets him elected the class president even though he wasn't running. Phoebe becomes Max's vice president and gives him her "three pronged approach" ideas to present to Principal Bradford. Max presents the ideas with a few improvements as his own without giving Phoebe credit. This makes Phoebe mad especially since Max has been taking advantage of her. Nora advises Phoebe to get revenge on Max by feeding him a Russian plant that's guaranteed to give Max a bad stomachache for days, during which Phoebe would become president. Flunky tastes the pizza with the plant first and accidentally knocks Max down his lair. Max falls on the rocks that Billy and Hank had been hiding in his lair. He gets badly injured and asks Phoebe to take over as the class president and unveil his new smoothie machine. After learning from Nora that Phoebe did it on purpose, Max sets up the smoothie machine to explode. During the unveiling, Phoebe feels guilty and the twins apologize to each other. Principal Bradford becomes impatient and opens the smoothie machine himself, causing it to explode on him. Guest stars: Audrey Whitby, Jeff Meacham (Principal Bradford), Jace Norman (Flunky)
9	9	"Weird Science Fair"	Jonathan Judge	Mike Alber & Gabe Snyder	January 4, 2014	105	2.22
Nora and Billy are preparing for an upcoming science fair and Phoebe warns them not to mention science fair in front of Max because it brings back bad memories. They do it anyway, causing Max to narrate how he lost fifth grade science to Phoebe after his device malfunctioned. Max then starts helping Nora with her project so that he can use it to prove himself. Phoebe starts helping Billy too, leading to a competition between the Thunder Twins. Phoebe and Max forcibly take over Billy and Nora's projects for a chance to reclaim their science victory. So, Nora gives Billy an idea to sabotage the twins during the presentation. During the science fair, both Phoebe and Max take over the presentations as well. Both of their projects malfunction leading to explosions. Nora and Billy remind Max and Phoebe to never take over their projects again. Phoebe's science medal is taken away and the Thunder Twins are both banned from science fairs for being a disgrace to the science community. Guest star: Renee Percy (Lisa)
10	10	"Crime After Crime"	Shannon Flynn	Lisa Muse Bryant	January 11, 2014	112	2.60
The Thundermans and their neighbors are concerned about a new neighborhood vandal who has been going around vandalizing things. Mrs. Wong, her niece Darcy and other neighbors come over to the Thunderman residence to form a neighborhood watch group, with Hank as the captain. Both Mrs. Wong and Phoebe suspect Max as the vandal but Max denies it. So, Phoebe follows Max and busts him sneaking out. She follows closely behind only to find him riding a small bike. Max admits that he's been sneaking to practise riding a bike but he can't let anyone know because it's embarrassing. So, when the next crime is committed and Mrs. Wong sees Max all muddy, she concludes that Max did it. Max admits being the vandal to avoid revealing his bike secret. Mrs. Wong takes over the captainship from Hank. Phoebe persuades Max to tell them the truth, after which the Thundermans plan to capture the vandal in action at the park to prove that Max is innocent. The Thundermans spend all night undercover at the Hiddenville Park. The vandal turns out to be Darcy. She tells them that she enjoys destroying other people's property and tells the Thundermans to watch their back. Guest stars: Haley Tju (Darcy Wong), Helen Hong
11	11	"Going Wonkers"	Robbie Countryman	Jay J. Demopoulos	February 8, 2014	110	2.36
The Achilles comet is passing Earth, and it is making the Thundermans' powers go crazy. Phoebe cannot go to the school dance with Cole because of the comet, unless she and Max stay three feet together. The dance goes terrible as Max ruins the night for them, with Max getting involved in a dance-off, prompting Cole to leave. Phoebe attempts to make Cole forgive her before his family leaves for a week-long trip. Meanwhile, the rest of the family try to control their powers. Guest stars: Logan Shroyer, Keely Marshall, Chantz Simpson (Jacob), Cassidy Shaffer (Cortni)
12	12	"Restaurant Crashers"	Trevor Kirschner	Dicky Murphy	February 15, 2014	111	1.79
It's Hank and Barb's anniversary, and Hank has bought Barb a new car, which is red, as a surprise birthday gift. Phoebe finds out about the car which is a problem because she is not good at keeping such secrets. Hank tries his best to make sure Phoebe won't tell anyone. While Hank and Barb are away, Phoebe accidentally tells Max, Billy and Nora about the car. They get inside to check it out but accidentally get it dented. Now, they must fix the car before their parents return home. They ask Cousin Blobbin to help fix it but he says he will do it on condition that Hank says he loves him since he had failed to say it earlier. Max shows Phoebe a phone app he uses to edit words together that they could use to make it sound as if Hank said "I love you, Blobbin." All they need to do is sneak into the restaurant and make sure Hank says those words in any order. It doesn't go as smooth as planned but after finally getting the words, they replay them to Blobbin who buys a new car to replace the dented one. Hank figures out what happened since the new car is silver, but he doesn't get mad at Phoebe because Barb loves the new car and reveals that she wouldn't have liked the red car. Guest star: Harvey Guillén (Blobbin)
13	13	"Thundersense"	Jonathan Judge	Dan Serafin	March 15, 2014	114	2.37
After gaining her 'Thundersense' (the ability to sense danger right before it happens, Phoebe saves a boy who was about to be hit by a lunch cart. She gets really overconfident and gets carried away by being the hero of the day. Then, she accidentally knocks down a pyramid of cheerleaders, she hides in her room and loses all of her confidence, despite her family trying to restore it. Meanwhile, Max gets gifts from Barb as he attracts sympathy for not having his Thundersense. Billy and Nora find out, and threaten to tell Barb, after he got an expensive computer, unless he gets them a trampoline. Billy uses his super speed to bounce really quickly on the trampoline, and bounces up, to get stuck on part of the roof. After doubting the situation, Phoebe saves Billy, and Max accidentally reveals to the family that he has Thundersense, which bids him goodbye to his computer. Guest star: Audrey Whitby
14	14	"Phoebe's a Clone Now"	David DeLuise	Jenn Lloyd & Kevin Bonani	March 15, 2014	108	2.46
Phoebe commits herself to too many activities and Max helps her out by creating a clone so she can be at two places at once. However, like many of Max's ideas, it doesn't work out very well. Clone Phoebe becomes really dumb due to a book falling on her head. Phoebe and Max attempt to restrain the clone by selling brownies at Phoebe and Cherry's bake sale, but it escapes, leaving Phoebe tied and gagged under the table. Max eventually manages to stop the clone. Meanwhile, Nora and Billy must find a dance routine for their school talent show. Guest star: Audrey Whitby
15	15	"Have an Ice Birthday"	Timothy Ryder	Sean W. Cunningham & Marc Dworkin	March 22, 2014	115	1.67
It's Phoebe and Max's birthday and they are planning on throwing a huge party with their friends instead of the usual family activities they do every year. So, the twins ask Mrs. Wong to use Wong's Pizza Palace for their birthday party. Max freezes Mrs. Wong to prevent her from finding out that he invited the entire class. Mrs. Wong's frozen "statue" is mistakenly carried by a dojo class while picking up their pizza. Max and Phoebe are forced to leave their own party in order to get Mrs. Wong back. At the dojo, Phoebe pretends to be "the Chosen One" in order to convince the sensei to let them have the statue back. The twins take Mrs. Wong back only to find that the party is over. They unfreeze her and go back home to celebrate their birthday with their family. Meanwhile, after being rejected by Max and Phoebe, Barb and Hank try to make the best of it by making use of Billy and Nora before they grow up. They spend the entire day filming Billy and Nora do the same puppet show over and over, much to the kids' dismay. Guest stars: Audrey Whitby, Helen Hong, Elijah Nelson, Kel Mitchell (Sensei Kenny)
16	16	"Nothing to Lose Sleepover"	Sean Mulcahy	Gigi McCreery & Perry Rein	April 26, 2014	117	1.77
Phoebe hosts a sleepover and exposes her powers to save the party. She now has to wear anklets that prevent her from using her powers. In his lair, Max watches a wrestling match on the 3D TV, while Hank accepts a bet to break Billy's indestructobot, but is repeatedly unsuccessful in doing so. Guest stars: Audrey Whitby, Keely Marshall, Krista Marie Yu (Ashley), Teala Dunn (Kelsey)
17	17	"Pretty Little Choirs"	Shannon Flynn	David Hoge & Dan Cross	May 3, 2014	118	1.67
Phoebe faces a tough rival in the school choir, a snooty girl named Veronica. Max helps Phoebe with revenge, but he instead becomes her "boyfriend". However, he soon learns the truth that he really is not her boyfriend, according to her. Meanwhile, Nora and Billy must infiltrate Darcy's home to retrieve Dr. Colosso, after Darcy heard him talk and stole him. At the same time, Darcy insults Barb's hairdo just after Barb tells Hank to let insults roll off his back. Barb gets her hair dyed orange in spite and makes it worse using Max's chemicals to try and change it back. Guest stars: Audrey Whitby, Elijah Nelson, Haley Tju, Gilland Jones (Veronica)
18	18	"Paging Dr. Thunderman"	Robbie Countryman	Jed Spingarn	May 3, 2014	119	1.76
While Hank and Barb drive Nora to a prestigious school interview, Phoebe and Max must babysit Billy. Max and Billy play Danger Disk in the house and Billy injures his thumb. They now have to get Billy to the hospital. The problem is Billy's biology is different. They manage to fool the doctor and get the prescription to the thumb, but Max faints due to a needle, and now they have to get the brain scan results. Meanwhile, Hank and Nora simply want the free ice cream the school offers, but when two snotty girls say that Nora could never make it in, she goes too far trying to prove she can get in. However, she realizes she'll miss going to school with Billy, and she, Hank, and Barb get Nora kicked out with an ice cream mess. Guest star: Caitlin Muelder (Dean Bartholet), Rodney J. Hobbs (Dr. Miller)
19	19	"Up, Up, and Vacay!"	Jonathan Judge	Anthony Q. Farrell	May 31, 2014	116	1.60
After one year living in Hiddenville, the family realizes that they are in need of a vacation. Max and Phoebe reveal that their school is holding a competition between different families, the winning one getting to go on a vacation of their choice. However, the family cannot agree on where to go on their vacation. While Phoebe, Nora and Barb choose to visit castles, Hank, Max and Billy choose the beach. They try to resolve it in a small competition, but they clash, Phoebe cheating because of Max saying "any means necessary". The boys and the girls decide to compete separately in the family competition, the boys as the Thundermans while the girls are the "Secondplacemans" (Max had registered for the competition early and decided to register the girls by that name). At the end of the day, the boys and the girls both end up in the finals. Back at home, the tension intensifies, as the family won't even share a table or eat with each other. This hurts Billy and Nora, who convinces each of their teams to deliberately lose to the other. During the finals the next day, the girls try hard to lose on purpose, not realizing the boys are trying to lose on purpose as well. In the end, they realize family is more important and work together as a family to stop another family who were also in the finals from getting to the finish line. Guest star: Jeff Meacham Note: There are two different endings to this episode. In the original ending, which was the only one released on iTunes, the Thundermans crawl to the finish line and go to the castles. An alternate ending was shown on Nickelodeon after the first one, in which Max is thrown over the finish line and they go to the beach.
20	20	"Breaking Dad"	Shannon Flynn	Jed Spingarn	June 14, 2014	120	2.16
Phoebe gets upset when her science teacher gives her a B, so Hank replaces her teacher and the class' grades. However, she unexpectedly gets a D as her new grade is after she did her project (Hank had given her that grade as she did the same project back in school in Metroburg). Also, Hank falls asleep from eating one of Max's sleeping sandwiches, and it's up to Phoebe and Max to save him during the science presentation. Meanwhile, Nora and Billy work with Barb and Dr. Colosso to try and get rid of squirrels which entered into the house when the back door was left open. In the end, Hank gives Max one of his sleeping sandwiches for dinner causing Max to fall asleep, which gives the family an excuse to draw on his face. Guest stars: Audrey Whitby, Jeff Meacham, Andrew Friedman (Mr. Begbouday)

=== Season 2 (2014–15) ===
No. overall	No. in season	Title	Directed by	Written by	Original release date	Prod. code	U.S. viewers (millions)
21	1	"Thunder Van"	Jonathan Judge	Lisa Muse Bryant	September 13, 2014	203	1.56
Hank wants Phoebe to be a good superhero by making her do grueling work, but she'd rather go to the movies with Cherry. The kids take a joyride in the Thunder Van prompting Hank to teach them a lesson. Phoebe and Max go to places that could be dangerous until their parents find out and tell them it was fake because they thought it was a criminal. Phoebe admits she doesn't want to take the test early and go to hero university and instead wants to stay in Hiddenville.
22	2	"Four Supes and a Baby"	Jonathan Judge	Dan Serafin	September 20, 2014	201	1.38
Phoebe has an obsessive crush over Dylan. After figuring out that Dylan takes care of his little brother, Phoebe lies to him that she takes care of her little brother and sister too. So, they agree to meet at the park for their babies' playdate. Meanwhile, Max gets a safe from Dark Mayhem and forces Billy and Nora to help open it with their powers. Phoebe uses telekinesis to pull Nora and Billy from Max's Lair and force them to go to the park with her. Max comes to the park and takes the kids back so that they can open the safe. He mistakenly grabs Rusty's stroller, mistaking it for Nora's Baby Lulu stroller. Phoebe discovers that Max took the real baby and left them with Baby Lulu. Max is forced to take care of baby Rusty as he tries to figure out a way to go past his parents. At the park, Phoebe keeps Dylan away from the baby while waiting for Max to return the real baby. Dylan gets suspicious and Phoebe is about to tell him the truth when Max, Nora and Billy arrive just in time. They swap the babies. Dylan grabs Rusty and leaves angrily, refusing to ever go on a date with Phoebe again. Guest stars: Audrey Whitby, Jordan Fisher (Dylan)
23	3	"Max's Minions"	Sean Mulcahy	Anthony Q. Farrell	September 27, 2014	205	1.53
After Max's prank on the principal, the geeks from school start to ask him for advice on how to prank people. Max teaches them and calls them his minions, but when they betray Max and make him the victim of a humiliating prank, Max must find a way to regain his reputation as the baddest boy in school. Meanwhile, when Phoebe wants to go to a club with Cherry and her other friends, Hank and Barb want her to do her chores before she goes, so she enlists the help of Nora and Billy. Guest stars: Audrey Whitby, Jeff Meacham, Major Curda (Lionel), Phillip Wampler (Jake), Jacob Timothy Manown (Tom), Teala Dunn
24	4	"Pheebs Will Rock You"	Robbie Countryman	Sean W. Cunningham & Marc Dworkin	October 4, 2014	208	1.83
Phoebe tells Barb that she has a crush on a new student, a rocker called Oyster who writes the cutest lyrics. She wishes someone would introduces her to him - just before Max enters the room with Oyster. Max tells them that him, Oyster, Gideon and Angus are starting a band together. Phoebe asks Max to set her up with Oyster but Max refuses claiming that Oyster is a bad boy and Phoebe is too good. So, Phoebe puts on dark makeup and starts acting like a bad girl to impress Oyster. Max doesn't want his bandmates dating his sister but Oyster insists that his guitar chose Phoebe. Oyster quits the band and takes Phoebe on a date. During the date, Phoebe realizes that Oyster is obsessed with his guitar. Even the cute lyrics he wrote were for his guitar. She wants to end the date but plays along to prove Max wrong. Max's attempts to prove that Phoebe is not Oyster's type fail. So, he hires a former prisoner to give both Phoebe and Oyster matching mohawks as a gift for their love. Phoebe freaks out and admits that Max was right: she and Oyster are not compatible. She helps Oyster rejoin Max's Band. Guest stars: Tanner Stine (Oyster), Helen Hong, Jim McCaffree (Principal Manbeck), Lizzy Greene (Morgan)
25	5	"The Haunted Thundermans"	Trevor Kirschner	Jed Spingarn	October 11, 2014	212	2.49
When the Thundermans meet the Hathaways and Prestons, they befriend each other, but when Phoebe is possessed by the Green Ghoul, they have to work together. Meanwhile, Nora, Billy, and Frankie are in the city and get sweets. Frankie doesn't want Louie's help because he isn't as clever, but later discovers that she needs his help. Guest stars: JT Neal (Scott Tomlinson), Chase Austin (Chad), David Ury (Green Ghoul), Daniele Gaither (Super President Kickbutt) Note: This is a double-length combined crossover special episode with Nickelodeon's The Haunted Hathaways.
26	6	"Shred It Go"	David Kendall	Sasha Stroman	November 1, 2014	207	2.21
Phoebe wants to win tickets to an MKTO concert. Max's crush Cassandra at Splatburger turns out to be a big fan of MKTO. Max pretends to be a fan too so that he can go to the concert with her. So, Max helps Phoebe win two concert tickets, one for him. When Phoebe misplaces the tickets, she assumes that they were shredded by their dad's new shredder. Max finds the tickets but before giving them to Phoebe, he learns that Cassandra didn't win any ticket and Colosso tells him to use the tickets to take Cassandra to the concert. So, he hides the tickets from Phoebe and gives Phoebe's to Cassandra. Max faces a series of misfortunes, making it impossible to get to the concert. Cassandra takes embarrassing video clips of Max. Meanwhile, back at Splatburger, Phoebe is surprised to see MKTO enter the room. After pretending that she doesn't know them, she gives in and tells them that she's big fan. They perform a private concert for her. Meanwhile, Nora is jealous when she thinks the family is replacing her with the shredder. Guest stars: Sydney Park (Cassandra); Malcolm Kelley, Tony Oller (as MKTO); Tanner Stine, Rob Ramsay (Jay Jay)
27	7	"Blue Detective"	Alex Zamm	Sean W. Cunningham & Marc Dworkin	November 8, 2014	217	2.06
Max is on a date with Maddy at Splatburger when he mysteriously turns blue. Maddy freaks out and runs away. Max goes home and calls for an emergency family meeting to try to figure out who turned him blue. For each one of them, he lists reasons why they had the motive to turn him blue. During the interrogations, Phoebe turns blue too. So, they narrow their interrogations to Nora and Billy who fail to comply. The twins run out of ideas until Maddy comes back to apologize to Barb for losing her bracelet. Maddy's allergies kick off again, which helps Max resolve the mystery. Max figures out that it was Dr. Colosso who turned him blue. Dr. Colosso admits to committing the crime but says he only did it because he loves Max and didn't want to lose him to Maddy. Guest stars: Rob Ramsay, Gabrielle Elyse (Maddy)
28	8	"Cheer and Present Danger"	Jonathan Judge	Jed Spingarn	November 15, 2014	202	1.99
Phoebe and Cherry's friendship goes in jeopardy when only one of them makes the cheerleading squad. At the same time, when Max wins a contest at Mrs. Wong's pizza shop, everyone believes he cheated, resulting in all of the deliveries containing fish heads as the topping. Meanwhile, Nora and Billy keep a stray cat as their pet. Guest stars: Audrey Whitby, Helen Hong, Jeff Meacham, Brooke Sorenson (Madison)
29	9	"Change of Art"	Carl Lauten	David Hoge & Dan Cross	November 22, 2014	204	1.81
Phoebe is jealous of Max's art skills especially because their art teacher keeps praising Max's master pieces while trashing Phoebe's lack of skills. Phoebe later discovers that Max has been using Billy to steal paintings and other art pieces for him. She asks Billy to steal one for her so that she can present it for the class art auction. During the auction, Billy reveals that Phoebe's vase is from the Hiddenville museum. Barb buys Phoebe's vase after which Phoebe takes it to return it to the museum. Phoebe, Max and Billy sneak to the museum while Nora tries to keep the auction going by pushing both Sarah and Barb to not give up bidding for Max's painting. Max uses the opportunity at the museum to take an art thief selfie as part of his efforts to impress his followers on Evilgram. They return to the auction just in time before they're busted. Guest stars: Jeff Meacham, Keely Marshall, Stephanie Escajeda (Mrs. Matson)
30	10	"Winter Thunderland"	Michael Shea	Wesley Jermaine Johnson & Scott Taylor	November 29, 2014	215	2.12
The night before Christmas, Phoebe assigns secret Santas to the family. Max gets Nora and makes it clear that he won't get her any gift. At night, Max is visited by different versions of Phoebe as Christmas Spirits. The Spirit of Christmas past shows Max how no matter how many times he tried to ruin past Christmas days, it backfired and turned into a good gift. The Spirit of Christmas present shows him how Nora would be disappointed to find no gift from Max. So, Max decides to ruin the entire family's Christmas by stealing all the gifts. After going back to bed, he's visited by the Spirit of Christmas Future who shows him how the Thundermans family broke apart and turned evil following that Christmas. Nora is the only one who tried to be good but she's struggling hard to make it. After seeing what happens to Nora, Max feels very sad and decides to give his family the best Christmas ever.
31	11	"Parents Just Don't Thunderstand"	David Kendall	Dicky Murphy	January 24, 2015	206	1.65
Phoebe and Max want to sneak to Winnie Lee's unsupervised party but Barb and Hank bust them. So, Phoebe asks Max to use his BrainMelt-3000 gadget to wipe their parents' adult memory in order to remind them how it is being a teen. They successfully make Barb and Hank think they're still teens. The twins leave for Winnie Lee's party but on their way, they learn that the party has moved to the Thundermans house - Barb and Hank are throwing the party. It's fun at first but Max and Phoebe quickly realize things are getting out of control and they can easily get exposed. They want to reverse the effects of the BrainMelt so that their parents can end the party but the BrainMelt isn't fully charged. So, they trick Hank and Barb into kissing, triggering electric sparks from Barb just like the first time Hank and Barb kissed. They use Barb's electricity to recharge the BrainMelt. After being turned back to normal, Hank and Barb end the party and punish the twins. Guest stars: Audrey Whitby, Harvey Guillen, Brooke Sorenson, Tanner Stine
32	12	"Meet the Evilmans"	Sean Mulcahy	Sasha Stroman	February 23, 2015	216	2.16
Thunder Man's old enemy Evilman moves next door to Hiddenville and Phoebe starts dating his son Link. When Hank brings this up to Super President Kickbutt, she tells him that the Hero League can't arrest Evilman since he is retired. Guest stars: Eric Allan Kramer (Evilman), Barrett Carnahan (Link), Rob Ramsay, Daniele Gaither
33	13	"The Neverfriending Story"	Shannon Flynn	Sona Panos	February 24, 2015	211	1.77
When Phoebe and Max's friends begin to hang out with each other, they must put a stop to it, but their plans are put on hold when Hank and Barb order them to babysit Nora and Billy. Max freezes Nora and Billy, but they break free, realizing that they are home alone and can do anything they want.
34	14	"You've Got Fail"	Shannon Flynn	Lisa Muse Bryant	February 25, 2015	210	2.01
Max is using Nora and Billy to shoot an epic fail video to post for a contest on Chirper social media. Phoebe is making a video to invite people to buy tickets to the upcoming ballet recital. Billy accidentally lets the skateboard roll towards Phoebe, causing to trip and fall in a big epic fail. Max steals Phoebe's phone and posts the video of Phoebe falling. The Epic Fallerina video becomes an instant hit, attracting a lot of people to buy Phoebe's tickets to see her fall during the ballet performance. Phoebe's ballet teacher kicks her out of the recital because of the video. So, Phoebe hacks Max's computer to send an email as Max admitting that he faked the video. Phoebe gets accepted back to the ballet performance. Max is ready to make Phoebe fall on stage and record it on video but Phoebe anticipates all his moves. So, Max locks Phoebe in a closet so that he can be the epic fail for his video. Phoebe escapes from the closet and goes to the stage to humiliate Max. She then gets the video from Gideon and posts it on Chirper, winning the video contest. Guest stars: Kenny Ridwan (Gideon), Evelyn Edwards (Madame Gigi)
35	15	"Doubles Trouble"	Jonathan Judge	Anthony Q. Farrell and Dicky Murphy	February 26, 2015	220	1.55
Phoebe wants to have more activities in common with Link. So, she agrees to go to Lacroix country club for a tennis tournament. She blackmails Max intro training her how to play tennis but Max offers to help her cheat instead. During the doubles game at the country club, Max uses telekinesis to help Phoebe do well in the game. However, he gets distracted when President Lacroix's brother shows Max how great country club life can be. Max mistakes him for the president of the club. So, he decides to play with Lacroix instead of helping Phoebe. Phoebe gets mad at Max for bailing on her. They both attack each other with their powers during the final game. Max's team wins and he lets the pride takes control of him. He disrespects the real President Lacroix before realizing that his partner was just the president's brother. The country club takes away the trophy from Max and kicks him out. Guest stars: Barrett Carnahan, David Shatraw (Theodore Lacroix)
36	16	"Who's Your Mommy?"	Carl Lauten	Anthony Q. Farrell	March 2, 2015	213	2.37
With rising summer heat, the Thundermans kids want to get a pool but Hank and Barb refuse to buy one. Phoebe suggests running a yard sale to make the money they need to buy the pool. During the day of the sale, Barb finds Phoebe going through her "Electress" box which contains Electress comic books and her whip. She tells Phoebe she can't sell the content and must return it to the attic but Phoebe gets distracted by a cute boy app. Max sells the box and its contents to Cedric who loves comic books. After realizing that they weren't supposed to sell it, Max tries to get the box back but Cedric refuses to give back Electress's whip - unless it's to Electress herself. So, Max and Phoebe come up with a plan for Phoebe to pretend to be Elecress and get the whip back. At Cedric's house, the Thunder Twins discover a lot of things they didn't know about their mom. Since Cedric is a big fan of Electress, he quickly figures out they're lying. So, he ties them up with the Electress's whip which starts to explode. Barb finally tracks the whip and teleports there to get the whip before it hurts someone. She saves Max and Phoebe and thanks Cedric for being a great fan. Back at home, the kids ask Barb to tell them her superhero stories as Electress. Guest star: Thomas Barbusca (Cedric)
37	17	"The Amazing Rat Race"	Eric Dean Seaton	Dicky Murphy	March 3, 2015	214	1.96
In order to win a rat race with his band members to decide whether or not they should play at the dance, Max turns Billy into a rat using the Animalizer, but after being turned into a rat, Billy doesn't want to be turned back into a human. At the same time, Phoebe and Cherry are in charge of the school dance, and Hank and Barb try to get Nora to face her fear of rats. However, when the exterminator catches Billy, Nora goes to extreme measures to save him. Guest stars: Audrey Whitby, Tanner Stine, Kenny Ridwan, Justice Smith (Angus), Wes Robertson (Darryl)
38	18	"Mall Time Crooks"	Robbie Countryman	Wesley Jermaine Johnson & Scott Taylor	March 4, 2015	209	1.60
The family is determined to not ruin yet another one of Hank's birthdays, but when Phoebe and Max have been assigned to get Hank's birthday present, they get distracted the way back causing them to lose the watch and they have to try and get it back in time for the surprise party. Meanwhile, Nora, Billy, and Barb try to stall and trick Hank into excruciating ambitions. Guest stars: J.P. Manoux (Mr. Hollister), Tanner Stine, Brooke Sorenson, Krista Marie Yu
39	19	"It's Not What You Link"	Timothy Ryder	Story by : Sona Panos; Teleplay by : Lisa Muse Bryant	March 5, 2015	221	1.71
Phoebe becomes worried that her brother Max can never get along with her boyfriend, Link. So, she tries to set them up and tricks them into playing basketball together. Max is reluctant but when he sees Link using his superpowers to cheat on the game, he likes hanging out with him. When they start spending too much time together, Phoebe gets concerned Max will turn Link evil. She gets even more paranoid after hearing Max inviting Link to his "evil brotherhood" and asking him to keep it a secret from Phoebe. Phoebe follows Max secretly and finds him with a group of kids planning how to use the ring of suffering to destroy their enemies. Phoebe attacks them only to realize that they were playing a live action role play game. Guest star: Barrett Carnahan
40	20	"Cape Fear"	Robbie Countryman	Wesley Jermaine Johnson & Scott Taylor	March 9, 2015	222	1.45
While attending a roof party with Max, Phoebe saves a boy from falling off a ladder. After Hank and Barb question Phoebe, Max takes the blame in order to keep Phoebe's reputation so that she will be valid for being awarded the last cape of the year and Max will get a share in Phoebe's weapons. However, when Max is honored as the new superhero, Max begins to turn into a good person. Meanwhile, when Nora and Billy attempt to break Hank's record for the amount of time staying in the wilderness, Hank tries to sabotage their goals. Guest star: Daniele Gaither
41	21	"Call of Lunch Duty"	Trevor Kirschner	Dan Serafin	March 10, 2015	223	1.32
When Max confesses to Phoebe that he is the culprit of deliberately embarrassing Principal Bradford, she promises to protect his identity, causing her to become lunch lady at the school after being suspected of lying. Meanwhile, Nora and Billy believe that Mrs. Wong is an alien after watching an alien documentary. Guest stars: Jeff Meacham, Helen Hong, Kenny Ridwan, Reign Edwards (Winnie Lee), Scott Beehner (wrestling announcer)
42	22	"One Hit Thunder"	Shannon Flynn	Sean W. Cunningham & Marc Dworkin	March 11, 2015	224	1.44
Max's Band wants to audition for a chance to perform every Saturday at Splatburger but they have trouble coming with good lyrics for a new song. So, Max sneaks into Phoebe's bedroom to steal her diary for lyrics ideas. He finds an entry about Link's bonus toe which Phoebe had promised Link to never tell a soul about it. Max uses it for lyrics inspiration. The band uses the song for audition at Splatburger and they get the gig. Link, who is now working at Splatburger, hears the song and concludes that Phoebe told Max the secret. He breaks up with Phoebe without telling her why. Phoebe goes into depression trying to figure out why Link broke up with her. At first, Max continues to read more of Phoebe's diary entries for song inspirations but later realizes that Phoebe is really broken. So, he blows up a performance at Splatburger and admits that he's the one who broke Link's trust. Phoebe and Link get back together. Max Band gets kicked out of Splatburger. Guest stars: Audrey Whitby, Barrett Carnahan, Tanner Stine, Kenny Ridwan, Rob Ramsay
43	23	"The Girl with the Dragon Snafu"	Eric Dean Seaton	David Hoge & Dan Cross	March 25, 2015	225	1.60
When Phoebe's class is assigned to do a group project on China, she must choose between her friends or the popular group. Max wants to be in a group of nerds so that he won't have to do any work. At the same time, because Phoebe's group want to get a C but Phoebe wants to get an A, she has problems convincing them to do the project, but the girls are uncertain. Meanwhile, Nora and Billy challenge Hank and Barb to a challenge to see who can do house chores better.
44	24	"A Hero Is Born"	Jonathan Judge	Jed Spingarn and Dan Serafin	March 28, 2015	218–219	2.18
Phoebe and Cherry's friendship is tested when the Thundermans receive news that Barb is pregnant with a fifth child, who is later named Chloe. At the same time, Hank enlists Nora and Billy to buy baby essentials at the baby store, where Nora insists on participating at the cutest baby competition at store. Meanwhile, Max turns Dr. Colosso back into a human and accompanies him to receive an award from the Villain League, but it turns out that the villains King Crab, Lady Web, and Scalestro want to remove him from the Villain League due to his inactivity in the form of a rabbit. Dr. Colosso betrays Max and Max's life is on the line. However, Phoebe saves him with help from Cherry, who watches, when she tickles Chloe and causes her to release bubbles, and Max defeats the Supervillain League. Meanwhile, Nora starts to feel underappreciated upon thinking she won't be seen as the cutest one of the family following Chloe's birth. While at the baby store, Nora sees a sign for a baby contest the store is hosting and has Billy disguise her as a baby and sneak her into the competition. Although her skills were outrageous, Nora still does not win the contest because she doesn't have a birth certificate from that year, and she ends up getting banned from the store in return. Billy reassures Nora afterward that she's still cute in his opinion. Guest stars: Audrey Whitby, Dana Snyder (Dr. Colosso), Helen Hong, Alec Mapa (Cutest Baby judge) Note: This is a double-length special episode.

=== Season 3 (2015–16) ===
No. overall	No. in season	Title	Directed by	Written by	Original release date	Prod. code	U.S. viewers (millions)
45	1	"Phoebe vs. Max: The Sequel"	Eric Dean Seaton	Sean W. Cunningham & Marc Dworkin	June 27, 2015	302	2.42
After saving Max from King Crab, Lady Web, and Scalestro in the last episode, Phoebe earns her superhero cape and starts bragging about how she saved Max. The Hero League gives Phoebe an assignment, which is to protect her city Hiddenville, but the only bad guy she has to watch out for is her brother Max. Meanwhile, Billy gets an illness after not taking an important bug, and as Chloe has her final growth spurt, everybody is eager to find out what her new permanent superpower is, which are narrowed down to teleportation, super strength, or sonic screaming. Guest stars: Maya Le Clark, Audrey Whitby, Rizwan Manji (Dr. Ouch) Note: There are three endings to this episode. The first ending, used by Nickelodeon, shows Billy afraid to take the super bug, with Chloe teleporting to Billy and comforting him. The second ending shows Billy needing to open a pickle jar and asking Hank to open it, after which Chloe opens it with her sonic screaming. The third ending shows Hank and Chloe arm wrestling, with Chloe breaking the table underneath with her super strength, but blaming Hank for the mishap.
46	2	"On the Straight and Arrow"	Shannon Flynn	David Hoge & Dan Cross	July 11, 2015	301	1.41
Cherry is taking advantage of Phoebe's powers and Phoebe decides to stop letting Cherry use her powers for stupid things, so Max decides to use his powers to help Cherry. Meanwhile, Hank and Barb are having trouble with Chloe's teleportation and get tired, thinking that it's the weekend when it isn't, so Nora and Billy play along, but later try to gets things back to normal. Guest stars: Maya Le Clark, Audrey Whitby, Jeff Meacham, Tanner Stine, Kenny Ridwan, Jake Borelli (Wolfgang)
47	3	"Why You Buggin'?"	Eric Dean Seaton	Teleplay by : Jed Spingarn; Story by : Jed Spingarn & Barrett Carnahan	July 18, 2015	303	1.59
Phoebe is excited to meet Quinn, Link's best friend from Metroburg. She thinks Quinn is a boy but is shocked to find out that Quinn is a girl. She learns that Quinn is the daughter of bug villains that Hank and Barb defeated. Link insists that Quinn is not a villain like her parents and that she doesn't even have bug powers. When left alone with Phoebe, Quinn makes it clear that she likes Link and will do anything she can to get rid of Phoebe. This worries Phoebe but she fails to tell Link because Link wants her to get along with Quinn. Phoebe tricks Max into joining her, Link and Quinn for a double date so that Max can get Quinn to act mean to Phoebe in front of Link. Max instead falls for Quinn and tries to get her to date him but she just wants Link. During the double-date, Quinn and Phoebe keep fighting until Phoebe can't take anymore. Phoebe brings mangoes to Quinn since bug villains can't resist mangoes. Quinn morphs into a bug, making Phoebe realize that she is still a bug villain. Phoebe arrests Quinn and reports her to the Hero League, and Link apologizes for not believing her. Meanwhile, Billy and Nora are excited at being roommates when Hank and Barb move Chloe into Billy's old room, but Chloe is afraid of sleeping alone and the twins hear noises at night, thinking there's a monster. When the parents don't believe them, they set up a trap and the noises turn out to be coming from Chloe's stuffed toy, revealing she had been teleporting under their beds because of her fear. Chloe decides to sleep with Hank and Barb for a while longer while the twins keep their shared room. Guest stars: Maya Le Clark, Barrett Carnahan, Madison Lawlor (Quinn)
48	4	"Exit Stage Theft"	Robbie Countryman	Lisa Muse Bryant	July 25, 2015	304	1.46
When Cherry's laptop gets stolen, Phoebe offers to help look for it. Meanwhile, Max ditches his band after getting advice from Dr. Colosso to look for more shady characters to hang out with in order to get material for his evil chronicle. He notices a group of girls holding Cherry's laptop. He joins the gang and starts protecting the bad girls from Phoebe. Max and the bad girls sneak into the school talent show for their next heist. Max helps them steal his band's equipment. He finds a new guitar strap and a note from Oyster, Wolfgang and Gideon which makes him realize that he cares about them too. However, when he tries to stop the girls from stealing the equipment, they beat him up and leave him on the floor. Phoebe and Cherry suspect that the thief will be at the school talent show. So, they try to get in by pretending to perform a magic show but Principal Bradford refuses to let them in. Phoebe enters backstage through the ceiling and finds Max having been beaten up by the girls. She helps Max up and they go after the girls together. After a huge, awkward fight, the twins defeat the bad girls and bring back Cherry's laptop. Max rejoins his friends in the band. Guest stars: Maya Le Clark, Audrey Whitby, Jeff Meacham, Tanner Stine, Kenny Ridwan, Jake Borelli, Ariela Barer (Kylie), Shauna Case (Harley), Michelle DeFraites (Jade)
49	5	"Are You Afraid of the Park?"	Robbie Countryman	Dan Serafin	September 30, 2015	305	1.74
Now that Nora is tall enough, she feels ready to go to Thunder Man the Ride and the whole family is excited to go for the ride - except Max and Phoebe. The Thunder Twins are afraid of the ride because it was very scary the first time they rode it. However, they don't want anyone finding out that they are scared. So, they agree to sabotage it. On their way to the park, they use telekinesis to trick Nora and Billy into fighting. In the chaos, Nora zaps Hank's limited edition hat, which angers him so much that he cancels the trip. The twins celebrate their victory but it soon becomes a problem when Nora and Billy's fights start affecting them. Nora forces Phoebe to play laser tag with her; and Billy makes Max think for him. The twins try to fix Billy and Nora but it proves impossible. After realizing that Chloe can teleport with other people, Max and Phoebe get her to teleport Nora and Billy to the ride. The twins tell Billy and Nora the truth and apologize for ruining their date. Nora and Billy quickly come up with an idea to trap Max and Phoebe into riding the Thunder Man the Ride twenty times. Since the ride is very scary, they agree not to ride it. Meanwhile, Colosso starts up his own cereal, Coloss-O's, which turns out to be high in sugar and cause people's teeth to fall out. Guest star: Maya Le Clark
50	6	"Evil Never Sleeps"	Sean Mulcahy	Anthony Q. Farrell	October 7, 2015	306	1.40
Evilman is up to something at his mattress store and Phoebe has to figure out what, even if it messes with her and Link's relationship. Max gets a job at the store as well, hoping to learn evil things from Evil Man. Meanwhile, Nora and Billy try to change how Chloe dresses. Later, Phoebe realizes it was a test to determine whether Phoebe was capable of becoming a full superhero. Guest stars: Eric Allan Kramer, Maya Le Clark, Audrey Whitby, Barrett Carnahan, Daniele Gaither
51	7	"Doppel-Gamers"	Jonathan Judge	Wesley Jermaine Johnson & Scott Taylor	October 14, 2015	308	1.46
Max and Phoebe are unable to defeat a video game villain on a video game developed by Cybron James, whose villains are impossible to beat. Meanwhile, Nora and Billy want to play the game and spend time with the twins but the twins push them away. The twins get tickets to GamerFest where Cybron James will be launching his new video game, but they're forced to take Billy and Nora with them. So, the Thunder Twins ditch their little siblings at GamerFest. Nora and Billy are taken by twins Matt and Fefe, doppelgangers of Max and Phoebe. Meanwhile, Phoebe and Max are unable to get inside to talk to Cybron because they need to have a kid under 13. Nora and Billy get the wristbands for Fefe and Matt instead. The twins disguise themselves as employees in order to get inside. Mistaking Phoebe for an employee, Fefe and Matt reveal their plans to trick Nora and Billy into playing a rigged, live action version of Cybron's new game, Spitballs. While Max is pitching his video game character to Cybron, he discovers that Cybron wants to humiliate Nora and Billy in the game. So, Max goes to help Phoebe save the kids and defeat the Spitballs game. Phoebe and Max apologize for ditching Billy and Nora and promise to spare more time for them. Guest stars: Maya Le Clark, Audrey Whitby, Tanner Stine, Alex Staggs (Cybron James), Shanna Strong (Fifi), Sam Cohen (Matt)
52	8	"Floral Support"	Timothy Ryder	Sean W. Cunningham & Marc Dworkin	October 21, 2015	309	1.25
Principal Bradford confiscates Max's evil chronicle just before Max's chronicle review with Dark Mayhem. On the way to his office, Bradford runs into Allison and the Green Teens club protecting a stink plant during its blooming season. After the confrontation, Bradford decides to cut down the plant. Allison asks Phoebe, Max and Cherry to join Green Teens to help protect the club. Max refuses to join the club but Dr. Colosso advises him to join the club in order to use their keys to get into the Principal's office and steal his chronicle back. After joining the club, Max gives them the idea to get enough signatures to help stop Bradford. When Phoebe and Max go to photocopy the signatures, Max steals the diary back and ditches Phoebe. Phoebe is busted by Principal Bradford who blames her and the Green Teens Club for giving Max access to his office. Bradford bans the club, making Phoebe very mad at Max. During the chronicle review, Max feels guilty for hurting Phoebe. So, he walks out on him and goes to help Phoebe and Green Teens Club to stop Bradford from destroying the tree. Phoebe thanks Max for saving them and says it will take time to forgive him. Back at home, Dark Mayhem tells Dr. Colosso that he's impressed by Max because he had the guts to walk out on him. Guest stars: Ryan Newman, Maya Le Clark, Audrey Whitby, Jeff Meacham
53	9	"Patch Me If You Can"	Trevor Kirschner	Chase Heinrich & Micah Steinberg	October 28, 2015	310	1.33
Phoebe decides to babysit Link's brother, Harris, so Link can get his surprise birthday party ready for him. Phoebe and Max run into a problem when Link's brother wears Max's evil eye patch and need to get him back to normal. Meanwhile, Nora almost hits Chloe when she is doing trick shots and is afraid to use her powers. But she regains the courage to use it again when she defeats Harris. Guest stars: Maya Le Clark, Barrett Carnahan, Casey Simpson (Harris)
54	10	"Give Me a Break-Up" "Gimme a Break-Up"	Leonard R. Garner, Jr.	Dicky Murphy	November 4, 2015	307	1.73
Phoebe is sick of hanging out with Link all the time and tries to find him a hobby. They finally find him being a superhero and is happy. However, Link is sent somewhere else and Phoebe doesn't want Link to go, so she tries to have one final night to hopefully change his mind. Meanwhile, Max needs Nora and Billy to help him make chili better than Mrs. Wong's chili on a TV show cook off. Guest stars: Maya Le Clark, Audrey Whitby, Barrett Carnahan, Daniele Gaither, Helen Hong, Mark DeCarlo (Chili D. Williams)
55	11	"No Country for Old Mentors"	Trevor Kirschner	David Hoge & Dan Cross	November 11, 2015	312	1.83
Phoebe gets to work with a superhero to get her into full training. Hank thought that he was working with Phoebe even though Phoebe wanted to work with another hero. Meanwhile, when Nora and Billy keep losing their stuff and Barb doesn't replace them with new ones, they decide to return the favor by hiding her stuff. Guest stars: Carlos PenaVega (Tech Rider), Maya Le Clark, Daniele Gaither
56	12	"Date Expectations"	Carl Lauten	Anthony Q. Farrell & Dicky Murphy	November 18, 2015	311	1.61
Phoebe distracts Max from interfering with her class project by convincing him that a girl at school wants to date him. Meanwhile, when Cousin Blobbin is chosen to babysit Billy, Nora and Chloe while Hank and Barb go out to dinner, a jealous Dr. Colosso tries to frame Cousin Blobbin for sending Chloe to space. Guest stars: Ryan Newman, Maya Le Clark, Audrey Whitby, Tanner Stine, Kenny Ridwan, Jake Borelli, Harvey Guillen, Teala Dunn, Rebecca Metz (Mrs. Austin)
57	13	"He Got Game Night"	Jonathan Judge	Lisa Muse Bryant	February 13, 2016	315	1.65
Hank and Barb take game night to the next level, as it is Chloe's first game night. Max then invites Allison over to be his game partner over Phoebe. When everyone meets Allison, they assume that she is Max's girlfriend, but Max says she isn't, while Allison thought they were dating and runs out of the house. The game wheel lands on "new car" and Hank and Barb have to promise whoever wins a new car. After, Max goes out to comfort Allison and says that they are officially a couple. He goes into the house and the family sees that they made up after he kisses her on the cheek. They play the game, but it turns out that all the teams cheated except for Hank and Barb who now don't have to promise the kids a new car. Guest stars: Ryan Newman, Maya Le Clark, Dana Snyder
58	14	"Kiss Me Nate"	Leonard R. Garner, Jr.	Wesley Jermaine Johnson & Scott Taylor	April 2, 2016	316	1.56
Max gets insecure when he finds out that Allison is auditioning for the lead female role in a school play because the lead actor, Nate always falls for the leading female co-star. So, Phoebe and Max come up with a plan to make sure that Allison doesn't get the role. Phoebe auditions for the lead role and gets it by mistake. Allison gets Angel Number 3, but to Max's disappointment, it turns out that the angel kisses Nate's character. Max and Phoebe decide to sabotage the play and make sure Allison doesn't kiss Nate. However, after suspecting that Max is up to something, Allison assures him that she loves him and him alone and that the kiss in the play will not change that. This gives Max the strength he needs throughout the kiss scene. Guest stars: Ryan Newman, Maya Le Clark, Tanner Stine, Gabrielle Elyse, Camille Manning Hyde (Roxy), Adam Kulbersh (Mr. Schecter), Thomas Archer (Nate Lockhart)
59	15	"Dog Day After-School"	Jonathan Judge	Anthony Q. Farrell	June 4, 2016	318	1.66
When Nora and Billy get their mom's tablet confiscated by their teacher, they enlist Phoebe and Max to help them get the tablet back without their parents finding out. Phoebe uses The Animalizer to turn Cousin Blobbin's dog into a woman, pretending to be their mom. However, things go awry when they feed her meat. Guest stars: Maya Le Clark, Helen Hong, Harvey Guillen, Nicole Sullivan, Shane Blades, Bechir Sylvain
60	16	"Original Prankster"	Trevor Kirschner	Dan Serafin	June 11, 2016	321	1.45
After being told that she can't be with a guy who hurts people just for laughs, Max promises Allison that he will quit pranking. He later finds out that quitting pranking was easier said than done and ends up pranking Principal Bradford. Meanwhile, Phoebe tries to be nice to Mrs. Wong by fixing her fence, and Mrs. Wong returns the favour when she invites the Thundermans to her party. And at Hiddenville high, Wolfgang a German exchange student is being expelled after he gets blamed for Max's prank and Max tries to protect his friend from Principal Bradford by hiding him in his Lair, but their cover gets blown when Dr. Colosso tips off Bradford. At the party, Phoebe, Billy, Nora and Chloe turn the tables on Mrs. Wong after discovering that the party was a set up. Despite being furious with his actions, Allison tries to stop Max from confessing about the prank and allows him to prank Principal Bradford once more after overhearing him insulting her bike. Then Bradford tells Max, Allison and Wolfgang that he won't be expelling Wolfgang anymore, because the school gets a monthly benefit for every exchange student enrolled. Guest stars: Ryan Newman, Maya Le Clark, Jeff Meacham, Helen Hong, Tanner Stine, Jake Borelli, Elijah Nelson
61	17	"Chutes and Splatters"	Trevor Kirschner	Lisa Muse Bryant	June 25, 2016	323	1.59
Phoebe must babysit President Kickbutt's daughter as her latest superhero assignment, and things are starting to get bad after Phoebe takes President Kickbutt's daughter to Splatburger. Meanwhile, Nora and Billy want a pet, so Hank and Barb tell them to take care of Dr. Colosso to prove that they can take care of a pet, but later Nora and Billy decide they do not want a pet. Guest stars: Maya Le Clark, Daniele Gaither, Tanner Stine, Jake Borelli, Kenny Ridwan, Genneya Walton (Simone Kickbutt)
62	18	"I'm Gonna Forget You, Sucka"	Robbie Countryman	David Hoge & Dan Cross	July 9, 2016	317	1.41
When Cherry and Phoebe post a selfie online exposing the Thundermans' superhero family portrait and almost expose the family's secret, the Hero league find out and ban Phoebe from being friends with Cherry, much to her dismay. When Phoebe refuses, Evan, who is revealed to be a secret agent for the league, decides to take Cherry into custody and erase her memory. Phoebe follows Evan and after a battle, she learns the league is only going to erase Cherry's phone's memory because she kept posting about the Thundermans' true identity. Kickbutt allows Phoebe and Cherry to remain friends, and Evan is revealed to be a 50-year old man named Lucius who doesn't age, who gets kicked out of the league after his cover was blown. Guest stars: Maya Le Clark, Audrey Whitby, Elijah Nelson, Daniele Gaither, Gabrielle Elyse, Camille Manning Hyde, Max Jimenez (Owen)
63	19	"Beat the Parents"	Jonathan Judge	Teleplay by : Lisa Muse Bryant; Story by : Nora Sullivan	July 16, 2016	326	1.51
Allison's parents force Max to meet them, but Max must prevent himself from saying anything disrespectful to adults despite his cold-hearted nature. So, he brings Phoebe to Allison's parents's grand MA gym opening to help him impress them. However, when Phoebe ruins their whole opening, Allison's parents force Max and Allison to break up. To get the two back together, Phoebe convinces Allison's parents to work at the gym in exchange. Meanwhile, Billy and Nora are bored with watching Chloe's favorite children's show, Cutesy Cow, so they present a show called Hooty the Owl which stars an owl who goes by his own rules. But the owl turns out to be disobedient and destructive, and soon Chloe begins to pick up Hooty's behavior and acts just like him. Guest stars: Ryan Newman, Maya Le Clark, Chris Jericho (Gary), Cate Cohen (Debbie)
64	20	"Can't Spy Me Love"	Eric Dean Seaton	Dicky Murphy	July 23, 2016	322	1.54
Phoebe and Cherry are eating at Splatburger where Phoebe meets a cute boy with many things alike with her. However, when he leaves and she realizes she likes him, she uses the Hero League's system to find him and suffers consequences while Max uses Nora and Billy to help him make money for a hoverboard by being a group of ninjas for a birthday party. Guest stars: Maya Le Clark, Audrey Whitby, Daniele Gaither, Lucas Adams (the cute boy)
65	21	"Robin Hood: Prince of Pheebs"	Jonathan Judge	Chris Atwood	July 30, 2016	325	1.71
Hank and Barb go out on a date night while Phoebe babysits Chloe. Phoebe is about to tell Chloe the story of Robin Hood, when Max appears and Chloe says he is her favorite, so Phoebe decides to tell her a different story, where Sheriff Maxingham steals things from people, including Chloe the Cute's golden slippers. Phoebe Hood tries to get them back, together with her merry crew – Barb Marian, Little Hank, Friar Billy and Beyoncé (Nora). The sheriff's men run away, and Phoebe Hood and her merry crew give everyone back their things, but they cannot find Chloe's slippers, because they were stolen by Maxingham, who returns to King Colosso with no money. He uses the golden slippers to lure Phoebe Hood, and they capture her. Phoebe becomes Chloe's new favorite, and when Max comes back, she teleports him to the North Pole, so Phoebe tells her an ending of the story where Maxingham turns against the king and joins Phoebe Hood's merry crew. Chloe teleports him back and Phoebe uses her heat breath to unfreeze him. Then their parents come home from the date night with ice cream, which Max throws out of their hands with his telekinesis. Guest stars: Maya Le Clark, Audrey Whitby, Tanner Stine, Jake Borelli
66	22	"Aunt Misbehavin' "	Jonathan Judge	Sean W. Cunningham & Marc Dworkin	August 6, 2016	319	1.44
It's Barb's birthday but Max and Phoebe keep fighting because Phoebe ruined Max's Band's gig by throwing a party. Barb asks them to get along as a gift for her birthday. The twins refuse to do that but instead agree to track down their Aunt Mandy from Metroburg to attend Barb's birthday. To their surprise, they discover that Aunt Mandy and her sister, Barb haven't been in speaking terms for years. A fight breaks between Mandy and the Thundermans. Mandy blames Barb for bailing on their band performance when she counted on her to be there. Max sides with Mandy against the Thundermans emphasizing how disappointing it is when your sister doesn't show up to something that matters to you. This makes Phoebe realize that Max was only mad because she didn't show up for his band performance. She gets the rest of the family to make it up to Aunt Mandy and Max. Guest stars: Maya Le Clark, Tanner Stine, Jake Borelli, Kenny Ridwan, Paula Christensen (Mandy), Ashlee Füss (Deena)
67	23	"Stealing Home"	Eric Dean Seaton	Sean W. Cunningham & Marc Dworkin	August 13, 2016	324	1.48
Phoebe and Hank lie to Barb about spending time alone for superhero training session but instead use the time to go see a movie. On returning from their movie, they're shocked to find all the furniture in the house stolen. Max reveals that he's hidden the furniture and takes the opportunity to blackmail Hank and Phoebe into becoming his personal servants or else he will tell Barb they lied. When Max finally goes to show them where he hid the furniture, they're all shocked to find the furniture gone. Max figures out that Chainsaw must have taken the furniture by mistake after helping to hide it. They go to Chainsaw's Game of Scones coffee house and are forced to play Chainsaw and his daughter in order to win the furniture back. Guest stars: Maya Le Clark, Helen Hong, Adrian Gonzalez (Raul)
68	24	"Back to School"	Robbie Countryman	Jed Spingarn	August 13, 2016	320	1.66
Super President Kickbutt forces Phoebe and Max to go back to fifth grade at the Secret Academy of Superpower Studies to retake their power assessment tests in Mr. Silver Eagle's class, and failure to pass the test results in Phoebe being disqualified as a superhero and Max going to junior jail for hacking the school's computers to do an authorized day off which was why Phoebe and Max missed a day of school. Mr. Silver Eagle's assistant Leonard is left in charge after Mr. Silver Eagle has an accident and is determined to make Phoebe and Max fail as revenge against Max for pranking him back in middle school and makes it almost impossible for them to pass. In the final test, he exposes them to dangerous lasers, but when he gets stuck on a magnetized logo, the twins forfeit the test to save him. When Mr. Silver Eagle returns, he's impressed with Phoebe and Max and tells them that they've passed the test while reassigning Leonard to work with the third-graders for his actions. Meanwhile, Nora is unhappy with Hank for unfairly assigning chores and refusing to listen to her and Billy, so Nora challenges him by calling for an election. She ends up getting the most votes, but gives her vote to Hank after he promises to listen more. Guest stars: Maya Le Clark, Daniele Gaither, Matt Corboy (Mr. Silver Eagle), Dawson Fletcher (Leonard), Saylor Bell (Jocelyn), Jacob Buster (Chester), KylieRae Condon (Keely), Issac Ryan Brown (Rodney)
69	25	"Thundermans: Secret Revealed"	Jonathan Judge	Jed Spingarn and Dan Serafin	October 10, 2016	313–314	2.43
When Max gets a call from Dark Mayhem, he is eager to finally meet him. Besides Max meeting Fairy Pinch-ess, Son of Scalestro, and Strongdor, Dark Mayhem has a task for Max which is to take Thunder Girl's powers away with a special orb following Phoebe stopping Lady Web's museum robbery. Phoebe discovers about Max's involvement with Dark Mayhem and, after a struggle ensues, accidentally takes away Max's powers. Max is then grounded for life and locked up in his lair until further notice; however, Colosso is able to break through and free Max and then gives him back the orb, which Max uses to take the family's powers, and he then locks up his family inside before heading off to the prom where Phoebe is. Meanwhile, Mrs. Wong plans to expose the Thundermans after she notices Phoebe's superhero costume in her bag, which is quickly encircled by the news once she announces it. Max arrives at the prom, about to take Phoebe's powers, and Dark Mayhem arrives as well, waiting for Max to take her powers. However, after Phoebe explains to Max how much would happen if Dark Mayhem were to take over, Max finally relents and gives everyone back their powers, but they don't receive their proper powers. A fierce battle then ensues between the Thundermans and Dark Mayhem and his squad which ends up with Max taking Dark Mayhem's powers. Later, Super President Kickbutt officially proclaims Max as a superhero. Guest stars: Ryan Newman, Maya Le Clark, Audrey Whitby, Helen Hong, Barrett Carnahan, Tanner Stine, Kenny Ridwan, Jake Borelli, Gabrielle Elyse, Jeff Meacham, Camille Manning Hyde, Daniele Gaither Note: This is a double-length special episode. Additionally, an alternate ending was shown after a rerun on October 15, 2016, which features Super President Kickbutt announcing the new protectors of Hiddenville: The Thundermans. Most importantly, she promotes the addition of Phoebe and Max as "The Thunder Twins", causing an argument to break out between them on who would be whose sidekick.

=== Season 4 (2016–18) ===
- On May 22, 2018, Nickelodeon aired a five-minute preview of the final four episodes titled "The Final Four Preview".

No. overall	No. in season	Title	Directed by	Written by	Original release date	Prod. code	U.S. viewers (millions)
70	1	"Happy Heroween"	Eric Dean Seaton	Wesley Jermaine Johnson & Scott Taylor	October 22, 2016	405	1.96
When a huge storm makes it impossible for the Thundermans to go out for Halloween and causes the house to lose power, Dr. Colosso offers to tell them spooky stories to scare them off. In the first story, Billy and Nora are turned into candy by a troll for stealing candy; and Hank eats them thinking they're candy. The second story is about a family of monsters called "Monstermans." The Monstermans had moved to Humanville to live a normal life. But one day, they go to Splatburger for a Halloween party and get exposed as monsters. Everyone turns against them for being monsters. In the third story, "Phoebe the Vampire Slayer," Phoebe and Cherry realize that Max is a vampire and try to run away from him by going to school. However, at school, they realize that Max is turning a lot of the other students into vampires as well. To save themselves and the other students, Cherry and Phoebe must slay the original vampire. They think it's Max but it turns out that Dr. Colosso is the original vampire. Colosso's spooky stories scare everyone to bed except Phoebe and Max. Guest stars: Audrey Whitby, Helen Hong
71	2	"Thundermans: Banished!"	Jonathan Judge	Jed Spingarn and Dan Serafin	November 19, 2016	403–404	2.37
Due to Hank and Barbara's show-off after the identities of the families are revealed and Phoebe and Max accidentally causing Mrs. Wong's restaurant to get destroyed, Super President Kickbutt uses a wheel to decide where the Thundermans should be reassigned. After a long spin caused by Hank Thunderman, it lands on Antarctica as the Thundermans are sent there with Super President Kickbutt telling them that they will be depowered if they ever return. In their place, the Falconman family is placed there. Due to Candi Falconman's evil plot to make everyone like her, Phoebe and Max risk returning to stop her plot. Afterwards, the rest of the Thundermans and Super President Kickbutt and her workers arrive where Phoebe had to explain their motives behind disobeying Super President Kickbutt's warning. After a public power-removal, it turns out afterwards that the Thundermans still have their powers. Super President Kickbutt stated that she faked their depowering to fool the civilians and advises they be more careful from now on. Cherry is then seen to be exiting the bathroom and reveals that she heard everything and still knows the Thundermans have superpowers. Guest stars: Ryan Newman, Audrey Whitby, Tanner Stine, Helen Hong, Daniele Gaither, Jake Borelli, Gabrielle Elyse, Jada Facer (Candi Falconman), JoJo Siwa (Nora's fan) Note: This is a double-length special episode.
72	3	"Smells Like Team Spirit"	Eric Dean Seaton	Sean W. Cunningham & Marc Dworkin	January 7, 2017	402	1.84
Phoebe and Max are officially starting their Z-Force training but their efforts are jeopardized by their inability to work together as a team. Max feels like Phoebe is too controlling because of her tight training schedule while Phoebe feels like Max is too selfish and doesn't give Z-Force training the attention it deserves. It gets worse when Phoebe realizes that Max spent their Z-Force equipment money to buy a treehouse team headquarters without consulting Phoebe. Barb and Hank try to help the twins by taking them through a series of team-building activities but it doesn't work out. Barb and Hank convince Phoebe that she is controlling and so she goes to apologize to Max in the treehouse. This only leads to another fight causing the tree house to fall. Before hitting the ground, the Thunder Twins save one another with telekinesis, make them realize that they do in fact care about each other. They agree to try harder to work together.
73	4	"Max to the Future"	Trevor Kirschner	Dicky Murphy	January 14, 2017	406	1.82
While submitting their team's special skills to the Z-Force, Max realizes that Phoebe is only planning to submit her skills and so he feels left out because he wants to contribute too. He asks Phoebe to include "gadgets" as his special skills but Phoebe mocks him because most of his past gadgets failed. So, Max spends all night creating a gadget called CrimeCaster that can predict crimes before they happen. Since Max doesn't believe in his own creation, he gets advice from Colosso to fake the crimes. This impresses Phoebe and she agrees to add gadgets to the list. Phoebe is disappointed when she learns that Max has been faking the crimes. But it turns out that the gadget still worked after all. The Twins officially include gadgets as one of their skills. Guest stars: Hunter Stiebel, Nick Gomez, David Mattey
74	5	"Better Off Wed"	Lynn McCracken	Jeny Quine	January 21, 2017	407	1.87
While preparing wedding anniversary gifts for their parents, the Thundermans kids realize that they've never really seen any wedding photos from their parents. Hank then tells them about the story of how Dr. Colosso ruined their wedding by turning them into goats with the Animalizer. Hero League later found a way to turn Hank and Barb back to humans and after that Hank went after Colosso and used his animalizer invention to turn him into a bunny. After hearing the story, Phoebe tells her siblings to recreate Hank and Barb's wedding to renew their vows as the anniversary present. However, Dr. Colosso learns about the plans and finds a way to get to the animalizer, turning himself human. During a mock wedding, Dr. Colosso shows up and turns Max, Phoebe, Billy and Nora into animals. Barb and Hank arrive later and defeat him. Guest star: Dana Snyder
75	6	"Parks & T-Rex"	Leonard R. Garner Jr.	Genna Ryan	January 28, 2017	409	1.72
After missing Chloe's pre-school graduation, Phoebe and Max realize that they've been spending so much time together training for Z-Force and not enough time with their family. So, Phoebe offers to make it up to them with a Phoebe Fun Night where she'd take them to the park. The park is closed but luckily Phoebe finds the guard's key and steals them. The Thundermans enjoy playing at different places in the park including mini-golf, without realizing that they're there illegally. Hank causes the malfunctioning mini-golf dinosaur to start breathing fire, just before the family is busted by the guards. They work quickly to save the guards without using their powers. Phoebe admitted that she lied about the park being reserved for them, just to spend time with them. Phoebe is banned from the parks for life. Meanwhile, Dr. Colosso tricks Max into spending time with him by pretending that he is sick, suffering from Bunny Fever which is caused by loneliness and neglect. When Max finds out from the pet doctor that Colosso is lying and confronts him about it, Colosso admits that he misses Max. Max promises to spend more time with him. Guest stars: Enn Reitel, Kirstin Eggers
76	7	"Date of Emergency"	Eric Dean Seaton	Lisa Muse Bryant	February 4, 2017	401	1.72
When Cherry and Oyster announce that they are now a couple and plan on a double date with Max and Allison, Phoebe realizes that she's the fifth wheel. Feeling left out by her friends, she tries to get herself a boyfriend so that she can triple date with Choyster and Mallison at the Heart Tree. Most of the boys at Hiddenville High are scared of going to the Heart Tree because of the scary Farmer Ted. Phoebe needs to look for a boy desperate enough to date her - so, she settles for Gideon. He turns out to be allergic to a lot of things, causing Phoebe to be left behind with him. They both fall into one of Farmer Ted's traps. Max, worried about Phoebe goes back to check on her and finds them trapped. While trying to rescue them, he triggers other traps capturing him and Allison as well as Cherry and Oyster. Phoebe admits that she only asked Gideon out so that she isn't left out and Gideon admits that he only accepted because he wanted to get closer to Barb. Farmer Ted arrives and says that he just traps people so they can talk to him. Guest stars: Ryan Newman, Audrey Whitby, Kenny Ridwan, Tanner Stine, Harvey Guillen, Jim O'Heir
77	8	"Orange Is the New Max"	Trevor Kirschner	Keith Wagner	February 18, 2017	411	1.53
Super President Kickbutt assigns Max to Metroburg Prison in order to help set some young superpowered juveniles straight. Dr. Colosso convinces Phoebe that Max is going to turn back to evil after hanging out with those evil kids. This makes Phoebe paranoid and so she follows Max and tries to keep him in check. While talking to the kids, Max makes it sound as if being evil is fun which worries Phoebe further. She reminds Max and the kids that Max eventually turned good. She even give them pens to write down what they've learned but they use the pens to unlock their anti-power ankle bracelets; leading to a fight between the Thunder Twins and the villain kids. Max pretends to turn against Phoebe to gain the kids' trust but takes advantage of that to help stop them. Phoebe admits that she thought he would turn evil again but Max assures her that he was serious that he is no longer evil. Guest stars: Jackée Harry, Daniele Gaither, Isabella Marino, Kate Alberts, Kezii Curtis
78	9	"Ditch Perfect"	Trevor Kirschner	Chase Heinrich & Micah Steinberg	February 25, 2017	408	1.67
When Max misses a band practice due to Z-Force training, Phoebe and Cherry overhear his bandmates saying that they're going to kick Max out for not taking the band seriously. Phoebe feels responsible because her intense Z-Force training may have cost Max a spot on the band. So, she tries to help Max get accepted back into the band and it works out. It turns out that Max actually wanted to quit the band and was only missing the practice as part of his long term plan to be kicked out of the band. He tells Phoebe that he just wants to concentrate on Z-Force for now. So, Phoebe and Max work together to get Max kicked out of the band again by suggesting ridiculous ideas but it doesn't work out. Max even tries to force the band to accept Phoebe in, but they actually want her in. When all fail, Max tells his bandmates the truth. Oyster reveals that he was also planning to leave the band to. So was Gideon. With this mutual agreement, Max's Band breaks up and promise to remain friends. Guest stars: Audrey Whitby, Kenny Ridwan, Tanner Stine, Jake Borelli, Helen Hong, James Hong
79	10	"May Z-Force Be with You"	Robbie Countryman	Sean W. Cunningham & Marc Dworkin	March 4, 2017	410	1.59
Phoebe and Max prepare to be interviewed by the Z-Force interviewer D-Tail in order to see if they will make it to the finals of the Z-Force audition. When Phoebe goes to help Cherry at a ping-pong tournament, she is knocked down the school steps and breaks her neck; so, she and Max train Cherry take her place in the interview in disguise. Worried that Cherry might mess up, Phoebe dresses up as Cherry and joins the interview to help when needed. Cherry helps them pass the interview but when an emergency at the Proton Reactor needs both Phoebe and Max's powers, Max finds it impossible to save the day without Phoebe. Luckily, Phoebe gets Chloe to teleport her to Metroburg. Cherry helps distract the interviewer while Phoebe and Max save the proton reactor. The interviewer tells the Thunder Twins that they've passed the interview and he's recommending them for the final phase in the Z-Force recruitment. Cherry is pleased to have finally saved Phoebe in a way. Guest stars: Audrey Whitby, Helen Hong, Jeff Meacham, Gary Anthony Williams
80	11	"21 Dump Street"	Robbie Countryman	Lisa Muse Bryant	June 3, 2017	414	1.52
After three months volunteering with the Earth Corps, Allison chooses to continue her mission and breaks up with Max. This breakup sends Max into a state of depression, which starts to affect Max's health and superpowers. Phoebe tries to help him get over it by setting him up with Molly, the new head of the Green Teens who shares a lot of similarities with Allison. But when Molly comes over, she steals Dr. Colosso and takes him for pet adoption claiming that the Thundermans were mistreating the bunny. Dr. Colosso is adopted by Principal Bradford, forcing Phoebe and Max to work together to get Colosso back without Bradford finding out. After realizing that Bradford became miserable for failing to move on after his first breakup, Max gets the strength to get over Allison and move on. Meanwhile, Nora and Billy ask their parents to start training them to become superheroes. Hank starts training them at the lowest level but Nora is impatient, believing that she's better than that since they've taken down real villains before. She levels up the Hero League's Crime Buddy training robot to the highest level which causes the robot to start attacking them. Guest stars: Audrey Whitby, Jeff Meacham, Addyson Bell (Molly)
81	12	"Super Dupers"	Leonard R. Garner Jr.	Dicky Murphy	June 10, 2017	415	1.29
When Gideon reports Principal Bradford to the School Board for wearing inappropriate shorts to school, Bradford goes after Gideon. To boost Gideon's confidence to face Bradford, Phoebe gives him a fake bracelet and tells him that if he wears it, it will boost his strength. Max and Phoebe escalate things further when they continue to help Gideon by using telekinesis to save him, making him believe that he has superpowers. Gideon declares himself a superhero, "The Giddler," forcing the Thunder Twins to secretly follow him and save him from getting hurt. To get the bracelet back, Max & Phoebe dress up as villains and tip Gideon to meet them. After the bracelet is stolen back, Gideon gets the confidence to confront Bradford. Meanwhile, Nora accidentally zaps the Thunder Monitor with her lasers eyes while playing rock-paper-lasers with Billy. This causes the Thunder Monitor to malfunction. Dr. Colosso lies to them that he's fixed it but the Thunder Monitor continues to malfunction, activating random modes. When things get out of control, Nora admits what she did, helping Hank identify and fix the problem. Guest stars: Jeff Meacham, Kenny Ridwan
82	13	"Come What Mayhem"	Jonathan Judge	Sean W. Cunningham & Marc Dworkin	June 17, 2017	418	1.58
Thunder Man and Electress have been selected to receive the Platinum Cape Lifetime Award during the upcoming 75th Supe Awards for their superhero work. While, the rest of the family is excited Max is concerned because he had set a big stink bomb prank to go off during the awards. But now that he's good, he has to stop it because it would automatically get him and Phoebe disqualified for Z-Force. Phoebe is mad that she is still cleaning up Max's mess even when he's good. Max works to make a gadget that will generate an electro-plasma blast needed to disable the Thundertanium casing on the stink bomb. But Phoebe doesn't have faith in it and she wants to get Dark Mayhem's powers from the power-sapping orb but Max warns that the powers would turn anyone using them evil. Phoebe goes behind Max's back and absorbs the powers anyway. Just in case. During the Supe Awards, she uses the powers to disable the stink bomb even though Max's gadget could have worked as well. After returning home, Phoebe tries to return Dark Mayhem's powers into the orb. But the powers reject the orb and bounce right back into her body. The powers take control of her and her eyes glow red. She starts to turn evil. Guest stars: Daniele Gaither, Dominic Burgess, Matthew Harris
83	14	"Thunder in Paradise"	Jonathan Judge	Jed Spingarn and Dan Serafin	June 24, 2017	420–421	2.28
After absorbing Dark Mayhem's powers, Phoebe starts to have nightmares where she's evil and destroying the world. She tries to talk to Max about it but he is still disappointed by her. So, she goes to visit Dark Mayhem in Metroburg SuperJail to figure out how to get rid of his powers. But Dark Mayhem tells her to embrace the powers and continue his masterplan to take over the world. He tells her to go to a cave at the bottom of the Weeping Volcano in Hawaii to get Dark Mayhem's full plan. After talking to Dark Mayhem, she turns full-on evil. She tries to get Chloe to take her to Hawaii but the whole family decides to choose Hawaii for their vacation. During their time in Hawaii, Phoebe puts Billy in danger and runs off to look for the cave. Max figures out that something is wrong with her and follows her. Phoebe defeats Max using Dark Mayhem's powers forcing Max to go back to get his family as backup. At the cave Phoebe finds Destructo, Dark Mayhem's sidekick who gives her the plans on how to use Malvezium to spread it through the earth's atmosphere destroying all superpowers on the planet. Max, Billy and Nora try to stop her with the power sapping orb but she overpowers them and destroys the orb. She leaves them trapped in the cave and goes to Dark Mayhem's lair to complete the plan. Max and his siblings are rescued later by Hank and Barb. They follow Phoebe to Dark Mayhem's lair but she traps them inside a force-field, rendering them powerless as she waits for the volcano lava with Malvezium to erupt. With time running out, Max figures out a way to make the broken pieces of the orb work. With the help of Nora's heat vision and Barb's electrokinesis, Max manages to power the orb pieces and absorb Dark Mayhem's powers from Phoebe; saving her. Meanwhile, Destructo gets his body attached and decides to complete the plan. Hank fights to stop him while Max and Phoebe work together to freeze the boiling lava before it erupts. The Thunder Twins save the world and Phoebe apologizes to Max for not believing she needed him. Guest stars: Chris Grace, Piotr Michael, Matthew Harris Note: This is a double-length special episode.
84	15	"Save the Past Dance"	Robbie Countryman	Anthony Q. Farrell	November 18, 2017	427	1.34
Tired of hearing a legend about Heinrich Hiddenville III told by everyone, even their parents, the kids try to disprove the legend by using Cousin Blobbin's time machine to go back in time to 1955 to disprove the legend. After they arrive, they find out that the legend was actually true. However, they cause Heinrich to injure his leg, which results in him missing school. As a result, when they return to present day Hiddenville, they find out that they altered the past which caused disaster for their hometown. When they head off to school, they find out that four superheroes (Max, Phoebe, Billy and Nora), caused Heinrich to miss his dance contest and his hatred of superheroes drove him to a life of crime and he banned superheroes. Which is why their parents never moved there. So, in order to fix this, Max and Phoebe both decide to travel back in time and help keep Heinrich from missing his dance contest, with Phoebe being his dance partner. Next, Both Phoebe and Heinrich lose the contest. Finally, the kids all come back in Cousin Blobbin's time machine, only to find out that their parents are at home, which means after they helped Heinrich with his dance contest, everything in their hometown returned to normal. However, after their parents look at a picture about the story of Heinrich, everyone, including Cousin Blobbin, find out that the kids used the time machine. Guest stars: Audrey Whitby, Jeff Meacham, Helen Hong, Jake Borelli, Kenny Ridwan, Harvey Guillen, Owen Joyner (as Heinrich Hiddenville III)
85	16	"Z's All That"	Trevor Kirschner	Wesley Jermaine Johnson & Scott Taylor	January 6, 2018	417	1.15
Phoebe and Max choose Nora to be their Li'l Z trainee as part of Z'Force's Li'l Z Mentorship Program. However, after seeing Billy's skills, the twins agree to ditch Nora and choose Billy instead. They lie to Nora to avoid hurting her feelings. But when Nora finds out that they replaced her with Billy, she teams up with Dr. Colosso to prove her skills. Nora uses Dr. Colosso's special visors to boost her lasers. She goes to confront Max and Phoebe and tries to show off her powers. The visors are wonky, causing Nora's laser blast to destroy a lot of properties in addition to trapping the twins under a giant pizza sign. Phoebe and Max teach Nora how to produce a similar laser power without needing the visors. She uses it to save the twins. Max and Phoebe agree to train both Billy and Nora as their Li'l Z's. Meanwhile, when Hank refuses to keep his promise to Cousin Blobbin to be the face of Blobbin's embarrassing thunderwear, Chloe refuses to keep her promise to collect her toys too. So, Hank is forced to go through the embarrassment to show Chloe the important of keeping a promise. Guest star: Harvey Guillen
86	17	"Can't Hardly Date"	Jody Margolin Hahn	Dicky Murphy	January 13, 2018	430	1.35
Both Max and Phoebe are tired of Sarah and Gideon having obsessive crushes on them. So, they come up with a plan to set Sarah and Gideon up by tricking them into a meal at Splatburger. After a lot of effort, the plan works. Gideon and Sarah start dating. Phoebe is happy that she doesn't have to deal with Gideon anymore. However, when Sarah mentions that her uncle Mark McGrath (Sugar Ray), Max tries to win Sarah back so that he can meet Sugar Ray. Phoebe doesn't want Max to break up Gideon and Sarah because then Gideon would want to date her again. So, when Max sneaks into Sugar Ray's concert, he finds Phoebe there disguised as a chef to fight him off. The twins start fighting until Mark McGrath stops them. He shows them how happy his niece, Sarah is with Gideon. Max agrees to back down and give up on winning Sarah back. Meanwhile, Barb is concerned when she can't find Chloe's blankie because whenever it gets lost, Chloe throws a tantrum and becomes uncontrollable. After finding the blankie, Hank and Billy hide it, hoping to teach Chloe a lesson, but Dr. Colosso steals it. When Colosso throws a tantrum, refusing to give it back, Chloe realizes that it is not a good image on her. She gives up on the blankie. Guest stars: Mark McGrath, Helen Hong, Kenny Ridwan, Keely Marshall Absent: Addison Riecke as Nora Thunderman
87	18	"Revenge of the Smith"	Trevor Kirschner	Anthony Q. Farrell	January 20, 2018	416	1.01
To recognize Max and Phoebe for saving the school from Dark Mayhem at the prom, Hiddenville High commissions their best artist, Smith to paint a mural of the Thunder Twins. Little do they know that Smith has a grudge on the twins because she blames them for ruining her prom. So, instead of portraying them as heroes, Smith paints Phoebe and Max as supervillains attacking the other students. After getting a sneak peek of the painting, Max and Phoebe are disappointed. They invite Smith to Splatburger and apologize to her for unintentionally ruining her prom. Smith refuses to change it until she has humiliated the twins. The twins agree to be humiliated but after realizing that Smith will never be satisfied, they let everyone see the painting. Surprisingly, everyone loves the beautiful painting and don't care about whether the twins look as villains or heroes. When the twins save Smith from her failed attempt to knock them down, she agrees to redo the mural. Meanwhile, Nora is concerned about Billy's obsession with dabbing. With Dr. Colosso's help, Nora shows Billy a fake documentary of kids saying how much dabbing ruined their lives. Since Billy doesn't want to lose Nora, he stops dabbing. He replaces it with a new craze called "dadding" where he acts like his father. Nora and Colosso hate dadding even more. They would rather have him dab again. So, they reveal to him that the video was fake. Guest stars: Audrey Whitby, Jeff Meacham, Julia Lester, Lonnie Chavis
88	19	"Nowhere to Slide"	Jody Margolin Hahn	Genna Ryan	January 27, 2018	424	1.19
To prove to the girls that they can survive outdoors, Max, Billy and Hank go to camp in the wilderness but they can't even last a few hours. They return home and hide in the basement so that the girls don't find out. While the boys are out, Barb wants to show the girls some of her favorite farm traditions. However, Phoebe and Nora want to watch their favorite show. When Phoebe and Nora sneak into Max's lair to watch the show, Dr. Colosso convinces the boys to hide in the swirly slide. He later locks them in the slide for the whole night as part of his revenge because the boys refused to include him in their boy activities. Since the girls didn't invite him either, Dr. Colosso tips off Barb about Phoebe and Nora watching the show in the lair. Barb is very disappointed that the Phoebe and Nora would rather watch a show than spend time with her. To make it up to Barb, the girls recreate a farm experience with her and even a wild alpaca. Barb is touched by their effort, and later saves them when the wild alpaca turns against them.
89	20	"Significant Brother"	Eric Dean Seaton	Chase Heinrich & Micah Steinberg	February 3, 2018	419	1.30
When Cherry's brother, Perry comes to town, Cherry complains to Phoebe about how everyone becomes so obsessed with Perry and forgets about Cherry. But then, Perry asks Phoebe out on a date. Phoebe agrees but later tries to break it off. Perry makes it impossible for Phoebe to leave. Phoebe forgets her plans with Cherry. Cherry finds out and is furious that Phoebe chose Perry over her, just like everyone else. So, Phoebe hijacks a ceremony meant to honor Perry. She grabs the microphone by force and uses it to apologize and proclaim her love for Cherry. Cherry forgives Phoebe. Meanwhile, when Max realizes that Nora, Billy and Chloe are better than him at bottle-flipping, he refuses to admit it. He keeps challenging them to compete against him hoping to win, just once. He even offers to give them his lair if they beat him. They win the lair and he is forced to sleep outside in the rainstorm. He caves in and admits that his little siblings are better than him at bottle flipping. When he finally makes a bottle, no one is there to see. So, they don't believe him. Guest stars: Audrey Whitby, Evan Hofer
90	21	"Rhythm n' Shoes"	Carl Lauten	Nora Sullivan	February 17, 2018	423	1.08
Phoebe and Cherry want Hiddenville High to win a free concert from Cheyanne hoping to take a celebrity selfie with her. Max wants Cheyanne to come because he has a crush on her. Hiddenville High wins, thanks to Max's hacking. However, none of them are allowed backstage. Max gets backstage by taking credit of a DJ Colosso remix of Cheyanne's song. Phoebe and Cherry get in by pretending to be backup dancers. They use rhythm shoes from Dr. Colosso to help them dance like professionals. During the concert, the shoes malfunction, causing Phoebe and Cherry to destroy the stage. In the process, Cheyanne realizes that Max is a fake DJ. Max, Phoebe and Cherry are kicked out. Colosso reveals that he hacked the shoes to get revenge on Max for taking credit on his remix. Meanwhile, Nora's favorite hairwear store comes to town and she is excited to take Chloe to her first bow shopping. She runs into Heather and Stacie, known for making headbands and fedoras cool. Since Nora rocks bows, they invite her to join their hairwear squad. However, they don't want Nora to bring Chloe. So, Nora fakes being sick and sneaks into the store to meet up with them. She is surprised when Chloe comes in with her parents. Nora hides. She is touched when Chloe says that she wants to buy the best bow for Nora because Nora is the best big sister ever. After that, Nora confronts Stacie and Heather for making her ditch Chloe. She leaves their squad and goes to shop for bows with Chloe. Guest stars: Audrey Whitby, Daniella Perkins, Kate Marie Tomlinson, Laya Deleon Hayes Absent: Diego Velazquez as Billy Thunderman
91	22	"Make It Pop Pop"	Trevor Kirschner	Chase Heinrich & Micah Steinberg	February 24, 2018	431	1.09
Pop Pop and Nana Thunderman are visiting. Phoebe and Max accidentally reveal that Dr. Colosso lives with them. Since Pop Pop can't tolerate villains, he wants to send Colosso to the bad place called Detention Zone. When Max tries to protect Colosso, Pop Pop sends them both there through a portal. Phoebe begs Pop Pop to bring them back but he refuses. She freezes him and zaps herself into the Detention Zone. She finds them in a room with other villains and unsuccessfully tries to convince the teacher that she and Max are not actually villains. After escaping, the twins explain to their grandfather that Colosso helped save them because he is becoming a better person. Meanwhile, Nana wants Nora, Billy and Chloe to go to Splatburger with her while wearing the ugly sweaters she brought them. Nora convinces her siblings to hide the sweaters in the trash and lie that a bully stole them. Mrs. Wong finds the clothes. Nana Thunderman mistakes her for the bully. She gives Mrs. Wong a kindness pinch, making Mrs. Wong so nice that she starts giving things away for free. Realizing that Mrs. Wong could lose her business, Nora comes clean and asks Nana to turn Mrs. Wong back to her mean self. Guest stars: Helen Hong, William Katt, Erin Gray, Arianna Ortiz
92	23	"Side-Kicking and Screaming"	Trevor Kirschner	Lisa Muse Bryant	March 3, 2018	425	1.10
When Barb and Hank's former sidekick comes to visit, Max and Phoebe borrow him without their parental approval. They can't share him peacefully without fighting. When the sidekick can't take it anymore, he becomes sad and turns into an angry monster. They try to fight him without success. However, when they try to save each other from him, he turns back to normal. Chloe is selling girl-scout cookies but is having trouble getting customers. So, Nora convinces her to set up her station outside Splatburger. This leads to a confrontation with Mrs. Wong, who also tries to take them down by selling her own cookies. Nora helps Chloe win the war by asking Chloe to use her cuteness to her advantage. Guest stars: Thomas Lennon, Helen Hong
93	24	"Cookie Mistake"	Trevor Kirschner	Sean W. Cunningham & Mark Dworkin	March 10, 2018	426	1.02
Phoebe becomes the lucky winner to Sweet Gam Gam's Cookie Palace contest and is allowed to bring one person. Max, Nora and Billy start fighting over whom she should take. Both Max and Nora use blackmail and threats to "persuade" Phoebe into choosing them. Billy says he doesn't stand a chance because Max is Phoebe's twin and Nora is her sister. Phoebe realizes that she doesn't spend much time with Billy and chooses him instead. So, Nora and Max team up and sneak into the cookie palace. While Sweet Gam Gam is showing Phoebe and Billy around, Max and Nora start hacking the special micro-chip cookie. Phoebe finds out and stops them. Sweet Gam Gam mistakes Phoebe and Billy as the cookie thieves. She starts beating them up while Nora and Max are laughing. Max eventually starts to feel bad for them but Nora wants them to suffer. Max and Nora realize they're bad influence on each other. They come out clean. Sweet Gam Gam thanks them for being honest. Meanwhile, Hank is trying to relive his failed childhood dreams of winning Lil Mini Metroburg Talent Pageant by making Chloe participate even though she clearly doesn't want it. Special guest star: Marla Gibbs Guest star: Pat Finn
94	25	"All the President's Thunder-Men"	Eric Dean Seaton	Sona Panos	March 17, 2018	432	1.00
Hero League's Super President Kickbutt gets fed up with Max and Phoebe asking her for favors. When she starts blocking their calls, they make Chloe teleport Kickbutt into their house. After a heated argument, Kickbutt quits as the Hero League president and appoints Hank to succeed her. The Twins are happy because they can get whatever they want. Max buys a rocket shark and Phoebe makes Cherry her super assistant. For everyone else, being the first family is a pain. The Hero League guards forbid Nora and Billy from playing together, in order to protect Billy from being zapped by Nora. Meanwhile, Hank is struggling to run the Hero League. It turns out it's so much work than he expected. To make things worse, he's already the subject of a cake scandal investigation and Dr. Colosso is blackmailing him for it. He hides in Max's slide and starts crying. So, Max and Phoebe decide to get Kickbutt to take her job back. She refuses at first, but changes her mind after realizing how Hank is struggling. Kickbutt takes back her role as the Super President of the Hero League. Guest stars: Audrey Whitby, Daniele Gaither, Patrick Bristow
95	26	"Mad Max: Beyond Thunderhome"	Trevor Kirschner	Wesley Jermaine Johnson & Scott Taylor	May 25, 2018	428	1.30
Max has had enough of his parents' rules and decides to move out. He moves to his friend's house where the only rule is there are no rules. Max quickly realizes the consequences of living in a house without rules and can no longer handle it. He quickly comes to the realization that his parents' rules are in place for a reason and regrets his decision of moving out. Max pleads to his parents to let him move back in and, after promising to follow all the house rules, his parents allow him to move back in. Guest stars: Audrey Whitby, Kenny Ridwan, James Hong
96	27	"The Thundredth"	Eric Dean Seaton	Jed Spingarn	May 25, 2018	429	1.33
After their ninety-ninth save, Max and Phoebe want their hundredth save to be epic in hopes that the Hero League would make an epic movie about it. So, when Mrs. Wong asks them to stop a thief at Splatburger, they refuse to help, waiting for a bigger challenge. It turns out that the thief they refused to stop was the evil villain, Dr. Meteor who intends to destroy the planet with a Meteor. They eventually defeat him but President Kickbutt disqualifies the save because the twins had refused to help someone in need. Their hundredth save ends up being the twins saving Chloe's ice-cream from falling. Guest stars: Helen Hong, Daniele Gaither, Ian Ziering, Paris Berelc, Brian Stepanek
97	28	"Looperheroes"	Jonathan Judge	David Hoge & Dan Cross	May 25, 2018	422	1.28
On the day before the Z-Force finals championships, Max and Phoebe are stuck in a time loop, reliving the same day. At first, they assume the loop is happening because Z-Force wants them to have a day off. So, they decide not to help anyone in trouble, but that doesn't break the loop. Next, they try saving as many people as they can but that doesn't help either. Phoebe wants to tell the Hero League but Max says they should figure it out themselves. It is later revealed that it was Max who invented a loop clock to make them relieve the same day because he was scared of the upcoming Z-Force championships. Phoebe understands and helps him through his fears. Guest stars: Jeff Meacham, Helen Hong, Tanner Stine, Jake Borelli, Addyson Bell
98	29	"The Thunder Games"	Jonathan Judge	Jed Spingarn and Dan Serafin	May 25, 2018	412–413	1.39 (Note: Due to the duration of this episode, it leaked into Nick at Nite, which split the ratings since Nielsen considers it a separate network despite being on the same channel. The viewership data is a combined average of the ratings from both "networks", with 1.36 million total viewers for the Nickelodeon portion and 1.41 million total viewers for the Nick at Nite portion.)
The day for the Z-Force championships arrives. The Thunder Twins make an alliance with another finalist, Balfour. They invite him to their house where he meets Dr. Colosso and recognizes him as his father. He turns against them during the finals but the twins emerge victorious. In a last minute twist, the Z-Force Commander tells Max and Phoebe that only one of them can join Z-Force because they don't have a twin power. He forces them to fight against each other. Phoebe fakes an injury to let Max take the victory. Back at home, Balfour holds the Thundermans hostage as revenge for turning Dr. Colosso into a bunny. When Max realizes his family is in trouble, he asks Z-Force to help but they refuse. So, he leaves Z-Force and comes home to save his family. When Balfour locks the family in a cage, Max and Phoebe hold hands which activates their twin power. They break free and turn Balfour into a bunny like Colosso. After learning what happened, President Kickbutt disbands the Z-Force and asks Max and Phoebe to become the new leaders. The twins recruit the rest of the family as members and rename Z-Force to "T-Force". Guest stars: Audrey Whitby, Jeff Meacham, Daniele Gaither, Dana Snyder, Joey Bragg, Daran Norris, Natasha Hall

== See also ==
- List of The Thundermans characters
