= Wallflowers (novel series) =

Romance novel series by Lisa Kleypas

- First edition covers of the books
- Again the Magic (2004); Secrets of a Summer Night (2005); It Happened One Autumn (2005); Devil in Winter (2006); Scandal in Spring (2006); A Wallflower Christmas (2008)
- Author: Lisa Kleypas
- Country: United States
- Language: English
- Genre: Historical romance, historical fiction
- Publisher: Avon
- Published: 2004–2008
- Media type: Digital, print, audio
- No. of books: 6

Wallflowers is a series of five fictional historical romance novels and one novella written by Lisa Kleypas. Released from 2004 to 2008, it revolves around four young women as they help each other find husbands during the Regency era.

== Development ==
Kleypas started the Wallflowers after reconnecting with the romance writers community, with whom she had partially lost contact to devote herself to her family. She made friends with a little group of colleagues, including Eloisa James, which had a strong impact on her, so much so that, while thinking up an idea for a series, she realized she hadn't read many historical novels about female friendships. Also drawing inspiration from the bond with her high school classmates and the way they supported each other when they were not asked to dance by boys, Kleypas conceived the stories of four young women who are ignored at social events because they are not considered good marriage matches, and who, after becoming friends, promise to help each other find a husband.

== Overview ==
The novels "[perpetuate] a certain model of Englishness based on aristocratic wealth and power, large manor houses and elegant manners representative of the early 1800s", and their main setting is Stony Cross Park, a fictional estate in Hampshire. Most of the male protagonists (with the exception of Lord Westcliff and St. Vincent) are nouveaux riches who defend hard work, capitalism, and industrialisation, and are written as challenging the rigid class system and aristocratic privilege of England.

Prequel Again the Magic follows childhood friends Lady Aline Marsden and stable boy John McKenna, who part on bad terms when their budding romance is discovered and reunite years later, when he returns from New York after getting rich to take revenge on her.

Secrets of a Summer Night officially launched the series, and centers on Annabelle Peyton, an impoverished aristocrat who attempts to trap a wealthy nobleman in a marriage to maintain the appearance of wealth, and Simon Hunt, an ambitious and marginalized entrepreneur who repeatedly proposes to her to become his mistress.

It Happened One Autumn tells the rocky romance of Lillian Bowman, a strong-willed American heiress who does not understand the rules of etiquette, and Marcus Westcliff, a straitlaced and arrogant earl. Westcliff was a minor character in Again the Magic.

In Devil in Winter, Evangeline Jenner, the daughter of the wealthy owner of a notorious club in London, proposes marriage to destitute Viscount Sebastian St. Vincent to escape from her abusive relatives. The book follows the redemption of cold and selfish Sebastian due to Evie's good influence and love.

Scandal in Spring is the story of Daisy, the youngest of the quartet and Lillian's sister, and Matthew Swift, an employee of her father's company who is set to inherit the Bowman industry and has always loved her in secret, but whose mysterious past keeps from accepting the marriage.

A Wallflower Christmas is a follow-up novella, written as a blend of a Christmas special TV episode and a Hallmark Christmas movie, that features the main characters from the series and a new couple. Set in 1845, it follows Lillian and Daisy's brother, Rafe, who arrives in England to meet the noblewoman his father wants him to marry, but ends up pursuing her cousin, bluestocking Hannah Appleton. At the same time, it explores side plots where the four former "wallflowers" reinforce their bond and try to act as matchmakers for the couple.

== Publishing history ==
0. Again the Magic (2004, prequel)
1. Secrets of a Summer Night (2005, Annabelle's story)
2. It Happened One Autumn (2005, Lillian's story)
3. Devil in Winter (2006, Evie's story)
4. Scandal in Spring (2006, Daisy's story)
5. A Wallflower Christmas (2008, novella)

== Reception ==
Publishers Weekly wrote that Again the Magic "is another solid effort from an author who has established herself as one of the premier names in the genre" and praised the exploration of "some intriguing issues", predicting it to be a bestseller. Secrets of a Summer Night received a starred review for "deftly evoking not only the romantic tension between hero and heroine but also the conflicts and challenges of the Victorian era" and was deemed "a first-rate offering from a truly talented storyteller". It Happened One Autumn was evaluated as less fresh and with a corny beginning before evolving into an "engrossing, dynamic romance", and the characters were appreciated for being what distinguishes it from similar novels. Devil in Winter was described as having "high action and scintillating twists and trysts", while A Wallflower Christmas "passes muster as a holiday bonbon ... even if Rafe and Hannah hew too closely to genre archetypes".

The New York Times recommended It Happened One Autumn and its "sizzling romance" for nostalgics of the TV series The Gilded Age. Devil in Winter made the Romantic Times list of the 30 Best Regency Romance Novels of All-Time. In 2024, it was deemed one of The 50 Best Romance Novels to Read Right Now by the Time magazine.

== Crossovers ==
Cam Rohan from Devil in Winter would later become the male protagonist of Mine Till Midnight (book 1 in Kleypas's Hathaways series), and the Hathaways siblings live near Stony Cross Park, leading to meetings between characters from the two series. Further crossovers were made with the Ravenels series: Evie and Sebastian return as extras along with their children, two of whom – Gabriel and Phoebe – are protagonists of books 3 and 5, respectively. Furthermore, Lillian and Marcus's daughter Merritt is the female lead of Devil in Disguise (the Ravenels #7).

== Adaptation ==
The series had a 2-volumes manga adaptation in 2015. Volume 1 includes Secret of a Summer Night and It Happened One Autumn, while volume 2 includes Devil in Winter, Scandal in Spring, and A Wallflower Christmas.
