= The Haunted Hathaways =

American television sitcom

- Genre: Comedy horror Sitcom; Supernatural
- Created by: Robert Peacock
- Starring: Amber Montana; Curtis Harris; Benjamin "Lil' P-Nut" Flores, Jr.; Breanna Yde; Ginifer King; Chico Benymon
- Theme music composer: Adam Schlesinger
- Composer: Nick Pierone
- Country of origin: United States
- Original language: English
- No. of seasons: 2
- No. of episodes: 47 (list of episodes)

Production
- Executive producers: Robert Peacock; Boyce Bugliari; Jamie McLaughlin
- Producers: Mike Dieffenbach; Dionne Kirschner
- Production locations: Paramount Studios; Hollywood, California
- Cinematography: James W. Robinson
- Camera setup: Multi-camera
- Running time: 22 minutes
- Production companies: Bugliari/McLaughlin Productions; Nickelodeon Productions

Original release
- Network: Nickelodeon
- Release: July 13, 2013 – March 5, 2015

The Haunted Hathaways is an American television supernatural sitcom created by Robert Peacock that aired on Nickelodeon from July 13, 2013 to March 5, 2015. It tells the story of a single mother and her two daughters who move into a home occupied by three ghosts, a single father and his two sons. The two families solve their problems using the ghost powers and normal human methods.

== Premise ==
The series tells the story of a mother named Michelle Hathaway moving her two daughters, Taylor and Frankie, to New Orleans where they open a bakery. They come to find out that the house is haunted by Ray Preston and his two sons, Miles and Louie, as they are actually ghosts. The families learn how to live with each other and tackle everyday problems together.

== Episodes ==
Season	Episodes	Originally released	
Season	Episodes	First released	Last released
1	26	July 13, 2013	May 31, 2014
2	21	June 28, 2014	March 5, 2015

== Cast and characters ==
=== Main ===
- Amber Montana as Taylor Hathaway, the first daughter of Michelle Hathaway, and the older sister of Frankie Hathaway. As seen in the first episode, she is a talented gymnast who cares about her work and is easily agitated by her family and the Prestons.
- Curtis Harris as Miles Preston, the older son of Ray and older brother of Louie. He is the most well-mannered of the Preston ghosts, and tries the hardest to socialize with humans, especially Taylor. Miles does his best to help Taylor with her problems, but he tends to do more harm than good.
- Benjamin Flores Jr. as Louis "Louie" Preston, the son of Ray Preston, and is Miles Preston's younger brother. He tends to be rude and a little bit on the sarcastic side. He loves haunting and scaring people, though he hasn't quite mastered it yet. Louie doesn't understand why the Hathaways have to live with them in their house and isn't always so nice to the Hathaways, but he gradually accepts them and becomes best friends with Frankie.
- Breanna Yde as Francesca "Frankie" Hathaway, the second daughter of Michelle Hathaway, and the younger sister of Taylor Hathaway. She is considered strange by her peers, and embraces the idea of living with ghosts. Frankie doesn't easily get along with her older sister, Taylor, because they have different ways of dealing with things. Frankie and Louie have a complicated relationship because Frankie is often better at scaring people than he is, but they are still best friends. In the episode "Haunted Doll" it was revealed that her full name is Francesca.
- Ginifer King as Michelle Hathaway, the good-hearted single mother of Taylor and Frankie. She is divorced and along with her two daughters lives with the Prestons. Michelle is a skilled baker who owns a bakery called Pie Squared. Michelle tries to get along with her daughter, Taylor, but they always think of things differently and their problems tend to be controversial. Michelle and Ray also find a complicated relationship because of their different styles of parenting.
- Chico Benymon as Raymond "Ray" Preston, the father of Miles and Louie. As seen in the first episode, he plays the saxophone. Ray prefers a laid-back lifestyle, so he isn't very good at disciplining his sons when they misbehave.

=== Recurring ===
- Brec Bassinger as Emma, a girl on Taylor's gymnastics team and who goes to Taylor's school who tends to not understand much of what people around her do understand. She is very clumsy and ditzy.
- Juliette Angelo as Meadow, a girl who joins Taylor's gymnastics team and becomes Taylor's best friend. After an accident in the Hathaways' house, she gains the ability to see ghosts and soon becomes friends with Miles, not knowing that Miles is a ghost. She, however, does find out about Miles and her new-found ability and is fine with it (for the most part).
- JT Neal as Scott Tomlinson, a boy who Taylor has a crush on and then becomes her boyfriend.
- Kayla Maisonet as Lilly, a girl who attends the same school Taylor Hathaway attends and is on the school's gymnastics team. She does not appear in season 2.
- Diamond White as Sophie, a girl who attends the same school Taylor Hathaway attends and is on the school's gymnastics team.
- Ava Cantrell as Penelope Pritchard, a girl who attends the same school as Frankie Hathaway and is known for her crazy obsession with dolls. She is very wealthy and she doesn't like Frankie that much.
- Kim Yarbrough as Madame Lebeuf, a mystical and spiritual woman who makes a living by exorcising unwanted ghosts.
- Fred Stoller as Mr. Dobson, Louie's teacher at Ichabod Crane Academy.

== Production ==
Nickelodeon ordered the series pilot, directed by Bruce Leddy, in August 2012, and ordered 20 episodes in January 2013. On August 21, 2013, six additional episodes were picked up, bringing the first season up to a total 26 episodes. On October 21, 2013, Nickelodeon renewed The Haunted Hathaways for a second season.

The second season started airing on June 28, 2014. The series was filmed at Paramount Studios in Hollywood, California. The last episode aired on March 5, 2015.

== Broadcast ==
The series originally premiered on July 13, 2013 on Nickelodeon. It premiered on YTV on October 7, 2013 and Nickelodeon (Australia and New Zealand) on November 25, 2013. It premiered on British Nickelodeon on November 5, 2013. Asian Nickelodeon premiered the series on November 18, 2013 and African Nickelodeon on December 9, 2013.

== Reception ==
=== Critical ===
The Haunted Hathaways has generally received a positive reception. David Hinckley of the New York Daily News says that it has the traditions of "smashing two very different families together" and "having a normal level of sitcom zaniness compounded by the unexpected appearance of the supernatural." He enjoyed the idea of a traditional sitcom every once in a while. Sonia Saraiya of The A.V. Club claims it to be "unique and slightly convoluted" She also said that it has an "interesting" gender and racial breakdown.

=== Ratings ===
The series premiered on July 13, 2013 and scored 3.3 million viewers, after a brand new Sam & Cat. The next episode that aired scored 2.8 million viewers. As of November 2014, the most watched episode is the "Pilot" with 3.3 million viewers. The second most watched episode is "Haunted Sleepover" with 2.8 million viewers, and the least watched episode is "Haunted Revenge" with 1.23 million viewers. In Australia "Pilot" received 47,000 viewers, making it the third most watched Nickelodeon broadcast of that day. The same episode received 138,000 viewers in the United Kingdom.

=== Awards and nominations ===
Awards and nominations
Year	Award	Category	Nominated work	Result	Ref.
2014	Nickelodeon Kids' Choice Awards	Favorite TV Actor	Benjamin Flores Jr.	Nominated	
2014	Imagen Awards	Best Young Actress	Amber Montana	Nominated	
2014	Imagen Awards	Best Young Actor	Benjamin Flores Jr.	Won	
2014	Writers Guild of America Award	Children's Script – Episodic and Specials	Bob Smiley for "Haunted Heartthrob"	Won	
2014	Writers Guild of America Award	Children's Script – Episodic and Specials	Boyce Bugliari & Jamie McLaughlin for "Haunted Sisters"	Nominated	
2015	NAACP Image Award	Outstanding Performance by a Youth in a Youth/ Children's Program - (Series or Special)	Amber Montana	Nominated	
2015	NAACP Image Award	Outstanding Performance by a Youth in a Youth/ Children's Program - (Series or Special)	Curtis Harris	Nominated	

== See also ==
- List of ghost films
