= The Fairly OddParents (franchise) =

American media franchise

- Created by: Butch Hartman
- Original work: The Fairly OddParents shorts from Oh Yeah! Cartoons
- Owners: Nickelodeon Group (Skydance)
- Years: 1998–present

Films and television
- Films: A Fairly Odd Movie: Grow Up, Timmy Turner!; A Fairly Odd Christmas; A Fairly Odd Summer
- Television series: The Fairly OddParents (2001–2017); The Fairly OddParents: Fairly Odder (2022); The Fairly OddParents: A New Wish (2024)

Games
- Video game(s): The Fairly OddParents: Breakin' Da Rules; The Fairly OddParents: Shadow Showdown

Miscellaneous
- Theme park attraction: Fairly Odd Coaster

The Fairly OddParents is an American media franchise created by Butch Hartman for Nickelodeon. It officially began as a series, in 2001 after releasing shorts on Oh Yeah! Cartoons from 1998. As a result of the series, by-products were launched, including video games, theme park attractions, figurines, and toys.

== Development ==
Prior to the creation of The Fairly OddParents, Butch Hartman was working at Cartoon Network on Dexter's Laboratory and Johnny Bravo. In 1997, Fred Seibert contacted Hartman about pitching ideas for Seibert's new company, Frederator Incorporated, as a part of their Oh Yeah! Cartoons series which the studio was developing for Nickelodeon. Hartman initially declined the offer. Several months later, Johnny Bravo finished and Hartman decided to create his own series instead of going back to working for other studios.

Hartman started developing his own series by drawing a picture of a little boy who would become Timmy Turner. Hartman was originally going to name him Mike, after his brother Mike Hartman, but they had a fight that day, so Hartman named him after his other brother Timmy Hartman instead. Hartman wanted Timmy to be able to go anywhere because he never wanted to be stuck for a story transition. Hartman was originally going to give Timmy science powers, but decided against it due to Dexter's Laboratory having recently come out. Instead, he decided to give Timmy a magic friend. He drew Venus (later renamed Wanda) first and then decided, because he had never heard of a fairy godfather before, to draw Cosmo. After coming up with the entire premise for the cartoon in about fifteen minutes, Hartman first pitched the idea to Hanna-Barbera and then to Cartoon Network, both of whom turned it down. Hartman then went back to Seibert at Nickelodeon and successfully pitched it to them for Oh Yeah! Cartoons.

Unlike the later series, the animation in the original shorts is not as smooth and the designs are notably different (including Timmy's parents, Mr. and Mrs. Turner, who are only seen from the neck down with their faces hidden in the pilot episodes and appear to be more intelligent than they appeared to be in the proceeding series, yet still easily duped by Vicky's abhorrent actions). Other notable differences include Timmy Turner, who was voiced by Mary Kay Bergman in the Oh Yeah! shorts rather than Tara Strong in the series (Strong would dub over Bergman's dialogue in the Oh Yeah! shorts to establish better continuity). Cosmo is significantly more intelligent than he appears to be in the preceding series, while Wanda is shown to be ditzy. Vicky is also much less evil than in the current series; she has a little brother in the pilot episode before it was changed to a little sister later on in the shorts and she also calls Timmy by his name as opposed to the more often used "twerp".

== Television series ==
=== Oh Yeah! Cartoons (1997–2001) ===
While in early development, the series was titled The Fairy GodParents and then it was briefly changed to Oh My GodParents. Bill Burnett came up with the title The Fairly OddParents, which they ended up sticking with. Hartman originally created The Fairly OddParents as a seven-minute short film, which was one of the thirty-nine short cartoons created for Oh Yeah! Cartoons. Hartman made ten seven-minute short films of The Fairly OddParents in total for Oh Yeah! Cartoons, which aired on Nickelodeon from September 4, 1998, to March 23, 2001. Due to the success of the shorts, Nickelodeon picked up The Fairly OddParents for a full-length series alongside fellow Oh Yeah! Cartoons: ChalkZone and My Life as a Teenage Robot. In 2000, Nickelodeon ordered seven 23-minute episodes for the series' first season, which premiered on March 30, 2001 (just one week after the final Oh Yeah! short) in the half-hour before fellow Nicktoon Invader Zim made its debut.

Unlike the later series, the animation in the original shorts is not as smooth and the designs are notably different (including Timmy's parents, Mr. and Mrs. Turner, who are only seen from the neck down with their faces hidden in the pilot episodes and appear to be more intelligent than they appeared to be in the proceeding series, yet still easily duped by Vicky's abhorrent actions). Other notable differences include Timmy Turner, who was voiced by Mary Kay Bergman in the Oh Yeah! shorts rather than Tara Strong in the series (Strong would dub over Bergman's dialogue in the Oh Yeah! shorts to establish better continuity). Cosmo is significantly more intelligent than he appears to be in the proceeding series while Wanda is shown to be ditzy. Vicky is also much less evil than in the current series; she has a little brother in the pilot episode before it was changed to a little sister later on in the shorts & she also calls Timmy by his name as opposed to the more often used "twerp".

=== Original series (2001–2017) ===
Upon its premiere, The Fairly OddParents was immediately popular and quickly became the second-highest-rated children's program among kids ages 2–11 on both network and cable television, behind Nickelodeon's own SpongeBob SquarePants. The series managed to briefly steal SpongeBob's spot as the number one highest rated children's television program in mid-2003. The Fairly OddParents also attracted a wide audience, appealing to kids as well as to teenagers and adults, with 14.2 million kids 2-11 tuning in each week, 10.8 million adult viewers per week and was the number one series on television among tween audiences (9-14). On January 24, 2006, Hartman announced on his forum that Nickelodeon had ceased production of the show.

Later on July 7, 2007, a special titled 77 Secrets of the Fairly OddParents Revealed hinted that a new character would join the series. After a one-year hiatus, Nickelodeon announced that they would begin the sixth season, which would consist of twelve episodes alongside the broadcast of a television film called Fairly OddBaby, which introduced a new character, a baby fairy named Poof, to the main cast of characters. A huge hit, Fairly OddBaby aired on February 18, 2008, and garnered 8.89 million viewers for its premiere; the rebroadcast of the film the following day garnered 4.82 million viewers, making it the number one and ninth most viewed cable broadcast respectively for the week of February 18–24, 2008.

To honor the tenth anniversary of The Fairly OddParents, a live-action television film titled A Fairly Odd Movie: Grow Up, Timmy Turner! premiered on July 9, 2011. The film is set 13 years after the animated series and stars Drake Bell as a 23-year-old Timmy Turner, who is trying his hardest not to grow up in order to prevent losing his fairy godparents, and Daniella Monet as Tootie, who has grown into a mature and beautiful activist with whom Timmy falls in love. The premiere of the movie attracted 5.8 million viewers and it was the top-rated television broadcast on cable networks for the week of July 10–16, 2011, and ranked as "2011's Top Original TV Movie on Basic Cable with Kids and Total Viewers". Its spawned two sequels: A Fairly Odd Christmas and A Fairly Odd Summer, which premiered on November 29, 2012, and August 2, 2014 respectively. Drake Bell and Daniella Monet reprised their respective roles in both of the sequels.

The ninth season of The Fairly OddParents began with a television special titled "Fairly OddPet", which premiered on March 23, 2013, and attracted 3.8 million viewers. The ninth season's official run began on May 4, 2013. Season nine introduced a new character, Timmy's pet fairy dog Sparky, to the show's main cast. Season nine contained twenty-six episodes, making it the longest season in the series. It is also the first season to be formatted in both high definition and widescreen.

The tenth season of The Fairly OddParents began with a special called "The Big Fairy Share Scare!", which introduced another new main character named Chloe Carmichael, Timmy's neighbor who he is forced to share Cosmo and Wanda with due to a fairy shortage. The tenth season aired from January 15, 2016, to July 26, 2017, on both Nickelodeon and Nicktoons. The visuals and lyrics for the theme song were changed for season ten in order to include Chloe. Also in season 10, the show's animation made the transition from traditional animation to Flash animation. The animation for season ten was done by Elliott Animation Studios in Canada, whereas all of the prior seasons were animated by Yeson Animation Studios in South Korea.

=== Live-action spin-off series (2022) ===
On February 24, 2021, it was announced that a live-action sequel series was in development and debut on Paramount+. Hartman and Seibert return as producers, while Christopher J. Nowak serve as both executive producer and showrunner. The series started production in July 2021 and premiered on March 31, 2022, with one season.

=== Sequel series (2024) ===
In 2023, Nickelodeon and Paramount Global applied to register "The Fairly OddParents: A New Wish" with the USPTO under several NICE classes. A screenwriter from Season 9 of the original series confirmed a new project was in development. On February 23, 2024, further details about the series were revealed, including an impending Netflix debut, the return of Daran Norris and Susanne Blakeslee as Cosmo and Wanda respectively, and the focus on a new main character, Hazel Wells. It premiered on May 20, 2024 on Nickelodeon, with one season.

== Video games ==
Four video games have been released based on the series. The first video game, The Fairly OddParents: Enter the Cleft! was released exclusively for the Game Boy Advance on November 6, 2002, in North America. The second video game, The Fairly OddParents: Breakin' da Rules was released for the Game Boy Advance, GameCube, PlayStation 2, Xbox, and Windows exclusively in North America on November 3, 2003. The third video game, The Fairly OddParents: Shadow Showdown was released for Microsoft Windows, GameCube, PlayStation 2, and Game Boy Advance on September 9, 2004, in North America. The fourth video game, Fairly Odd Parents: Clash with the Anti-World was released exclusively for the Game Boy Advance on October 17, 2005.

The show was featured in most Nicktoons crossover video games, including Nicktoons Basketball released for Windows PCs on September 11, 2004, Nicktoons: Freeze Frame Frenzy was released for the Game Boy Advance on September 20, 2004, Nicktoons Movin' was released for the PlayStation 2 on October 21, 2004, the 2005 video game Nicktoons Unite! was released for the PlayStation 2, Game Boy Advance, GameCube, and Nintendo DS, Nicktoons Winners Cup Racing was released for Windows PCs on February 15, 2006, Nicktoons: Battle for Volcano Island was released for the PlayStation 2, Game Boy Advance, GameCube, and Nintendo DS on October 24, 2006, and Nicktoons: Attack of the Toybots was released for the Game Boy Advance, PlayStation 2, Wii, and Nintendo DS on October 23, 2007. The show was also featured in an arcade racing game, Nicktoons Nitro, released on November 10, 2009.

Timmy Turner and his alter ego, Cleft the Boy Chin Wonder, are playable characters in the official mobile game Nickelodeon Super Brawl Universe.

== Theme park attractions ==
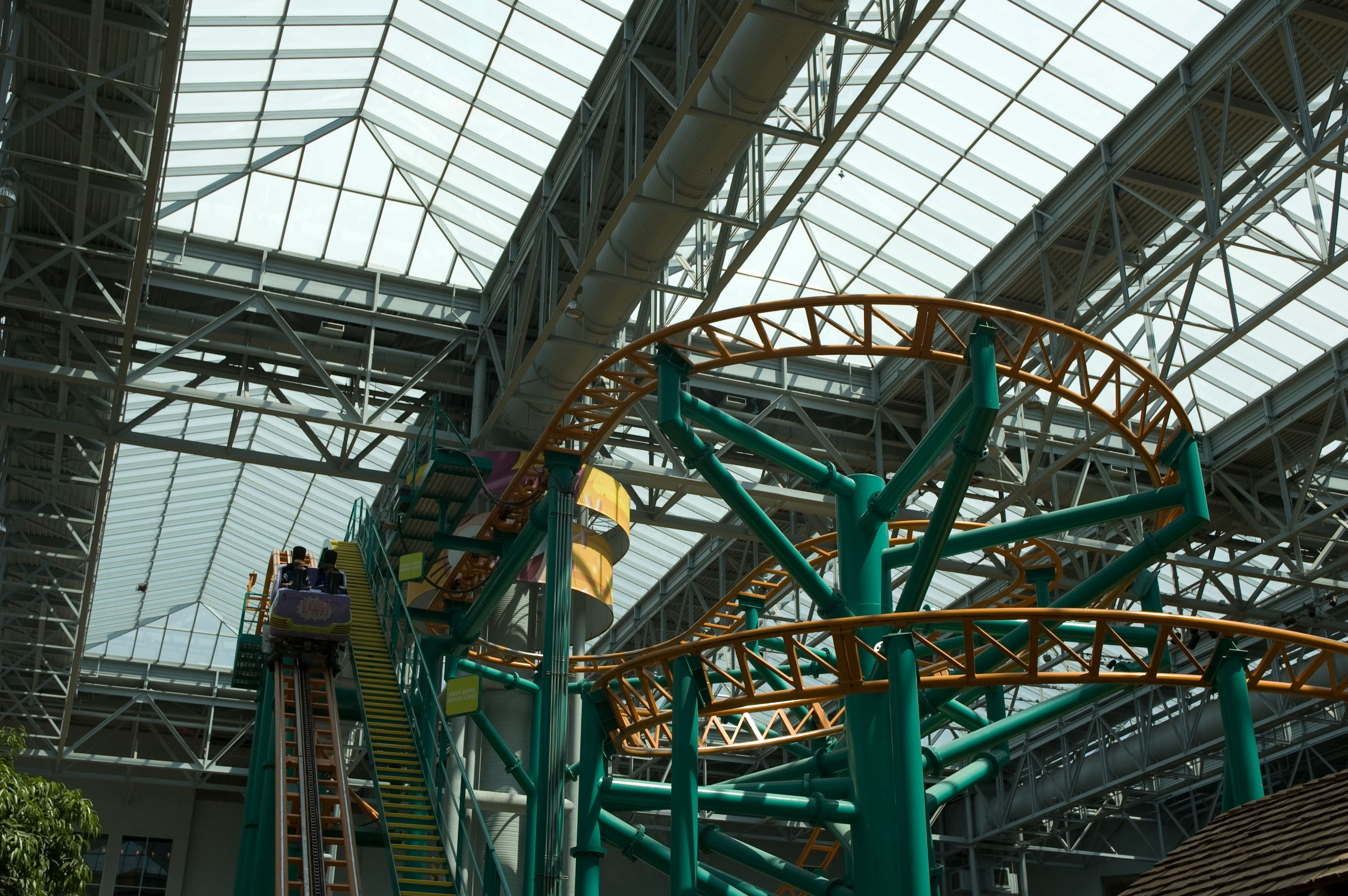
Photograph of the Fairly Odd Coaster ride at the Nickelodeon Universe Mall of America

There are 3 attraction rides based on the show at Nickelodeon Universe in American Dream and Mall of America. Fairly Odd Coaster, located in Mall of America and formerly known as Timberland Twister in 2004, is a spinning roller coaster themed to the show that opened in 2007. In American Dream, there are 2 attraction rides themed to the show titled Fairly Odd Airways, designed for toddlers, and Timmy's Half-Pipe Havoc, a half-pipe roller coaster suitable for all ages, opened on October 25, 2019.

== Broadcast and streaming ==
The original show aired on the main Nickelodeon channel before moving to Nicktoons after September 16, 2016. From then until July 26, 2017, new episodes premiered on the Nicktoons channel. After it ended, reruns are sometimes shown on Nicktoons until 2023.

In June 2019, The Fairly OddParents was added to Pluto TV alongside other Nickelodeon/Nick Jr. shows.

As of July 30, 2020, all seasons are available on Paramount+. Seasons four and five of the show are currently streaming on Netflix in the United States, as of May 2024.

=== Home media ===
The first eight seasons have been released on DVD-R format exclusively through Amazon, starting with the first season in 2009. The TV movie Wishology has its own release on the format, separate from the sixth season's set.

The complete series was released by Paramount Pictures in a 35-disc set on December 10, 2024 (originally scheduled for November 26, 2024). Seasons 9 and 10 also received separate sets to complement the already-existing Amazon releases.

== Figurines and toys ==
In 2004, Palisades Toys released a line of collectible Fairly OddParents figures.

In 2012, Jazwares released several Fairly OddParents figures and plushies as part of the Nicktoons toy line.

== Popular culture in music ==
American rapper Desiigner premiered a track titled "Tiimmy Turner" on July 21, 2016, based on the character Timmy Turner.

Brazilian rapper Xamuel released a single titled "Cosmo e Wanda Freestyle" in 2025, inspired by the characters Cosmo and Wanda.
