= The Fairly OddParents (disambiguation) =

The Fairly OddParents is a 2001 animated series.

The Fairly OddParents may also refer to:

- The Fairly OddParents (franchise)
- The Fairly OddParents (film series)
- The Fairly OddParents: Fairly Odder, second incarnation of the franchise
- The Fairly OddParents: A New Wish, third incarnation of the franchise
- "The Fairly OddParents!", an episode of Oh Yeah! Cartoons and the titular show
- Cosmo and Wanda, characters of The Fairly OddParents
- "The Fairly OddParents", theme song from the titular show
