= The Fairly OddParents (film series) =

Series of television films

- Directed by: Savage Steve Holland
- Screenplay by: Butch Hartman
- Based on: The Fairly OddParents By Butch Hartman
- Starring: Drake Bell; Daniella Monet; Daran Norris; Susanne Blakeslee; Tara Strong; Teryl Rothery; David Lewis; Mark Gibbon; Devon Weigel
- Edited by: Anita Brandt-Burgoyne; Damon Fecht
- Music by: Guy Moon
- Production companies: Billionfold.inc; Frederator Studios
- Distributed by: Nickelodeon
- Country: United States

The Fairly OddParents is an American series of television films produced through Nickelodeon, loosely based on Butch Hartman's animated series The Fairly OddParents. The series consists of three films: Grow Up, Timmy Turner! (2011), A Fairly Odd Christmas (2012), and A Fairly Odd Summer (2014).

== Films ==
=== A Fairly Odd Movie (2011) ===
Grow Up, Timmy Turner! premiered on July 9, 2011 and received 5.8 million viewers, following a 23-year-old Timmy Turner (Drake Bell), who is trying to prevent himself from growing up in order to keep his fairy godparents Cosmo, Wanda, and Poof from disappearing from his life. His resolve is tested when Tootie (Daniella Monet) returns to town as a beautiful, grown-up woman, as falling in love would be seen as a sign of adulthood and would cause him to lose his friends. Meanwhile, Mr. Crocker has teamed up with the evil businessman Hugh J Magnate Jr. (Steven Weber) in an attempt to capture Timmy's fairies and use them for their own selfish purposes.

=== A Fairly Odd Christmas (2012) ===
A Fairly Odd Christmas premiered on November 29, 2012 and received 4.473 million viewers. The film picks up where the first movie left off and follows Timmy and Tootie, who now travel around the world granting wishes. They are unaware that doing this has placed them at odds with Santa Claus (Donavon Stinson), as this is interfering with Christmas and putting the holiday at risk of cancellation.

=== A Fairly Odd Summer (2014) ===
A Fairly Odd Summer premiered on August 2, 2014 and received 2.8 million viewers. Timmy is working at a yuck disposal center in Fairy World while Tootie helps out at the Helping Creatures Dimmsdale Research Center. When Tootie is called away to Hawaii to help save a rare sea creature, Timmy discovers that she has accidentally left her supplies behind and must find a way to give it back to her. Meanwhile, Poof is being pursued by his arch-nemesis Foop (played by Scott Baio in human form, and voiced by Eric Bauza reprising his role in fairy form).

== Cast and characters ==
| Characters | Films | | |
| Characters | A Fairly Odd Movie: Grow Up, Timmy Turner! | A Fairly Odd Christmas | A Fairly Odd Summer |
| Characters | 2011 | 2012 | 2014 |
|---|---|---|---|
| Timmy Turner | Drake Bell | Drake Bell | Drake Bell |
| Timmy Turner | Drake Bell | Drake Bell | Tara Strong (fairy voice) |
| Cosmo | Daran Norris | Daran Norris | Daran Norris |
| Cosmo | Jason Alexander (live action) | Daran Norris | Daran Norris |
| Wanda | Susanne Blakeslee | Susanne Blakeslee | Susanne Blakeslee |
| Wanda | Cheryl Hines (live action) | Susanne Blakeslee | Susanne Blakeslee |
| Poof | Tara Strong | Tara Strong | Tara Strong |
| Poof | Randy Jackson (speaking voice) | Tara Strong | Tara Strong |
| Tootie | Daniella Monet | Daniella Monet | Daniella Monet |
| Mr. Denzel Crocker | David Lewis | David Lewis | David Lewis |
| Jorgen Von Strangle | Mark Gibbon | Mark Gibbon | Mark Gibbon |
| Vicky | Devon Weigel | Devon Weigel | Devon Weigel |
| Timmy's Mom | Teryl Rothery | Teryl Rothery | Teryl Rothery |
| Timmy's Dad | Daran Norris | Daran Norris | Daran Norris |
| Katie | Olivia Steele Falconer | Olivia Steele Falconer | |
| Ravi | Qayam Devji | Qayam Devji | |
| Mouse | Diego Martinez-Tau | Diego Martinez-Tau | |
| Hugh J. Magnate, Jr. | Steven Weber | | |
| Chester McBadBat | Chris Anderson | | |
| A.J. | Jesse Reid | | |
| Janice | Christie Laing | | |
| Howie | Darien Provost | | |
| The Mayor of Dimmsdale | Serge Houde | | |
| Dingle Dave | | Travis Turner | |
| Christmas Carol | | Devyn Dalton | |
| Santa Claus | | Donavon Stinson | |
| Elmer the Elder Elf | | Tony Cox | |
| Foop | | | Eric Bauza |
| Foop | | | Scott Baio (live action) |
| Marty Mulligan | | | Carter Hastings |
| Mitzy Mulligan | | | Ella Anderson |
| Mr. Ed Leadly | | | Tony Alcantar |

== Crew ==
| Occupation | Films | | |
| Occupation | A Fairly Odd Movie: Grow Up, Timmy Turner! | A Fairly Odd Christmas | A Fairly Odd Summer |
| Occupation | 2011 | 2012 | 2014 |
|---|---|---|---|
| Director | Savage Steve Holland | Savage Steve Holland | Savage Steve Holland |
| Producer(s) | Scott McAboy; Fred Seibert; Marjorn Cohn; Lauren Levine; Butch Hartman | | Amy Sydorick |
| Composer | Guy Moon | Guy Moon | Guy Moon |
| Writer(s) | Butch Hartman; Scott Fellows | Butch Hartman; Ray DeLaurentis; Will Schifrin | Butch Hartman; Ray DeLaurentis; Will Schifrin; Kevin Sullivan |
| Cinematographer(s) | Jon Joffin | Gordon Verheul | Tom Harting |
| Editor(s) | Anita Brandt-Burgoyne; Damon Fecht | Anita Brandt-Burgoyne; Damon Fecht | Anita Brandt-Burgoyne; Damon Fecht |
