= Scout's honor (disambiguation) =

Scout's honor or Scout Law is a set of codes in the Scout movement.

Scout's Honor may also refer to:

- Scout's Honor (1980 film), an American made-for-television comedy drama film
- Scout's Honor (2001 film), an American documentary film
- Scout's Honor (The Fairly OddParents), a short film of the TV series The Fairly OddParents

== See also ==
- Scout's Honor... by Way of Blood, a 1997 album by American rapper Rampage
