= The Fairly OddParents: Breakin' Da Rules =

2003 video game

- North American Windows cover art
- Developers: Blitz Games (PS2, GC, Xbox); Helixe (Game Boy Advance); Gorilla (Windows)
- Publisher: THQ
- Director: Jon Cartwright
- Producer: Team Phoenix
- Designer: Scott West
- Programmers: Claude Dareau; Philip Palmer; Nigel Higgs; John Weeks; Ian Bird
- Artists: Marc Buckingham; Nadine Mathias
- Writers: Chris Bateman; Richard Boon
- Composers: John Guscott; Matt Black
- Series: The Fairly OddParents
- Engine: BlitzTech
- Platforms: Microsoft Windows; Game Boy Advance; GameCube; PlayStation 2 Xbox
- Release: NA: November 10, 2003
- Genre: Action
- Mode: Single-player

The Fairly OddParents: Breakin' Da Rules is a video game released for the Game Boy Advance, GameCube, PlayStation 2, Xbox, and Windows in North America on November 10, 2003. It is based on the Nickelodeon cartoon The Fairly OddParents. It was developed by Blitz Games for the PlayStation 2, GameCube and Xbox, Helixe for Game Boy Advance and Gorilla for Windows, and published by THQ.

Its sequel, The Fairly OddParents: Shadow Showdown, was released on the same platforms, except for the Xbox.

== Plot ==
The story differs between the home console, PC, and Game Boy Advance versions of the game.

=== Home console versions ===
Timmy Turner's parents have gone on a vacation and left Timmy with evil babysitter Vicky. When Timmy tries to make a wish, his fairy godparents Cosmo and Wanda tell him that it's against "Da Rules". Outraged, Timmy wishes he didn't have to follow the rules, leading Cosmo to destroy the book. When Vicky arrives, she gains possession of Da Rules. She wishes that Timmy was still sleeping, and since she has possession of a fairy item, her wish is granted. Timmy, Cosmo, and Wanda go to Fairy Court, where they're accused of destroying Da Rules, and Jorgen Von Strangle gives the three of them 49½ hours to find the book's missing pages. Timmy must navigate through ten levels and find the pages before Vicky's wishing goes too far. By the end of the game, everything is back to normal and Da Rules has all of its pages back.

=== PC version ===
Juandissimo Magnifico tricks Timmy into wishing Da Rules destroyed so that Cosmo and Wanda will get in trouble for it. It also notably features an appearance by Vicky and Tootie's mother (at Timmy's age, as the level featuring her is set in the past), named Nicky. She is shown behaving a lot like Tootie, and Timmy initially mistakes her for Tootie when he first sees her, although the in-game graphics depict her as resembling a young Vicky.

=== Game Boy Advance version ===
Anti-Cosmo and Anti-Wanda steal Da Rules, and use Vicky's dreams as a conduit for their magic. As punishment, Cosmo and Wanda are demoted to 3rd-Class Fairies. In response, they arm Timmy with an anti-magic backpack and magic cannon. Eventually, the Anti-Fairies are defeated and Cosmo and Wanda wake Vicky, restoring peace and convincing Jorgen to promote them back to 1st-Class Fairies.

== Reception ==
Scores

Aggregate scores
Aggregator	Score
GameRankings	PS2(5 reviews): 73.0% GBA(1 review): 64.0% Xbox(5 reviews): 68.4% GC(10 reviews): 61.5% PC(1 review): 40.0%
Metacritic	PS2(4 reviews): 60%

Review score
Publication	Score
IGN	5/10

Breakin' da Rules received mixed to positive reviews. The GameRankings aggregate score was highest for the PlayStation 2 version (73%); the others were slightly negative, as far down as 40% on the PC. Mary Jane Irwin of IGN gave the game 5.0/10, citing its "sluggish" controls and low difficulty, concluding that the game felt "generic and sad when the license allows for so much creativity and freedom".
