= List of The Fairly OddParents characters =

Fictional characters

Characters from the Nickelodeon animated media franchise The Fairly OddParents, created by Butch Hartman, include the following.

== Overview ==
Character	Voiced by	The Fairly OddParents Short films	The Fairly OddParents Animated series	The Jimmy Timmy Power Hour	Wishology!	The Fairly OddParents Film series	The Fairly OddParents: Fairly Odder	The Fairly OddParents: A New Wish
Timmy Turner	Tara Strong (Note: Voiced by Mary Kay Bergman in The Fairly OddParents shorts, voiced by Alec Baldwin in Channel Chasers, portrayed by Drake Bell in the film trilogy, and by Caleb Pierce in Fairly Odder.)	Main	Main	Main	Main	Main	Guest	
Cosmo	Daran Norris (Note: Portrayed by Jason Alexander in A Fairly Odd Movie: Grow Up, Timmy Turner!.)	Main	Main	Main	Main	Main	Main	Main
Wanda	Susanne Blakeslee (Note: Portrayed by Cheryl Hines in A Fairly Odd Movie: Grow Up, Timmy Turner!.)	Main	Main	Main	Main	Main	Main	Main
Vicky	Grey DeLisle (Note: Portrayed by Devon Weigel in the film trilogy and Mary Kate Wiles in Fairly Odder.)	Main	Main	Main	Main	Guest	Guest	Guest
Denzel Crocker	Carlos Alazraqui (Note: Portrayed by David Lewis in the film trilogy.)		Main	Main	Main	Main	Guest	Guest
Poof "Peri"	Tara Strong (Note: Voiced by Randy Jackson in A Fairly Odd Movie: Grow Up, Timmy Turner!, and Eric Bauza in The Fairly OddParents: A New Wish.)		Main		Main	Main		Recurring
Sparky	Maddie Taylor		Main					
Chloe Carmichael	Kari Wahlgren		Main					
Jorgen Von Strangle	Daran Norris (Note: Portrayed by Mark Gibbon in the film trilogy.)		Main	Main	Main	Recurring	Guest	Recurring
Foop "Irep"	Eric Bauza		Main					Recurring
Jimmy Neutron	Debi Derryberry			Main				
Cindy Vortex	Carolyn Lawrence			Main				
Turbo Thunder	Brendan Fraser				Main			
The Darkness	Dee Bradley Baker				Main			
M.E.R.F. Agents	Patrick Warburton				Main			
Trixie Tang	Dionne Quan		Recurring		Main			
Tootie	Grey DeLisle (Note: Voiced by Amber Hood in The Fairly OddParents shorts, and portrayed by Daniella Monet in the film trilogy.)	Guest	Recurring			Main		
Marty Mulligan	Carter Hastings					Main		
Mitzy Mulligan	Ella Anderson					Main		
Viv Turner	Audrey Grace Marshall						Main	
Roy Raskin	Tyler Wladis						Main	
Hazel Wells	Ashleigh Crystal Hairston							Main

== Introduced in The Fairly OddParents ==
=== The Fairly OddParents main characters ===
==== Children ====
===== Timmy Turner =====
Timmy Turner
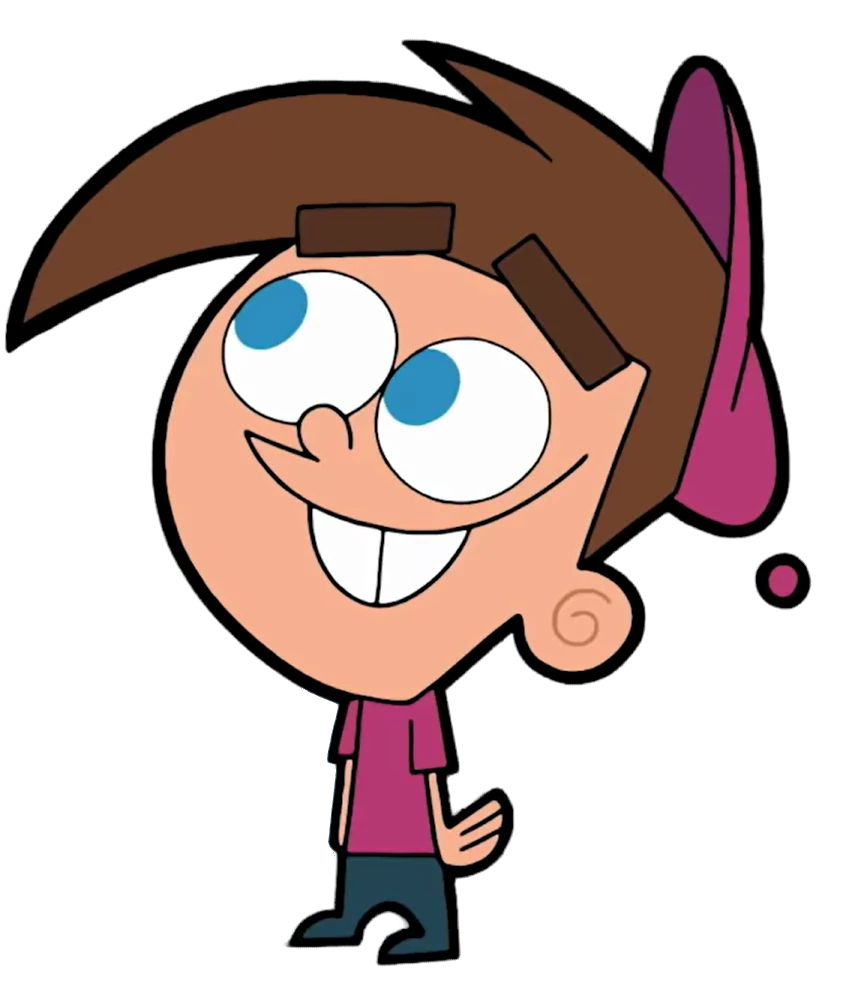
- First appearance: "The Fairly OddParents!"; Oh Yeah! Cartoons; September 6, 1998
- Created by: Butch Hartman
- Portrayed by: Drake Bell (live-action films); Caleb Pierce (Fairly Odder)
- Voiced by: Tara Strong (Note: Voiced by Mary Kay Bergman in The Fairly OddParents shorts, voiced by Alec Baldwin in Channel Chasers, portrayed by Drake Bell in the film trilogy, and by Caleb Pierce in Fairly Odder.)

In-universe information
- Full name: Timothy Tiberius Turner II
- Nickname: Timmy
- Species: Human
- Gender: Male
- Occupation: Student
- Family: Mr. and Mrs. Turner (parents); Cosmo and Wanda (godparents); Poof (godbrother)
- Spouse: Tootie (future wife)
- Significant other: Trixie Tang
- Children: Tommy and Tammy Turner (possible future; Channel Chasers)
- Relatives: Pappy (paternal grandfather); Vlad, and Gladys (maternal grandparents); Gertrude (great-aunt)
- Nationality: American

Timothy "Timmy" Tiberius Turner II is a 10-year-old boy who was given fairy godparents to grant his every wish as a result of his neglectful parents and abuse from Vicky. He also has a comically large malocclusion, which is usually mocked. It is strongly implied that his Pappy gave him this by leaving his pacifier in his mouth for too long. His wishes often have unpredictable and problematic side effects, and are often reverted upon Timmy's request by the end of the episode. His interests include comic books, video games, cartoons, and sports. During a time travel trip, Timmy accidentally arrives the day his parents moved into their house; unseen, he learns that they were expecting a girl, hence his pink hat.

Timmy is not cast in the sequel series A New Wish, yet it is revealed that Cosmo and Wanda remained as Timmy's fairy godparents until he turned 17 years old.

Hartman originally wanted to give him the last name Taylor, but that was close to Tim Allen's character name Tim Taylor in Home Improvement. Hartman has also stated that Timmy is his alter ego: "He's a wise guy. He's sarcastic. He's quick-tempered... He loves comic books. He loves video games. ... He's pretty much my alter ego, except I didn't have fairy godparents."

===== Chloe Carmichael =====
Chloe Carmichael (voiced by Kari Wahlgren) is Timmy's neighbor who debuted in the series' 10th and final season. Due to there not being enough fairies available for kids, overwhelming demand and fairies taking on better paying jobs in the fancy candle industry, she and Timmy are forced to share Cosmo and Wanda. Although in the beginning they do not get along, they end up becoming best friends. Chloe is seen by Timmy as an annoying, goody goody, and boastful, little girl and she has the tendency to cause chaos with her wishes.

==== Fairies ====
===== Cosmo and Wanda =====
Cosmo and Wanda
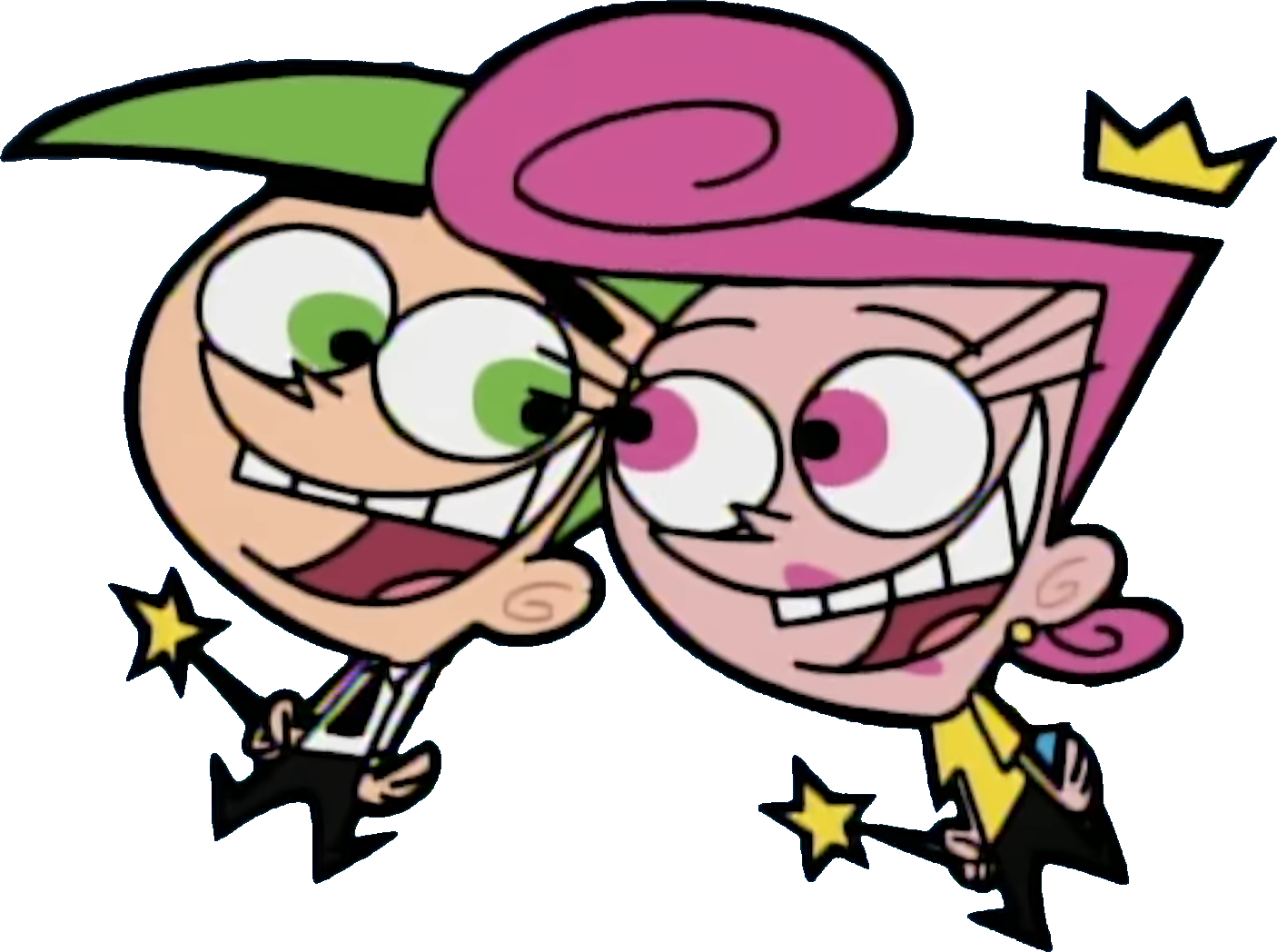
- First appearance: "The Fairly OddParents!"; Oh Yeah! Cartoons
- Created by: Butch Hartman
- Voiced by: Daran Norris; Susanne Blakeslee
- Portrayed by: Jason Alexander; Cheryl Hines

In-universe information
- Full name: Cosmo Julius Cosma and Wanda Venus Cosma (née Fairywinkle)
- Species: Fairy
- Gender: Male (Cosmo) and Female (Wanda)
- Family: Timmy Turner (godson); Poof/Peri(A New Wish) (son)

Cosmo and Wanda are fairy godparents assigned to grant Timmy's, and later Chloe's, wishes. They later became Hazel's godparents in the CG sequel A New Wish. They were previously the godparents of Denzel Crocker, Billy Gates, Tina Turner, and other historical and modern day figures; such as Benjamin Franklin. To avoid being seen by humans other than Timmy, they often disguise themselves as other humans, animals or inanimate objects.

====== Cosmo ======
Cosmo Julius Cosma (voiced by Daran Norris in the original Oh Yeah! Cartoons, the main TV series and related media, including the 2022 live-action revival/reboot series Fairly Odder and 2024 CG sequel series A New Wish, portrayed by Jason Alexander in A Fairly Odd Movie: Grow Up, Timmy Turner) is Wanda's husband, Poof's father, and Timmy and Chloe's godfather. He is known for his dimwitted and childish personality, his lack of common sense and has been responsible for inadvertently causing disasters since he was born. As explained in "Fairly Oddbaby", Cosmo's ability for destruction is such that when he was born, all fairies were henceforth no longer allowed to have children out of the fear that another potential fairy baby would be as bad as or worse than Cosmo. Although he is very laid back, childish and dim, Cosmo is prone to fits of jealousy and becomes defensive when he sees others flirting with Wanda. He was the youngest fairy until Poof was born and, though he was considered an only child in earlier episodes, he had a brother named Schnozmo that debuts later. His mother, Mama Cosma, is overprotective of Cosmo and thus despises Wanda and tries to separate them.

====== Wanda ======
Wanda Venus Cosma (née Fairywinkle) (voiced by Susanne Blakeslee in the original Oh Yeah! Cartoons shorts, the main TV series and related media, including the 2022 live-action revival/reboot series Fairly Odder and 2024 CG sequel series A New Wish, portrayed by Cheryl Hines in A Fairly Odd Movie: Grow Up, Timmy Turner) is Cosmo's wife, Poof's mother, and Timmy and Chloe's godmother. She is depicted as being smart and caring. Unlike Cosmo, she tries to prevent Timmy from wishing for things which can be disastrous, though her attempts often fail. However, she is responsible for the extinction of dinosaurs, 65 million years ago. She has a sister, who is a popular actress, named Blonda whom she fights with a lot, as Wanda believes her sister's life as a star is easier than hers as a housewife. Wanda also has a father named Big Daddy, who also despises Cosmo similar to how Mama Cosma dislikes Wanda but to a much lesser extent. Wanda has an obsession with chocolate, and it is one of the only things that can distract her from her top priorities.

Wanda's design, especially the hair swirl, is based on Wilma from The Flintstones. In the original pitch for the series, Wanda was named Venus and had blue hair.

===== Poof / Peri =====
Poof (vocalizations are done by Tara Strong in the main television series and related media and speaking voice is done by Randy Jackson in A Fairly Odd Movie: Grow Up, Timmy Turner and Eric Bauza in The Fairly OddParents: A New Wish) is Cosmo and Wanda's son, introduced into the series in the 2008 special Fairly OddBaby. He was the first fairy baby born in over ten thousand years, with his own father being the second to last. His magical abilities are controlled by his emotions and channeled through his magic rattle.

In the ninth-season episode "Fairy Old Parent", Poof is assigned as a fairy godparent to Mrs. Crocker, but quits after becoming overworked and exhausted. In The Fairly OddParents: A New Wish, Poof appears as an adult, having become known as Peri and assigned to be Dev Dimmadome's fairy godparent. The name change was made because "Poof" is a slur in many countries.

Poof was originally going to be named Dusty.

===== Sparky =====
Sparky (voiced by Maddie Taylor) (Note: Credited as Matthew W. Taylor) is Timmy's talking fairy dog, who was introduced in the ninth season. Sparky is a talking, anthropomorphic dog with yellow fur, a wand for a tail, a dark blue nose, and fairy wings. Unlike Timmy's fairy godparents, humans are allowed to known that Sparky exists, but cannot known that he is capable of speech. Following the ninth season, the character was written out of the series due to negative reception from fans and audiences.

==== Vicky ====
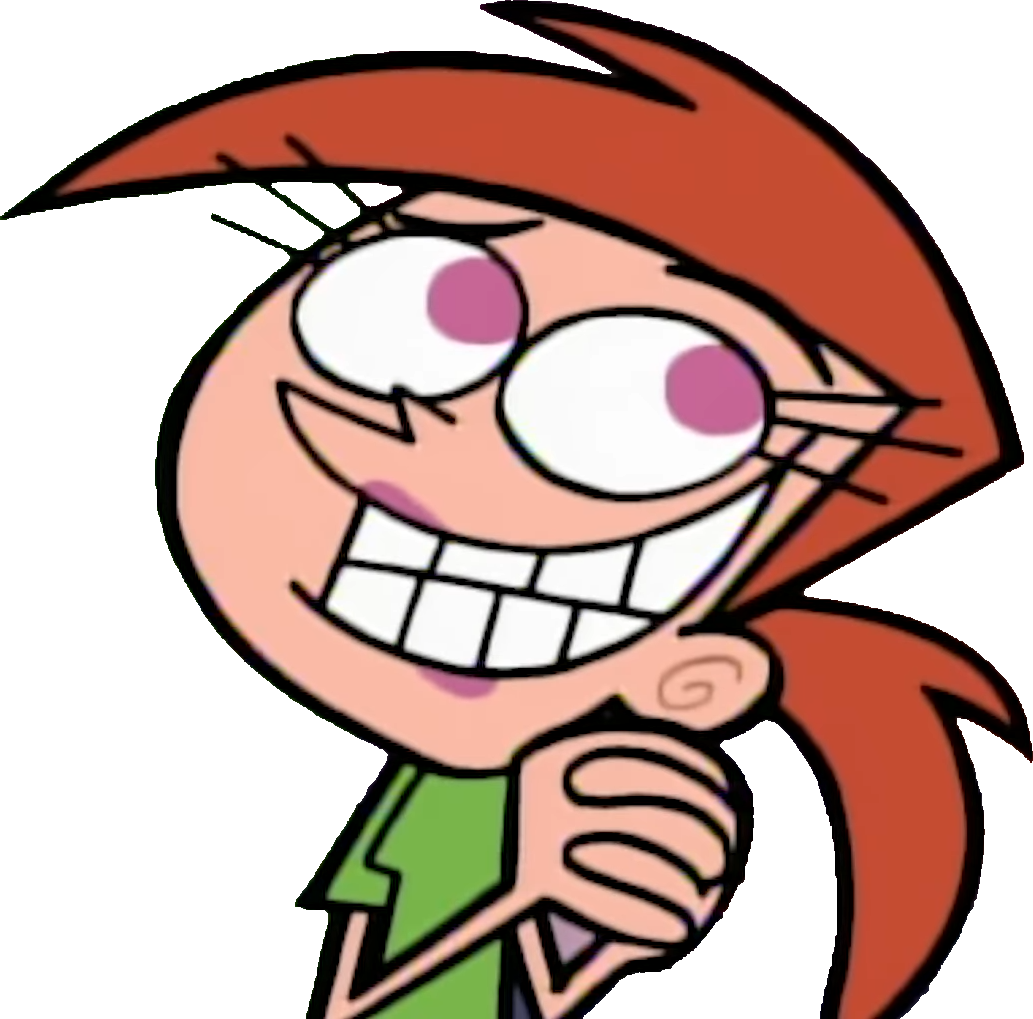
Vicky

Vicky (voiced by Grey DeLisle in the original Oh Yeah! Cartoons shorts, the main television series and related media and portrayed by Devon Weigel and Mary Kate Wiles in The Fairly OddParents: Fairly Odder) is Timmy's abusive, selfish, greedy, sadistic, conniving, malicious, and tyrannical 16-year-old babysitter, and one of the main antagonists in the series. She has but a few friends and enjoys torturing children, watching television and making the world miserable, especially for Timmy, who she often teases and insults. She lives with her mother, her father, and her younger sister Tootie. She has encountered Cosmo and Wanda on numerous occasions, but does not believe in them. Timmy out of revenge, uses Cosmo and Wanda wisely to torment her.

Vicky also appears as a recurring antagonist in The Fairly OddParents: Fairly Odder, where she is now a teacher at Dimmsdale Junior High. In The Fairly OddParents: A New Wish, she appears in the episode "Operation Birthday Takeback", now working as a birthday party entertainer.

==== Denzel Crocker ====
Denzel Quincy Crocker, usually called Mr. Crocker, or simply Crocker (voiced by Carlos Alazraqui and portrayed by David Lewis), is a grayish-skinned, hunchbacked man and Timmy's fairy-obsessed teacher, and one of the main antagonists in the series. He correctly suspects that Timmy has fairy godparents of his own, and he is often able to tell what Timmy has wished for by the smallest, most irrelevant clues. His unshakable belief in fairy godparents leads to other adults perceiving him as mentally ill. A running gag has him spasm uncontrollably whenever he shouts, "FAIRY GODPARENTS!"

Surprisingly, Crocker is the previous godchild of Cosmo and Wanda. Though he lost them and the memories of their time with him, his belief in fairies remains. Timmy tries to alter this event via time travel in "The Secret Origin of Denzel Crocker!", but he paradoxically fails and becomes the reason Crocker lost Cosmo and Wanda and made him remember his belief in fairies.

Crocker is based on Walter Kornbluth from the 1984 film Splash. He was also designed to be in another cartoon that Hartman was pitching, but was placed in the show as the latter needed more villains. Crocker returns in The Fairly OddParents: Fairly Odder, reprised in both animation and live-action. In The Fairly OddParents: A New Wish episode "Crock to the Future", Crocker returned with his hair mostly thinned out and is now a janitor at the Dimmadelphia Galax Institute, but still has his crazy evil obsession ways with capturing fairies; Alazraqui reprised his role from the two previous series of the franchise.

=== The Fairly OddParents supporting characters ===
==== Turner Family ====
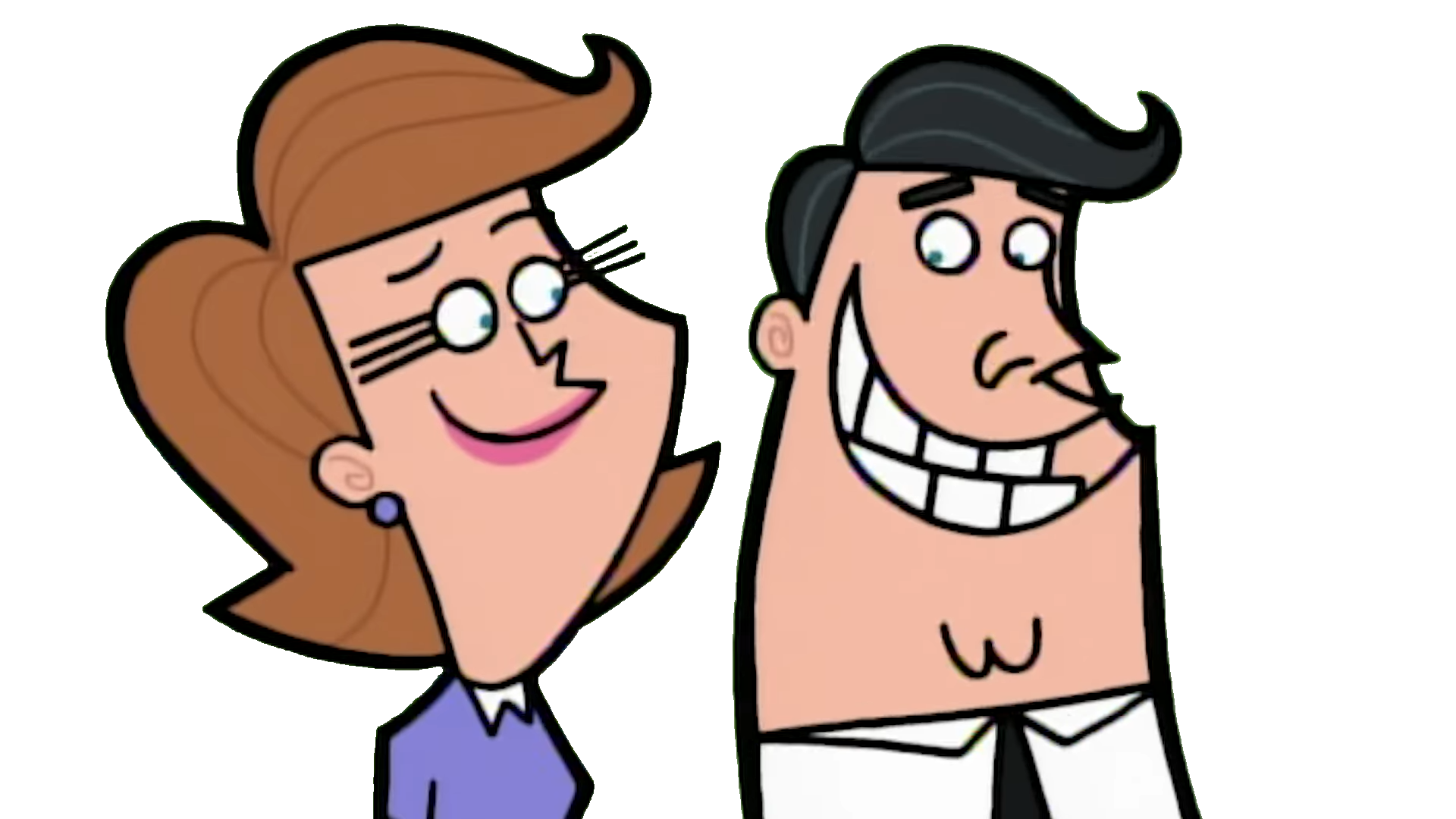
Mrs. Turner and Mr. Turner

- Mr. Turner, also known as "Dad", (voiced and portrayed by Daran Norris in the series and the live-action films respectively) and Mrs. Turner, also known as "Mom", (voiced by Susanne Blakeslee, portrayed by Teryl Rothery in the live-action films) are Timmy's parents. Mom works as a real estate agent, and Dad works as an employee in a pencil factory called "Pencil Nexus" and he is also a Troop leader for Timmy's "Squirrelly Scouts" Troop, though both of them had several other jobs, usually only for a single episode. When either of them mentions their first names, they are usually cut off or silenced in a comedic way (like a truck horn), and they were even referred to as "Mom" and "Dad" as children. Timmy's mom is shown to be a horrible gardener and cook, as anything she tries to grow dies and her meals usually comes alive and try to attack her family, she used to be called "Barnaby" (a code-name in "The Poltergeeks" team). Timmy's dad is often shown hating the Dinklebergs, the next door neighbors, especially Sheldon Dinkleberg, which can be compared to Homer Simpson's hatred for Ned Flanders in The Simpsons. Both of them are completely oblivious to the magic in their house, and despite their love for Timmy, they tend to be somewhat neglectful and silly. They leave Timmy with Vicky, his babysitter, and are oblivious to signs that she is evil, even going as far as believing that the song "Icky Vicky" was about pumpkins. Mr. Dinkleberg and Mrs. Turner used to be a couple during their teenage years.

Hartman originally designed Timmy's parents to only appear from the neck down in Oh Yeah! Cartoons.

==== Dimmsdale children ====
- Chester McBadbat (voiced by Frankie Muniz 2001–2003; Jason Marsden 2003–2017) is one of Timmy's best friends. He lives in a trailer with his father in an impoverished community with few amenities. He is generous and cares more for others than himself, as every time he obtains magic, he uses his wishes to try to improve the lives of others, even though it usually leads to disaster. Chris Anderson portrays him in A Fairly Odd Movie: Grow Up, Timmy Turner!.
- Anthony James Jr. (voiced by Ibrahim Haneef Muhammad 2001–2003; Gary LeRoi Gray 2003–present), simply A.J., is the resident genius in Timmy's class, and one of his best friends. He comes from an upper middle class African American family, wears a collegiate outfit with a sweater vest, and always earns A grades in school, as did both his parents. He has constructed an older brother who defends him from bullies, fulfilling his need for a real one. Despite his studiousness, he still finds time to watch TV, play video games, and read comic books with his friends. He has a secret laboratory that he conceals with a "cloak" button on his bedroom wall which, when pressed, converts his lab into a typical bedroom. Jesse Reid portrays him in A Fairly Odd Movie: Grow Up, Timmy Turner!. He returns in The Fairly OddParents: A New Wish, having founded the Galax Institute in Dimmadelphia.
- Tootie (voiced by Grey DeLisle in the TV series, Amber Hood in the Oh Yeah! Cartoons episode "The Fairy Flu", portrayed in the live-action films by Daniella Monet) is Vicky's younger sister. She is a bespectacled girl who has an obsessive crush on Timmy, often going to the extreme of spying on and stalking him. While Timmy rejects her regularly, he does have a soft spot for her and does nice things for her in several episodes. When Vicky isn't torturing the children she babysits, she regularly tortures Tootie at home in substitution. She mainly appears from seasons 2 to 7 before phasing out of point in the show afterwards. Tootie is one of the main characters in the three live-action films, in which she has grown up to be an attractive activist and ultimately becomes Timmy's girlfriend. Her name originates from Hartman's nickname for his daughter Carly.
- Elmer (voiced by Dee Bradley Baker, named for Butch Hartman's real name) is a "nerdy" student and one of Timmy's friends. His most notable feature is the abnormally large boil on his face whom he named Bob (after series animator Bob Boyle). Unbeknownst to the rest of the world, Bob is sentient and evil. Elmer is the only one who can hear Bob speak and tries to keep his boil in check.
- Sanjay (voiced by Dee Bradley Baker) is an Indian-American boy who is one of Timmy's friends. He speaks with a high-pitched voice, which is accompanied by a strong accent. He often has to put up with his stepfather's military ways of life as if he were in boot camp. He also has a recurring dream about Timmy saving him while riding a white horse.
- Trixie Tang (voiced by Dionne Quan) is the object of Timmy's affection and the most popular girl at Dimmsdale Elementary. Due to Timmy not being popular, Trixie rarely acknowledges his existence, except in secret. By the ninth season, Trixie is no longer Timmy's love interest, but they remain good friends. She is since downsized as a background cameo due to Quan departing from her role after the season. Since Trixie's suspension, Timmy briefly shares a relationship with another girl named Missy.
- Veronica (voiced by Grey DeLisle) a popular girl at school, who is Trixie Tang's obsessive best friend who wants to be Trixie. She also has a secret crush on Timmy.
- Tad (voiced by Tara Strong) and Chad (voiced by Grey DeLisle) are two of Timmy's wealthy, popular classmates. They often make fun of Timmy and other unpopular students and frequently turn Trixie away from Timmy by embarrassing him or impressing her with their money.
- Kevin Crocker (voiced by Carlos Alazraqui) is the nephew of Mr. Crocker, being the son of his half-sister. He is physically identical to his uncle. Kevin debuts as a guest in "Chip off the Old Crock!", where his uncle tries to instruct him to follow in his footsteps to hunt fairies but ends up befriending Chloe and Timmy, becoming a recurring character for the tenth season.

==== Dimmsdale Elementary School staff ====
- Principal Geraldine Waxelplax (voiced by Grey DeLisle) is the Irish-accented principal at Dimmsdale Elementary School and was once in love with Denzel Crocker, but broke up with him when she realized his obsession with fairies. She has a full-figured physique and loves any kind of food, especially jelly donuts, but is unable to eat cake because, as she states, she's "frosting intolerant".
- Mr. Bickles (voiced by Jim Ward) is Timmy's flamboyant drama teacher. A running gag is that he always has a "new dream" that is later "ruined", usually as the result of something Timmy has done.
- Mr. Birkenbake (voiced by Rob Paulsen) is another teacher at Timmy's school and the chief editor of the school newspaper. He is a hippie that lives in a trailer and collects items made of "smoof" which he calls "the greatest natural occurring substance in the world". His name is a reference to Birkenstock sandals which are commonly associated with hippies.

==== Fairies ====
- Jorgen Von Strangle (voiced by Daran Norris, played by Mark Gibbon in the live-action films) is a giant, muscular fairy and the self-described "toughest fairy in the universe", who speaks with an Austrian accent (a reference and resemblance to Arnold Schwarzenegger's character Dutch Schaefer from Predator) and serves as a high-ranking official in Fairy World as well as the chief instructor of the Fairy Godparent Academy. Unlike other fairies who "poof" from place to place, Jorgen appears and disappears in the form of an atomic explosion and has a jet pack instead of wings. He used to have a godchild named Winston but is no longer allowed to have any godchildren since his extreme wish-granting and daredevil stunts unnecessarily endanger their lives. As an anti-hero, he wants to push fairy godparents in training to be their absolute best, but he is sadistic and enjoys the idea of others being afraid of him, which affects his ability to have friends besides Cosmo and Wanda. Despite this brutish nature, he sometimes cries under pressure or becomes frightened by danger. He once dated the Tooth Fairy before breaking up over Timmy's teeth. He is also Cosmo's distant cousin.
- Binky Abdul (voiced by Dee Bradley Baker) is a meek yet optimistic fairy whom Jorgen often abuses and berates.
- Juandissimo Magnifico (voiced by Carlos Alazraqui) is Remy Buxaplenty's fairy godparent who speaks with an overexaggerated Spanish accent. He is often a villain in the episodes in which he appears alongside his godchild, but is actually a kind fairy whom Timmy considers a friend. He is Wanda's ex-boyfriend and is still infatuated with her, much to Cosmo's chagrin. A running gag has him magically tearing off his white T-shirt to show off his muscles and then making it reappear shortly thereafter.
- Cupid (voiced by Tom Kenny) is a fairy who promotes love across the universe, yet his arrogance contrasts his love-themed abilities.
- The Tooth Fairy (voiced by Grey DeLisle) is one of the few adult human-sized fairies, who is dedicated to exchanging the teeth that children leave under the pillows for coins. For the first five seasons, she is shown to be Jorgen Von Strangle's wife.
- Mama Cosma (voiced by Jane Carr) is Cosmo and Schnozmo's mother. She loathes Wanda and repeatedly attempts to get rid of her because of the over-protective bond she has with her son.
- Blonda Fairywinkle (voiced by Julia Louis-Dreyfus in her first appearance and Tara Strong in all subsequent appearances) is the twin sister of Wanda. She is far more self-centered and vain compared to Wanda. She is the star of the soap opera "All My Biceps" which is Jorgen's favorite show. In "Fairy Idol", she is seen to be in love with Juandissimo. She is only seen in season 5.
- Dr. Rip Studwell (voiced by Jim Ward in the first appearance, Butch Hartman thereafter) is a fairy physician who insists on being referred to by his full name and usually plays golf and spends time with ladies rather than performing medical procedures. He is a caricature of Hartman himself.
- Big Daddy Fairywinkle (voiced by Tony Sirico) is the father of Wanda and Blonda. He is the boss of a fairy mafia and uses a garbage removal company as a legitimate business front. Similar to Mama Cosma, he disapproves of Wanda's choice of husband, but he cares for her greatly regardless.
- Santa Claus (voiced by Tom Arnold in his normal form and Kevin Michael Richardson in his other form, played by Donavon Stinson in A Fairly Odd Christmas) is the figure of holiday folklore. Outside of Christmas time he is a thin businessman that wears a suit and has neatly trimmed hair. Near Christmas, he is lent magic by all the fairies of the world which transforms him into the most commonly recognized form.
- Baby New Year is the figure of holiday folklore. He is a giant baby that only speaks with a giant "goo" and always carries a rattle.
- The Easter Bunny (voiced by Robert Costanzo) is the figure of holiday folklore. He talks with a Brooklyn mob accent.
- The April Fool (voiced by Daran Norris) is the "embodiment of comedy" who is Fairy World's chief comedian and tells jokes very frequently at Uncle Knuckle's Chuckle Bunker. His voice and mannerisms are similar to Jerry Seinfeld.

==== Superheroes ====
- The Crimson Chin (voiced by Jay Leno, Daran Norris in episodes "Super Humor" and "Fairy Fairy Quite Contrary") is a comic book superhero whose comics Timmy and many other children in the series enjoy reading. Though he has many standard superhero abilities such as flight, superior strength, and heat vision, his main weapon is his enormous chin: a reference to that of his voice actor, which he gained when he used to be a talk show host and a radioactive actor bit him on the chin. Sometimes, Timmy joins him in his comic book adventures as his sidekick "Cleft the Boy Chin Wonder," and at other times, the Chin comes to the real world via fairy magic. He lives in "Chincinnati", and his alter ego is Charles Hampton "Chuck" Indigo, a writer for the newspaper The Daily Blabbity.
- Catman (voiced by Adam West in Season 4–6, Jeff Bennett in Season 9-10) is actor Adam West's alter ego, and a good friend of Timmy's. He is considered insane by most people since he thinks he is part cat because of a TV show he was part of 30 years ago. The character is a reference to West's role as Batman on the 1960s television show.
- Crash Nebula (Sprig Speevak) (voiced by Daran Norris, James Arnold Taylor in the "Crash Nebula" special) is a fictional space hero whose television show is watched by Timmy and his friends. He is a parody of Buzz Lightyear.

==== Other ====
- Mark Chang (voiced by Rob Paulsen) is a teenage alien warrior prince from the planet of Yugopotamia, located almost 10,760 astronomical units away from Earth, and one of Timmy's friends. Mark resembles a green octopodiformes creature with a brain contained in glass and a "Fake-i-fier" on his waist, allowing him to shapeshift into objects and human forms. Introduced in "Spaced Out", Mark and the other aliens of Yugopotamia are horrified by things commonly considered cute and are attracted to those traditionally seen as disgusting. Mark has a crush on Vicky, who believes he is an exchange student from Europe. His parents eventually marry him to the vicious, homicidal Princess Mandie (the second half of her name pronounced the same way as the word "die"); he subsequently escapes to the Dimmsdale Dump on Earth and resides there for the rest of the series. He also celebrates F.L.A.R.G., a holiday celebrating revolting activities before destroying the host's planet. Originally planned to have a monstrous voice, Mark was instead given a stereotypical Southern Californian dialect improvised by Paulsen.
- The Mayor of Dimmsdale (voiced by Carlos Alazraqui, portrayed by Serge Houde in the first live action film) is the city's unnamed mayor for life who was first introduced in "Dream Goat!", where he is very protective (and somewhat jealous) of the city's famous mascot, Chompy the Goat (also voiced by Alazraqui), who in later episodes seems to become a very good friend of the Mayor, and is sometimes a literal "scapegoat" for when the Mayor needs to blame something on someone.
- The Dinklebergs are the Turners' next-door neighbors. Mr. Turner believes Sheldon Dinkleberg (voiced by Carlos Alazraqui) to be his nemesis and blames him for numerous misfortunes. Nevertheless, Sheldon is a well-meaning and friendly neighbor and puts up with Mr. Turner's hatred of him, and he even humors the theories Mr. Turner makes about himself. He and his wife, Mrs. Dinkleberg, (voiced by Susanne Blakeslee) do not have any children and so can afford many luxuries that the Turners cannot. In their youth, Sheldon dated Mrs. Turner, which has now increased Mr. Turner's obsessive feelings of hatred towards him. Their last name is an allusion to DINK, due to them being childless and rich unlike the Turners.
- Bucky McBadbat (voiced by Rob Paulsen) is Chester's father and former baseball player who was expelled from the Major League Baseball for being, per Timmy's words, "the worst baseball player ever". He wears a paper bag on his head out of shame.
- Mrs. Dolores Crocker (voiced by Carlos Alazraqui) is Mr. Crocker's mother, who lives with her son. Mr. Crocker does not support her.
- Chet Ubetcha (voiced by Jim Ward) is Dimmsdale's muscular and charismatic newscaster. He is only shown from the waist up when reporting on TV, hiding his disproportionately short legs.
- Chip Skylark (voiced by Chris Kirkpatrick) is a widely popular teenage pop singer. Two of his songs prominently featured in the series are "My Shiny Teeth and Me", an admiring tribute to his impressively clean and healthy teeth; and "Icky Vicky", which he writes after ending a brief relationship with Vicky unknowingly caused by one of Timmy's wishes. He is modeled after his voice actor, a then-member of the boy band *NSYNC. He mainly appears in seasons 2 and 3 and makes a brief comeback singing a birthday song for Timmy in a later episode.
- Britney Britney (voiced by Tara Strong) is a successful pop singer regarded as the "Princess of Pop" in Dimmsdale, parodying Britney Spears. Her major role time mainly occurs during the series' original run until her only appearance in "Momnipresent" in the revival before being written out from the show due to Spears' negative reputation since 2006.
- Flappy Bob (voiced by S. Scott Bullock) is a clown that was separated from his parents as a baby and raised by the Pixies to be a boring businessman. He was the founder and original owner of Flappy Bob's Camp Learn-A-Torium.
- Happy Peppy Gary (voiced by Rob Paulsen) and Happy Peppy Betty (voiced by Grey DeLisle) are two of the workers at Flappy Bob's Camp Learn-A-Torium who are very overprotective of the children in their care. Gary has a crush on Betty but she doesn't see him that way.
- Doug Dimmadome (voiced by Jim Ward), is the richest and most powerful businessman in Dimmsdale, who owns a large collection of companies and buildings and usually introduces himself in full as "Doug Dimmadome, owner of the Dimmsdale Dimmadome", in reference to a popular arena. Based on his wealth, status, and Western attire, he is most likely a parody of American businessman William Randolph Hearst. He has a son named Dale Dimmadome and, in The Fairly OddParents: A New Wish, a grandson named Devin "Dev" Dimmadome.
- King Gripullon (voiced by Rob Paulsen) and Queen Jipjorrulac (voiced by Laraine Newman) are Mark Chang's parents, and rulers of Yugopotamia.
- Mr. Ed Leadly (voiced by Rob Paulsen, portrayed by Tony Alcantar in A Fairly Odd Summer) is the president and CEO of Pencil Nexus, and boss of Timmy's Dad. His design resembles a small #2 pencil.
- Clark (voiced by Mick Wingert) and Connie (voiced by Cheri Oteri) are Chloe's parents. He is a "Professional Hero", and she is an "Extreme Veterinarian".

=== The Fairly OddParents recurring antagonists ===
==== Francis ====
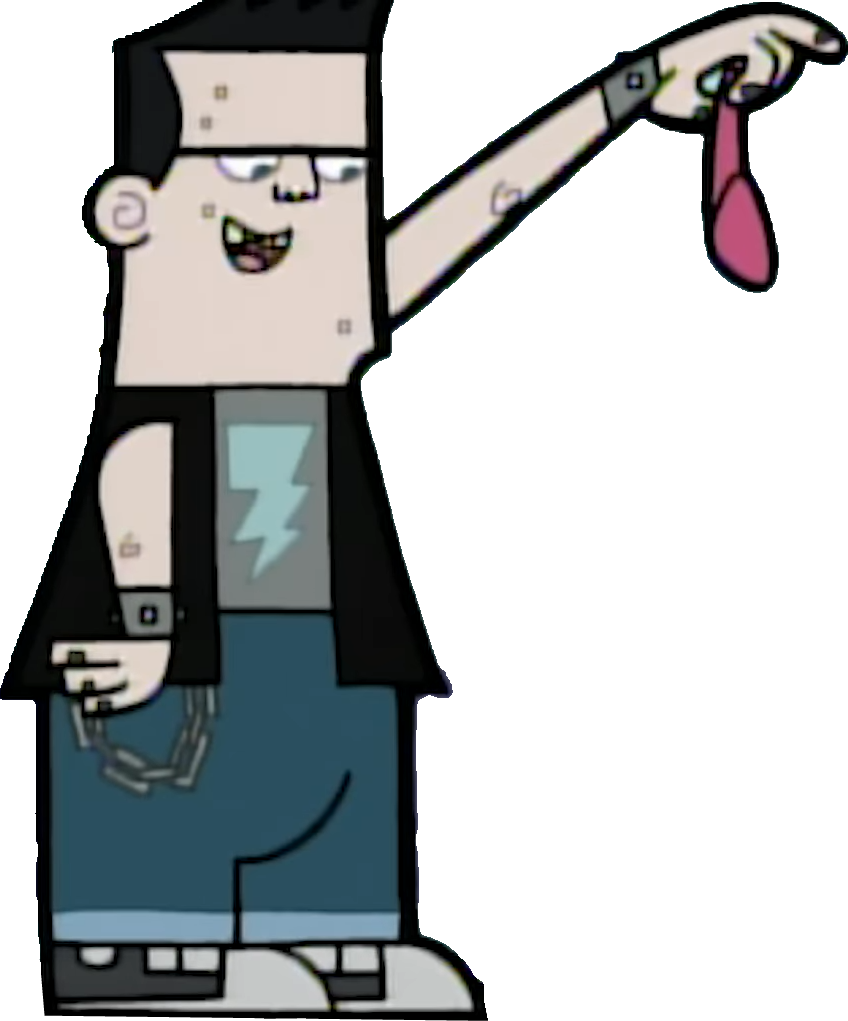
Francis

Francis (voiced by Faith Abrahams) is a gray-skinned school bully with a broken tooth dressed in ragged clothes. He is another one of Timmy's enemies, who enjoys pummeling him and his friends.

==== Anti-fairies ====
The anti-fairies, as their name suggests, are the evil opposite of fairies. The anti-fairies are responsible for all the bad luck on earth and, according to Cosmo, Friday the 13th is their "Christmas". Each fairy has an anti-fairy counterpart, who is their opposite in both personality and morality.

Anti-Cosmo (Daran Norris) is portrayed as a cynical, evil, sadistic, and intelligent anti-fairy with a British accent, and is hinted to be the leader of the anti-fairies, while Anti-Wanda (Susanne Blakeslee), is portrayed as a dumb, hillbilly fairy who eats with her feet.

The anti-fairies reside in Anti-Fairy World, an enclosed environment within Fairy World, first shown as a chamber with a gate guarded by Jorgen. After Timmy accidentally set them free on Earth, Anti-Fairy World was turned into a prison-styled containment facility, where residents live in cells and wear suits preventing them from using magic. The high levels of security were still deemed penetrable, due in part to a specific group effort to get Anti-Cosmo out of Anti-Fairy World to be used as a donor for an operation. The anti-fairies serve as the main villains of The Jimmy Timmy Power Hour 2: When Nerds Collide, Fairly OddBaby, and Fairy Oddlympics. They are fairly important villains early in the series but have made few appearances after Poof is introduced.

Anti Sparky is the evil version of Sparky who appeared in the episode "Man's Worst Friend". Unlike Sparky who is stupid yet very loyal and friendly, Anti Sparky is smart and takes advice from nobody.

==== Foop / Irep ====
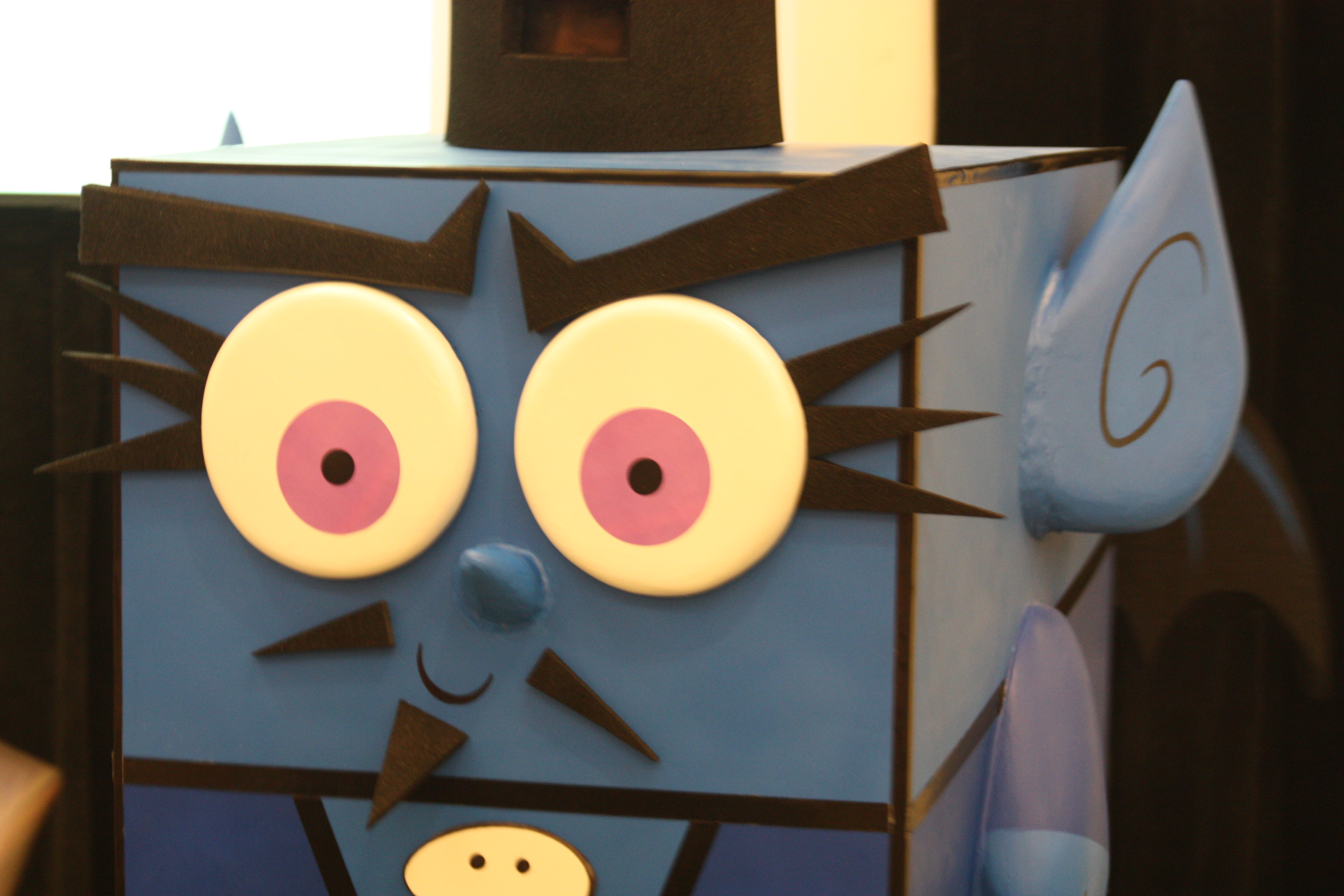
A Foop costume presented at the Fairly OddParents panel with Butch Hartman.

"Foop" Elkniwirep "Irep" Anti-Cosma-Anti-Fairywinkle (voiced by Eric Bauza, portrayed by Scott Baio in A Fairly Odd Summer), is the evil counterpart of Poof and the son of Anti-Cosmo and Anti-Wanda. Because Poof is so nice and attracts so much positive attention, Foop is portrayed as evil and extremely jealous of his counterpart. Foop wants nothing but to destroy Poof, and he cares not for anyone who gets in his way. Unlike Poof, who causes bad things to happen when he cries, Foop's cry causes good things to happen.

Foop resembles Poof, but he is shaped like a cube rather than a ball. He also has a black mustache and goatee. Foop has bat wings and a black crown, and his wand is a baby bottle with bat wings on the side. He also speaks with a stereotypical British gentleman accent.

==== Pixies ====
Pixies are similar to fairies but have a much more corporate attitude toward magic than fairies do. As such, they have square physical features, utilize mobile phones instead of wands, dress in greyscale suits with cone-shaped hats, speak in a monotone drone (provided by Ben Stein), require that wishes be submitted for approval by filling out multiple forms, and have a general disregard for anything fun or exciting that does not fit into the pixie mentality. Their homeworld is a business called Pixies, Inc., and their leader is referred to as the Head Pixie, or H.P. (a caricature of Stein himself), with a pixie called Sanderson as his second-in-command. When they warp from place to place, Pixies use "ping" clouds instead of the fairies' traditional "poof" clouds. They usually attempt to take over Fairy World and replace all fairies with pixies using elaborate business schemes.

==== Dr. Bender ====
Dr. Bender (voiced by Gilbert Gottfried in Seasons 1-3; Butch Hartman in Season 5) is an evil dentist. He has an obsession with perfect teeth, wears dentures that keep his mouth in a perpetual smile, and is intolerant toward anyone who does not have quality teeth. His son, Wendell (also voiced by Gilbert Gottfried and later Butch Hartman), is almost identical to his father in appearance and is also tooth-hygienic, but hates seeing his father scare other children. Dr. Bender enjoys performing pointless procedures on children's teeth and encourages children to eat refined sugar and other sweets to boost his business.

==== Dark Laser ====
Dark Laser (voiced by Kevin Michael Richardson) is a science fiction villain character who is first seen as an image of a catalog toy before Timmy brings him to life in "Hard Copy". Originally a guest, he becomes a recurring villain in the sixth season. He is an obvious parody of Darth Vader from the Star Wars film series. He is often seen carrying his mechanical toy dog Flipsy, whom Timmy brings into the real world before him (although not alive) and whose backflipping function always makes him giggle.

==== Norm the Genie ====
Norm (voiced by Norm Macdonald in the series and by Robert Cait in "Fairy Idol") is a jinn/genie tired of being bound to his lava lamp, into which he must return after being released and granting three wishes to his releaser. While there are no rules limiting what wishes he can grant, he twists the spirit of wishes to subvert his master's expectations, similar to a traditional genie in religion and folklore. His weakness is a substance referred to as "smoof", which his lamp is made of. After Timmy outsmarts him in his first appearance, he colludes with Crocker in his second appearance to get revenge on Timmy. In the special episode "Fairy Idol", he formulates a scheme to become a fairy godparent so he can escape his lamp and sabotages a "Fairy Idol" contest (parodying American Idol) to reach this goal.

==== Princess Mandie ====
Princess Mandie (voiced by Tara Strong) is Mark Chang's terrifying and ugly former fiancée, a barbaric extraterrestrial princess who can be described as psychotically violent. Antagonized by Mark's intimidation about her and his refusal to marry her, Mandie constantly plots revengeful, bloodthirsty murder against him. It was later revealed Mandie never loved Mark and only wanted to marry him as a way of seizing power. Mandie was eventually defeated by Vicky when Timmy and Mark tricked Vicky into attacking her. Afterwards, she was arrested and sent to prison on Yugopatamia.

==== Remy Buxaplenty ====
Remy Buxaplenty (voiced by Dee Bradley Baker) is an archetypical privileged wealthy child, and one of Timmy's rivals. Despite being very rich, Remy is usually unhappy due to his neglectful, wealth-distracted parents, which is the reason why he has a fairy godparent, Wanda's ex-boyfriend Juandissimo. Both Remy and Timmy are aware of each other's fairy godparents, and Remy continuously tries to remove Timmy's fairies, primarily out of jealousy of not having both fairy and human parents who love him. Other than Timmy, and later, Chloe, he is the only named child in the series with a fairy godparent, though many episodes have featured a cameo of at least one unnamed child with their fairy godparent. His last name is a pun of "Bucks aplenty."

==== Crimson Chin villains ====
The enemies of the Crimson Chin that threaten Chincinnati.

- The Bronze Kneecap (voiced by Dee Bradley Baker) is the archenemy of the Crimson Chin and the founder of the Body of Evil. His origin story is explained in the episode "The Masked Magician": he was born Ron Hambone, a jai alai player famous for his numerous third-place wins. At one point, he was about to claim a first-place win for the first time, only to trip over the Crimson Chin's eponymous chin and break one of his knees. This led him to melt his trophies into a bronze cast suit of armor, inspiring his villain name. His particular ability involves shooting various weapons out of the kneecap pieces of his suit.
- The Nega Chin (voiced by Jay Leno) is the evil twin of the Crimson Chin, who possesses the same powers. He wears a dark gray costume instead of red, has pointed teeth and red eyes, and has a no symbol over the C logo on his chin.
- H_{2}Olga (voiced by Susanne Blakeslee) is a water-based villain in the Crimson Chin comics, who becomes more powerful when she absorbs more water. She speaks with a Russian accent.
- The Gilded Arches (voiced by Rob Paulsen) is a former child film actor who crushes theaters with his gigantic, golden legs and feet, his only body parts that grew during puberty. He is very fond of disco and has a golden tooth. He appears in both the Crimson Chin webcomics, in which he tried to destroy any and all theaters that no longer showed his films (including the Someguy Asian-American Theater due to them never allowing Arches to put his feet in their cement) and the video game Breakin' da Rules, in which he steals the Chin's speed.
- The Titanium Toenail is a villain in the Crimson Chin comics. He has the ability to shoot from his helmet sharp projectiles shaped like toenail clippings, which can cut through metal.
- The Iron Lung is a metal-based villain in the Crimson Chin comics. He is a robotic enemy that uses the power of wind, which he uses to blow heavy gusts at his enemies as well as vacuum anything in his path.
- The Golden Gut is a villain in the Crimson Chin comics. His stomach is made of weighted metal, which extends from his body and rams into his adversaries.
- The Copper Cranium is a villain in the Crimson Chin comics, who wears a helmet with a giant, spring-loaded extra skull that can punch through obstacles.
- Brass Knuckles (voiced by Dee Bradley Baker) a.k.a. Coslo Puncholowski, is a hand-to-hand combat villain who has attempted to defeat the Crimson Chin in battle. As his name indicates, he has thick brass knuckles which enable him to punch through walls.
- Spatula Woman (voiced by Grey DeLisle) is a woman who uses a giant red spatula to squish her enemies. She makes her first appearance in the segment "Chin Up!", where she first encounters Cleft. She returned in the video game Breakin' Da Rules as the villain who stole the Crimson Chin's charisma.
- Short-Fuse is a short-statured, bomb-themed villain in the Crimson Chin comics. As his name suggests, he is distinguished by his short stature and temper, which lights the fuse on the hat he wears; and he literally explodes when others call him names related to his size.
- Country Boy is a villain who throws deadly "pig grenades".

==== The Darkness ====
The Darkness (voiced by Dee Bradley Baker) is an ancient entity that has existed for millennia and the main antagonist in the first two thirds of the "Wishology" trilogy. It was first encountered by the Ancient Fairy Warriors. Only when the fairies combined their powers to neutralize the Darkness by using its natural enemy, light, did they manage to stop the Darkness completely. In "Wishology", the Darkness returns, seeking out the Chosen One prophesied to stop it: Turbo Thunder (voiced by Brendan Fraser), a superhero who resembles Timmy. In "Wishology 3: The Final Ending", the Darkness' true intentions are revealed: it only wants to alleviate its lonely existence by making friends, but it frightens everyone on almost every planet it visits. Together, Timmy, Turbo Thunder, and their friends transform the Darkness into a light being called "The Kindness".

==== The Eliminators ====
The Eliminators are robots that serve as The Darkness's henchmen. They are a parody of the iconic action film character the Terminator. They have the power to absorb any weapons and gain its fire power, and after acquiring Fake-a-fires from Yugopotamia, can change their appearance to match anyone or anything. Throughout the "Wishology" trilogy the main Eliminator, characterized by his leather jacket and sunglasses, becomes obsessed with eliminating Timmy after many failed attempts. In "Wishology 3: The Final Ending", he splits from the Darkness after it orders him to keep Timmy alive, and absorbs first Jorgen's wand, then an arsenal of weapons to become "The Destructinator". The Destructinator then uses his magic to transform the Earth into his own, mechanical, planet with the inhabitants his servants. The Destructinator orders for the planet to be filled with explosives that will be launched at The Darkness by a small detonator in an attempt to destroy it himself. After Timmy frees the Fairies from the Darkness, he engages The Destructinator in combat, only to be beaten, but Timmy then tricks The Destructinator into absorbing all the explosives from the planet, which Timmy then detonates, obliterating The Destructinator for good. At the end of the episode, The Darkness (now reformed as The Kindness) releases a new Eliminator (now a friendly "Hug-inator") to free everyone that was trapped inside it.

== Introduced in The Fairly OddParents: A New Wish ==
=== Hazel Wells ===
Hazel Wells
- First appearance: "Fly"; The Fairly OddParents: A New Wish; May 17, 2024
- Created by: Ashleigh Crystal Hairston and Lindsay Katai
- Voiced by: Ashleigh Crystal Hairston

In-universe information
- Full name: Hazel Antoinette Wells
- Species: Human
- Gender: Female
- Occupation: Student
- Family: Cosmo and Wanda (godparents); Angela and Marcus Wells (parents); Antony Wells (brother)
- Nationality: American

Hazel Antoinette Wells (voiced by Ashleigh Crystal Hairston) is the protagonist of The Fairly OddParents: A New Wish, a spunky 10-year-old African American girl with unique interests whose family just moved to Dimmadelphia so her dad could start a new job. She ends up crossing paths with Cosmo and Wanda, who come out of retirement to be her godparents. Hazel is described as fun, curious and highly imaginative, because of her parents' jobs and lifestyles, she is intellectual and overthinks things. At the start of the series, she is very shy and introverted due to her family's moving and her older brother's leaving for college, which is the reason Cosmo and Wanda decide to become her fairy godparents, and as the series goes on, Hazel comes out of her shell. Hazel's interests include rocks, French fries, scary movies and the manga "Prime Meridian", which focuses on a half-man, half-fish character named "Kennueth of the Meridian".

=== Wells Family ===
- Marcus Wells (voiced by Asante Jones): Hazel's father, who is a university professor studying paranormal occurrences. His family moved to Dimmadelphia so he could work in the Galax Institute. Unlike Timmy and his parents, Marcus and his wife do not neglect Hazel and she has a good relationship with them. Marcus's research for the paranormal sometimes nearly gets him into discovering the existence of fairies, so Hazel has to interfere in order to prevent her secret from being revealed.
- Angela Wells (voiced by Jentel Hawkins): Hazel's mother, who is a published psychiatrist. Unlike Timmy and his parents, Angela and her husband do not neglect Hazel and she has a good relationship with them, but when Angela tries to help her daughter with her problems, she often forgets Hazel is still a child and will often handle the situation as if Hazel is a grown up, just like she does with her patients. Angela works in her own private therapy program called the "Be Wells Method", as well as having published books about it and has her own therapy app for it.
- Antony Wells (voiced by AJ Beckles): Hazel's older brother, who is currently attending college away from their family. For the first episodes of the series, he is only mentioned by Hazel, but later makes his physical debut at the end of the episode "The Treble with Rivals". Hazel describes Antony as her best friend, the two siblings are very close. Antony is kind-hearted, smart and cares for his family deeply, and has been close to Hazel since they were younger.

=== Dimmadelphia children ===
- Jasmine Tran (voiced by Merk Nguyen) is a character from The Fairly OddParents: A New Wish and one of Hazel's best friends. Jasmine is a short Vietnamese girl and the first friend Hazel made after moving to Dimmadelphia. Jasmine is chipper and friendly, and loves to sing, although she is not good at it. She is also scared of many things, including spiders, dolls, Swiss cheese, ticking and heights.
- Winn Harper (voiced by iris menas (Note: menas has specified they prefer the use of lowercase letters when their name is written.)) is a character from The Fairly OddParents: A New Wish and one of Hazel's best friends. Winn is a non-binary classmate whom Hazel and Jasmine meet when Hazel invites them to a slumber party. Winn is considered "cool" and is very popular at school, but they are very friendly, as well as confident and easygoing. They love skateborading, to the point they call their skateboard "Board-tholomew"
- Devin "Dev" Dimmadome (voiced by Kyle McCarley), is a character from The Fairly OddParents: A New Wish, being initially an antagonist to Hazel, then becoming her friend, but then returning to an antagonist. Dev is the son of millionaire Dale Dimmadome and grandson of legendary business tycoon Doug Dimmadome, owner of the Dimmsdale Dimmadome (both characters from the original series). Dev loves technology and is often seen with many drones flying around him. He debuts as a spoiled rich kid who makes fun of Hazel in the first episodes, but then it is later revealed that he is lonely because his father doesn't care for him like a father should, and eventually softens up and becomes friends with Hazel. The two friends have a falling-out in "Lost and Founder's Day", and at the end of the episode, Poof (now a grown up by the name "Peri") becomes Dev's fairy godparent, much to the latter's excitement. On his birthday, Dev finds out his father has been watching Hazel and breaks off their friendship, as well as pushing Peri away. In the Season 1 finale, Dev and Foop (now known as Irep) join forces to conquer Fairy World and steals the power chip on the Big Wand, but when finding out his father still does not show interest in him even after his victory, Dev gives the power chip back to Hazel so she could restore Fairy World. As a consequence of his actions, Dev and his father have their memories about the fairies (including Peri) erased.
- Whispers Fred (voiced by Marcus Montgomery), is one of Hazel's classmates.
