= A Fairly Odd Christmas =

2012 American film directed by Steve Holland

- Movie poster
- Genre: Comedy; Fantasy; Christmas films
- Based on: The Fairly OddParents by Butch Hartman
- Screenplay by: Butch Hartman; Savage Steve Holland
- Story by: Butch Hartman; Ray DeLaurentis; Will Schifrin
- Directed by: Savage Steve Holland
- Starring: Drake Bell; Daniella Monet; Tara Strong; Tony Cox; Daran Norris; Teryl Rothery; Travis Turner; Devyn Dalton; Donavon Stinson
- Theme music composer: Guy Moon
- Country of origin: United States
- Original language: English

Production
- Producers: Scott McAboy; Fred Seibert; Marjorn Cohn; Lauren Levine; Butch Hartman
- Cinematography: Gordon Verheul
- Editor: Anita Brandt-Burgoyne
- Running time: 66 minutes
- Production companies: Billionfold Inc. Frederator Studios; Pacific Bay Entertainment; Nickelodeon Productions

Original release
- Network: Nickelodeon
- Release: November 29, 2012

Related
- A Fairly Odd Movie: Grow Up, Timmy Turner! A Fairly Odd Summer

A Fairly Odd Christmas (also known as A Fairly Odd Movie 2) is a 2012 American live-action/animated Christmas comedy television film, serving as the sequel to A Fairly Odd Movie: Grow Up, Timmy Turner! (2011) and the second film in The Fairly OddParents film series. The film was directed by Savage Steve Holland and written by Holland and Butch Hartman from a story by Hartman, Ray DeLaurentis, and Will Schifrin.

A Fairly Odd Christmas premiered on Nickelodeon on November 29, 2012, to 4.473 million viewers. The film was released on Region 1 DVD on December 17, 2013, and was released on Blu-ray on December 4, 2015.

== Plot ==
A few days before Christmas, Santa Claus and the elves check who is naughty and who is nice, only to discover that people's names are being removed from the nice list as a result of Timmy granting them wishes. A pair of elves, Christmas Carol and Dingle Dave, escort Timmy, his fairies, and Tootie to a meeting with Santa at his workshop, who explains that Timmy should stop granting wishes. Just then, an elf tells him that the gift wrapping machine is broken. When Santa wishes for it to be fixed, Timmy decides to grant it. However, since fairy magic does not work in "an elf-made building", the magic instead turns into a blast that causes Santa to fall into the machine and hit his head, giving him amnesia. As a result of a lack of Christmas spirit, the workshop malfunctions and shuts down.

Jorgen Von Strangle arrives and tells Timmy that he must take on the role of Santa, since the rules state a godchild must take over the role of a holiday icon if the godchild has harmed them to the extent that they cannot do their job. However, an elf explains that Timmy cannot be Santa since he is on the naughty list for granting wishes that messed up Santa’s nice list, and Cosmo, Wanda, Poof, and Jorgen cannot change that since Earth's magnetic polarity at the North Pole nullifies fairy magic. The elves explain that to get his name off the naughty list, he must speak to Elmer the Elder Elf. They explain that it is a very dangerous path and that he may not make it out alive. Timmy insists going alone, since this is his problem, however, Tootie, the fairies, two elves, and even Mr. Crocker (who came to get his name off the naughty list) decide to tag along.

The journey proves to be difficult, especially when the elves lose the path to Elmer. Timmy and Crocker are separated from the others by a snowstorm. Tootie, the fairies and the elves come across a penguin, who guides them to a bridge leading them to Elmer. Meanwhile, Timmy and Crocker come across a group of gingerbread men named GingerFred, GingerEd, GingerNed and GingerJed, who are willing to help them. Just then, a starving Crocker bites off GingerJed's head, enraging the gingerbread men who chase them instead. The two eventually reach the other five and they escape and camp for the night. The following day, they come across the bridge, which is heavily damaged. The fairies help the others over, however, the still vengeful gingerbread men come, and in an attempt to get Crocker over, Timmy falls down, but manages to clamber back up the cliff using candy canes as ice axes given to him earlier by Santa.

Upon arriving at Elmer's house, Timmy asks Elmer why he is on the naughty list when he has been granting wishes for others. Elmer explains that with his fairies granting wishes for others, the wishes are causing more bad than good. Having proven his point, Elmer refuses to take Timmy's name off the naughty list, leaving Timmy and the others upset that they could not fix Christmas. Crocker opens up to Timmy and explains that he respects him for having the courage to risk his life for Christmas. Overhearing this, and surprised that Timmy was able to even warm Crocker's heart, Elmer changes his mind and takes Timmy's name off the naughty list.

Timmy and the others then take Elmer's vehicle to get back to the workshop, but realize that without Christmas spirit, the evil Winter Warlock (negativity and depression) has covered the whole planet. The elves explain that Timmy has a very small chance of saving Christmas now that Winter Warlock has blocked the path out of the North Pole. Timmy quickly puts on Santa's clothing, restoring power to the workshop, and gives orders to everyone else to prepare all the gifts. When they are ready, they find that all of the reindeer are missing (as Crocker unintentionally released them in an attempt to stay hidden). Using the magic van as a substitute, they manage to make it through Winter Warlock's Wrath and give presents to everyone.

On Christmas Day, Santa regains his memory and realizes that Timmy has saved Christmas. Despite not getting off the naughty list, Crocker gets his first-ever Christmas present (a new tie that looks exactly like the one he already has, which he loves) and Timmy and Tootie kiss under the mistletoe. Poof flies up to the screen and says "God bless us, everyone." Wanda assures the audience that no fairies were harmed in the making of this movie, but Cosmo says he got a paper cut. The film ends with Mr. Turner finally getting a pony who poops ice cream.

== Cast ==
- Drake Bell as Timmy Turner
- Daniella Monet as Tootie
- David Lewis as Denzel Crocker
- Daran Norris as Cosmo (voice), Mr. Turner
- Susanne Blakeslee as Wanda (voice)
- Tara Strong as Poof (voice)
- Teryl Rothery as Mrs. Turner
- Mark Gibbon as Jorgen Von Strangle
- Travis Turner as Dingle Dave
- Devyn Dalton as Christmas Carol
- Tony Cox as Elmer the Elder Elf
- Devon Weigel as Vicky
- Donavon Stinson as Santa Claus
- Dalila Bela as Jingle Jill
- Olivia Steele-Falconer as Katie
- Butch Hartman as Christmas Caroler, GingerFred, GingerEd, GingerNed and GingerJed

== Production ==
Twenty days after the premiere of A Fairly Odd Movie: Grow Up, Timmy Turner! on Nickelodeon, The Fairly OddParents creator and film writer Butch Hartman tweeted that he was working on ideas for a sequel to Grow Up, Timmy Turner! On March 14, 2012, during Nickelodeon's 2012-2013 Upfront, the aforementioned sequel film was announced.

A Fairly Odd Christmas was filmed in Vancouver, British Columbia, Canada, from March 23 to April 18, 2012. On November 8, Columbia Records and Nickelodeon announced the release of the holiday album Merry Nickmas; the album includes a recording of "Santa Claus Is Comin' to Town", by Rachel Crow, which would be featured in A Fairly Odd Christmas. On November 9, TV Guide officially announced that the film would premiere on November 30 and released its first trailer. However, on November 16, Nickelodeon changed the premiere date to November 29, and Nickelodeon's official website for the film released a trailer announcing the new airdate. On November 16, Nickelodeon stated, via Twitter, that they would air the film again on November 30.

== Reception ==
=== Critical response ===
Robert Lloyd of Los Angeles Times gave a positive review, praising the cast for closely capturing the personalities of the animated characters while also noting that the CGI fairies fit well alongside the human actors. Common Sense Media reviewer Emily Ashby rated the series a 3-out-of-5 stars, stating, "A Fairly Odd Christmas is a palatable holiday story that plays well to its greatest strengths -- talented lead actors and a seamless blending of live-action and CGI."

=== Ratings ===
On its original premiere, A Fairly Odd Christmas attracted 4.47 million viewers and received a 0.9 rating on 18–49.

== Accolades ==
Year	Award	Category	Recipient	Result	Ref.
2013	Young Artist Award	Best Performance in a TV Movie, Miniseries, Special or Pilot - Supporting Young Actress	Dalila Bela	Nominated	
2013	Young Artist Award	Best Performance in a TV Movie, Miniseries, Special or Pilot - Supporting Young Actress	Olivia Steele-Falconer	Nominated	

== Sequel ==
In 2013, it was announced there would be a third and final installment, titled A Fairly Odd Summer, with Drake Bell and Daniella Monet reprising their roles. The film aired on August 2, 2014.

== See also ==
- List of Christmas films
