= Mark Gibbon =

Canadian television, film and voice actor

- Occupation: Actor
- Years active: 1993–present

Mark Gibbon is a Canadian television, film and voice actor known for his distinctive deep voice.

== Filmography ==
=== Film ===
Year	Title	Role	Notes
1994	Road to Saddle River	Fightin' Cowboy	
1999	Y2K	MP#2	
2000	Epicenter	Guard	
2000	The 6th Day	Security Guard	
2000	1132 Pleasant Street	Frank	
2001	3000 Miles to Graceland	Boise Cop	
2003	Barely Legal	Bouncer #1	
2004	The Chronicles of Riddick	Irgun	
2005	Tetsujin 28: The Movie	Velanade	English version; voice
2006	Ghost in the Shell: S.A.C. 2nd GiG	Boma	English version; voice
2006	Everything's Gone Green	Rory	
2007	Battle in Seattle	Squad Leader	
2008	Joy Ride 2: Dead Ahead	Rusty Nail	
2008	At Jesus' Side	Casius	
2011	Thor: Tales of Asgard	Additional voice	
2012	Underworld: Awakening	Announcing Guard	
2013	The Package	Jake	
2013	Man of Steel	Roughneck	
2020	A Babysitter's Guide to Monster Hunting	Roscoe	

=== Television ===
Year	Title	Role	Notes
1993	Ordeal in the Arctic	Master Seaman Douglas 'Monty' Montgomery	Television film
1996	The X-Files	Guard	Episode: "Paper Hearts"
1996–1997	Key the Metal Idol	D	5 episodes
1997	Convictions	Guard #2	Television film
1997–2000	The Outer Limits	Bailiff / Male Vorak / Overseer #2	3 episodes
1997–2004	Stargate SG-1	M'zel / Thor	4 episodes
1998	Dead Man's Gun	Carl Goloff	Episode: "Sheep's Clothing"
1998	The Inspectors	Monitoring Guard	Television film
1998	The Crow: Stairway to Heaven	Scarangello	Episode: "Double Take"
1998, 2001	First Wave	Koch / Guard #1	2 episodes
1999	The Net	Bilings	Episode: "Chem Lab"
1999	Assault on Death Mountain	Franz	Television film
1999	Seven Days	CIA Agent	Episode: "The Football"
1999	Spider-Man Unlimited	Nick Fury	Episode: "Worlds Apart: Part 1"
1999	Aftershock: Earthquake in New York	FEMA Leader	2 episodes
1999–2001	NASCAR Racers	Additional voices	26 episodes
2000	Call of the Wild	Tommy / Frenchy Bolare	3 episodes
2000	Hikaru no Go	Mr. Shuhei	Episode 62
2001	Dark Angel	Red Six	2 episodes
2001	Voyage of the Unicorn	Minotaur	2 episodes
2001	The Lone Gunmen	First Guard	Episode: "Pilot"
2001	Return to Cabin by the Lake	Brett	Television film
2001	MegaMan NT Warrior	Raoul	English version; voice
2001, 2010	Smallville	Deputy Gibbon / Sacks' Bodyguard	4 episodes
2002	The Chris Isaak Show	Ted Thomas	Episode: "Chris Isaak Day"
2002	Tokyo Underground	Rou	7 episodes
2002–2003	He-Man and the Masters of the Universe	Badd / Caugar Guard #1 / Baddhra	3 episodes
2003	A Wrinkle in Time	Centaur	Television film
2003	Inuyasha	Ginkotsu / Kyokotsu	9 episodes
2003	X-Men: Evolution	Gauntlet	Episodes: "Target X"
2004	Andromeda	Templar Lieutenant	Episode: "Abridging the Devil's Divide"
2005	Starship Operators	Hernal Nadja	3 episodes
2005	Stargate Atlantis	Constable	Episode: "The Tower"
2005, 2007	The 4400	Security Guard / Aaronson	2 episodes
2006	Shakugan no Shana	Tenmokuikko	3 episodes
2006	Black Lagoon	Fritz Stanford	3 episodes
2006	Fantastic Four: World's Greatest Heroes	The Hulk	Episode: "Hard Knocks"
2006	Totally Awesome	Coach Cutter	Television film
2006	Trapped!	Zlatko	Television film
2006	Merlin's Apprentice	Gare	2 episodes
2007	Flash Gordon: A Modern Space Opera	Tyrus	Episode: "Pride"
2008	Psych	Mark Belleck	Episode: "The Greatest Adventure in the History of Basic Cable"
2008	Mobile Suit Gundam 00	Barack Zinin	4 episodes
2008	Sanctuary	Cabal Agent	Episode: "Revelations, Part 1"
2009	Knights of Bloodsteel	Dragon Eye	2 episodes
2009	Harper's Island	Tommy	Episode: "Bang"
2009	Beyond Sherwood Forest	Little John	Television film
2009–2012	Iron Man: Armored Adventures	The Hulk	3 episodes
2011	Shattered	Dante	Episode: "Key with No Lock"
2011	A Fairly Odd Movie: Grow Up, Timmy Turner!	Jorgen von Strangle	Television film
2011, 2014	Once Upon a Time	Head Troll	2 episodes
2012	Level Up	Barbarian	Episode: "Barbarian"
2012	Continuum	Frank Bono	Episode: "Time's Up"
2012	A Fairly Odd Christmas	Jorgen von Strangle	Television film
2013	Arrow	Ops Leader	Episode: "Keep Your Enemies Closer"
2013	Spooksville	Debt Collector	Episode: "The Wishing Stone"
2014	A Fairly Odd Summer	Jorgen	Television film
2014	Falling Skies	Scorch	2 episodes
2015	The P.I. Experiment	Doug Kell	Television film
2016	The 100	Bounty Hunter / Grounder #1	2 episodes
2017	Rogue	Donahue	Episode: "The Determined and the Desperate"
2017	My Little Pony: Friendship Is Magic	Hard Hat	Episode: "Fluttershy Leans In"
2017	Supergirl	General Zod	Episode: "Nevertheless, She Persisted"
2017	Somewhere Between	Matthew	Episode: "Madness"
2017	Christmas Homecoming	Dean	Television film
2018	Riverdale	Carl	3 episodes
2018	Ice	Zoric	Episode: "Rendezvous with Death"
2018	Zoids Wild	Numb-Lock	2 episodes
2019	Batwoman	Angus Stanton	Episode: "I'll Be Judge, I'll Be Jury"
2020	The Magicians	Yan the Adventurer	Episode: "The Mountain of Ghosts"
2020	Gabby Duran & the Unsittables	Jacked Alien	Episode: "Enter the Dranis: Part Two"
2021	The Stand	Burly Guard #1	2 episodes
2021–present	Home Before Dark	Karl Kurz / The Fixer	8 episodes
2021	The Lost Symbol	Samyaza	4 episodes
2024	The Dragon Prince	The Elder	4 episodes
2025	Percy Jackson and the Olympians	Joe Bob	Episode: "I Play Dodgeball with Cannibals"
2025	Percy Jackson and the Olympians	Chet Jr.	Episode: "We Board the Princess Andromeda"

=== Video games ===
Year	Title	Role	Notes	Source
2003	Mobile Suit Gundam: Encounters in Space	Alpha A. Bate	English version; voice	
2005	Marvel Nemesis: Rise of the Imperfects	The Thing	Voice	
2005	Ghost in the Shell: Stand Alone Complex	Boma	English version; voice	
2005	Devil Kings	Red Minotaur	Voice	
2010	Tom Clancy's Ghost Recon	Captain Hibbard	Voice	
2011	Trinity: Souls of Zill Ơll	Reig, Balor	Voice	
2016	Dead Rising 4	Evos	Voice	
