= The Fairly OddParents shorts =

- Voices of: Mary Kay Bergman; Susanne Blakeslee; Daran Norris; Grey DeLisle; Tara Strong
- Country of origin: United States
- No. of episodes: 10

Production
- Production companies: Frederator Studios; Nickelodeon Animation Studio

Original release
- Network: Nickelodeon
- Release: September 6, 1998 – June 9, 2002

Related
- The Fairly OddParents

The Fairly OddParents originated from a mini-series of 7-minute shorts on the Oh Yeah! Cartoons showcase. The series premiere, appropriately named "The Fairly OddParents!" is the pilot of the series which showcase the debut appearances of Timmy Turner, Cosmo, Wanda, and Vicky.

== Episodes ==
Every short was written, storyboarded and directed by series creator Butch Hartman. Zac Moncrief co-boarded "Too Many Timmys!", Bob Boyle co-boarded "Party of Three!", Sean Bishop co-board "The Fairy Flu!" and Steve Marmel and Mike Bell co-wrote "Super Humor".

No.	Title	Story by	Original release date	Prod. code
1	"The Fairly OddParents!"	Butch Hartman	September 6, 1998	YEA−627
10-year-old Timmy Turner is left alone by his parents with a cruel babysitter, Vicky. After being sent to his room early, beaten and miserable from Vicky's treatment, Timmy throws his Magic 9-Ball against the wall in frustration, releasing a pair of wish-granting fairy godparents named Cosmo and Wanda, who help him retaliate against Vicky.
2	"Too Many Timmys!"	Butch Hartman	September 18, 1999	YEA−719
Having been left alone with a demanding, "injured" Vicky babysitting him and using him as a servant, Timmy wishes up a bunch of clones to do his chores for him. However, when they scare Vicky out of her mind and chaos ensues, Timmy must recover them and wish them away.
3	"Where's the Wand?"	Butch Hartman, Zac Moncrief & Bob Boyle	September 18, 1999	TBA
While Timmy, Cosmo, and Wanda are playing "Greenbeard," Wanda's wand accidentally ends up with Vicky. She uses Wanda's wand as a prop for her fairy costume at her costume party, and Timmy needs to get back the wand since it is granting Vicky's wishes.
4	"Party of Three!"	Butch Hartman	October 16, 1999	YEA−717
Vicky tries to get proof of Timmy having a party while Mom and Dad are out, but fails miserably.
5	"The Fairy Flu!"	Mike Bell	October 30, 1999	YEA−720
Timmy has been invited to Tootie's birthday party, but has to take Cosmo and Wanda along because the former has the fairy flu and he cannot leave them unattended. Unfortunately, Cosmo's constant sneezing wreaks havoc upon Tootie, Vicky, the party guests and Timmy himself. Things appear to be at their worst when Wanda becomes sick and begins sneezing as well, which turns Vicky into a fire-breathing dragon, until Timmy and Tootie manage to feed them sauerkraut.
6	"The Temp!"	Butch Hartman & Steve Marmel	November 13, 1999	YEA−725
Timmy gets a substitute godparent while Cosmo and Wanda are at boot camp, but the substitute, Jeff, can only make toys; it turns out that Jeff is a runaway elf from the North Pole.
7	"The Zappys!"	Butch Hartman & Steve Marmel	November 20, 1999	TBA
Timmy, Cosmo, and Wanda are nominated for a fairy award show, but Jorgen Von Strangle, the toughest fairy in the universe, uses his power to persuade the judges not to let the fairies win.
8	"Scout's Honor"	Butch Hartman & Steve Marmel	April 6, 2002	TBA
Timmy tries to earn his "Capturing a Mythical Creature" Squirrelly Scout badge; Vicky tortures her scout group.
9	"Super Humor"	Butch Hartman, Steve Marmel & Mike Bell	June 6, 2002 (Nicktoons)	TBA
Wanting to be a superhero, Timmy tests out superpowers on himself.
10	"The Really Bad Day!"	Butch Hartman & Steve Marmel	June 9, 2002 (Nicktoons)	TBA
For one day in a certain number of years, a fairy godparent has to be "bad", and it is Cosmo's turn to do so. However, he fails miserably at doing so, and Timmy and Wanda enlist Genghis Khan in an attempt to help him. However, this leads to Cosmo attempting to destroy the Earth.

== Other shorts ==
Nickelodeon showed the first three Crimson Chin webisodes compiled with all of the Oh Yeah! Cartoons shorts as well with "Where's the Wand?". When the Oh Yeah! Cartoons shorts were rerun, Mary Kay Bergman's Timmy voice was redubbed by Tara Strong, due to Bergman's death. However, these shorts have stopped airing after the television special US premiere of The Big Superhero Wish in February 2004. The original shorts with Mary Kay Bergman as Timmy Turner are available on DVD.

== Home media ==
- "The Fairly OddParents!" and "Where's the Wand?" on the School's Out! The Musical DVD.
- "Too Many Timmys!," "The Fairy Flu," and "The Temp" on The Jimmy Timmy Power Hour 2: When Nerds Collide DVD.
- "Scout's Honor," "The Really Bad Day!" and "Super Humor" on the Fairy Idol DVD.
- "Party of Three" and "The Zappys" on The Jimmy Timmy Power Hour 3: The Jerkinators DVD.
