= A Fairly Odd Movie: Grow Up, Timmy Turner! =

2011 television film directed by Savage Steve Holland

- Film poster
- Genre: Romantic comedy Fantasy
- Based on: The Fairly OddParents by Butch Hartman
- Written by: Butch Hartman; Scott Fellows
- Directed by: Savage Steve Holland
- Starring: Drake Bell; Daniella Monet; Steven Weber; Jason Alexander; Cheryl Hines; Teryl Rothery; Daran Norris; Susanne Blakeslee; Tara Strong; David Lewis; Mark Gibbon; Randy Jackson
- Music by: Guy Moon
- Country of origin: United States
- Original language: English

Production
- Producers: Scott McAboy; Fred Seibert; Marjorn Cohn; Lauren Levine; Butch Hartman
- Cinematography: Jon Joffin
- Editors: Anita Brandt-Burgoyne; Damon Fecht
- Running time: 61 minutes
- Production companies: Billionfold, Inc. Frederator Studios; Pacific Bay Entertainment; Nickelodeon Productions

Original release
- Network: Nickelodeon; TeenNick
- Release: July 9, 2011

Related
- A Fairly Odd Christmas

A Fairly Odd Movie: Grow Up, Timmy Turner! (or simply known as A Fairly Odd Movie) is a 2011 American live-action/animated teen comedy television film based on the animated series The Fairly OddParents. It first aired on Nickelodeon in the United States on July 9, 2011, to celebrate the series' tenth anniversary. Unlike the previous animated films of the series, this film is live-action with CGI animation. The television film was viewed by 5.8 million viewers during its original airing.

Serving as an epilogue to the series, the film centers on the originally 10-year-old protagonist Timmy Turner, who is now age 23 but continues living like a child to keep his fairy godparents, who are required per the fairy rulebook to leave when a godchild starts behaving like an adult. When Timmy falls in love with Tootie, an awkward girl who has since grown into an attractive woman, he risks losing his fairies. Meanwhile, oil tycoon Hugh J. Magnate, Jr., teams up with Timmy's fairy-obsessed teacher Denzel Crocker and plans to use Timmy's fairies' magic to promote his oil business.

The film was released on Region 1 DVD by Nickelodeon Studios on July 11, 2011. The television film was released on Blu-ray on December 4, 2015.

On March 14, 2012, Nickelodeon announced a sequel to the film, A Fairly Odd Christmas, which premiered during 2012's holiday season, while a third film, A Fairly Odd Summer, premiered on August 2, 2014. Drake Bell, Daniella Monet, and other cast members reprised their roles in both.

== Plot ==
13 years after the original series, Timmy Turner has grown into a 23-year-old man, but maintains a lifestyle of a 10-year-old to keep his fairy godparents, Cosmo and Wanda, and his godbrother, Poof. Timmy's refusal to mature greatly irritates his parents, who desperately encourage him to move out so that they can sell the family house and travel the world; and Jorgen von Strangle, the chief instructor of the Fairy Godparent Academy, who schemes to entice Timmy into giving up his fairies.

One day, Timmy reunites with Tootie, a childhood acquaintance who had an obsessive crush on him for years. Once a socially awkward child, she has grown into a beautiful activist, causing Timmy to fall for her instantly. After Timmy secretly uses wishes to help Tootie protest against the felling of a historic tree by oil tycoon Hugh J. Magnate, Jr., Cosmo and Wanda desperately try to repel Tootie, afraid that Timmy is outgrowing them. Timmy is torn between his love for Tootie and his desire to keep his fairies, which culminates in his hesitating to kiss Tootie. Annoyed, Tootie leaves him, telling him to be more mature.

Meanwhile, Timmy's fairy-obsessed schoolteacher Denzel Crocker teams up with Magnate to kidnap Timmy's fairies and use their magic for their own gain. Magnate deceives and kidnaps Tootie while Crocker captures Cosmo, Wanda and Poof, imprisoning them in a device programmed to use their magic to grant anybody's wishes. However, Magnate betrays Crocker, wishes he falls into a bottomless ballpit, and tortures the fairies by adjusting the wish-granting machine to electrocute them each time a wish is made. Timmy tracks down Magnate at his headquarters, which resembles a children's entertainment center, to rescue his fairies and Tootie. He battles both Magnate, who apparently had a troubled relationship with his father and suffers from his own maturity issues, and a toy robot brought to life with the fairies' magic. Timmy saves his fairies from being destroyed by Magnate as he tells Tootie he loves her and kisses her, but in doing so, he loses ownership of his fairies, who disappear out of containment. Magnate childishly laments losing his source of magic before his secretary Janice inadvertently incapacitates him.

Although Timmy is saddened by Cosmo, Wanda, and Poof's departure, he is happy to be free to finally pursue more mature endeavors, as he had longed to do. Jorgen returns to inform Timmy that, because of his courage, a new law was passed in Fairy World that will now permit him to keep his fairy godparents as long as he only makes unselfish wishes to help others. Tootie, Timmy, and his fairies form a charity organization to grant wishes that will mend all of the world's problems or travesties, flying away in a magical van, which turns around in midair and flies towards the camera. Magnate is sent to a mental hospital after claiming that fairies exist, and Janice becomes the new CEO of the company, turning it into an environmentally-friendly enterprise. Crocker finally falls out of the ball pit onto the Turners' front lawn, where Mr. and Mrs. Turner are "vacationing" to celebrate Timmy moving out, and frustratedly walks away.

== Cast ==
- Drake Bell as Timmy Turner
- Daniella Monet as Tootie
- Steven Weber as Hugh J. Magnate, Jr.
- Daran Norris as Cosmo (Note: Voice role.) and Mr. Turner (Note: Norris reprises his roles from the animated series as these characters, and portrays the latter in live action for the first time.)
  - Jason Alexander as Cosmo's human transformation
- Susanne Blakeslee as Wanda (Note: Blakeslee reprises her role from the animated series as this character.)
  - Cheryl Hines as Wanda's human transformation
- Tara Strong and Randy Jackson as Poof (Note: Strong voices Poof's baby noises, while Jackson voices his first words.)
- Teryl Rothery as Mrs. Turner
- Mark Gibbon as Jorgen Von Strangle
- David Lewis as Denzel Crocker
- Jesse Reid as A.J., one of Timmy's childhood friends
- Chris Anderson as Chester McBadBat, one of Timmy's childhood friends
- Devon Weigel as Vicky, Tootie's older sister and Timmy's babysitter
- Christie Laing as Janice
- Olivia Steele-Falconer as Katie, one of Timmy's classmates along with Howie, Ravi, and Mouse
- Darien Provost as Howie
- Qayam Devji as Ravi
- Diego Martinez as Mouse
- Butch Hartman as Maitre D'
- Serge Houde as the Mayor of Dimmsdale
- Harrison Houde as Hall Monitor
- Nicola Anderson as Real Estate Agent
- Keith Blackman Dallas as Bulldozer Operator
- Lee Tichon as Magnate Goon #1
- Osmond L. Bramble as Magnate Goon #2
- Judith Maxie as Fairy Council Member #1
- John Innes as Fairy Council Member #2
- Raugi Yu as Asian Waiter

== Reception ==
=== Critical response ===
Emily Ashby of Common Sense Media rated the film a 4-out-of-5 stars, stating that the film "brings fans' favorite characters to life in a truly appealing way."

=== Ratings ===
The film attracted 5.8 million viewers on its premiere night. It was also the top-rated broadcast on cable networks for the week ending on July 10, 2011. The film's ratings were the highest for The Fairly OddParents films since its preceding special, Wishology, a trilogy film which attained 4.0 million, 3.6 million, and 4.1 million viewers for its three parts, "The Big Beginning", "The Exciting Middle Part", and "The Final Ending", respectively, during its premiere broadcast on May 1–3, 2009.

== Sequels ==
Twenty days after the film's premiere on Nickelodeon, The Fairly OddParents creator and film writer Butch Hartman tweeted that he was working on ideas for a sequel to Grow Up, Timmy Turner! On March 14, 2012, during Nickelodeon's 2012-2013 Upfront, a sequel to 2011's first live-action TV film was announced. The sequel, titled A Fairly Odd Christmas, aired on November 29, 2012, and, in 2013, it was announced that there would be a third and final installment, titled A Fairly Odd Summer, which aired on August 2, 2014; Drake Bell and Daniella Monet reprised their roles in both.
