= The Fairly OddParents =

American animated television series

- Genre: Comedy; Fantasy
- Created by: Butch Hartman
- Showrunner: Butch Hartman
- Voices of: Tara Strong; Susanne Blakeslee; Daran Norris; Grey DeLisle; Carlos Alazraqui; Maddie Taylor (Note: Credited as Matthew W. Taylor); Kari Wahlgren; Eric Bauza
- Theme music composer: Ron Jones; Butch Hartman
- Opening theme: "The Fairly OddParents"
- Ending theme: "The Fairly OddParents" (instrumental)
- Composer: Guy Moon
- Country of origin: United States
- Original language: English
- No. of seasons: 10
- No. of episodes: 172 (294 segments) (list of episodes)

Production
- Executive producers: Frederator Incorporated: Fred Seibert; Nickelodeon: Butch Hartman; Scott Fellows (seasons 5–6)
- Producers: Randy Saba; Bob Boyle (seasons 2–4); Steve Marmel (seasons 2–5); Ray DeLaurentis (seasons 7–10); Karen Malach (season 10)
- Running time: 11 minutes (segments); 23–48 minutes (full episodes/specials); 73 minutes ("Abra-Catastrophe!" and "Channel Chasers")
- Production companies: Frederator Incorporated; Nickelodeon Animation Studio; Billionfold Inc. (seasons 6–10)

Original release
- Network: Nickelodeon
- Release: March 30, 2001 – November 25, 2006
- Release: February 18, 2008 – September 16, 2016
- Network: Nicktoons
- Release: January 18 – July 26, 2017

Related
- Oh Yeah! Cartoons; The Fairly OddParents: Fairly Odder; The Fairly OddParents: A New Wish

The Fairly OddParents is an American animated television series created by Butch Hartman for Nickelodeon. It follows the adventures of Timmy Turner, a 10-year old boy with two fairy godparents named Cosmo and Wanda who grant him wishes to solve his everyday problems.

The Fairly OddParents originated from shorts aired on Nickelodeon's animation showcase Oh Yeah! Cartoons. Due to their popularity, the shorts were greenlit to become a half-hour series, which premiered on March 30, 2001 and originally ended on November 25, 2006. The show was later revived, airing from February 18, 2008 to September 16, 2016, with production quietly ending that same year. Its remaining episodes aired on Nickelodeon's spinoff network Nicktoons from January 18, 2017 through July 26, 2017. Hartman left Nickelodeon seven months later in February 2018. The show totals up to 172 episodes across ten seasons.

The Fairly OddParents is Nickelodeon's second longest-running animated series, behind SpongeBob SquarePants (1999–present). Additionally, it has gained a total of 11 awards during its 16-year run and spawned a media franchise.

In 2021, it was announced that a spin-off live-action series was in development for Paramount+. The series The Fairly OddParents: Fairly Odder was released in 2022. A sequel series, The Fairly OddParents: A New Wish, was released in 2024.

== Synopsis ==
=== Premise ===
The Fairly OddParents follows Timmy Turner, a 10-year old boy who is neglected by his parents and abused by his teenage babysitter, Vicky. One day, he is granted two fairy godparents, Cosmo and Wanda, who grant his every wish to improve his miserable life. However, these wishes usually backfire badly and cause a series of problems that Timmy must fix. Earlier episodes of the series tend to revolve around Timmy trying to navigate his everyday life at home, at school and elsewhere in town with his friends, Chester and A.J., and occasionally his parents, while also trying to fix a wish gone awry and ultimately, learning a lesson in the end. Later in the series, Timmy wishes that Cosmo and Wanda would have a baby, whom they named Poof. Much later in the series, Timmy gets a pet fairy dog named Sparky. Even later in the series, a new girl named Chloe Carmichael, who loves sharing, animals, and everything that is ecologically friendly, moves into the neighborhood, and Timmy has to share Cosmo and Wanda with her due to a shortage of available fairies.

At the beginning of the series, Vicky was the main antagonist, but as the series progressed, many more villains were introduced. They include Denzel Crocker, Timmy's crazed teacher who wishes to prove to the world that fairies exist; Francis, the school bully; Remy Buxaplenty, a billionaire child who is set on getting rid of Timmy's fairies due to his immense jealousy towards him for having two compared to his one; Juandissimo Magnifico, Wanda's ex and Remy's fairy; Dark Laser, a parody of Darth Vader who wants to destroy Timmy and the Earth; the Anti-Fairies, evil counterparts to fairies with opposite personalities who cause bad luck to humans; the Pixies, who treat their magical powers like a business (e.g. requiring wishes to be approved through paperwork before they're granted); and Norm the Genie, a trickster who hatches plans to gain freedom from his lamp and later to get revenge on Timmy.

=== Setting ===
The Fairly OddParents is set in the fictional city of Dimmsdale, California. Dimmsdale has a sign on some mountains near the city that is a parody of the Hollywood Sign. In the episode "Vicky Loses Her Icky", the Mayor of Dimmsdale unveils the "Welcome to Dimmsdale – Nicest Town on Earth!" sign. However, at the end of the episode, the President of the United States changes the word "Nicest" to "Meanest". Dimmsdale appears to be average-sized, with a downtown containing large buildings, skyscrapers and a city hall, but also containing uptown areas with suburban residences (including the neighborhood where Timmy, his parents and his friends live) and businesses, such as Timmy's school; a hospital; a jail; a sports complex called the Dimmadome, which is named after its founder and owner, Doug Dimmadome, a man who owns a local TV channel and various restaurants and stores, as well as a park in the center of the city. Dimmsdale also appears to have rural farmland located outside of the city. The adults who live in Dimmsdale are notably moronic and often settle situations with things like angry mobs, but they do still manage to form a working and functioning society. In the episode "Which Witch is Which?" it was revealed that Dimmsdale was founded in the 1660s and named after a man called Dale Dimm.

When the show needs to, it switches its location to Fairy World, the home of the fairies, which is a floating world located on top of some clouds, colored with an abundance of pink and purple. Fairy World is depicted as a large metropolis with houses, streets, different kinds of buildings, and skyscrapers. Most buildings in Fairy World have crowns and stars above their roofs. The fairies have a civilization like that of humans, but with their primary source of power being magic, which also keeps their world afloat. A large rainbow acts as the bridge between Fairy World and the Earth, although the bridge seems to exist only for decoration since fairies teleport via magic to and from Earth. Fairy World is not actually a part of Earth but is depicted as a separate world in outer space located near Earth's orbit that can only be accessed by magic. Among the most notable landmarks in Fairy World is the glowing entrance sign on the other side of the rainbow bridge and the giant wand located in the center of Fairy World that powers the fairies' magic. Jorgen Von Strangle, an enormous and tough fairy with an Austrian accent (similar to that of Arnold Schwarzenegger), acts as the leader of the fairies and Fairy World. Jorgen personally dislikes Timmy at the beginning of the series but warms up to him over time.

Another location seen in the show is the city of Chincinnati, the home town of Timmy's favorite comic book superhero, the Crimson Chin. Other locations include the dark and twisted Anti-Fairy World, the dark counterpart of Fairy World where the Anti-fairies reside; the dull and gray metropolis of Pixies Inc., home of the Pixies; and Yugopotamia, another planet where Timmy's alien friend Mark Chang lived until the episode "New Squid in Town!" when Timmy invites Mark to live in the Dimmsdale junkyard in order to escape his evil fiancée, Princess Mandie.

== Voice cast ==
- Tara Strong as Timmy Turner and Poof (seasons 6–10)
- Daran Norris as Cosmo, Mr. Turner and Jorgen Von Strangle
- Susanne Blakeslee as Wanda and Mrs. Turner
- Grey DeLisle as Vicky and Tootie
- Carlos Alazraqui as Denzel Crocker
- Maddie Taylor as Sparky (season 9)
- Kari Wahlgren as Chloe Carmichael (season 10)
- Eric Bauza as Foop (seasons 7–10)

Recurring voice actors include Jim Ward, Rob Paulsen, Dee Bradley Baker, Tom Kenny, Jason Marsden, Jeff Bennett, Dionne Quan, Gary LeRoi Gray, Kevin Michael Richardson, Frankie Muniz, and Ibrahim Haneef Muhammad.

Throughout its run, celebrities who have guest starred on The Fairly OddParents include Adam West, Jay Leno, Norm Macdonald, Mary Hart, Chris Kirkpatrick, Alec Baldwin, Ben Stein, Jackie Mason, Jason Bateman, Laraine Newman, Gilbert Gottfried, Michael Clarke Duncan, Brendan Fraser, Patrick Warburton, Julie Chen Moonves, Gene Simmons, Paul Stanley, Tom Arnold, Dana Carvey, and Scott Hamilton.

== Production history ==
=== Development and Oh Yeah! Cartoons (1997–2001) ===
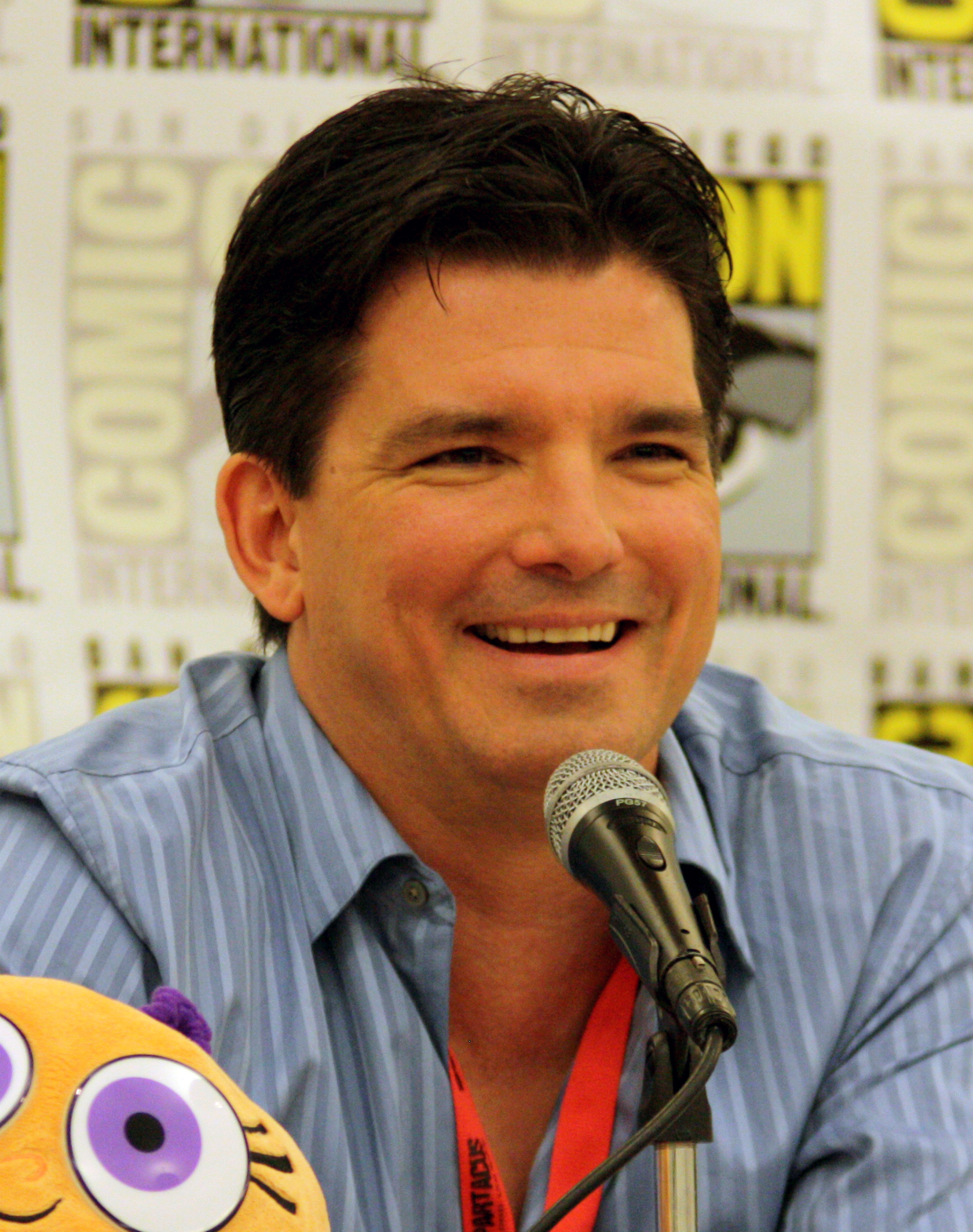
Butch Hartman, the series' creator

A postcard for The Fairly OddParents segment on Nickelodeon's Oh Yeah! Cartoons

Prior to the creation of The Fairly OddParents, Butch Hartman was working at Cartoon Network on Dexter's Laboratory and Johnny Bravo. In December 1997, Fred Seibert contacted Hartman to come over to his new company, Frederator Incorporated, to help pitch ideas as a part of their Oh Yeah! Cartoons series which the studio was developing for Nickelodeon. Hartman initially declined the offer. However, several months later, production on the first season of Johnny Bravo was completed and Hartman decided to create his own series instead of going back to working for other studios.

"I wanted initially to do a boy version of Cinderella. [...] I wanted to do a show with magic so I wouldn't have to worry about coming up with ideas, and sometimes that's the problem, The show just sort of writes itself, and there's often too much to choose from and too many opportunities." — Butch Hartman

Hartman started developing his own series by drawing a picture of a little boy who would become Timmy Turner. Hartman was originally going to name him Mike, after his brother Mike Hartman, but they had a fight that day, so Hartman named him after his other brother Timmy Hartman instead. Hartman wanted Timmy to be able to go anywhere because he never wanted to be stuck for a story transition. Hartman was originally going to give Timmy science powers, but decided against it due to Dexter's Laboratory having recently come out. Instead, he decided to give Timmy a magic friend. He drew Venus (later renamed Wanda) first and then decided, because he had never heard of a fairy godfather before, to draw Cosmo. After coming up with the entire premise for the cartoon in about fifteen minutes, Hartman first pitched the idea to Hanna-Barbera and then to Cartoon Network, both of whom turned it down. Hartman then went back to Seibert at Nickelodeon and successfully pitched it to them for Oh Yeah! Cartoons.

While in early development, the series was titled The Fairy GodParents and then it was briefly changed to Oh My GodParents. Bill Burnett came up with the title The Fairly OddParents, which they ended up sticking with. Hartman originally created The Fairly OddParents as a seven-minute short film, which was one of the thirty-nine short cartoons created for Oh Yeah! Cartoons. Hartman made ten seven-minute short films of The Fairly OddParents in total for Oh Yeah! Cartoons, which aired on Nickelodeon from September 4, 1998, to March 23, 2001. Due to the success of the shorts, Nickelodeon picked up The Fairly OddParents for a full-length series alongside fellow Oh Yeah! Cartoons: ChalkZone and My Life as a Teenage Robot. In January 2000, Nickelodeon ordered seven 23-minute episodes for the series' first season, which premiered on March 30, 2001 (just one week after the final Oh Yeah! short) in the half-hour before fellow Nicktoon Invader Zim made its debut.

Unlike the later series, the animation in the original shorts is not as smooth and the designs are notably different (including Timmy's parents, Mr. and Mrs. Turner, who are only seen from the neck down with their faces hidden in the pilot episodes and appear to be more intelligent than they appeared to be in the proceeding series, yet still easily duped by Vicky's abhorrent actions). Other notable differences include Timmy Turner, who was voiced by Mary Kay Bergman in the Oh Yeah! shorts rather than Tara Strong in the series (Strong would dub over Bergman's dialogue in the Oh Yeah! shorts to establish better continuity). Cosmo is significantly more intelligent than he appears to be in the proceeding series while Wanda is shown to be ditzy. Vicky is also much less evil than in the current series; she has a little brother in the pilot episode before it was changed to a little sister later on in the shorts, and she also calls Timmy by his name as opposed to the more often-used "twerp".

=== Original run (2001–2006) ===
Following its premiere, The Fairly OddParents achieved significant viewership, becoming the second-highest-rated children's program among audiences aged 2–11 on both network and cable television combined, behind SpongeBob SquarePants. The series managed to briefly steal SpongeBob's spot as the number one highest rated children's television program in mid-2003. The Fairly OddParents also attracted a wide audience, appealing to kids as well as to teenagers and adults, with 14.2 million kids 2–11 tuning in each week, 10.8 million adult viewers per week and was the number one series on television among tween audiences (9–14).

On January 24, 2006, Hartman announced on his forum that Nickelodeon had ceased production of the show. The third The Adventures of Jimmy Neutron, Boy Genius crossover, "The Jimmy Timmy Power Hour 3: The Jerkinators!", is the fifth-season finale in production order and was intended to be the series finale, airing on July 21, 2006. However, Nickelodeon broadcast the episode "Timmy the Barbarian!/No Substitute for Crazy!" after "The Jerkinators!" as the fifth-season finale in airing order, on November 25 of that year.

=== Revival (2007–2012) ===
On February 2, 2007, Hartman announced on his forum that Nick granted The Fairly OddParents twenty more episode slots, making sure the show resumed production. Later on July 7, 2007, a special titled 77 Secrets of the Fairly OddParents Revealed hinted that a new character would join the series.

"The addition of baby Poof is something I always wanted to do. I wanted Cosmo and Wanda to have their own kid as opposed to just Timmy. So we came up with the episode Fairly OddBaby and it was one of the highest rated episodes we ever did and we were really thrilled about that." — Butch Hartman

After a one-year hiatus, Nickelodeon announced that they would begin the sixth season, which would consist of twenty episodes alongside the broadcast of a one-hour television film called Fairly OddBaby, which introduced a new character, a baby fairy named Poof, to the main cast of characters. A huge hit, Fairly OddBaby aired on February 18, 2008, and garnered 8.89 million viewers for its premiere; the rebroadcast of the film the following day garnered 4.82 million viewers, making it the number one and ninth most viewed cable broadcast respectively for the week of February 18–24, 2008. From May 1, 2009, to May 3, 2009, the three-part season 6 finale special Wishology aired.

=== Live-action films and end of the series (2011–2017) ===
"I wanted to take the series in an unexpected direction by introducing live-action characters while keeping the integrity of the series' trademark magic through CG animation." — Butch Hartman

To honor the tenth anniversary of The Fairly OddParents, a live-action television film titled A Fairly Odd Movie: Grow Up, Timmy Turner! premiered on July 9, 2011. Written by Butch Hartman, the film is set 13 years after the animated series and stars Drake Bell as a 23-year-old Timmy Turner, who is trying his hardest not to grow up in order to prevent losing his fairy godparents, and Daniella Monet as Tootie, who has grown into a mature and beautiful activist with whom Timmy falls in love. The premiere of the movie attracted 5.8 million viewers and it was the top-rated television broadcast on cable networks for the week of July 10–16, 2011, and ranked as "2011's Top Original TV Movie on Basic Cable with Kids and Total Viewers".

The success of A Fairly Odd Movie: Grow Up, Timmy Turner! spawned two sequels: A Fairly Odd Christmas and A Fairly Odd Summer, which premiered on November 29, 2012, and August 2, 2014 respectively. Drake Bell and Daniella Monet reprised their respective roles in both of the sequels.

The ninth season of The Fairly OddParents began with a television special titled "Fairly OddPet", which premiered on March 23, 2013, and attracted 3.8 million viewers. The ninth season's official run began on May 4, 2013. Season nine introduced a new character, Timmy's pet fairy dog Sparky, to the show's main cast; however, he would be quickly removed the next season. Season nine contained twenty-six episodes, making it the longest season in the series. It is also the first season to be formatted in both high definition and widescreen.

"When you make a show like [The] Fairly OddParents for many, many years, you really have to begin to add things to the show to keep the show fresh. I've had a lot of people send me angry emails asking me why did you add Chloe to the show? Or why did you add Sparky? Or why did you add Poof? And as much as I would love to not upset these people, we have to keep the show fresh. Mainly because sometimes the network, Nickelodeon, wants us to add things and so we add things, but we try to add things in a way that makes the show better, not worse." — Butch Hartman

The tenth season of The Fairly OddParents premiered on January 15, 2016 with the special "The Big Fairy Share Scare!". This episode introduced Chloe Carmichael, Timmy's new neighbor with whom he is forced to share Cosmo and Wanda due to a fairy shortage. The tenth season aired from January 15, 2016, to July 26, 2017, on both Nickelodeon and Nicktoons. The visuals and lyrics for the theme song were changed for season ten in order to include Chloe; however, it still contained the same rhythm and melody as the original theme song. Also in season 10, the show's animation made the transition from traditional animation to Flash animation. The animation for season ten was done by Elliott Animation Studios in Canada, whereas all of the prior seasons were animated by Yeson Animation Studios. The show quietly ended production in 2016, with its final episodes airing a year later.

== Episodes ==
A condensed version of Season 1, Episode 1 "The Big Problem"

Season	Episodes		Segments	Originally released		
Season	Episodes		Segments	First released	Last released	Network
Shorts	10		N/A	September 6, 1998	March 23, 2001	Nickelodeon
1	7		13	March 30, 2001	December 9, 2001	Nickelodeon
2	13		24	March 1, 2002	January 20, 2003	Nickelodeon
3	19		33	November 8, 2002	November 21, 2003	Nickelodeon
4	20		32	November 7, 2003	June 10, 2005	Nickelodeon
5	21		37	July 2, 2004	November 25, 2006	Nickelodeon
6	20		30	February 18, 2008	August 12, 2009	Nickelodeon
7	20		39	July 6, 2009	August 5, 2012	Nickelodeon
8	6		N/A	February 12, 2011	December 29, 2011	Nickelodeon
9	26		43	March 23, 2013	March 28, 2015	Nickelodeon
10	20 (Note: 37 segments total)	9	15	January 15, 2016	September 16, 2016	Nickelodeon
10	20	11	22	January 18, 2017	July 26, 2017	Nicktoons

=== The Adventures of Jimmy Neutron, Boy Genius crossover episodes ===
There have also been three tie-ins with special episode crossovers involving the Nickelodeon computer-animated series The Adventures of Jimmy Neutron, Boy Genius under the title "The Jimmy-Timmy Power Hour" (the first alone, the second and third with the subtitles "When Nerds Collide!" and "The Jerkinators!", respectively); the three main characters from Fairly OddParents meet with the main characters from Jimmy Neutron, Jimmy, Sheen, Carl, Cindy, and Libby, and often cross between each of their worlds of 2D and 3D animation.

== Release ==
=== Broadcast ===
The series aired on the main Nickelodeon channel from March 30, 2001 to November 25, 2006 for its first run and from February 18, 2008 to September 16, 2016 for its second run, later moved to Nicktoons from January 18 to July 26, 2017 with its remaining episodes. After it ended, reruns were sometimes shown on Nicktoons until 2023.

=== Home media ===
There were 8 multi episodes DVD releases, as well as single episodes featured on Nickelodeon compilation DVDs released between 2004 and 2011. The Jimmy Timmy Power Hour DVDs also featured several episodes. The first eight seasons have been released on DVD-R format exclusively through Amazon, starting with the first season in 2009. The TV movie Wishology has its own release on the format, separate from the sixth season's set.

The complete series was released by Paramount Home Entertainment in a 35-disc set on December 10, 2024 (originally scheduled for November 26, 2024). Seasons 9 and 10 also received separate sets to complement the already-existing Amazon releases.

=== Streaming ===
In June 2019, The Fairly OddParents was added to Pluto TV alongside other Nickelodeon/Nick Jr. shows.

As of July 30, 2020, all seasons are available on Paramount+. As of May 2024, Seasons four and five of the show are currently streaming on Netflix in the United States.

== Spin-offs and revivals ==
=== Cancelled spin-off series and film ===
In 2004, Hartman revealed his intentions to make a Crash Nebula spin-off series. The pilot episode "Crash Nebula" was aired as part of the show's fifth season, with the pilot focusing on a young boy named Sprig Speevak (voiced by James Arnold Taylor), who meets various types of strange aliens as he attends a school in outer space, making a few friends and enemies. Nickelodeon decided not to pick up the series.

In 2006, Hartman stated that he was still confident and would try to get the spin-off greenlit in the future. He also wrote a script entitled Crash Nebula: The Movie for Paramount Pictures, but the film was canceled due to its similarities to Disney's Sky High. However, no other news for the Crash Nebula IP has been announced since then, with it remaining as a fictitious television series in The Fairly OddParents that Timmy Turner is a fan of. The episode in the fifth season adds an introduction where Timmy is excited for Sprig's origin story, with Cosmo and Wanda making wild guesses.

=== Live-action spin-off series ===
On February 24, 2021, it was announced that a live-action sequel series was in development and debut on Paramount+. Hartman and Seibert return as producers, while Christopher J. Nowak serve as both executive producer and showrunner. The series started production in July 2021 and premiered on March 31, 2022, with one season.

=== Sequel series ===
In 2023, Nickelodeon & Paramount Global applied to register "The Fairly OddParents: A New Wish" with the USPTO under several NICE classes. A screenwriter from Season 9 of the original series confirmed a new project was in development. On February 23, 2024, further details about the series were revealed, including an impending Netflix debut, the return of Daran Norris and Susanne Blakeslee as Cosmo and Wanda respectively, and the focus on a new main character, Hazel Wells. It premiered on May 20, 2024 on Nickelodeon.

== Reception ==
=== Critical reception ===
Betsy Wallace from Common Sense Media gave the series 3 of 5 stars saying, "Nickelodeon airs some of the most creative and expertly animated cartoons on television, and it has another winner with The Fairly OddParents."

Dennis Cass from Slate Magazine favorably compared the series' writing to that of Animaniacs and praised the series' broad appeal.

Some critics have criticized Nickelodeon's decision to continue production of the show with numerous revivals and spinoffs, and have suggested that what they perceive to be the show's subsequent decline in quality may have hindered the show's lasting legacy. Spencer Bollettieri of Comic Book Resources assessed in 2024: "As the series dragged on and Nickelodeon kept trying to revive it, the quality started to slip, with an overstuffed cast and a string of failed spinoffs, including The Fairly OddParents: Fairly Odder. [...] In the end, The Fairly OddParents proves it's better to leave the party early than be wished to leave."

=== Awards and nominations ===
Year	Award	Category	Nominee(s)	Result	Ref.
2001	29th Annie Awards	Outstanding Achievement for an Animated Production Produced for the Internet	"The Crimson Chin" webisodes	Nominated	
2001	29th Annie Awards	Outstanding Achievement in an Animated Special Project	Main title sequence	Nominated	
2001	29th Annie Awards	Outstanding Achievement in a Primetime or Late Night Animated Television Production	The Fairly OddParents	Nominated	
2001	29th Annie Awards	Outstanding Individual Achievement for Directing in an Animated Television Production	Butch Hartman for episode "Chin Up"	Nominated	
2001	29th Annie Awards	Outstanding Individual Achievement for Music Score an Animated Television Production	Guy Moon	Nominated	
2001	29th Annie Awards	Outstanding Individual Achievement for Voice Acting by a Female Performer in an Animated Television Production	Tara Strong as Timmy Turner	Nominated	
2002	2002 BMI Film & TV Awards	BMI Cable Award	Butch Hartman, Ron Jones, and Guy Moon	Won	
2002	54th Primetime Emmy Awards	Outstanding Music and Lyrics	Butch Hartman, Steve Marmel, and Guy Moon for song "I Wish Every Day Could Be Christmas" from "Christmas Every Day"	Nominated	
2003	30th Annie Awards	Outstanding Music in an Animated Television Production	Guy Moon, Butch Hartman, and Steve Marmel	Nominated	
2003	2003 BMI Film & TV Awards	BMI Cable Award	Butch Hartman, Ron Jones, and Guy Moon	Won	
2003	2003 Golden Reel Award	Best Sound Editing in Television Animation	Michael Warner, Mary Erstad, Matt Corey, and Michael Petak for "Action Packed" and "Smarty Pants"	Nominated	
2003	55th Primetime Emmy Awards	Outstanding Music and Lyrics	Guy Moon, Butch Hartman, and Steve Marmel for song "It's Great to Be a Guy" from "Love Struck"	Nominated	
2003	55th Primetime Emmy Awards	Outstanding Music and Lyrics	Guy Moon, Butch Hartman, and Steve Marmel for song "What Girls Love" from "Love Struck"	Nominated	
2004	31st Annie Awards	Outstanding Storyboarding in an Animated Television Production	Dave Thomas for "Pipe Down"	Won	
2004	31st Annie Awards	Outstanding Achievement in an Animated Television Production	The Fairly OddParents	Won	
2004	2004 BMI Film & TV Awards	BMI Cable Award	Butch Hartman, Ron Jones, and Guy Moon	Won	
2004	2004 Golden Reel Award	Best Sound Editing in Television Animation	Robert Poole II, Mary Erstad, and Matt Corey for "The Crimson Chin Meets Mighty Mom and Dyno Dad"	Nominated	
2004	2004 Kids' Choice Awards	Favorite Cartoon	The Fairly OddParents	Nominated	
2004	56th Primetime Emmy Awards	Outstanding Music and Lyrics	Guy Moon, Butch Hartman, and Steve Marmel for song "Wish Come True!" from "Abracatastrophe"	Nominated	
2004	20th TCA Awards	Outstanding Children's Programming	The Fairly OddParents	Nominated	
2005	32nd Annie Awards	Character Design in an Animated Television Production	Benjamin Balistreri for "Crash Nebula"	Nominated	
2005	32nd Annie Awards	Outstanding Writing in a Television Production	Butch Hartman and Steve Marmel for "Channel Chasers"	Nominated	
2005	2005 Kids' Choice Awards	Favorite Cartoon	The Fairly OddParents	Nominated	
2005	57th Primetime Emmy Awards	Outstanding Individual Achievement in Animation	Gordon Hammond for "Shelf Life"	Won	
2006	33rd Annie Awards	Best Character Design in an Animated Television Production	Ernie Gilbert for "The Good Old Days"	Won	
2006	33rd Annie Awards	Best Directing in an Animated Television Production	Gary Conrad for "The Good Old Days"	Nominated	
2006	2006 Kids' Choice Awards	Favorite Cartoon	The Fairly OddParents	Nominated	
2006	2006 Golden Reel Award	Best Sound Editing in Television Animation	Robert Poole II, Mary Erstad, Robbi Smith, Guy Moon, and Craig Ng for "The Good Old Days/Future Lost"	Nominated	
2006	2006 British Academy Children's Awards	International	Butch Hartman, Gary Conrad	Nominated	
2007	34th Annie Awards	Best Animated Television Production	The Fairly OddParents	Nominated	
2007	2007 Kids' Choice Awards	Favorite Cartoon	The Fairly OddParents	Nominated	
2009	36th Annie Awards	Best Storyboarding in an Animated Television Production or Short Form	Butch Hartman for "Mission: Responsible"	Nominated	
2009	2009 Kids' Choice Awards	Favorite Cartoon	The Fairly OddParents	Nominated	
2010	37th Annie Awards	Music in a Television Production	Guy Moon for "Wishology: The Big Beginning"	Won	
2010	37th Annie Awards	Storyboarding in a Television Production	Brandon Kruse for "Fly Boy"	Nominated	
2010	37th Daytime Emmy Awards	Outstanding Sound Mixing – Live Action and Animation	Michael Beiriger and Ray Leonard	Won	
2010	37th Daytime Emmy Awards	Outstanding Individual in Animation	Dave Thomas for "Dadbracadbra"	Won	
2010	37th Daytime Emmy Awards	Outstanding Writing in Animation	William Schifrin, Kevin Sullivan, Ed Valentine, Butch Hartman, Joanna Lewis, Charlotte Fullerton, Amy Keating Rogers, Gary Conrad, Thomas Krajewski, Scott Fellows, and Ray De Laurentis	Nominated	
2010	2010 Golden Reel Award	Best Sound Editing in Television Animation	Heather Olsen, Roy Braverman, Robbi Smith, J. Lampinen, and Mishelle Fordham for "Wishology: The Big Beginning"	Nominated	
2011	38th Annie Awards	Best Storyboarding in an Animated Television Production	Dave Thomas	Nominated	
2012	39th Annie Awards	Voice Acting in a Television Production	Carlos Alazraqui as Denzel Crocker	Nominated	
2012	39th Annie Awards	Voice Acting in a Television Production	Daran Norris as Cosmo	Nominated	
2012	39th Annie Awards	Voice Acting in a Television Production	Tara Strong as Timmy Turner	Nominated	
2012	39th Annie Awards	Writing in a Television Production	Ray De Laurentis, William Schifrin, and Kevin Sullivan for "Invasion of the Dads"	Nominated	
2013	40th Annie Awards	Best Animated Television Production for Children	"Farm Pit"	Nominated	
2013	2013 Kids' Choice Awards	Favorite Cartoon	The Fairly OddParents	Nominated	
2013	Neox Fan Awards	Best Neox Kidz series	The Fairly OddParents	Nominated	
2014	2014 Golden Reel Award	Best Sound Editing in Television Animation	Heather Olsen, Roy Braverman, Robbi Smith and J. Lampinen for "Dumbbell Curve"	Won	
2014	41st Annie Awards	Outstanding Achievement, Voice Acting in an Animated TV/Broadcast Production	Eric Bauza	Nominated	
2014	2014 Kids' Choice Awards	Favorite Animated Animal Sidekick	Sparky	Nominated	
2015	2015 Kids' Choice Awards	Favorite Cartoon	The Fairly OddParents	Nominated	

== Other media ==
A slew of products based on the series were created, released, or built. This includes four video games, three attraction rides, and toys.
