= List of Nickelodeon original films =

A number of television films and long-form special episodes of original television shows have been produced for broadcast on American children's cable network Nickelodeon since 1998 and have been broadcast under the banner "Nickelodeon Original Movie".

== 1990s ==
=== 1998 ===
1. Doom Runners (April 25, 1998)

== 2000s ==
=== 2000 ===
1. New Kids on the Planet (July 8, 2000)
2. Two Heads Are Better Than None (July 15, 2000)
3. Cry Baby Lane (October 28, 2000)
4. CatDog and the Great Parent Mystery (November 25, 2000)

=== 2001 ===
1. As Told by Ginger: Summer of Camp Caprice (July 7, 2001)
2. Rugrats: All Growed Up (July 21, 2001)
3. The Wild Thornberrys: The Origin of Donnie (August 18, 2001)

=== 2002 ===
1. Rocket Power: Race Across New Zealand (February 16, 2002)
2. Globehunters: An Around the World in 80 Days Adventure (December 15, 2002)

=== 2003 ===
1. The Electric Piper (February 2, 2003)
2. Maniac Magee (February 23, 2003)
3. The Fairly OddParents: Abra-Catastrophe! (July 12, 2003)
4. Rocket Power: Reggie's Big (Beach) Break (July 19, 2003)
5. As Told by Ginger: Far from Home (August 9, 2003)

=== 2004 ===
1. The Jimmy Timmy Power Hour (May 7, 2004)
2. The Adventures of Jimmy Neutron: Boy Genius: Win, Lose, and Kaboom (July 9, 2004)
3. Rocket Power: Island of the Menehune (July 16, 2004)
4. The Fairly OddParents: Channel Chasers (July 23, 2004)

=== 2006 ===
1. Drake & Josh Go Hollywood (January 6, 2006)
2. The Jimmy Timmy Power Hour 2: When Nerds Collide (January 16, 2006)
3. The Jimmy Timmy Power Hour 3: The Jerkinators (July 21, 2006)

=== 2007 ===
1. The Naked Brothers Band: The Movie (January 27, 2007)
2. Ned's Declassified School Survival Guide: Field Trips, Permission Slips, Signs and Weasels (June 8, 2007)
3. Shredderman Rules (June 9, 2007)
4. The Last Day of Summer (July 20, 2007)
5. Drake & Josh: Really Big Shrimp (August 3, 2007)
6. Roxy Hunter and the Mystery of the Moody Ghost (October 30, 2007)

=== 2008 ===
1. Roxy Hunter and the Secret of the Shaman (February 1, 2008)
2. The Fairly OddParents: Fairly OddBaby (February 18, 2008)
3. The Naked Brothers Band: Polar Bears (June 6, 2008)
4. Roxy Hunter and the Myth of the Mermaid (July 13, 2008)
5. Sozin's Comet: The Final Battle (July 19, 2008)
6. Gym Teacher: The Movie (September 12, 2008)
7. Roxy Hunter and the Horrific Halloween (October 31, 2008)
8. iCarly: iGo to Japan (November 8, 2008)
9. Merry Christmas, Drake & Josh (December 5, 2008)

=== 2009 ===
1. Spectacular! (February 16, 2009)
2. Mr. Troop Mom (June 19, 2009)

== 2010s ==
=== 2010 ===
1. School Gyrls (February 21, 2010)
2. Fred: The Movie (September 18, 2010)
3. The Boy Who Cried Werewolf (October 23, 2010)
4. A Very School Gyrls Holla-Day (December 4, 2010)

=== 2011 ===
1. Best Player (March 12, 2011)
2. iParty with Victorious (June 11, 2011)
3. A Fairly Odd Movie: Grow Up, Timmy Turner! (July 9, 2011)
4. Fred 2: Night of the Living Fred (October 22, 2011)

=== 2012 ===
1. Big Time Movie (March 10, 2012)
2. Winx Club: The Secret of the Lost Kingdom (March 11, 2012)
3. Rags (May 28, 2012)
4. Fred 3: Camp Fred (July 28, 2012)
5. A Fairly Odd Christmas (November 29, 2012)

=== 2013 ===
1. Winx Club 3D: Magical Adventure (May 20, 2013)
2. Nicky Deuce (May 27, 2013)
3. House of Anubis: Touchstone of Ra (U.S.: June 17, 2013/UK: June 14, 2013)
4. Swindle (August 24, 2013)
5. Jinxed (November 29, 2013)

=== 2014 ===
1. Terry the Tomboy (June 21, 2014)
2. A Fairly Odd Summer (August 2, 2014)
3. Santa Hunters (November 28, 2014)

=== 2015 ===
1. Splitting Adam (February 16, 2015)
2. Genie in a Bikini (May 25, 2015)
3. One Crazy Cruise (June 19, 2015)
4. The Massively Mixed-Up Middle School Mystery (August 1, 2015)
5. Liar, Liar, Vampire (October 12, 2015)

=== 2016 ===
1. Rufus (January 18, 2016)
2. Lost in the West (May 28–30, 2016) (miniseries)
3. Legends of the Hidden Temple (November 26, 2016)
4. Albert (December 9, 2016)

=== 2017 ===
1. Rufus 2 (January 16, 2017)
2. Escape from Mr. Lemoncello's Library (October 9, 2017)
3. Hey Arnold!: The Jungle Movie (November 24, 2017)
4. Tiny Christmas (December 2, 2017)

=== 2018 ===
1. Blurt! (February 19, 2018)

=== 2019 ===
1. Bixler High Private Eye (January 21, 2019)
2. Lucky (March 8, 2019)

== 2020s ==
=== 2021 ===
1. A Loud House Christmas (November 26, 2021)

=== 2022 ===
1. Monster High: The Movie (October 6, 2022)
2. Snow Day (December 16, 2022)

=== 2023 ===
1. A Really Haunted Loud House (September 28, 2023)
2. Monster High 2 (October 5, 2023)
3. Baby Shark's Big Movie (December 8, 2023)

=== 2024 ===
1. The Thundermans Return (March 7, 2024)
2. No Time to Spy: A Loud House Movie (June 21, 2024)

=== 2025 ===
1. Henry Danger: The Movie (January 17, 2025)
2. Dora and the Search for Sol Dorado (July 2, 2025)
3. A Loud House Christmas Movie: Naughty or Nice (November 21, 2025)
4. My Weird School (December 30, 2025)

=== 2026 ===
1. Clash of the Thundermans (September 3, 2026)

== See also ==
- List of Nickelodeon Movies productions
- List of programs broadcast by Nickelodeon
- List of programs broadcast by Nick at Nite
- List of programs broadcast by the Nick Jr. Channel
- List of programs broadcast by Nicktoons
- List of programs broadcast by TeenNick
