= Pacific Bay Entertainment =

American film studio

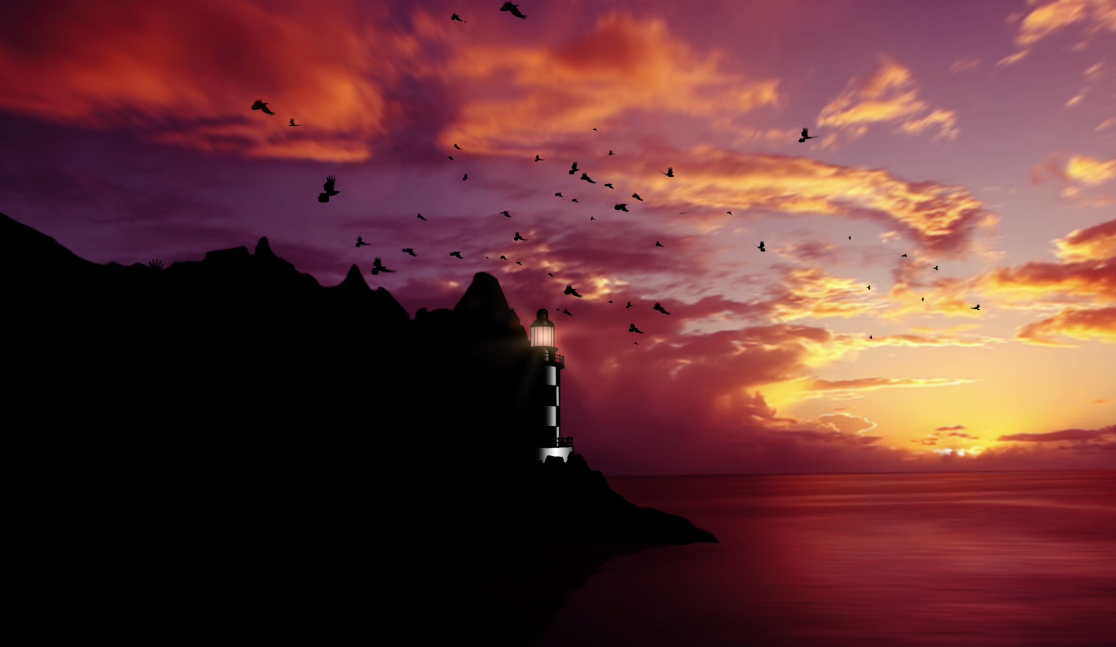
- Pacific Bay Entertainment Lighthouse
- Type: Private
- Industry: Film
- Founded: 1997
- Founders: Scott McAboy; Amy Sydorick
- Headquarters: Santa Monica, California, United States
- Services: Film production

Pacific Bay Entertainment is an American film and television production company based in Santa Monica, California and launched in 1997 by Scott McAboy and Amy Sydorick. Their slate of film and television projects Include: Jinxed, Big Time Movie, The Boy Who Cried Werewolf, Swindle, Rags, Saved, Son of the Beach, A Fairly Odd Summer, Santa Hunters, Splitting Adam, Legends of the Hidden Temple, Rufus, Escape from Mr. Lemoncello's Library and Malibu Rescue.

Scott McAboy won Best Direction for the Family Program category and Best Youth or Children's Program for Splitting Adam at the Leo Awards June 4, 2016. Amy Sydorick also won a Leo Award in 2015 for Best Family or Youth Program for Santa Hunters. In 2018, McAboy won a Leo Award for Best Direction and Sydorick won for Best Program for Escape from Mr. Lemoncello's Library. Most recently, Malibu Rescue's episode 103 (Sand & Deliver) was nominated for a BAFTA award for Best Family Program.

For the last two decades, Pacific Bay Entertainment has worked with several studios including Universal Pictures, Paramount Pictures, 20th Century Fox, Imagine Entertainment, Warner Bros. and Netflix. Currently, Pacific Bay is producing the Netflix action films and series Malibu Rescue.

Pacific Bay Entertainment has locations in Los Angeles and Vancouver.

== Films ==
- Inferno (1998)
- The Apartment Complex (1999)
- The Burbs (2002)
- Revenge (2007)
- Gym Teacher: The Movie (2008)
- Merry Christmas, Drake & Josh (2008)
- Spectacular! (2009)
- The Boy Who Cried Werewolf (2010)
- Best Player (2011)
- A Fairly Odd Movie: Grow Up, Timmy Turner! (2011)
- Big Time Movie (2012)
- Rags (2012)
- A Fairly Odd Christmas (2012)
- Swindle (2013)
- Jinxed (2013)
- A Fairly Odd Summer (2014)
- Santa Hunters (2014)
- Splitting Adam (2015)
- One Crazy Cruise (2015)
- Liar, Liar, Vampire (2015)
- Rufus (2016)
- Legends of the Hidden Temple (2016)
- Rufus 2 (2017)
- Escape from Mr. Lemoncello's Library (2017)
- Blurt! (2018)
- Malibu Rescue: The Movie (2019)
- Malibu Rescue: The Next Wave (2021)

== Television ==
- Team Knight Rider (1997–98)
- Son of the Beach (2000–03)
- Gigantic (2010–11)
- Malibu Rescue (2019-21)
