= Jack Griffo =

American actor and producer (born 1996)

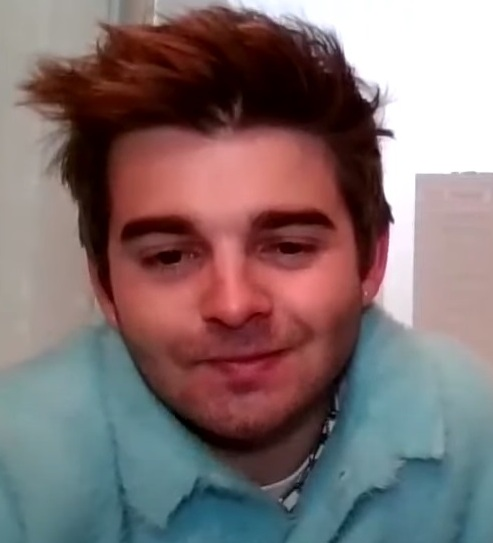
- Griffo in 2024
- Born: Jack Davis Griffo; December 11, 1996 (age 29); Orlando, Florida, U.S.
- Occupation: Actor
- Years active: 2011–present

Jack Davis Griffo (born December 11, 1996) is an American actor. He starred as Max Thunderman on the Nickelodeon series The Thundermans (2013–2018). Griffo reprised his role in its spinoff. Griffo also had starring roles in the network's original movies The Thundermans Return, Jinxed, and Splitting Adam, and the Netflix original series Alexa & Katie.

== Early life ==
Griffo was born Jack Davis Griffo on December 11, 1996, in Orlando, Florida to Kevin and Terry (née Palatini) Griffo.

== Career ==
=== Acting ===
Griffo first made appearances as an extra in 2011, on the television series Kickin' It and Bucket & Skinner's Epic Adventures. He followed this up with several guest appearances on television series such as See Dad Run and Jessie.

From 2013 to 2018, Griffo starred in the Nickelodeon series The Thundermans, where he played Max Thunderman, the twin brother who strived to become a supervillain (his twin sister Phoebe is played by Kira Kosarin). In the same year, Griffo starred alongside Ciara Bravo in the Nickelodeon original film Jinxed.

Griffo starred alongside Isabela Moner, Tony Cavalero, and Jace Norman in the Nickelodeon original movie Splitting Adam, which aired in February 2015. He played the role of Billy, the boyfriend of Fin Shepard (Ian Ziering)'s daughter Claudia Shepard (Ryan Newman), in the Syfy original movie Sharknado 3: Oh Hell No!, which premiered on July 22, 2015. In 2016, Griffo guest-starred in the season 7 finale of NCIS: Los Angeles as a military cadet named McKenna.

In 2017, Griffo played the role of Sebastian in the inspirational family drama film Apple of My Eye (originally titled And Then There Was Light). That same year, he was cast as Noah in the indie drama film Those Left Behind. In August 2017 Griffo was added to the cast of the Netflix original series Alexa & Katie, playing the recurring role of Dylan. He guest starred in School of Rock, Knight Squad, and SEAL Team. In 2020, Griffo starred as Sean Davis in the action film The 2nd alongside Ryan Phillippe. In 2020, he had a minor role in the Lifetime original movie The Christmas High Note.

=== Music ===
Griffo has a YouTube channel where he posts music covers. As of November 2019, the channel has over 178,000 subscribers and over 8.60 million views. Griffo released a single, "Hold Me", with his friend Kelsey, on October 17, 2011. The music video for "Hold Me" was released on October 29, 2011, and received over 4 million views. He released his solo debut single, "Slingshot", on November 13, 2013, which features Douglas James. The music video for "Slingshot" was released on Griffo's YouTube channel on January 14, 2014, and has received over 1.8 million views.

== Filmography ==
Film roles
Year	Title	Role	Notes
2011	Sound of My Voice	Young Peter	
2012	American Hero	Big Brother	
2017	Apple of My Eye	Sebastian	Originally titled And Then There Was Light
2017	Those Left Behind	Noah	
2020	The 2nd	Sean Davis	
2020	Butter	Parker	Also known as Butter's Final Meal
2022	Batman and Superman: Battle of the Super Sons	Damian Wayne / Robin	Voice role
2023	Sid Is Dead	Eric Worsham	
2024	The Thundermans Return	Max Thunderman	Also executive producer
2026	Clash of the Thundermans	Max Thunderman	Also executive producer
2026	Grizzly Night	Raymond Noseck	
2026	Batman: Knightfall	Tim Drake / Robin	Voice role
2026	Double Trouble	Juniper	Completed

Television roles
Year	Title	Role	Notes
2011	Kickin' It	Benny	Episode: "All the Wrong Moves"
2011	Bucket and Skinner's Epic Adventures	Surf Team Member	Episode: "Epic Musical"
2013	Marvin Marvin	Ellis	Episode: "Scary Movie"
2013	Jessie	Brett Summers	Episode: "Somebunny's in Trouble"
2013	See Dad Run	Xander McGinley	3 episodes
2013	Jinxed	Brett	Television film (Nickelodeon)
2013–2018	The Thundermans	Max Thunderman	Main role
2014	AwesomenessTV	Himself	Episode: "Teen Challenge"
2014	The Haunted Hathaways	Max Thunderman	Crossover episode: "The Haunted Thundermans"
2015	Nicky, Ricky, Dicky & Dawn	Himself	Episode: "Go Hollywood"
2015	Splitting Adam	Vance Hansum	Television film (Nickelodeon)
2015	Sharknado 3: Oh Hell No!	Billy	Television film (Syfy)
2016	NCIS: Los Angeles	McKenna	Episode: "Talion"
2016	Henry Danger	Max Thunderman	Crossover episode: "Danger & Thunder"
2016–2017	Paradise Run	Himself	Contestant, 7 episodes
2017	The Dude Perfect Show	Himself	Episode: "Velcro Dodgeball, Trust"
2018–2019	Alexa & Katie	Dylan	Recurring role (season 1); main role (season 2); guest (season 3)
2018	Lip Sync Battle Shorties	Himself	Episode: "Catwalk/Jungle/Girls Night Out"
2018, 2021	The Loud House	Blake Bradley	Voice role; episodes: "Fandom Pains", "Fright Bite"
2018	School of Rock	Slade	Episodes: "I Love Rock and Roll, Parts I & II"
2018	Best.Worst.Weekend.Ever.	Jumping Jack Lightning	2 episodes
2018	Knight Squad	Sir Swayze	Episode: "Working on the Knight Moves"
2019	SpongeBob SquarePants	Contestant	Episode: "SpongeBob's Big Birthday Blowout"
2020	SEAL Team	PV2 Elliot Mounds	Episodes: "Drawdown", "Edge of Nowhere"
2020	The Christmas High Note	Todd	Television film
2022	The Really Loud House	Ro-Bro	Episode: "Ro-Bro"
2023	That Girl Lay Lay	Beastie Pie	Episode: "Beastie Pie"
2023	Erin & Aaron	Scotty	Episode: "Should I Stay or Should I Go"
2025–present	The Thundermans: Undercover	Max Thunderman	Main role; also executive producer
2026	Stranger Things: Tales from '85	Jeff Nelson	Voice role; 2 episodes

== Awards and nominations ==
Year	Award	Category	Work	Result	Refs
2014	Kids' Choice Award	Favorite TV Actor	The Thundermans	Nominated	
2015	Kids' Choice Award	Favorite TV Actor	The Thundermans	Nominated	
2016	Kids' Choice Award	Favorite TV Actor – Kids Show	The Thundermans	Nominated	
2017	Kids' Choice Award	Favorite TV Actor	The Thundermans	Nominated	
2018	Kids' Choice Award	Favorite TV Actor	The Thundermans	Nominated	
2025	Kids' Choice Award	Favorite Male TV Star (Kids)	The Thundermans: Undercover	Won	
2026	Kids' Choice Award	Favorite Male TV Star (Kids)	The Thundermans: Undercover	Won	
