= Casey Simpson =

American actor (born 2004)

- Born: Casey West Simpson; April 6, 2004 (age 22); Los Angeles, California, U.S.
- Occupation: Actor
- Years active: 2007–present
- Notable work: Nicky, Ricky, Dicky & Dawn; Escape from Mr. Lemoncello's Library

Casey West Simpson (born April 6, 2004) is an American actor, social media personality, and video essayist. He is best known for his roles as Ricky Harper on the Nickelodeon sitcom Nicky, Ricky, Dicky & Dawn, and Kyle Keeley in Escape From Mr. Lemoncello's Library. He also has a prominent presence on TikTok with over 10.3 million followers and has a YouTube channel with 800K+ subscribers.

== Early life ==
Simpson was born in Los Angeles in 2004 and started acting at 3 years old.

== Career ==
His first role was on the sketch TV show Frank TV. In 2013, Simpson joined the cast of Despicable Me 2.

He rose to prominence for his role as Ricky Harper in Nicky, Ricky, Dicky & Dawn and as Kyle Keeley in Escape From Mr. Lemoncello's Library along with getting cast in guest starring roles on shows The Thundermans, The Goldbergs, How I Met Your Mother, Quantum Leap, and Law & Order. From 2021 to 2024, Simpson hosted and produced the trivia show KC! Pop Quiz on Kartoon Channel.

In 2016 and 2017, Simpson was nominated for "Favorite TV Actor" at the Kids Choice Awards.

In 2021, Simpson was a performing poet with Get Lit.

== Personal life ==
Simpson was part of a popular YouTube creator group called Squad 7 alongside Cody Veith, Ethan Wacker, Isaak Presley, and Michael Campion. He is a citizen of both the United States and Sweden.

Simpson works with the charity The Thirst Project.

In high school he competed in Speech and Debate.

== Filmography ==
=== Film ===
Year	Title	Role	Notes
2013	Despicable Me 2	Voices	
2013	Bukowski	Pin the tail on the Donkey	
2019	Strange Events	Party Goer	
2019	WeRiseUP	Self	Documentary
2019	Strange Events 2	Party Goer	Segment: "'til Death"
2020	To the Beat!: Back 2 School	Dennis	
2020	Timecrafters: The Treasure of Pirate's Cove	Josh Dare	
2025	Lifeline	Andrew Thomas (Teen)	
2025	Shoot, Shovel, and Shut Up	Andy	
2026	Street Smart	Zora's Crush Griffin	
2026	Scorpion †	Mike	
2026	I Am Your Driver †	Danny	

=== Television ===
Year	Title	Role	Notes
2007	Frank TV	Three Year Old	Episode: "Frankincense and Myrrh"
2010	How I Met Your Mother	Young Barney	Episode: "Blitzgiving"
2011	Five	Buddy	Demi Moore's chapter
2013	Samsung Smart TV	Sammy Makowski	
2014	The Goldbergs	Dougie	Episode: "You're Under Foot"
2014	We Make That Lemonade	Richard "Ricky" Harper	Music Video
2014	The Thundermans	Harris Evilman	Episode: "Patch Me If You Can"
2014	React to That	Self	
2014	Review	Heath	Episode: "Stealing; Addiction; Prom"
2014–2018	Nicky, Ricky, Dicky & Dawn	Richard "Ricky" Harper	Main role
2015	Memoria	Young Boy	
2015	Nickelodeon's Ho Ho Holiday Special	Self	Television special
2016–2017	Paradise Run	Self	Contestant
2017	Nickelodeon's Sizzling Summer Camp Special	Self	Television special
2017	Nickelodeon's Not So Valentine's Special	Self	Television special
2017	Escape from Mr. Lemoncello's Library	Kyle Keeley	Based on a novel
2017	The After Party	Self	
2017	KTLA Morning News	Self	
2018	Catman: The Love Thief	Lloyd	Fan Favorite Film at Santa Monica Screen Film Festival
2018	The Talent Show	Self	Host
2018	Total Eclipse	Prince Charming	Episode: "The Princess Needs A Prince"
2019	Liza on Demand	Voices	
2019	Lovestruck	Harry Fletcher	Based on the French TV Show Quadras
2020	Just Add Magic: Mystery City	Cody Hamilton	Main role
2021	KC! Pop Quiz	Self	Host, also producer
2022	Let Sleeping Dogs Lie	Carter Cardonian	Also written, directed, and produced
2023	Quantum Leap	Cory Zampol	Episode: "The Friendly Skies"
2023	Law & Order	Aaron Cole	Episode: "Class Retreat"

== Awards and nominations ==
Year	Award	Category	Work	Result	Ref.
2016	Young Artist Award	Outstanding Young Ensemble Cast in a Television Series	Nicky, Ricky, Dicky & Dawn (shared with Aidan Gallagher, Lizzy Greene & Mace Coronel)	Nominated	
2016	Kids' Choice Award	Favorite Male TV Star	Nicky, Ricky, Dicky & Dawn	Nominated	
2017	Kids' Choice Award	Favorite Male TV Star	Nicky, Ricky, Dicky & Dawn	Nominated	
