= The 2nd (film) =

American action film

Le 2ème amendement(The 2nd)
- Film poster
- Directed by: Brian Skiba
- Written by: Eric Bromberg; Paul Taegel
- Produced by: Geoffrey James Clark; Ryan Phillippe; Kirk Shaw; James Shavick; Brian Skiba; Josh Tessier; Daniel Grodnik
- Starring: Ryan Phillippe; Casper Van Dien; Jack Griffo; Lexi Simonsen; William Katt; Richard Burgi; William McNamara; Samaire Armstrong; Jacob Grodnik; Randy Charach
- Cinematography: Adam Biddle
- Edited by: Scott Conrad
- Music by: Richard Patrick
- Production companies: The Wonderfilm Media Corporation; Turbo Panda Productions; Kalispel Films; Lucid Films; Daniel Grodnik Productions; Fury Film Franchise
- Distributed by: Momentum Pictures; Voltage Pictures
- Release date: September 1, 2020
- Running time: 93 minutes
- Country: United States
- Language: English
- Box office: $13,996

The 2nd is a 2020 American action film directed by Brian Skiba, written by Eric Bromberg and Paul Taegel, and starring Ryan Phillippe, Casper Van Dien, Jack Griffo, Lexi Simonsen, Randy Charach, William McNamara, Jacob Grodnik, Richard Burgi, Samaire Armstrong and William Katt. The film was released digitally and on demand on September 1, 2020.

== Premise ==
Delta Force Major Vic Davis is on his way to pick up his estranged son, Shawn, from his college campus when he finds himself in the middle of a high-stakes kidnapping. His son's friend Erin Walton, the daughter of Supreme Court Justice Walton, is the target—and this armed faction will stop at nothing to capture and use her as leverage for a pending landmark legal case.

== Cast ==
- Ryan Phillippe as Major Victor Marvin "Vic" Davis
- Casper Van Dien as CIA Operative Melvin "The Driver" Sampras
- Jack Griffo as Shawn Davis
- William Katt as Bob Jeffers
- Richard Burgi as CIA Director Michael Phillips
- William McNamara as Jalil
- Samaire Armstrong as Olivia Peters
- Jennifer Wenger as Jade
- Lexi Simonsen as Erin Walton
- Jacob Grodnik as Neal
- Randy Charach as Justice Kenneth Walton
- Gene Freeman as Babcock
- Nicole Reddinger as CIA Operative Paula Danson
- James Logan as Sproule
- Chris Jai Alex as USSS Agent John Guillory
- Christopher Troy as Krieg
- Esteban Cueto as Rodriguez
