= Chase Ellison =

American actor (born 1993)

- Born: September 22, 1993 (age 32); Reno, Nevada, US
- Occupation: Actor
- Years active: 2000–present
- Website: www.chaseellison.org

Chase Ellison (born September 22, 1993) is an American actor. He is best known for his roles in Mysterious Skin, Tooth Fairy, and The Boy Who Cried Werewolf.

== Life and career ==
Ellison was born in Reno, Nevada to Gary and Cindy Ellison and has two older siblings. He began his acting career at the age of six, working in commercials and modeling for several print campaigns. He segued into television, landing a guest star role on Family Law, then on Boomtown, Malcolm in the Middle, 7th Heaven, Providence, The Division. He played a supporting role in George Bamber's The Mostly Unfabulous Social Life of Ethan Green, which then led to a major supporting role in Gregg Araki's Mysterious Skin, a guest role in an episode of Six Feet Under, and a semi regular role as Noah Newman, the son of Nicholas Newman (Joshua Morrow) and Sharon Newman (Sharon Case) on soap opera The Young and the Restless in 2005.

His role in Mysterious Skin (2004) was as the 8-year-old version of the character played by Joseph Gordon-Levitt, one of the film's leads. In this film, he plays one of two boys who are groomed into a sexual relationship by a Little League baseball coach. However, the film was shot in such a way that the young actors were kept unaware of what they were reacting to.

Ellison has a supporting role in the 2010 film Tooth Fairy as the teenage son of Ashley Judd's character, the girlfriend of the titular protagonist (Dwayne Johnson).

In 2011, Ellison graduated from Mt. Carmel High School, where he was an active member of the drama club as well as theater productions. He attended Loyola Marymount University. where he obtained a degree in film; despite his initial plans to study physics or engineering.

In 2018, Ellison obtained an FAA license to operate large camera drones, and has been employed by 'Beverly Hills Aerials' since 2019. He is one of their aerial drone cinematographers, shooting aerial footage for commercials and sports events. Ellison got inspired to make aerial cinematography a career when helping out his mother's business by capturing aerial footage with his DJI drone.

== Filmography ==
=== Film ===
Year	Film	Role	Notes
2001	The Perfect Wife	Young Ruben Tyman	Television movie
2001	Scenes of the Crime	Blake Berg	
2002	Santa, Jr.	Christopher	Television movie
2004	Mysterious Skin	Young Neil McCormick	
2005	The Mostly Unfabulous Social Life of Ethan Green	Young Ethan Green	Television movie
2005	End of the Spear	Young Steve Saint	
2006	Wristcutters: A Love Story	Kid Kostya	
2007	Quake	Toby Fisher	Short film
2007	You've Got a Friend	Tommy	Television movie
2007	Towelhead	Zack Vuoso	
2008	The Year of Getting to Know Us	Young Christopher Rocket	
2008	Fireflies in the Garden	Christopher Lawrence	
2010	Summer Camp	Derek Matson	Television movie
2010	Tooth Fairy	Randy Harris	Supporting Role; Nominated—Young Artist Award for Best Performance in a Feature Film (Supporting Young Actor)
2010	The Boy Who Cried Werewolf	Hunter Sands- Lead role	Television movie
2010	Unstoppable	Boy on news reel	
2011	That's What I Am	Andy Nichol	

=== Television ===
Year	Television Series	Role	Episode/Notes
2000	Family Law	Ryan McClendon/Pierce	"Going Home"
2001	7th Heaven	Young Simon Camden	"V-Day"
2001	Providence	Jake	"The Invisible Man"
2001	Malcolm in the Middle	Little Boy	"Surgery"
2002	Boomtown	Willie Stevens	"All Hallow's Eve"
2002	Boomtown	Willie Stevens	"The David McNorris Show"
2003	Boomtown	Willie Stevens	"Storm Watch"
2003	The Division	Justin Brinkmeyer	"Rush to Judgment"
2005	Malcolm in the Middle	Young Francis Wilkerson	"No Motorcycles"
2005	Six Feet Under	Young George Sibley	"Hold My Hand"
2005	The Young and the Restless	Noah Newman	19 Episodes
2006	Rodney	Danny Dunston	"Sleepover"
2006	Deadwood	Richie	"Tell Your God to Ready for Blood"
2006	Deadwood	Richie	"I Am Not the Fine Man You Take Me For"
2006	Deadwood	Richie	"True Colors", Uncredited
2006	Saved	Ben	"Crossroads"
2010	The Boy Who Cried Werewolf	Hunter Sands	TV film
2011	How I Met Your Mother	Scott	"Symphony of Illumination"
2019	Runaways	GrubMates Guy	"The Great Escape"
