= Son of the Beach =

American sitcom television series

- Genre: Sitcom
- Created by: David Morgasen; Timothy Stack; James R. Stein
- Starring: Timothy Stack; Jaime Bergman; Leila Arcieri; Roland Kickinger; Kimberly Oja; Lisa Banes (2000–2001); Amy Weber (2002)
- Composer: James Verboort
- Country of origin: United States
- Original language: English
- No. of seasons: 3
- No. of episodes: 42

Production
- Executive producers: David Morgasen; Timothy Stack; James R. Stein; Howard Stern
- Producers: Tim Andrew; Scott McAboy; Gil Wadsworth
- Camera setup: Film; single-camera
- Running time: 21–22 minutes
- Production companies: The Howard Stern Production Company; Loch Lomond Entertainment; Pacific Bay Entertainment; Fox Television Studios

Original release
- Network: FX
- Release: March 14, 2000 – October 1, 2002

Son of the Beach is an American sitcom that aired from March 14, 2000, to October 1, 2002, on FX. The series is a spoof of Baywatch, with much of the comedy based on sexual double entendres, puns, innuendo and the like. The lead character, Notchibald "Notch" Johnson, is a parody of Baywatch's Mitch Buchannon: where Mitch Buchannon is handsome, Notch Johnson is portrayed as balding, middle-aged, and pot-bellied, but is nevertheless seen by all the other characters as highly fit and attractive. Radio talk show host Howard Stern was one of the executive producers.

== Synopsis ==
The show centered on the adventures of Shore Patrol Force 30 (SPF 30, a pun on the term Sun Protection Factor), led by the pasty, out-of-shape, clueless lifeguard Notch Johnson (Timothy Stack). The rest of his patrol consists of B.J. Cummings (the innocent blonde lifeguard), Jamaica St. Croix (the ghetto-raised, mix-raced lifeguard), Chip Rommel (the dumb, hunky, muscular male lifeguard who is a parody of Arnold Schwarzenegger) and Kimberlee Clark (the smart female lifeguard and straight man of the series). Many of the plots revolved around action genre clichés and movie parodies, and the show made liberal use of celebrity guest stars including Jason Alexander, Mark Hamill, Alan Thicke, Erik Estrada, Gary Coleman, John Salley, Joey Buttafuoco, Patty Hearst, Adam Carolla, Hank the Angry Drunken Dwarf, George Takei, Gilbert Gottfried, Walter Koenig, Pat Morita, Anson Williams, Christopher Darden, Maureen McCormick, Lee Majors, David Arquette, Neil Patrick Harris, Musetta Vander, Angelica Bridges, Ian Ziering, RuPaul, and Dweezil Zappa.

The title is a pun on the phrase "son of a bitch." Likewise, character names are rife with puns and innuendo. Porcelain Bidet, B.J. Cummings, Jamaica St. Croix ("you make a saint cry"), Anita Massengil, and Notch Johnson all refer to some sort of double entendre, while Chip Rommel's name refers to the "Desert Fox", further punctuating the fact that the character is German, his parents being "The Rommels of Paraguay" (South America was a refuge for hunted Nazis at the close of World War II). "Notch" and "B.J." are also parodies of the names of the Baywatch characters played by David Hasselhoff and Pamela Anderson – Mitch and C. J. Kimberlee Clark's name is a pun on the company Kimberly-Clark, manufacturer of paper products such as Kleenex and Kotex.

== Cast ==
=== Main cast ===
- Timothy Stack as Notchibald "Notch" Johnson – The world's best lifeguard and leader of the Malibu Adjacent SPF 30, who is the best at everything he tries in spite of being old, overweight, and often clueless. He is something of a legend in Malibu Adjacent as several locations are named for him such as the Notch Johnson Home for Orphans and Retards and the Notch Johnson Space Center.
- Jaime Bergman as B.J. Cummings – Lovely young woman who grew up poor in the rural South. Naïve about sex but endlessly cheerful and nice.
- Leila Arcieri as Jamaica St. Croix – Tough lifeguard from the inner-city, shaped when she was abandoned by her parents.
- Kim Oja as Kimberlee Clark – Sweet "girl next door" type assigned to SPF 30 as a spy to bring down Notch Johnson, but ended up a loyal team member who falls in love with him.
- Michael Berenson as Lt. Steve Andrews – the English bulldog who was friends with everyone's legs.
- Lou Rosenthal as Spank – the monkey who serves as sort of a mascot for SPF 30.
- Roland Kickinger as Chip Rommel – A German bodybuilder.
- Lisa Banes as Mayor Anita Massengil (2000–2001) – Unpleasant Mayor of Malibu Adjacent who wants Notch Johnson out of the SPF 30 because everyone likes him more than her and he is better than her at everything, and an absentee mother to her flamboyantly gay son Kody.
- Amy Weber as Porcelain Bidet (2002) – An unpleasant but extremely attractive dark-haired gold digger attached to the SPF 30 in Season 3.

=== Recurring characters ===
- Anthony Wayne Johnson dancer – In the Line of Booty (2002)
- Candace Kita as Asian female news reporter (4 episodes) (2001–2002)
- Robert Ryan as Professor Milosovic (13 episodes) (2000–2002) – A wheelchair-using genius scientist who enjoys smutty humor.
- Jason Hopkins as Kody Massengil (12 episodes) (2001) – Mayor Massengill's openly gay son, who has a huge crush on Chip Rommel.
- Lynne Marie Stewart as Ellen (11 episodes) (2000–2002) – The friendly beach lesbian and purveyor of fish tacos from her food truck, who seems able to turn any straight woman into her latest fling.
- Vincent Pastore as Vinnie Fellachio (3 episodes) (2000–2002) – Disgusting mobster who is Jamaica's biological father.

== Episodes ==
=== Series overview ===
Season	Episodes	Originally released	
Season	Episodes	First released	Last released
1	13	March 14, 2000	September 12, 2000
2	15	March 13, 2001	July 17, 2001
3	14	June 18, 2002	October 1, 2002

=== Season 1 (2000) ===
No. overall	No. in season	Title	Directed by	Written by	Original release date	Prod. code
1	1	"With Sex You Get Eggroll"	George Verschoor	David Morgasen & Timothy Stack & James R. Stein	March 14, 2000	101
The SPF 30 and their fearless leader Notch Johnson are introduced, as new team member (and spy for bitter anti-Notch Mayor Anita Massengill) Kimberlee Clark helps them stop a human-trafficking operation.
2	2	"Silence of the Clams"	Scott McAboy	David Morgasen & Timothy Stack & James R. Stein	March 21, 2000	104
Radioactive seafood puts Malibu Adjacent's spring break/battle of the bands plans in jeopardy.
3	3	"In the G-Hetto"	George Verschoor	David Morgasen & Timothy Stack & James R. Stein	March 28, 2000	105
Jamaica is blackmailed into running drugs but Notch takes her place. Also, the mayor guarantees Chip a win in a body building contest in exchange for sexual favors.
4	4	"Love, Native-American Style"	George Verschoor	David Morgasen & Timothy Stack & James R. Stein	April 4, 2000	106
Notch must stop his adopted Native American brother from selling the Kahonee land to a crooked businessman who wishes to build a casino. Also, Chip needs money to assist his family and moonlights as a male stripper.
5	5	"Two Thongs Don't Make a Right"	Scott McAboy	David Morgasen & Timothy Stack & James R. Stein	April 11, 2000	102
Mayor Massengill bans thong bikinis from Malibu Adjacent.
6	6	"Fanny and the Professor"	Scott McAboy	David Morgasen & Timothy Stack & James R. Stein	April 18, 2000	103
The mayor tries to replace Notch and his crew with robot lifeguards.
7	7	"Eat My Muffin"	George Verschoor	David Morgasen & Timothy Stack & James R. Stein	August 1, 2000	108
B.J. falls into the clutches of an evil cult leader/sex criminal known as "the Divine Rod" (Mark Hamill).
8	8	"Miso Honei"	Gloria Muzio	Paul A. Abeyta & Peter Kaikko	August 8, 2000	107
Notch has to regain his legendary surfing skills, and the memory of his late super-surfer father, to stop criminal Adolf Manson from taking over the beach.
9	9	"South of Her Border"	Scott McAboy	David Morgasen & Timothy Stack & James R. Stein	August 15, 2000	109
Notch and the girls travel to the country of Humidor to help a friend stop a military coup and wind up in prison. Back in Malibu Adjacent, Chip runs the Junior Lifeguard program with an iron fist.
10	10	"Day of the Jackass"	George Verschoor	Fred Fox Jr. & Jim Geoghan	August 22, 2000	110
Notch's old commanding officer Captain Tenille arrives in town with plans to assassinate a world leader who's signing a peace treaty in Malibu Adjacent.
11	11	"A Star Is Boned"	Scott McAboy	David Morgasen & Timothy Stack & James R. Stein	August 29, 2000	111
Notch is assigned to guard beautiful but insane movie star Regina Streep and has to guard against her either falling in love with him or causing his violent death.
12	12	"Attack of the Cocktopuss"	Scott McAboy	David Morgasen & Timothy Stack & James R. Stein	September 5, 2000	112
Notch and the girls try to save a Cocktopuss after learning the mayor wants to keep it in captivity for profit. Also, Chip joins a rock band.
13	13	"Mario Putzo's 'The Last Dong'"	George Vershoor	David Morgasen & Timothy Stack & James R. Stein	September 12, 2000	113
The death of local pizzeria owner Papa Gigio leads to a violent showdown with mobster Vinnie Fellachio (Vincent Pastore).

=== Season 2 (2001) ===
No. overall	No. in season	Title	Directed by	Written by	Original release date	Prod. code
14	1	"B.J. Blue Hawaii"	Tim Andrew	Jeremiah Bosgang	March 13, 2001	206
The SPF 30 heads to Hawaii to visit Notch's old friend Pat Morita but have to face off against his evil daughter Rucy Roo.
15	2	"From Russia, with Johnson"	Scott McAboy	Joe Port & Joe Wiseman	March 20, 2001	201
An insane Russian submarine commander parks his boat off the coastline and threatens to start World War III.
16	3	"Remember Her Titans"	Scott McAboy	David Morgasen & Timothy Stack & James R. Stein	March 27, 2001	203
Notch returns to the basketball court as "Magic" Johnson to save Jamaica's gambling-addict boyfriend McBeal Ali from evil gangster Jerry Curl.
17	4	"Rod Strikes Back"	Scott McAboy	Story by : Michael Loprete; Teleplay by : David Morgasen & Timothy Stack & James R. Stein	April 3, 2001	202
The Divine Rod is let out of prison and returns to Malibu Adjacent to get revenge on Notch.
18	5	"Queefer Madness"	Scott McAboy	David Morgasen & Timothy Stack & James R. Stein	April 10, 2001	205
David Arquette is Johnny Queefer, whose gang of motorcycle punks plans to take over the beach.
19	6	"Light My Firebush"	Tim Andrew	Joe Port & Joe Wiseman	April 17, 2001	204
B. J. gets a visit from her mother and both are kidnapped by her evil stepfather. Meanwhile, Notch hires his adopted Native American sister as a lifeguard.
20	7	"Chip's a Goy"	Scott McAboy	David Morgasen & Timothy Stack & James R. Stein	April 23, 2001	210
The SPF 30 crew travels to Israel, where Notch commiserates with old friend Nocchus Johnstein, Chip finds love and faces possible circumcision, and the group has to foil a terrorist plot.
21	8	"A Tale of Two Johnsons"	John Putch	Joe Port & Joe Wiseman	May 28, 2001	211
Jerry Springer's criminal organization wants to use a body double of Notch to unleash a biological weapon called "the Ebonic plague".
22	9	"It's a Nude, Nude, Nude, Nude World"	Tim Andrew	David Morgasen & Timothy Stack & James R. Stein	June 5, 2001	208
The Nude-lympics come to Malibu Adjacent but someone is murdering the women and Kimberlee has no idea that it's her new boyfriend doing the killing.
23	10	"It's Showtime at the Apollo 13!"	Scott McAboy	Joe Port & Joe Wiseman	June 12, 2001	213
Jamaica's space shuttle flight is threatened by a teenage hacker, so Notch goes undercover at a high school to save her.
24	11	"The Island of Dr. Merlot"	John Putch	David Morgasen & Timothy Stack & James R. Stein	June 19, 2001	214
B.J. invents "Life Breasts" while taking night classes at Kelsey Grammar School.On the way to the International Flotation Convention in Bermuda, she and Notch crash land on the island of an eccentric millionaire who hunts humans for sport.
25	12	"The Sexorcist"	Gene Laufenberg	Mark Amato	June 26, 2001	209
A demon inhabits BJ, and Notch has to face fears stemming from the childhood death of his dear friend Father Chuck.
26	13	"Grand Prix"	Scott McAboy	Joe Port & Joe Wiseman	July 3, 2001	212
Notch is the pit crew chief for his friend's 3/4 midget race and must take the wheel after the competition sabotages the car,critically injuring the friend.Meanwhile Ellen and her girlfriend settle their differences with foxy boxing.
27	14	"Area 69"	John Putch	Story by : Joe Port & Joe Wiseman; Teleplay by : David Morgasen & Timothy Stack & James R. Stein	July 10, 2001	215
Notch's old commanding officer Capt. Tenille returns as the crew tries to find a kidnapped BJ.
28	15	"Booger Nights"	Scott McAboy	David Morgasen & Timothy Stack & James R. Stein	July 17, 2001	207
Vinny Fellachio returns as a porn king who has imprisoned Chip's beautiful sister Eva.

=== Season 3 (2002) ===
No. overall	No. in season	Title	Directed by	Written by	Original release date	Prod. code
29	1	"Penetration Island"	Tim Andrew	David Morgasen, Timothy Stack & James R. Stein	June 18, 2002	301 302
Tex Finklestein creates a new reality show Penetration Island, starring SPF 30. Unfortunately,rebel leader Dirty Sanchez and his team want their homeland back, and the show's contestants must now try to survive.
30	2	"Saturday Night Queefer"	Scott McAboy	Story by : David Arquette; Teleplay by : David Morgasen, Timothy Stack & James R. Stein	June 25, 2002	306
Johnny Queefer returns and fights to win a disco dancing competition after dancing is banned in Malibu Adjacent for some reason.
31	3	"In the Line of Booty"	Scott McAboy	Kenneth Braun	July 2, 2002	303
Notch gets caught up in a war between rival gangster rappers while Porcelain pretends to like Professor Milosevic, thinking his "cache" is "cash".
32	4	"Three Days of the Condom"	Arthur Borman	Reid Harrison	July 9, 2002	304
B.J. is interning for Congressman Bukaki in Washington, DC. When the news reports the politician is having a scandalous affair with her, Notch, Kimberlee and Jamaica head to the Capitol to investigate. Back in Malibu Adjacent, meanwhile, Ellen is hosting a charity for homeless lesbians, "Lezaid Faire", with Chip providing security.
33	5	"Witness for the Prostitution"	Tim Andrew	Mira Handman & Allison Gallant	July 16, 2002	307
SPF 30 infiltrates a campus prostitution ring and Notch pretends to be Kimberlee's boyfriend to fool her mother.
34	6	"The Gay Team"	Scott McAboy	Sam O'Neal & Neal Boushell	July 23, 2002	309
Notch must save Chip from Heinous Anus and The Gaytrix while B.J. and Jamaica cause problems for Porcelain and her husband.
35	7	"You Only Come Once"	Jack Murray	Joe Port & Joe Wiseman	July 30, 2002	308
Notch and SPF 30 must stop Stinkfinger from changing the world's weather and Jamaica finds out her mom is Okra Lee Gifford.
36	8	"Hamm Stroker's Suck My Blood"	Tim Andrew	David Morgasen, Timothy Stack & James R. Stein	August 6, 2002	305
During the Lifeguard of the Year convention, lifeguards start disappearing. And reappearing as vampires.
37	9	"Godfather Knows Best"	Scott McAboy	David Dipietro & Paul Ciancarelli	August 13, 2002	311
Jamaica finds out that Vinnie Fellachio is her father while Mrs. Strawther tries to have B.J. thrown out of SPF 30 for having a baby out of "gridlock".
38	10	"Empty the Dragon"	Tim Andrew	Mark Amato	August 20, 2002	312
Notch Johnson wins a trip to Japan and has to face a giant chicken created by a professor's growth serum.
39	11	"The Long Hot Johnson"	Tim Andrew	Patrick Stack & Kal Zurnamer	August 27, 2002	310
Notch and his crew go to the Bayou to stop the evil Bull Cracker from running people out of an African-American neighborhood rich with uranium.
40	12	"Taco Lips Now: Part 1"	Jack Murray	David Morgasen, Timothy Stack & James R. Stein	September 17, 2002	313
Notch Johnson's life from his time in Vietnam comes back to haunt him when he's accused of war crimes. Also, Porcelain's husband "Snuggles" passes away.
41	13	"Jailhouse Notch: Part 2"	Scott McAboy	David Dipietro & Paul Ciancarelli	September 24, 2002	314
Notch begins his prison term, Chip faces deportation and Kimberlee starts dating Notch's brother, Harry.
42	14	"Bad News, Mr. Johnson"	Tim Andrew	Story by : David Dipietro & Paul Ciancarelli; Teleplay by : David Morgasen, Timothy Stack & James R. Stein	October 1, 2002	315
Notch searches for Colonel Kooze to prove his innocence and must also find a way to stop Kimberlee's wedding to Harry.

== Syndication ==
Reruns of the series began airing on the Viacom-owned Spike cable channel on November 7, 2010, eight years after its cancellation. It marks the first time the series has aired in the United States since.

== Home media ==
Son of the Beach: Volume 1 was released on April 29, 2003, containing the first 21 episodes of the series (through Season 2 episode "A Tale of Two Johnsons"). The DVD also contains writer/director/cast commentary on select episodes, introductions by Timothy Stack as Notch Johnson, Too Hot for TV montages, behind the scenes featurettes, outtakes, and TV spots.

Son of the Beach: Volume 2 was released on November 11, 2008, and contains the remaining 21 episodes from the series, as well as bonus material such as new menu introductions by Timothy Stack as Notch Johnson, new behind-the-scenes footage, commentaries by the creators of the series, sexy montage highlights, cast audition tapes and a Son of the Beach table read.
