= Scott McAboy =

American Filmmaker

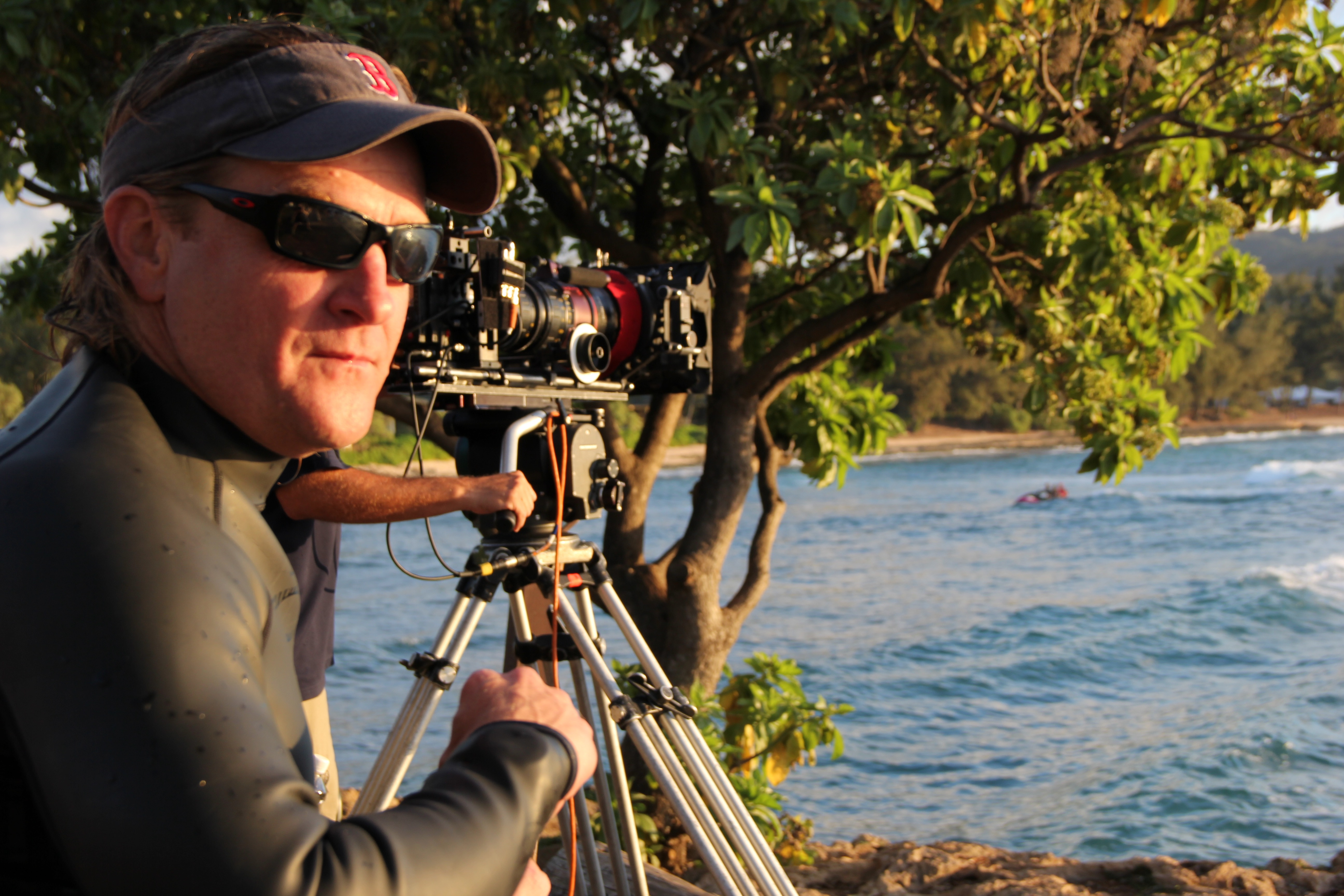
McAboy on location in Oahu, Hawaii

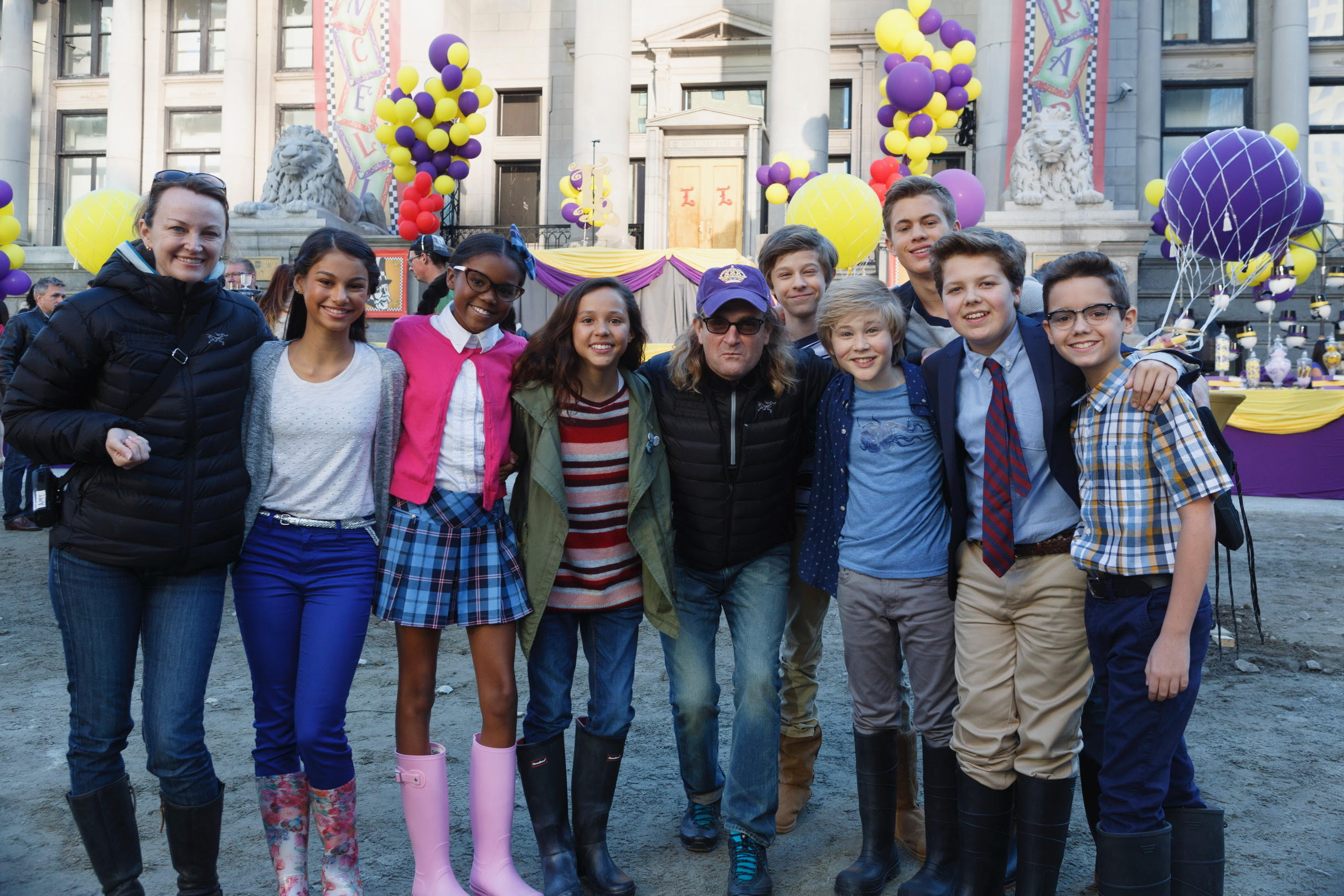
McAboy, Amy Sydorick and cast of Escape From Mr. Lemoncello's Library

Scott McAboy (born February 21, 1975, in Malibu, California) is an American director and producer best known for the family movies Splitting Adam, Jinxed, Big Time Movie, Escape from Mr. Lemoncello's Library, Swindle, Saved, Son of the Beach and The Fairly OddParents.

McAboy won the Leo Award for Best Direction in a Youth or Children's Program or Series and Best Youth or Children's Program or Series for Splitting Adam in June 2016. Santa Hunters also won a Leo Award in 2015 for Best Youth or Children's Program or Series. Most recently, McAboy won a Leo Award (2018) for Best Direction in a Youth or Children's Program or Series and Best Youth or Children's Program or Series for Escape from Mr. Lemoncello's Library (2017).

2021 projects include Malibu Rescue, an action feature for Netflix and the series that follows.

== Films ==
- Inferno (1998)
- The Apartment Complex (1999)
- The Burbs (2002)
- Revenge (2007)
- Gym Teacher: The Movie (2008)
- Merry Christmas, Drake & Josh (2008)
- Spectacular! (2009)
- The Boy Who Cried Werewolf (2010)
- Best Player (2011)
- A Fairly Odd Movie: Grow Up, Timmy Turner! (2011)
- Big Time Movie (2012)
- Rags (2012)
- A Fairly Odd Christmas (2012)
- Swindle (2013)
- Jinxed (2013)
- A Fairly Odd Summer (2014)
- Santa Hunters (2014)
- Splitting Adam (2015)
- One Crazy Cruise (2015)
- Liar, Liar, Vampire (2015)
- Rufus (2016)
- Legends of the Hidden Temple (2016)
- Rufus 2 (2017)
- Escape from Mr. Lemoncello's Library (2017)
- Inside Voice (2018)
- Malibu Rescue (2019)
- Malibu Rescue Series (2019 2020)
- Malibu Rescue: The Next Wave (2021)
