= The Apartment Complex =

- VHS cover
- Written by: Karl Schaefer
- Directed by: Tobe Hooper
- Starring: Chad Lowe; Fay Masterson; Obba Babatundé; Patrick Warburton; Amanda Plummer
- Music by: Mark Adler
- Country of origin: United States
- Original language: English

Production
- Producer: Scott McAboy Amy Sydorick
- Cinematography: Jacques Haitkin
- Running time: 109 minutes
- Production companies: Pacific Bay Entertainment; Sterling Pacific Films

Original release
- Release: October 31, 1999

The Apartment Complex is a 1999 American made-for-television mystery-thriller film directed by Tobe Hooper.

== Plot ==
The film involves a man named Stan who becomes the manager of an apartment complex with strange tenants, after the previous manager disappears under mysterious circumstances. Things go downhill after he discovers a corpse in the complex's pool and is accused of murder. More bizarre events occur until he finds his life (and his sanity) in danger, and the tenants just may be his only hope.

== Cast ==
- Chad Lowe as Stan Warden
- Fay Masterson as Alice
- Obba Babatundé as Chett
- Patrick Warburton as Morgan
- Amanda Plummer as Miss Chenille
- Ron Canada as Detective Culver
- Miguel Sandoval as Detective Duarte
- Jon Polito as Dr. Caligari
- R. Lee Ermey as Frank Stanton
- Charles Martin Smith as Gary Glumley
- Flex Alexander as Miles

== Critical reception ==
Variety gave the film a favorable review, writing, "not a scarefest by any stretch but creepy enough to sustain the interest of most viewers, this nod to The Twilight Zone cleverly winks its way out of some pretty silly situations. [...] ...director Tobe Hooper [...] earns points for constructing real tension and genuine thrills."
