= Merry Christmas, Drake & Josh =

2008 film by Michael Grossman

- DVD cover
- Genre: Christmas comedy Comedy-drama
- Created by: Dan Schneider
- Written by: Dan Schneider; Steven Molaro
- Directed by: Michael Grossman
- Starring: Drake Bell; Josh Peck; Miranda Cosgrove; Bailee Madison; David Pressman; Kimbo Slice; Henry Winkler; Jerry Trainor; Yvette Nicole Brown; Nancy Sullivan; Jonathan Goldstein
- Theme music composer: Backhouse Mike
- Composer: Backhouse Mike
- Country of origin: United States
- Original language: English

Production
- Producers: Scott McAboy; Amy Sydorick; Drake Bell; Josh Peck
- Cinematography: Marvin V. Rush
- Editors: Charles Bornstein; Marc Lamphear
- Running time: 94 minutes
- Production companies: Schneider's Bakery; Nickelodeon Productions Pacific Bay Entertainment

Original release
- Network: Nickelodeon
- Release: December 5, 2008

Related
- Drake & Josh; Drake & Josh Go Hollywood

Merry Christmas, Drake & Josh (also known as Drake & Josh: Best Christmas Ever) is a 2008 American Christmas comedy television film based on the Nickelodeon sitcom Drake & Josh. It is the sequel to Drake and Josh Go Hollywood (2006). Drake Bell, Josh Peck, Miranda Cosgrove, Nancy Sullivan, and Jonathan Goldstein reappear as their respective characters, with several recurring characters from the TV series also reappearing.

The film premiered on December 5, 2008 as a Nickelodeon Original Movie, a year after the show's original end in 2007. As such, it also serves as the narrative conclusion of Drake & Josh. It was the third most viewed TV movie on cable behind High School Musical 2 and Wizards of Waverly Place: The Movie, both owned by Disney Channel.

== Plot ==
Six weeks after the events of the series finale "Really Big Shrimp", with Christmas approaching soon, Walter and Audrey leave for a tropical vacation, leaving their kids, Drake, Josh, and Megan, alone at home. Drake plans to hold a party on the roof of Josh's workplace, the Premiere Theater. Josh's boss, Helen, approves on the condition that Drake dresses as Santa at the mall. While hiding from a woman looking to kiss him, Drake accidentally makes an unbreakable promise to a little girl named Mary Alice to give her family the best Christmas ever.

The party is crashed by uninvited guests whom Josh calls the cops on, but a mix-up results in Josh getting arrested. He bonds with his cellmate, Bludge, who pretends to beat Josh up to maintain his tough-guy image in front of the other convicts. Knowing he must fulfill his promise after Mary Alice tells him about her sick foster mom and busy foster dad, Drake attempts to break out Josh to help him, only to get caught and arrested. Acting as Drake and Josh's lawyer, Helen informs the judge of Drake's promise to Mary Alice, who decides they will not be sent to jail as long as they fulfill it. Afterwards, they meet their cruel and embittered parole officer, Perry Gilbert, who says he will take a vote from Mary Alice's foster family if they had the best Christmas ever; if any of them vote "no", Drake and Josh go back to jail.

The duo meets Mary Alice's foster family, which includes frequently feuding twins Lily and Violet, foreign boy Zigfee who speaks an unknown language, and know-it-all Trey, as well as Mary Alice's cynical, loner older biological brother Luke. Gilbert sabotages the duo's attempts to give Mary Alice's family the best Christmas ever, so Drake bribes Megan to help them with his friend Trevor's rare Smith Royal oboe passed down from his grandfather; Megan agrees but later reneges upon discovering Drake lied about Trevor having a Smith Royal oboe. Meanwhile, Walter and Audrey's vacation proves less than idyllic; their "deluxe bungalow" turns out to be at a small dilapidated hut that blows away in a tropical storm, and they have to prepare their own dinner.

After receiving several more tickets from Gilbert, the brothers learn from his mother that he always wanted a live pet chimpanzee for Christmas as a child, but when he finally got one, it attacked and urinated on him before fleeing, causing him to hate Christmas ever since. Drake and Josh then attempt to get the children into caroling, leading them to enter a Christmas parade Drake had shunned earlier. At the parade, Gilbert tricks Josh's co-worker Crazy Steve into loudly reminding them to keep their promise or else they'll be arrested; believing Drake and Josh were only being nice to avoid punishment, Mary Alice and her family leave, heartbroken.

Still determined to keep their promise, Drake and Josh borrow Steve's wood chipper ("Sally") to make it snow in front of Mary Alice's house by putting ice in the machine, but they inadvertently shoot large chunks across the neighborhood causing great damage. In trying to stop the machine, the brothers are knocked unconscious but are brought home by Gilbert, who was secretly gifted a nice chimpanzee by Josh and began to love Christmas again.

The brothers enter their living room the next morning, where Mary Alice's family surprises them, having learned the truth from Gilbert. Everyone votes "yes", and the charges against Drake and Josh are dropped. Bludge, dressed as Santa, comes down the chimney to deliver gifts to everyone, including a Smith Royal oboe for Megan, while Steve gets Sally to make snow using hard cheese. Walter and Audrey return home and everyone enjoys Christmas by playing in the "cheese snow".

== Cast ==
=== From the TV show ===
The show's vast majority of recurring characters returned for the special, all played by their original actors. Crazy Steve takes a more major role in this film, having a larger role than Audrey or Walter.

Character	Actor/Actress
Drake Parker	Drake Bell
Josh Nichols	Josh Peck
Megan Parker	Miranda Cosgrove
Crazy Steve	Jerry Trainor
Audrey Parker Nichols	Nancy Sullivan
Walter Nichols	Jonathan Goldstein
Mindy Crenshaw	Allison Scagliotti
Eric Blonnowitz	Scott Halberstadt
Craig Ramirez	Alec Medlock
Helen Dubois	Yvette Nicole Brown
Gavin Mitchell	Jake Farrow
Mrs. Hayfer	Julia Duffy

=== Movie only ===
These characters all have a larger role than most characters, second only to Drake, Josh, and Megan.

Character	Actor/Actress
Mary Alice Johansson	Bailee Madison
Luke Johansson	Devon Graye
Lily	Camille Goldstein
Violet	Cosette Goldstein
Trey	Daven Wilson
Zigfee	David Gore
Bludge	Kimbo Slice
Judge Newman	Henry Winkler
Officer Perry J. Gilbert	David Pressman

== Music ==
The opening theme for the movie entitled "Christmas Promise" was composed and performed by Drake & Josh series composer Backhouse Mike. Miranda Cosgrove did a cover of "Christmas Wrapping", and the song became the single of the movie, but no soundtrack was released. The cast featuring Drake Bell, Josh Peck, and the kids do a cover of "12 Days of Christmas" in the movie. Drake Bell made a music video for his cover of "Jingle Bells" which promoted the movie and can be seen on the DVD.

== Home media ==
The film was released on DVD on December 19, 2008.

== Nielsen ratings ==
The premiere of Merry Christmas, Drake & Josh broke the record of most viewers for the premiere of a Nickelodeon Movie with 8.10 million viewers, a title previously held by iGo to Japan.
