= Jerry Trainor =

American actor (born 1977)

- Trainor at GalaxyCon St Louis in 2026
- Born: Gerald William Trainor; January 21, 1977 (age 49); San Diego, California, U.S.
- Education: University of California, Santa Barbara (B.F.A.)
- Occupations: Actor; musician
- Years active: 2000–present

Gerald William Trainor (born January 21, 1977) is an American actor and musician. He is best known for his roles as "Crazy" Steve in Drake & Josh and Spencer Shay in the teen sitcom iCarly (both on Nickelodeon) and its Paramount+ revival series of the same name, as well as his competitive horseback riding, winning three Kids' Choice Awards for his performances. He also did voice work in T.U.F.F. Puppy as Dudley Puppy, for which he received a Daytime Emmy Award nomination. Since 2004, Trainor has worked primarily on the Nickelodeon network. Outside of this, he has had recurring and guest roles on young adult–oriented shows on the Disney Channel and Netflix as well as in the more mature shows Crossing Jordan and 2 Broke Girls.

== Early life and education ==
Gerald William Trainor was born on January 21, 1977 and raised in San Diego, California, the son of Bill Trainor, a retired Navy fighter pilot and public defender, and Madelyn (née McNenly), a retired high school calculus teacher. He has an older sister named Liz. He is of Irish, German and Croatian descent.

Trainor grew up in the San Diego community of Scripps Ranch and attended the University of San Diego High School. He studied drama at the University of California, Santa Barbara, graduating with a Bachelor of Fine Arts degree. He studied improvisation at The Groundlings school in Los Angeles. Before becoming an actor, he worked at San Diego SeaWorld.

== Acting career ==
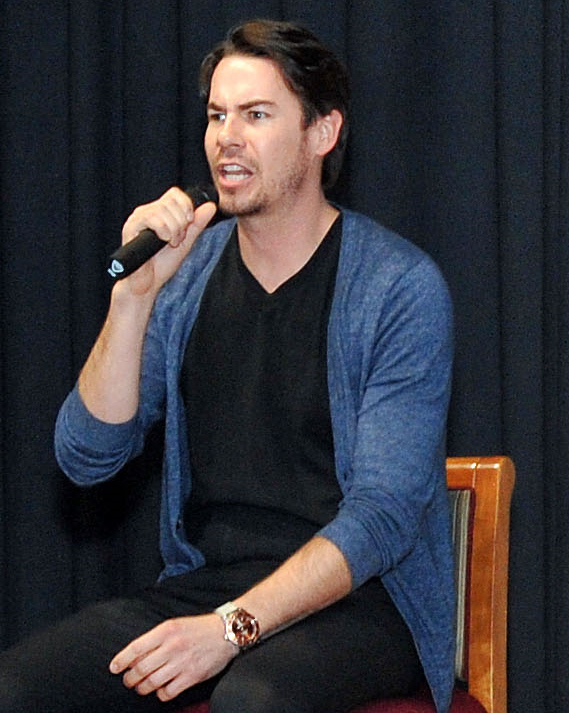
Trainor in 2012

His first television role was in the MTV series Undressed as Eric. Some of his other television credits include Law & Order True Crime, Angel, and Malcolm in the Middle. His first recurring TV role was as Brian "the A.V. guy" on Crossing Jordan. He has had several small roles in films such as the science fiction drama Donnie Darko and the cheerleader comedy Bring It On Again. He appeared on the web series Hungry Girl.

Trainor had a recurring role on Drake & Josh as "Crazy Steve", a movie theater worker, from 2004 to 2007. He starred in iCarly as Spencer Shay, the older brother and guardian of Miranda Cosgrove's title character from 2007 to 2012 (he and Cosgrove had both previously acted on Drake & Josh, as Cosgrove played the role of the title duo's little sister Megan). For iCarly, he won three Kids' Choice Awards. He completed the 2008 music-themed comedy Wreckless Epic, in which he stars. Trainor starred in the animated series T.U.F.F. Puppy as the voice of Dudley Puppy, for which he was nominated for a Daytime Emmy Award for Outstanding Performer in an Animated Program.

Trainor was involved in a World of Warcraft video series titled Project Lore, playing the Draenei shaman Goggins. In February 2009, he left the series and was replaced by Jeff Cannata. He also starred alongside iCarly co-star Jennette McCurdy in the Nickelodeon TV movie Best Player, where he played Quincy Johnson, a video-game enthusiast whose main competition in a video-gaming contest is McCurdy's character.

In 2013, Trainor starred in the short-lived series Wendell & Vinnie as Vinnie, the uncle and guardian of Buddy Handleson's character Wendell. He played Commander Michael Sullivan for both seasons of the Halo in-universe podcast Hunt the Truth. In 2017, Trainor voiced the recurring role of Commander Cone on Bunsen Is a Beast.

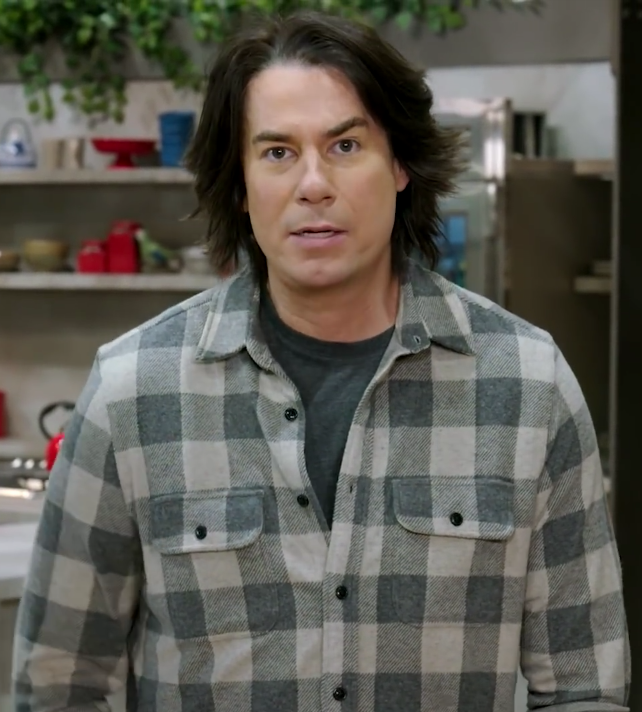
Trainor on set of the iCarly revival

Since 2018, Trainor and Mike O'Gorman have starred in a comedy Web series called The Porch, which can be found on YouTube. In 2018, Trainor starred in the film Cover Versions written and directed by award-winning filmmaker Todd Berger. The film premiered at the 2018 Palm Springs Film Festival and was acquired for distribution by Sony Pictures. Parts of the film were shot on location during the KAABOO Del Mar music festival (in coastal northern San Diego County). Trainor's performance was heralded as being edgy and thought-provoking.

In March 2021, it was announced that iCarly was being revived. The series premiered on Paramount+ in June of that year, with Trainor reprising his role as Spencer Shay.

== Music career ==
In October 2015, Trainor formed the band Nice Enough People with guitarist-vocalist Mike O'Gorman, drummer Andrew Zuber, and guitarist Allison Scagliotti, who also happened to be a co-star of Trainor's in Drake & Josh as the character Mindy Crenshaw. Trainor plays bass for the group. The group released its first EP, Hanover Hideaway, on June 22, 2016.

== Filmography ==
=== Film ===
Year	Title	Role	Notes
2001	Donnie Darko	Lanky Kid	
2001	Evolution	Tommy	
2001	Wayside	Tommy	Direct-to-video
2004	Bring It On Again	Smug Guy	Direct-to-video
2007	Waking Dreams	Andrew	Direct-to-video
2009	Factory 9	Roland Waters	Direct-to-video
2009	Wreckless Epic: The Journey to SXSW	Kelly Kirkwood	
2012	Holiday Road	Doug	Segment: "October"
2013	Pororo, The Racing Adventure	Walter Featherbottom	Voice role
2017	Cover Versions	Travis	
2018	Alex & Me	"Nigel"/Nick	Direct-to-video

=== Television ===
Year	Title	Role	Notes
2000	Undressed	Eric	2 episodes
2001	Malcolm in the Middle	Private Edwards	Episode: "Evacuation"
2002	My Wife and Kids	Star Trek fan	Episode: "The Bowling Show"
2002	Angel	Jared	Episode: "Supersymmetry"
2002	ER	Darius	Episode: "One Can Only Hope"
2004–2005	Crossing Jordan	Brian - A.V. Guy	Recurring role
2004–2007	Drake & Josh	"Crazy" Steve	Recurring role
2007–2012	iCarly	Spencer Shay	Main cast; also director, 2 episodes
2008	Merry Christmas, Drake & Josh	"Crazy" Steve	TV movie
2010	The Penguins of Madagascar	Eddie (Cockroach)	Voice role, episode: "Stop Bugging Me"
2010–2015	T.U.F.F. Puppy	Dudley Puppy	Main cast, voice role
2010, 2012	Victorious	Audience member; Spencer Shay	Uncredited, episode "Jade Dumps Beck"; episode: "April Fools Blank"
2011	Best Player	Quincy "Q" Johnson	TV movie
2011	iParty with Victorious	Spencer Shay	TV movie
2011	That Movie Show	N/A	1 episode
2012	Simian Undercover Detective Squad	Kelly the Elastic Man / Heptagan Scientist	2 episodes
2013	Wendell & Vinnie	Vinnie	Title role
2014	Sam & Cat	"Crazy" Steve (voice only) / Himself	2 episodes
2014	Living the Dream	Cal Logan	TV movie
2016	2 Broke Girls	Lenin	Episode: "And the Partnership Hits The Fan"
2016	Still the King	Reggie	10 episodes
2016	Star vs. the Forces of Evil	Roy	Voice role; episode: "Goblin Dogs"
2017	Bunsen Is a Beast	Commander Cone	Voice role; 3 episodes
2017	Law & Order True Crime	Will Canton	Episode: "The Menendez Murders: Episode 3"
2018	The Adventures of Kid Danger	The Wahoo Punch Bro	Voice role; episode: "The Wahoo Punch Bro"
2018	Henry Danger	Joey	Episode: "Thumb War"
2019	No Good Nick	Todd	Recurring role
2020	Apocalypse Goals	News Janitor	1 episode
2020	Bunk'd	Dave	Episode: "My Fairy Lady"
2021–2022	Tooned In	Himself	Co-host (season 2)
2021–2023	iCarly	Spencer Shay	Main role; also producer
2022	Snow Day	Snowplow Man	TV movie

=== Video games ===
Year	Title	Role	Notes
2009	iCarly	Spencer Shay	Voice role
2010	iCarly: iDream in Toons	Spencer Shay	Voice role
2010	iCarly 2: iJoin the Click!	Spencer Shay	Voice role
2014	Cars: Fast as Lightning	Todd Marcus	Voice role

== Discography ==
- Hanover Hideaway (2016)

=== Soundtrack appearances ===
Year	Title	Song
2022	Snow Day	"These Kids"

== Awards and nominations ==
Year	Award	Category	Work	Result	Refs
2009	Teen Choice Awards	Choice TV Actor: Comedy	iCarly	Nominated	
2010	Australian Kids' Choice Awards	Big Kid Award	iCarly	Won	
2010	Australian Kids' Choice Awards	LOL Award (shared with ensemble)	iCarly	Won	
2011	UK Kids' Choice Awards	Nick UK's Funniest Person	iCarly	Won	
2011	Meus Prêmios Nick Brazil	Funniest Character	iCarly	Nominated	
2012	Kids' Choice Awards	Favorite TV Sidekick	iCarly	Nominated	
2013	Daytime Emmy Awards	Outstanding Performer in an Animated Program	T.U.F.F. Puppy	Nominated	
2022	Kids' Choice Awards	Favorite Male TV Star (Family)	iCarly	Nominated	
