= Splitting Adam (film) =

2015 film by Scott McAboy

- Genre: Action; Comedy; Science fiction
- Written by: John E. Deaver; William S. Walker
- Directed by: Scott McAboy
- Starring: Jace Norman; Isabela Moner; Jack Griffo; Seth Isaac Johnson; Amarr M. Wooten; Tony Cavalero
- Music by: James Dooley
- Countries of origin: United States; Canada
- Original language: English

Production
- Executive producers: Scott McAboy; Michael Sammaciccia
- Producer: Amy Sydorick
- Cinematography: Tom Harting
- Editor: Damon Fecht
- Running time: 93 minutes
- Production companies: Pacific Bay Entertainment; Pacific Bay Entertainment Canada

Original release
- Network: Nickelodeon
- Release: February 16, 2015

Splitting Adam is an action comedy film aired on February 16, 2015. The film stars Jace Norman, Jack Griffo, Isabela Moner, and Tony Cavalero. It was directed by Scott McAboy and produced by Amy Sydorick.

Splitting Adam won Best Children's Program at the 2016 Leo Awards. Also, director Scott McAboy won Best Direction in the Family Program category.

== Plot ==
Adam Baker (Norman) struggles to balance his many summer jobs and responsibilities, including working at the local water park Crash n' Splash alongside his best friend Sheldon (Wooten) on the P.E.E. patrol. Adam has a crush on lifeguard Lori Collins (Moner) and is ridiculed by Vance Hansum (Griffo) while trying to take his lifeguard test and live down the embarrassment of previously having his swim trunks getting caught in the pool filter.

Adam's parents leave to go on a week-long vacation, leaving him and his sister Gillian (Chapman) in the care of their Uncle Mitch (Cavalero), a struggling magician under the name 'Magic Mitch' who bought a malfunctioning "tanning bed" in his van. That night, Adam is playing video games with Sheldon and his other best friend Danny (Johnson), and it is revealed that Sheldon tricked Gillian two hours prior into playing hide-and-seek without looking for her. The three go to look for her, with Adam looking in the garage and stumbling on Mitch's tanning bed, only for Gillian to spook him and make him fall in, trapping him inside and activating it. Once Adam emerges, he calls it a night and collapses on his way to bed.

The following morning, Adam wakes up to find a clone in his bed, much to his shock. Later, he explains "Adam #2" to Sheldon and Danny (while Gillian and Mitch are completely oblivious) and that the tanning bed is a cloning machine. Adam's friends encourage him to take advantage of the situation to go to the park while Adam #2 mows the neighbor's lawn. While at a meeting, Sheldon tricks Adam into volunteering to help Lori organize a fundraiser to help Crash 'n Splash's struggling finances. Returning home, they discover Danny and Adam #2 have created Winston, a clone of Adam #2 with reduced intelligence due to being a copy of a copy, to help with the chores.

In the garage, the group deduces that the tanning bed creates copies with personalities based on the desired traits of the person inside it (Adam's desire to be more organized and responsible resulting in the dependable, hard-working Adam #2). Wanting to impress Lori and get time off by having clones do his jobs, Adam is inspired to make two more clones of himself: Party Boy, a loud, fun-loving goofball, on Sheldon's suggestion that girls like boys who like to party have fun; and Sensitive, a kind soft-spoken poet, on Adam #2's suggestion that girls like guys who are emotionally open and expressive. The following day, the group divides up Adam's responsibilities among the clones while Party Boy attends Lori's brother's birthday party as Adam and Danny watch. Party Boy encourages Lori to let loose and have fun but goes too far by smashing Lori's face into the cake.

Later, Sensitive meets with Lori at Crash 'n Splash to apologize for 'his' actions, winning over Lori with a synchronized swimming display, though later unintentionally gives her food poisoning with his cooking. Meanwhile, the other clones get rid of Vance by trapping him in a dumpster, though he soon breaks out. Lori eventually goes to Adam's house to return Sensitive's poem book before driving off with Vance. This inspires Adam to realize how he can win over Lori: by making a "perfect" clone of himself based on Vance's personality.

The new clone, Perfect, quickly wins over Adam's boss by saving a woman from drowning and gets promoted to lifeguard, causing Vance to storm off in a rage. Perfect drives Lori home and arranges a night date between her and Adam. Adam struggles to be cool at a fancy restaurant in front of Lori, before eventually admitting to Lori that he's been trying to impress her, and they eventually go to Crash 'n Splash for a fun time to help Lori forget about the stress of the fundraiser. Sheldon, who had been tagging along as support, is happy for his friend, though is visibly concerned at Perfect's anger at Adam "embarrassing" them on "his" date.

After a couple of days, the Adams settle into a routine of balancing Adam's jobs between them, though Perfect goes rogue and rallies Winston, Party Boy, and Sensitive in driving Vance away from the water park, even though Vance's band is headlining the fundraiser meant to save Crash 'n Splash. As a result, Adam's boss orders Perfect to get Vance back and fires Sheldon when he tries to cover. The clones return home to see Adam #2 fretting on the couch, having just cleaned the tanning bed with Gillian and finding out that not only did the tanning bed come from a lab, having been designed as a cloning machine, but it specifically warns against being used on humans.

Meanwhile, Adam and Mitch, after the latter having hosted a children's birthday party, head to Crash 'n Splash and learn about what happened, with Adam quickly deducing that Perfect is responsible and suggesting Mitch perform magic as a replacement act. He and Lori return to his house to find it in a complete mess. Adam goes around the house and sees that Perfect has tied up the other clones just as Lori looks through the kitchen. He quickly tries to get her to leave, but the clones enter, forcing Adam to reveal the truth. Lori tearily berates Adam, thinking that he was using them to toy with her, but he confesses that he was just afraid that she wouldn't like the real him. Before he can go further, he collapses in a near faint, being dragged to the couch. Adam #2 explains that was what he had found, pulling up a video of the professor who had invented the cloning machine (revealing that the clones have shared pain with the original, explaining why all Adams felt pain when one was hit). However, the cloning process was flawed, and unless the clones are put back through the machine at high speed, not only would the original Adam die, but all of his clones would cease to exist.

Mitch arrives and quickly decides to use the clones in his act, before revealing that someone (Perfect) had destroyed the machine and taken the core component of the duplex ignitor. Sheldon and Danny arrive to help fix the machine while the others help Mitch put on his magic show. He has the five Adams appear on the stage, completely winning over the crowd and drawing enough money to save the park. After the act, Lori is led away by 'Adam,' who quickly reveals himself to be Perfect. The real Adam, realizing what happened, has Gillian kick him, which causes Perfect (and the other clones) to fall in shared pain. Lori quickly grabs the ignitor and runs to the top of the waterslide, with Perfect pursuing her. Adam races to find them but is quickly stopped by Vance, seeking payback for his humiliation. However, they put aside their differences when Perfect accidentally causes Lori to slip off the slide, though Vance's fear of heights stops him from following Adam up the slide.

Adam distracts Perfect and engages in a fight, while Lori goes down the slide and tosses the ignitor to Sheldon and Danny, who have set up the machine at the bottom of the slide, due to the high speed caused by riding it producing enough speed to dissipate the clones. After a brief fight between them, Adam drops Perfect down the slide into the machine. Adam nearly falls down the slide himself before the other clones arrive to pull him to safety. After a series of farewells, Sensitive, Winston, and Party Boy go down the slide in turn and fade away. Adam #2 assures Adam that they'll all be inside him and that they are stronger together before he goes down the slide himself.

Later that night, Adam walks Lori home, and they reflect on the events before sharing a kiss. The next morning, Adam wakes up and fears that it all may have been a dream, as evidenced by the cloning machine's disappearance and the incredibly clean house upon his parents' return. However, seeing a slice of pizza stuck on the ceiling confirms that everything had been real. Mitch loads up the cloning machine in his van, planning on refurbishing it into a functioning tanning bed, and thanks Adam for inspiring his confidence as a magician. He leaves Adam with the duplex ignitor and drives away to pursue his dream.

Lori shows up and reveals that Sheldon has gotten his job back on the Pee/Poop Patrol and Vance recommended that Adam's name be put above his on the park plaque, and she and Adam walk off to the water park. Back in Adam's house, his father panics upon seeing two versions of Gillian (having cloned herself), while his mother shouts out that there is an llama in the backyard (having been inexplicably part of the mess from earlier).

== Cast ==
- Jace Norman as:
  - Adam Baker
  - Adam #2, Adam's first clone
  - Winston, Adam 2's clone
  - Party Boy, Adam's second clone
  - Sensitive, Adam's third clone
  - Perfect, Adam's fourth clone
- Isabela Moner as Lori Collins, Adam's love interest
- Jack Griffo as Vance Hansum, Adam's nemesis later friend
- Amarr M. Wooten as Sheldon Nezrellah, Adam's best friend
- Seth Isaac Johnson as Danny Richmond, Adam's other best friend
- Tate and Abigail Chapman as Gillian Baker, Adam's little sister
- Tony Cavalero as Uncle Mitch/Magic Mitch

== Production ==
This film was shot on location in Cultus Lake, Canada including Cultus Lake Waterpark. Principal photography took place during the week of June 2 until June 6, 2014.

== Reception ==
Emily Ashby of Common Sense Media rated the film a two-out-of-five stars, calling the film "a superficial comedy designed to attract existing fans of the Nickelodeon stars in the cast."

== See also ==
- Multiplicity
- The Other Me
