= Liar, Liar, Vampire =

2015 American comedy family film by Vince Marcello

- Written by: Adrian Vina
- Directed by: Vince Marcello
- Starring: Rahart Adams; Brec Bassinger; Tiera Skovbye
- Theme music composer: Patrick Kirst
- Countries of origin: United States; Canada
- Original language: English

Production
- Producers: Scott McAboy; Amy Sydorick
- Cinematography: Tom Harting
- Editor: Damon Fecht
- Running time: 69 minutes
- Production companies: Pacific Bay Entertainment; Nickelodeon Productions

Original release
- Network: Nickelodeon
- Release: October 12, 2015

Liar, Liar, Vampire is a 2015 comedy family film that was released on October 12, 2015 through Nickelodeon. The film was directed by Vince Marcello and produced by Amy Sydorick & Scott McAboy. It stars Rahart Adams as a young student who is mistaken for a vampire and decides to encourage the mistake in order to keep his newfound popularity.

== Plot ==
When he transfers to a new school from Australia, Davis is concerned about the same things that most teenagers are, such as fitting in and finding new friends. However, soon after he arrives, the most popular girl in school, Caitlyn, mistakenly identifies him as a vampire – something that turns Davis into an almost instant celebrity. Not wanting to lose out on his new popularity, Davis persuades his next-door neighbor Vi into helping him continue the charade. As time goes on, Davis forms a close friendship with Caitlyn and Vi, though this stirs jealousy from the football team that is led by Caitlyn's boyfriend Bon.

After prom, Vi overhears Caitlyn discussing with her friends and camera team about how they are planning to have Davis turn Caitlyn into a vampire and stream it live. Vi tried to warn Davis, but he refuses to believe her, accusing Vi of being jealous of his growing popularity.

On the night of the "Turning", Davis attempts to make it seem real by using ketchup, but the ruse gets exposed by Bon, and Davis gets outcast at school for being a liar. Wanting to help Davis, Caitlyn's cameraman Ashton gives him behind-the-scenes footage of her true colors, including how she was only using Davis' act to boost her own image.

During a Halloween festival, Davis and Ashton plan to expose Caitlyn, but not before Davis meets with Vi and apologizes to her for not listening, stating that she was the only one who saw him for who he is. The footage is exposed to the crowd during a video presentation, and everyone, including Bon, turns on Caitlyn. Remembering how he too got ostracized once his lie came to light, Davis defends Caitlyn, explaining that her behavior is only how she suppresses her own insecurities, especially since high school can be tough on everyone.

Afterwards, Davis approaches Vi, and the two share a kiss, while Caitlyn makes amends with her only real friend Bethany.

== Cast ==
- Rahart Adams as Davis Pell
- Brec Bassinger as Vi
- Tiera Skovbye as Caitlyn Crisp
- Larissa Albuquerque as Bethany
- Sarah Grey as Not Caitlyn
- Drew Tanner as Singer
- Pauline Egan as Beverly Pell
- Alex Zahara as Baron Von Awesome
- Samuel Patrick Chu as Ashton
- Olivia Ryan Stern as Rita
- Ty Wood as Bon
- Tina Georgieva as Australian Student
- Will Erichson as Rayzon
- Harrison MacDonald as Stuart
- Curtis Albright as Jelly

== Reception ==
Common Sense Media rated the film at three stars, writing that it was "silly and self-effacing, but it does well to illustrate the importance of being yourself and surrounding yourself with people who appreciate the real you."
