= Escape from Mr. Lemoncello's Library (film) =

2017 film by Scott McAboy

- Based on: Escape from Mr. Lemoncello's Library by Chris Grabenstein
- Screenplay by: Zach Hyatt; Alex J. Reid; Jonny Umansky
- Directed by: Scott McAboy
- Starring: Casey Simpson; Breanna Yde; Klarke Pipkin; A.J. Louis Rivera Jr.; Russell Roberts
- Composer: Paul E. Francis
- Countries of origin: United States; Canada
- Original language: English

Production
- Executive producers: Jim Head; Scott McAboy; Michael Sammaciccia
- Producer: Amy Sydorick
- Running time: 69 minutes
- Production companies: Pacific Bay Entertainment; Pacific Bay Entertainment Canada; Head First Productions; Nickelodeon Productions

Original release
- Network: Nickelodeon
- Release: October 9, 2017

Escape from Mr. Lemoncello's Library is a 2017 film by Nickelodeon that is based on the New York Times Best Selling Book by Chris Grabenstein's 2013 book of the same name. The film, was directed by Scott McAboy and produced by Amy Sydorick, starring Casey Simpson, Breanna Yde, Klarke Pipkin, A.J. Louis Rivera Jr., and Russell Roberts.

== Plot ==
Kyle Keeley is an imaginative young boy who loves to solve puzzles created by game designer Luigi Lemoncello. One day, Lemoncello unveils his newest creation: a high tech library in which he selects twelve young children to solve puzzles and riddles. Whoever gets out first will be the new spokesperson for Lemoncello. Kyle is selected for the challenge alongside his best friend Akimi, Sierra, Andrew Peckleman, Charles Chiltington, Haley Daley, Rose Vermette, Miguel Fernandez, Yasmeen Smith-Snyder, Kayla Carson, Sean Keegan, and Bridgette Wadge. Upon entering the library, Bridgette and Sean forfeit after learning how difficult the challenge is going to be. Shortly afterward, Kayla is disqualified after taking a library card against the rules.

Upon solving the first clue, Chiltington lies to Yasmeen, causing her to be eliminated. Afterwards, they are given four rooms designed based on book genres: horror, fantasy, classic, and children. A holographic librarian named Ms. Tobin appears and explains the rules of entering the room, including that one can only enter each room once.

Miguel eagerly offers to enter the horror room to get the clue, but is terrified and opts out before he can reach The Tell-Tale Heart. Chiltington gets Rose to opt out due to her own fear. Fed up with one another, the six remaining children divide into two teams: on one is Chiltington, Haley, and Andrew and on the other one is Kyle, Akimi, and Sierra.

While Kyle's team enters the classic room, Chiltington's team enters the children's section. Both respective teams manage to receive their clues, although Chiltington lies to everyone that he forgot the clue in the children's section. This causes Haley to attempt to get it back, but is disqualified by Ms. Tobin for trying to go back inside: a rule which she did not listen to.

It is revealed that Chiltington had secretly taken the golden key, which has power over the whole library. Kyle's team enters the fantasy section while Chiltington decides to cheat and gets Andrew to follow him into the section as well deciding to cheat and use them to get the clue. While using the key to collapse the beanstalk and cause the Wicked Witch of the East to manifest, Chiltington accidentally destroys the system releasing all the literary characters into the library to wreak havoc. Chiltington, regretting his actions, decides to help the others. After reaching the exit, the children are all declared winners for their bravery and creative solutions. Andrew Peckleman offers Chiltington his friendship and a ride home after having been previously told that Chiltington's parents could not be here due to work. Lemoncello offers Kyle a job as a librarian, which he agrees to. Lemoncello gives Kyle the golden key for safe keeping.

== Cast ==
- Casey Simpson as Kyle Keeley, an imaginative young boy
- Breanna Yde as Akimi Hughes, Kyle's adventurous best friend
- Klarke Pipkin as Sierra Russell, a bookworm
- A.J. Louis Rivera Jr. as Andrew Peckleman, a nerd
- Russell Roberts as Mr. Luigi Lemoncello, a famous game designer
- Ty Consiglio as Charles Chiltington, a sly bully whose parents are always busy
- Hayley Scherpenisse as Haley Daley, a popular girl
- Patti Allan as Mrs. Gail Tobin, a holographic librarian
- Katey Hoffman as Dr. Yanina Zinchenko, the assistant of Mr. Lemoncello
- Sean Campbell as Mr. Keeley, Kyle's father
- Tanya Champoux as Mrs. Keeley, Kyle's mother
- Graham Verchere as Curtis Keeley, Kyle's older brother
- Samuel Braun as Mike Keeley, Kyle's older brother
- Anantjot S. Aneja as Miguel Fernandez, a helpful competitor in Mr. Lemoncello's contest
- Hannah Cheramy as Rose Vermette, a competitor in Mr. Lemoncello's contest
- Ombu Ance as Kayla Carson, an over-eager competitor in Mr. Lemoncello's contest
- Jena Skodje as Yasmeen Smith-Snyder, a competitor in Mr. Lemoncello's contest
- Dylan Kingwell as Sean Keegan, a competitor in Mr. Lemoncello's contest who forfeits early
- Lily Killam as Bridgette Wadge, a competitor in Mr. Lemoncello's contest who forfeits early
- Simon Pidgeon and Devyn Dalton as Hansel and Gretel, characters from their self-titled book that reside in the fantasy section of the library
- Breanna Watkins as the Wicked Witch of the East, a villainous witch from The Wonderful Wizard of Oz who Chiltington uploads into the fantasy section of the library
- John DeSantis as Frankenstein's monster, a simulacrum from Frankenstein who resides in the horror section of the library
- Brin Alexander and Etienne Vallée as a werewolf from an unknown story who resides in the horror section of the library
- Alexander Mandra as Count Dracula, a vampire from Dracula who resides in the horror section of the library

=== Voices ===
- Dana Snyder as the Troll, a character from Three Billy Goats Gruff who resides in the fantasy section of the library
- Kari Wahlgren as Charlotte, a spider from Charlotte's Web who appears larger in the children's section of the library
- Ben Pronsky as the werewolf vocal effects (uncredited)

== Production ==
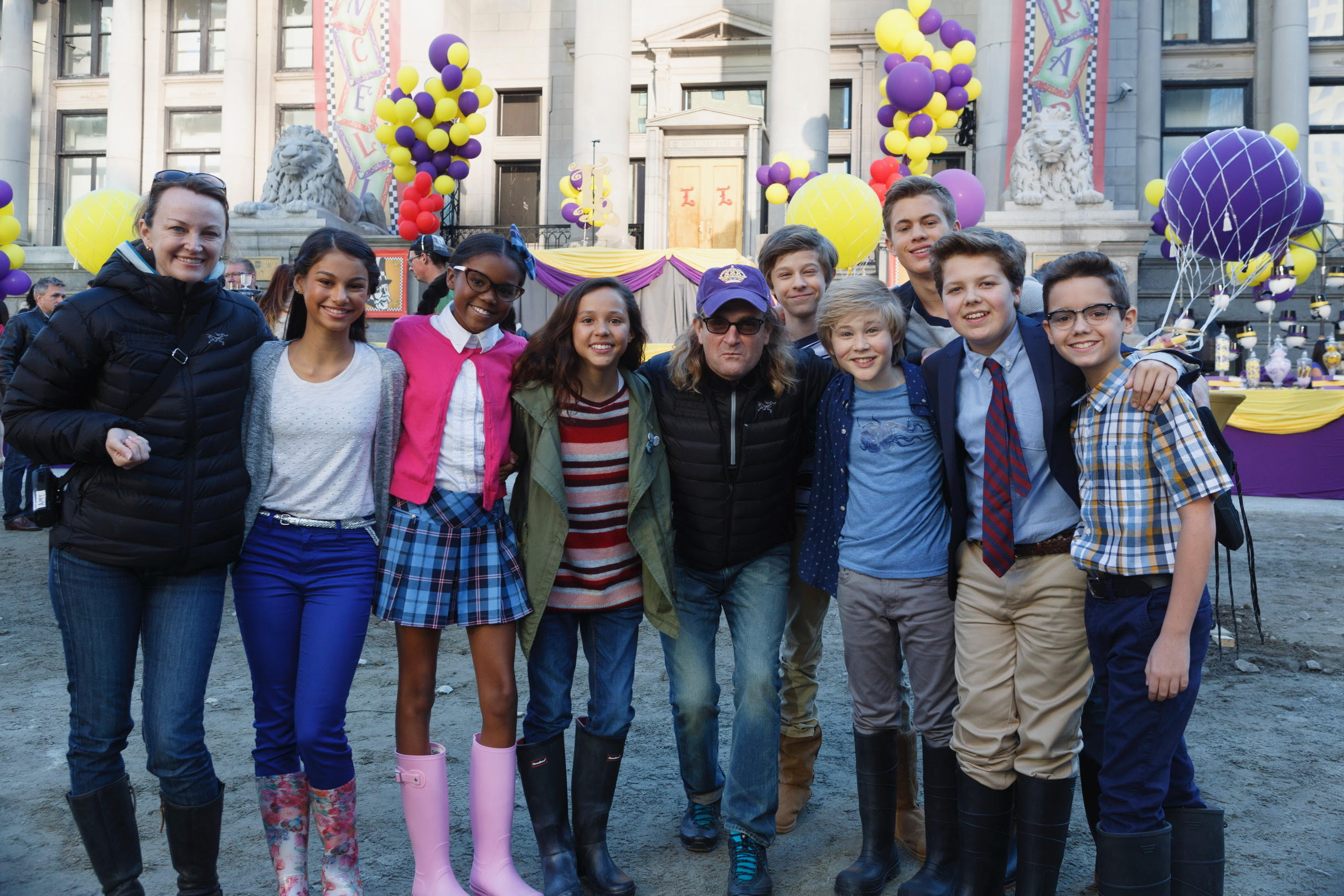
Director Scott McAboy with the cast

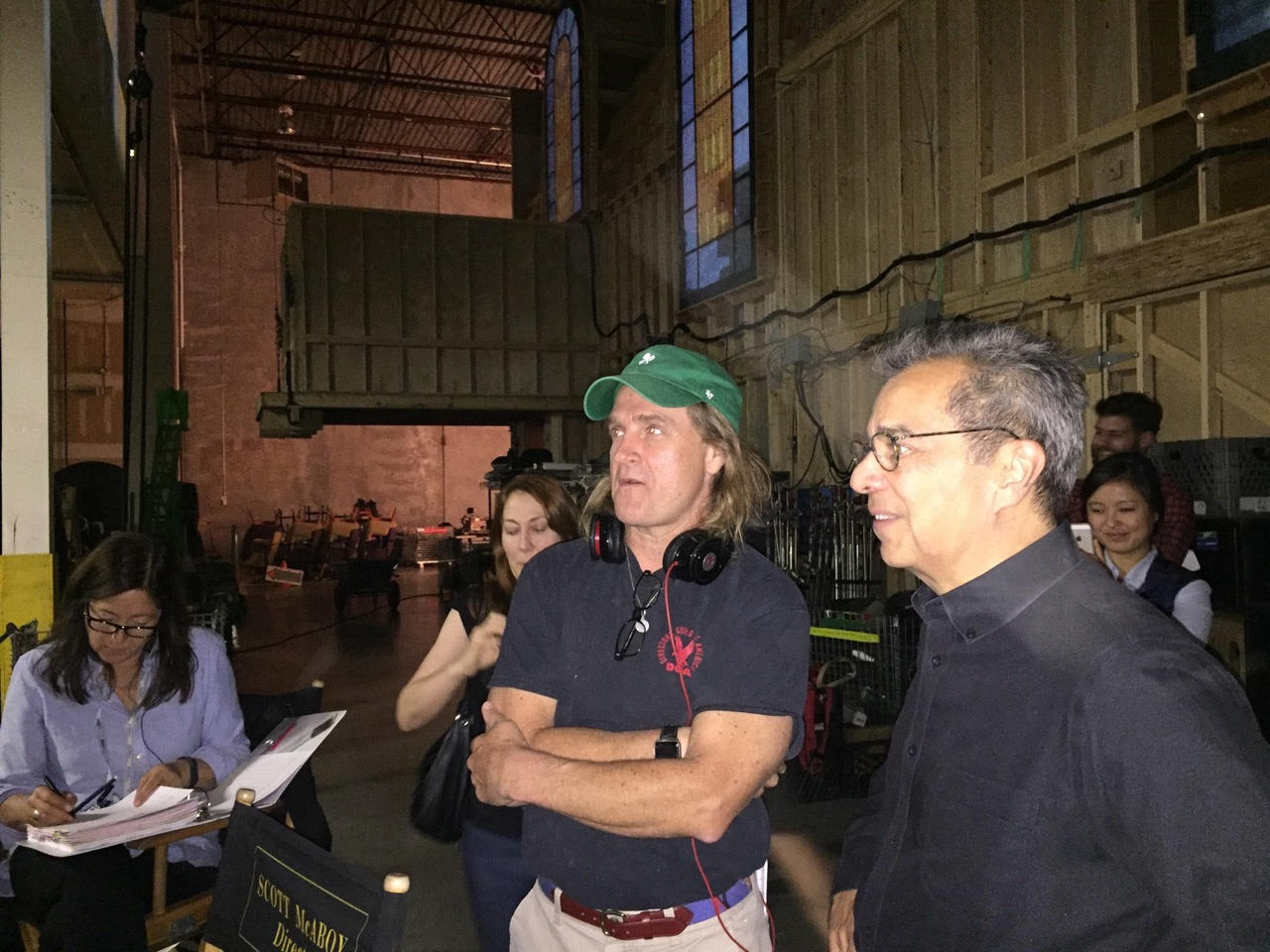
Director, McAboy and Writer, Grabenstein

Filming for this film was done in Vancouver, British Columbia, Canada.
