= Legends of the Hidden Temple (film) =

2016 English-language film

- Promotional poster
- Genre: Adventure
- Based on: Legends of the Hidden Temple by: Stephen Brown; David G. Stanley; Scott A. Stone
- Teleplay by: Zach Hyatt; Jonny Umansky; Alex Jenkins Reid
- Story by: Alex Jenkins Reid; Zach Hyatt; Jonny Umansky
- Directed by: Joe Menendez
- Starring: Isabela Moner; Colin Critchley; Jet Jurgensmeyer; Kirk Fogg
- Music by: Paul E. Francis
- Countries of origin: United States; Canada
- Original language: English

Production
- Executive producers: Scott McAboy; Jessica Rhoades; Michael Sammaciccia
- Producer: Amy Sydorick
- Cinematography: Tom Harting
- Editor: Damon Fecht
- Running time: 65 minutes
- Production company: Pacific Bay Entertainment

Original release
- Network: Nickelodeon
- Release: November 26, 2016

Legends of the Hidden Temple (also known as Legends of the Hidden Temple: The Movie) is a 2016 adventure television film inspired by the mid-1990s game show of the same name. The film follows three siblings who ditch a jungle tour and find themselves undergoing a real-life obstacle course with the help of Kirk Fogg and Olmec. It premiered on Nickelodeon on November 26, 2016.

== Plot ==
Three siblings, teenager Sadie and her kid brothers Noah and Dudley, are vacationing in Mexico with their parents, who allow them to visit the Hidden Temple theme park on their own where Kirk Fogg now works as a tour guide. Noah, being fascinated by the legends of the Hidden Temple, which he believes are real, wishes he could explore it on the inside, but Fogg reveals the Temple was closed to the public following an incident years earlier. Impressed by Noah's knowledge about the Temple, Fogg gives him a map he found inside. Much to Sadie's annoyance, Noah and Dudley sneak into the restricted area where the secret entrance is believed to be. Sadie tries to stop them, but accidentally steps on the trapdoor that sends them into the temple.

The kids are welcomed inside the temple by none other than Olmec, who was once a king. He recalls of a moment in his life, then tells them what he remembers. He planned to decree his good son, Prince Zuma, as a successor to the kingdom, when suddenly his evil son Thak and his army of Temple Guards appeared and attempted to kill Zuma and insediate Thak as king. So Olmec had no choice but to turn the entire civilization to stone. Noah believes that he, Sadie and Dudley are the only ones who can restore the kingdom back to its former glory. Olmec instructs them to find both half-pendants of life in the Room of the Ancient Warriors and the Treasure Room, but warns them of the dangers that might lurk around the temple. Once both half-pendants are found, they must be combined to unlock the Temple and then exit within three minutes, otherwise the three siblings will risk being trapped inside the Temple forever.

== Cast ==
- Isabela Moner as Sadie
- Colin Critchley as Noah
- Jet Jurgensmeyer as Dudley
- Kirk Fogg as himself
- Daniel Cudmore as Thak
- Michael Benyaer as King Olmec
- Ioan Sebastian Tirlui as Zuma
- Catia Ojeda as Mom
- David Michie as Dad
- Dee Bradley Baker as Olmec (voice)
- James Black as Tourist
- Jon Molerio as Sargento Primedo
- Oscar Torre as Crew Leader
- Greg Cromer as Chet
- Crystal as Mikey the Monkey
- Squire as Mikey Understudy

== Production ==
Jet Jurgensmeyer was cast as Dudley, the youngest of the three siblings, who has the ability to talk to all animals except snakes. Kirk Fogg, the original host of Legends of the Hidden Temple, the 1990s game show on which the film is based, returns as a fictionalized version of himself, working as a tour guide. Colin Critchley and Isabela Moner also appear in the film. Voice actor Dee Bradley Baker, who is also from the original game show, reprised his role as Olmec.

== Ratings ==
Legends of the Hidden Temple attracted a total of 1.60 million viewers.
