= A Fairly Odd Summer =

2014 Television film directed by Savage Steve Holland

- Genre: Comedy; Fantasy
- Based on: The Fairly OddParents by Butch Hartman
- Teleplay by: Butch Hartman; Savage Steve Holland
- Story by: Butch Hartman; Ray DeLaurentis; Will Schifrin; Kevin Sullivan
- Directed by: Savage Steve Holland
- Starring: Drake Bell; Daniella Monet; Tara Strong; Daran Norris; David Lewis; Mark Gibbon; Teryl Rothery; Scott Baio
- Theme music composer: Guy Moon
- Country of origin: United States
- Original language: English

Production
- Executive producers: Scott McAboy; Butch Hartman; Michael Sammaciccia
- Producer: Amy Sydorick
- Cinematography: Tom Harting
- Editor: Damon Fecht
- Running time: 66 minutes
- Production companies: Billionfold, Inc. Frederator Studios; Pacific Bay Entertainment; Nickelodeon Productions

Original release
- Network: Nickelodeon
- Release: August 2, 2014

Related
- A Fairly Odd Christmas

A Fairly Odd Summer (also known as A Fairly Odd Movie 3 or A Fairly Odd Paradise) is a 2014 American live-action/animated comedy television film. It is the sequel to A Fairly Odd Christmas and was released on August 2, 2014. It is the third and final installment in The Fairly OddParents live-action film series beginning with the first film A Fairly Odd Movie: Grow Up, Timmy Turner!, and continuing with its first sequel.

The film was released on DVD on October 28, 2014, and was released on Blu-ray on December 4, 2015.

== Plot ==
Following his previous adventure, Timmy Turner is assigned a summer job in Fairy World's Yuck Factory by head fairy Jorgen Von Strangle, who insists he learns to earn income as an adult. Timmy, despite being unable to enjoy his summer vacation, chooses to do so in order to impress Tootie, who now works for the Help Creatures Dimmsdale Research Center. One day after work, Timmy visits Tootie at the Center and discovers to his dismay that the head of the Center wants her to deliver a special cure for rare spotted dolphins to Hawaii.

The vial containing the cure is accidentally switched for Timmy's lip balm, which is packed away into a travel case by mistake while he takes the cure's vial. Upon returning home, Timmy is shocked to discover that his parents are also going to Hawaii, after Mr. Turner's pencil company chose it for the company's next vacation. Mr. Turner reveals he has been put in charge of providing the entertainment by performing a fire dance, only to learn from Timmy after reading the note his boss gave him that he will be fired if he fails to provide.

Meanwhile, two children from a rich family, Marty and Mitzi Mulligan, are excited about going to Hawaii, until they learn their parents will not be going, instead sending them off with a nanny, who turns out to be Vicky.

In Fairy World, Jorgen promotes Timmy to supervise the source of all fairy magic, Abracadabraium, while he is away in Hawaii competing in the Bronze Biceps contest. Timmy discovers that his father packed the check he had been given within his sandwich by mistake, while also discovering that his lip balm was taken by Tootie instead of the cure. Seeking to fix both mistakes, Timmy heads to Hawaii, taking the Abracadabraium with him in a bowling bag.

Meanwhile, Poof's counterpart, Foop, who had been spying on him, meets with the Anti-Fairy council over his failure to destroy Timmy's fairies and vows to find a new way to do so by going after the Abracadabraium and destroying it, despite the fact that no anti-fairy can touch it because of the good magic stored in it.

The council orders him to do so, stripping him of his bottle, the source of his magic, to ensure he completes his task in order to avoid a horrible punishment. Heading for Hawaii, Foop runs into Mr. Crocker at the airport, after he was sent there by his mother in the hopes of curing his obsession with fairies. Realizing that Foop plans to cause mischief for Timmy and destroy Fairy World, Crocker agrees to help him in acquiring the Abracadabraium.

After returning the check to his father and the cure to Tootie, Timmy tries to relax with her and his fairies on the beach. There, he and Tootie run into Marty and Mitzy, who had run away from Vicky after she had mistreated them and help them escape from her so that they can have some fun.

Crocker, who is given the money for the fire dance by Mr. Turner, and Foop, having taken on human form, distract the pair and steal the Abracadabraium from Timmy, putting Fairy World in danger and weakening Cosmo, Wanda and Poof. Realizing he has been duped, Timmy is spotted by Jorgen who becomes furious he lost the Abracadaraium. His anger changes his skin, causing him to win in the Bronze Biceps contest. Seeking to get the Abracadabrium back, the pair and the fairies recruit Marty and Mitzy to help and soon discover that Foop plans to drop it into a lava pool within a volcano.

The group discovers that Crocker, who was planning to help, became affected by it, turning good and refusing to do as Foop wants. Angered, Foop risks touching the substance to destroy it, leading to Timmy struggling with him to get it back and falling into the lava with it. Much to the surprise of the others, Timmy survives and becomes a fairy after absorbing some of the powers of the Abracadabraium. A defiant Foop swears revenge but is soon sent away by Poof, while Crocker soon returns to his normal self.

With Timmy now a fairy, Jorgen reassigns Cosmo, Wanda, and Poof to Marty and Mitzy, who he states deserve them, whilst allowing Timmy to visit them. Timmy uses his new powers to save his father's job by creating a fire dance for him with Crocker in it. While Marty and Mitzy take delight in having fairies, Tootie dances with Timmy, declaring that she will need time to get used his new form. The stage sets off fireworks and Poof sends off the audience with an "Aloha!".

In the epilogue, Foop gets sent down the drain, which he describes as the "unspeakable horror".

== Cast ==
=== Live cast ===
- Drake Bell as Timmy Turner
- Daniella Monet as Tootie
- David Lewis as Mr. Denzel Crocker
- Ella Anderson as Mitzy Mulligan
- Carter Hastings as Marty Mulligan
- Mark Gibbon as Jorgen Von Strangle
- Daran Norris as Mr. Turner
- Teryl Rothery as Mrs. Turner
- Devon Weigel as Vicky
- Scott Baio as Foop
- Ali Liebert as Mrs. Mulligan
- Vincent Tong as Dr. Flemmish
- Butch Hartman as Crazy Guy

=== Animated voice cast ===
- Daran Norris as Cosmo (voice)
- Susanne Blakeslee as Wanda (voice)
- Tara Strong as Timmy Turner, Poof (voice)
- Eric Bauza as Foop (voice)
- Veena Sood as Anti-Fairy Councilman (voice)

== Ratings ==
The film received 2.79 million viewers and a 0.5 on the 18-49 rating.
