= Santa Hunters =

2014 American Film

- Promotional poster
- Written by: Jamie Nash
- Directed by: Savage Steve Holland
- Starring: Benjamin Flores Jr. Breanna Yde; Mace Coronel; Laya Hayes; Donavon Stinson; April Telek; Kelly Perine
- Music by: Zack Ryan
- Countries of origin: Canada; United States
- Original language: English

Production
- Producers: Scott McAboy; Amy Sydorick
- Cinematography: Tom Harting
- Editor: Damon Fecht
- Running time: 65 minutes
- Production companies: Pacific Bay Entertainment; Indaba Media Capital

Original release
- Network: Nickelodeon
- Release: November 28, 2014

Santa Hunters is a 2014 made-for-television film created for Nickelodeon. It was directed by Savage Steve Holland, based on a script written by Jamie Nash and produced by Amy Sydorick. The film stars Benjamin Flores Jr., Breanna Yde, Laya DeLeon Hayes, and Mace Coronel as a group of children trying to find evidence to prove the existence of Santa Claus.

== Plot ==
All Alex wants to do is prove to the world that Santa exists. He has managed to convince his sister Elizabeth and their cousins Zoey and Richard to set up cameras throughout their house to capture footage of Santa. Their attempt is successful, but to their horror, they discover that Santa loses a bit of his magic every time he's seen. As Christmas begins to vanish before their eyes, it's up to the children to find and destroy the evidence of Santa. However, they must first contend with their Uncle Charlie's girlfriend Natasha, who is determined to sell the footage of Santa for her own selfish gains.

== Cast ==
- Benjamin Flores Jr. as Alex
- Breanna Yde as Zoey, Alex's cousin
- Mace Coronel as Richard, Alex's cousin
- Laya Hayes as Elizabeth, Alex's sister
- Donavon Stinson as Santa
- April Telek as Natasha
- Kelly Perine as Uncle Charlie
- Brenda M. Chrichlow as Mom
- Viv Leacock as Dad
- BJ Harrison as Grandma
- Alvin Sanders as Grandpa
- Serge Houde as Principal Welch
- Sewit Haile as Leader Girl
- Eric Fell as Cop
- Rachel Prosch as Tweener Girl
- Bill Kurtis as Santa Hunters V.O. Narrator (voice)

== Production ==
The principal photography of the movie began on February 18 and ended on March 5, 2014. It was filmed in various cities of British Columbia, Canada.

== Reception ==
Common Sense Media gave the film two stars, as they felt that it was "a fairly mundane addition to a holiday movie repertoire packed with classics and traditional favorites." Media Life Magazine panned Santa Hunters, criticizing it for its focus on commercialism, stating that "The show’s writer, Jamie Nash, and director, Savage Steve Holland, must never have read or seen “How the Grinch Stole Christmas,” because then they would know that Christmas isn’t just about getting presents and that it means a little bit more."

In contrast, the New York Times gave a more favorable opinion of the movie.

=== Awards ===
- Leo Award for Best Youth or Children's Program or Series (2015, won)
