= Best Player =

2011 television film

- Written by: Richard Amberg
- Directed by: Damon Santostefano
- Starring: Jerry Trainor; Jennette McCurdy; Amir Talai; Janet Varney; Nick Benson; Jean-Luc Bilodeau
- Music by: Adam Cohen
- Countries of origin: United States; Canada
- Original language: English

Production
- Producer: Scott McAboy
- Cinematography: Jon Joffin
- Editor: Tony Lombardo
- Running time: 84 minutes
- Production companies: Pacific Bay Entertainment; Nickelodeon Productions

Original release
- Network: Nickelodeon
- Release: March 13, 2011

Best Player is a 2011 teen comedy television film that aired on Nickelodeon on March 13, 2011. The movie stars Jerry Trainor and Jennette McCurdy, from the show iCarly. Filming started on October 24, 2009, in Victoria, British Columbia, Canada and wrapped up production on November 18, 2009.

== Plot ==
Quincy Johnson is a barely employed adult gamer who lives at home with his parents. Quincy plays video games under the username "Q" and is renowned in the gaming community for his many awards and world records. Much to Quincy's dismay, his parents decide to sell their house, meaning Quincy will need to find a new place of residence. Quincy decides to try to buy the house from them for $175,000.00. He plans on getting the money from a tournament for a new video game called "Black Hole", where the grand prize is $175,000.00. He discusses the dilemma with his number one fan, Wendell. While practicing for the tournament, Quincy finds a player named "Prodigy" whom he cannot defeat. Quincy and Wendell decide to find out who Prodigy really is to secure Quincy's chance of winning the tournament, also because Quincy needs a place to stay. Wendell picks Quincy up and finds out that Prodigy lives nearby. They seek a plan to beat Prodigy while together.

When they find Prodigy's house, Quincy discovers that Prodigy is actually a sullen high school girl named Christina Saunders, ("Chris" for short), who thinks that he is her mom Tracy's internet date. But the plan almost fails when Mr. Johnson, Tracy's real Internet date, arrives, however, Wendell manages to stall him. Quincy decides he will have to go on a date with her, so on his and Tracy's first date, Quincy lies to her, saying that he is a home economics teacher at Chris' school. Tracy tells Chris, in front of Quincy, that if Chris gets any more F's she will not be allowed to play any video games. The next day, Wendell has set up Quincy to be the home economics teacher at Chris's school. Later, Chris goes to science class and is the first to present her project which Quincy and Wendell had sabotaged the previous night so that she would fail and not be able to play in the tournament. It goes awry and ends up with Chris getting an A+, and she gloats to Quincy about the $175,500.00 she will win at the tournament.

The next day, Quincy asks several boys if any one of them will take Chris to the prom, which is on the same day of the tournament. No one shows any interest and they all leave except Sheldon who reveals that he has had an unnoticed crush on Chris. Quincy takes Sheldon to the library and they research pick-up lines on the computer so they can research how to woo Chris. Quincy then tells Sheldon to sign up for the football tryouts. On the football field, Sheldon attempts to ask Chris to the prom, but is tackled by Zastrow , who then gives Sheldon a giant, humiliating wedgie in front of everyone sitting in the bleachers. Zastrow dangles Sheldon by his briefs before Ash convinces Zastrow to let go of Sheldon’s underpants and drop him to the floor. Quincy then realizes that Chris likes Ash.

Later on a field trip to a video arcade planned by Quincy, Ash asks Chris to prom much to her delight. Chris, later on, tells Quincy and Tracy that Ash asked her to the prom, and she will be missing the tournament. Quincy assures her there will be more tournaments, and they look on the Internet for some other tournaments, when Chris sees Quincy on a magazine cover about video games. Realizing Quincy is Q, a furious Chris spitefully decides to "destroy" him at the tournament, even rejecting Ash's prom invitation to do so, while Tracy appears and furiously asks Quincy to leave after he tells her the truth. After leaving, Wendell tells Quincy that he is also competing in the tournament and kicks Quincy out of his house for choosing Tracy over gaming.

The next day they go to the tournament, Quincy, Wendell, and Chris each win in their respective first rounds. Sheldon (going by the name "Shell-Shock") appears, after having been released from the hospital. Quincy admits to Tracy that he loves her and has feelings for her, but Wendell convinces everyone to think it's "smack talk", which inadvertently humiliates and embarrasses Tracy in front of everyone and further worsens the rift between Quincy and Tracy. Tracy, however, who knows that is not true, is not sure about what he said. For the final event, Wendell asks Quincy if he'll work with him to destroy Chris and when they win they will share the award fifty-fifty. Quincy doesn't reply and jumps on Prodigy/Chris; leading everyone on that he will destroy her, but then he works with her to destroy Wendell. But in Quincy's final strike, Wendell and Quincy destroy each other. Chris appears to be the winner, but the game is not over. Sheldon/Shell-Shock, thought to have been defeated, gets up and defeats Chris/Prodigy to win the game.

Ash appears from the crowd to Chris's surprise. He congratulates her despite not winning and says he intended to spend the evening with her anyway, and that there is still time to go to the prom. Quincy apologizes to and reconciles with Tracy and asks her to the prom, to which she accepts. In the ending credits, you see prom photos of Ash, Tracy, Chris, and Quincy.

== Cast ==
- Jerry Trainor as Quincy "Q" Johnson
- Jennette McCurdy as Christina "Chris" Saunders, aka Prodigy
- Janet Varney as Tracy Sanders
- Amir Talai as Wendell
- Jean-Luc Bilodeau as Ash McPhee
- Doug Chapman as Tracy's internet date
- Osric Chau as Ash's friend
- Patricia Drake as a tourist mom
- Kevin Michael Richardson as Black Hole Video game announcer (V.O.)
- Gabrielle Rose as Mrs. Johnson
- Rekha Sharma as Brenda
- Malcolm Stewart as Mr. Johnson
- Calum Worthy as Zastrow
- Nick Benson as Sheldon
- Jan Bos as a contest referee
- Nick Carey as Sheldon's opponent
- Kevin Crofton as tourist dad
- Talon Dunbar as Wendell's opponent
- Nancy Ebert as a high school librarian
- Colin Foo as Old Bobby
- Marc Gaudet as an Italian waiter #1
- Nico Ghisi as Kicker Kid
- Ryan Harder as Benny
- BJ Harrison as public librarian
- Dan Joffre as Mr. Ingleby
- Dejan Loyola as Eviscer8r
- Elfina Luk as Mrs. Chen
- Julia Maxwell as Cindy
- Baljodh Nagra as Mikey
- Lissa Neptuno as Jenny
- Kevin O'Grady as Principal Cooper
- Adom Osei as a laser tag pre-teen
- Jesse Reid as Chris's opponent
- Milo Shandel as an Italian waiter #2
- Karissa Tynes as a permission slip girl
- Jesse Wheeler as Bob

== Home media ==
The film was released on DVD on November 8, 2013, and on Blu-ray on December 4, 2015. On November 3, 2020, the movie was added to Paramount+ (formerly CBS All Access).
