= Jinxed (2013 film) =

American Film

- Genre: Fantasy, comedy
- Written by: Aury Wallington
- Directed by: Stephen Herek
- Starring: Ciara Bravo; Jacob Bertrand; Jack Griffo; Burkely Duffield; Elena Kampouris; Donavon Stinson; Keegan Connor Tracy; Jay Brazeau
- Theme music composer: Jim Dooley
- Countries of origin: United States; Canada
- Original language: English

Production
- Producers: Scott McAboy; Amy Sydorick
- Cinematography: Tom Harting
- Editor: Anita Brandt-Burgoyne
- Running time: 75 minutes
- Production company: Pacific Bay Entertainment
- Budget: $5 million

Original release
- Network: Nickelodeon
- Release: November 29, 2013

Jinxed is a 2013 fantasy comedy film that premiered on Nickelodeon on November 29, 2013. The film stars Ciara Bravo and Jack Griffo, directed by Stephen Herek and produced by Amy Sydorick & Scott McAboy.

It was released to DVD on April 8, 2014, and to Blu-ray on December 4, 2015. The film's premiere was watched by 3.2 million viewers.

== Plot ==
In 1913, the luckiest man in town Tommy Murphy (Burkely Duffield) is overjoyed when the girl of his dreams, Caitlin O'Leary (Andrea Brooks), agrees to dance with him at the town festival, despite rumors that she is a witch (known as a young gypsy woman). The event is ruined when a young woman named Violet (Jessa Danielson) surprises him by showing her feelings for Tommy by kissing him in front of his date. Tommy tries to keep Caitlin from running off, only for him to accidentally tear her dress, revealing her underwear. Feeling humiliated, she curses Tommy and all of his descendants with incredibly bad luck. He tries to find her so they can reconcile and reverse the curse, but is heartbroken when he learns that she married someone else.

One hundred years later, his great-great-granddaughter, Meg Murphy (Ciara Bravo), is desperate to end the family's curse, despite warnings from her parents and grandfather. After finding Tommy's diary she learns that to get rid of the curse, she needs to give Tommy's "lucky coin" to a descendant of Caitlin. With help from her younger brother, Charlie (Jacob Bertrand) she successfully manage to steal their great-great-grandfather Tommy's lucky coin from the Harvest Hills Historical Museum. Afterward, Meg realizes that Ivy Murray (Elena Kampouris), a mean girl at school that picks on her, is a descendant of the O'Leary family and decides to give her the coin; her crush, Brett (Jack Griffo), asks her to the festival and she realizes that he's also a descendant of Caitlin (being Ivy's cousin). At the dance, she gives him the lucky coin, hoping to break her curse; however, a missing piece of Tommy's diary winds up in Charlie's hands, and reading it, Charlie realizes the coin ends up transferring the curse to Brett's family.

Meg, after learning the outcome from her parents and grandfather, becomes shocked and guilty after realizing what she has done, believing it is too late to reverse the effects. When asked by her mother on why she wanted the curse gone in the first place, Meg says it is because she wants to be happy. Her mom explains that she was never born with a curse, but that she chose to marry into it anyway, because being with Meg's father has made her more happier in her life, and that the situations in life don't matter, but rather it is the way a person chooses handle it. After her grandfather informs her that the effects of transferring the curse will become permanent at the end of the festival (which is after the closing cermony), a reinvigorated Meg rushes over to Brett's place to find it ransacked by a monkey. Ivy answers the door and gets angry upon learning that the bad luck came from Meg giving Brett the coin. Meg manages to convince Ivy that she never intended to cause any trouble, and Ivy realizes she's always been mean to Meg since her cursed accidents affected her as well but finally realizes that it's not Meg's fault. The two reconcile and race to the closing ceremony, where Brett gives Meg the coin back. She gets struck by lightning and almost falls off a flag tower but is saved by Brett, who kisses her.

Afterward, Meg and Ivy become best friends, and she and Brett start dating. Meg goes to science camp and a cursed accident makes her invent a potion that grows hair on bald heads. She puts Tommy's diary back with the coin after learning in the last part that Tommy, due to his bad luck, finds happiness in meeting his beautiful wife at the hospital and throws his coin into the fountain, causing a flood. Even so, he too believes that it's the attitude that counts.

Meg and her family go on vacation to visit the Grand Canyon and cause more bad luck with Ivy and Brett running for their lives but laughing about it.

The Murphys' family name, Murphy, is a play-on-words to Murphy's law, an adage stating that "Anything that can go wrong will go wrong."

== Cast ==
- Ciara Bravo as Meg Murphy, the main character, whose family is cursed
- Jacob Bertrand as Charlie Murphy, Meg's younger brother
- Jack Griffo as Brett, Ivy's cousin
- Burkely Duffield as Tommy Murphy, Meg's great-great-grandfather
- Elena Kampouris as Ivy Murray, Brett's cousin
- Donavon Stinson as Dad, Meg's father
- Keegan Connor Tracy as Mom, Meg's mother
- Jay Brazeau as Grandpa, Meg's grandfather
- Andrea Brooks as Caitlin O'Leary, Brett and Ivy's great-great-grandmother
- Jessa Danielson as Violet Maws
- Carmel Amit as Gypsy Woman, a fortune teller
- Kwesi Ameyaw as Mayor
