= The Boy Who Cried Werewolf (2010 film) =

2010 American film directed by Eric Bross

- Promotional poster
- Genre: Comedy horror
- Written by: Art Edler Brown; Douglas Sloan
- Directed by: Eric Bross
- Starring: Victoria Justice; Chase Ellison; Brooke D'Orsay; Matt Winston; Steven Grayham; Brooke Shields
- Theme music composer: John Van Tongeren
- Countries of origin: United States; Canada
- Original languages: English; Romanian

Production
- Producers: Scott McAboy; Emily Musgrave
- Cinematography: Robert McLachlan
- Editor: Sue Blainey
- Running time: 83 minutes
- Production companies: Pacific Bay Entertainment; KNB EFX Group; Nickelodeon Productions

Original release
- Network: Nickelodeon
- Release: October 23, 2010

The Boy Who Cried Werewolf is a 2010 Nickelodeon television comedy horror film starring Victoria Justice, Chase Ellison, Matt Winston, Brooke D'Orsay, Steven Grayhm, and Brooke Shields. The screenplay was written by Art Edler Brown and Douglas Sloan, and the film follows Jordan Sands, an awkward 17-year-old girl who, along with her family, inherits a castle in Romania. While exploring the castle, Jordan accidentally steps on a vial of werewolf blood and becomes infected, transforming into a werewolf herself. It was filmed in Vancouver, British Columbia, Canada. The film aired on Nickelodeon on October 23, 2010.

== Plot ==
Jordan Sands is an awkward and nerdy 17-year-old girl with a bad case of allergies who became the woman of the house after the recent death of her mother. Her father, David, struggles to make ends meet, while her 14-year-old brother Hunter (Chase Ellison) drives the family crazy with gory pranks as he loves monsters. They inherit their mother's great-uncle Dragomir Ducovic's castle in Wolfsberg, Romania, which they did not know existed. After arriving in Wolfsberg, they meet the strange and steely castle housekeeper, Madame Varcolac, whose name, when pronounced, causes a wolf to howl in the distance.

Meanwhile, the kids explore the town. Hunter learns about the "Wolfsberg Beast", a monster that protects both the castle and the town, and Jordan falls in love with the local butcher Goran. Varcolac discourages David from selling the property, but he decides to, so that they can end their financial struggles. He dates the bubbly real estate agent Paulina von Eckberg, who handles the selling and only appears at night.

While snooping around Dragomir's lab, Jordan accidentally steps on a vial of blood. Although Hunter pulls the bloody glass from her foot, her behavior changes. She becomes a carnivore (at the beginning of the film, she mentions having tofu stir-fry for dinner, because of her vegetarian diet), her senses heighten, gains a playful dog-like temperament, she plays with the dogs at a nearby park, her hair starts to curl up naturally, her allergies disappear, no longer needs glasses and starts to grow body hair rapidly. Hunter's friends explain that Jordan has become a werewolf due to either a bloodline curse, a werewolf bite or becoming infected with the blood of a werewolf. Hunter realizes it was the vial of blood, revealed to have been LB-217, short for "Lycanthrope Blood".

Jordan transforms into a werewolf, which Hunter witnesses. She holds back from attacking Hunter and flees. Hunter's friends reveal that there is no cure they know of, other than killing a werewolf with a silver bullet. Hunter refuses to do this. His friends warn that if Jordan is not cured by next sunrise, she will remain a werewolf, cursed to shift every night until she dies.

Hunter turns to Varcolac, who reveals that Dragomir was also a werewolf and was the famed "Wolfsberg Beast". Vampires attempted to take over the castle and rise to power, but Dragomir had stopped them before he was killed. Before his death, he had been working on a cure for lycanthropy. As Varcolac quickly gathers the ingredients for the treatment, Paulina captures the siblings, revealing herself as a vampire and the one who had killed Dragomir. She wants to take over the manor, but must kill Jordan first, as she is unable to take the castle as long as Dragomir's werewolf relatives are alive. Jordan is restrained in her werewolf form while Hunter escapes and leads David to the hideout, but they are also captured.

Before Paulina can shoot Jordan, Hunter suddenly turns into a werewolf, as he is part of the bloodline, making him a true descendant unlike Jordan. The siblings fight the vampires until the sun rises and the vampires are killed in the sunlight. In the manor, Hunter's blood is used in the antidote and it successfully subdues Jordan's werewolf self and reverts her to her normal state. The Sands family formally receives the money they had inherited from Dragomir, which is enough for them to keep the castle and their original home, as Dragomir had supposedly invented karaoke. Hunter becomes the Wolfsberg Beast, his true destiny and takes Dragomir's place.

The family returns home, where Jordan demonstrates a new confidence at school, revealing to the audience and the Sands family that she has somehow kept her werewolf powers. Goran also moves to California as a foreign exchange student and they start a romantic relationship. In a twist, Paulina had somehow survived and had moved to their neighbourhood to continue her attempts at taking over the castle.

The film ends as the cast sings and dances to "...Baby One More Time" on karaoke.

== Cast ==
- Victoria Justice as Jordan Sands
- Chase Ellison as Hunter Sands
- Brooke D'Orsay as Paulina Von Eckberg
- Matt Winston as David Sands
- Steven Grayhm as Goran
- Brooke Shields as Madame Olga Varcolac
- Alex Diakun as Igor Van Helman Stanislavsky/Cloaked Figure
- Anna Galvin as Jacqueline Carlsberg
- Andrea Brooks as Ashley Edwards
- Christie Laing as Tiffany Whit
- Valerie Tian as Debbie
- Jillian Marie as KC (as Jillian Marie Hubert)
- Cainan Wiebe as Rob Wright
- Meshach Peters as Richard Montgomery
- Kerry James as Cort McCann
- Erica Carroll as Katrina Sands
- Ben Cotton as the Cab Driver
- Patrick Sabongui as Monster Fan Dude
- Marci T. House as Coach Harbaugh
- Heather Doerksen as Assistant Coach

== Home media ==
The film was released on DVD on November 8, 2013, and on Blu-ray on December 4, 2015.

== Reception ==
The movie received generally mixed reviews from critics for its plotline, though was generally praised for its sound effects. Felix Vasques Jr. of CinemaCrazed stated, "The Boy Who Cried Werewolf ends up being a surprisingly solid family horror comedy that isn't as soapy or girly as I originally assumed it would be. Within the pandering to preteens salivating after Justice, there is also a solid however flawed and derivative story and some wicked special effects."

Brian Lowry of Variety called the film inoffensive and cheap, finding little to recommend. Emily Ashby of Common Sense Media gave the rate four stars out of five, stating it was a "cute family flick isn't too hair-raising for tweens."

=== Nominations ===
- Young Artist Award for Best Performance in a TV Movie, Miniseries or Special – Leading Young Actress – Victoria Justice (2011)
