= Isabela Merced =

American actress (born 2001)

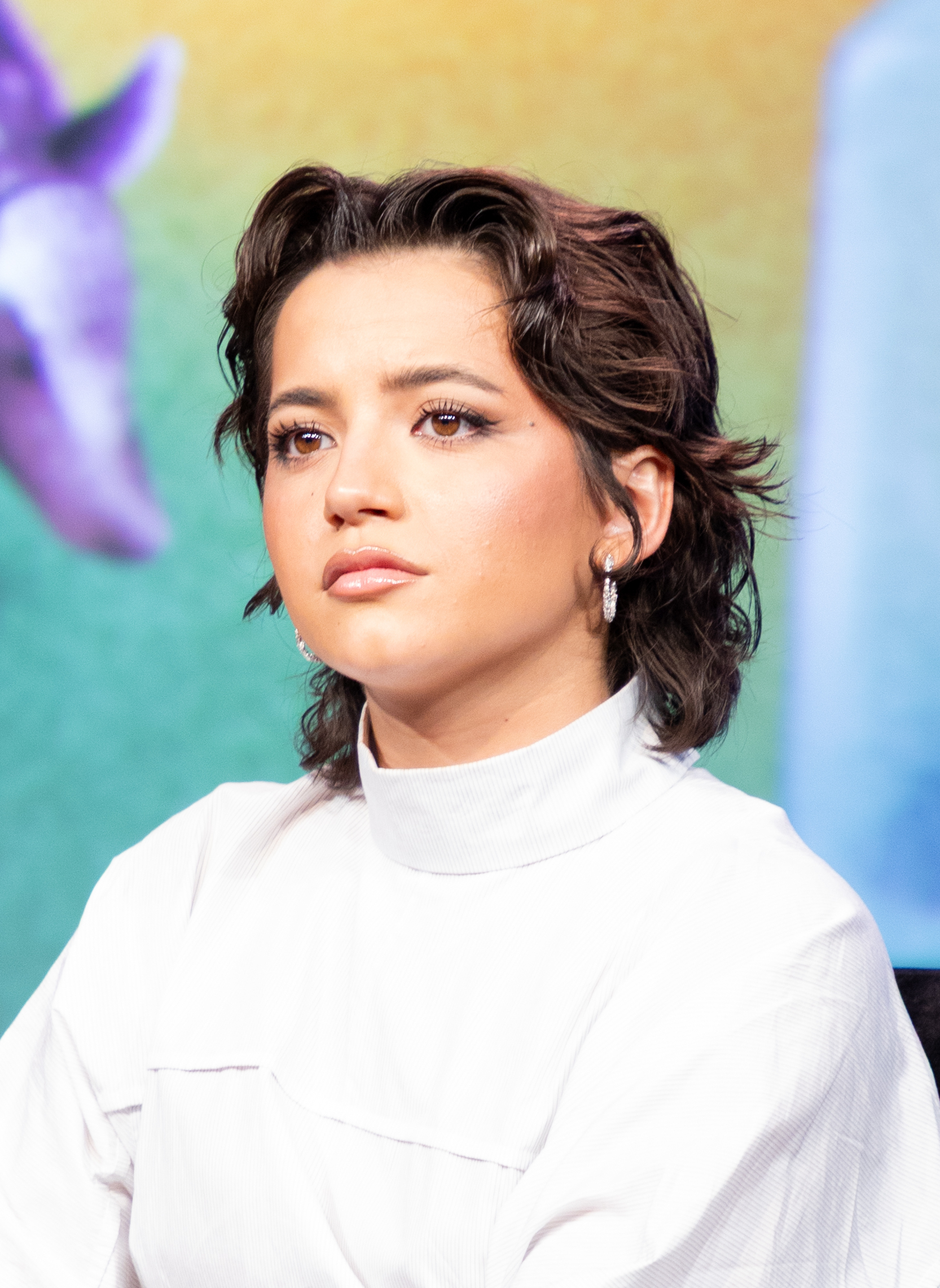
- Merced at SXSW 2025
- Born: Isabela Yolanda Moner; July 10, 2001 (age 25); Cleveland, Ohio, U.S.
- Other name: Isabela Yolanda Moner Pizzaro
- Citizenship: American; Peruvian
- Occupations: Actress; singer
- Years active: 2013–present

Isabela Yolanda Moner (born July 10, 2001), known professionally as Isabela Merced since 2019, is an American actress and singer. She played the lead role in the Nickelodeon television series 100 Things to Do Before High School (2014–2016), and went on to feature in the films Transformers: The Last Knight (2017), Instant Family (2018), and Sicario: Day of the Soldado (2018). She starred as the titular character in the adventure film Dora and the Lost City of Gold (2019) and played main roles in the films Madame Web, Turtles All the Way Down, and Alien: Romulus (all in 2024). In 2025, she had a starring role as Dina in the second season of the HBO series The Last of Us and played Hawkgirl in the DCU film Superman and series Peacemaker.

== Early life ==
Merced was born on July 10, 2001, in Cleveland, Ohio. She is the daughter of Katerine, a nurse, who was born in Lima, Peru, and Patrick Moner, a firefighter, who was born in Louisiana.

Merced has stated that Spanish was her first language, and she struggled with English when she first started grade school, adding that she considers herself "half Peruvian and half from Ohio. I wish I could say I'm 100% Peruvian; I've always felt that way." She has two brothers. At age 15, she was accepted into college.

Merced began acting after her family's Cleveland home was destroyed by a fire. Her father was one of the firefighters on call that night. She was a Judy Garland fan, so her parents, in an attempt to distract her from the loss, encouraged Merced to audition for a local production of The Wizard of Oz. She agreed and was cast as a Munchkin. She attended the Fairmount Performing Arts Conservatory, led by Broadway producer Fred Sternfeld, who tried to persuade Merced's mother into taking her to New York to pursue auditions. After some reluctance, her mother agreed, and the family moved to New York City for a month to help Merced pursue a career on Broadway.

== Career ==
Merced has said that she wanted to be an actress from a young age, inspired by movies featuring Shirley Temple and Judy Garland and starting in local community theatre at age six. Merced booked her first job, a Claritin commercial, on what was supposed to be her last day in New York City during the summer she spent auditioning there. She made her Broadway debut at age ten in a production of Evita, in which she sang in Spanish with Ricky Martin.

Merced's first starring performance was as CJ Martin, the lead role on the Nickelodeon television series 100 Things to Do Before High School, from 2014 to 2016. That same year, she began providing the voice of Kate, one of the main characters in the Dora the Explorer spin-off, Dora and Friends: Into the City!, a role she performed from 2014 to 2017. In 2015, she appeared as Lori Collins in the Nickelodeon Original Movie Splitting Adam, and was cast as Sadie, one of the leading roles, in the 2016 Nickelodeon Original Movie Legends of the Hidden Temple. Merced's debut album Stopping Time (2015) was produced by Broadway Records.

In May 2016, Merced was cast in the film Transformers: The Last Knight, which was released in June 2017. She voiced Heather in the animated film The Nut Job 2: Nutty by Nature, which was theatrically released on August 11, 2017.

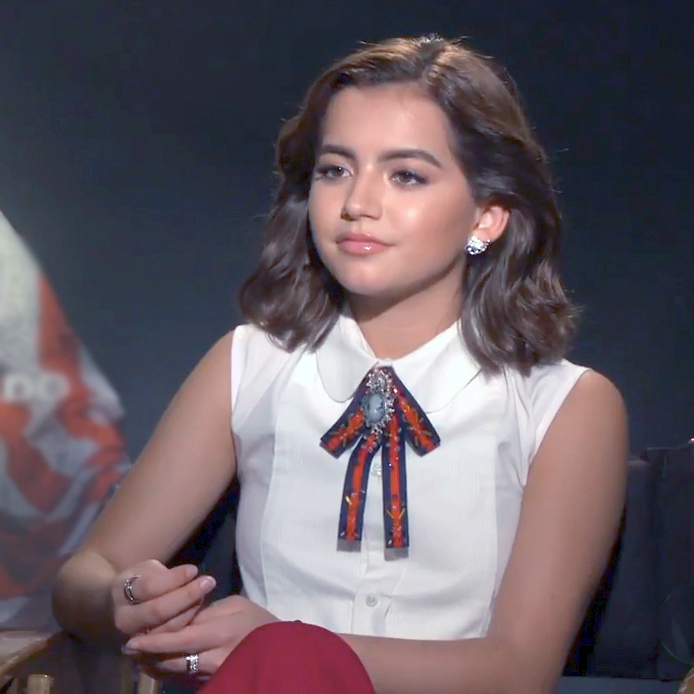
Merced in 2018

In 2018, Merced had a major role in Sicario: Day of the Soldado, playing the daughter of a drug cartel head, in a performance acclaimed by critics. The New Yorker's Anthony Lane wrote "[Merced] is terrific, and her character's fortunes can be read in her eyes—blazing to begin with, as she scraps with another girl in a schoolyard, but dark and blank by the end, their youthful fire doused by the violence that she has seen."

In the same year, she played the adopted daughter of the characters played by Mark Wahlberg and Rose Byrne in the comedy film Instant Family, for which she also wrote and sang the song "I'll Stay". In 2019, Merced starred as the title character in Dora and the Lost City of Gold, a live action film adaptation of the animated series, and was cast in the Christmas romantic comedy ensemble film Let It Snow. The same year, she was cast opposite Jason Momoa in the film Sweet Girl for Netflix.

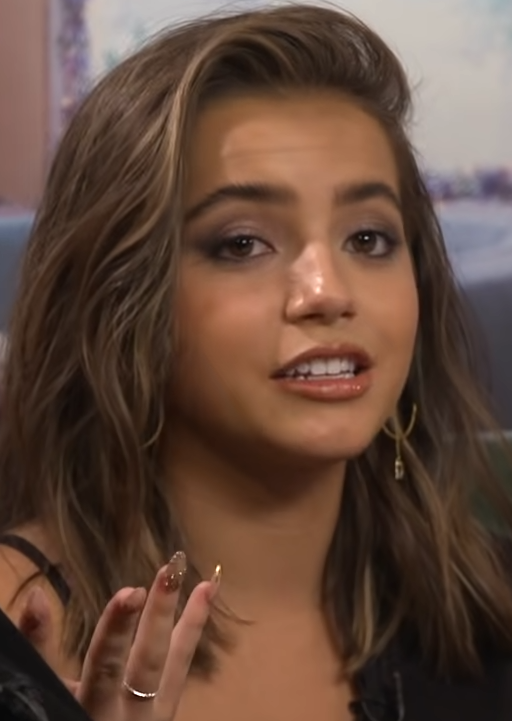
Merced in 2019

On October 14, 2019, she announced that she had decided to use the stage name Isabela Merced in memory of her deceased grandmother. Her first single, "Papi", was released in 2019, followed by her first music video released on November 6, 2019. Merced released her debut EP The Better Half of Me in 2020 through Republic Records and was named one of Billboard's top 15 new Peruvian artists to listen to in July 2020.

In 2024, she starred in Turtles All the Way Down, a film adaptation of the 2017 novel by John Green, and Fede Álvarez's Alien: Romulus. In April 2025, Merced appeared as Dina in season 2 of The Last of Us. In July 2025, Merced appeared as Kendra Saunders / Hawkgirl in the DC Universe (DCU) film Superman (2025).

In August 2025, TVLine named Merced the year's Drama Star to Watch, as part of Women to Watch. Additionally, Variety recognized her in their annual Power of Young Hollywood Impact Report; those recognized "rep the future of the entertainment business".

In February 2026, it was announced that Merced would be starring and executive producing in Sega's The House of the Dead live-action film adaptation, with Paul W. S. Anderson directing.

== Personal life ==
Merced describes herself as having been "queer my whole life", and has been in "queer relationships". She says she aims to "do her part" for the queer community in American pop culture. She attributes her Catholic upbringing to her having been "closeted out of being complicit and somebody who has accepted, maybe suppressing their queerness for their environment, basically, and to adapt."

She has polyendocrine metabolic ovarian syndrome and has attended therapy and openly discussed her struggles with anxiety.

== Filmography ==
Key
†	Denotes productions that have not yet been released

=== Film ===
Year	Title	Role	Notes
2013	The House That Jack Built	Young Nadia	
2016	Middle School: The Worst Years of My Life	Jeanne Galleta	
2017	Transformers: The Last Knight	Izabella Yeager	
2017	The Nut Job 2: Nutty by Nature	Heather (voice)	
2018	Sicario: Day of the Soldado	Isabel Reyes	
2018	Instant Family	Lizzy	
2019	Dora and the Lost City of Gold	Dora Márquez	Final credit as Isabela Moner
2019	Let It Snow	Julie	First credit as Isabela Merced
2021	Spirit Untamed	Lucky Prescott (voice)	
2021	Sweet Girl	Rachel Cooper	
2022	Father of the Bride	Cora Herrera	
2022	Rosaline	Juliet	
2023	Migration	Kim (voice)	
2024	Madame Web	Anya Corazon	
2024	Turtles All the Way Down	Aza Holmes	
2024	Alien: Romulus	Kay Harrison	
2025	Superman	Kendra Saunders / Hawkgirl	
2027	Man of Tomorrow †	Kendra Saunders / Hawkgirl	Post-production
TBA	Psyche †	Camila	Post-production; also executive producer
TBA	Ibelin †		Post-production

=== Television ===
Year	Title	Role	Notes
2014	Growing Up Fisher	Jenny	Recurring role, 7 episodes
2014–2017	Dora and Friends: Into the City!	Kate	Main voice role
2014–2016	100 Things to Do Before High School	CJ Martin	Lead role
2015	Splitting Adam	Lori Collins	Television film
2016	Legends of the Hidden Temple	Sadie	Television film
2019	The Amazing Race Canada	Herself	Episode: "Clamageddon Continues"
2020	#KidsTogether: The Nickelodeon Town Hall	Herself	Television special
2021	Maya and the Three	Widow Queen (voice)	Miniseries
2024	Rock Paper Scissors	The Susan (voice)	Episode: "The Susan"
2025–present	The Last of Us	Dina	Main role (seasons 2–3), 7 episodes
2025	Peacemaker	Kendra Saunders / Hawkgirl	Episode: "The Ties That Grind"

=== Video games ===
Year	Title	Role	Notes
2017	Kingdom Hearts χ Back Cover	Ava	Short film; voice role
2021	Spirit: Lucky's Big Adventure	Lucky Prescott	

== Discography ==
=== Studio albums ===
Title	Details
Stopping Time (as Isabela Moner)	Released: September 18, 2015; Label: Broadway Records; Formats: CD, Digital download, streaming

=== Extended plays ===
Title	Details
The Better Half of Me	Released: May 22, 2020; Label: Republic Records; Formats: CD, Digital download, streaming; Track listing: 1. "Apocalipsis"; 2. "Todo Esta Bien"; 3. "Lovin Kind"; 4. "Chocolate"; 5. "The Chase"

=== Singles ===
Year	Title	Album
2019	"PAPI"	Non-album single
2020	"Don't Go"	Non-album single
2020	"Don't Go" (Spanish Version)	Non-album single
2020	"Caliente Navidad"	Non-album single
2022	"Agonía" (with Kayfex)	Non-album single
2024	"Cuffing Season"	Non-album single
2025	"Apocalipsis (versión salsa)" with Tony Succar	Non-album single

=== Featured artist ===
Year	Title	Artist
2018	"My Only One (No Hay Nadie Más)"	Sebastián Yatra
2018	"Lista de Espera"	Matt Hunter

=== Promotional singles ===
Year	Title	Album
2018	"I'll Stay" (from Instant Family)	Non-album single
2021	"Fearless (Valiente Duet)" (from Spirit Untamed)	Non-album single

== Awards and nominations ==
Year	Award	Category	Work	Result	Ref.
2015	Imagen Awards	Best Young Actress – Television	100 Things to Do Before High School	Nominated	
2016	Imagen Awards	Best Young Actor – Television	100 Things to Do Before High School	Won	
2017	Teen Choice Awards	Choice Summer Movie Actress	Transformers: The Last Knight	Nominated	
2017	CinemaCon Award	Rising Star of the Year	—N/a	Won	
2017	Young Entertainers Award	Best Young Ensemble Cast – Feature Film	Middle School: The Worst Years of My Life	Nominated	
2019	Young Entertainers Award	Best Leading Young Actress	Instant Family	Won	
2019	Imagen Awards	Best Actress – Feature Film	Instant Family	Won	
2020	Imagen Awards	Best Actress – Feature Film	Dora and the Lost City of Gold	Won	
2024	Imagen Awards	Best Actress – Drama (Television)	Turtles All the Way Down	Nominated	
2024	SCAD Savannah Film Festival	Rising Star Award	—N/a	Won	
2025	National Hispanic Media Coalition	Next Generation Impact Award	—N/a	Won	
2025	Astra TV Awards	Best Supporting Actress in a Drama Series	The Last of Us	Won	
2025	Pride Awards	Best Supporting Actress in a Motion Picture or Series/Miniseries	The Last of Us	Won	
2025	Imagen Awards	Best Supporting Actress – Feature Film	Alien: Romulus	Nominated	
