= Lights Out =

Lights Out may refer to:

== Events and times ==
- Institutional, and thence colloquial, term for bedtime
- Lights Out (event), an event in the UK on 4 August 2014 to commemorate the start of World War I
- Lights Out Hong Kong, a campaign to protest air pollution
- 88888 Lights Out, a program in India to increase awareness of climate change

== Technology ==
- Lights out (manufacturing), a manufacturing methodology
- Lights-out management or out-of-band management, a technology for network device maintenance
- HP Integrated Lights-Out, a server management technology

== People ==
- Brad Lidge (born 1976), American baseball pitcher
- Chris Lytle (born 1974), American mixed martial arts fighter
- Shawne Merriman (born 1984), American football player
- James Toney (born 1968), American boxer

== Film, television, and radio ==
=== Films ===
- Lights Out (1923 film), a 1923 American silent film
- Lights Out (1953 film), a 1953 Brazilian drama film
- Lights Out (2010 film), a 2010 French film
- Lights Out (2013 film), a 2013 horror short film by David F. Sandberg
- Lights Out (2016 film), an American supernatural horror film
- Lights Out (2024 film), an American film

=== Television episodes ===
- "Lights Out" (6teen), 2006
- "Lights Out" (American Restoration), 2010
- "Lights Out" (The Bad News Bears), 1980
- "Lights Out" (The Brady Bunch), 1971
- "Lights Out" (Brooklyn Nine-Nine), 2020
- "Lights Out" (Brothers & Sisters), 2010
- "Lights Out" (Camp Lazlo), 2005
- "Lights Out!" (Clifford the Big Red Dog), 2003
- "Lights Out!" (El Chavo Animado), 2006
- "Lights Out" (ER), 2007
- "Lights Out" (The Fairly OddParents), 2011
- "Lights Out" (Glee), 2013
- "Lights Out" (Grossology), 2007
- "Lights Out" (Hit the Floor), 2013
- "Lights Out" (Invasion), 2005
- "Lights Out" (Out of the Blue), 1995
- "Lights Out!" (Ozzy & Drix), 2003
- "Lights Out" (Rob Dyrdek's Fantasy Factory), 2009
- "Lights Out" (Still Game), 2007

=== Other uses in television and radio ===
- Lights Out (radio show), a 1930s/1940s American radio program
- Lights Out (1946 TV series), a series based on the radio show
- Lights Out (1949-1952 TV series), American TV series based on the radio series
- Lights Out (2011 TV series), an American boxing drama series
- Lights Out with David Spade, an American late-night talk show

== Games ==
- Lights Out (game), a 1995 electronic puzzle
- Dark Fall II: Lights Out, a 2004 computer game
- The Fight: Lights Out, a 2010 action fighting video game

== Literature ==
- Lights Out (book), a 2020 book about General Electric by Thomas Gryta and Ted Mann
- Lights Out (manhwa), a 1993–1994 Korean comic by Lee Myung-jin
- Lights Out (comics), a 1958 Disney comic by Carl Barks
- Lights Out, a 1945 novel by Baynard Kendrick

== Music ==
=== Song cycle ===
- Lights Out, an orchestral song cycle by Ivor Gurney with words by Edward Thomas

=== Albums ===
- Lights Out (Antimatter album), or the title song, 2003
- Lights Out (Ezhel and Ufo361 album), or the title song, 2019
- Lights Out (Fall River album), 2005
- Lights Out (Graveyard album), 2012
- Lights Out (Ingrid Michaelson album), 2014
- Lights Out (Lil Wayne album), 2000
- Lights Out (Peter Wolf album), or the title song, 1984
- Lights Out (Silverline album), or the title song, 2013
- Lights Out (Sugarcult album), or the title song, 2006
- Lights Out (UFO album), or the title song, 1977
- Lights Out!, by Jackie McLean, 1956
- Lights Out, by Bishop Allen, 2014
- Lights Out, by Nine, 2001
- Lights Out, by Posthum, 2012
- Lights Out, by Steve Lawler, 2002

=== Songs ===
- "Lights Out" (Breaking Benjamin song)
- "Lights Out" (Lisa Marie Presley song)
- "Lights Out" (Peter Wolf song)
- "Lights Out" (Rick Astley song)
- "Lights Out" (Royal Blood song)
- "Lights Out" (Santigold song)
- "Lights Out" (Silverline song)
- "Lights Out" (Virginia to Vegas song)
- "Lights Out", by Jerry Byrne
- "Lights Out", by The Angry Samoans from Back from Samoa
- "Lights Out", by Attila from Rage
- "Lights Out", written by Billy Hill
- "Lights Out", by Car Bomb from Meta
- "Lights Out", by Danity Kane from Welcome to the Dollhouse
- "Lights Out", by Estelle from Lovers Rock
- "Lights Out", by Fabolous from There Is No Competition 2: The Grieving Music EP
- "Lights Out", by Green Day, a B-side from the single "Know Your Enemy"
- "Lights Out", by Hollywood Undead from American Tragedy
- "Lights Out", by classical composer Ivor Gurney
- "Lights Out", by Khleo Thomas
- "Lights Out", by Mack 10 from Ghetto, Gutter & Gangster
- "Lights Out", by The Mighty Mighty Bosstones from Ska-Core, the Devil, and More
- "Lights Out", by Mindless Self Indulgence from If
- "Lights Out", by Owen from I Do Perceive
- "Lights Out", by P.O.D. from Testify
- "Lights Out", by Savatage from Edge of Thorns
- "Lights Out", by Sonic Youth from Rather Ripped
- "Lights Out", by Vein.fm from This World Is Going to Ruin You
- "Lights Out", by We Are the In Crowd from Guaranteed to Disagree
- "Lights Out (Go Crazy)", by Junior Caldera ft. Far East Movement and Natalia Kills

== See also ==
- Earth Hour, a global event to increase awareness of climate change
- Lights Out match, a professional wrestling match type
- Lights Off (disambiguation)
- Lights On (disambiguation)
