= Wishology! =

95th - 100th episodes of the sixth season of The Fairly OddParents

- The Fairly OddParents episodes
- Film poster without title (From left to right: Jorgen, Cosmo, Poof, Timmy, Wanda, Mrs. Turner, and Mr. Turner)
- Episode nos.: Season 6 Episodes 95–100
- Directed by: Butch Hartman
- Written by: Kevin Sullivan; Scott Fellows; Butch Hartman
- Production code: FOP-291 - FOP-302
- Original air date: May 1, 2009–May 3, 2009
- Running time: 135 minutes (45 minutes per part)

Guest appearances
- Brendan Fraser as Turbo Thunder; Gary Anthony Sturgis as Lead Eliminator / Destructinator; Patrick Warburton as M.E.R.F. agents; Gene Simmons as himself; Paul Stanley as himself

Episode chronology
← Previous "Birthday Bashed!" / "Momnipresent"	Next → "Anti-Poof"
- The Fairly OddParents season 6

"Wishology!" is a trilogy of television films serving as the ninth special of the American animated television series The Fairly OddParents. The first part of the trilogy, "The Big Beginning", originally aired on the cable network Nickelodeon in the United States on May 1, 2009; the second part, "The Exciting Middle Part", aired on May 2; and the last of the three parts, "The Final Ending", aired on May 3. The trilogy was written by Kevin Sullivan, Scott Fellows, and series creator Butch Hartman, who also served as director. According to Nielsen ratings, the first and third parts of the trilogy were viewed by 4 million people, while its second part garnered 3.6 million viewers. Critical reviewers displayed mixed reactions to how three-dimensional objects interact via computer animation with the series' usual two-dimensional artwork in the trilogy. Composer Guy Moon, who has worked throughout the series, won an Annie Award for his music in the first part of the trilogy in 2010.

Wishology! centers on the show's main character, 10-year-old Timmy Turner, his fairy godparents Cosmo and Wanda, and his baby fairy godbrother Poof, all of whom grant Timmy's wishes. Robots known as Eliminators appear in Timmy's hometown, Dimmsdale, to destroy the "chosen one", Timmy himself. Jorgen von Strangle, a non-floating fairy general who uses an oversized wand, takes him to the Cave of Destiny, a cave that contains prophecies for the "chosen one". The cave is located in Fairy World, a place that sits on a cloud in space and is connected to Earth by a rainbow bridge. Jorgen explains a legend inscribed on the cave wall about the ancient fairy warriors who fought Eliminators and their master, a giant black hole called The Darkness. To defeat The Darkness and Eliminators, Timmy must retrieve and use three special wands: the white wand, the wind wand, and the ice wand.

In addition to the main cast, the trilogy features guest performances, most notably, Gary Anthony Sturgis who provides the voice of the Lead Eliminator, later becoming the Destructinator. Gene Simmons and Paul Stanley from the rock band Kiss, who serve as protectors of the white wand. Patrick Warburton provides his voice for the agents of the Military Extraterrestrial Research Facility (abbreviated M.E.R.F.), and Brendan Fraser voices Turbo Thunder, a warrior who believes he is the true chosen one. In addition to its cultural references to various media, Wishology contains parodies of fantasy and science fiction films: The Matrix, The Lord of the Rings, Harry Potter, The Terminator, Men in Black, Back to the Future, and Star Wars.

== Plot ==
=== "The Big Beginning" ===
Timmy makes a wish to star in his own movie trilogy (In parodies of The Matrix, Lord of the Rings, and Harry Potter despite Harry Potter not being a trilogy). He is interrupted by Jorgen, who takes his fairy godparents away and sends Timmy home. When he gets there, Timmy's parents and school friends do not remember him, and an Eliminator appears after Timmy calls out his own name. In an alley, the Eliminator projects a space vortex through its mouth to inhale Timmy. Jorgen saves him and the two ride off on the fairy motorcycle. The Eliminator is flying in the air, but Jorgen pulls down the thruster, the magic wand glows and teleport to Fairy World, it disappears and leaving behind a trail of fire (in a reference to Back to the Future). They arrive at Fairy World. Meanwhile, the fairies are hidden as gumballs inside a truck stop bar by Jorgen. After being blown into a bubble from a kid's mouth, Cosmo takes Wanda and Poof with him as he floats away. The rest of the fairies use Cosmo's method as their escape plan.

At the Cave of Destiny, Jorgen explains to Timmy the cave prophecy, where in ancient times fairy warriors, represented by stars in space, fought and eliminated a cosmic entity known as The Darkness with light. The ancient fairies also hid a powerful white wand, which is to be found and possessed by the chosen one, Timmy Turner. As stars in space disappear and The Darkness approaches, Timmy arrives back on Earth and tracks his godparents down in Las Vegas, where the Middle-Aged Rock Festival (M.A.R.F.) is held. The M.A.R.F. features the rock band Kiss, who reveal to Timmy that they are the Magical Order of Rocking Fairies (M.O.R.F.), an intergalactic team that is in charge of protecting the white wand, which is Ace Frehley's star-shaped guitar. The Darkness and Eliminators arrive at the venue, and the fairies arrive to defeat the Eliminators, while Timmy defeats The Darkness with a rock solo performance on the white wand. A celebration follows at Fairy World, where Turbo Thunder, the person who was supposed to be the chosen one (whose description matches Timmy's except as a muscular adult, aside from having the same initials), appears and takes the white wand from Timmy.

=== "The Exciting Middle Part" ===
Eliminators and The Darkness invade Yugopotamia—a planet that is home to squid-like aliens called Yugopotamians—and steal "fake-i-fiers", belts that allow users to transform into anyone else. Yugopotamian prince Mark Chang goes to Earth. Meanwhile, in Fairyworld, Timmy and Cosmo are watching Timmy Turner's Chosen One movie. Mark arrives and notifies Timmy that The Darkness is back, and the group discovers that there is a second part to the cave prophecy: Timmy must find the wind wand, located at the Blue Moon. Timmy and Mark teleport back to Dimmsdale, only to discover Timmy's parents and friends are now Eliminators in disguise. Because his real parents and friends have been kidnapped by Eliminators, Timmy seeks help from people who hate him: Mr. Crocker, Dark Laser, and Vicky. Setting their differences aside, everyone cooperates and boards Dark Laser's death pod and depart into space (in a spoof of Star Wars Episode IV: A New Hope). During their rest stop at planet Frigidarium, the aliens inside the cantina are Eliminators who send Timmy's enemies to the Abracatraz Prison in Fairy World. Turbo Thunder saves Timmy and Mark from the corrupting planet, and the three eventually arrive at the Blue Moon, where the rock guardian effortlessly defeats Turbo Thunder when he tries to take the wind wand by force, and grants it to Timmy, who he dubs as the true chosen one for his compassion and selfless intentions.

Meanwhile, Eliminators incarcerate the fairies at the Abracatraz Prison and put Timmy's friends and family in the same cell with Timmy's godparents and Jorgen. After Poof frees the group and locates the wands, Jorgen takes everyone to the Blue Moon. Timmy's friends, enemies, family, and the fairies defeat Eliminators with a combined magical attack and have a reunion with Timmy, which is interrupted when The Darkness tries to inhale him. The wind wand produces no effect, and Timmy realizes he has no other choice, so he sacrifices himself into The Darkness, but Cosmo tells Timmy that he would totally stand back and saw the so-called the famous scene throws the candy-filled dynamite into the Darkness that he put it inside and creates a massive explosion after sharing a kiss with his long-time crush Trixie, leaving the others to mourn.

=== "The Final Ending" ===
Timmy wakes up in what looks like his bedroom; in reality he is still inside The Darkness, and the world is merely an illusion to him. Timmy's fairy godparents and Jorgen come to rescue him, and they exit The Darkness successfully. Back on Earth, the Lead Eliminator (having rebelled against the Darkness) uses Jorgen's wand to poof Timmy's friends and family away into The Darkness. Military Extraterrestrial Research Facility (M.E.R.F.) agents launch an array of military weapons at the Eliminator, but he absorbs the ordnance and turns into a more powerful version, the Destructinator. He surrounds the Earth with a steel casing, which transforms the M.E.R.F. agents into his henchmen. They plant explosives inside Earth and give the Destructinator a detonation remote.

Timmy and his fairies return to the Blue Moon via M.E.R.F.'s escape pod to retrieve the wind wand. He finds a weakened Turbo Thunder, who reveals his origins. His homeworld Turbo World was invaded by The Darkness, which subsequently absorbed the planet after the planet's failed attempt to destroy it. He then shows that the wind wand only opens underneath a secret cave, which contains magical wands and the final part of the cave prophecy: to find the ice wand. The group returns to Fairy World with the wands to free the imprisoned fairies before everyone heads back to Earth. The fairies arrive and use their magic to remove the Earth's metal casing. Timmy heads into space with the Destructinator following him; the Destructinator attacks him, which sends him back down to the Earth, at its north polar region. After Timmy tricks the Destructinator into inhaling the explosives, he reveals that he stole the detonator remote from him back in space and uses it to obliterate him.

A polar bear—the guardian of the ice wand—raises the ice wand from beneath the ocean. Everyone urges Timmy to destroy The Darkness, but he refuses. Timmy realizes that every time The Darkness attacks, it's only out of self-defense. Timmy has fairies add an ice wand to each planet of the Solar System. Along with the white wand at Fairy World, the ice wands create a celestial smile that projects its light into The Darkness. The smile transforms it into a bright sun, The Kindness, and Timmy concludes The Darkness was only looking for a friend. The group returns to Dimmsdale, where an Eliminator, dubbed a 'Hug'inator by Cosmo, crashes in front of them and spews out everyone who had been sucked in. Everyone parties in Fairy World and celebrates the chosen one's accomplishment, though Jorgen informs Timmy that he's going to erase his friends, enemies, and family's memories of the events when the party's over. Timmy, having already figured that out, states he's just happy he doesn't have to find any more wands.

== Production ==
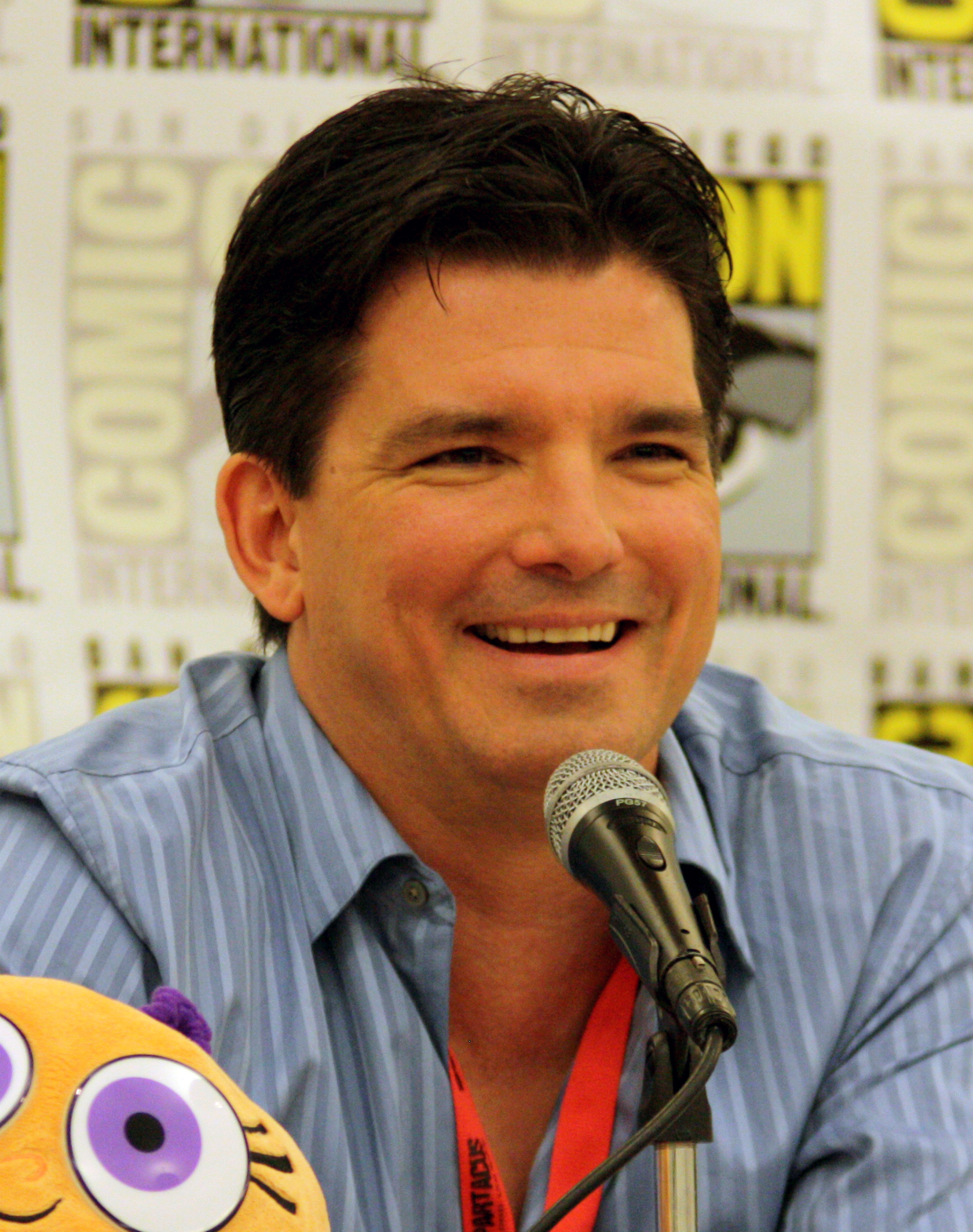
Series creator Butch Hartman wrote the trilogy with Scott Fellows and Kevin Sullivan.

Series creator and executive producer Butch Hartman wrote Wishology, along with head writer and executive producer Scott Fellows and writer Kevin Sullivan, who joined the series beginning its fifth season. Gary Conrad, who has directed several episodes of the series since its second season, served as the director for Wishology. Composer Guy Moon, who has worked on the music for The Fairly OddParents since its inception, composed the music. Like all of the previous episodes of the series, Wishology was produced in hand-drawn animation mixed with computer animation by Frederator and Billionfold Studios for Nickelodeon. The production of the trilogy required 18 months to complete, according to Toon Zone's interview with Hartman.

Initial plans were to broadcast Wishology on Nickelodeon for three consecutive Fridays starting on May 1, 2009. In the end, Nickelodeon decided to show the specials from 8:00 to 9:00 pm, Friday to Sunday, May 1–3 and was advertised as "Wishology Weekend." 2 years later, Wishology was released on DVD as a manufacture on demand Amazon exclusive, containing all three parts, on June 3, 2011.

=== Casting ===
The cast of Wishology includes all the main characters of The Fairly OddParents. Timmy Turner and Poof are voiced by Tara Strong. Cosmo, Jorgen Von Strangle, and Mr. Turner are voiced by Daran Norris. Wanda and Mrs. Turner are voiced by Susanne Blakeslee. Grey DeLisle voices Timmy's babysitter, Vicky. Dionne Quan voices Timmy's crush Trixie Tang. Jason Marsden and Gary Leroi Gray voice Timmy's friends, Chester McBadBat and A.J., respectively. Timmy's school teacher, Mr. Denzel Crocker, who has an obsession with proving that fairies are real, is voiced by Carlos Alazraqui.

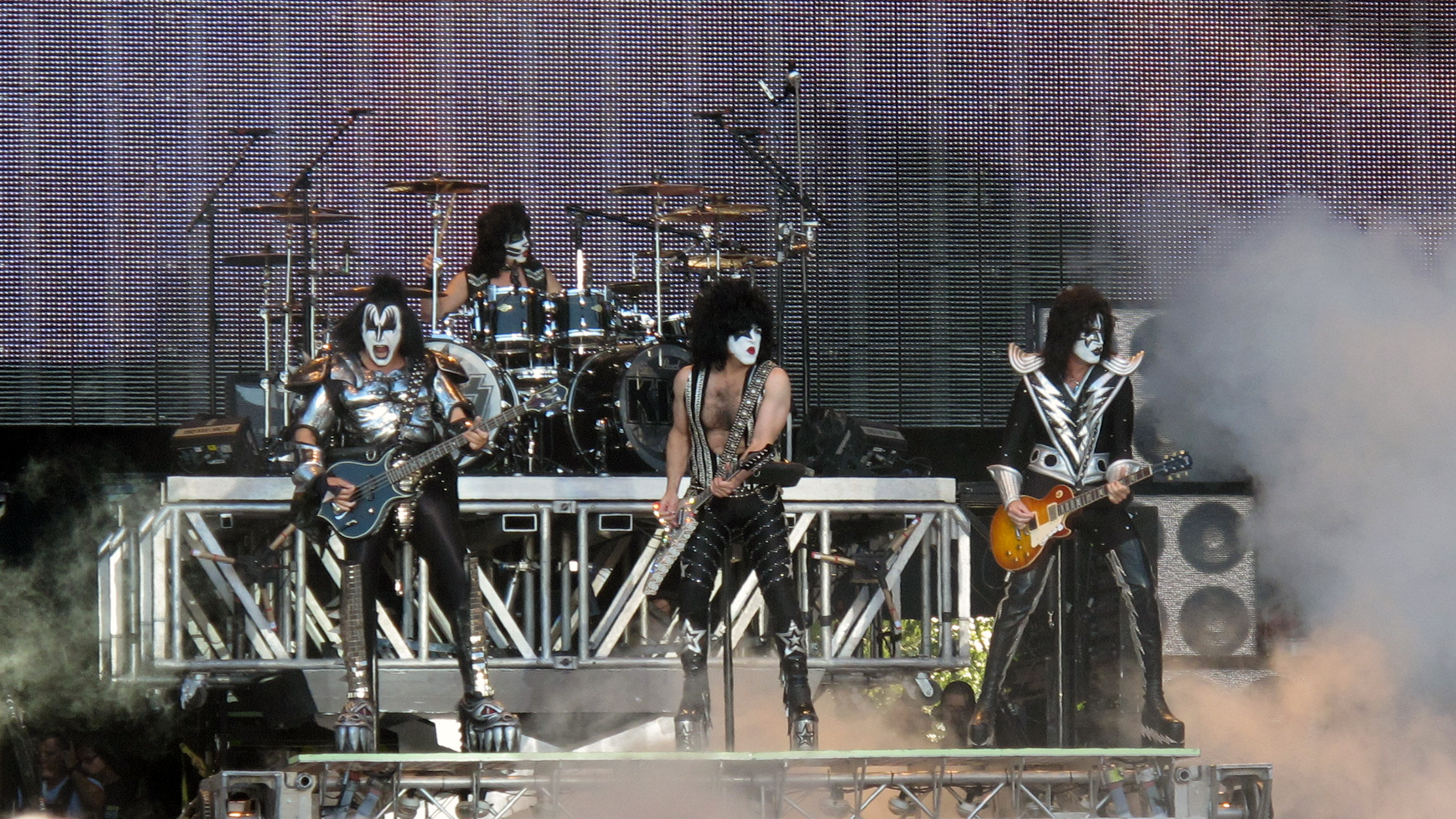
The rock band Kiss made a guest appearance in Wishology. Gene Simmons (left) and Paul Stanley (center) provided voice roles.

The rock band Kiss made a guest appearance in the trilogy. The band plays the role of the galactic guardians of the white wand in "The Big Beginning", and makes a cameo appearance in "The Final Ending". However, only two of the band's four members—Gene Simmons and Paul Stanley—provided voice roles of their Kiss personas, "The Demon" and "The Starchild", respectively. Hartman and Fellows pitched the idea of a rock band in the storyline, where the band guards the white wand that Timmy seeks. The writers originally did not intend to feature Kiss in Wishology. Rather, they initially planned to create the rock band "Smooch", with its members with heart-shaped make-up on their faces, as an allusion to the original Kiss band. Nevertheless, they asked and received permission from Gene Simmons to feature Kiss, drawn as animated two-dimensional figures to blend in with the series' customary appearance. Wishology features a performance of the Kiss song "Rock and Roll All Nite", which is played towards the end of "The Big Beginning", during a concert party at Fairy World.

In addition to the regular cast and Kiss, Wishology features other guest performances. Actor Gary Sturgis guest stars as the Lead Eliminator. Dee Bradley Baker guest stars as the trilogy's central villain, The Darkness. Actor Patrick Warburton guest stars as the M.E.R.F. agents, and Brendan Fraser guest stars as Turbo Thunder. Recurring voice actors Jim Ward, Kevin Michael Richardson, and Rob Paulsen reprise their roles as Dimmsdale news reporter Chet Ubetcha, space villain Dark Laser, and friend of Timmy Turner, Mark Chang, respectively.

== Cultural references ==
At the beginning of the first episode, Wishology includes references from three recent films: The Matrix, The Lord of the Rings, and Harry Potter. During the scene in "The Big Beginning", which features a reference to Back to the Future where Timmy Turner and Jorgen Von Strangle in the fairy motorcycle on a chase with the Eliminators. Throughout Timmy's travel in space with Mark and Timmy's enemies in "The Exciting Middle Part" and during the beginning of "The Final Ending", Wishology focuses its media references on George Lucas' film series Star Wars. Wishology contains a number of other cultural references. Towards the end of Timmy's rock solo performance at the M.A.R.F., Gene Simmons notes Timmy's long tongue when Timmy licks the guitar, a tribute to Simmons' own long tongue.

== Reception ==
According to Nielsen ratings, Wishology received 4.012 million viewers for "The Big Beginning", about 3.6 million viewers for "The Exciting Middle Part", and 4.071 million viewers for its last night, "The Final Ending". "The Final Ending" and "The Big Beginning" ranked twelfth and thirteenth overall, respectively, on the list of top twenty television shows on the cable network for the week ending May 3, 2009. The Fairly OddParents became the highest-rated cable network series that Friday for "The Big Beginning". However, "The Exciting Middle Part" was topped by the teen sitcom and drama series Jonas, which premiered simultaneously on the Disney Channel. "The Final Ending" ranked in third place for Sunday night. The trilogy's ratings were highest for The Fairly OddParents since its preceding special. Fairly OddBaby, which attained 8.809 million viewers during its premiere and ranked the highest in the top 20 cable network shows for the week ending February 24, 2008. Wishology remains the second-highest rated special in terms of viewership numbers since the premiere of the following special, A Fairly Odd Movie: Grow Up, Timmy Turner!, a live-action adaptation television film of the same series, which attracted 5.8 million viewers in its original airing on July 9, 2011. Composer Guy Moon won an Annie Award for his music in "The Big Beginning" in the "Individual Achievement Category" of "Music in a Television Production" on February 6, 2010.

Wishology received mixed reception from critics. Eileen Cruz of Toon Zone mainly praised it. Specifically, she observes that it "manages to remain largely fresh the entire time for an animated comedy episode over two hours long". Aaron Bynum of The Animation Insider, however, gave a more negative review. He suggested it was only "moderately entertaining", saying it is "just another over-exerted animated epic of an over-extended property." Cruz commented positively on the show's usage of a mix of standard and computer animation; however, she noted the blend between special 3D objects and their surroundings was "not perfect", though "not distracting either". Bynum stated the animated trilogy's usage of computer animation was "rather needless", and its cultural parodies were "tired and forgettable". While he finds "The Final Ending" interesting enough to keep the viewer engaged, he also criticized the series as a whole. He said, "it would appear that the cartoon is no longer an exclusive journey into one child's ever-changing imagination; now, it's just a fanciful what-if". Cruz praised the role of the band Kiss. She cannot think of too many other bands that "could exist in such a universe with such an exaggerated reality". However, she criticized the voice portrayal of Turbo Thunder, finding it to be "entirely unattractive" and "off-putting," and thus "it simply didn't work for me." Bynum, however, had a more positive reaction to the character. He noted Turbo Thunder was "hilariously pretentious and self-serving", and he "ultimately makes the second chapter ["The Exciting Middle Part"] a whole lot better by acting as a frenemy with similar goals."
