= The Garden (animated series) =

- Genre: Christian; Preschool
- Created by: Butch Hartman
- Directed by: Butch Hartman
- Voices of: Cristina M. Medina; James Arnold Taylor
- Theme music composer: Moon People Soundtracks
- Opening theme: "In The Garden"
- No. of seasons: 2

Production
- Producers: Butch Hartman; Julieann Hartman

Original release
- Network: Pure Flix; Apple TV; Angel
- Release: January 1, 2023 – present

The Garden (Also known as The Garden Cartoon) is an American Christian children's musical animated web series created in 2019 by Butch Hartman, who co-produced it with his wife Julieann. Released on January 1, 2023 on PureFlix, the series centers around a duo of anthropomorphic animals composed of a lion named Lenny and a lamb named Lucy, who do a variety of daily tasks and receive advice from the Boss, a disembodied voice that is represented as a rainbow.

== Cast and characters ==
- Cristina M. Medina as Lucy the Lamb, Joy, Clarice, Benny, Queen Bee, Ellie
- James Arnold Taylor as Lenny the Lion, Randy, Batmane, Porcupine
- Brian Stivale as The Boss, Captain Snappy
- Katie Leigh as Grace
- Butch Hartman as Delivery Man, Mr. Toothacher, Cuckoo Charlie, Various Animals
- Danny Gokey as Blake Drake
- Raul Meza as Troops, Gallery of Bees (Note: www.imdb.com https://www.imdb.com/title/tt25700570/fullcredits.)
- Jessica Weyman as Mitzi

== Episodes ==
Episode List 1. Truth is the Mane Thing / Where Your Treasure Is

TV-Y • 21 min • May 1, 2024

2. Humble Bee / Cloud Nine

TV-Y • 22 min • May 1, 2024

3. Prehistoric Papa / Finding Joy

TV-Y • 21 min • May 1, 2024

4. Banana Burgers / Stake Out, Fake Out

TV-Y • 21 min • May 1, 2024

5. The Wanderer / Spots and Stripes

TV-Y • 24 min • May 1, 2024

6. Rocket Riter / Lots of Lennys

TV-Y • 24 min • May 1, 2024

7. Double Trouble / Fish and Ship

TV-Y • 22 min • May 1, 2024

8. Amazing Space / Brush with Fame

TV-Y • 25 min • May 1, 2024

9. Shear Happiness / Party of One

TV-Y • 24 min • May 1, 2024

10. Seeds of Love / Three's a Crowd

TV-Y • 24 min • May 1, 2024

== Production and release ==
After creating The Garden in 2019, Hartman planned to produce at least two seasons, launch a subscription-based app for the series in late 2022, create a VBS curriculum for churches, and illustrate a children's Bible published by Thomas Nelson titled The Garden Children's Bible, which was released in 2023. The series premiered on Pure Flix on January 1, 2023. Season 1 has since aired on The Garden Cartoon App, Prime Video, Apple TV, Angel, Google Play, and other streamers.

Season 2 premiered exclusively on Angel with weekly episodes starting March 25, 2026.

== Films ==
The first compilation film adaptation of The Garden, A Garden Cartoon Movie: The Greatest Thing Ever!, had a home release in July 2025. Angel Studios partnered with Butch Hartman to produce The Christmas King! A Garden Cartoon Movie, which was released later that year.

== Reception ==
=== Critical reception ===
Jose Solís of Common Sense Media said, "It's hard to resist an animated film that truly wants to entertain without talking down to its audience. In A Garden Cartoon Movie: The Greatest Thing Ever!, the filmmakers strike a smart balance between catchy songs, quirky humor, and simple life lessons."

=== Awards and nominations ===
Year	Award	Category	Nominee(s)	Result	Ref.
2023	Voice Arts Awards	Outstanding Animation Character - Film or TV - Best Voiceover	Cristina M. Medina as Lucy	Nominated	
2025	Faith in Film Festival	Best Animation	The Garden Cartoon, "Shear Happiness"	Nominated	
2026	International Christian Film & Music Festival	Best Animated Film	The Garden Cartoon	Nominated	
2026	International Christian Film & Music Festival	Best Animated Film	The Greatest Thing Ever! A Garden Cartoon Movie	Nominated	
