= The Fairly OddParents season 6 =

The Fairly OddParents
- Season 6
- DVD cover
- Showrunner: Butch Hartman
- No. of episodes: 20 (30 segments)

Release
- Original network: Nickelodeon
- Original release: February 18, 2008 – August 12, 2009

Season chronology
- ← Previous; Season 5 Next → Season 7

After a year-long hiatus in 2007, The Fairly OddParents returned for a sixth season of 20 episodes, which aired from February 18, 2008, to August 12, 2009. The season had one movie, Fairly OddBaby. It is the first season not to be distributed by Nelvana or air on Jetix or any Disney channels.

== Episodes ==
No. overall	No. in season	Title	Directed by	Written by	Storyboard by	Original release date	Prod. code	US viewers (millions)
81	1	"Fairly OddBaby"	Ken Bruce, Michelle Bryan & Gary Conrad	Scott Fellows, Butch Hartman & Kevin Sullivan	Wincat Alcala, Aaron Hammersley, Butch Hartman & Marty Warner	February 18, 2008	FOP−263 FOP−264	8.81
82	2	"Fairly OddBaby"	Ken Bruce, Michelle Bryan & Gary Conrad	Scott Fellows, Butch Hartman & Kevin Sullivan	Wincat Alcala, Aaron Hammersley, Butch Hartman & Marty Warner	February 18, 2008	FOP−265 FOP−266	8.81
Poof comes into existence when Cosmo and Wanda decide to have a child of their own, and Timmy wishes it so. However, because the fairy baby's magic is developing and uncontrollable, villains called the anti-fairies (polar opposite of fairies) and pixies (business fairies) seek to steal the fairy baby so they can take over the fairies' home, Fairy World and the Universe. Guest stars: Ben Stein as H.P. and Sanderson and Mary Hart as Fairy Hart
83	3	"Mission: Responsible"	Michelle Bryan	Scott Fellows	Butch Hartman	March 10, 2008	FOP−268	3.70
83	3	"Hairicane"	Ken Bruce	Kevin Sullivan	Brandon Kruse	March 11, 2008	FOP−267	N/A
Cosmo and Wanda are very tired from taking care of Poof, so Timmy volunteers to take over and give them a night on the town. However, the minute they poof away, Timmy loses Poof and must find him before they return. Timmy wishes for an indestructible luscious hairstyle so his dad does not give him any more haircuts. Meanwhile, Wanda brings Poof to the barber, Dr. Rip Studwell for a haircut, but Poof is much too resistant to the barber.
84	4	"Open Wide and Say Aaagh!"	Gary Conrad	Butch Hartman	Wincat Alcala	March 12, 2008	FOP−269	N/A
84	4	"Odd Pirates"	Michelle Bryan	Kevin Sullivan	Butch Hartman & Marty Warner	March 13, 2008	FOP−270	N/A
Timmy needs to go to the hospital to have his tonsils removed, because he has tonsillitis. Unfortunately, his candy striper nurse is his babysitter Vicky, who is determined to make his stay in the hospital as painful as possible. Timmy wishes to go to the Dimmsdale Pirates baseball game, but Poof accidentally wishes Timmy, Cosmo, Wanda, and himself on a real Pirate ship, and the parrot on Dirtybeard steals the stars on Cosmo and Wanda's wands.
85	5	"The Fairly Oddlympics"	Ken Bruce & Gary Conrad	Scott Fellows, Butch Hartman & Kevin Sullivan	Aaron Hammersley & Butch Hartman	August 1, 2008	FOP−271	N/A
85	5	"The Fairly Oddlympics"	Ken Bruce & Gary Conrad	Scott Fellows, Butch Hartman & Kevin Sullivan	Aaron Hammersley & Butch Hartman	August 1, 2008	FOP−272	N/A
Timmy, who is tired of being the "guinea pig" of the Fairies, Pixies, and Anti-Fairies, wishes for a competition to see which one of them is the best magical creature. Jorgen does not let any fairy compete, however, because he is the strongest. When he wins the first five medals, Anti-Cosmo and HP knock out Jorgen. Timmy becomes the fairies' trainer and makes a bet: if Anti-Cosmo wins, Timmy will be his godchild; if HP wins, Timmy will work for him forever; and if Timmy wins, he will force HP and Anti-Cosmo to do something very bad. The fairies win, and Timmy says "nothing" for what Anti-Cosmo and HP do. Timmy says he learned that cheaters only cheat against themselves. It turns out to be a dream for Scott Hamilton (who was previously co-hosting the games with Timmy), because when he says what Timmy said, Juandissimo and Cupid give him a cheetah (a running gag involves that when anyone says cheater on the field or somewhere else other than the stands, Cupid gives them a cheetah). Guest stars: Scott Hamilton as himself and Ben Stein as H.P. and Sanderson
86	6	"Odd Squad"	Michelle Bryan	Scott Fellows	Brandon Kruse	May 12, 2008	FOP−273	N/A
86	6	"For Emergencies Only"	Ken Bruce	Butch Hartman	Wincat Alcala	May 12, 2008	FOP−274	N/A
After watching his favorite adventure−mystery TV show, "C.C. Cruiser and the Hot Rod Squad", Timmy wishes his life was exactly like the main character's, along with a female assistant and talking car. Wanda becomes his assistant and Cosmo becomes a talking, green car named Carsmo. The place that they go to seek adventure is Fairy World, where they discover that Mama Cosma is missing. However, there is a note there that reads: BRIDGE 7:00 pm. They then go to the bridge, but no one is there. Juandissimo Magnifico appears and tells them that Mama Cosma was at one of the restaurants. They go there, only to find that she is not there. Jorgen Von Strangle appears and tells Timmy and his fairies that Mama Cosma was at her house playing bridge with him, but then his teddy bear goes missing, and they must go search for it. The episode ends with all five on a freeze frame. Feeling that Cosmo and Wanda are neglecting him for Poof, Timmy convinces his godparents to give him his own magic wand with ten wishes on it for emergencies, but he uses them unwisely.
87	7	"Cheese & Crockers"	Michelle Bryan	Scott Fellows	Butch Hartman	May 14, 2008	FOP−276	N/A
87	7	"Land Before Timmy"	Gary Conrad	Story by : Tom Krajewski; Teleplay by : Kevin Sullivan	Rayfield Angrum & Butch Hartman	May 15, 2008	FOP−275	N/A
To celebrate half day (which resulted from his parents idiotically mistaking him getting home early from school because it was only a half of a school day as an actual holiday), Timmy wishes for a machine that allows things to merge with other items to become half-human and half-object. When Crocker gets a hold of it, he accidentally merges himself with cheese, and he uses this power to capture Timmy's fairies. When Timmy wishes for a simpler world, everyone is transported to prehistoric times, and when volcanoes hit prehistorical Dimmsdale (Dimmsrock), Timmy has to find a way to power Cosmo and Wanda's wands before the city burns down, since the town is built under four volcanoes.
88	8	"Merry Wishmas"	Ken Bruce	Butch Hartman, Scott Fellows & Kevin Sullivan	Aaron Hammersley, Butch Hartman & Brandon Kruse	December 12, 2008 (Note: This episode was first released in A Very Merry Nickmas iTunes on July 10, 2008.)	FOP−277	N/A
88	8	"Merry Wishmas"	Ken Bruce	Butch Hartman, Scott Fellows & Kevin Sullivan	Aaron Hammersley, Butch Hartman & Brandon Kruse	December 12, 2008	FOP−278	N/A
After no one in Dimmsdale gets what they want for Christmas, Timmy wishes that Cosmo, Wanda and Poof could give everyone a wish in the mail. Things go wrong when greedy Vicky wishes for a million wishes causing her mailbox to explode, and everyone catches the falling wishes, thus causing the Big Wand to overload and for Jorgen to shut off the fairy's magic power. However, Jorgen actually likes Wishmas, believing Santa to be stealing fairy magic and not giving any credit, and begins promoting Wishmas. Soon, Christmas is replaced with Wishmas and unemployed Santa moves in with the Turners. Timmy now must get rid of "Jorgen the Magic Mailman," and get Christmas and Santa back.
89	9	"King Chang"	Michelle Bryan	Kevin Sullivan	Wincat Alcala	May 16, 2008	FOP−279	N/A
89	9	"The End of the Universe-ity"	Ken Bruce	Scott Fellows	Butch Hartman & Rayfield Angrum	August 11, 2008	FOP−280	N/A
When Mark Chang celebrates his one-year anniversary on Earth, they go back to Yugopatamia and Mandie marries him and became queen while Mark's dad turns into Timmy and goes to Earth. Later, Mandie becomes a dictator, so Timmy and Mark must stop her before she destroys the Earth. Also, Timmy's Dad locked Timmy up in a cage made of wood because of what Mark's dad did as Timmy. Dark Laser tricks Timmy's parents into thinking that he is sending Timmy to a university where they will pay for his college fund. However, they do not know that the university is actually Dark Laser's ship. After approval of Timmy going to Dark Laser's university by his parents, Timmy is forced to wear a Dark Laser-type suit, which eventually takes over his mind and makes him knock out Crocker and Francis against some lockers; getting Trixie to fall in love with him; making Vicky do what he wants her to do, and other tasks. Cosmo tries to convince Timmy not to do this by telling him that fairies can make people naked. Timmy then graduates and Dark Laser forces him to blow up the earth, but Timmy deliberately decides not to. After refusing, Dark Laser does it himself, but Timmy wishes that the laser would backfire, causing the laser to destroy the spaceship. Timmy wishes he was back home, and when he gets back, he hears the explosion of the spaceship, meaning that Dark Laser survived in it. Timmy then decides to keep the suit for emergencies.
90	10	"Sooper Poof"	Gary Conrad	Laurie Israel & Rachel Ruderman	Aaron Hammersley	August 12, 2008	FOP−281	N/A
90	10	"Wishing Well"	Michelle Bryan	Kevin Sullivan	Butch Hartman	August 13, 2008	FOP−282	N/A
Poof, while practicing his shape-shifting power, blows up the house, and Mom and Dad find him thinking he is a super alien baby. They want to take care of him and turn him into a super hero. Timmy now has to retrieve Poof for Cosmo and Wanda before Dad's attempts to turn Poof into a superhero get everyone into trouble. After Timmy wears Cosmo and Wanda out, Jorgen takes Timmy to an academy to learn to be more independent and wish less along with two other children, but they attempt to escape. Guest star: Charlie Schlatter as Dwight and Irving
91	11	"Wishy Washy"	Ken Bruce	Butch Hartman	Brandon Kruse	August 14, 2008	FOP−283	N/A
91	11	"Poof's Playdate"	Gary Conrad	Scott Fellows	Butch Hartman	August 14, 2008	FOP−284	N/A
Timmy wishes for a super car wash that rejuvenates everything that goes through it in order to repair for Dad's Stiker Z sports car. It works, but when dinosaur fossils and cavemen go through it, Dimmsdale is in prehistoric chaos, and when Cosmo and Wanda go through it, they turn into rebellious teens, causing Poof to disappear as they never married or had him. Fortunately, Timmy manages to convince them to become normal again, and they save him from being eaten by a dinosaur and turn everything else normal. Poof falls to the charm of a TV show called, "Lookee Lookee's Lunchbox", and Wanda tells Cosmo and Timmy to get Poof's eyes off the TV for a while. However, they put stuffed toys that look like them in front of the TV while they play a game, so Poof can have something to do. While he and Cosmo play, Timmy gets Jorgen, the Tooth Fairy, Juandissimo, and Cupid to come to his house so they can have a "pancake party", but instead of a pancake party, Timmy wishes they were babies so Poof can play with them. This goes well until Timmy pulls them in a wagon. This makes Cosmo join in the fun by turning himself and Wanda into babies. Meanwhile, Timmy's parents want to be good ones, so they decide to have a playdate with Timmy. The babies escape, but Timmy manages to get them back up to the TV, and he tries to figure out how to change them back. He then sees that they do whatever the TV show tells them to do, so using the Cosmo doll, he tells Cosmo to turn back into an adult and to turn everyone else back into an adult. This works, but Poof still wants Jorgen's pacifier. He grows muscles, beats up Jorgen, and takes the pacifier.
92	12	"Vicky Gets Fired"	Ken Bruce	Kevin Sullivan	Aaron Hammersley	November 30, 2008 (Note: This episode was first released in Canada on November 13, 2008.)	FOP−286	N/A
92	12	"Chindred Spirits"	Michelle Bryan	Amy Keating Rogers	Butch Hartman & Rayfield Angrum	November 30, 2008	FOP−285	N/A
After Vicky is fired for erasing a videotape that the Turners were saving so then they could use it to get their own reality show, she is forced to take over Dimmsdale and wage war on Earth. Timmy must now stop her at all costs. Unfortunately, every time Timmy wishes she was not the ruler of something, she once again becomes a ruler of an extremely powerful position (Mayor of Dimmsdale, President, finally Supreme Ruler of Everything That Breathes) and destroys the world anyway. In order to stop her, Timmy must boldly wish she was his baby-sitter again. After reading a boring issue of the Crimson Chin comics, Timmy, Cosmo, Wanda, and Poof venture into Chincinnati and realize the Chin wants a girlfriend. Timmy wishes up a match, but the Chin and Golden Locks seem to be going on dates rather than fighting crime, so when the Chin prepares to ask Goldie for their marriage, Timmy promptly wishes she went evil, but the Chin's love, now the Hair Razor, is more powerful than him, eventually leading to his surrender. Timmy must now attempt to reverse the situation, which leads to his fall down a tall building to "unlock" Golden Locks' heart from evil. Guest star: Jay Leno as The Crimson Chin
93	13	"9 Lives!"	Ken Bruce	Chris Prouty	Wincat Alcala	November 30, 2008 (Note: This episode was first released in Canada on November 14, 2008.)	FOP−289	N/A
93	13	"Dread 'n' Breakfast"	Gary Conrad	Scott Fellows	Butch Hartman	November 30, 2008	FOP−287	N/A
Timmy tries to find a safer job for Catman (a.k.a. Adam West) after constant injury, but each job leads to someone or something getting attacked. Guest star: Adam West as Catman When Timmy's dad quits his job to become a sock monkey salesman (which fails horribly because no one wants to buy one because "they don't do anything") the Turners turn their house into a bread and breakfast to avoid bankruptcy. Unfortunately, their first guests are Mr. Crocker, Dark Laser, and Tootie. Timmy cannot make any wishes, because if he does, Crocker's Magic Sensors will track the magic back to his fairies and capture them.
94	14	"Birthday Bashed!"	Michelle Bryan	Butch Hartman	Brandon Kruse	July 9, 2009 (Note: This episode was first released in Canada on May 18, 2008.)	FOP−288	N/A
94	14	"Momnipresent"	Gary Conrad	Kevin Sullivan	Rayfield Angrum & Butch Hartman	August 12, 2009	FOP−290	N/A
Timmy looks forward to his birthday until Jorgen reminds him that each birthday draws him a year closer to losing his fairies; however, Timmy is not worried because his parents always forget his birthday, but he then panics when they seem to remember it this year. Guest star: Chris Kirkpatrick as Chip Skylark and Adam West as himself. Timmy's preparations for the party of the year are interrupted by his mother, who wants to spend some quality time with him. He then sneaks away every chance he gets to get the party ready.
95	15	"Wishology! The Big Beginning"	Butch Hartman; Gary Conrad (uncredited)	Scott Fellows, Butch Hartman & Kevin Sullivan	Wincat Alcala, Aaron Hammersley, Butch Hartman & Brandon Kruse	May 1, 2009	FOP−291 FOP−292	4.01
96	16	"Wishology! The Big Beginning"	Butch Hartman; Gary Conrad (uncredited)	Scott Fellows, Butch Hartman & Kevin Sullivan	Wincat Alcala, Aaron Hammersley, Butch Hartman & Brandon Kruse	May 1, 2009	FOP−293 FOP−294	4.01
After a strange morning where his fairies disappear and no one at home or school remembers him, Timmy is thrust into an age-old prophecy that contains an enemy called The Darkness, and the Chosen One, who happens to be Timmy himself. Timmy finds himself traveling to Las Vegas to secure an ancient 'White Wand' after solving an ancient riddle, but he must keep ahead of The Darkness' agents, The Eliminators, as well as MERF, an extra-terrestrial secret organization that has labeled Timmy for arrest. Meanwhile, Mom, Dad, and Crocker drive to Middle Aged Rock Festival (M.A.R.F.) to prove they are still young, but constantly stop for bathroom breaks. Guest stars: Patrick Warburton as M.E.R.F. Agents, Charlie Schlatter as Kid #1 and Security Guard, Gene Simmons as himself, Paul Stanley as himself, and Brendan Fraser as Turbo Thunder
97	17	"Wishology! The Exciting Middle Part"	Butch Hartman	Scott Fellows, Butch Hartman & Kevin Sullivan	Wincat Alcala, Aaron Hammersley, Butch Hartman & Brandon Kruse	May 2, 2009	FOP−295 FOP−296	3.68
98	18	"Wishology! The Exciting Middle Part"	Butch Hartman	Scott Fellows, Butch Hartman & Kevin Sullivan	Wincat Alcala, Aaron Hammersley, Butch Hartman & Brandon Kruse	May 2, 2009	FOP−297 FOP−298	3.68
After beating The Darkness in "The Big Beginning", Timmy has relaxed into celebrity status on Fairy World. Turbo Thunder has become a laughing stock and a beggar after proclaiming the Darkness will come back, and Jorgen finally banishes him. Wanda, concerned that Timmy needs to get back to Dimmsdale and be normal again, poofs him back home. Meanwhile, on Yugopotamia, the Eliminators invade and steal the Yugopotamians' Fake-i-fiers, which allow them to change shape. Mark Chang, the Prince, is the only one who escapes, and heads to Earth to seek help from Timmy. Timmy, back on Earth, learns of The Darkness' return after an Eliminator disguised as Mark tries to capture him. Timmy and the gang return to the Cave of Destiny on Fairy World, where Timmy learns of a second wand located on a Blue Moon, but before he can try to make sense of anything, the Eliminators capture Jorgen, Cosmo, Wanda, and Poof, while Timmy and Mark escape through a portal back to Timmy's room. The Eliminators also round up Chester, A.J., Trixie, Mom, and Dad, and disguise themselves to capture Timmy. Timmy's normal friends and family meet his fairies and devise an escape plan using Poof's movie ninja skills. Back on Earth, Timmy and Mark recruit his enemies Crocker, Vicky, and Dark Laser to assist him. The five go to a space cantina on their way to the Blue Moon in the Vegan system. While Crocker, Vicky, and Dark Laser are caught by Eliminators disguised as patrons, Timmy and Mark are saved by Turbo Thunder, who merely uses them for information and discards them. Timmy's friends and fairies rescue his enemies and poof to the Blue Moon of Vegan just in time to save him from the Eliminators. Timmy locates the Wind Wand, but it fails to do anything. The Darkness arrives and Timmy's army is almost sucked in, forming a long chain with Jorgen at the end to save themselves. Timmy realizes The Darkness only wants him, and he decides to sacrifice himself to save the others, leaving them to mourn. Guest stars: Charlie Schlatter as Fairy Geek #1, Announcer and Shimmer, John Goodman as The Guardian, and Brendan Fraser as Turbo Thunder
99	19	"Wishology! The Final Ending"	Butch Hartman	Scott Fellows, Butch Hartman & Kevin Sullivan	Aaron Hammersley, Butch Hartman & Brandon Kruse	May 3, 2009	FOP−299 FOP−300	4.07
100	20	"Wishology! The Final Ending"	Butch Hartman	Scott Fellows, Butch Hartman & Kevin Sullivan	Aaron Hammersley, Butch Hartman & Brandon Kruse	May 3, 2009	FOP−301 FOP−302	4.07
Confident and secure, Timmy feels great after defeating The Darkness as his world turns into a paradise for him; however, he soon discovers that it is all an illusion and that he did not win, but is now living inside The Darkness. Now, his family, his friends, and even his enemies on the outside must rescue him and help him find the third and final wand in order to defeat The Darkness once and for all. Guest stars: Patrick Warburton as M.E.R.F. Agents and Brendan Fraser as Turbo Thunder

== DVD releases ==
Season	Episodes	Release dates	
Season	Episodes	Region 1	Region 2
6	12	Season 6 Volume 1: November 18, 2008; Episodes: 81-82 ("Fairly OddBaby") – 87 ("Cheese & Crockers" / "Land Before Timmy"), 89 ("King Chang" / "The End of the Universe-ity") - 90 ("Wishy Washy" / "Poof's Playdate") Season 6: April 3, 2014; Episodes: 81-82 ("Fairly Odd Baby") – 94 ("Birthday Bashed") / ("Momnipresent) Wishology; Episodes: 95-100 (Wishology) The Complete Series: December 10, 2024; Episodes: Entire Season (and Wisholgy trilogy) included	Season 6 Volume 1 (Poundland Exclusive): June 2013; Episodes: 81-82 ("Fairly Odd Baby") and 83a ("Mission Responsible") Season 6 Volume 2 (Poundland Exclusive): June 2013; Episodes: 83b ("Hairicane"), 84 ("Open Wide and Say Aaagh!" / "Odd Pirates"), and 85 ("The Fairly Oddlympics")
