= Floating timeline =

Fictional storytelling device

A floating timeline (also known as a sliding timescale) is a device used in fiction, particularly in long-running comics and animation, in which characters age little or not at all while the setting around them remains contemporary to the real world. The term is used in the comics community to refer to series that take place in a "continuous present". Floating timelines are also used when creators do not need or want their characters to age, typically in children's books and animated television shows.

== Definition ==
When certain stories in comics, especially origin stories, are rewritten, they often retain key events which are updated to a contemporary time. Floating timelines are used as a plot device to "explain or explain away inconsistencies in the way that events and characters exist within a world".

According to Roz Kaveney, a floating timeline is used in comics because of "the commercial need to keep certain characters going forever". Academic Kevin Wanner has compared superheroes in comics to mythological figures, and writes that the use of a sliding timescale in comics is similar to the way ageless figures in myths are depicted interacting with the contemporary world of the storyteller.

== Examples ==
=== Animation ===
Animated media often uses floating timelines. The long-running animated television series The Simpsons uses a floating timeline; episodes showing the early lives of Marge and Homer have been set in both the 1970s and the 1990s, and the characters do not age despite society and technology changing around them.

In the South Park season 3 episode "The Red Badge of Gayness", Bill Clinton is the US president both in real life and in-universe, and the boys are in 3rd grade. By season 27, Donald Trump is president, both in-universe and in real life, but the boys have only advanced to fourth grade.

In the Japanese anime series Pokémon, none of the characters have aged since the series began in the 1990s. Chief director Kunihiko Yuyama has said that main protagonist Ash Ketchum is eternally ten years old, and that time has not passed since the beginning of his journey.

The Nickelodeon television series The Fairly OddParents subverts the concept of a floating timeline in the episode "Timmy's Secret Wish!", where it is revealed that the protagonist had wished for everyone on Earth to stop aging and that 50 years has passed in the show's timeline.

=== Comics ===
The Archie comics feature characters who do not age, despite references to various time periods over the course of the series. Similarly, Hergé's Tintin comics take place from the 1920s to the 1970s, while Tintin and the other characters do not age.

Many long-established comic characters exist in a floating timeline. In the Marvel Universe, certain events drift through time to remain about 15 years before the "floating present". For example, the origin story of Iron Man always takes place in a war. Initially this was shown as the early stages of American involvement in the Vietnam War contemporary to the first publication of the character in 1962, but in newer stories the specific war is updated. Although Batman first appeared in 1939, his stories are often updated to contemporary (or sometimes historical or futuristic) time periods. Various incarnations of his sidekick Robin tend to stay young for a long period before rapidly aging into adulthood, with a new character then taking on the Robin persona, a common trend in the superhero genre. However, comic characters' ages and backstories often change depending on the author writing the story. Some characters, especially ones with magical or extraterrestrial origins, avoid the floating timeline trope by aging while appearing young.

A noteworthy exception to the floating timeline trope is the comic strip Luann, where characters age approximately one month for every real-world year.

Another famous exception is the long-running character Judge Dredd of the British weekly anthology comic 2000 AD. Time passes in the Judge Dredd strip in real time, so as a year passes in life, a year passes in the comic.

=== Novels ===
Author P. G. Wodehouse set his comedic Jeeves series, about English gentleman Bertie Wooster and his valet, when they were written, though the characters age little or not at all. This allowed for humorous references to contemporary popular culture in the stories, which were published between 1915 and 1974.

Antonia Forest's Marlow series is about an English family who are children during World War II, yet are still teenagers in the later books set in the 1970s.

In the Alex Rider series, published from 2000 to 2023, the protagonist goes from using a Game Boy to experiencing virtual reality in just a year of his life, remaining 14 to 15 years old throughout the series. Author Anthony Horowitz has said that he didn't want to "lose the innocence of the character", and that it was important for Alex to remain young because the plots required him to play the part of an unassuming child spy.

Rex Stout used a floating timeline for his novels and short stories featuring detective Nero Wolfe. Stout stated "I didn't age the characters because I didn't want to. That would have ... centered attention on the characters rather than the stories".

In The Mysterious Affair at Styles, Agatha Christie's detective Hercule Poirot was depicted as a Belgian refugee during the First World War, and imagined as already elderly by Christie in 1920. Christie went on writing Poirot novels until 1975, but only in Curtain: Poirot's Last Case does old age finally catch up with him.

In Casino Royale, published in 1953, James Bond is said to have taken up espionage after the Second World War. Bond would go on through the decades of the Cold War and beyond without aging.

In Janet Evanovich's Stephanie Plum novels, the character remains perpetually 30 years old, while the world around her progresses from the 1990s to the 2020s.

== See also ==
- Soap opera rapid aging syndrome
