= Light On (disambiguation) =

"Light On" is a 2008 song by American Idol winner David Cook.

Light On may also refer to:

- "Light On" (Rebecca Ferguson song), a 2013 single
- Light On (album), a 2007 jazz album by Tom Harrell
- "Light On" (Maggie Rogers song), 2018 single from the album Heard It in a Past Life

== See also ==
- Lights On (disambiguation)
