= Silverline =

American contemporary Christian music band

- Origin: Brainerd, Minnesota United States
- Genres: Contemporary Christian, Christian rock, pop rock
- Years active: 2006–2015
- Labels: Dream, VSR Music Group, Vertical Shift
- Members: Ryan Edberg; Stephen Adams; Nathan Langert; C.C. Starnes
- Past members: Matt Adams; Dean Goossen; Isaac Nelson; Andrew Raboin; Luke Torg
- Website: www.silverlinemusic.com

Silverline was an American contemporary Christian music band from Brainerd, Minnesota. They were on the Dream Records label and broke up in 2015.

== Background ==
Silverline is from Brainerd, Minnesota, and formed in 2006.

== Music ==
=== EPs ===
The band released two independent EPs called Silverline in 2007 and EP in 2008, and they released two with VSR Music Group. The first was called "Start to Believe" and produced their breakout single "Get It Right". The second EP, titled "Voices in the Night", was even more successful and charted at No. 73 on the Christian & Gospel Albums chart by Billboard. From the EP Voices in the Night, the band had two songs chart on the Christian Rock charts, which were "Broken Glass" and "Shine a Light", which charted at No. 1.

=== Lights Out ===
Their first full-length studio album was released on April 9, 2013. Lights Out, which was with Dream Records, and was produced by Ben Kasica charted at No. 34 on the Christian & Gospel Albums Chart and at No. 13 on the Top Heatseekers chart. The first single from the album "Lights Out" has charted at No. 1 on the Christian rock songs chart, for two consecutive weeks on April 20 and 27, 2013.

== Discography ==
=== Album ===
Year	Album	Peak chart positions	
Year	Album	Top Christian and Gospel	Top Heatseekers
2013	Lights Out: Released: April 9, 2013; Label: Dream; Format: CD, Digital download	34	13

=== EPs ===
Year	Album	Peak chart positions
Year	Album	Top Christian and Gospel
2009	Start to Believe: Released: 2009; Label: VSR; Format: CD, Digital download	—
2010	Voices in the Night: Released: June 29, 2010; Label: VSR; Format: CD, Digital download	73

=== Singles ===
Year	Title	Chart peaks	Album
Year	Title	US Christian Rock	Album
2009	"Get it Right"	20	Start to Believe EP
2009	"Stop Me Now"	19	Start to Believe EP
2010-11	"Voices in the Night"	3	Voices in the Night EP
2010-11	"Broken Glass"	1	Voices in the Night EP
2010-11	"Shine a Light"	1	Voices in the Night EP
2013	"Lights Out"	1	Lights Out
