= Lights Out (book) =

2020 book about General Electric

- Author: Thomas Gryta; Ted Mann
- Genre: Business and economics
- Publisher: Mariner Books
- Publication date: July 2020
- Pages: 368
- ISBN: 0358250412

Lights Out: Pride, Delusion, and the Fall of General Electric is a 2020 book written by Wall Street Journal reporters Thomas Gryta and Ted Mann. It documents the downfall of the American conglomerate General Electric, largely attributing it to the decisions of CEO Jeff Immelt. The book ends with Larry Culp becoming CEO in 2018.

== Contents ==
Lights Out covers the recent history of the American conglomerate General Electric starting from when it was run by Jack Welch in the 1980s, and ending with Larry Culp becoming CEO in 2018, the first outsider to do so in the company's history. The book covers the company's decline, largely attributing it to former CEO Jeff Immelt's failure to fix major problems within the company, and his accounting practices that made it appear to outsiders that the company was doing better than it really was. An example of this was selling an asset to a bank to artificially increase profits, knowing that GE could later buy it back. The book also describes problems being hidden in order to please investors, "allowing small problems to become big problems before they were detected".

Some people believe that Immelt's poor performance was caused by him becoming CEO at a bad time, but the book makes the argument that it was caused by his poor decisions. The book covers the problems that were caused by the September 11 attacks, which occurred shortly after Immelt became CEO, and the 2008 financial crisis. It also covers Welch's criticism of Immelt.

== Reception ==
The book has a few chapters that have been described by the Financial Times as being "wearying, choppy, [and] short", which sometimes go into "numbing accounting detail". The Financial Times described the book as being "hard nosed" and "well written". Bill Gates ranked Lights Out as his top summer reading recommendation for 2021.

Gary Sheffer, a former employee of General Electric, has said that there are some inaccuracies in the book. The book says that the company knew about their problem issuing commercial paper in September and October 2008, during the 2008 financial crisis, but hid this from investors. The book says that Immelt had a meeting with Treasury secretary Henry Paulson to "sound the alarm about potential problems at GE. He told the Treasury Secretary that the commercial paper operation was getting worse and that GE was having a hard time selling debt that lasted longer than overnight." Sheffer says that this was untrue, and the meeting was instead about tax reform.
