= HobbyKids Adventures =

American animated web series

- Genre: Comedy; Adventure; Children's television series; Slapstick
- Created by: Butch Hartman
- Directed by: Butch Hartman
- Voices of: Cristina Milizia; Griffin Burns; Johnny Rose
- Theme music composer: Butch Hartman
- Composer: Guy Moon
- Country of origin: United States
- Original language: English
- No. of seasons: 2
- No. of episodes: 27

Production
- Executive producers: Butch Hartman; Albie Hecht; Chris M. Williams
- Producer: Taylor Bradbury
- Running time: 5–6 minutes
- Production companies: Billionfold, Inc.; PocketWatch, Inc.

Original release
- Network: YouTube
- Release: June 22, 2019 – March 14, 2020

HobbyKids Adventures is an American children's animated sitcom web series created by Butch Hartman. It is produced by PocketWatch, Inc. and Billionfold, Inc. for the YouTube channel HobbyFamilyTV. The series follows the adventures of HobbyPig, HobbyFrog, and HobbyBear as they try to make the world a better place with their inventions while evading their archenemies, the SlobbyKids.

The series was released on YouTube on June 22, 2019. It was released on the Nick Jr. Channel app on July 26, 2019. The second season was released on September 21, 2019.

== Premise ==
Based on the real-life YouTube family from HobbyFamilyTV, HobbyKids Adventures follows HobbyPig, HobbyFrog, and HobbyBear as they use inventions to improve the world, only to get into mischief along the way.

== Characters ==
- HobbyPig (voiced by Johnny Rose) - The oldest of the siblings; he is a beige pig who is the leader who jumps quickly into any new situation.
- HobbyFrog (voiced by Griffin Burns) - The middle child; full of curiosity and bold ideas, he is a green frog who is the inventor who uses his skills to aid the HobbyKids in their adventures.
- HobbyBear (voiced by Cristina Milizia) - The youngest of the family; he is a blue bear cub who is known for his cuteness and often gets into mischief but loves having fun with his brothers.
- HobbyMom (voiced by Cristina Milizia) - A white rabbit and the HobbyKids' mother; she is a supportive parent who loves to have fun.
- HobbyDad (voiced by Johnny Rose) - A yellow Labrador Retriever and the HobbyKids' father; like HobbyMom, he enjoys fun adventures and likes supporting his family.
- SlobbyRat (voiced by Johnny Rose) - A rat who is the de facto leader of the SlobbyKids and often comes up with plans to defeat their archenemies, the HobbyKids.
- SlobbySkunk (voiced by Johnny Rose) - A striped skunk who is a member of the SlobbyKids.
- SlobbySnake (voiced by Butch Hartman (episode 2) and Griffin Burns (episodes 4–27) - A Chinese Pit Viper.
- HobbyButterfly (voiced by Jillian Lee) - A butterfly who asks the HobbyKids if they have a sharpener for her pencil.
- Kevin the Hedgehog (voiced by Griffin Burns) - A hedgehog that has no public records or accounts.
- Cammie the Chameleon (voiced by Johnny Rose) - An all-star chameleon who has a famous risk and plays part of every film.
- Gamer Goose (voiced by Jace Diehl) - A goose who has approximately 100 videos (3% uploaded) on HobbyTube.
- Detective Unisquirm (voiced by Jace Diehl) - A detective ostrich who searches for clues and knows a lot about Unisquirm

== Episodes ==
Season	Episodes	Originally released	
Season	Episodes	First released	Last released
1	12	June 22, 2019	September 7, 2019
2	15	September 21, 2019	March 14, 2020

=== Season 1 (2019) ===
No. overall	No. in season	Title	Written by	Storyboard by	Original release date
1	1	"Breaking Bedtime"	Jace Diehl	Nick Kalmar	June 22, 2019
HobbyMom and HobbyDad arrive home, and the HobbyKids build inventions in their attempt to avoid bedtime.
2	2	"The Drawing Board"	Holly Payne	Amanda Lucas & Stephen Picher	June 29, 2019
The HobbyKids invent a crayon which brings drawings to life, but things go awry when their archenemies, the SlobbyKids, plot to steal it.
3	3	"Title Wave"	Jace Diehl	Nick Kalmar	July 6, 2019
In search of the perfect viral video title, the HobbyKids must go to Megabyte Beach.
4	4	"Waste of Space"	Emilia Brennan	Amanda Lucas & Stephen Picher	July 13, 2019
The HobbyKids travel to outer space to stop the SlobbyKids' latest evil plan.
5	5	"Dump Dummies"	Holly Payne	Nick Kalmar	July 20, 2019
The HobbyKids must rescue the SlobbyKids from the dump.
6	6	"Hooray for Hobbywood"	Jace Diehl	Amanda Lucas & Stephen Picher	July 27, 2019
The HobbyKids direct a movie starring their biggest fan, and hire the SlobbyKids as stunt doubles.
7	7	"Maybe Baby Bear"	Rose Frankel	Nick Kalmar	August 3, 2019
HobbyBear tries to prove to his brothers that he is not a baby, but his own adventure in the Giant Egg brings prehistoric peril.
8	8	"Big Bird Battle!"	Emilia Brennan	Nick Kalmar	August 10, 2019
The HobbyKids must save their Giant Egg from an enormous bird.
9	9	"Broken Record"	Emilia Brennan & Butch Hartman	Amanda Lucas & Stephen Picher	August 17, 2019
The HobbyKids attempt to break a world record, but the SlobbyKids' interference threatens to ruin their plans.
10	10	"Hobby, I Shrunk the Kids"	Holly Payne	Amanda Lucas, Stephen Picher, & Christian Andrick	August 24, 2019
After the HobbyKids' latest invention shrinks HobbyBear to be an inch tall, he must figure out how to get his brothers' attention and return to his normal size.
11	11	"Showtime: Bro Time"	Jace Diehl	Nick Kalmar	August 31, 2019
After an employee for Cinemoose Theaters denies them access into a PG-13 rated movie, the HobbyKids disguise themselves as an adult to get in, but the plan backfires a bit on them, in that they get in, but are mistaken for the theater manager.
12	12	"Flavor Fixer"	Emilia Brennan	Thomas Thomas III	September 7, 2019
In an effort to make their mother's casserole taste great, the HobbyKids invent a device to fool their tastebuds, but they accidentally remove their ability to taste anything.

=== Season 2 (2019–20) ===
No. overall	No. in season	Title	Written by	Storyboard by	Original release date
13	1	"The Great Hobby Pie Launch"	Holly Payne	Thomas Thomas III	September 21, 2019
To win a pie-launching contest and the latest game system, the HobbyKids must team up with the SlobbyKids.
14	2	"Runny Bunny"	Allen Rhodes	Thomas Thomas III	September 28, 2019
HobbyFrog invents a magic wand, but it doesn't quite work as planned.
15	3	"Shop 'Til You Drop!"	Jace Diehl	Marcus Velazquez	October 5, 2019
Lost at Massive Mart, the HobbyKids must find a way to return to HobbyMom.
16	4	"Goop in the Wild"	Emilia Brennan	Thomas Thomas III	October 12, 2019
The HobbyKids use up the last of their slime and must figure out how to create more before their robot self-destructs.
17	5	"Bigfoot's Believers"	Allen Rhodes	Thomas Thomas III	October 26, 2019
To make a video showing how easily people are led to believe in Bigfoot, the HobbyKids use HobbyFrog's latest invention to turn HobbyPig into Bigfoot.
18	6	"When Hobby Gives You Lemons"	Holly Payne	Stephen Picher	November 2, 2019
The HobbyKids set up their own "Hobby-Ade" stand, but when the SlobbyKids sell a stolen test batch, the whole town glows in the dark.
19	7	"The Portal Popper"	Jace Diehl	Marcus Velazquez	November 9, 2019
HobbyFrog invents a device that creates portals leading into other dimensions, but trouble arises when HobbyPig falls into one of them.
20	8	"RoboBaby"	David Goodliffe	Tom Bolls	November 16, 2019
The HobbyKids build their own robot baby.
21	9	"Who Framed Detective Unisquirm?"	Jace Diehl	Tyler Letson	December 7, 2019
After Detective Unisquirm is framed and one of HobbyFrog's inventions zaps HobbyBear into the TV show, HobbyBear must help locate the real criminal.
22	10	"Camp Hobby"	Holly Payne	Tom Bolls	December 28, 2019
The HobbyKids have a backyard campout, but their night quickly goes from spooky to Slobby.
23	11	"Burger Bandits"	Rose Frankel	Thomas Thomas III	January 4, 2020
The HobbyKids invent a device that turns anything into burgers. Note: This episode is an unbranded version of the August 2019 Carl's Jr. tie-in episode of the same name, with the restaurant's name changed to Cosmo Burger.
24	12	"Grav-i-Dad"	David Goodliffe	Tyler Letson	February 22, 2020
The HobbyKids attempt to use their new anti-gravity invention to help HobbyDad relax, but will HobbyHuge have to rescue everyone?
25	13	"Brain Freeze"	Emilia Brennan	Tom Bolls	February 29, 2020
When HobbyBear gives himself a brain freeze, HobbyFrog and HobbyPig must venture inside his brain to find his warmest memory.
26	14	"Fast and Froggy"	Allen Rhodes	Tyler Letson	March 7, 2020
To save their town's skate park and "Old Glory" tree, the HobbyKids must beat the SlobbyKids in a car race to win $1000. Guest star: Shiloh Mitchell as Smokey
27	15	"Into the Locker-Verse"	Holly Payne	Charles Moss	March 14, 2020
On their first day back at school, the HobbyKids get transported to an alternate dimension and meet their alternate selves. Guest star: JillianTubeHD as HobbyButterfly

== Broadcast ==
After premiering first on the HobbyFamilyTV YouTube channel on June 22, 2019, the series streamed on Hulu and Amazon Prime Video as well as the Nickelodeon and Nick Jr. Channel apps. It also aired on PocketWatch's 24/7 live-linear channel on Roku Kids & Family and the Hobby Kids live-linear channel on Pluto TV June 29, 2019 on Netflix.

== Reception ==
The first episode of HobbyKids Adventures achieved over 1 million views on YouTube within 5 days of its release and was well-received. To date, the series has over 30 million total views on YouTube.

== Merchandise ==
HobbyKids Adventures merchandise is sold exclusively at Walmart.
