= The Fairly OddParents season 8 =

The Fairly OddParents
- Season 8
- DVD cover
- Showrunner: Butch Hartman
- No. of episodes: 6

Release
- Original network: Nickelodeon
- Original release: February 12 – December 29, 2011

Season chronology
- ← Previous; Season 7 Next → Season 9

The eighth season of the animated television series The Fairly OddParents first aired on Nickelodeon on February 12, 2011, with the episode "Love Triangle". The season ended on December 29, 2011. It is the only season of the series to not feature any episode segments.

== Episodes ==
No. overall	No. in season	Title	Directed by	Written by	Storyboard by	Original release date	Prod. code	Viewers (millions)
121	1	"Love Triangle"	Ken Bruce & Gary Conrad	Dave Thomas, Kevin Sullivan, Will Schifrin, Butch Hartman & Ray DeLaurentis	Dave Thomas & Fred Gonzales	February 12, 2011 (Note: This episode first aired in Latin America on August 26, 2010.)	FOP−343	5.6 (Note: These numbers represent the rating/share that this episode received with children aged 6 through 11.)
121	1	"Love Triangle"	Ken Bruce & Gary Conrad	Dave Thomas, Kevin Sullivan, Will Schifrin, Butch Hartman & Ray DeLaurentis	Dave Thomas & Fred Gonzales	February 12, 2011	FOP−344	5.6
Poof and Foop compete with each other for the lead role in a Spellementary School play along with a triangle shaped female fairy baby named Goldie Goldenglow.
122	2	"Timmy's Secret Wish!"	Dave Thomas	Will Schifrin & Kevin Sullivan	Dave Thomas	November 23, 2011 (Note: This episode first aired in Latin America on November 3, 2011.)	FOP−345 FOP−346	2.91
123	3	"Timmy's Secret Wish!"	Dave Thomas	Will Schifrin & Kevin Sullivan	Dave Thomas	November 23, 2011	FOP−347 FOP−348	2.91
Timmy Turner makes his millionth wish, which all of Fairy World has gathered to celebrate, but after reviewing his wishes, the Fairy Council finds that Timmy should be put on trial for being the "worst godchild ever". Wanda, Cosmo, and Poof try to prove that Timmy is not, until the truth comes out that Timmy has made a secret wish that no one can know about, not even his godfamily, where he wished that nobody would grow old so that he could keep his fairies. He is ultimately ruled guilty, and the entire world ages 50 years into the future as all of Timmy's wishes are rescinded. Timmy, now an 60-year-old old man, runs into Mr. Crocker (who did not age), who takes him back to Fairy World to find Cosmo and Wanda. They rescue Poof and Foop from the "Hocus Poconos," an achromatic wasteland where wishes repealed by Jorgen are kept. He is ultimately reassigned his fairies for his acts of bravery during the rescue. Guest star: Jay Leno as The Crimson Chin
124	4	"Invasion of the Dads"	Ken Bruce & Michelle Bryan	Ray DeLaurentis, Will Schifrin & Kevin Sullivan	Aaron Hammersley & Butch Hartman	June 18, 2011	FOP−351	3.75
124	4	"Invasion of the Dads"	Ken Bruce & Michelle Bryan	Ray DeLaurentis, Will Schifrin & Kevin Sullivan	Aaron Hammersley & Butch Hartman	June 18, 2011	FOP−352	3.75
The Dads that Timmy wished up back in "Add-a-Dad" kidnap his Mom and Timmy (and Mr. Turner) have to rescue her.
125	5	"When L.O.S.E.R.S. Attack"	John McIntyre & Ken Bruce	Ray DeLaurentis, Will Schifrin & Kevin Sullivan	Ed Baker & Butch Hartman	October 15, 2011	FOP−349	4.8
125	5	"When L.O.S.E.R.S. Attack"	John McIntyre & Ken Bruce	Ray DeLaurentis, Will Schifrin & Kevin Sullivan	Ed Baker & Butch Hartman	October 15, 2011	FOP−350	4.8
Timmy Turner's enemies collaborate to form the League of Super Evil Revenge Seekers (L.O.S.E.R.S.) in order to annihilate him at the same time. When a rare astronomical event known as the Fairy-clipse does not allow Cosmo, Wanda, Poof (and also Foop) to use their magic to save him, Timmy must be capable of outwitting the L.O.S.E.R.S. by himself.
126	6	"Meet the OddParents"	Michelle Bryan & John McIntyre	Ray DeLaurentis, Will Schifrin & Kevin Sullivan	Aaron Hammersley, Butch Hartman & Dave Thomas	December 29, 2011	FOP−353	N/A
126	6	"Meet the OddParents"	Michelle Bryan & John McIntyre	Ray DeLaurentis, Will Schifrin & Kevin Sullivan	Aaron Hammersley, Butch Hartman & Dave Thomas	December 29, 2011	FOP−354	N/A
When Timmy's parents discover Cosmo, Wanda, and Poof, Timmy must prevent Jorgen from finding out about it, or else he will lose his fairies forever.

== DVD releases ==
Season	Episodes	Release dates
Season	Episodes	Region 1
8	6	Season 8: March 25, 2014; Episodes: Entire season included The Complete Series: December 10, 2024; Episodes: Entire season included
