= Lights Off (disambiguation) =

"Lights Off" is a 2021 song by We Are Domi.

Lights Off may also refer to:

- "Lights Off", a song by Jay Sean from his 2009 album All or Nothing
- "Lights Off", a 2021 song by Alpharad's band Ace of Hearts

== See also ==
- Lights On (disambiguation)
- Lights Out (disambiguation)
