= Ted Mann (journalist) =

American reporter

- Born: Pennsylvania
- Education: New York University; Germantown Friends School
- Occupation: Journalist
- Years active: 2002- present
- Spouse: Annie Karni (m. 2015–2025)

Ted Mann is an American journalist covering domestic policy at Bloomberg News. He was previously the transportation reporter for the Greater New York section of The Wall Street Journal and is credited with breaking the story on Bridgegate.

In 2019, Mann worked in the Journal's Washington bureau.

== Education ==
Mann graduated from New York University in 2002 with a B.A. in English and American literature.

== Career ==
Before joining the Journal, Mann covered public sector issues in Connecticut. He also previously worked as a political correspondent and enterprise reporter at The Day of New London. In his role at Bloomberg, Mann regularly appears on podcasts.

== Awards ==
Mann won two first place awards from the New England Associated Press News Executives Association. In 2010, for his coverage of a visit to Cuba by the American ship Amistad and in 2008, for continuing coverage of the presidential primary contests in Iowa, New Hampshire and Connecticut.

== Bibliography ==
- Gryta, Thomas; Mann, Ted (2020). Lights Out: Pride, Delusion, and the Fall of General Electric. Houghton Mifflin Harcourt. ISBN 978-0-358-25041-8.
