= Lights Out (Rick Astley song) =

Single by Rick Astley
- Released: 7 June 2010
- Recorded: 2010
- Genre: Pop rock; soft rock
- Length: 3:07
- Label: Cruz
- Songwriter(s): Rick Astley; Andrew Frampton
- Producer(s): Rick Astley

Rick Astley singles chronology
"Keep It Turned On" (2002)	"Lights Out" (2010)	"Till The Day That I Die" (2011)

Music video
- "Lights Out" on YouTube

"Lights Out" is a pop song performed by English singer-songwriter Rick Astley. It was his first mainstream single in the UK in nearly 17 years. The song was performed to an audience for the first time on Peter Kay's 2010 tour which commenced at the MEN Arena, Manchester on 27 April 2010. Astley was unveiled as a surprise special guest and performed a medley of his old hits before revealing his new song.

"Lights Out" was released as a digital download on 7 June 2010 and it received its first airplay on the Ken Bruce show on BBC Radio 2. Despite becoming a UK radio hit, it didn't sell well, peaking only at number 97 on the UK Singles Chart.

== Charts ==
Chart (2010)	Peak position
UK Indie (OCC)	8
UK Singles (OCC)	97
UK Singles Downloads (OCC)	95
