= Lights Out (Silverline song) =

Single by Silverline

from the album Lights Out
- Released: February 19, 2013
- Genre: CCM, Christian Rock, Pop rock
- Length: 3:24 (single); 3:27 (album)
- Label: Dream
- Songwriters: Ryan Edberg, Ben Kasica, Chris Semel, Jonathan Steingard
- Producer: Kasica

Silverline singles chronology
"Shine a Light" (2011)	"Lights Out" (2013)

"Lights Out" is a song by Contemporary Christian-Rock-Pop rock- band Silverline from their first studio album, Lights Out. It was released on February 19, 2013 by Reach Records, as the first single from the album. The song was produced by Ben Kasica.

== Background ==
The song was produced by Ben Kasica, and the song was co-written by Ryan Edberg, Ben Kasica, Chris Semel, Jonathan Steingard.

== Release ==
"Lights Out" was digitally released as the lead single from Lights Out on February 19, 2013 by Reach Records.

== Videos ==
=== Music ===
The band has made a lyric video on YouTube of the song.

== Weekly charts ==
Charts (2013)	Peak position
Billboard Christian Rock Songs	1
