= Lights Out (Silverline album) =

Studio album by Silverline
- Released: April 9, 2013
- Genre: Contemporary Christian music, Christian rock, pop rock
- Length: 37:31
- Label: Dream
- Producer: Ben Kasica

Silverline chronology
Voices in the Night EP (2010)	Lights Out (2013)

Singles from Lights Out
- 1. "Lights Out" Released: February 19, 2013

Lights Out is the first studio album by the Christian contemporary Christian music band Silverline, which was released on April 9, 2013 by Dream Records, and the producer on the album was Ben Kasica.

== Music and lyrics ==
On the subject of musicality, Tyler Hess of Christian Music Zine liked the "musical assault on the faster tracks, but they still need something to make them stand out from the crowd." Kevin Hoskins of Jesus Freak Hideout is in agreement because he told that the album "maintains a great eternally driven perspective, but with subpar music and nothing unique delivered. Those who dig the soft rock scene will truly enjoy the album, but if you're looking for something other than what's played on the radio every day, this won't be for you." On the other hand, CM Addict's Kevin Thorson told that "every song from end to end is infused with brilliant rock chords and upbeat drum tracks", which "has a very consistent sound throughout and plays well when listened to as a whole." In agreement, Tony Cummings of Cross Rhythms said that "there's enough edge in the guitar work and screamed bits in the vocals to draw in some hard music headbangers and enough catchy hooks to ensure that pop fans will come back for more." Indie Vision Music's Lee Brown evoked that the listener would "come for the addictive and memorable guitar licks with slightly pop-infused catchiness, but you’ll stay for the message that sits behind it." At New Release Tuesday, Jonathan Francesco alluded to how "the vocals carry a peppy vibe to them but the music and melodies are pure rock. This led to an interesting dynamic where in one song, you could hear a chorus that would fit well on pop/rock radio but then some screams and yells were thrown into verses and the bridge that made it sound a lot edgier. I thought it was an interesting musical approach and one that Silverline always pulled it off flawlessly. And this album is no exception." Lastly, Bert Gangl of Jesus Freak Hideout called it "refreshing to know that the men of Silverline haven't forgotten the value of a dirty blues lick or perfectly-placed power chord." At HM, Barry Stagg felt that the release "allows the listener to be encompassed by the uplifting atmosphere it sets out to create", and the album is one that the listener would "turn up loud in the car and sing your lungs out to."

With respect to lyrics, Hess found that "as the production sounds hollow at times and the lyricism is not particularly memorable" However, Francesco would not agree because he told that "lyrically, vocally, and musically, Silverline is at the top of their game with this release." Gangl told that if "eliminating the more generic songs still leaves roughly two thirds of an album's worth of topnotch music - which actually surpasses the quantity found on its predecessor. In the same way, while the members of Silverline aren't quite bard material, the majority of their lyrical shortcomings are compensated for on the harder-rocking compositions, where passion and earnestness conceivably count for as much as, if not more than, any literary or poetic aspirations." Louder Than the Music's Jono Davies told that "what Silverline do have that other modern and relevant sounding bands don't, is the worship lyrics which are refreshing to hear mixed with solid pop/rock tunes." At HM, Stagg told that "each song has a clear message and the record really puts you into a good place listening to it." In addition, Stagg said that the album is in the vein of "true pop-rock style with catchy guitar riffs and driving, catchy hooks."

== Reception ==
=== Critical ===
Professional ratings
Review scores
Source	Rating
Christian Music Zine	3/5 stars
CM Addict	4.5/5 stars
Cross Rhythms	9/10 squares
HM	3.5/5 stars
Indie Vision Music	4/5 stars
Jesus Freak Hideout	3.5/5 stars 3/5 stars
Louder Than the Music	4/5 stars
New Release Tuesday	4.5/5 stars

Lights Out has received mostly positive reviews from the critics. At Christian Music Zine, Hess called the effort on that contains "energetic, guitar driven, rock and roll frenzy of ambition and desire for the kingdom of God." Thorson of CM Addict found the album to be an "excellent continuation of a great list of releases from Silverline", which he proclaimed the release as "one of the best rock albums out there." Cross Rhythms' Cummings told that the band was "confident enough to grab the opportunity that a record label debut offers while resisting the temptation to clone the Coldplay sound which makes much CCM rock so stereotypical." At HM, Stagg wrote that the Silverline "delivers a really solid record" that contains "simplicity", which he called "refreshing." At Indie Vision Music, Lee Brown found the album to be "upbeat and positive from start to finish" because "few bands offer up more unabashed hope through an overly positive outlook than what Silverline brings to the table. With an album that is certain to see several songs become staples on K-Love and Air1, Lights Out is sure to be a stand out album this year." Jesus Freak Hideout's Gangl wrote that the release is a "better-than-average effort that, although it falls shy of the consistently infectious gumption of Voices, it still offers plenty to love for those in both the radio-listening and rock-loving camps." Also of Jesus Freak Hideout, Hoskins told that the album is "one of those albums that will be liked by some and passed over by many", and noted that the release "won't stand out in the overstocked music aisle." Davies of Louder Than the Music told that "the album has a few different kinds of songs from rock with swagger, to anthems and ballads, and these mix together to create a solid release." At New Release Tuesday, Francesco closed with noting that "there's really little fault to be had with this album. It's definitely got the potential to really put Silverline on the map. And they're one step closer to releasing a truly game-changing rock record. If these guys keep at it, you can definitely expect to see them among the top tier of Christian Rock's biggest names."

=== Commercial ===
On April 27, 2013, the album was the No. 13 most sold Billboard Top Heatseekers album. Plus, it was the No. 34 most sold Christian & Gospel Album in the United States the same week.

== Track listing ==
Track list
No.	Title	Writer(s)	Length
1.	"Hold On"	Steve Adams, Ryan Edberg	3:05
2.	"Lights Out"	Edberg, Ben Kasica, Chris Semel, Jonathan Steingard	3:27
3.	"Never Looking Back"	Adams, Edberg, Kasica	4:04
4.	"With the Angels"	Edberg	4:05
5.	"Vicious"	Chris Clonts, Edberg, Kasica, Nick Radovanovic	2:48
6.	"Found in You"	Clonts, Edberg, Kasica, Radovanovic	3:59
7.	"Be Still"	Adams, Edberg	3:57
8.	"War"	Edberg, Kasica, Radovanovic	3:23
9.	"Something Better"	Clonts, Edberg, Kasica	3:56
10.	"Too Far Gone"	Adams	4:47
Total length:			37:31

== Charts ==
=== Album ===
Chart (2013)	Peak position
US Christian & Gospel (Billboard)	34
US Top Heatseekers (Billboard)	13
