= The Fairly OddParents season 7 =

The Fairly OddParents
- Season 7
- DVD cover
- Showrunner: Butch Hartman
- No. of episodes: 20 (39 segments)

Release
- Original network: Nickelodeon
- Original release: July 6, 2009 – August 5, 2012

Season chronology
- ← Previous; Season 6 Next → Season 8

The seventh season of the American animated television series The Fairly OddParents premiered on July 6, 2009. On July 10 of that year, a special called "Anti-Poof" also aired, introducing new series villain, Foop. The season ended on August 5, 2012.

== Episodes ==
No. overall	No. in season	Title	Directed by	Written by	Storyboard by	Original release date	Prod. code	US viewers (millions)
101	1	"Anti-Poof"	Michelle Bryan & Gary Conrad	Ray DeLaurentis, Butch Hartman, Kevin Sullivan & Ed Valentine	Brandon Kruse & Aaron Hammersley	July 10, 2009	FOP−303	N/A
101	1	"Anti-Poof"	Michelle Bryan & Gary Conrad	Ray DeLaurentis, Butch Hartman, Kevin Sullivan & Ed Valentine	Brandon Kruse & Aaron Hammersley	July 10, 2009	FOP−304	N/A
Since all Fairies have an Anti-Fairy counterpart, it was only a matter of time until Poof's was born. Anti-Wanda gave birth to a square-shaped Anti-Fairy baby named Foop, and from the moment he was born, Foop is already even more intelligent and evil than his father, Anti-Cosmo, and turns on the Anti-Fairies by turning Anti-Fairy World into a colorful place. Soon after, Foop learns about the lack of fanfare surrounding his birth, and learns that his Fairy counterpart, Poof, was already born before him, stealing the title of first magic baby born in thousands of years. Foop now sets his sights on getting rid of Poof so that he will get all of the attention. Unfortunately for him and the rest of Anti-Fairy World, Timmy and his fairies have more than one trick up their sleeves. Guest star: Mary Hart as Fairy Hart
102	2	"Add-a-Dad"	Michelle Bryan	Story by : Ray DeLaurentis & Butch Hartman; Teleplay by : Kevin Sullivan	Heather Martinez	August 11, 2009	FOP−306	N/A
102	2	"Squirrely Puffs"	Ken Bruce & Butch Hartman	Kevin Sullivan	Fred Gonzales	August 13, 2009	FOP−305	N/A
Mr. Turner is very busy working; so busy, in fact, that whenever he and Timmy are doing something fun, Mr. Turner will be called off, abandoning his son. To fix this, Timmy finds a solution, to wish up many Dads, so that every time one of them has to leave he will have a replacement. However, when the Dads keep leaving, soon there are too many Dads that all want Timmy for themselves, leaving Timmy to have to remove them. It's a race between the Squirrel Scouts and the Cream Puffs to the top of Mount Doom. Timmy and his Dad's team must survive this harrowing challenge, or Mom, Tootie, and the girls will make them turn tail.
103	3	"Micecapades"	Gary Conrad	Ray DeLaurentis	Butch Hartman & Vic Harrison	July 8, 2009	FOP−307	N/A
103	3	"Formula for Disaster"	Michelle Bryan	Will Schifrin	Butch Hartman & Dan Haskett	July 7, 2009	FOP−308	N/A
When Poof watches too much of the violent classic "cat and mouse" cartoon, "Sleazy and Cheezy", he turns Timmy and Vicky into the characters from the show, and Timmy must find a way to get back to normal before he is eaten alive by Vicky. Poof's refusal to take his medicine and Mr. Crocker's visit to the Turner residence to complain about Timmy's bad grades leads to chaos in the Turner household when Mr. and Mrs. Turner accidentally drink Poof's formula, causing them to fall into a deep sleep. The situation gets worse when his parents sign Timmy's life away into Crocker's military school, which he now has to get out of.
104	4	"Bad Heir Day"	Ken Bruce	Kevin Sullivan	Aaron Hammersley	July 6, 2009	FOP−309	N/A
104	4	"Freaks & Greeks"	Gary Conrad	Tom Krajewski	Fred Gonzales	September 30, 2009	FOP−310	N/A
Mr. Crocker gets a hold of Poof and decides to groom him to be the heir to his "fame and fortune". Meanwhile, Timmy is panicking about losing Poof and looks for him in all of the places he took him. Timmy wishes to be at a "real" toga party and ends up on Mount Olympus with real gods, but when he accidentally destroys their home, they decide to party at Timmy's house instead.
105	5	"Fly Boy"	Michelle Bryan	Ed Valentine	Brandon Kruse	August 14, 2009	FOP−312	N/A
105	5	"Temporary Fairy"	Ken Bruce	Amy Keating Rogers	Dave Thomas	September 29, 2009	FOP−311	N/A
Timmy and Poof want to watch a horror movie, but are forbidden by their parents from watching it. They soon get magically transformed into fly size, and a fly's head gets stuck on Timmy's body. Cosmo and Wanda are too busy taking care of Poof to tend to an overly adventurous Timmy, so he wishes up a "temporary fairy". Timmy's temporary fairy--Jorgen--is more than happy to fulfill Timmy's wishes, especially the more dangerous ones.
106	6	"Crocker Shocker"	Gary Conrad	Story by : Amy Keating Rogers; Teleplay by : Kevin Sullivan	Aaron Hammersley	September 28, 2009	FOP−313	N/A
106	6	"Super Zero"	Ken Bruce	Ray DeLaurentis & Will Schifrin	Fred Gonzales	October 1, 2009	FOP−314	N/A
Mr. Crocker is hypnotized into no longer believing in fairies. Unfortunately, it turns out his belief powered Fairy World's magic. Timmy and his godparents must now find a way to make Crocker believe again, or else Fairy World will lose magic and plummet out of the sky. Cosmo is expelled from the house because of being an annoyance to everyone, and he suddenly turns into a superhero after he is seen flying and saving Poof by the citizens of Dimmsdale.
107	7	"Dadbra-Cadabra"	Gary Conrad	Gary Conrad	Dave Thomas	October 2, 2009	FOP−315	N/A
107	7	"Timmy Turnip"	Michelle Bryan	Story by : Ray DeLaurentis & Will Schifrin; Teleplay by : Will Schifrin	Butch Hartman & Cindy Morrow	August 10, 2009	FOP−316	N/A
Mr. Crocker suspects that Mr Turner is a fairy when Timmy and his fairies help him with his magic act, but they prove him wrong. Timmy meets his grandparents Grandpa Vlad and Grandma Gladys who host a long and disgusting Yak-filled holiday at his house called "Yaksgiving". After a week of torment, Timmy foolishly wishes they never came to America--but then he finds himself back in Ustinkistan, his grandparents' native country, which is barren and populated by turnips and werewolves, with no money or useful magic (every time he makes a wish, he receives turnips instead) to get back home.
108	8	"One Man Banned"	Michelle Bryan	Ed Valentine	Aaron Hammersley	October 16, 2009	FOP−319	N/A
108	8	"Frenemy Mine"	Ken Bruce	Kevin Sullivan	Brandon Kruse	October 16, 2009	FOP−317	N/A
After Timmy is rejected from the school band, he wishes everyone would love his music. However, when Timmy gets his first taste of acclaim, Wanda has to stop him before he becomes completely fame-crazed. After Timmy saves Vicky's life after her attempt to torment him backfires, her fellow evil babysitters shun her. After Timmy suggests to her that she try being friendly, Vicky begins to smother Timmy with friendliness, and he must find a way to change her back to her mean self, since she will not let anyone else near him.
109	9	"Chicken Poofs"	Gary Conrad	Ray DeLaurentis & Will Schifrin	Fred Gonzales	April 9, 2010	FOP−318	N/A
109	9	"Stupid Cupid"	Ken Bruce	Will Schifrin	Heather Martinez	February 6, 2010	FOP−320	5.2 (Note: These numbers represent the rating/share that this episode received with children aged 6 through 11.)
Poof becomes sick with Chicken Poofs, an infectious fairy disease that turns him into a chicken and turns other people into chickens when he sneezes on them. Although Dr. Rip Studwell has the cure, Poof is afraid of the needle and runs away. Timmy and Cosmo must catch him and cure his illness before the whole of Dimmsdale is turned into chickens. Meanwhile, Dr. Rip Studwell and Wanda search a Fairy World temple for more medicine, since all of it has been accidentally dropped. After being rejected yet again and again by Trixie, Timmy seeks help from Cupid, only to find that he is unavailable as he is on vacation. Therefore, Timmy takes Cupid's bows and arrows and entrusts Cosmo into the temporary role of Cupid so he can make Trixie fall in love with him. Unfortunately, Cosmo messes everything up again by missing his shots and hitting the wrong targets, and soon Cosmo and Wanda, Mr. Turner and a dead rosebush, Mrs. Turner and Mr. Crocker are head over heels in love for each other. When Trixie is finally hit with the arrows and falls in love with Timmy, Timmy realizes now has to save his mother before she becomes the new Mrs. Crocker.
110	10	"Double-Oh Schnozmo!"	Gary Conrad	Kevin Sullivan	Brandon Kruse	September 11, 2010	FOP−321	4.0
110	10	"Planet Poof"	Michelle Bryan	Ed Valentine	Dave Thomas	April 5, 2010	FOP−322	N/A
Cosmo's brother, Schnozmo, comes to visit, claiming to be a secret agent. When he turns out to be nothing but a wallet-stealing, dining and dashing con man, Cosmo is heartbroken. To restore Cosmo's faith in his brother, Wanda and Timmy force Schnozmo to take part in a fake mission. Guest star: Dana Carvey as Schnozmo Poof wants to play spaceship, but since everyone is busy, he goes off in search of a play partner. However, he winds up in Yugopotamia where the unappreciated and overworked Queen Jipjorrulac uses his cuteness to scare her family and subjects into catering to her every whim.
111	11	"The Boss of Me"	Ken Bruce	Charlotte Fullerton	Aaron Hammersley	September 11, 2010	FOP−323	4.0
111	11	"He Poofs He Scores!"	Michelle Bryan	Ray DeLaurentis & Will Schifrin	Fred Gonzales	April 6, 2010	FOP−325	N/A
When Timmy visits his dad's office, he wishes a pencil that will last forever so that his father will get in better standings with his mean boss, Mr. Ed Leadly. Later, however, when Mr. Leadly finds out that Timmy was the one who came up with the everlasting pencil, he makes Timmy the new boss and his first task is to fire his dad. Timmy's soccer team, the Dimmsdale Victims, cannot beat Dinkleberg's team, The Dinkle Ducks, because Timmy is benched after one game. While eating his breakfast, however, Timmy accidentally swallows Poof, who enters Timmy's brain and uses magic to enhance Timmy's skills, turning him into an all-star soccer player. Now, Timmy must find a way to keep Cosmo and Wanda from finding Poof so that he can win the championship against Dinkleberg's team, or else they will take his magical powers away because Da Rules forbid cheating.
112	12	"Playdate of Doom"	Gary Conrad	Kevin Sullivan	Heather Martinez	April 7, 2010	FOP−324	N/A
112	12	"Teacher's Pet"	Ken Bruce	Ray DeLaurentis & Will Schifrin	Dave Thomas	April 8, 2010	FOP−326	N/A
Foop escapes from Abracatraz and, using a recording of Jorgen's voice, tricks Wanda into thinking that Jorgen has rehabilitated Foop and that the Anti-Fairy baby is ready for a play date with Poof. While Foop seems to have good intentions at first, as soon as Cosmo and Wanda turn their backs on him, Foop terrorizes Poof, and then cries and blames Poof when his parents return and threaten to throw his stars in his Good Boy chart in the trash. Timmy is the only one who can warn Cosmo and Wanda of Foop's true intentions, but his pesky parents continue to pull Timmy away before he can speak; and if Poof keeps committing a crime and getting himself into trouble with the law, then he will be arrested and sentenced to twenty years in prison--in Foop's inter-dimensional play pen of doom, anyway. Tired of A.J. being a suck-up to Mr. Crocker and getting good grades for it, Timmy wishes that he was the teacher's pet, but Poof turns him into Mr. Crocker's guinea pig. The problem worsens because Mr. Crocker is going to use guinea pig Timmy for his experiment, which is a genetic hybrid of different animals that create the ultimate Fairy-catching monster.
113	13	"Manic Mom-Day"	Michelle Bryan	Kevin Sullivan	Brandon Kruse	September 18, 2010	FOP−327	4.7
113	13	"Crocker of Gold"	Gary Conrad	Will Schifrin	Butch Hartman	September 18, 2010	FOP−328	4.7
Wanda swaps Timmy and his mother's brains for a day to make him realize a mother's life is not as easy as he thinks. After a near-death experience, Mr. Crocker decides to forget about fairies and starts to hunt leprechauns, but when a leprechaun-disguised Cosmo gives him the pot of gold from the McRough leprechaun clan, Wanda and Poof are taken hostage, and Timmy and Cosmo must get it back.
114	14	"Beach Blanket Bozos"	Michelle Bryan	Ed Valentine	Heather Martinez	August 15, 2011 (Note: This episode was first released on The Fairly Odd Parents: Season 7 DVD on June 10, 2011.)	FOP−330	N/A
114	14	"Poltergeeks"	Ken Bruce	Ed Valentine	Fred Gonzales & Greg Rankin	August 15, 2011	FOP−329	N/A
In a trip to Hawaii, Timmy wishes his parents were the best surfers on the beach in order to impress a pretty hula girl, but that wish starts a wish limbo, in which they will not stop fighting until only one of them prevails as the best surfer. Timmy has Cosmo, Wanda, and Poof pose as ghosts so that his parents can re-live their glory days as ghost hunters.
115	15	"Old Man and the C-"	Gary Conrad	Kevin Sullivan	Dave Thomas	July 14, 2011	FOP−331	N/A
115	15	"Balance of Flour"	Ken Bruce	Ray DeLaurentis & Will Schifrin	Brandon Kruse	July 14, 2011	FOP−332	N/A
When Mr. Turner reveals he dropped off school at 5th grade, he attempts to graduate from Dimmsdale Elementary School in order to make his son proud. Centuries ago, the Anti-Fairies and Fairies started an annual bake-off to determine which species gets godchildren. This year, Jorgen's recipe is at risk, and Anti-Cosmo and Anti-Wanda are determined to make sure they make Timmy their godchild by stealing the recipe and cheating the fairies out of the competition. Timmy now has to get the recipe back so the Anti-Fairies' scheme will backfire and he will remain Cosmo and Wanda's godchild. Guest star: Mary Hart as Fairy Hart
116	16	"Food Fight"	Michelle Bryan	Ed Valentine	Aaron Hammersley	July 12, 2011	FOP−333	N/A
116	16	"Please Don't Feed the Turners"	Gary Conrad	Ray DeLaurentis & Will Schifrin	Fred Gonzales	July 12, 2011	FOP−334	N/A
After Timmy almost had to eat Mom's stinky food, Timmy wishes his mom was the best cook on Earth, but when she enters a cooking competition, the magic wears off and she has to face the challenge alone. Doug Dimmadome, owner of the Dimmsdale Dimmadome, selects the Turners to go on a space mission, but it turns out he was really Dark Laser in disguise, with an elaborate plan to take revenge on Timmy and trap the Turners in a space zoo on his Death Ball. Timmy's parents are revealed to be more intelligent than before, because they (smartly) say the opposite of what they want so Dark Laser will do "terrible things" (opposite of what they want) to them.
117	17	"Take and Fake"	Ken Bruce	Kevin Sullivan	Heather Martinez	February 6, 2010	FOP−335	5.2
117	17	"Cosmo Rules"	Michelle Bryan	Joanna Lewis	Brandon Kruse	July 11, 2011	FOP−336	5.2
Timmy borrows Mark Chang's "iFake" disguising device in order to attend Trixie's costume party. Unfortunately for him, his lack of knowledge about Yugopotamian technology puts him in a tight spot when he accidentally puts the device in shuffle mode, turning him into different monsters. When Jorgen gets the trickups (hiccups that cause stage magician-like trick magic), he is unable to enforce Da Rules, so he must pass it on to his closest relative until he gets better. Unfortunately, his closest relative is Cosmo, his long-lost cousin, and chaos instantly ensues.
118	18	"Lights Out"	Ken Bruce	Story by : Butch Hartman (uncredited); Teleplay by : Kevin Sullivan	Dave Thomas	July 13, 2011	FOP−338	N/A
118	18	"Dad Overboard"	Gary Conrad	Ray DeLaurentis & Will Schifrin	Aaron Hammersley	July 13, 2011	FOP−337	N/A
After Timmy tells Poof a scary story, the baby's crying keeps him up all night, so Timmy wishes for no light for twelve hours of the day. However, Timmy does not know that when his godparents are kept in the dark for longer than eight hours, they become "Boogie Godparents" and turn on their godchild. After Dad gets lost while looking for their hotel and lands on a deserted island, he struggles to make a boat to save his family to prove his masculinity and does not let anyone help him. Meanwhile, Poof finds a nuclear bomb in the sand and Cosmo activates it, putting the Turners' life at risk unless Timmy can defuse it.
119	19	"Farm Pit"	Michelle Bryan	Ed Valentine	Fred Gonzales	August 5, 2012	FOP−339	2.49
119	19	"Crock Talk"	Gary Conrad	Ray DeLaurentis & Will Schifrin	Heather Martinez & Butch Hartman	July 11, 2011	FOP−340	N/A
Frustrated with his job because he keeps getting stuck in traffic, Mr. Turner quits and tries to start up a farm instead. Unfortunately, despite believing he has a green thumb, he has no luck at growing anything, so Timmy wishes his father's crops would grow huge. Now, however, Timmy's father has so much success that he wants his family to stay on the farm forever. Things get even harder when the fairies are swept away by a tornado and end up in Cleveland, which means Timmy has to do much of the work alone. After mysterious appearances of monsters in Dimmsdale, Crocker starts a webshow to comment on it, and asks for viewers to call if they see a monster.
120	20	"Spellementary School"	Michelle Bryan	Kevin Sullivan	Dave Thomas	February 26, 2011	FOP−341	4.7
120	20	"Operation: Dinkleberg"	Ken Bruce	Ray DeLaurentis & Will Schifrin	Brandon Kruse	February 26, 2011	FOP−342	4.7
With Poof's first day in spellementary school, he and Foop compete to be the most popular student there, but Foop takes it to extremes when it becomes clear that his classmates favour his fairy counterpart more than him. Mr. Turner becomes obsessed with proving Dinkleberg is evil, and drags Timmy into a 24/7 spying mission, leaving Timmy unable to contact his fairies or ask for wishes.

== DVD releases ==
Season	Episodes	Release dates
Season	Episodes	Region 1
7	20	Season 7: June 10, 2011; Episodes: Entire season included The Complete Series: December 10, 2024; Episodes: Entire season included
