= Lights On =

Lights On may refer to:

- "Lights On" (Katy B song), 2010
- "Lights On" (Wiley song), 2013
- "Lights On", a 2022 song by Hatchie
- "Lights On", a song by H.E.R. from the 2017 compilation album H.E.R.
- "Lights On", a song by Sean Paul from the 2014 album Full Frequency
- "Lights On", a song by Shawn Mendes from the 2016 album Illuminate
- "Lights On", a 2022 song by Yours Truly

== See also ==
- Lights Off (disambiguation)
- Lights Out (disambiguation)
