= International Christian Film & Music Festival =

Film festival

- Location: Orlando, Florida, U.S.
- Started: 2011
- Founded by: Christopher Cuff; David Hoenig; Marty Jean-Louis

International Christian Film & Music Festival is an annual film festival that was founded in 2011 in Orlando, Florida.

== History ==
It is the largest Christian film festival in the world. Marty Jean-Louis is the executive director and founded the festival with Christopher Cuff and David Hoenig after attending a nearby Christian festival. Submissions are considered by ten judges, five film industry executives and five casual audience viewers. It is the only other film festival also screening in France during the Cannes Film Festival.

In its first year, the festival had 30 films at the Crowne Plaza hotel. During its fourth year, the festival had 2,000 attendees and by the fifth year, the event screened 165 films and music videos over three days. During its ninth year, Daisy Morales announced their support for the festival's endeavors. In 2015, the festival featured over 60 films, 8 music videos and The Masked Saint won Best Picture.

=== Lifetime Achievement recipients ===
- Kirk Cameron
- Louis Gossett Jr.

=== Notable attendees ===
- Stephen Baldwin
- Dave Christiano
- Rich Christiano
- Ernie Hudson
- Nick Loeb
- Shawn Michaels
- Jeannie Ortega
- Kevin Sorbo
- Jaci Velasquez
- David A.R. White
