= Butch Hartman =

American animator (born 1965)

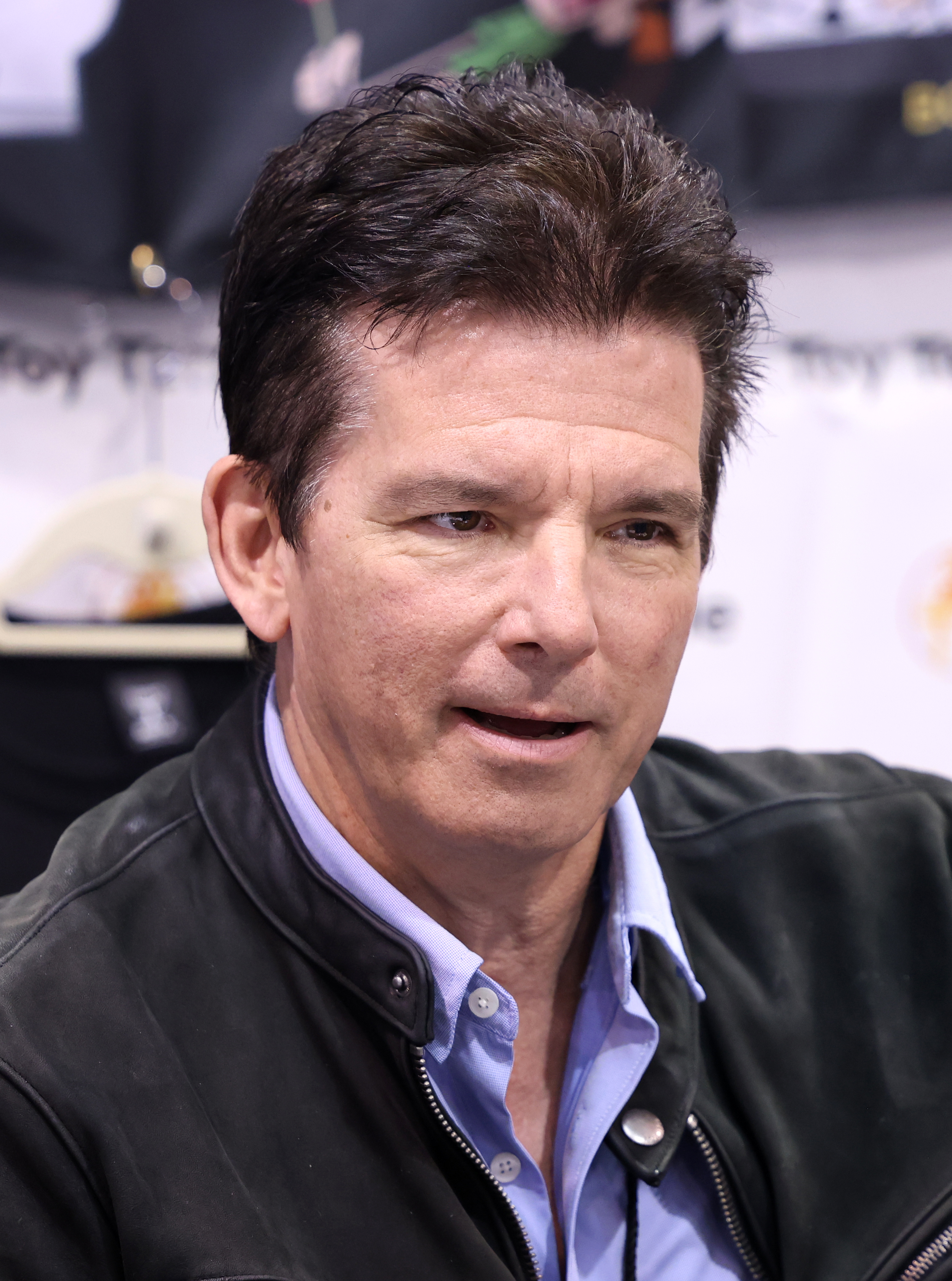
- Hartman at the 2025 WonderCon
- Born: Elmer Earl Hartman IV; January 10, 1965 (age 61); Highland Park, Michigan, U.S.
- Education: California Institute of the Arts (BFA)
- Occupations: Animator; illustrator; writer; producer; director; voice actor
- Years active: 1984–present
- Employer(s): Nickelodeon (1998–2018)
- Known for: The Fairly OddParents; Danny Phantom; T.U.F.F. Puppy; Bunsen Is a Beast
- Spouse: Julieann Hartman (m. 1992)
- Children: 2
- Website: www.youtube.com/@ButchHartmanArt

Elmer Earl "Butch" Hartman IV (born January 10, 1965) is an American animator, illustrator, writer, producer, director, and voice actor. He is best known for creating the animated television shows The Fairly OddParents, Danny Phantom, T.U.F.F. Puppy, and Bunsen Is a Beast for Nickelodeon. He founded the company Billionfold Inc. in 2003 to produce the shows. Hartman executive produced all 4 of his Nickelodeon shows for their entire runs. His work has been nominated for multiple Daytime/Primetime Emmys, Annie Awards and won several BMI Film & TV Awards.

In February 2018, Hartman announced his departure from Nickelodeon after almost 20 years; this resulted in the end of Bunsen Is a Beast production after one season.

In 2021, he returned to the studio to produce The Fairly OddParents: Fairly Odder, a live-action Fairly OddParents sequel which premiered on Paramount+ the following year and aired for one season. In 2023, his first non-secular animated program, The Garden, premiered on the Christian streaming service Pure Flix.

== Early life ==
Hartman was born on January 10, 1965, in Highland Park, Michigan, a suburb of Detroit. His parents are Linda and Elmer Hartman III, a doctor. He received the nickname Butch as a young boy and continued to use it as an adult. Hartman spent his childhood in Roseville, Michigan, and his teenage years in New Baltimore, Michigan. He graduated from Anchor Bay High School in New Baltimore in 1983 and subsequently attended the California Institute of the Arts in Valencia, California. He graduated in 1987 with a Bachelor of Fine Arts degree. As a young student, he appeared on The Match Game-Hollywood Squares Hour, winning nearly $3,000.

== Career ==
=== Early career ===
While attending CalArts, Hartman interned as an in-between animator on the Don Bluth film An American Tail. Before graduating, he was a contestant on the Match Game-Hollywood Squares Hour for three episodes, and shortly after graduating, he was hired as a character designer and storyboard artist for the 1986–1987 My Little Pony. As he had no previous experience with storyboards, he was soon fired. Afterwards, he found work with Ruby-Spears, where he worked on It's Punky Brewster and Dink, the Little Dinosaur. He was also a member of the video reference crew for the Disney film Pocahontas.

In the early 1990s, he was hired as an artist in the model department at Hanna-Barbera and was eventually contacted by studio president Fred Seibert to create the shorts Pfish and Chip and Gramps for Seibert's animated incubator series What a Cartoon!. Eventually, he became a writer, director and storyboard artist for several early Cartoon Network shows, including Dexter's Laboratory, Johnny Bravo, Cow and Chicken, and I Am Weasel. After his contract with Hanna-Barbera expired, he went to work with Seibert at his newfound Frederator studio, on his successor incubator series, Oh Yeah! Cartoons, for Nickelodeon.

During his time working at Hanna-Barbera, he became acquainted with future Family Guy creator Seth MacFarlane. The two would later make the short Zoomates together for Oh Yeah! Cartoons. The character Dr. Elmer Hartman in Family Guy was named after Hartman. He also voiced various characters in the show's first season.

=== Working at Nickelodeon ===
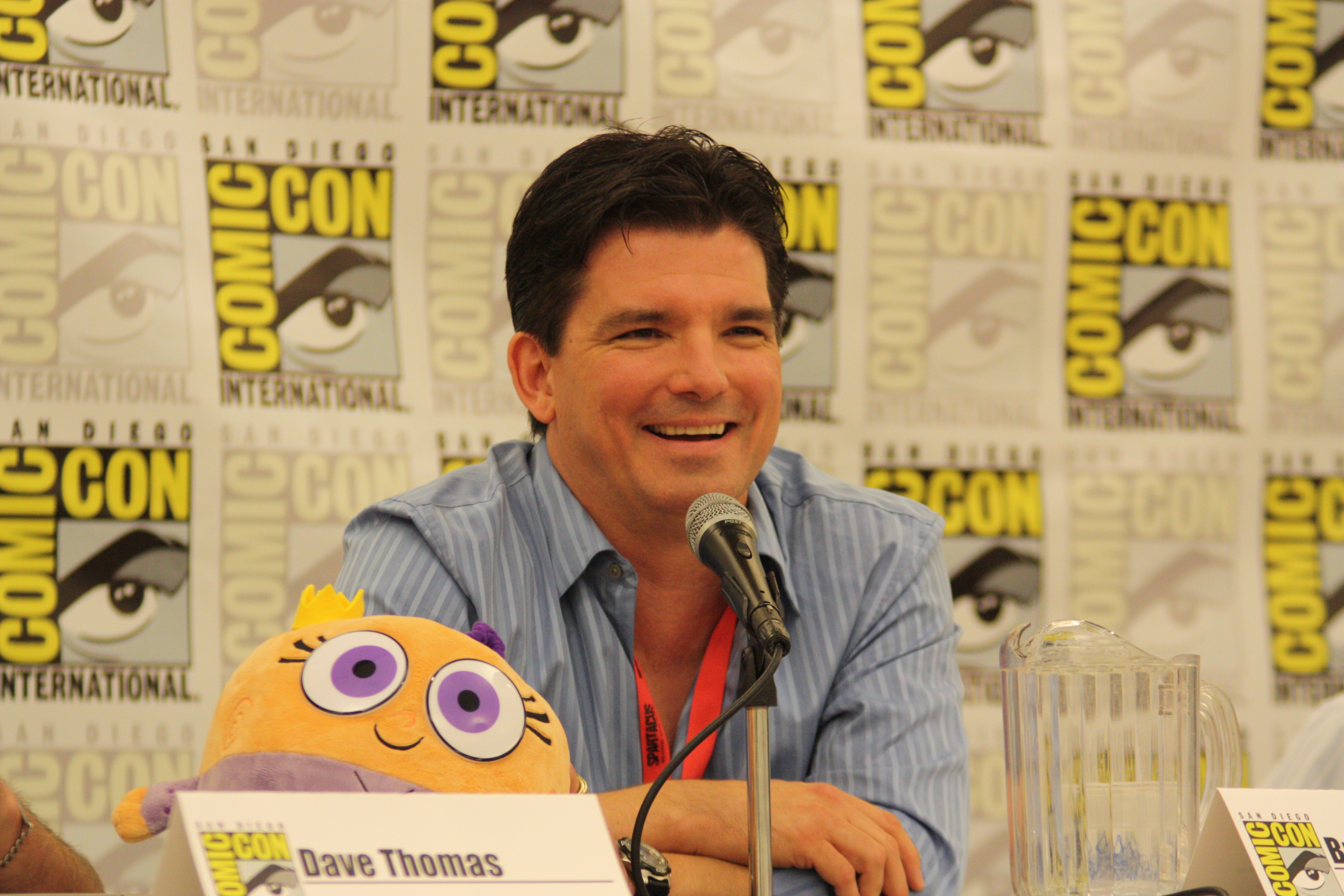
Hartman at a Fairly OddParents panel during Comic-Con 2009

His biggest success came in December 1997, when he created The Fairly OddParents. The series originally started as shorts on the anthology show Oh Yeah! Cartoons. Eventually, Nickelodeon decided to pick the shorts up as a full series. Premiering in 2001, the adapted series became a huge hit, second only in the ratings to SpongeBob SquarePants (and it briefly even passed SpongeBob's ratings). The Fairly OddParents ended production in 2016 with its final episode aired a year later afterward and is Nickelodeon's second-longest-running animated show behind SpongeBob.

Due to the success of The Fairly OddParents, Hartman was asked to create another show for Nickelodeon; Hartman says the President of Nickelodeon asked him if he had an idea, and before he could say the title, he was given the green light. The show would later become Danny Phantom. Hartman founded his own production company, Billionfold Inc., to produce the show in 2003, which he also used to produce his other projects. Danny Phantom ended production in early 2007 and amassed a cult following since its original run.

Around 2008–2009, Hartman began production of his third show for Nickelodeon, T.U.F.F. Puppy, which premiered in 2010 alongside the Jimmy Neutron spin-off Planet Sheen. The show ended five years later on Nickelodeon's spinoff network, Nicktoons.

His final show, Bunsen Is a Beast, aired on Nickelodeon and Nicktoons from 2017 to 2018. On February 8, 2018, Hartman announced on his Twitter and YouTube accounts that he had left Nickelodeon as of February 2 after a 20-year run.

=== Other works ===
In 2015, Hartman launched a "kid-safe [online] network of live shows and cartoons" called The Noog Network. The Noog Network, as well as the original YouTube channel of the same name, are both currently abandoned with no further information on if they will be re-instated.

In October 2017, Hartman launched the podcast Speech Bubble, co-hosted with his friend Jace Diehl, whom he described as the Robin to his Batman, on which he discussed pop culture. Several voice actors have appeared on the podcast, including Rob Paulsen, Tara Strong, Jerry Trainor, Grey Griffin, and Vic Mignogna. After initially posting excerpts on his primary YouTube channel, the podcast videos were later moved to their dedicated YouTube channel, now including full episodes.

In June 2018, Hartman started a Kickstarter campaign for OAXIS Entertainment, a "family-friendly" streaming service. The campaign raised $268,134, surpassing the initial goal set.

On June 22, 2019, Hartman released the animated web series HobbyKids Adventures. This series, produced by PocketWatch Inc., was created for the YouTube channel HobbyKidsTV. On 13 July, Hartman released a book, Mad Hustle, which details the ins and outs of pitching and selling a show in Hollywood.

In 2019, Hartman created the Christian animated web series The Garden, which he co-produced with his wife Julieann. Hartman planned at least two seasons of the series and to launch a subscription-based app for The Garden in late 2022. Hartman's further plans for the property include creating a VBS curriculum for churches and illustrating a children's Bible published by Thomas Nelson, titled The Garden Children's Bible, which stars the characters from The Garden and was scheduled to release in 2023. The series premiered on Pure Flix on January 1, 2023.

Hartman was credited as an executive producer on The Fairly OddParents revival series The Fairly OddParents: Fairly Odder and The Fairly OddParents: A New Wish.

== Controversies ==
In January 2018, Hartman made a joke about Tara Strong being responsible for the suicide of the original voice of Timmy Turner, Mary Kay Bergman, which attracted criticism.

In June 2018, Hartman started a Kickstarter campaign for OAXIS Entertainment, a "family-friendly" streaming service. Hartman attended a religious seminar to discuss OAXIS where Hartman claimed suicide and depression did not exist when he was younger. He also discussed incorporating Christian values into OAXIS. A number of online personalities alleged that OAXIS was deceptively planned to be a Christian-themed network. Hartman, however, asserted that, while faith would continue to be a part of his personal life, "OAXIS Entertainment is not faith-based". Hartman was also frequently asked about whether LGBTQ representation would be present on OAXIS, with Hartman remaining silent on the matter. As of 2026, Hartman has yet to give any updates on OAXIS, leading many to consider it a scam.

In January 2020, Hartman and his wife Julieann Hartman hosted a conference claiming that God healed Julieann's Fibromyalgia, alongside the ailments and conditions of many of the other panelists. These conditions included cancer, heart & kidney failure, bipolar disorder, post-traumatic stress disorder, multiple sclerosis, environmental illness, as well as autism. While the claim of curing autism originated with faith speaker Deborah M. A. McDermott, a close friend of Hartman and his wife, Hartman received criticism for promoting it, as well as lumping it in with commonly fatal conditions.

In June 2020, online artist Kuro the Artist alleged that he was not compensated for creating the animated project, "Imaginathan", despite contractual obligations. As of 2026, Hartman has yet to respond.

In February 2021, Hartman was accused of plagiarism when he published his commissioned artwork of Attack on Titan character Mikasa Ackerman, in which similarities were noted to a 2018 artwork of a Japanese artist.

== Personal life ==
As of 2025, Hartman lives in Bell Canyon, California, with his wife, Julieann, and daughters, Carly and Sophia Hartman. He also has three younger brothers. Hartman is an openly devout born-again Christian and young-Earth creationist, converting in 2000 after hearing a sermon by Frederick K. C. Price.

In 2005, Hartman, along with his wife, co-founded Hartman House, a non-profit organization which supports those in developing nations, as well as poverty-stricken areas in the United States. By 2017, Hartman House had built two homes for families in Guatemala, fed nearly 7,200 families with Thanksgiving meals in the U.S., and funded aid projects for orphanages in Uganda and Haiti. At Hartman House events, Hartman usually draws and autographs items related to his work for children.

== Filmography ==
Key
†	Denotes works that have not yet been released

=== Film ===
Year	Title	Role	Notes
1986	An American Tail		In between artist
1992	California Hot Wax	Eddie	Credited as "Shiloh Pettibone"
1994	Scooby-Doo! in Arabian Nights		Character designer
1995	Pocahontas		Video reference cast
1997	Annabelle's Wish		Storyboard artist Direct-to-video
1998	Adventures in Odyssey: Baby Daze		Storyboard artist
1998	Adventures in Odyssey: A Stranger Among Us		Storyboard artist
2006	Doogal		Writer and Voice Director (later rewritten without his knowledge, only about 3% of his script remained)
2011	A Fairly Odd Movie: Grow Up, Timmy Turner!	Maitre'd	Writer and executive producer
2012	A Fairly Odd Christmas	Christmas Caroler, GingerFred, GingerEd, GingerNed and GingerJed	Writer and executive producer
2014	A Fairly Odd Summer	Crazy Guy	Writer and executive producer
2025	A Garden Cartoon Movie: The Greatest Thing Ever!		Creator/director/executive producer/story editor/writer
2025	The Christmas King! A Garden Cartoon Movie	Delivery Man / Mr. Toothacher / Cuckoo Charlie / Various Animals	Creator/director/executive producer/story editor/writer/voice actor

=== Television ===
Year	Title	Role	Notes
1984	Match Game Hollywood Squares Hour	Contestant	
1985	Body Language	Contestant	
1985–1986	It's Punky Brewster		Models
1987	Growing Pains	Robert Jordan	Episode: "Michaelgate"
1988	Just the Ten of Us	Rod Grossman	Episode: "Close Encounters"
1988	Police Academy		Models
1988–1989	Days of Our Lives	Henry Jake	7 episodes
1989	Dink, the Little Dinosaur		Storyboard artist
1990	Piggsburg Pigs!		Key model designer
1990–1991	Generations	Sean Masters	16 episodes
1991–1993	Tom & Jerry Kids		Character designer
1993	Droopy, Master Detective		Designer
1995	What a Cartoon!		Creator: "Pfish & Chip", & "Gramps"; writer/director "Hillbilly Blue"
1996–1999	Jumanji		Storyboard artist: 3 episodes
1996–1997	Dexter's Laboratory		Storyboard artist/background designer/layout artist
1996–1998	The Spooktacular New Adventures of Casper		Storyboard artist
1996	Timon & Pumbaa		Storyboard artist: "Beast of Eden", 1 episode, credited as Elmer Hartman
1997–1999	Johnny Bravo		Storyboard artist/writer: story/director
1997	Cow & Chicken		Models/storyboard artist
1997	I Am Weasel		Models/storyboard artist
1997	101 Dalmatians: The Series		Character/storyboard design
1997	The Weird Al Show	Pizza delivery guy	Episode: "Bad Influence"
1998–2002	Oh Yeah! Cartoons		Creator: "The Fairly OddParents" and "Dan Danger"; director/producer: "Terry and Chris"; director/storyboard artist: "Zoomates"
1999–2002	Family Guy	Jonathan Weed (pilot pitch only) / Additional voices	8 episodes
1999	The New Woody Woodpecker Show		Storyboard artist: "Temper, Temper", 1 episode
2001–2017	The Fairly OddParents	Dr. Rip Studwell / Additional voices	Creator/story/writer/director/storyboard artist/voice actor/theme music composer/executive producer
2002	The Adventures of Jimmy Neutron, Boy Genius		Writer: "See Jimmy Run"
2004–2007	Danny Phantom	Football Announcer 1 (episode: "What You Want")	Creator/story/writer/storyboard artist/voice actor/director/theme music composer/executive producer
2010–2015	T.U.F.F. Puppy	Agent Weaselman / Agent Rodentski / Escape Goat / TV Voice	Creator/story/music composer/voice actor/executive producer/writer/storyboard artist/director
2010, 2013	Big Time Rush	Himself	Episode: Guest animator on "Big Time Christmas" "Big Time Cartoon"
2017–2018	Bunsen Is a Beast	Fido / Beast Ball / Pete / Memory Pete / Kitten	Creator/writer/storyboard artist/executive producer/theme music composer
2022	The Fairly OddParents: Fairly Odder		Executive producer
2024	The Fairly OddParents: A New Wish		Executive producer

=== Internet ===
Year	Title	Role	Notes
2011	Dynamice!		Creator. Animated pilot produced by Cartoon Network Studios and pitched for Cartoon Network. Butch Hartman released the pilot on his official YouTube channel on August 31, 2016.
2012	Booger Brothers!		Creator. Animated short produced by YouToon Studios for his YouTube channel.
2014	Zack 2.0		Creator/writer/director/executive producer. Live action miniseries.
2015	Booger Brothers		Creator. Animated pilot and remake of the 2012 short of the same name. Released on The Noog Network.
2016	Jet Packwell		Creator. Animated pilot.
2016	Out There!		Creator/writer/director/executive producer. Live action series.
2017	The Fairly Odd Phantom		Internet short that reunites characters from all Butch Hartman shows created for Nickelodeon
2017	Dirty Rotten Space Monsters		Creator. Animated pilot.
2017	I Think My Dad's a Superhero	Newcaster	Writer/actor. Live action short film.
2018	Elf Police		Creator. Animated pilot.
2019	Family Fusion		Creator. Animated pilot.
2019	ImagiNathan		Creator. Animated pilot.
2019	Bug Girl		Creator. Animated pilot.
2019	Dino High		Creator. Animated pilot.
2019–2020	HobbyKids Adventures	SlobbySnake (episode: "The Drawing Board")	Creator/executive producer/director/writer/designs/voice actor
2019, 2023–present	The Garden	Mr. Toothacher / Cuckoo Charlie / Employee #101 / Various Animals	Creator/story/writer/storyboard artist/director/executive producer/story editor/voice actor
2019	Lincoln High		Director/executive producer. Live action pilot.
2021	Uncle Duck		Creator. Animated pilot.
2024	The Big Blue Book	Oven Mitt	Executive producer/director/writer/lyrics by/background designer/set designer

== Written works ==
Year	Title	Publisher	ISBN	Notes	Ref.
2017	Butch Hartman: Sketchbook 1: Stuff I've drawn or am drawn to.	CreateSpace	978-1975613396	Author and illustrator	
2017	3 O'Clock Club Vol. 1: School's Out... of Control!	ROAR Comics	978-1941302583	Co-author with Jordan B. Gorfinkel	
2018	Vision: Possible!	CreateSpace	978-1727377453	Co-author with Julieann Hartman	
2020	Hannah and the Beanstalk: A True Story of Faith	Harrison House Publishers	978-1680315011	Illustrator	
2020	Mad Hustle: How to pitch & sell shows in Hollywood	CreateSpace	979-8639551123	Author	
2023	The Garden Children's Bible	Thomas Nelson	978-0785241812	Illustrator	

== Awards and nominations ==
Year	Award	Category	Work	Result
2001	Annie Awards	Outstanding Individual Achievement for Directing in an Animated Television Production	The Fairly Odd Parents("Chin Up")	Nominated
2002	Primetime Emmy	Outstanding Music and Lyrics	The Fairly Odd Parents ("Christmas Every Day")	Nominated
2002	BMI Film & TV Awards	BMI Cable Award	The Fairly Odd Parents	Won
2003	Annie Awards	Outstanding Music in an Animated Television Production	The Fairly Odd Parents	Nominated
2003	BMI Film & TV Awards	BMI Cable Award	The Fairly Odd Parents	Won
2003	Primetime Emmy Awards	Outstanding Music and Lyrics	The Fairly Odd Parents ("It's Great to Be a Guy" from "Love Struck")	Nominated
2003	Primetime Emmy Awards	Outstanding Music and Lyrics	The Fairly Odd Parents ("What Girls Love" from "Love Struck")	Nominated
2004	Annie Awards	Outstanding Achievement in an Animated Television Production	The Fairly Odd Parents	Nominated
2004	BMI Film & TV Awards	BMI Cable Award	The Fairly Odd Parents	Won
2004	BMI Film & TV Awards	BMI Cable Award	Danny Phantom	Won
2004	Primetime Emmy Awards	Outstanding Music and Lyrics	Fairly Odd Parents ("Wish Come True!" from "Abracatastrophe")	Nominated
2004	TCA Awards	Outstanding Children's Programming	Fairly Odd Parents	Nominated
2005	Annie Awards	Outstanding Writing in a Television Production	Fairly Odd Parents "Channel Chasers"	Nominated
2005	Primetime Emmy Awards	Outstanding Individual Achievement in Animation	Fairly Odd Parents ("Shelf Life")	Nominated
2006	British Academy Children's Awards	International	Fairly Odd Parents	Nominated
2007	Annie Awards	Best Animated Television Production	Fairly Odd Parents	Nominated
2009	Annie Awards	Best Storyboarding in an Animated Television Production or Short Form	Fairly Odd Parents ("Mission: Responsible")	Nominated
2010	Daytime Emmy Awards	Outstanding Writing in Animation	Fairly Odd Parents	Nominated
2013	Annie Awards	Best Animated Television Production for Children	Fairly Odd Parents ("Farm Pit")	Nominated
2013	Neox Fan Awards	Neox Fan Awards	Fairly Odd Parents	Nominated
2016	Animation Magazine	Hall of Fame	Himself	Inducted
2026	International Christian Film & Music Festival	Best Animated Film	The Garden Cartoon	Nominated
2026	International Christian Film & Music Festival	Best Animated Film	The Greatest Thing Ever! A Garden Cartoon Movie	Nominated
