= Fly (disambiguation) =

A fly is any species of insect of the order Diptera.

Flight is the process of flying.

Fly may also refer to:

== Places ==
- Fly, Ohio, U.S.
- Fly, Tennessee, U.S.
- Fly River (or the Fly), New Guinea

== People ==
=== Nickname or pseudonym ===
- Fly (artist), comic book artist and illustrator
- Fly (gamer), Israeli Dota 2 player

=== Surname ===
- C. S. Fly (1849–1901), American photographer
- Michael Fly (born 1983), American basketball coach
- Mollie Fly (née McKie, 1847–1925), American photographer
- Per Fly (born 1960), Danish film director
- William Fly (died 1726), English pirate

== Arts, entertainment, and media ==
=== Characters ===
- The Fly (Archie Comics), who first appeared in 1959, later adapted by Impact Comics
- Fly (Impact Comics), from a DC Comics imprint, loosely based on the Archie Comics character
- Fly, one of the three bugs in WordWorld
- Human Fly (character) or The Fly, a Marvel Comics character

=== Films ===
- Fly (1970 film), a short film by John Lennon and Yoko Ono
- Fly (2024 film), a documentary, directed by Christina Clusiau and Shaul Schwarz
- The Fly (1958 film), an American horror film by Kurt Neumann
- The Fly (1986 film), a remake by David Cronenberg of the 1958 film

=== Music ===
==== Groups and labels ====
- Fast Life Yungstaz, or F.L.Y, an American hip hop group
- Fly (band), an American jazz trio
- F.L.Y., a Latvian band
- Fly Records, a British record label
- The Flys (British band), an English punk band
- The Flys (American band), an American post-grunge group

==== Albums and EPs ====
- Fly (Sarah Brightman album) (1995)
- Fly (Dixie Chicks album) (1999)
- Fly (Fly album) (2004)
- Fly (EP) (2003), by Sick Puppies
- Fly (Yoko Ono album) (1971)
- Fly (Zucchero album) (2006)

==== Songs ====
- "Fly" (Nickelback song) (1996)
- "Fly" (Sugar Ray song) (1997)
- "Fly" (Jars of Clay song) (2002)
- "Fly" (Hilary Duff song) (2004)
- "Fly" (Epik High song) (2005)
- "Fly" (Blind Guardian song) (2006)
- "Fly" (Wanessa song) (2009)
- "Fly" (Nicki Minaj song) (2010)
- "Fly" (Maddie & Tae song) (2015)
- "Fly" (Avril Lavigne song) (2015)
- "Fly", by Marshmello (2018)
- "Fly", an English version of the song "Vole" by Celine Dion from Falling into You (1996)
- "Fly", by iamnot from Hope (2017)
- "Fly", by Luscious Jackson from Electric Honey (1999)
- "Fly", by Veruca Salt from American Thighs (1994)
- "Fly", by SMAP (1999)
- "Fly", by Sanctus Real from The Face of Love (2006)
- "Fly", by Faye Wong from Sing and Play (1998)
- "Fly", by Nick Drake from Bryter Layter (1979)
- "Fly", by Machiavel from New Lines (1980)
- "Fly", by Ludovico Einaudi from Divenire (2007)
- "Fly", by Moka Only from The Station Agent (2006)
- "Fly", by Monkey Majik from Thank You (2006)
- "Fly", by Lucky Daye from Spies in Disguise (2019)
- "Fly", by The Jam from All Mod Cons (1978)
- "Fly", by Sara Groves from All Right Here (2002)
- "Fly", by Sylvia Ratonel from Sylvia Ratonel (2010)
- "Fly", by MARi which represented New Hampshire in the American Song Contest (2022)
- "Fly", by Tzuyu from abouTZU (2024)
- "Fly (The Angel Song)", by the Wilkinsons (1998)

=== Radio stations ===
- Fly FM, in Malaysia
- FLY FM 89,7, in Greece
- Sirius XM Fly, a Sirius/XM station
- WFLY (FLY 92), in Albany, New York, US
- CFLY-FM (98.3 FLY FM), in Kingston, Ontario, Canada

=== Television ===
- "Fly" (Breaking Bad), an episode of Breaking Bad
- "Fly" (The Fairly OddParents: A New Wish), an episode of The Fairly OddParents: A New Wish
- Fly TV, a former digital television channel from ABC Television, Australia
- Fly Music, a defunct Spanish television channel

=== Other uses in arts and entertainment ===
- Fly! a flight simulator program for personal computers
- Fly (play), 2009, about the Tuskegee Airmen
- F.L.Y. (roller coaster), at Phantasialand
- Fly (solitaire), a card game
- Fly system, or theatrical rigging system

== Ships ==
- Fly (1772 ship)
- Fly (brig), which disappeared in 1802
- Fly (dinghy), sailing dinghy
- Fly-class brig-sloop
- HMS Fly, a list of ships of the Royal Navy

== Sports and outdoor recreation ==
- Fly (American football), a pattern run by a receiver in American Football
- Fly (exercise), a strength training exercise
- Fly (tent), the outer lining of a tent or stand-alone material shelter without walls
- Butterfly stroke or fly, a stroke in swimming
- Fly ball (baseball) or batted ball, a ball batted up into the air in baseball
- Artificial fly, a lure used in fly fishing tied to look like an insect

== Other uses ==
- Butterfly (options), also known as a fly, in finance
- Finley Airport (IATA airport code FLY)
- Fly Linhas Aéreas, a defunct brazilian airline
- Fly (carriage), a light carriage
- Fly (clothing), an opening in male garments
- Fly (pentop computer), a type of computer built into a pen
- Fly, a term in flag terminology
- Tsotsitaal language (ISO 639-3 code "fly")
- Housefly
- Striking clock fly, a mechanism employed by striking clocks to regulate speed

== See also ==
- The Fly (disambiguation)
- Flies (disambiguation)
- Flye (disambiguation)
