= Fly sheet =

A fly sheet may refer to a lightweight pamphlet or handout, such as a Flyer (pamphlet). It also may refer to:

- A lightweight horse blanket used to deter insects
- Fly (tent), the outer lining of a tent or stand-alone material shelter without walls
- The Fly Sheets, pamphlets published in the late 1840s associated with Samuel Dunn and others who advocated for reform in the Wesleyan Methodist tradition

== See also ==
- Fly (disambiguation)
