= Flies (disambiguation) =

Flies are insects of the order Diptera.

Flies may also refer to:

== People ==
- Bernhard Flies, 18th century amateur composer and doctor of medicine
- The Flies, nickname of NASA Astronaut Group 23

== Books ==
- "Flies" (Asimov short story) (1953), by Isaac Asimov
- "Flies" (Silverberg short story) (1967), by Robert Silverberg
- The Flies (1943), a play by Jean-Paul Sartre

== Music ==
- The Flies (English band), an English psychedelic pop band
- The Flys (American band), an American post-grunge group
- The Flys (British band), an English punk band
- "Flies (song)", by Death Grips from Year of the Snitch
- "Flies", by Red Fang from Only Ghosts
- Fly (Blind Guardian song), a song from the band Blind Guardian

== Film ==
- Flies (2023 film)
- Flies (2026 film)

== See also ==
- Fly (disambiguation)
- The Fly (disambiguation)
