= Flye (surname) =

Flye is a surname. Notable people with the surname include:

- Don Flye (1933–2013), American tennis player
- Edwin Flye (1817–1886), American politician, merchant, banker, bank president, and shipbuilder
- Father James Harold Flye, Episcopal priest, history teacher, and lifelong friend and mentor of James Agee
- Tom Flye, drummer for Lothar and the Hand People, an American 1960s psychedelic rock band
