= The Fairly OddParents: A New Wish =

2024 American animated series

- Genre: Adventure; Comedy; Fantasy
- Based on: The Fairly OddParents by Butch Hartman
- Developed by: Daniel Abramovici; Ashleigh Crystal Hairston; Lindsay Katai; Dave Stone
- Voices of: Ashleigh Crystal Hairston; Daran Norris; Susanne Blakeslee
- Theme music composer: Butch Hartman; Ron Jones
- Opening theme: "The Fairly OddParents: A New Wish Theme Song", arranged and produced by Chris Sernel and Grayson DeWolfe
- Ending theme: "The Fairly OddParents: A New Wish Theme Song" (instrumental)
- Composers: Caleb Chan; Brian Chan
- Country of origin: United States
- Original language: English
- No. of seasons: 1
- No. of episodes: 20

Production
- Executive producers: Daniel Abramovici; Ashleigh Crystal Hairston; Lindsay Katai; Dave Stone; Butch Hartman (Note: Despite being credited, Hartman had little involvement in the series.); Fred Seibert (Note: Despite being credited, Seibert had little involvement in the series.)
- Production location: Burbank, California
- Running time: 22–23 minutes
- Production companies: FredFilms; Billionfold Inc.; Nickelodeon Animation Studio

Original release
- Network: Nickelodeon; Netflix (international)
- Release: May 17 – August 8, 2024

Related
- The Fairly OddParents

The Fairly OddParents: A New Wish is an American animated television series developed by Daniel Abramovici, Ashleigh Crystal Hairston, Lindsay Katai, and Dave Stone. It is a reboot/revival series, but serves as a sequel to the Nickelodeon animated series The Fairly OddParents (2001–2017), created by Butch Hartman. It is the third television series in the overall franchise, ignoring the events of The Fairly OddParents: Fairly Odder (2022). The series premiered in the United States with a sneak peek on May 17, 2024, and officially premiered on May 20. The first 10 episodes were released internationally on Netflix on November 14, 2024, with the last 10 being released on June 12, 2025.

== Premise ==
Serving as a sequel to the original series and set decades after it, The Fairly OddParents: A New Wish tells the story of Hazel Wells, a 10-year-old girl who has recently moved to the city of Dimmadelphia because of her father's new job. On top of being in an unfamiliar environment, it is also the first time she has been without her older brother, Antony, who left to start college, leaving her feeling lonely and unsure of herself. All that changes when her pink-and-green-haired neighbors next door reveal themselves to be no ordinary neighbors but fairy godparents Cosmo and Wanda, who come out of retirement to become Hazel's fairy godparents.

== Voice cast ==
=== Main ===
- Ashleigh Crystal Hairston as:
  - Hazel Wells, an adventurous 10-year-old girl with unique interests and an even wilder imagination. Cosmo and Wanda leave retirement to become her fairy godparents and grant her every wish as a result of her brother Antony leaving for college, making her feel lonely.
  - Mrs. Mack, one of Hazel's teachers
  - Hazel Marionette, a ventriloquist dummy counterpart of Hazel who is often wished as a stand-in for class whenever she is out fixing problems with her fairies
  - Lezah Sllew, Hazel's anti-fairy counterpart, created when Hazel temporarily becomes a fairy in "Fairy for a Day"
- Daran Norris, reprising his roles from the original series, as:
  - Cosmo, Hazel's fairy godfather and Wanda's husband
  - Jorgen Von Strangle, the Arnold Schwarzenegger-esque chief instructor of the Fairy Godparent Academy and self-described "toughest fairy in the universe"
  - Anti-Cosmo, Cosmo's anti-fairy counterpart
- Susanne Blakeslee, reprising her roles from the original series, as:
  - Wanda, Hazel's fairy godmother and Cosmo's wife
  - Anti-Wanda, Wanda's anti-fairy counterpart

=== Recurring ===
- Jentel Hawkins as Angela Wells, Hazel's mother who is a therapist
- Asante Jones as:
  - Marcus Wells, Hazel's father who is a parascience expert
  - Not Timmy Turner, a middle-aged man shown working various jobs throughout Dimmadelphia. His appearance is a homage to adult Timmy Turner from "The Big Problem!" and was confirmed to not be the actual Timmy by showrunner Lindsay Katai.
- A.J. Beckles as Antony Wells, Hazel's older brother who left her for college
- Iris Menas (Note: menas has specified they prefer the use of lowercase letters when their name is written.) as Winn Harper, one of Hazel's friends who is non-binary, as is their voice actor
- Merk Nguyen as Jasmine Tran, one of Hazel's friends
- Marcus Montgomery as Whispers Fred, one of Hazel's classmates, who speaks quietly and makes ASMR videos
- Kyle McCarley as:
  - Devin "Dev" Dimmadome, the son of Dale Dimmadome and grandson of legendary business tycoon Doug Dimmadome. He acts antagonistic toward Hazel until the episode "A New Dev-elopment", in which they become friends. At the end of the episode "Lost and Founder's Day", after their friendship is strained following his father's deceit, Dev receives a fairy godparent of his own, the now grown-up Poof (who now goes by Peri).
  - Jenkins, one of Hazel's classmates
- JP Karliak as Dale Dimmadome, Dev's father and Doug's son. He was voiced by Dee Bradley Baker in the original series.
- Carlos Alazraqui as:
  - Mr. Jorge Guzman, Hazel's teacher
  - Stuart and Hannibal, twin brothers who live in Hazel's apartment building
  - Denzel Crocker, a deranged former elementary school teacher and one of the archenemies of Hazel's predecessor, Timmy Turner. Crocker is still obsessed with fairies and is determined to prove their existence as well as to harness their power for his personal gain. Alazraqui reprises his role from the original series.
- Grey DeLisle as:
  - Bev, one of Hazel's classmates and Dev's crush, who plays soccer and insists on calling it football
  - Mrs. Amy Krentz, Hazel's school principal
  - Mrs. Velasquez, one of Hazel's teachers
  - The Pe-Az, an intergalactic pea peace-negotiating team, wished by Hazel to get Dev to be kind (Note: The Pe-Az were originally voiced by Kyle A. Carrozza on the Nickelodeon print of the episode, but were redubbed due to him being arrested on two counts of child pornography possession in June 2024.)
  - Vicky, a former babysitter and one of Timmy Turner's archenemies, who loves torturing children through hard labor. DeLisle reprises her role from the original series.
  - The Tooth Fairy, a fairy who handles tooth-related magic and Jorgen's wife. DeLisle reprises her role from the original series.
- Eric Bauza as:
  - Trev, one of Hazel's classmates
  - Periwinkle "Peri" (formerly known as Poof), Dev's fairy godfather and the now grown-up son of Cosmo and Wanda. He was voiced by Tara Strong in the original series. Hairston stated that his name was changed from "Poof" to "Peri" because the former is a slur in many countries.
  - Elkniwirep "Irep" (formerly known as Foop), the Anti-Fairy counterpart of Peri and the now grown-up son of Anti-Cosmo and Anti-Wanda. Bauza reprises his role from the original series.
- Dawnn Lewis as Tina Churner, Dimmadelphia's news reporter
- Kyle A. Carrozza as The Pe-Az, an intergalactic pea peace-negotiating team, wished by Hazel to get Dev to be kind (Note: The Pe-Az were later re-voiced by Grey DeLisle on the Netflix print of the episode due to Carrozza being arrested on two counts of child pornography possession in June 2024.)

=== Guest ===
- Jenelle Lynn Randall as Cookie, a fairy who was originally supposed to be Hazel's fairy godmother
- Leilani Barrett as Bary, a Baryonyx that Cosmo and Wanda bring to the present day when Hazel wishes to see a real dinosaur
- Bruce Barker as Father Time, one of the most powerful beings in existence, who possesses complete control over time
- Cheryl Texiera as Nick of Time, a magical being who describes herself as a fixer, someone who arrives to save the day when people think all is lost
- Jennifer Fouché as Diana the Diva, Hazel's hair that was brought to life by Cosmo when she wished it had spirit
- Tom Taylorson as Sci, a fairy in Fairy World that focuses on science
- Robbie Daymond as Kennueth, a manga character Hazel wishes to life
- Eric Edelstein as Danky, an anthropomorphic dumpster that Hazel accidentally brings to life
- Gary LeRoi Gray as Anthony James Jr. (also known as A.J.), one of Timmy's old friends from the original series, now grown up and the founder of the Galax Institute. Gray reprises his role from the original series
- Melique Berger as Viozalia, a demi-goddess that appears as an exhibit in a museum, brought to life by Dev for a wish
- Emily Stockdale as Patty Possum, the animatronic mascot of Patty Possum's Party Playground, which Hazel wishes to life
- Y. Chang as Cupid, a fairy who casts love-related spells worldwide, now older, lazier, and bald. He was voiced by Tom Kenny in the original series.
- Alani Ilongwe as Brewster Johnson, Angela's former college crush
- Legna Cedillo as the Nmusic Phairy, a fairy responsible for music-related wishes
- Jenifer Lewis as Mother Nature, the goddess of nature
- Morla Gorrondona as Pepperlyn Monroosevelt, a ghost fairy who aspires to become a famous TV star
- Kimberly Brooks as Toothica, an obnoxious talking tooth

== Production ==
In June 2023, trademark registrations attached to Paramount Global and Nickelodeon were made. In July 2023, Daran Norris confirmed that a new Fairly OddParents project was in the works. In January 2024, an unfinished version of the first episode "Fly" was leaked.

The series was officially announced on February 23, 2024, with 20 episodes ordered for the first season. The series is produced by FredFilms, Billionfold Inc., and Nickelodeon Animation Studio in Burbank, California. The CG animation was produced by Giant Animation in Dublin.

On June 4, 2024, showrunner Lindsay Katai stated that the series' viewership on Netflix would determine an eventual second season being greenlit by Nickelodeon.

== Episodes ==
The episodes are presented in the intended narrative order as determined by the producers, rather than in their original broadcast sequence, to preserve story continuity.

No.	Title	Written by	Storyboarded by	Original release date	Prod. code	U.S. viewers (millions)
1	"Fly"	Ashleigh Crystal Hairston & Lindsay Katai	Kevin Cannarile & Lidia Garcia-Quiroga; Adriel Garcia & Shawna Mills (directors)	May 17, 2024 (sneak peek); May 20, 2024 (official)	FOP001	0.09
1	"Fly"	Ashleigh Crystal Hairston & Lindsay Katai	Kevin Cannarile & Lidia Garcia-Quiroga; Adriel Garcia & Shawna Mills (directors)	May 17, 2024 (sneak peek); May 20, 2024 (official)	FOP008	0.09
Quirky ten-year-old Hazel Wells struggles to adjust to her new life after moving to the city of Dimmadelphia and saying goodbye to her older brother, who has left for college. Her situation changes when she discovers her neighbors, Cosmo and Wanda, are retired fairy godparents disguised as humans. When Hazel wishes she could "fly" to visit her brother, they misinterpret her wish and accidentally turn her into an actual fly.
2	"The Department of Magical Violations"	James III	Johnny Koester; Nico Selma (director)	May 21, 2024	FOP002	0.08
2	"Teacher's Pal"	Neyah Barbee	Kyle A. Carrozza; Adriel Garcia (director)	May 22, 2024	FOP003	0.07
After Jorgen Von Strangle discovers that Cosmo and Wanda have come out of retirement to become Hazel's fairy godparents, he sends them and Hazel to the Fairy DMV (Department of Magical Violations) for a series of wish trials to determine whether they are a suitable match. If they fail, Hazel will be reassigned to a different fairy godparent named Cookie. Worried about fitting in at her new school, Hazel wishes to be friends with her teachers instead of her classmates. However, the wish backfires when the teachers begin acting increasingly childlike.
3	"A Dinosaur in Dimmadelphia"	James III	Angela Entzminger; Nico Selma (director)	May 23, 2024	FOP006	N/A
3	"Fearless"	Lindsay Katai	Grey White; Shawna Mills (director)	May 27, 2024	FOP004	0.10
When Hazel wishes to see a real dinosaur, Cosmo and Wanda bring their friend Bary, a Baryonyx from the Cretaceous period, to the present. Wanting Bary to find a purpose on Earth, Hazel wishes he had a job, but every position he tries ends in disaster. As a result, Dimmadelphia loses power, threatening its annual Electric Light Ice Cream Float Parade. Hazel wants to watch a scary movie with her friend Jasmine, but Jasmine is too frightened to join her. To help Jasmine overcome her fear, Hazel wishes for her to become fearless. Cosmo and Wanda grant the wish, but their magic accidentally manifests Jasmine's deepest fears as physical creatures.
4	"The Wellsington Hotellsington"	Ashleigh Crystal Hairston	Kevin Cannarile; Adriel Garcia (director)	May 28, 2024	FOP005	0.13
4	"1500 Minutes of Fame"	Neyah Barbee	Lidia Garcia-Quiroga; Shawna Mills (director)	May 29, 2024	FOP007	0.12
When Hazel invites her popular classmate, Winn Harper, to a sleepover with Jasmine, she wishes her apartment building were a luxury hotel. However, Hazel soon becomes too preoccupied with managing the hotel to spend time with her friends. Hazel wishes to become famous to win a class superlative, and Father Time grants her wish—making her famous for 1,500 minutes (25 hours). Initially enjoying the spotlight, Hazel soon monopolizes her classmates' attention, irritating Principal Krentz. Threatened with a transfer to a Hollywood school, Hazel panics and tries to speed up time to end her fleeting fame before the punishment takes effect.
5	"28 Puddings Later"	Wilder Smith	Johnny Koester; Nico Selma (director)	May 30, 2024	FOP012	0.07
5	"Trial & Hair-ror"	Kayla Renee Brooks	Kyle A. Carrozza; Adriel Garcia (director)	June 3, 2024	FOP013	0.12
After discovering that Dev hoards all the pudding on Pudding Day, Hazel wishes everyone had an unlimited supply of pudding. However, the wish backfires, turning the students into pudding-obsessed zombies. During School Spirit Week, Hazel is determined to win the "Most Spirited Hair" award. Without her mother to style it, she wishes her hair had spirit. Cosmo misinterprets the wish and brings her hair to life. Named Diana the Diva, Hazel's animated hair becomes upset when Hazel uses hair products and runs away, leaving Hazel bald. Hazel and her fairy godparents set out to find her runaway hair.
6	"Weird Science"	Alec Schwimmer	Grey White; Shawna Mills (director)	June 4, 2024	FOP011	0.08
6	"Mystery She Wished"	Alex Horab	Angela Entzminger; Nico Selma (director)	June 5, 2024	FOP009	0.06
Hazel's wish for her science fair project to succeed causes Cosmo and Wanda to rewrite the laws of science, leading to strange and chaotic effects. When Hazel has to postpone her mystery movie night with her father, she wishes she could solve a real mystery. She later becomes suspicious of a man delivering a package to their landlady and begins investigating him and his family.
7	"Prime Meridian Love"	Wilder Smith	Kevin Cannarile; Adriel Garcia (director)	June 6, 2024	FOP015	0.09
7	"Stanky Danky"	Steve Borst	Johnny Koester; Nico Selma (director)	June 10, 2024	FOP016	0.07
Feeling left out when her friends attend the school dance instead of her book club, Hazel wishes to go with Kennueth, the lead from her favorite manga, Prime Meridian Love. However, the evening goes awry when Kennueth mistakes Dev for his archrival, Duckworth. While falling asleep, Hazel accidentally brings a dumpster to life, naming it Stanky Danky. After learning about the environmental impact of human waste, Hazel brings Danky to Dimmadelphia's "Planet Palooza" festival to raise awareness. However, Dev's father, Dale Dimmadome, soon discovers Danky and puts him to work, prompting Hazel to rescue him.
8	"Peace of Pizza"	Neyah Barbee & Sammie Crowley	Kyle A. Carrozza; Adriel Garcia (director)	June 11, 2024	FOP014	0.06
8	"A New Dev-elopment"	Neyah Barbee	Lidia Garcia-Quiroga; Shawna Mills (director)	June 12, 2024	FOP010	0.08
On Kindness Day, Hazel's class will earn a pizza party if everyone performs one act of kindness. Dev refuses to participate. Hazel wishes for someone to convince Dev to be kind, prompting Cosmo and Wanda to summon the Pe-Az, an intergalactic team of pea-pod-shaped peace negotiators. However, none of their efforts succeed. Hazel and Dev are paired for a treasure hunt project, forcing them to get along. As they work together, they have fun, and Hazel discovers a softer side to the meanest kid in school.
9	"Cookie's Court"	Kayla Renee Brooks	Johnny Koester; Nico Selma (director)	June 13, 2024	FOP021	0.06
9	"Work Her Magic"	Kayla Renee Brooks	Lidia Garcia-Quiroga; Shawna Mills (director)	July 23, 2024	FOP020	0.07
Cosmo unintentionally reveals that he and Wanda are fairies, leading to their summons to Fairy Court, where Hazel becomes their lawyer. If Cosmo and Wanda plead guilty, they will be arrested, and Hazel will be reassigned to Cookie. When Hazel's mother becomes too busy with her assistant Beatrish, Hazel wishes Beatrish would quit and that she could replace her as an adult while a puppet version of herself takes her place at school. However, things go awry when the puppet starts acting strangely while Hazel has to step in for her mother at an important business meeting.
10	"Lost and Founder's Day"	James III	Grey White, Noel Belknap, Angela Entzminger & Megan Ruiz G. Shawna Mills & Nico Selma (directors)	July 22, 2024	FOP017	0.08
10	"Lost and Founder's Day"	James III	Grey White, Noel Belknap, Angela Entzminger & Megan Ruiz G. Shawna Mills & Nico Selma (directors)	July 22, 2024	FOP018	0.08
At the Founder's Day Festival, Dale Dimmadome launches an app to track and capitalize on kids' wish energy, but Hazel registers as an anomaly because of her fairy godparents. Meanwhile, amid conflict with his neglectful father and a strained friendship with Hazel, a miserable Dev is granted his own fairy godparent: a fully grown Poof, now named Peri, Cosmo and Wanda's son.
11	"Crock to the Future"	James III	Kyle A. Carrozza (Note: When the episode originally aired, Carrozza was uncredited due to being arrested on two counts of child pornography possession in June 2024. Despite this, he is credited for the episode on digital releases.); Adriel Garcia (director)	July 23, 2024	FOP022	0.07
11	"Battle of the Dimmsonian"	Wilder Smith	Kevin Cannarile; Adriel Garcia (director)	July 24, 2024	FOP019	0.09
Hazel's father eagerly attends the 96th Annual Parascience Pageant at the Galax Institute, hoping to win the prestigious "Persistence in the Face of Doubt Award." However, when Hazel's handbag—containing Cosmo and Wanda—is confiscated at the entrance, she must find a way to retrieve them without drawing attention. Reluctantly, Hazel teams up with Denzel Crocker, who is determined to restore his reputation at the Institute. When Crocker discovers Hazel's fairy godparents are real, he betrays her to capture Cosmo and Wanda. During a class sleepover at the Dimmsonian Museum, Hazel becomes suspicious when Dev exhibits mysterious wish powers. His prank to summon the ancient sorceress Viozalia backfires when she possesses their classmates. Hazel and Dev, both revealed to have fairy godparents, join forces to stop her. In the aftermath, Cosmo and Wanda reunite with their son Poof—now known as Peri—who had been assigned as Dev's fairy godparent following the events of "Lost and Founder's Day."
12	"Patty Possum's Party Playground"	Wilder Smith	Grey White & Noel Belknap; Shawna Mills (director)	July 24, 2024	FOP023	0.09
12	"A Date to Remember"	Neyah Barbee	Megan Ruiz G. Nico Selma (director)	July 25, 2024	FOP024	0.07
When Winn becomes disheartened that Patty Possum's Party Playground — their favorite childhood restaurant — has lost its charm, Hazel wishes the animatronic mascot, Patty Possum, could come to life and restore the magic. At first, the wish seems successful, but things take a turn when Patty refuses to let Hazel and Winn leave and begins chasing them through the restaurant. Meanwhile, Cosmo and Wanda struggle to retrieve their wands from a rigged claw machine. For Angela and Marcus's anniversary, Hazel wishes they could fall in love all over again — but the wish backfires when they entirely forget who she is. To fix it, Cosmo and Wanda reveal that only Cupid can rekindle true love. Hazel summons him and is challenged to a matchmaking contest to prove Angela will choose Marcus over his rival, Brewster.
13	"Lost in Fairy World"	James III	Kevin Cannarile; Adriel Garcia (director)	July 25, 2024	FOP025	0.07
13	"The Treble with Rivals"	Wilder Smith	Lidia Garcia-Quiroga; Shawna Mills (director)	July 29, 2024	FOP026	0.05
When Dev wishes to visit Fairy World, Wanda warns him to avoid the Hocus Poconos, a mysterious and forbidden area. Ignoring her warning, Dev steals Peri's wand and convinces Hazel to join him. Meanwhile, Peri argues with Cosmo and Wanda, but the three unite to track down the missing kids. Hazel and Dev eventually reach the Hocus Poconos, where they encounter the fearsome Un-Wish Dragon, who tries to eat them. Hazel discovers a rivalry between the school band and orchestra and wishes to be skilled at all instruments to audition for both. Cosmo and Wanda summon the Nmusic Phairy, who grants the wish, but Hazel's talent intensifies the feud. To resolve it, Hazel wishes the two groups had nothing to argue about — which inadvertently erases all music from Earth. Panicked, she summons the Nmusic Phairy again, who gives her a golden music note with the power to restore music. Hazel uses it to unite the band and orchestra during their concert, leading to a successful performance. Afterward, her parents surprise her with a visit from her older brother, Antony.
14	"Rattleconda Racers"	Neyah Barbee	Johnny Koester; Nico Selma (director)	July 29, 2024	FOP027	0.05
14	"Dig a Little Deeper"	Alec Schwimmer	Kyle A. Carrozza (Note: Carrozza was credited on the episode's original airing. However, on digital releases, he is uncredited due to being convicted of child pornography possession in June 2024.); Adriel Garcia (director)	July 30, 2024	FOP028	0.14
Worried that her brother Antony no longer wants to spend time with her since leaving for college, Hazel wishes to be transported with him into their favorite made-up childhood board game, Rattleconda Racers, hoping to recreate the joy of playing together. Hazel wishes to be in a cave to find an impressive rock for her school report, but ends up trapped with subterranean rock creatures.
15	"Operation: Birthday Takeback"	Wilder Smith	Grey White, Noel Belknap & Megan Ruiz G. Shawna Mills & Nico Selma (directors)	July 31, 2024	FOP029	0.06
15	"Operation: Birthday Takeback"	Wilder Smith	Grey White, Noel Belknap & Megan Ruiz G. Shawna Mills & Nico Selma (directors)	July 31, 2024	FOP030	0.06
When Vicky takes over Dev's birthday party to run a money-making scheme, Hazel stages a takedown to stop her. Meanwhile, Cosmo, Wanda, and Peri uncover that Dev's father has been secretly investigating Hazel.
16	"Potazel Potahzel"	Ashleigh Crystal Hairston	Lidia Garcia-Quiroga; Shawna Mills (director)	July 30, 2024	FOP032	0.14
16	"The Haunting of Wells House"	James III	Kevin Cannarile; Adriel Garcia (director)	August 1, 2024	FOP031	0.08
Hazel refuses to eat anything but french fries and wishes to have them for every meal. However, her wish backfires, turning her into a potato. Cosmo and Wanda summon Mother Nature, who introduces Hazel to the Mother Potato — a giant magical potato Hazel can't resist and eats entirely. To make amends, Hazel helps Mother Nature grow a new Mother Potato. While watching a scary movie with her father, Hazel encounters Pepperlyn Monroosevelt, a ghostly fairy actress who dreams of stardom. When Marcus's investigation leads to Pepperlyn's capture, Hazel, Cosmo, and Wanda enlist Jorgen's help to exorcise the spirit.
17	"Best of Luck"	Lindsay Katai	Johnny Koester; Nico Selma (director)	August 1, 2024	FOP033	0.08
17	"Hazel Wells and the Multiverse of Jenkins"	James III	Kyle A. Carrozza; Adriel Garcia (director)	August 5, 2024	FOP034	0.07
As the Rock, Paper, Scissors Tournament nears, Dev tries to cheat with a wish Peri cannot grant, causing a fallout. He then meets Foop—now Irep—and spitefully wishes Hazel to have bad luck, making her lose. After revealing Irep's role, Cosmo and Wanda battle him until Jorgen banishes Irep. Dev then orders his O-Pairs to research anti-fairies. When Dev tells Hazel that Jenkins has a crush on her, she embarrasses herself. Hazel uses magical Time Loops cereal from Father Time to rewind and redo moments but keeps messing up. After advice from Mr. Guzman to embrace awkwardness, she confesses to Jenkins that she does not like him—only to discover Dev made it all up.
18	"Growing Pains"	Neyah Barbee	Noel Belknap; Shawna Mills (director)	August 5, 2024	FOP035	0.07
18	"Fairy for a Day"	Wilder Smith	Megan Ruiz G. Nico Selma (director)	August 6, 2024	FOP036	0.06
Hazel is eager to see the new movie Gregory 6: The Puppet Master, but when she learns it's rated PG-13, she wishes to be 13 so she can go alone. Cosmo and Wanda grant the wish, triggering Fairy World's version of puberty—"Pasta Puberty." Cosmo and Wanda attend Fairy-Con, an annual Fairy World event, but Hazel is barred from entry. After sneaking in disguised, she accidentally obtains fairy status by signing a certificate, which summons Lezah, a troublesome anti-fairy who disrupts the convention.
19	"Stuck in My Head"	Kayla Renee Brooks	Kevin Cannarile; Adriel Garcia (director)	August 6, 2024	FOP037	0.06
19	"Mind the Gap"	Neyah Barbee	Lidia Garcia-Quiroga; Shawna Mills (director)	August 7, 2024	FOP038	0.08
After Hazel, Winn, and Jasmine fail a BFF quiz, Hazel fears their friendship is at risk and wishes they could enter her mind to better understand her. However, a sinister "Mind Worm" traps them there for its own nefarious purposes. When Hazel wishes to fix the gap in her teeth, the Tooth Fairy fills it but gives her a sassy talking tooth named Toothica, whose attitude soon causes trouble for Hazel.
20	"The Battle of Big Wand"	James III	Johnny Koester; Nico Selma & Adriel Garcia (directors)	August 8, 2024	FOP039	0.07
20	"The Battle of Big Wand"	James III	Johnny Koester; Nico Selma & Adriel Garcia (directors)	August 8, 2024	FOP040	0.07
After making her one-millionth wish, Hazel earns a single rule-free wish. But before she can use it, Dev and Irep overthrow Fairy World, replacing the Big Wand's power chip to favor the anti-fairies. Stripped of their magic, the fairies are imprisoned, and Dev exposes the existence of fairies to every human on Earth, plunging the world into chaos as kids make unlimited, reckless wishes. Without their magic, the fairies begin to suffer from magical build-up — a deadly condition caused by not granting wishes. Determined to save them, Hazel teams up with Antony, Winn, and Jasmine to fight back. Meanwhile, Dev discovers that even after conquering Fairy World, he still can't win his father's approval. Remembering Peri's care and realizing his actions are hurting the only one who ever truly cared about him, Dev has a change of heart. He returns the original power chip, and Hazel reinstates it just in time, restoring Fairy World and saving the fairies. Everyone on Earth has their memory of magic erased, and Dev, as punishment, loses Peri and all his memories of fairies. Ultimately, Hazel uses her rule-free wish to allow Antony, Winn, and Jasmine to keep their memories.

== Music ==
The Fairly OddParents: A New Wish

Soundtrack album
- Released: September 20, 2024
- Genre: Children's music
- Length: 39:57
- Label: Republic Records Kids & Family

Singles from The Fairly OddParents: A New Wish
- 1. "The Fairly OddParents: A New Wish Theme Song" Released: May 20, 2024; 2. "The Fairly OddParents: A New Wish Theme Song (Sped Up)" Released: July 5, 2024

Republic Records Kids & Family released a soundtrack album for the Nickelodeon animated series The Fairly OddParents: A New Wish on September 20, 2024 on music platforms. The album features a selection of 22 original songs from the show composed by Caleb Chan and has a runtime of 39 minutes and 57 seconds. Also included are the songs from the series written by Ryan Lofty and Courtney Lofty, as well as the theme song arranged and produced by Chris Sernel and Grayson DeWolfe.

Track listing

No.	Title	Writer(s)	Length
1.	"The Fairly OddParents: A New Wish Theme Song"	Chris Sernel; Grayson DeWolfe	0:30
2.	"New Yorkity York"	Courtney Lofty; Ryan Lofty	0:55
3.	"Patty Possum's Friendship Song"	Courtney Lofty; Ryan Lofty	0:47
4.	"Patty Possum's Friendship Song – Live Band"	Courtney Lofty; Ryan Lofty	1:08
5.	"Patty Possum's Friendship Song – Unhinged Chase"	Courtney Lofty; Ryan Lofty	1:04
6.	"Lovely Love Song"	Courtney Lofty; Ryan Lofty	1:12
7.	"I Love Fries"	Courtney Lofty; Ryan Lofty	0:47
8.	"Time Loops"	Courtney Lofty; Ryan Lofty	0:27
9.	"Proud of My Son – Dubstep Remix"	Courtney Lofty; Ryan Lofty	0:35
10.	"A New Wish"	Brian Chan; Caleb Chan	2:23
11.	"Fly Hazel"	Brian Chan; Caleb Chan	1:34
12.	"Teacher's Pal"	Brian Chan; Caleb Chan	2:02
13.	"Fearless"	Brian Chan; Caleb Chan	2:37
14.	"Wellsington Hotelsington"	Brian Chan; Caleb Chan	2:32
15.	"Dev Dimmadome"	Brian Chan; Caleb Chan	2:04
16.	"Fairly Heisty"	Brian Chan; Caleb Chan	1:49
17.	"Prime Meridian Love"	Brian Chan; Caleb Chan	1:58
18.	"Peri and Irep"	Brian Chan; Caleb Chan	3:15
19.	"Viozalea"	Brian Chan; Caleb Chan	2:05
20.	"Rattleconda"	Brian Chan; Caleb Chan	3:14
21.	"Love and Games"	Brian Chan; Caleb Chan	2:37
22.	"Battle of the Wands"	Brian Chan; Caleb Chan	4:12
Total length:			39:57

== Reception ==
=== Critical response ===
Ty'Kira Smalls of Common Sense Media gave the series a three-out-of-five stars, stating "Fairly OddParents: A New Wish's eccentric characters and self-aware humor are a familiar yet refreshing take on the original." John Schwarz of Bubbleblabber states, "Overall, The Fairly OddParents: A New Wish is a pretty good re-do of an already established franchise. The contemporary presentation and fresh setting should give the producers a lot to work with in what could be a decent future." Emily Tsiao of Plugged In states "The Fairly OddParents: A New Wish is mostly cute, animated fun with some good lessons about growing up."

=== Accolades ===
Year	Award	Category	Nominee(s)	Result	Ref.
2024	Velma Awards	Best New Nonbinary Cast Member	The Fairly OddParents: A New Wish, "Wellsington Hotellsington"	Won	
2025	Children's and Family Emmy Awards	Outstanding Show Open	The Fairly OddParents: A New Wish	Nominated	
2025	Kidscreen Awards	Kids Programming - Best New Series	The Fairly OddParents: A New Wish	Nominated	
2025	36th GLAAD Media Awards	Outstanding Children's Programming	The Fairly OddParents: A New Wish	Won	
2025	Irish Animation Awards	Best Animated Kids Series (over 6 years old)	The Fairly OddParents: A New Wish	Pending	
