= Velma Awards =

Awards Series

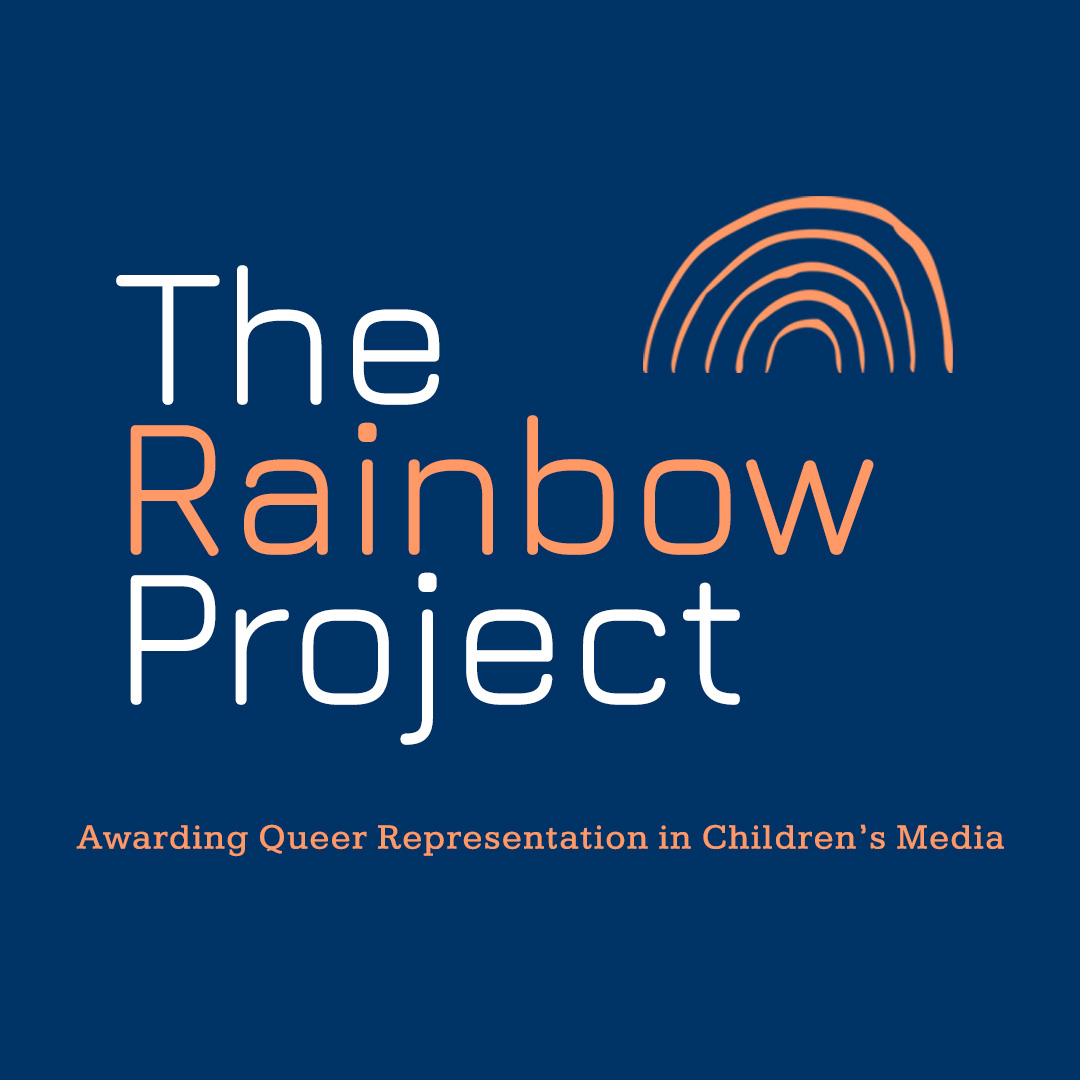
The Rainbow Project

The Velma Awards (The Velmas) are entertainment industry accolades created to recognize excellence in LGBTQ+ representation in Children's Media. The Awards were created in 2024 by children's television executives Chris Nee and Kristi Reed, along with entertainment industry executive Jeremy Blacklow, under the umbrella of their organization, The Rainbow Project.

The Velmas were first announced on December 3, 2024, with the inaugural winners announced on December 10, 2024.

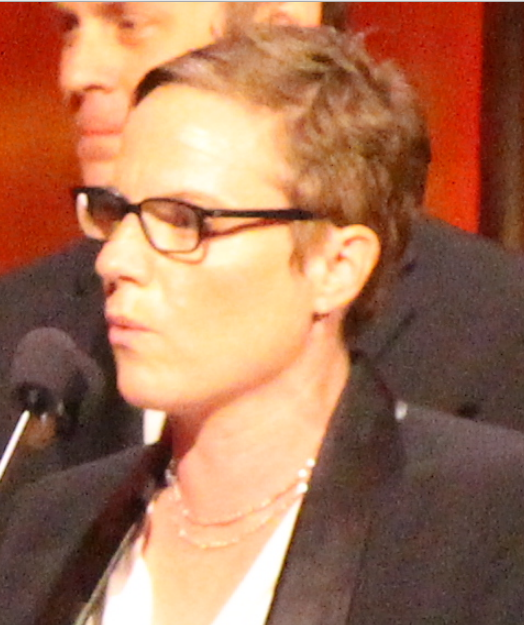
Children's television creator, Chris Nee.

The creators of The Rainbow Project founded The Velma Awards "in part to respond to the challenges within the larger awards system for kids and family content, as well as issues unique to the recognition of children’s and LGBTQ+ creators."

It is named after a Scooby-Doo character named Velma Dinkley.

== History ==
The Velmas came about as a result of Nee's, Reed's, and Blacklow's desire for a "sense of joy and celebration" for outstanding queer representation in children's media. The trio met while Nee and Reed were members of GLAAD’s Children and Families Advisory Council and Blacklow was serving as the nonprofit’s Director of Entertainment Media.

== Award categories and winners ==
14 inaugural categories and winners were announced in December 2024.

The inaugural Velma Award winners included:

- Best Exploration of Gender Expression (Winner: Fraggle Rock: Back to the Rock)
- Best Queer Relationship That's Just a Plain Ol' Relationship (Winner: Jurassic World: Chaos Theory)
- Best Queer Show You Wish Existed When You Were Growing Up (Winner: Heartstopper)
- Best Episode (Period!) That Also Never Saw the Light of Day (Winner: Moon Girl and Devil Dinosaur)
- Best Old World Show With New World Thinking (Winner: Danny Joe's Tree House)
- Best Celebration of The Complex Queer Family Tree (Winner: Firebuds)
- Best Wedding Before You and Your New Wife Go Fight Insurgents (Winner: The Dragon Prince: Mystery of Aaravos)
- Most Impressive Indie Innovator (Winner: Queer Kid Stuff)
- Best Helping My Dad Propose to My Other Dad (Winner: Let's Go Bananas)
- Best Guest Star Extravaganza (Winner: Monster High)
- Best Requited Queer Crush (Winner: Primos)
- Best New NonBinary Cast Member (Winner: The Fairly Odd Parents: A New Wish)
- Best Episode for Storytime with Drag Queens (Winner: The Bravest Knight)
- Legacy Award (Winner: Steven Universe)
