= Fast & Furious Spy Racers =

American computer-animated streaming television series

- Genre: Spy fiction; Action
- Based on: Fast & Furious by Gary Scott Thompson
- Showrunners: Tim Hedrick; Bret Haaland
- Voices of: Tyler Posey; Charlet Chung; Jorge Diaz; Camille Ramsey; Luke Youngblood; Renée Elise Goldsberry
- Theme music composer: Alex Geringas; Will Fuller
- Ending theme: "Chasing Legacy" performed by Shaylin Becton and Tha Vil
- Composers: Ryan Lofty; Jay Vincent
- Country of origin: United States
- Original language: English
- No. of seasons: 6
- No. of episodes: 52

Production
- Executive producers: Tim Hedrick; Bret Haaland; Neal H. Moritz; Vin Diesel; Chris Morgan
- Running time: 23–24 minutes
- Production companies: Universal Television; DreamWorks Animation Television

Original release
- Network: Netflix
- Release: December 26, 2019 – December 17, 2021

Fast & Furious Spy Racers is an American animated television series that premiered on Netflix on December 26, 2019, based on the Fast & Furious film series by Gary Scott Thompson. The series is executive produced by Tim Hedrick, Bret Haaland, Neal H. Moritz, Vin Diesel and Chris Morgan. Hedrick and Haaland also serve as the show's showrunners.

The sixth and final season, subtitled Homecoming, was released on December 17, 2021.

== Plot ==
=== Season 1 ===
In the opening scene, Shashi Dhar and Layla Gray hijack a high-tech yacht, stealing a car. Meanwhile, Tony Toretto races Mitch, after losing, Dominic Toretto pretends to be kidnapped, leading to Tony and his friends: Cisco Renaldo, Frostee Benson and Margaret "Echo" Pearl, to chase after him, they succeeded, leading the team to join a secret spy agency. Ms. "Janet" Nowhere, a strict and serious commander helps them investigate about SH1FT3R, the cars and the keys.

After secretly joining a dangerous underground race, they meet Shashi and Layla, only to find out that they were trying to steal another car. Tony saves Layla, gaining Shashi's trust and joining his gang (SH1FT3R). After some time, they learn that the cars are the keys to Skeleton Key, a tool that controls all of Earth's technology and anything connected to the network. After Shashi uncovers Tony and his friend's true identity, he steals a car from space and kidnaps Frostee.

Some time later, Shashi gets Skeleton Key, and uses it to track down Cleve Kalso, a man who killed his parents, after taking all of Cleve's money and giving it to the public, Cleve gets extremely angry and reveals himself. Shashi, Threatening to kill Cleve, gets interrupted by Tony, starting fight between Tony and Shashi, also unintentionally freeing Cleve. In the middle of the fight between Tony and Shashi, Tony ends up getting Skeleton Key, but Cleve threatens to blow up the whole building, so Tony saves Shashi before the building explodes, and Dominic saves Shashi and Tony from crashing but Layla escapes.

Tony and his friends trick Ms. Nowhere into thinking Skeleton Key got lost, in order for them to control the spy plane and go to vacation.

=== Season 2 ===
In Season 2, Layla became good and was secretly sent by Ms. Nowhere to Brazil. The gang went to Brazil for the mission and to save Layla, only to figure out that Layla has been mind controlled by Rafaela Moreno. So the team gets imprisoned by Rafaela but tries to escape one by one. Frostee made an antidote to block the mind control so Layla and Tony pretended to be mind controlled so that they can know her plans. She planned to mind control the whole city because they thought she was dead.

=== Season 3 ===
In Season 3, Tony and his crew make a dangerous journey to the Sahara Desert when Ms. Nowhere mysteriously disappears on a mission there, all agents uncovering a plot by a maniacal villain using remote-control weather satellites.

In Season 4, Ms. Nowhere and Tony's crew are framed for a crime they had no involvement in prior, and flee to Mexico to both find the real culprit, clear their names, and flee the unstoppable super-agent hunting them down, Palindrome.

In Season 5, the group travels to the South Pacific Ocean to rescue one of their own, leading to a faceoff with an old enemy.

In Season 6, the team returns to fighting against an old nemesis in a showdown that takes them all the way back to Los Angeles.

== Voice cast ==
=== Main ===
- Tyler Posey as Tony Toretto: The younger cousin of Dominic Toretto. He aspires to be a legend like his cousin.
- Charlet Chung as Margaret "Echo" Pearl: Tony's friend, described as a wildly talented artist and natural spy. She has green hair and ensures that their rides look great, She doesn't like being called by her real name.^{Ep. 1} Echo was inducted into a spy training course by Ms. Nowhere in Season 3, but ultimately finds she'd rather go with following her heart instead of orders.
- Jorge Diaz as Cisco Renaldo: Tony's friend who is also a mechanic, described as the muscle and the sweetheart of the crew. He enjoys food and drink; in one episode, he made sure to install cup holders everywhere in his vehicle.^{Ep. 5}
- Camille Ramsey as Layla Gray: A notable underground racer who worked for SH1FT3R and is Shashi's right-hand woman until she reformed. She prefers to be a lone wolf, and her voice has a Southern twang. Layla was recruited by Ms. Nowhere in Season 2 and has become one of the crew's most reliable allies. She is currently a member of Tony's crew as of Season 3.
- Luke Youngblood as Frostee Benson: Tony's friend, a 13-year old tech genius. He enjoys devising gadgets, flying drones, and hacking into systems. His favorite drink is Yoka and, due to his age, he is the only member of the group without his own car until season 6, when he passes his driving exam and gets his license.^{Ep. 2} Frostee is Youngblood's first voice role.
- Renée Elise Goldsberry as Ms. "Janet" Nowhere: The team's secret agent liaison. She tries to keep Tony and his crew in check and on mission.
- Manish Dayal as Shashi Dhar (main: season 1; guest: season 5): The leader of the SH1FT3R group. The Spy Racers are assigned to stop him after he is suspected to have stolen "keys" from the world's billionaires. Shashi was arrested after season 1. In season 5, he is freed by Ms. Nowhere to help Tony and the others stop Sudarikov's plan.
- Avrielle Corti as Rafaela Moreno (main: season 2–3; guest: seasons 4 & 6): The daughter of a well known crime lord who despises her current dwelling in Rio and has a mind for world domination with a mind control formula. She was taken into custody after her plans were foiled in the Season 2 finale. After Cleve Kelso broke her out of imprisonment in the beginning of Season 3, Rafaela is currently at large as of the third-season finale until she was arrested at the start of season 4.
- India de Beaufort as DANN (season 6): A super intelligent cyborg created by The Agency to help save the world from global threats. Her AI programming later becomes corrupted and now she wants to destroy the world, rather than save it due to global warming.

=== Recurring and guest stars ===
- Jimmy Tatro as Mitch: A local rival street racer, described as a bit of a knucklehead but not very brave.
- Tru Valentino as Gary: Ms. Nowhere's assistant; and Scadan, a SH1FT3R racer
- Vin Diesel as Dominic Toretto (seasons 1 & 5–6): Tony's famous cousin who recommends Tony and the gang to Ms. Nowhere. He is too visibly famous to be doing the missions himself. He makes brief appearances in the series.
  - Vin's daughter, Similce Diesel, voices Sissy Benson, Frostee's sister.
- Similce Diesel as Sissy Benson: Frostee's younger sister. She at first appears annoyed with Frostee's technological know-how, but is soon revealed to share his intellect. She also idolizes the Spy Racers and helps them on occasion, and is said to possibly join them when she's older. She also has a crush on Tony throughout the series.
- Fred Tatasciore as Sudarikov (seasons 1 & 5): An arms dealer and associate of Shashi; and Rusty (seasons 1 & 5): A guard at Shashi's estate. Both return in season 5 as the main villain and his right-hand man, respectively.
- Dave Thomas as Cleve Kelso (seasons 1, 3 & 6): A corrupt billionaire responsible for the death of Shashi's parents. Kelso returned in Season 3 as the main antagonist, and as of the third-season finale, his fate is unknown. It's revealed in Season 6, that he's now in L.A. and living in Shashi's former house. Cleve bought it after it was seized by the government once Shashi went to prison.
- Lanny Joon as Matsuo Mori (seasons 3 & 6): A man working with Cleve and Rafaela. Matsuo has a robotic arm that is linked to his nervous system, which guided his actions towards Cleve's vision. His arm is removed by Echo during the season 3 finale and he reverted to normal. He joins the Spy Racers in taking down Cleve, and his fate afterwards is unknown. It's revealed in season 6 that he's moved to the mountains of L.A. and has taken a vow of silence as repentance for his actions in season 3. He later reveals that the programming for his robotic arm, was later used as the basis for DANN's AI programming.
- Danny Trejo as Tuco (season 4): Cisco's uncle, fellow conspiracy theorist, and a famous wrestler known as the Ocelot King.
- Big Show as Palindrome (season 4–6): One of the agency's top operatives, who was tasked with bringing Ms. Nowhere and Tony's crew to justice when they are framed for a robbery. After discovering Moray's plan and helping the Spy Racers stop him, Palindrome begins a relationship with Ms. Nowhere.^{Ep. 32}
- Jason Hightower as Moray (season 4): A vengeful former member of the agency and Ms. Nowhere's ex. He frames her and the spy racers, as he seeks to make a doomsday prophecy come true with a volcano machine that could destroy most of Mexico City.

Other actors from the voice acting community have been noted to have supporting parts. They include: Carlos Alazraqui, Eric Bauza, Grey Griffin, and Kevin Michael Richardson.

== Episodes ==
=== Series overview ===
Season	Title	Episodes	Originally released
1	Los Angeles	8	December 26, 2019
2	Rio	8	October 9, 2020
3	Sahara	8	December 26, 2020
4	Mexico	8	April 16, 2021
5	South Pacific	8	August 13, 2021
6	Homecoming	12	December 17, 2021

=== Season 1: Los Angeles (2019) ===
No. overall	No. in season	Title	Directed by	Written by	Storyboard by	Original release date
1	1	"Born a Toretto"	Bret Haaland	Tim Hedrick	Leo Riley, Micah Gunnell, George Gipson, James Yang, Grace Liu, Ed Raza, Eric Pineda, Chris Staggs, Zheng Kang and Kumi Tomita Bowen	December 26, 2019
Tony Toretto races against and loses to local racer Mitch. Tony and his crew meet cousin Dom when the latter is kidnapped into a van. They evade the motorcycle pursuers and find the van where it is revealed that Dom was recommending Tony and the gang to Ms. Nowhere as a team of new secret agents that are planning to infiltrate an organization called SH1FT3R that is using street racing as a front for its criminal operations. In order to join SH1FT3R, Tony must win a secret race hosted by renowned racer Layla Gray. Tony and the gang hack the database and borrow Mitch's car to get into the race.
2	2	"Enter SH1FT3R"	Micah Gunnell	Josh Hamilton	Eric Pineda, George Gipson and Chris Staggs	December 26, 2019
Tony holds his own in the underground race, surviving attacks from Layla Gray and the other racers as well as utilizing various weapons installed in Mitch's car. Tony ties the race with Layla, which prompts her to have Tony and his crew tossed out, but Shashi Dhar, SH1FT3R's leader, decides to invites them to his after party. As Tony successfully fools Shashi as for his reasons to join SH1FT3R and tells him about a bit about his crew, Shashi offers Tony and his crew a One-time offer; Stop a rival crew led by Scadan from transporting a trailer of Yoka Spirit Water from Canada to Mexico and they can join. Despite some complications, Tony and the gang pull off the job and join SH1FT3R.
3	3	"Ghost Town Grand Prix"	James Yang	Mitch Iverson	Zheng Kang, Grace Liu and Ed Raza	December 26, 2019
Tony joins a race against Shashi, Layla, and the other SH1FT3R racers in a ghost town course through some mining tunnels. Although Tony could easily try to win the race, he is prompted by his crew to follow Shashi and Layla who are going after a different prize.
4	4	"The Owl Job"	Leo Riley	May Chan	Shawna Mills, Albert Park and Wynton Redmond	December 26, 2019
Shashi puts Tony and Layla together on a mission to steal some codes from Sudarikov, a Russian businessman and high-end arms dealer. The rest of Tony's team break into Shashi's manor in order to find the keys.
5	5	"The Celestial Vault"	Micah Gunnell	Tim Hedrick	George Gipson, Eric Pineda and Chris Staggs	December 26, 2019
Shashi uses Sudarikov's codes to unlock access to a privately-owned mountain which he and the SH1FT3Rs race up. However, during the race, Shashi reveals that Tony and his crew are traitors working for the feds, and offers a bounty to the SH1FT3Rs to knock them off the course. At the top of the mountain, Shashi retrieves a satellite which holds an exotic car which is one of the keys. He captures Frostee and escapes with him and the car.
6	6	"The Final Key"	James Yang	Josh Hamilton	Grace Liu, Zheng Kang and Ed Raza	December 26, 2019
With the overall mission being a failure, Ms. Nowhere starts packing up all the crew's things. Layla arrives and warns them that Shashi plans to collect all the key cars to enable a Skeleton Key that would allow him to hack into any electronics within range, giving him limitless power. Ms. Nowhere arrests Layla, and plans to destroy the fifth and final car which is housed at a military base. Tony offers to get Shashi the fifth car in exchange for Frostee, and they break into the military base.
7	7	"Ignition"	Leo Riley	Mitch Iverson	Shawna Mills, Albert Park and Wynton Redmond	December 26, 2019
Tony, Layla and the gang are in a spy plane with the fifth car. They evade Ms. Nowhere's pursuit, after which General Dudley arrests Ms. Nowhere and takes over operations. Tony exchanges the fifth car for Frostee. Shashi uses the cars to unlock an area that contains the Skeleton Key which is in the form of a visor mask. General Dudley and his troops arrive but Shashi uses the Skeleton Key to control the drones and vehicles to defeat them. Shashi and his crew then head to Las Vegas in order to kill the billionaire Cleve Kelso who murdered his parents.
8	8	"The Key to the Strip"	Micah Gunnell	Tim Hedrick	Josh Covey, George Gipson, Eric Pineda and Chris Staggs	December 26, 2019
Shashi uses the Skeleton Key to invade Las Vegas Strip, hack into the Western Grid, and to get revenge on Cleve Kelso. Tony and the gang rush to Vegas to try to stop him.

=== Season 2: Rio (2020) ===
No. overall	No. in season	Title	Directed by	Written by	Storyboard by	Original release date
9	1	"Escape from L.A."	James Yang	Josh Hamilton	Ed Raza, Grace Liu, Zheng Kang and Adrian Barrios	October 9, 2020
Tony and the gang are now full-fledged Spy Racers and help Ms. Nowhere capture the last of Shashi's old SH1FT3R crew, break up a massive smuggling ring and catch a criminal who had stolen a hard drive of sensitive information. Ms. Nowhere doesn't want the gang to on an international mission because she had lost one of her operatives there. However, after discovering that one of his tattoos is a formula, Gary accidentally lets the criminal escape, so the gang captures him again. Ms. Nowhere eventually allows them to go on the mission to Rio after learning that the agent she lost was their old friend Layla Gray.
10	2	"That Sinking Feeling"	Leo Riley	Ashley Soto Paniagua	Dan Duncan, Tim Maltby, Shawna Mills, Albert Park and Wynton Redmond	October 9, 2020
After shaking off the Brazilian police, the gang finds themselves in the jungle, but their vehicles get stuck in quicksand. Tony tries to take charge of the situation and not call for Ms. Nowhere's help, but this upsets Echo, who lets him figure it out on his own. Frostee and Cisco go after a monkey who has stolen the backpack of spy gear. Tony eventually apologizes to Echo and the gang regroups to pull out the vehicles and shake the police again, and eventually arrive at the outskirts of Rio.
11	3	"Bem-vindo ao Rio"	Micah Gunnell	Valeska Rodriguez	Josh Covey, George Gipson, Eric Pineda and Chris Staggs	October 9, 2020
The gang enjoys settling in the culture of Rio. Tony shows off his tattoo that has the formula in order to attract the gangsters. Soon they are escorted through the Favelas to the mansion home of the 'late' Saint Rafaela Moreno where they find Layla. Even though Tony is convinced that she hasn't flipped, Layla takes the formula then has the gangsters attack the team which forces them to go into hiding. Meanwhile, Ms. Nowhere hunts down another criminal trying to impersonate a prince.
12	4	"Combustion"	James Yang	Emma Dudley	Adrian Barrios, Grace Liu, Zheng Kang and Ed Raza	October 9, 2020
With the Moreno family gang and Layla still hunting them, Tony and Echo take cover in a safehouse while Cisco and Frostee lay low at a local home. Ms. Nowhere shows up and takes command having Echo track Layla to a warehouse outside of town where the gangsters start mass-producing the formula and Cisco learning what he can from the locals around town. Meanwhile, Frostee finds an instability in the formula which makes it extremely volatile and explosive. Can Tony and Echo save a persistent and ignorant Layla before a tanker truck worth of the formula takes out half of the Favelas and her with it?
13	5	"Driving Blind"	George Gipson	Mitch Iverson	Shawna Mills, Albert Park and Wynton Redmond	October 9, 2020
With Layla free from the Formula's influence, which just so happens to be Mind Control, Tony and his crew decide to test the potential of the formula on themselves. Meanwhile, Layla goes back undercover to expose the true ringleader of the gang; Saint Rafaela Moreno who apparently faked her death in a race 1 year ago. But Layla ends up exposing herself and the team when she wins a race through the Favelas against a Mind-Controlled mystery driver who is revealed to be Ms. Nowhere! which results in Tony and his crew being captured.
14	6	"An Echo of Nowhere"	Micah Gunnell	Tim Hedrick	Josh Covey, Eric Pineda, Chris Staggs and Ed Tadem	October 9, 2020
Tony, his crew, and Gary are locked up in the formula warehouse by Rafaela and Nowhere. In exchange for the safety of his family, Frostee agrees to Stabilize the formula, giving Echo a chance to escape and bust them out with the Hauler, which she recently learned can reconfigure its tires to drive through quicksand. Nowhere hunts for her in the jungle and Echo must resort to quick thinking and primitive tactics to defeat her. Tony and Cisco give Layla a glimpse into how they met Echo and Layla helps reassure Tony to have more trust in his family.
15	7	"The Patroness"	James Yang	Josh Hamilton	Adrian Barrios, Grace Liu, Zheng Kang and Ed Raza	October 9, 2020
With Ms. Nowhere freed from the formula, Echo heads back to the warehouse with the Hauler to save the rest of the gang. But with Frostee having stabilized the formula and with Tony and Layla under her thumb, Rafaela goes into the race hoping to wipe out the other crime family racers, then release the formula putting everyone under her control. Echo, Nowhere and the others head to the race in the Hauler to try and stop her as Tony and Layla reveal to her that Frostee created an antidote that kept them from being controlled. But their efforts to stop Rafaela fail when she releases the Formula over the crowd and orders them to kill Tony and the gang.
16	8	"Tchau, Uggos"	George Gipson	Tim Hedrick	Mio Del Rosario, Tim Maltby, Shawna Mills, Albert Park and Wynton Redmond	October 9, 2020
Rafaela controls the city and Tony's gang are trapped in the Hauler trying to come up with a plan. Rafaela goes off to rob the other crime families while Tony, Layla, Echo, and Cisco sneak out and work on catching up to her. Meanwhile, Frostee works on figuring out a way to reverse the formula's effect on the people of Rio. Tony and Layla pursue Rafaela and INTERPOL Agent Medina aboard Ms. Nowhere's Spy plane and learn that she did all of this to release her mother, the Scientist who created the Mind-Control Formula, from prison. Tony uses a tiny Pico Camera to record the confession, then Frostee uses the recording to release Tony and Layla from their restraints, capture Rafaela and free the city. The city people and Tony's team celebrate with a massive dance party.

=== Season 3: Sahara (2020) ===
No. overall	No. in season	Title	Directed by	Written by	Storyboard by	Original release date
17	1	"The Giant Haboob"	Micah Gunnell	Tim Hedrick; Emma Dudley	Josh Covey, Zheng Kang, Eric Pineda and Chris Staggs	December 26, 2020
Tony gets disappointed after Echo is chosen for spy training, but his friends try to cheer him up. Mrs. Nowhere and Gary travel to the Sahara Desert for a mission, they encounter a gaint Haboob which shuts down the spy plane's power, resulting in a crash, but luckily survive.
18	2	"The Dead End"	James Yang	Josh Hamilton	Adrian Barrios, Grace Liu, Ed Raza and Chap Yaep	December 26, 2020
19	3	"The Empty Well"	George Gipson	Emma Dudley	Shawna Mills, Albert Park and Wynton Redmond	December 26, 2020
20	4	"The Hunt"	Micah Gunnell	Mitch Iverson	Josh Covey, Zheng Kang, Eric Pineda and Chris Staggs	December 26, 2020
21	5	"The Bedouin Shield"	James Yang	Tim Hedrick	Adrian Barrios, Grace Liu, Ifesinachi Orjiekwe, Ed Raza and Chap Yaep	December 26, 2020
22	6	"The Eye of the Sahara"	George Gipson	Josh Hamilton	Jasmine Goggins, Zheng Kang, Albert Park, Wynton Redmond and Leo Riley	December 26, 2020
23	7	"RoboCleve"	Micah Gunnell	Emma Dudley	Josh Covey, Ifesinachi Orjiekwe, Eric Pineda, Chris Staggs and Yu Su	December 26, 2020
24	8	"Sirocco Fire Explosion"	James Yang	Tim Hedrick	Adrian Barrios, Grace Liu, Ed Raza, Sean Song and Seth St. Pierre	December 26, 2020

=== Season 4: Mexico (2021) ===
No. overall	No. in season	Title	Directed by	Written by	Original release date
25	1	"Chasing Phantoms"	George Gipson; Leo Riley	Josh Hamilton	April 16, 2021
26	2	"The Convoy"	Micah Gunnell	Emma Dudley	April 16, 2021
27	3	"The Fugitives"	James Yang	Lauren Otero	April 16, 2021
28	4	"That's a Moray"	George Gipson; Leo Riley	Mellori Velasquez	April 16, 2021
29	5	"The Ocelot King vs. El Mariposa"	Micah Gunnell	Joanna Lewis; Kristine Songco	April 16, 2021
30	6	"The Siege"	James Yang	Josh Hamilton	April 16, 2021
31	7	"Into the Labyrinth"	Leo Riley	Emma Dudley	April 16, 2021
32	8	"Don't Go Chasing Lavafalls"	Micah Gunnell	Tim Hedrick	April 16, 2021

=== Season 5: South Pacific (2021) ===
No. overall	No. in season	Title	Directed by	Written by	Original release date
33	1	"R.O.A.M. Around the World"	James Yang	May Chan	August 13, 2021
34	2	"The Rescue"	George Gipson	Josh Hamilton	August 13, 2021
35	3	"Anchors Away"	Micah Gunnell	Emma Dudley	August 13, 2021
36	4	"Driving and Crying"	James Yang	Tim Hedrick	August 13, 2021
37	5	"Ride and Die"	George Gipson	May Chan	August 13, 2021
38	6	"Ex Machina"	Micah Gunnell	Josh Hamilton	August 13, 2021
39	7	"The Takeover"	James Yang	Emma Dudley	August 13, 2021
40	8	"The Toretto Virus"	George Gipson	Tim Hedrick	August 13, 2021

=== Season 6: Homecoming (2021) ===
No. overall	No. in season	Title	Directed by	Written by	Original release date
41	1	"Incineration Day"	Micah Gunnell	Josh Hamilton	December 17, 2021
42	2	"Snowed In"	James Yang	Kyel White	December 17, 2021
43	3	"Rafaela's Raf-venge"	George Gipson	Emma Dudley	December 17, 2021
44	4	"Fun on the Autobahn"	Micah Gunnell	Josh Hamilton	December 17, 2021
45	5	"Detonation"	James Yang	Emma Dudley	December 17, 2021
46	6	"Meltdown"	George Gipson	Tim Hedrick	December 17, 2021
47	7	"Hollywood Beginning"	Micah Gunnell	Josh Hamilton	December 17, 2021
48	8	"Dann Hunt"	James Yang	Emma Dudley	December 17, 2021
49	9	"Wildcat"	George Gipson	Tim Hedrick	December 17, 2021
50	10	"Oil and Water"	Micah Gunnell	Kyel White	December 17, 2021
51	11	"Say Goodbye to Hollywood"	James Yang	Josh Hamilton	December 17, 2021
52	12	"Say Goodbye to Hollywood"	George Gipson; Bret Haaland	Tim Hedrick	December 17, 2021

== Production ==
On April 23, 2018, it was announced that Netflix had given the production a series order. Executive producers are set to include Tim Hedrick, Bret Haaland (The Penguins of Madagascar, Kung Fu Panda: Legends of Awesomeness and All Hail King Julien), Neal H. Moritz, Vin Diesel and Chris Morgan. Hedrick and Haaland are also expected to act as showrunners. Productions companies involved with the series include DreamWorks Animation. The series comes after the acquisition of DreamWorks Animation by NBCUniversal which includes a first look at DreamWorks Animation animated series based on Universal Pictures film properties. Cast members were announced on November 18, 2019.

== Release ==
Fast & Furious Spy Racers was released on Netflix on December 26, 2019. A world premiere red carpet event was held at the Universal Cinema in Los Angeles on December 7. The second season was released on October 9, 2020. The third season was released on December 26, 2020. The fourth season was released on April 16, 2021. The fifth season was released on August 13, 2021. The sixth and final season titled as Homecoming was released on December 17, 2021.

== Reception ==
The review aggregator website Rotten Tomatoes reported an 86% approval rating, based on 7 reviews, with an average rating of 7.3/10.

== Video game ==
In May 2021, DreamWorks Animation and Universal announced that a game based on the Netflix series is in the works titled Fast & Furious Spy Racers: Rise of SH1FT3R by 3D Clouds and Outright Games. It was published on November 5, 2021. The game tells an original story separate from the series and has 17 tracks based in locations from the series, including Los Angeles, Rio de Janeiro, the Sahara Desert, and the South Pacific. On April 22, 2022, a DLC pack subtitled "Arctic Challenge" was released, featuring new tracks located in Alaska, four new vehicles, and two additional playable characters.

== Notes ==
- "Ep." is shortened form for episode in the Fast & Furious Spy Racers series
