= The Fly =

The Fly may refer to:

== Film and theatre ==
- The Fly (1958 film), an American science-fiction horror film by Kurt Neumann
- Return of the Fly, a 1959 sequel of the 1958 film
- Curse of the Fly, a 1965 British sequel
- The Fly (1968 film), a Yugoslavian cartoon by Vladimir Jutrisa and Aleksandar Marks
- The Fly (1980 film), a Hungarian animated short film by Ferenc Rofusz
- The Fly (1986 film), a remake by David Cronenberg of the 1958 film
- The Fly (2008 film), a Russian film by Vladimir Kott
- Eega, a 2012 Indian Telugu-language fantasy action film
- The Fly (opera), a 2008 opera by Howard Shore, based on the 1986 film
- "The Fly" (Alien: Earth), a 2025 episode of the TV series Alien: Earth

== Music ==
- "The Fly" (Chubby Checker song), 1961
- "The Fly" (U2 song), 1991
- The Fly, an import compilation CD by Rush
- "The Fly", a song by Sarah Brightman

== Print media ==
- The Fly (magazine), free British music magazine
- Fly (Archie Comics), also called Fly Man
- Human Fly (character), a Marvel Comics character, the first of whom was also known as The Fly

== Short stories and adaptations ==
- "The Fly" (Mansfield short story), 1922 short story by Katherine Mansfield
- "The Fly" (Langelaan short story), a 1957 short story by George Langelaan

== Sports ==
- The Fly (climb), a climbing route
- Guy Williams (basketball) (born 1960), American basketball player, nicknamed "The Fly"

== Other ==
- Drosophila melanogaster, the (best-studied) fly
- "The Fly" (poem), a 1794 poem by William Blake
- The Fly, an Atari 2600 game
- The Fly (roller coaster), a roller coaster at Canada's Wonderland
- The Fly (lake), Otsego County, New York
- Mohamed Amra (born 1994), French criminal nicknamed "The Fly"
- Mike Pence's fly, also called "the fly"

== See also ==
- Fly (disambiguation)
- Flies (disambiguation)
