= The Morning Watch =

1951 short autobiographical novel by James Agee

- Author: James Agee
- Language: English
- Genre: Fiction
- Published: 1951 (Houghton Mifflin)
- Publication place: United States
- Media type: Print (hardcover)
- Pages: 120 pp

The Morning Watch is a short autobiographical novel which author James Agee began writing in 1947. Completing the text in 1950, Agee wrote to John Huston that the protagonist was a "12-year-old boy (roughly myself) at edge of puberty, peak of certain kinds of hypersensitive introversion, isolation, and a certain priggishness."

== Plot ==
The Morning Watch explores the thoughts and feelings of 12-year-old Richard, a student at an unnamed Episcopal boarding school (based on Agee's schooling at St. Andrew's-Sewanee School in Sewanee, Tennessee), over the course of a few hours in the early morning of Good Friday in 1923. Part I opens with Richard waking up to participate in the 4 AM shift of a nightlong prayer vigil in the school's chapel; in Part II he goes to the chapel, prays, and decides to attend the 4:30 shift as well; in Part III he leaves the chapel at 5 AM with two other boys, and they all run off to swim in the lake rather than go straight back to their dormitory, knowing they will be punished for this infraction. On their way to the lake, Richard discovers the intact shed skin of a locust, clinging to a tree; at the lake, the boys swim and then kill a snake; as they head back to school, Richard takes the locust shell with him.

== Editions ==
The text of The Morning Watch first appeared in the Rome-based literary journal Botteghe Oscure in 1950 and was published by Houghton Mifflin the following year. Subsequent editions include Ballantine Books (1966), Avon Books (1980), and Library of America (2005).
