= Fly (The Fairly OddParents: A New Wish) =

- The Fairly OddParents: A New Wish episode
- Title card
- Episode no.: Season 1 Episode 1
- Directed by: Adriel Garcia; Shawna Mills
- Written by: Ashleigh Crystal Hairston; Lindsay Katai
- Production code: 101
- Original air date: May 17, 2024
- Running time: 22 minutes

Episode chronology
← Previous —	Next → "The Department of Magical Violations"

"Fly" is the series premiere of The Fairly OddParents: A New Wish. "Fly" originally aired in the United States as a sneak peek on May 17, 2024, on Nickelodeon, and later aired officially on May 20. In this episode, Hazel tries to run away from home to get to her brother Antony, only to realize her next-door neighbors were fairy godparents in disguise.

== Plot ==
Quirky ten-year-old Hazel Wells is unpacking her new room, welcoming her rock collection to her new home in Dimmadelphia. She is saddened by her older brother Antony’s absence after leaving for college, but tried to make the best of the move before pretending one of her rocks is a fairy godmother who grants wishes. Her parents Angela and Marcus enter the room, asking if she needed help unpacking. She denies their help and tells the rock that she would only make one wish: wanting her brother back.

Suddenly, the doorbell rings, and Hazel is greeted by Cosmo and Wanda (disguised as humans) at the door presenting themselves as her new neighbours. The Wellses greet the two, as Cosmo hands Angela a welcome basket containing items they used their magic to fill. The Wellses welcome the couple inside their home as they get further acquainted with each other. Angela informs them she is a therapist who has published many books and gives one to Cosmo. Hazel starts to notice suspicious behavior from the two and tries to alert her parents, but they don't notice. Marcus explains he is a parascience expert. This alerts the couple as they leave after feeling uncomfortable. Hazel turns the subject around and her parents embrace Hazel's maturity.

The next day, Hazel started her first day of school at the Dimmadelphia Enrichment Academy, feeling confident with herself. She enters the class and introduces herself, afterwards being mocked by Dev Dimmadome, the grandson of business tycoon Doug Dimmadome. Later at lunch, Dev approaches Hazel as he introduces himself and gives her a synopsis of the students in the school.

Hazel returns to her building where Cosmo and Wanda are looking through mail as Hazel returns to her apartment. Upon receiving news that Antony was forced to cancel his trip due to a storm and now will be unable to visit until the holidays, she begrudgingly packs her bags and attempts to run away from home. In the lobby, she is halted by Cosmo and Wanda, after informing them of her situation Hazel decides that she is going to go see Antony herself. Upon seeing how much Hazel is in distress the couple conclude that she needs them to help her. They attempt to stop her from leaving. After failing to get anywhere, she wishes to be able to fly to Antony herself, activating Cosmo and Wanda's magic and accidentally turning her into a literal fly.

She questions Cosmo and Wanda, and they reveal themselves to be retired fairy godparents masquerading as humans. As they're distracted, Hazel makes another run for it, where she stopped at the smell of french fries at a nearby restaurant, where she stops to eat them. They use the french fries to lead her back to the apartment and capture her in a jar.

They head to Hazel's apartment as they try to turn Hazel back. Wanda distracts her parents as Cosmo tries to change Hazel back to normal. Hazel gets caught in a Venus flytrap gifted to her parents by Cosmo and Wanda, where she meets an ant named Toni. Toni explains how she ended up in the flytrap and although she may get temporarily separated from her colony, they understand that they need to let her be free to live her own life. Toni’s words enlighten Hazel as she realizes that she needs to allow Antony his freedom to do the same. Hazel flies them both to safety, where Cosmo catches them in the jar. She wishes to return to her human form and bids Toni farewell.

Later, Hazel visits Cosmo and Wanda's apartment to apologize, only to be astonished by their home. They explain that the hallway is in Dimmadelphia while the apartment is in Fairy World so they could try living life as humans without giving up the comforts of home. The couple asks her if they could be Hazel's fairy godparents as she accepts the deal, and they make it official.

== Voice cast ==
- Ashleigh Crystal Hairston as Hazel Wells, Lady
- Daran Norris as Cosmo, Dad with Baby
- Susanne Blakeslee as Wanda, Toni the Ant
- Jentel Hawkins as Angela Wells
- Asante Jones as Marcus Wells, Bus Driver
- A.J. Beckles as Antony Wells
- Kyle McCarley as Dev Dimmadome
- Carlos Alazraqui as Mr. Guzman
- Marcus Montgomery as Whispers Fred
- Merk Nguyen as Jasmine Tran
- Grey DeLisle as Bev
- Iris Menas (Note: menas has specified they prefer the use of lowercase letters when their name is written.) as Oates
- Frank Garcia-Hejl as Man

== Production ==
In June 2023, trademark registrations attached to Paramount Global and Nickelodeon were made. In July 2023, Norris confirmed that a new Fairly OddParents project was in the works. In January 2024, an intermediate version of this episode was leaked.

== Reception ==
The episode received 0.09 million viewers on its premiere. John Schwarz of Bubbleblabber rated the episode a 6.5 out of 10, calling it a great reestablishment of the franchise.
