= Ridley Jones =

American animated preschool children's television series

- Season 1 promotional poster
- Genre: Preschool; Musical; Adventure; Fantasy comedy
- Created by: Chris Nee
- Directed by: John Musumeci; Rob Byrne
- Voices of: Iara Nemirovsky; Iris Menas; Tyler Shamy; Ashlyn Madden
- Theme music composer: Chris Nee; Christopher Dimond; Michael Kooman
- Composers: Jérôme Leroy; Layla Minoui
- Countries of origin: United States; Ireland
- Original language: English
- No. of seasons: 5
- No. of episodes: 35 (53 segments)

Production
- Executive producers: Chris Nee; Cathal Gaffney; Darragh O'Connell
- Producers: Theresa Mayer; PeeDee Shindell
- Animators: Francesco Malin; Abhishek Srivastav; Shradha Tripathy
- Editors: Thomas Byrne; Beth Elston
- Running time: 27–28 minutes
- Production companies: Laughing Wild; Brown Bag Films; Netflix Animation Studios

Original release
- Network: Netflix
- Release: July 13, 2021 – March 6, 2023

Ridley Jones is an animated preschool musical fantasy television series created and executive produced by Chris Nee for Netflix. The series premiered on July 13, 2021. A second season debuted on a November 2 release. A third season was released on February 15, 2022. A fourth season was released on August 22, 2022. A fifth and final season was released on March 6, 2023. The series was cancelled, mainly as a reaction to the introduction of a non-binary character, along with others.

== Plot ==
The series is set in a world similar to Night at the Museum with key elements shared between the two.

The series takes place in a museum where the exhibits and displays come to life via magic. The Jones family, who live inside a treehouse at the center of the building, have been an adventurer and the latest candidate for the position is Ridley, who only recently learned about the exhibits coming to life.

As Ridley continues to earn her role, she gathers a group of other museum display models to help contain the chaos and care for those who need it. Everyone is happy, without the outside world learning about the museum's secrets.

== Controversy and cancellation ==
The series generated controversy after the release of the eighth episode of the fifth and final season, "Happy Herd Day", which centers on a bison named Winifred (voiced by Iris Menas) who comes out as non-binary and asks to be called Fred. This episode angered a large number of people subscribed to the streaming platform, who claimed that it was "LGBT indoctrination". Netflix responded to user feedback by canceling the series after its fifth and final season.

== Voice cast ==
=== Main ===
- Iara Nemirovsky as Ridley Jones, a young girl who is an adventurer in the museum who goes on adventures with her museum exhibit friends.
- Iris Menas as Fred, a non-binary bison display model and a friend of Ridley.
- Tyler Shamy as Dante, a parasaurolophus display model in a blue knit cap and a friend of Ridley. Dante speaks in skater lingo and typically carries and rides a skateboard.
- Ashlyn Madden as Ismat, a young mummy and a friend of Ridley. She holds the distinction of being the only group member other than Ridley to have relatives revealed onscreen, those being 2 fathers.
- David Errigo Jr. as Dudley, a dodo bird display model and a friend of Ridley. According to an interview, Errigo based the voice for Dudley on legendary actor and comedian Ed Wynn, albeit without Wynn's trademark lisp.
- Laraine Newman as Peaches, a replica model of Ham, the astrochimp who was the first great ape in space and a friend of Ridley.
- Reggie Watkins as Tibby, a fossil Triceratops who is adopted by Ridley.

=== Supporting ===
- Sutton Foster as Sarah Jones, Ridley's mother.
  - Foster also voices Mrs. Sanchez, a large blue whale display model who hangs from the museum's ceiling.
- Blythe Danner as Sylvia Jones, Ridley's grandmother.
- Chris Nee as Ma
- Bob Bergen as Pa
  - Bergen also voices Mr. Filbert Peabody, the greedy museum curator who cares only about profiting from the museum exhibits and feeling the need to interfere in the business of others. As a result, while the Jones family respects him, they rarely tolerate his behavior and actions.
- Sydney Mikayla as Penelope "Penny" Peabody, Filbert's niece.

=== Minor ===
- Sander Argabrite provides the vocal effects of Pedro, a young penguin display model who idolizes Ridley.
- Jane Lynch as Lonny, the museum's well-meaning but clumsy security guard. In Season 5 she now knows about the Jones family's secret.
- Laraine Newman as Luann
- Dave Boat as Nukilik "Nuki", a Woolly Mammoth display model and Sylvia's best friend during her youth. Nukilik was frozen in the arctic exhibit several years before he was rediscovered by Ridley, at which point he reunited with Sylvia.
- Gisela Adisa as Stella

== Episodes ==
=== Series overview ===
Series overview
Season	Segments	Episodes	Originally released
1	12	6	July 13, 2021
2	9	5	November 2, 2021
3	8	4	February 15, 2022
4	9	5	August 22, 2022
5	15	15	March 6, 2023

=== Season 1 (2021) ===
No. overall	No. in season	Title	Directed by	Written by	Original release date
1	1	"Ready or Not, Here I Come"	John Musumeci	Chris Nee	July 13, 2021
1	1	"Some Like It Hot"	Rob Byrne	Story by : Chris Nee; Teleplay by : Jeff King	July 13, 2021
Ready or Not, Here I Come: Ridley discovers that the Museum comes to life at night. Some Like It Hot: After Pedro goes to the dessert exhibit to go on an adventure like Ridley, the gang must save Pedro out of the exhibit before he gets in danger. Songs: "I'm Ready" and "The Eyes of the Museum"
2	2	"Fly Like an Eagle"	Rob Byrne	Story by : Chris Nee; Teleplay by : Jeff King	July 13, 2021
2	2	"My Dinner with Ismat"	Rob Byrne	Jeff King	July 13, 2021
Fly Like an Eagle: My Dinner with Ismat: Songs: "One of a Kind" and "My Two Dads and Me"
3	3	"Un-Fit for a Queen"	John Musumeci	Isabel Galupo	July 13, 2021
3	3	"Peaches, We Have a Problem"	John Musumeci	Lisa Kettle	July 13, 2021
Un-Fit for a Queen: Peaches, We Have a Problem: Songs: "Royally Afraid" and "Rise Above"
4	4	"The Taming of the Tail"	Rob Byrne	Lisa Kettle	July 13, 2021
4	4	"Tunnel Vision"	John Musumeci	Lisa Kettle	July 13, 2021
The Taming of the Tail: Tunnel Vision: Songs: "The Tale of Me and My Tail" and "Way Too Different to Get Along"
5	5	"Ridley's Babysitter Club"	John Musumeci	Gabrielle Meyer	July 13, 2021
5	5	"Riddle Me This"	Rob Byrne	Laura Sreebny	July 13, 2021
Ridley's Babysitter Club: Riddle Me This: Songs: "Museum Lullaby" and "The Riddle of the Sphinx"
6	6	"A Knight's Tale"	Rob Byrne	Gabrielle Meyer	July 13, 2021
6	6	"Dudley's Inferno"	John Musumeci	Lisa Kettle	July 13, 2021
A Knight's Tale: Dudley's Inferno: Songs: "You're a Hero" and "Goodbye"

=== Season 2 (2021) ===
No. overall	No. in season	Title	Directed by	Written by	Original release date
7	1	"Bison Ball"	John Musumeci	Chris Nee	November 2, 2021
7	1	"Dude, Where's Our Egg?"	Rob Byrne	Jeff King	November 2, 2021
Bison Ball: Fred finds the perfect outfit to feel like themselves for the museum prom. Dude, Where's Our Egg?: Dudley and Dante find an egg and compete to see who'll be the best big brother. Songs: "Inner Me" and "My Little Bro"
8	2	"Northern Lights"	Rob Byrne	Kent Redeker	November 2, 2021
8	2	"Slow Place Like Home"	Anna Margiotta	Mia Resella	November 2, 2021
Northern Lights: Ridley meets her grandma's furry friend and turns a bummer day around with beautiful lights. Slow Place Like Home: The Eyes try to make a group of sloths feel at home. Songs: "Can't Let a Bummer Let You Down" and "Make You Feel at Home"
9	3	"A Stamp for Mama"	John Musumeci	Gabrielle Meyer	November 2, 2021
9	3	"Fred Steps Up"	Rob Byrne	Lisa Kettle	November 2, 2021
A Stamp for Mama: Ridley and her mama team up on a mission to fix an Aztec artifact. Fred Steps Up: Fred takes charge and herds a group of butterflies to the pollination exhibit. Songs: "My Greatest Quest" and "Lead the Herd"
10	4	"Compass Eye of the Storm"	Rob Byrne	Jeff King & Chris Nee	November 2, 2021
While Ridley waits for her own Compass Eye, Mr. Peabody causes the museum's magic to get messy and kicks off crazy storms throughout the exhibit. Songs: "I'm So Ready", "I'm Not Ready" and "I'm Ready (Reprise)"
11	5	"The Trailblazers"	Rob Byrne	Lisa Kettle	November 2, 2021
11	5	"Moles Shall Overcome"	John Musumeci	Kent Redeker	November 2, 2021
The Trailblazers : Ridley learns to accept a helping hand during a desert journey with a statue. Moles Shall Overcome: The Eyes make sure the moles don't lose their home to Mr. Peabody's plans. Songs: "It's All Me" and "Stand as One"

=== Season 3 (2022) ===
No. overall	No. in season	Title	Directed by	Written by	Original release date
12	1	"Peaches Beyond the Infinite"	John Musumeci	Kent Redeker	February 15, 2022
12	1	"A Quiet Chase"	Rob Byrne	Jen Bardekoff	February 15, 2022
Peaches Beyond the Infinite: Ridley and pals suit up in astronaut gear to find a lost exhibit in outer space. A Quiet Chase: The Eyes must keep quiet while looking for a drum-loving mouse friend. Songs: "The Beauty of Outer Space", "Bog Is a State of Mind" and "The Eye of the Museum (Remix)".
13	2	"Rocket Monkey"	Rob Byrne	Story by : Jeff King; Teleplay by : Johnny LaZebnik	February 15, 2022
13	2	"Masked Mayhem"	John Musumeci	Kent Redeker	February 15, 2022
Rocket Monkey: Peaches learns to ask for back-up during a mission to space. Masked Mayhem: Strange things start to happen when Mr. Peabody and Lonny try on alive masks from a new exhibit, because of the curse. Songs: "Along for the Ride" and "Do What's Right"
14	3	"Art of the Steal"	Anna Margiotta	Lisa Kettle	February 15, 2022
14	3	"Gift of the Mummy"	John Musumeci	Story by : Jeff King; Teleplay by : Ford Riley	February 15, 2022
Art of the Steal: Ridley runs into trouble after sneaking a priceless portrait out of the storage before Mr. Peabody finds it. Gift of the Mummy: Ismat tries to find the perfect gift for her dads' anniversary but learns that their gift is her. Songs: "Art of the Steal", "The Greatest Gifts" and "The Greatest Gifts (Reprise)"
15	4	"The Good, The Bad and The Chuck Wagon"	Rob Byrne	Lisa Kettle	February 15, 2022
15	4	"Annie-Place But Here"	John Musumeci	Jeff King	February 15, 2022
The Good, The Bad and The Chuck Wagon: Ridley goes treasure hunting in an old mine to save her family's treehouse before Mr. Peabody gets rid of it. Annie-Place But Here: Ridley and her mom try to find a new home for their museum's greeting robot, Annie. Songs: "Home" and "Change Can Be Good"

=== Season 4 (2022) ===
No. overall	No. in season	Title	Directed by	Written by	Original release date
16	1	"Museum Misunderstanding"	John Musumeci	Mia Resella	August 22, 2022
16	1	"Nuki Finds a Home"	Rob Byrne	Kent Redeker	August 22, 2022
Songs: "That's What I Heard" and "Where This Mammoth Belongs"
17	2	"All Ismat's Eve"	John Musumeci	Mia Resella	August 22, 2022
17	2	"Dastardly Derples"	Rob Byrne	Kent Redeker	August 22, 2022
Songs: "Mummy Thunder" and "Keeping It Real"
18	3	"The Termite-ator"	Rob Byrne	Jackie Lebovits	August 22, 2022
18	3	"Birds of Paradise"	John Musumeci	Mia Resella	August 22, 2022
Songs: "For the Greater Good" and "Welcome to Our Island"
19	4	"Escape Tomb"	Rob Byrne	Mia Resella	August 22, 2022
19	4	"Dante the Daredevil"	Anna Margiotta	Story by : Jeff King; Teleplay by : Ford Riley	August 22, 2022
Songs: "Tough Like You" and "On the Hunt"
20	5	"Heart of the Museum"	John Musumeci	Jeff King & Chris Nee	August 22, 2022
Songs: "Me!" and "All of You"

=== Season 5 (2023) ===
No. overall	No. in season	Title	Directed by	Written by	Original release date
21	1	"Jones to the Future"	Rob Byrne John Musumeci	Chris Nee Jeff King	March 6, 2023
Ridley travels to the past to change the present but accidentally alters the future. Time to go back and fix it -- fast! Songs: A Hero Again, Boom, Choose To Be A Team and It's Okay
22	2	"Ms. Peabody, I Presume?"	Anna Margiotta	Gabrielle Meyer	March 6, 2023
Mr. Peabody's nice Penny is visiting the museum for the night. She seems nice, but can she be trusted with all the museum's secrets? Songs: "Now I See"
23	3	"Flight School Dropout"	Anna Margiotta	Lizzie Prestel	March 6, 2023
When a cooler, more confident Dudley dives headfirst into a dangerous mission, Ridley and the Eyes follow him to the Arctic to make sure he's OK. Songs: "Cool Like Me"
24	4	"Dudley's Jurassic Rescue"	Rob Byrne	Kent Redeker	March 6, 2023
Dante leads the team on a dino-tastic adventure: freeing a mama stegosaurus' tail from a fallen rock and rescuing her stolen egg from rascally raptors! Songs: "Totally Jurassic"
25	5	"Lonny's Ready!"	John Musumeci	Jackie Lebovits	March 6, 2023
Security guard Lonny joins the gang on a mission to find a missing gem. She's making mistakes, but that's OK. Nobody's perfect! Songs: "Nobody's Perfect"
26	6	"Makin' Waves"	Anna Margiotta	Jen Bardekoff	March 6, 2023
Shiver me timbers! Ridley and the gang make a feisty new crew of friends when the museum opens up the Queen Barnacle, a life-sized pirate exhibit. Songs: "Oceans Away"
27	7	"Ismat's Cat-tashtrophe"	Anna Margiotta	Jen Bardekoff	March 6, 2023
Songs: Love Gets Bigger
28	8	"Happy Herd Day"	Rob Byrne	Story by : Chris Nee & Jen Bardekoff; Teleplay by : Mia Resella & Jen Bardekoff	March 6, 2023
Songs: The Truest You
29	9	"Dino Versus Dodo"	John Musumeci	Kent Redeker	March 6, 2023
Songs: Drop the Beat
30	10	"Ready, Pet, Go"	Anna Margiotta	Jackie Lebovits	March 6, 2023
Songs: Family
31	11	"Mummy Makeover"	Anna Margiotta	Ivory Floyd	March 6, 2023
Songs: I'll Be Me
32	12	"Peaches' Space Race"	Rob Byrne	Story by : Kent Redeker & Jeff King; Teleplay by : Laura Sreebny	March 6, 2023
Songs: Enjoy the Ride
33	13	"Pedro Busts a Move"	John Musumeci	Story by : Jen Bardekoff; Teleplay by : Joey Clift	March 6, 2023
Songs: No Matter Where You Are
34	14	"Ridley's Christmas Carol"	Rob Byrne	Chris Nee & Jen Bardekoff	March 6, 2023
Songs: Mr. Peabody's Glorius and Wonderful (and Trademarked) Christmas Carol, The Joy of Christmas, Peabody's Near Epiphany and The Joy of Christmas (reprise)
35	15	"Game of Jones"	John Musumeci	Kent Redeker	March 6, 2023
Songs: I'll Take What's Mine and That's What Heroes Do

== Production ==
The series was first announced in October 2020.

== Release ==
Ridley Jones was released on Netflix on July 13, 2021. A trailer was released on June 8.
