= Fly (1772 ship) =

History

Great Britain
- Name: Fly
- Builder: Liverpool
- Launched: 1772
- Renamed: Tartar (1780)
- Fate: Last listed 1794

General characteristics
- Tons burthen: 190, or 200 (bm)
- Armament: 1781:12 × 6-pounder guns

Fly was a ship launched in 1772 in Liverpool. She then made three voyages to Africa as a slave ship. Circa 1780 she was renamed Tartar. She then made six more slave trading voyages. From circa 1789 she became a local trader. She was last listed in 1794.

== Fly ==
Fly became a slave ship, making three slave-trading voyages. Missing volumes of Lloyd's Register (LR) and missing pages in extant volumes mean that Fly first appeared in LR in 1776. LR was only as accurate as shipowners bothered to inform it of changes; consequently the data was stale, or even inaccurate.

1st Fly slave voyage (1772–1773): Captain William Batty sailed from Liverpool on 6 August 1772. Fly gathered her slaves at Benin and took them to Jamaica. She sailed from Jamaica on 2 October 1773 and arrived back at Liverpool 26 November. She had left with 45 crew members and the database reports, somewhat improbably, that the she had suffered 45 crew deaths on the voyage.

2nd Fly slave voyage (1774–1775): Captain Batty sailed from Liverpool on 2 April 1774. Fly acquired her slaves in Benin and delivered 240 to the British Caribbean. She landed some at St Vincent and the remainder at St Kitts. She arrived back at Liverpool on 28 July 1775.

Year	Master	Owner	Trade	Source & notes
1776	William Batty; Thomas Blundell	James	Liverpool–Africa	LR

3rd Fly slave voyage (1776–1777): Captain Thomas Blundell sailed from Liverpool on 1 May 1776. Fly acquired her slaves at Anomabu and arrived at Grenada in 1777. She sailed from Grenada on 4 April 1777 and arrived back at Liverpool on 22 June 1777.

Year	Master	Owner	Trade	Source & notes
1780	T.Blundell	James	Liverpool–Africa	LR

The entry carried the remark "Now the Tartar Houghton".

== Tartar ==
Missing pages in the 1780 volume of LR mean that Tartar first appeared there in the 1781 volume, with the note that she had been Fly.

Year	Master	Owner	Trade	Source & notes
1781	J.Houghton	Wilding	Liverpool–Africa	LR; large repair 1781

1st Tartar slave voyage (1780–1781): Captain John Houghton sailed from Liverpool on 5 August 1780. Tartar acquired her saves at the Banana Islands and left Africa on 3 March 1781. She arrived at St Eustatius in April with 430 slaves. she arrived back at Liverpool on 26 June. She had left Liverpool with 48 crew members and she suffered 10 crew deaths on her voyage.

2nd Tartar slave voyage (1781–1782): Captain Houghton sailed from Liverpool on 12 September 1781, bound for West Africa. Tartar arrived at Kingston on 4 April 1782, with 500 slaves. She had embarked 602. She sailed from Kingston on 25 April and arrived back at Liverpool on 29 July. She had left Liverpool with 47 crew members and she suffered four crew deaths on her voyage.

3rd Tartar slave voyage (1782–1783): Captain William Mashiter sailed from Liverpool on 4 November 1782, bound for West Africa. Tartar arrived in Jamaica in July 1783 with 528 slaves. She left on 7 August and arrived back at Liverpool on 28 October. She had left with 46 crew members and had five crew deaths on her voyage.

4th Tartar slave voyage (1784–1785): Captain Mashiter sailed from Liverpool on 10 May 1784. She acquired her slaves at Bonny Island and New Calabar and arrived at Kingston on 20 October with 432 slaves. She sailed from Kingston on 7 December and arrived back at Liverpool on 3 February 1785.

A report in Lloyd's List states that while Tartar was gathering slaves her ship's tender was totally lost on the bar at Cape Mount. Also Tartar's "first boat" was plundered of 12 slaves.

5th Tartar slave voyage (1785–1787): Captain Archibald Dalziel sailed from Liverpool on 8 September 1785, bound for the Bight of Benin. She embarked 360 slaves and arrived at Dominica with 240 on 2 March 1787. She left Dominica on 28 May and arrived back at Liverpool on 29 June. She had left with 37 crew members and she suffered 15 crew deaths on the voyage.

6th Tartar slave voyage (1787–1788): Captain John Hughes sailed from Liverpool on 26 September 1787. Tartar arrived in the British Caribbean on 8 September 1788. When she arrived at Barbados she was described as "late Hughes"; Hughes had died on 11 August. John Phillips replaced Hughes as master. Tartar returned to Liverpool 8 January 1788. She had left Liverpool with 41 crew members and she suffered 23 crew deaths on her voyage.

Tartar's owners had purchased her in September 1787. At the same time they purchased a small, two-masted schooner of 10 tons (bm), that they named Little Tartar. She role was to act as a tender to Tartar. The owners sold her on the coast of Africa and on 17 June 1789 gave up her certificate of registration. Clearly, Tartar's sixth enslaving voyage was not a success. On her return to Liverpool her owners sold her and new owners sailed her between Liverpool and Ireland.

Year	Master	Owner	Trade	Source & notes
1790	T.Hughes; C.M'Gill	Backhouse; Montgomery	Liverpool–Africa; Liverpool–Larne	LR; large repair 1781
1794	C.M'Gill	Montgomery	Liverpool–Larne	LR; large repair 1781

== Fate ==
Tartar was last listed in 1794.
