= Finley Airport =

Airport in Finley, Australia

- IATA: FLY; ICAO: YFIL

Summary
- Location: Finley, New South Wales
- Elevation AMSL: 380 ft / 116 m
- Coordinates: 35°39′31″S 145°33′42″E
- Interactive map of Finley Airport

Runways
Direction	Length		Surface
Direction	ft	m	Surface
05/23	2,952	900	Asphalt

Finley Airport (IATA:FLY, ICAO:YFIL) is an airport operating out of Finley, New South Wales.

== Facilities ==
The airport has one runway made of asphalt, and with a total length of 900 m (2952 ft) and an approximate heading of 05/23.
