= James Agee =

American writer (1909–1955)

- Agee in 1937
- Born: James Rufus Agee; November 27, 1909; Knoxville, Tennessee, U.S.
- Died: May 16, 1955 (aged 45); New York City, U.S.
- Education: Harvard University (BA)
- Spouses: Via Saunders (m. 1933; div. 1938) Alma Mailman (m. 1938; div. 1941) Mia Fritsch (m. 1946)
- Children: 4, including Joel
- Writing career
- Notable works: A Death in the Family, Let Us Now Praise Famous Men

- Images
- portrait
- portrait
- portrait

James Rufus Agee (/ˈeɪdʒiː/ AY-jee; November 27, 1909 – May 16, 1955) was an American novelist, journalist, poet, screenwriter and film critic. In the 1940s, writing for Time, he was one of the most influential film critics in the United States. His autobiographical novel, A Death in the Family (1957), won the author a posthumous 1958 Pulitzer Prize. Agee is also known as a co-writer of the book Let Us Now Praise Famous Men and as the screenwriter of the film classics The African Queen and The Night of the Hunter.

== Early life and education ==
Agee was born in Knoxville, Tennessee, to Hugh James Agee (1878–1916) and Laura Whitman (née Tyler) Agee Wright (1885–1966), at Highland Avenue and 15th Street, which was renamed James Agee Street, in what is now the Fort Sanders neighborhood. When Agee was six, his father was killed in an automobile accident. From the age of seven, Agee and his younger sister, Emma, were educated in several boarding schools. The most prominent of these was near his mother's summer cottage two miles from Sewanee, Tennessee. Saint Andrews School for Mountain Boys was run by the monastic Order of the Holy Cross affiliated with the Episcopal Church. It was there that Agee's lifelong friendship with Episcopal priest Father James Harold Flye, a history teacher at St. Andrew's, and his wife, Grace Eleanor Houghton, began in 1919. As Agee's close friend and mentor, Flye corresponded with him on literary and other topics throughout his life and became a confidant of Agee's soul-wrestling. He published the letters after Agee's death. The New York Times Book Review called The Letters of James Agee to Father Flye (1962) "comparable in importance to F. Scott Fitzgerald's 'The Crackup' and Thomas Wolfe's letters as a self-portrait of the artist in the modern American scene."

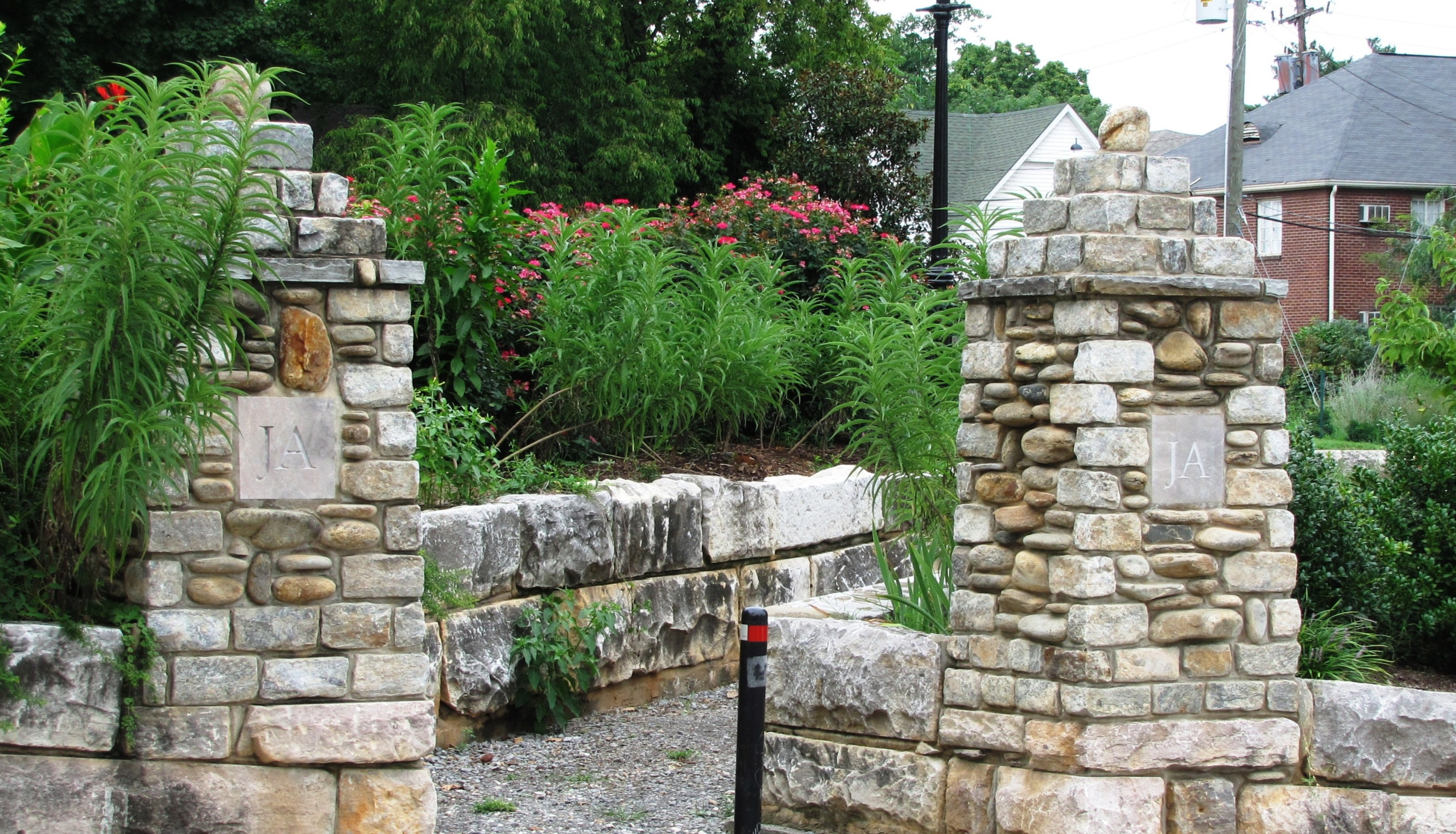
James Agee Park in the Fort Sanders neighborhood of Knoxville, Tennessee. Knoxville was Agee's childhood home and the setting for his novel A Death in the Family.

Agee's mother married St. Andrew's bursar Father Erskine Wright in 1924, and the two moved to Rockland, Maine. Agee went to Knoxville High School for the 1924–25 school year, then traveled with Flye to Europe in the summer, when Agee was 16. On their return, Agee transferred to a boarding school in New Hampshire, entering the class of 1928 at Phillips Exeter Academy. Soon after, he began a correspondence with Dwight Macdonald.

At Phillips Exeter, Agee was president of The Lantern Club and editor of the Monthly, where his first short stories, plays, poetry and articles were published. Despite barely passing many of his high school courses, Agee was admitted to Harvard College's class of 1932, where he lived in Thayer Hall and Eliot House. At Harvard, Agee took classes taught by Robert Hillyer and I. A. Richards; his classmate in those was the future poet and critic Robert Fitzgerald, with whom he later worked at Time. Agee was editor-in-chief of the Harvard Advocate and delivered the class ode at his commencement.

== Career ==
After graduation, Agee was hired by Time Inc. as a reporter, and moved to New York City, where he wrote for Fortune magazine from 1932 to 1937, although he is better known for his later film criticism in Time and The Nation. In 1934, he published his only volume of poetry, Permit Me Voyage, with a foreword by Archibald MacLeish.

In the summer of 1936, Agee spent eight weeks on assignment for Fortune with photographer Walker Evans, living among sharecroppers in Alabama. Fortune did not publish his article, but Agee turned the material into his 1941 book Let Us Now Praise Famous Men. It sold only 600 copies before being remaindered. Another manuscript from the same assignment discovered in 2003, titled Cotton Tenants, is believed to be the essay submitted to Fortune editors. The 30,000-word text, accompanied by photographs by Walker Evans, was published as a book in June 2013. John Jeremiah Sullivan wrote, "This is not merely an early, partial draft of Famous Men, in other words, not just a different book; it's a different Agee, an unknown Agee. Its excellence should enhance his reputation." A significant difference between the works is the use of original names in Cotton Tenants; Agee assigned fictional names to the subjects of Famous Men to protect their identity.

Agee left Fortune in 1937 while working on a book, then, in 1939, he took a book reviewing job at Time, sometimes reviewing up to six books per week; together, he and his friend Whittaker Chambers ran "the back of the book" for Time. In 1941, he became Time's film critic. From 1942 to 1948, he worked as a film critic for The Nation. Agee was an ardent champion of Charlie Chaplin's then unpopular film Monsieur Verdoux (1947), since recognized as a classic. He was a great admirer of Laurence Olivier's Henry V and Hamlet, especially Henry V. He also was an ardent champion of D. W. Griffith's The Birth of a Nation, which he lavishly praised for its stylistic innovations and virtuosity without critically commenting on its celebration of the Ku Klux Klan. Agee was often disappointed in films because he saw their great potential. In 1947 he wrote: " ... few American films ever manage really to specify a character or a situation so that either can achieve personal life or general applicability; people merely dance their way, more or less ingratiatingly, through a sequence of windy generalizations. They are not by any fat chance intended to be confused with any persons living or dead or who might ever possibly have lived." Agee on Film (1958) collected his writings of this period. Three writers listed it as one of the best film-related books ever written in a 2010 poll by the British Film Institute.

In 1948, Agee quit his job to become a freelance writer. One of his assignments was a well-received article for Life Magazine about the silent movie comedians Charles Chaplin, Buster Keaton, Harold Lloyd and Harry Langdon. The article, Comedy's Greatest Era, has been credited for reviving Keaton's career. As a freelancer in the 1950s, Agee continued to write magazine articles while working on movie scripts; he developed a friendship with photographer Helen Levitt.

=== Screenwriting ===
In 1947 and 1948, Agee wrote an untitled screenplay for Charlie Chaplin, in which the Tramp survives a nuclear holocaust; posthumously titled The Tramp's New World, the text was published in 2005. The commentary Agee wrote for the 1948 documentary The Quiet One was his first contribution to a film that was completed and released.

Agee's career as a movie scriptwriter was curtailed by his alcoholism. Nevertheless, he is one of the credited screenwriters on two of the most respected films of the 1950s: The African Queen (1951) and The Night of the Hunter (1955).

His contribution to Hunter is shrouded in controversy. Some critics have claimed that the published script was written by the film's director, Charles Laughton. Reports that Agee's screenplay for Hunter was not used have been proved false by the 2004 discovery of his first draft, which although 293 pages in length, contains many scenes included in the film that Laughton directed. Laughton seemed to have edited great parts of the script because it was too long. While not yet published, the first draft has been read by scholars, most notably Jeffrey Couchman of Columbia University. He credited Agee in the essay, "Credit Where Credit Is Due". Also false were reports that Agee was fired from the film. Laughton renewed Agee's contract and directed him to cut the script in half, which Agee did. Later, apparently at Robert Mitchum's request, Agee visited the set to settle a dispute between the star and Laughton. Letters and documents in the archive of Agee's agent Paul Kohner bear this out; they were documented by Laughton's biographer Simon Callow, whose BFI book about The Night of the Hunter sets this part of the record straight. Couchman, the author of a 2009 book about The Night of the Hunter, writes that Agee's screenplay would have been a film about six hours long, so Laughton had to cut and edit a considerable part of it.

== Personal life ==
Soon after graduation from Harvard University, he married Olivia Saunders (aka "Via") on January 28, 1933; they divorced in 1938. Later that same year, he married Alma Mailman. They divorced in 1941, and Alma moved to Mexico with their year-old son Joel to live with Communist politician and writer Bodo Uhse. Agee began living in Greenwich Village with Mia Fritsch, whom he married in 1946. They had two daughters, Julia (1946–2016, known throughout life as Deedee) and Andrea, and a son, John.

== Death ==
In 1951 in Santa Barbara, Agee, a hard drinker and chain-smoker, suffered a heart attack; on May 16, 1955, he was in Manhattan when he suffered a fatal heart attack in a taxi cab en route to a doctor's appointment. He was buried on a farm he owned at Hillsdale, New York, property still held by Agee descendants.

== Legacy ==
During his lifetime, Agee enjoyed only modest public recognition. Since his death, his literary reputation has grown. In 1957, his novel A Death in the Family (based on the events surrounding his father's death) was published posthumously and in 1958 won the Pulitzer Prize for fiction. In 2007, Michael Lofaro published a restored edition of the novel using Agee's original manuscripts. Agee's work had been heavily edited before its original publication by publisher David McDowell.

Agee's reviews and screenplays have been collected in two volumes of Agee on Film. There is some dispute over the extent of his participation in the writing of The Night of the Hunter.

Let Us Now Praise Famous Men has grown to be considered Agee's masterpiece. Ignored on its original publication in 1941, the book has been placed among the greatest literary works of the 20th century by the New York University School of Journalism and the New York Public Library. It was the inspiration for the Aaron Copland opera The Tender Land. David Simon, journalist and creator of acclaimed television series The Wire, credited the book with impacting him early in his career and influencing his practice of journalism.

The composer Samuel Barber set sections of "Descriptions of Elysium" from Permit Me Voyage to music, composing a song based on "Sure On This Shining Night". In addition, he set prose from the "Knoxville" section of A Death in the Family in his work for soprano and orchestra titled Knoxville: Summer of 1915. "Sure On This Shining Night" has also been set to music by composers René Clausen, Z. Randall Stroope, and Morten Lauridsen.

In late 1979, the filmmaker Ross Spears premiered his film AGEE: A Sovereign Prince of the English Language, which was later nominated for an Academy Award for Best Documentary Feature and was awarded a Blue Ribbon at the 1980 American Film Festival. AGEE featured four of James Agee's friends—Dwight Macdonald, Robert Fitzgerald, Robert Saudek, and John Huston—as well as the three women to whom James Agee had been married. In addition, Father James Harold Flye was a featured interviewee. President Jimmy Carter speaks about his favorite book, Let Us Now Praise Famous Men.

The Man Who Lives Here Is Loony, a one-act play by Knoxville-based songwriter and playwright RB Morris, takes place in a New York apartment during one night in Agee's life. The play has been performed at venues around Knoxville, and at the Cornelia Street Cafe in Greenwich Village.

== Works ==
=== Poetry ===
- 1934 Permit Me Voyage, in the Yale Series of Younger Poets
- 1935 Knoxville: Summer of 1915, prose poem later set to music by Samuel Barber.

=== Books ===
- 1941 Let Us Now Praise Famous Men: Three Tenant Families, Houghton Mifflin
- 1951 The Morning Watch, Houghton Mifflin
- 1957 A Death in the Family (posthumous; stage adaptation: All the Way Home)
- 1958 Agee on Film
- 1960 Agee on Film II
- 1962 Letters of James Agee to Father James Harold Flye
- 1968 The Collected Poems of James Agee (ed. Robert Fitzgerald)
- 1968 The Collected Short Prose of James Agee (ed. Robert Fitzgerald)
- 2001 Let Us Now Praise Famous Men, Violette Editions, 2001, ISBN 978-1-900828-15-4.
- 2005 Let Us Now Praise Famous Men, A Death in the Family, & Shorter Fiction (Michael Sragow, ed.) (Library of America, 2005) ISBN 978-1-931082-81-5. Stories include "Death in the Desert", "They That Sow in Sorrow Shall Reap" and "A Mother's Tale".
- 2005 Brooklyn Is: Southeast of the Island: Travel Notes, (Jonathan Lethem, preface) (Fordham University Press, 2005) ISBN 978-0-8232-2492-0.
- 2005 Film Writing and Selected Journalism: Uncollected Film Writing, 'The Night of the Hunter', Journalism and Book Reviews (Michael Sragow, ed.) (Library of America, 2005) ISBN 978-1-931082-82-2.
- 2005 Agee, James, Michael A. Lofaro, and Hugh Davis. James Agee Rediscovered: The Journals of Let Us Now Praise Famous Men and Other New Manuscripts. Knoxville: University of Tennessee.
- 2013 Cotton Tenants: Three Families, Melville House

=== Articles ===
- "James Agee". The Nation.

=== Screenplays ===
- 1948 The Tramp's New World, screenplay for Charlie Chaplin
- 1951 The African Queen, screenplay from C. S. Forester novel
- 1952 Face to Face (The Bride Comes to Yellow Sky segment), screenplay from Stephen Crane story
- 1955 The Night of the Hunter, screenplay from Davis Grubb novel

== See also ==
- Agee (film)
