= James Harold Flye =

American Episcopal priest (1884–1985)

James Harold Flye (October 17, 1884 – April 14, 1985) was an American Episcopal priest. He was a mentor and long-time correspondent of the writer James Agee.
