= Ryan Lofty =

- Birth name: Ryan Loftsgaarden
- Born: May 19, 1988 (age 37); Cedar Rapids, Iowa, U.S.
- Genres: Electronic Music
- Occupations: Producer; Composer; Songwriter
- Instruments: Trumpet; Piano; Guitar; Drums
- Years active: 2015–present
- Website: ryanlofty.com

Ryan Loftsgaarden (born May 19, 1988), commonly known by his stage name Ryan Lofty, is an American producer, composer and songwriter.

== Career ==
=== Early beginnings ===
Lofty was introduced to piano and trumpet at a young age by his mother, who is a piano teacher. A near-death accident at the age of 15 inspired him to pursue music as a career. He studied music business at Columbia College Chicago during which time he held an internship at a small record studio. After college Lofty worked as a composer at Disney's creative campus in Los Angeles eventually leaving to facilitate a songwriting contract in India. Throughout this period he performed with multiple groups including a national tour as drummer with indie-electronic duo Bestfriends.

=== 2015–2017 ===
In 2015 Lofty debuted his solo project, releasing four singles and one remix over the course of the summer. His single The Mountain (feat. Bonx) won Insomniac Events' Discovery Project with the award of a one-hour DJ set at Life Is Beautiful (music festival) in Las Vegas, opening the stage for Felix Jaehn, Robin Schulz, and Porter Robinson. On the day, Lofty performed a surprise collaboration with Bill Nye the Science Guy who was booked to speak at the event about climate change. The appearance was covered in major electronic music blogs and after the festival Yahoo! Music named Lofty one of "Five Rising Acts to Watch".

In early 2016 Lofty released eight-track album Tourists from the Future which featured American Idol alumni Casey Abrams and Mansions on the Moon vocalist Ted Wendler. The album contains heavy lyrical references to space and time travel which are recurring themes in Lofty's music. Popular music blog EARMILK called the album a "cosmic pool party" with "nothing but good vibes", and singled out track Dimensions (feat. Casey Abrams) as an example of Lofty's focus on melody. Global Dance Electronic (GDE) called the album a "cinematic experience" and dubbed the genre "tropi-galactic" – a play on Lofty's blend of tropical house and space themes.

Shortly after release Lofty performed in the capacity of an official artist at SXSW and Beyond Wonderland SoCal.

=== 2018–present ===
In 2018, Lofty announced a collaboration with composer Jay Vincent, writing electronic music and songs for DreamWorks Animation's Harvey Street Kids, a Netflix Original series based on characters from the legacy Harvey Comics franchise. In an interview with Animation Magazine, Lofty and Vincent discussed writing and producing the songs featured in the show, voiced by guest stars Nick Lachey, Joey Fatone, Joey McIntyre and Shawn Stockman. The duo are co-composing another series for DreamWorks Animation that features electronic music genres such as “future bass, dubstep, grime, jungle, drum & bass, complextro and... riddim.”

In 2019 the pair co-composed DreamWorks Animation's Cleopatra in Space and Netflix's Fast & Furious: Spy Racers, an animated spinoff of the blockbuster Universal franchise. Lofty previewed the Spy Racers score at CTNX Animation Expo ahead of the series premiere.

=== Licensing ===
Lofty's single The Mountain (feat. Bonx) has been featured on television programs such as E!’s Dash Dolls and MTV's Real World: Go Big or Go Home. Higher (feat. Bestfriends) was featured on Season 14 of Bad Girls Club. An unreleased track from collaborative project BabeWave was licensed in an Apple Music Guided Tour and on season three of Daredevil. Lofty has also completed custom work for brands such as Mountain Dew, Microsoft and Los Angeles Kiss Football via Future Vega, a publishing house he co-founded.
