= Iris Menas =

American actor (born 1990)

iris menas (born July 20, 1990) (Note: menas prefers the use of lowercase letters when their name is written.) is an American actor. Zie (Note: menas uses the neopronouns zie/hir.) is best known for appearing as Anybodys in the 2021 film adaptation of West Side Story and hir voice roles in the Monster High reboot, Madagascar: A Little Wild, Ridley Jones, and the Fairly OddParents reboot.

== Early life ==
During hir youth, menas attended the Kansas Dance Academy in Wichita, Kansas, for twelve years. Zie graduated from Wichita East High School in 2008. In 2012, menas graduated from University of Oklahoma, earning a BFA from the Weitzenhoffer Family College of Fine Arts. While attending school, menas was part of a production of a musical named "A Chorus Line," in May 2010, where zie played Diana Morales, with dance professor Lynn Cramer calling the performance "outstanding...insightful and genuine."

== Career ==
In 2022, menas voiced Frankie Stein in the rebooted Monster High television show. Later, menas voiced Odee Elliot in Madagascar: A Little Wild, and Fred in Ridley Jones. Fred is the "first nonbinary series regular on a preschool television program," with menas saying it is "a really interesting tool to use an animal because we have nothing to project on an animal in terms of gender," adding that there is "something so beautiful about boiling something down for a child to understand."

In 2021, menas became known for appearing in West Side Story. PinkNews called it "powerful win" for trans representation, with menas hoping that the film would have a positive impact on audiences, adding that everyone needs to be a "little more open and a little more compassionate toward one another." The film was banned in Saudi Arabia and Kuwait, while Bahrain, United Arab Emirates, Qatar, and Oman requested cuts to scenes with menas' performance, which 20th Century Studios and Disney declined to do, with the film not airing in those countries either.

In September 2021, menas noted that performances they had done for Jagged Little Pill, on Broadway, had resulted in PTSD and called proposed plans for better portrayal of trans and nonbinary characters "NOT enough," adding in a social media post, fellow actors, and hirself, were "asking for basic care and we are [being] gaslit."

In the 2024 Fairly OddParents reboot The Fairly OddParents: A New Wish, menas voiced Winn Harper. In November 2024, menas won a Velma Award for Best New Nonbinary Cast Member for the portrayal.

In 2025, menas voiced Nova in an episode of WondLa. The following year, menas voiced Harmony in an episode of Cartoon Cartoons.

== Personal life ==
menas is transmasculine and non-binary and lives in Brooklyn, New York, as of March 2022.

== Selected filmography ==
List of iris menas film and television credits
Year	Title	Role	Notes
2020, 2022	Madagascar: A Little Wild	Odee Eliot (voice)	2 episodes
2021	West Side Story	"Anybodys"	
2021–2023	Ridley Jones	Fred (voice)	35 episodes
2022	Way Down	Alex	2 episodes
2022–2024	Monster High	Frankie Stein, Carrots, Mystery Meat, Dragon Girl, BG Students, Lion Monster Knocker, Kaylee, Goobert, Partying Book #1, Turntable Voice, Dragon Girl #6, Whiskerene, Gooberry Monster (voices)	50 episodes
2022–2023	Monster High Mysteries	Frankie Stein (voice)	8 episodes
2023	Monster Ball Homecoming	Frankie Stein (voice)	6 episodes
2024	The Fairly OddParents: A New Wish	Winn, Oates, Director, Katie, Lapis Lazuli, Giant Bird, Fairy (voices)	20 episodes
2025	WondLa	Nova (voice)	Episode: "Chapter 8: Home"
2026	Cartoon Cartoons	Harmony (voice)	Episode: "Harmony in Despair"
