= The Flies (English band) =

British pop band (1965–1968)

- Also known as: No Flies on Us; The In-Sect
- Origin: London, England
- Genres: Psychedelic pop; freakbeat
- Years active: 1965–1968
- Labels: Decca; RCA
- Past members: Robin Hunt; Ian Baldwin; George Haywood; John Da Costa; Brian Gill; Stu Calver; Peter Dunton; Chris Manders; David Phimister; Andrew Bown

The Flies, also known as No Flies on Us, were an English psychedelic pop and freakbeat band formed in Wanstead, East London in 1965. Releasing three singles during their recording career, the group is best-remembered for a cover version of "(I'm Not Your) Stepping Stone". Although the Flies' rendition of the song was not too commercially successful, it, along with the band's other material, has since received notice as a result of "(I'm Not Your) Stepping Stone"'s appearance on the early psychedelic compilation album Chocolate Soup for Diabetics, Volume 1.

== History ==
Originally known as the Rebs, the group's line-up featured Robin Hunt (lead vocals, drums), Ian Baldwin (bass), George Haywood (lead guitar), Brian Gill (lead guitar) John Da Costa (rhythm guitar, keyboards), and Peter Dunton (drums). In 1966, the band recorded a British Invasion-exploitation album on RCA Records, Introducing the In-Sect Direct from London, under the name In-Sect, with all but one of the tracks on the piece being cover versions of contemporary pop hits. Later in the year, the group, then known as No Flies on Us, auditioned for Decca Records by presenting them two demos of songs with one later appearing on the band's debut single: a rendition of Paul Revere and the Raiders' tune "(I'm Not Your) Stepping Stone" and "Just Won't Do". The Decca label negotiated a record deal with No Flies on Us after they agreed to shorten their moniker to the Flies.

In October 1966, the band re-recorded a freakbeat cover of "(I'm Not Your) Stepping Stone", along with the new composition "Talk to Me" for the respective A-side and B-side of their debut single. The record became a regional hit, peaking at number 11 on the Wonderful Radio London Fab 40 charts. With a substantial following circulating around the Flies, the group was picked up as the opening live act for popular English bands such as the Move, the Who, and the Moody Blues. In addition, the Flies held a prominent slot alongside the Jimi Hendrix Experience at the popular club, the Roundhouse, in February 1967. The band became notorious for their sometimes outrageous stage acts, particularly their April 1967 appearance at the 14-Hour Technicolor Dream psychedelic festival where the group arranged hundreds of bags of flour to explode and consequently cover the unsuspecting audience. They also heckled Pink Floyd as "sellouts" during the latter's sets at the UFO Club. By way of retaliation, Pink Floyd frontman Syd Barrett included the line "I see the Flies" in outtake solo song "Birdie Hop" (eventually released on compilation album Opel) and used a painting of flies as the cover art for his second solo album.

A follow-up single in mid-1967 included the heavy rocker "House of Love" and the pop standard "It Had to Be You", which, according to AllMusic website reviewer Lindsay Planer, "made the band sound more like Sopwith Camel or the New Vaudeville Band than the acid-laced garage rockers associated with their earlier sides". In addition, Hunt, working on a solo project called Alexander Bell, issued the single "Alexander Bell Theme", which featured guest musician Jimmy Page. The Flies recorded one final single "The Magic Train", this time for RCA Records, in 1968, but it went largely unnoticed. Although the group was beginning to experiment in several unreleased demos with an ethereal organ-driven sound, the Flies disbanded by the end of the year.

Although the Flies' material was not particularly unique to the English psychedelic scene, the band has continued to gain attention for their version of "(I'm Not Your) Stepping Stone"'s appearance on the 1980 compilation album Chocolate Soup for Diabetics, Volume 1, which is one of the earliest collections of rare English psychedelic music. Other works in which the song is featured include The British Psychedelic Trip: 1966 – 1969, The Electric Crayon Set, and Rubble, Volume 3. In 2002, Won-Sin Records released The Complete Collection: 1965 – 1968, an album compiling released material, alternate versions, demos, and tracks from the In-Sect's 1965 cover album.
