= Fly (tent) =

Outer layer of a tent structure

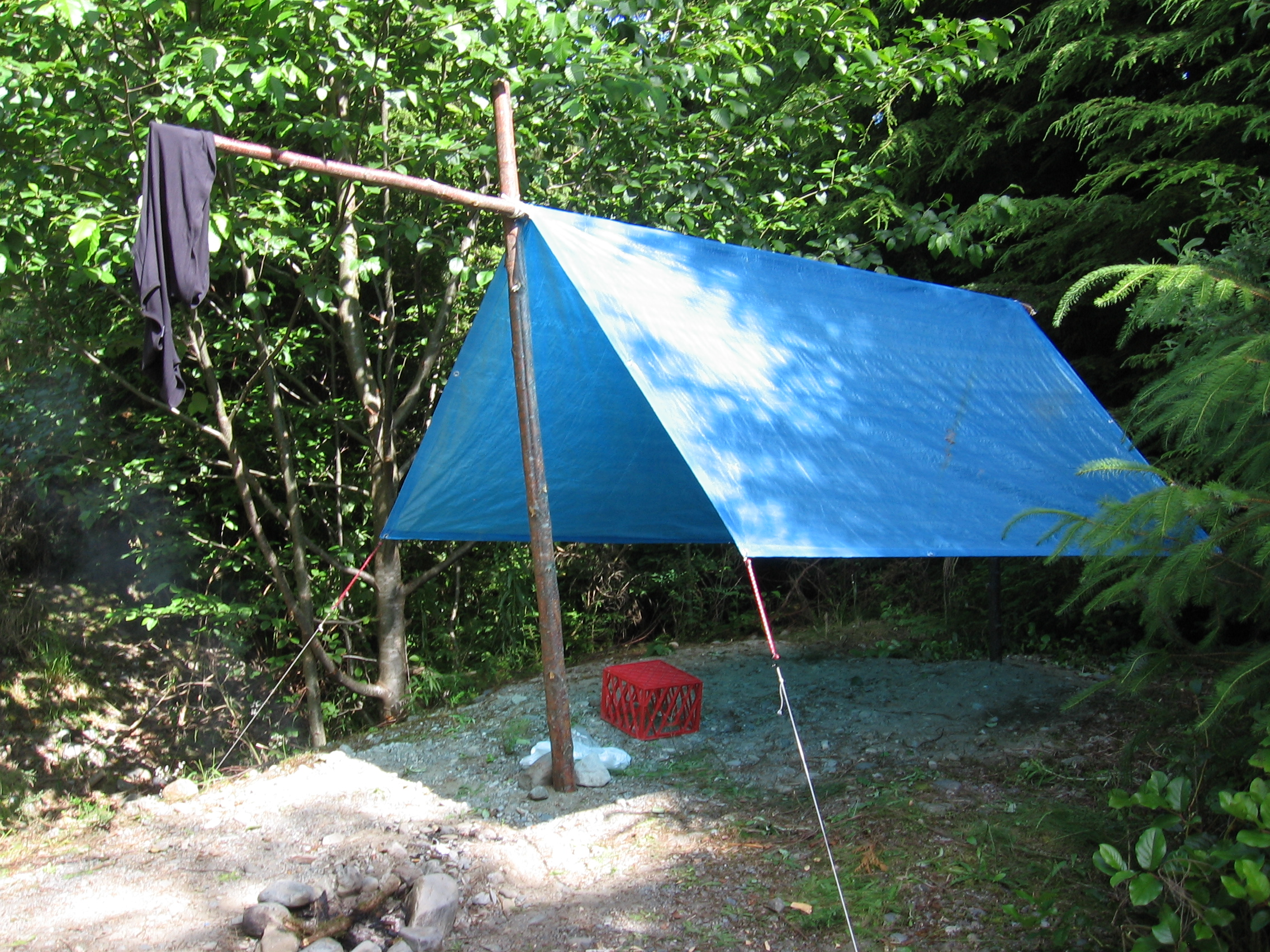
An improvised fly tent using a tarpaulin

Stand-alone fly

A fly refers to the outer layer of a tent or to a piece of material which is strung up using rope as a minimalist, stand-alone shelter. In basic terms, a fly is a tent without walls. Purpose-made stand-alone flies are also sometimes referred to as bivouacs, bivvies, tarpaulins, or hootchies. Flies are generally used for keeping moisture (such as condensation or rain) or sun off people while they eat, rest or sleep. They can also be used as groundsheets, but this is not recommended since it creates wear and tear which can lead to holes.

A stand-alone fly is a multi-purpose tool and is very flexible. For example, a fly can be put up in a wide variety of shapes depending on the environment and the weather, whereas a tent usually has a pre-set configuration for its structure which can be adjusted somewhat but not substantially. A fly also has the advantage of being particularly light and portable.

Disadvantages of flies include that a person is still exposed to the elements such as mosquitoes and cold weather and that it can be difficult to put a fly up if there are limited natural vertical structures such as trees in the camping area. Flies, however, can be put up using poles or jury-rigged, for example, using paddles.

A fly is also used to create shade as in the desert. Then a traditional tent is erected under the fly.

== See also ==
- Tarp tent
