= IParty with Victorious =

2011 television movie on Nickelodeon

iParty with Victorious
- iCarly episode
- Australian DVD cover
- Episode no.: Season 4 Episode 10
- Directed by: Steve Hoefer
- Written by: Dan Schneider
- Based on: iCarly and Victorious by Dan Schneider
- Cinematography by: Mike Spodnik
- Editing by: Danny White
- Original air date: June 11, 2011
- Running time: 69 minutes (original); 86 minutes (extended)

Starring
- Miranda Cosgrove; Victoria Justice; Jennette McCurdy; Nathan Kress; Jerry Trainor; Noah Munck; Leon Thomas III; Matt Bennett; Elizabeth Gillies; Ariana Grande; Avan Jogia; Daniella Monet; Eric Lange; Kenan Thompson

Episode chronology
← Previous "iOMG"	Next → "iLost My Mind"
- iCarly season 4

iParty with Victorious is a 2011 television movie that acts as a crossover of the television series iCarly and Victorious. It premiered on Nickelodeon on June 11, 2011, and serves as the tenth and final episode of the fourth season of iCarly.

The crossover's theme song mash-up, "Leave It All to Shine", premiered on May 22, 2011, on Nickelodeon and was online (YouTube) on June 7, 2011. The movie was watched by 7.3 million viewers. It guest stars Kenan Thompson. "iParty with Victorious" was released on DVD on August 30, 2011, on the third season DVD of iCarly and on the second volume of the Victorious first season DVD.

== Plot ==
Carly Shay (Miranda Cosgrove) (iCarly) is dating a boy named Steven Carson (Cameron Deane Stewart), who divides his time between his divorced parents in Seattle and Los Angeles. Every other month, Steven goes off to Los Angeles, where he is also dating Tori Vega (Victoria Justice) (Victorious), who attends Hollywood Arts, a high school for the performing arts. Robbie Shapiro (Matt Bennett), a socially awkward friend of Tori's, posts a picture of Steven and Tori online, which Carly and her friend Sam Puckett (Jennette McCurdy) stumble upon. Carly denies that Steven is cheating on her, but Sam seeks to prove otherwise.

Carly, her brother Spencer (Jerry Trainor), Sam, and their friends Freddie Benson (Nathan Kress) and Gibby Gibson (Noah Munck) travel to Los Angeles. They visit Spencer's ex-girlfriend, Monie (Jen Lilley), who happens to be a skilled make-up artist, and receive disguise makeovers to avoid being recognized from iCarly. They then head off to Kenan Thompson's house after hearing of a party where Steven might be. Meanwhile, while having lunch at Hollywood Arts High School in Los Angeles, Andre Harris (Leon Thomas III), another friend of Tori's, announces that his real estate agent uncle sold a house to Kenan, who gave permission for Andre to host a small party there as he scheduled to move the month after since he is in New York. Rex, Robbie's ventriloquist dummy, has tweeted about the party, resulting in hundreds of people attending, much to Andre's dismay. The iCarly gang enter Kenan's house during the party and split up to search for Steven. Spencer discovers that the house includes a jacuzzi and relaxes in it, leading to him meeting Tori's teacher Sikowitz (Eric Lange) and her friends Beck Oliver (Avan Jogia) and Jade West (Elizabeth Gillies). Kenan unexpectedly shows up to the house, having expected a bigger party, and is disappointed to see that his stalker has showed up, dressed in a panda suit and assaulting people with a tennis racket. Sinjin Van Cleef (Michael Eric Reid), another student at Hollywood Arts, falls into the jacuzzi when a surfing arcade game malfunctions. Meanwhile, Carly catches Steven and watches him kiss Tori, after which she admits that Sam was correct about Steven cheating on her.

Carly and her friends remove their disguises, explain the situation to Tori, and together come up with a plan to humiliate Steven. As Kenan and Andre are trying to catch the Panda stalker, the iCarly gang and Tori eventually convince him to join their plan. They lure Steven into a closet where he thinks he will make out with Tori for a "100th day anniversary". Instead, when Steven enters the closet, he finds himself on an iCarly webcast with Carly, Sam, Kenan, and Tori, who reveal Steven's deceit to iCarly's one million audience members before they both dump him; Steven becomes embarrassed and flees. Some time later, Sam defeats Rex in a rap battle. The iCarly gang then join Tori and her friends in karaoke, where they end the special by singing "Leave It All to Shine", a mash-up of the iCarly and Victorious theme songs.

== Cast ==
=== iCarly cast ===
- Miranda Cosgrove as Carly Shay – Carly hosts her own eponymous web show titled iCarly and has become an internet sensation. She is Spencer’s younger sister. She is also friends with Sam, Freddie, and Gibby. She is the girlfriend of Steven Carson. When in disguise, she is known as Patty Schwab.
- Jennette McCurdy as Sam Puckett – Carly's delinquent sidekick, troublemaking best friend, and co-host for iCarly. When in disguise, she is known as Regina Goodbody.
- Nathan Kress as Freddie Benson – iCarly's technical producer and director. He is also the techy, geeky neighbor of Carly and Spencer. When in disguise, he is known as Chess Masterson.
- Jerry Trainor as Spencer Shay – Carly's older brother, and a skilled artist. He is also Carly's legal guardian.
- Noah Munck as Gibby Gibson – One of the iCarly gang's friends, and the odd background star of the web show. When in disguise, he is known as Roger Mole.
- David St. James as Mr. Howard – A strict math teacher at Carly's school, Ridgeway Junior High, who hates all his students.
- Mary Scheer as Marissa Benson – Freddie's stereotypically overprotective mother.
- BooG!e as The Panda – A mysterious person dressed in a panda costume that goes around the party whacking people with a tennis racket.

=== Victorious cast ===
- Victoria Justice as Tori Vega – A talented teenager who is a student at Hollywood Arts, an elite performing arts high school. She is also the other girlfriend of Steven Carson, and Trina's younger sister. She is shown to be an iCarly fan in the beginning of the movie.
- Leon Thomas III as Andre Harris – Tori's best friend, an aspiring songwriter and the mentor at Hollywood Arts. He is also the host of the big party at Kenan Thompson's house.
- Matt Bennett as Robbie Shapiro – One of Tori’s friends, and a nerdy student at Hollywood Arts. He is almost always seen with his "best friend" Rex Powers, really a ventriloquist's dummy that he carries around everywhere and whom everyone treats as real. Robbie takes the picture of Tori and Steven that prompts the iCarly team to drive to L.A. and investigate. Jake Farrow provides the uncredited voice of Rex.
- Elizabeth Gillies as Jade West – Tori's frenemy, who always causes her trouble. She is Beck's girlfriend and the occasional antagonist of Victorious.
- Ariana Grande as Cat Valentine – Another one of Tori's eccentric friends who is sweet, cheerful, and also quite dimwitted. In this crossover, Cat has difficulty speaking due to a vocal cord infection and uses a voice simulator called Speechy Keen. Before the end, however, she takes it off after her vocal cords had been fixed and finally sings it out.
- Avan Jogia as Beck Oliver – Another one of Tori's friends, and an actor at Hollywood Arts. He is Jade's boyfriend.
- Daniella Monet as Trina Vega – Tori's diva-like older sister, who also attends Hollywood Arts.
- Eric Lange as Mr. Sikowitz – A popular hippie-like drama teacher at Hollywood Arts.
- Lane Napper as Lane Alexander – The guidance counselor for Hollywood Arts.
- Michael Eric Reid as Sinjin Van Cleef – An odd student at Hollywood Arts.
- Marilyn Harris as Mrs. Harris – Andre's grandmother.

=== Guest stars ===
- Kenan Thompson as himself
- Cameron Deane Stewart as Steven Carson – He is dating both Carly and Tori as their boyfriend, a fact that neither of them are aware of.
- Justin Castor as Mark – A kid who recognizes Gibby and is punched before he can reveal him.
- Jen Lilley as Monie – Spencer's ex-girlfriend who helps disguise Carly, Sam, Freddie, and Gibby.
- Kwame Patterson as DJ Mustang – The DJ at Andre's big party at Kenan Thompson's house.
- Cierra Russell as Mabel – One of the kids who Trina babysits. Trina, forgetting Mabel's name, calls her Vanessa.
- Walt Schoen as Wilson – Another one of the kids who Trina babysits.

== Production ==
iParty with Victorious was produced as episodes 311–313 of iCarly. It does not count as a Victorious episode.

Victoria Justice appears in iCarly for the second time for "iParty with Victorious", following her appearance as Shelby Marx in the special "iFight Shelby Marx" (Sam also comments on Tori Vega's resemblance to Shelby Marx on the computer). Leon Thomas III, Daniella Monet, and Lane Napper also make return appearances, having appeared in the episodes "iCarly Saves TV", "iPsycho", and "iWas a Pageant Girl" respectively.

The crossover special also marks Kenan Thompson's brief return to Nickelodeon. Thompson previously starred in the Nickelodeon shows All That and Kenan & Kel and had done voice work on The Mighty B!. Victoria Justice is credited with the iCarly cast in the opening sequence while the rest of the Victorious cast are credited during the in-show credits. Kenan Thompson is mentioned during the ending credits.

While in Kenan Thompson's house, "The Joke Is on You" by Niki Watkins, "Give It Up" by Elizabeth Gillies and Ariana Grande, performed in the Victorious episode "Freak the Freak Out", and "Number One (My World)" by fictional Ginger Fox is played.

== Music ==
- "Leave It All to Me"
- "Make It Shine"
- "Number One"
- "Leave It All to Shine"

== Subsequent crossovers ==
This is the first of four crossovers between both iCarly and Victorious. The second and third crossovers occur during each show's April Fools' Day specials, both of which debuted on March 24, 2012. At one point in the Victorious April Fools' special, "April Fools Blank", Tori is seen coming out of the elevator and into the living room of Carly's apartment, where Spencer is sitting on the couch. Meanwhile, in the iCarly episode "iApril Fools", Carly, Sam, Freddie, and Spencer appear in Tori's living room sitting next to Robbie, who is actually a transformed version of Gibby. Sam also sings a line from "Make it Shine". The Nickelodeon series Sam & Cat (a crossover/spin-off and sequel of both shows) acts as the permanent fourth crossover, with Sam and Cat living as roommates and starting a babysitting service to fund their adventures. Freddie, Robbie, and Jade make special return appearances in the Sam & Cat hour-long special "#TheKillerTunaJump", and Gibby, Nevel and Nora made a special appearance in the Sam & Cat 45-minute special "#SuperPsycho".

This is also the first of three times that Jennette McCurdy has been involved with Victorious; the second was when McCurdy guest starred as "Crazy Ponnie" in the Victorious episode of the same name, and the third time was reprising her role of Sam on Sam & Cat. On iCarly, Victoria Justice appeared as fighter Shelby Marx in the episode "iFight Shelby Marx", Leon Thomas III as Harper in "iCarly Saves TV", and Daniella Monet as a party goer at Nora Dershlit's house in "iPsycho".

== Reception ==
"iParty with Victorious" received mainly positive reviews from critics. Verne Gay of Newsday gave a positive review, suggesting "iParty with Victorious" may be the biggest event of the mid-2011 and noting the scene depicting a guy in a panda costume chasing Kenan Thompson was hilarious. Carl Cortez of Assignment X praised the episode but also gave a slightly more critical review. He believes "the mechanism for verifying Carly’s boyfriend is cheating is a bit of a stretch". He reacted positively to how the times spent with the characters of iCarly and Victorious are evenly distributed. Overall, he finds the episode to be "enjoyable nonetheless" and gives it a grade of B−. This crossover aired during the 2011 NBA Finals and the 2011 Stanley Cup Finals.

The movie did well in the ratings, drawing 7.3 million viewers, and was the top-rated cable program for the week of June 6–12, 2011.

== See also ==
- List of Nickelodeon original films
