= ICarly season 5 =

Season of television series

iCarly
- Season 5
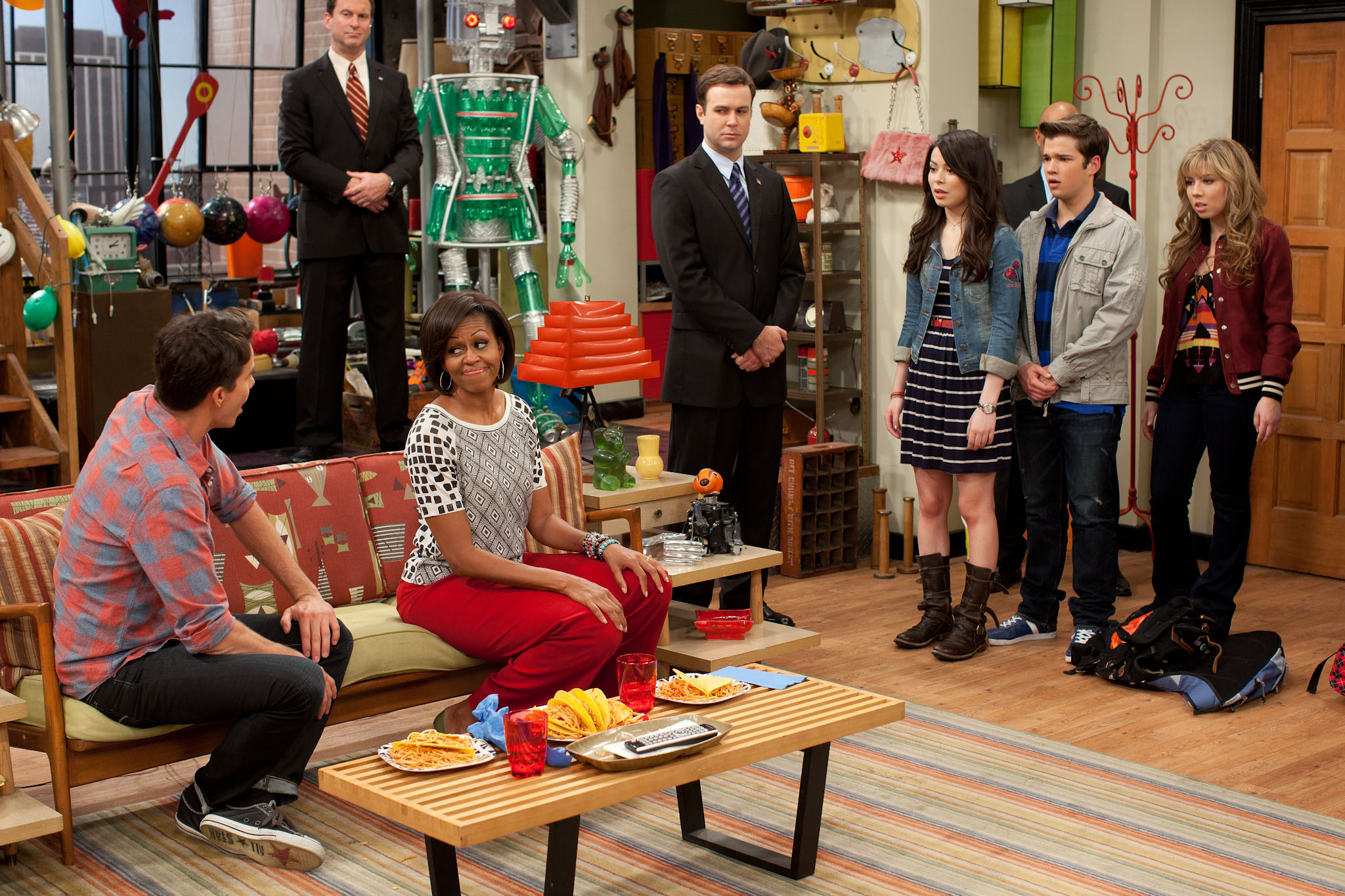
- Behind the scenes photo of "iMeet the First Lady"
- Starring: Miranda Cosgrove; Jennette McCurdy; Nathan Kress; Jerry Trainor; Noah Munck
- No. of episodes: 10

Release
- Original network: Nickelodeon
- Original release: August 13, 2011 – January 21, 2012

Season chronology
- ← Previous; Season 4 Next → Season 6

The fifth season of iCarly began airing on Nickelodeon on August 13, 2011, and finished its run on January 21, 2012.

This season features Carly Shay (Miranda Cosgrove), Sam Puckett (Jennette McCurdy), Freddie Benson (Nathan Kress) and Gibby Gibson (Noah Munck) as their web show, iCarly, is becoming more popular worldwide, with Sam and Freddie now as a confirmed couple, until the episode, "iLove You".

Jerry Trainor co-stars as Carly's older brother Spencer, and Noah Munck co-stars as Gibby. This season had the specials "iLost My Mind", "iDate Sam & Freddie", "iBloop 2: Electric Bloopaloo", "iStill Psycho", and "iMeet the First Lady".

== Season synopsis ==
Following the events of "iOMG", Sam checks herself into a mental hospital, unable to handle her mixed feelings towards Freddie. During an iCarly webcast live from the institution, Freddie and Sam share a kiss, symbolizing the start of a new relationship.

In the next few episodes ("iDate Sam & Freddie", "iCan't Take It", and "iLove You"), Sam and Freddie continue their relationship. In "iDate Sam & Freddie", Freddie and Sam are constantly arguing, and enlist the help of Carly to resolve all their fights, until Carly gets fed up and tells them to simply break up if all they do is fight. In "iCan't Take It", Freddie and Sam have stopped arguing, but their relationship creates problems for those around them. Gibby, indignant at Sam now directing her violent tendencies towards him now that she is dating her previous target, devises a plan to break them up with the help of Freddie's disapproving mother. This plan nearly works but Carly eventually convinces them to make up. In "iLove You", Freddie and Sam's relationship comes to an official end after they realize they have hardly anything in common with each other, though not before they profess their love for one another and suggest that they may rekindle their relationship.

After the first few episodes of this season, T-Bo moves into Freddie and Mrs. Benson's apartment in Bushwell Plaza after being evicted from The Groovy Smoothie. Sam and Freddie help him do this by disguising him as a respectful gentleman. This initially works, but Mrs. Benson later evicts him upon discovering his true personality, though she later has a change of heart and decides to let him stay after he rescues the gang from an obsessed fan.

== Development ==
In late January 2011, while doing press for her North American Dancing Crazy concert tour, Miranda Cosgrove began telling news sources that she was looking forward to returning to Hollywood to begin filming a 5th season of iCarly. On January 27, 2011, Cosgrove told Cleveland Live News "We're getting ready to start the next season, right after the tour. I would be willing to do the show as long as people like it and as long as it works." On January 28, 2011, Reuters news agency also reported that Cosgrove was preparing to begin filming a 5th season of iCarly, and on February 3, 2011 Cosgrove told The Middletown Press, when speaking of the show and her co-stars Jennette McCurdy and Nathan Kress, "I've known them since I was little. I can't wait to get back. I'm really comfortable doing iCarly. It's like my home away from home." Cosgrove concluded her Dancing Crazy concert tour on February 24, 2011, and Jennette McCurdy finished her Generation Love mall tour on April 14, 2011. The entire cast did not even get together until the 2011 Kids' Choice Awards. Miranda Cosgrove recently confirmed that filming would resume shortly. At the 2011 Kids' Choice Awards, Jerry Trainor stated that filming would resume in May.

== Cast ==
=== Main cast ===
- Miranda Cosgrove as Carly Shay
- Jennette McCurdy as Sam Puckett
- Nathan Kress as Freddie Benson
- Jerry Trainor as Spencer Shay
- Noah Munck as Gibby Gibson

=== Recurring cast ===
- BooG!e as T-Bo
- Mary Scheer as Marissa Benson
- Danielle Morrow as Nora Dershlit

=== Guest stars ===
- Jim Parsons as Caleb ("iLost My Mind")
- Taran Killam as Secret Service Agent ("iMeet the First Lady")
- Michelle Obama as herself ("iMeet the First Lady")

== Episodes ==
No. overall	No. in season	Title	Directed by	Written by	Original release date	Prod. code	U.S. viewers (millions)
75	1	"iLost My Mind"	Steve Hoefer	Dan Schneider & Matt Fleckenstein	August 13, 2011	402	5.51
After the events of iOMG, Sam has been missing for three days. Carly and Freddie track her phone and discover she has checked herself into a mental institution, struggling to understand her complicated feelings for Freddie. After talking with Freddie, Sam decides she is not insane and tries to leave, but cannot as she is under 18 and needs a parent to sign. Since Sam's mom is away and they need to shoot iCarly the next night, they have Spencer dress up as Sam's mother, though this backfires when a patient recognizes him from law school. The gang decide to do the show from the institution, during which Carly reaches out to various iCarly fans to ask how they would feel about Sam and Freddie as a couple, all of whom seem enthusiastic about the idea. Freddie then cuts in to point out that nobody has taken his feelings into consideration. Sam, assuming he is about to reject her, begins scolding him, but he abruptly cuts her off with a kiss. Meanwhile, Gibby becomes acquainted with a patient named Caleb, who believes he is from the year 2077.
76	2	"iDate Sam & Freddie"	Steve Hoefer	Dan Schneider & Jake Farrow	September 10, 2011	401	4.10
Sam and Freddie have begun a very rocky relationship, constantly arguing with one another and enlisting a reluctant Carly to act as their "couple's counselor" and resolve all their fights, even sometimes at 3:00am. Freddie and Sam later go on a date, but take Carly with them and have her sit at a nearby table so she can continue to mediate their conflicts. As another argument brews between the couple, Carly snaps and says that if they cannot work out their issues on their own, they should not even be dating at all. Meanwhile, Gibby gets a puppy and wants to raise it with Carly in an attempt to get closer to her.
77	3	"iCan't Take It"	Adam Weissman	Dan Schneider & Arthur Gradstein	September 17, 2011	403	4.75
Sam and Freddie have finally stopped arguing, but their relationship proves to create problems for those around them - Sam and Freddie skip iCarly shoots to go on dates, and Sam has begun taking out her violent tendencies on Gibby now that she is dating her former bullying target. Gibby reveals their relationship to Mrs. Benson, who begins conspiring with him to break them up. Meanwhile, Freddie's application to a prestigious technology camp is rejected. Mrs. Benson and Gibby force Carly to reveal that Sam had purposefully sabotaged his application a few months prior. Initially upset, Freddie contemplates breaking up with her, but Carly convinces them to reconcile. Gibby, having had a change of heart, sings a love song to celebrate their mended relationship.
78	4	"iLove You"	Steve Hoefer	Dan Schneider & Jake Farrow	September 24, 2011	404	3.45
Carly convinces Sam and Freddie to participate in each other's activities. Freddie takes Sam to his train engineer club, which ends in disaster when Sam reprograms the trains to crash into each other and explode, leading to Freddie's expulsion from the club. Later, Sam takes Freddie to the Seattle Penitentiary to visit her Uncle Carmine and Cousin Chaz, smuggling ham in his pants to deliver to them. They get caught, leading to a heated argument between the two. Meanwhile, Spencer begins dating his old babysitter, who still treats him like a child. Carly accuses them of trying to force themselves into a romantic relationship despite the fact that they are not compatible. Sam and Freddie overhear and realize that Carly's advice could apply to them as well. In the elevator, they profess their love for each other but decide to break up, although agree that they could date each other again if they become more compatible in the future. Freddie checks his phone and sees that it is only 10:30pm, and they decide to kiss in the elevator until midnight.
79	5	"iQ"	David Kendall	Dan Schneider & Matt Fleckenstein	October 1, 2011	405	3.83
Carly has a crush on a very smart British guy named Kyle. When she learns that Kyle broke up with his last girlfriend for lacking intelligence, she begins studying so she can impress him, but unable to remember all the things she studied, she writes notes on her arms and under her plate for her date with him. She gets caught in the middle of the date, so he breaks up with her for her dishonesty. Meanwhile, T-Bo is evicted from The Groovy Smoothie. Freddie gives him a chance to move into his and Mrs. Benson's loft. In order for Mrs. Benson to approve, he, Gibby, and Sam dress T-Bo in sensible clothing and have him put on the persona of a polite and respectful gentleman. Mrs. Benson is impressed by him and allows him to move in. Meanwhile, Spencer tries to open a safe he found at the junk yard.
80	6	"iBloop 2: Electric Bloopaloo"	Clayton Boen	Dan Schneider & Matt Fleckenstein	December 28, 2011	411	3.09
Christopher Cane, a ventriloquist dummy who plays Rex from Victorious, interviews the cast and shows their bloopers from the show, while invariably insulting the actors and/or forcing them to record plugs for his brand of salsa. (He makes an exception for Noah Munck, instead commending his acting skills.) The interviews go in the following order: Jennette McCurdy (Sam), Nathan Kress (Freddie), Jerry Trainor (Spencer), BooG!e (T-Bo, though they did not review his bloopers), Noah Munck (Gibby), and Miranda Cosgrove (Carly).
81	7	"iStill Psycho"	David Kendall	Dan Schneider & Jake Farrow	December 31, 2011	407–408	5.50
The iCarly crew are summoned to Nora Dershlitt's parole hearing. They decide to advocate for her release from prison after seeing how her situation is affecting her parents. Nora and her parents invite the iCarlys to their house for dinner. However, when Spencer comes to retrieve them, the family locks him in the basement and the others in their house and refuses to let them leave. They also tie Spencer to a wheel and make it spin whenever they misbehave. Gibby escapes through the chimney, but gets stuck. Meanwhile, T-Bo is evicted from the Bensons' apartment after Mrs. Benson discovers his true personality. Carly and Sam use Spencer's shock pen to short-circuit Freddie's head computer chip, giving Mrs. Benson an emergency notification. Mrs. Benson and T-Bo rush to Nora's house to rescue them, leading to the arrest of Nora and her parents put into custody. Grateful for his help in rescuing Freddie, Mrs. Benson decides to let T-Bo stay with them permanently. At the end of the episode, Carly wakes up in the middle of the night, realizing that they had forgotten about Gibby, who is still stuck in the Dershlitts' chimney.
82	8	"iBalls"	Russ Reinsel	Dan Schneider & Ben Huebscher	January 7, 2012	410	4.14
iCarly is interviewed by a TV station, though the reporter shows no interest in interviewing Freddie as he is not a "creative" member of the show. Carly goes to Yakima to take care of her grandfather who is recovering from foot surgery, leaving Sam to host the show by herself. However, Freddie, desperate to prove his own creativity, convinces Sam to allow him to co-host the show with her while Gibby works the camera. Things go awry when nobody finds his skit funny. Sam convinces him to focus on technical inventions, which leads to him developing new 3D technology and showcasing it on iCarly. iCarly fans are originally impressed by the 3D effects, though they later complain of negative effects on their eyesight. Initially feeling guilty, Freddie later becomes reassured when he learns that his 3D technology had cured the eyesight of a teenage girl with severe vision problems. Meanwhile, Spencer hires a personal assistant named Marty.
83	9	"iMeet the First Lady"	Adam Weissman	Dan Schneider & Arthur Gradstein	January 16, 2012	406	4.26
Carly and Spencer's father plans to come home to celebrate his birthday with his children, but cannot make it at the last minute due to an emergency. The iCarly team sympathizes with an upset Carly, so they celebrate her father's birthday in the middle of the show by connecting her to a video chat with him. When the Secret Service learns of the video call and shows up at Carly's apartment, Carly, Sam, and Freddie fear that they may be arrested. Later, First Lady Michelle Obama visits the iCarly crew and explains that they are not in trouble, but that she was very touched by what Freddie and Sam did for their friend and how proud Carly was of her father. The episode ends with Michelle appearing as a guest on an iCarly webcast.
84	10	"iToe Fat Cakes"	Russ Reinsel	Dan Schneider & Matt Fleckenstein	January 21, 2012	409	4.84
To reward Sam for a 10-day streak of no bad behavior, Freddie and Carly gift her a tour of the Canadian Fat Cake factory in Vancouver. Sam's greed finally gets the better of her when she tries to smuggle over 100 Canadian Fat Cakes, which are illegal in the United States, over the border. She is briefly detained, and is later held back again because she does not have an ID card, therefore unable to prove that she is an American citizen. Gibby decides to hide Sam in his suitcase to sneak her over the border, but the suitcase is later accidentally swiped by a man with an identical-looking suitcase while Gibby is distracted by a fan, resulting in Sam being taken to Hong Kong. Elsewhere, Carly, who stayed home to go on a date with a boy named Lance, gets her toe stuck in the bathtub faucet after imitating a scene she saw from The Dick Van Dyke Show, in the episode "Never Bathe on Saturday". Several attempts to free herself, including with help from Mrs. Benson, all fail before Lance arrives and sees her. Carly and Lance have their date in the bathroom while a plumber works on the faucet.
