= ICarly season 6 =

iCarly
- Season 6
- Starring: Miranda Cosgrove; Jennette McCurdy; Nathan Kress; Jerry Trainor; Noah Munck
- No. of episodes: 13

Release
- Original network: Nickelodeon
- Original release: March 24 – November 23, 2012

Season chronology
- ← Previous; Season 5

The sixth and final season of iCarly began airing on Nickelodeon on March 24, 2012. This season features Carly Shay (Miranda Cosgrove), Sam Puckett (Jennette McCurdy) and Freddie Benson (Nathan Kress), as their web show, iCarly, is becoming more popular worldwide. iCarly aired its 100th produced episode in this season, making it the first Nickelodeon live-action sitcom to reach that number. Nickelodeon shows like Drake & Josh, Zoey 101 and others usually lasted around 65 episodes. As of 2019, only Nickelodeon's sketch comedy series All That and Henry Danger had reached a similar number of episodes.

On May 17, 2012, it was announced that this season would be the final season, and the series finale event would air in November 2012. However, Nick promoted the October 6, 2012 episode, "iShock America", as the start of the "final season". The series concluded on November 23, 2012 with a two-part special episode titled "iGoodbye". An iCarly revival later premiered in June 2021.

== Cast ==
=== Main cast ===
- Miranda Cosgrove as Carly Shay
- Jennette McCurdy as Sam Puckett
- Nathan Kress as Freddie Benson
- Jerry Trainor as Spencer Shay
- Noah Munck as Gibby Gibson

=== Recurring cast ===
- BooG!e as T-Bo
- Reed Alexander as Nevel Papperman
- Mary Scheer as Marissa Benson
- Jeremy Rowley as Lewbert
- Tim Russ as Principal Franklin
- Mindy Sterling as Miss Briggs
- David St. James as Mr. Howard

=== Guest stars ===
- One Direction as themselves ("iGo One Direction")
- Jimmy Fallon as himself ("iShock America")
- Tina Fey as herself ("iShock America")
- Questlove as himself ("iShock America")
- David Chisum as Colonel Steven Shay ("iGoodbye")
- John Ducey as Darnell ("iFind Spencer Friends")
- Emma Stone as Heather ("iFind Spencer Friends")
- Rick Harrison as himself ("iLost My Head in Vegas")
- Austin "Chumlee" Russell as himself ("iLost My Head in Vegas")
- Corey "Big Hoss" Harrison as himself ("iLost My Head in Vegas")

== Synopsis ==
The final season shows their web show getting much more popular as they are invited to night shows, getting brand deals and have special musical guests. They travel to New York to meet Jimmy Fallon. Freddie and Gibby try to be cool and pretend they are in a band. They later travel to Las Vegas, Nevada and meet the Pawn Stars guys. The gang later try to find a suitable adult friend for Spencer, rescue Carly from an old friend of Sam's, and also try to solve the case for Sam's missing laptop. In the last episode, Carly's and Spencer's dad pays a visit and takes Carly to a dance and also takes her to Italy with him, leading to an indefinite hiatus of the iCarly web show.

== Episodes ==
| No. overall | No. in season | Title | Directed by | Written by | Original release date | Prod. code | U.S. viewers (millions) |
|---|---|---|---|---|---|---|---|
Part 1 (Note: While these thirteen episodes were produced in a single production season, Nickelodeon advertised "iShock America" (i.e. the first episode of "Part 2") as the start of the "final season".)
| 85 | 1 | "iApril Fools" | Jerry Trainor | Dan Schneider & George Doty IV | March 24, 2012 | 503 | 3.4 |
Carly and Spencer are about to leave their apartment on April Fool's Day because they are evicted by Mr. Bushwell after Spencer forgot to pay their rent after they moved in, and Carly accidentally stabbed him. Sam, Freddie, and Gibby arrive, and Carly says that they all had good times in this apartment and remembers one time when they were all sitting on the couch watching on TV an episode where the characters were doing flashbacks from past episodes (fake footage of past episodes). By the end of the episode, Mr. Bushwell comes with Lewbert to tell them to leave the building. Then, Sam asks them to remember the time when they went there and changed their minds about Carly and Spencer leaving, which turns out to be a replay of the scene with Lewbert and Bushwell entering the door. Then, Bushwell lets Carly stay, and Spencer (dressed up as Doc Brown from the Back to the Future films) appears and says he knows the future regarding a "future episode of iCarly" about their kids (Freddie and Carly's or Freddie and Sam's). Then, T-Bo appears inside a tiny flying bubble and transports them all in it.
| 86 | 2 | "iGo One Direction" | Steve Hoefer | Dan Schneider & George Doty IV | April 7, 2012 | 501 | 3.9 |
After returning from vacation, Carly falls ill with "Jungle Worms", but feels better after two days, although she is still contagious. Later, Freddie tells Sam, Carly, and Gibby that he has received an e-mail from the manager of boyband One Direction (whom Gibby appears to be a massive fan of), saying that they are in the Seattle area and would like to perform a song on iCarly. When they arrive, One Direction performs "What Makes You Beautiful" in the iCarly studio. (Afterwards, Sam takes a liking to Zayn Malik while Gibby tells Niall Horan and Louis Tomlinson that he gives good foot massages). After Harry Styles drinks from Carly's water bottle, he gets Jungle Worms from Carly, and then she takes care of Harry and he is still in bed after a week, much longer than Carly was sick for, making Sam believe that Harry is not actually sick anymore and just wants the attention. Liam Payne announces that the boys will have to cancel their shows in San Francisco if Harry is not better soon, so Liam, Zayn, Niall, and Louis discuss with Carly, Sam, and Freddie what to do to try to get Harry out of bed. Freddie says that Harry might feel better if he thought that he was being kicked out of One Direction and being replaced by Gibby, and when he sees Gibby performing with Liam, Niall, Louis, and Zayn, Harry is shocked by how bad Gibby is at singing and dancing and says that he is feeling better, meaning that he was faking. The episode ends with One Direction performing "What Makes You Beautiful" on iCarly. After the song, Sam grabs Zayn by the neck and drags him into the elevator.
| 87 | 3 | "iOpen a Restaurant" | Steve Hoefer | Dan Schneider & Jake Farrow | April 21, 2012 | 502 | 2.8 |
After their computer monitor and TV (which was found in the dumpster behind El Taco Guapo and was stolen by a man sleeping next to it) are stolen, Spencer starts developing a security robot. At first, he builds one that blinds intruders, but takes it apart after it accidentally blinds Carly. He then makes one that shoots corn at intruders, but it malfunctions and accidentally attacks Carly, Freddie, and Spencer. They try to have it focus on Mrs. Benson and unplug it, but Spencer is not able to pull the plug out of the outlet before the machine runs out of corn, so Mrs. Benson is heavily pelted with corn. Elsewhere, Sam and Gibby open a secret restaurant named Gibby's in the basement at school. Bully Billy Boots harasses and annoys Gibby. Sam tries to intervene by sending Gibby to go on a walk and trying to talk to Billy, but when Gibby returns later, Billy attacks him, and Sam beats up Billy with a Butter sock. The next day, Billy tells Mr. Howard about the restaurant in hopes that it will be shut down. Even though Principal Franklin, who is one of Gibby's customers as well, agrees that the restaurant violates numerous school rules, he approves it and lets Sam and Gibby keep running it secretly when Mr. Howard is out of earshot.
| 88 | 4 | "iHalfoween" | Adam Weissman | Dan Schneider & Ben Dougan | April 28, 2012 | 505 | 2.9 |
Carly, Sam, and Freddie wonder why people never celebrate Halloween more than once a year. They celebrate it halfway through the year as well, creating a new holiday termed "Halfoween" and having a party. Carly dresses up as a life-size serving of tuna sushi, Sam dresses up with a hat with "hand sanitizer" on it, and Freddie dresses up as Lewbert. Once Nevel finds out, he dresses as a purple robot and gives the "iCarly's" candy, which changes their voice and freaks out many people. Because of this, they angrily split up to find out who the purple robot is. Freddie successfully finds Nevel in the iCarly studio. He calls Carly and informs her that it was Nevel, but Nevel's henchmen, Ivan and Dimitri, force Freddie into the robot costume. Nevel silences him and magnetically seals it on the head so Freddie cannot take off the costume. Meanwhile, Sam and Carly get their real voices back, and Freddie probably does too. After Freddie is sent downstairs, he is caught by Gibby and Spencer. Still silenced, Freddie is unable to tell his friends that it is he in the costume, not Nevel. Subsequently, he is suspended and lowered twenty times in Spencer's new game, Jerk Basket, and everyone thinks that it is Nevel being punished. After Carly and Sam feel they have their revenge, they realize Nevel was right behind them, happily watching Freddie get jerked. Nevel unlocks Freddie's robot head, and they find an angry Freddie. Spencer tries to apologize to him, giving him a free stuffed unicorn from the Jerk Basket, only for Freddie to throw it back at him. Nevel finally feels he has had his revenge for the"iCarlys" not regaining his popularity after the incident with the man in a wheelchair (at the end of iPity the Nevel). Carly pretends she feels sorry and lets Nevel stay at the party, but she makes Sam "dangle" him above Spencer's Jerk Basket. They finally let him fall, and he collapses in a huge pile of toys and prizes. All the partygoers clap and cheer as Nevel is then suspended once more.
| 89 | 5 | "iPear Store" | David Kendall | Dan Schneider & Jake Farrow | May 12, 2012 | 504 | 2.8 |
Freddie gets a job at a Pear Store, but when Carly, Sam, and Gibby go down to the store, Freddie is given incredibly dumb customers, which Sam can sell to more easily than Freddie. The manager sees this and gives Sam a job, much to Freddie's dismay. Gibby tries to decide on a phone case with an extremely nervous store employee. Carly tries to flirt with a nerdy store employee, but he is oblivious to everything she tries. She gets him to come over to her apartment, but he tries to act cool, which Carly does not like. Meanwhile, Spencer starts a fire for the 18th time after fixing his snowwoman sculpture, which nearly burns down, so the fire department refuses to put out any future fires, which causes Carly to be upset at Spencer, and she forces him to make up with them. To apologize, Spencer brings burnt fudge nut brownies to the fire department, but they make him volunteer at the fire station, where he accidentally starts a fire in the kitchen. After this, the fire department refuses to respond to Carly and Spencer's fires for good. At the Pear Store, Freddie is still getting dumb customers, and Sam has been promoted to assistant manager. Freddie complains, which gets him fired. After this, Sam, upset about the way Freddie is being treated, quits her job.
| 90 | 6 | "iBattle Chip" | Adam Weissman | Dan Schneider & Jake Farrow | June 9, 2012 | 506 | 2.4 |
After Chuck and some of his 8th-grade friends pull a prank on Spencer and steal his clothes, Spencer calls the cops on Chuck and finally gets rid of him by getting him sent to military school. However, this causes his little brother Chip to hate Spencer and terrorize him more than Chuck did. Elsewhere, Gibby buys a Galaxy Wars toy phaser and becomes depressed when Sam accidentally breaks it while beating up a bully for Lervin at the Groovie Smoothie. Freddie fixes it, but also modifies it into an actually working heat laser gun. During an iCarly webcast, Chip antagonizes everyone with loud music, making it impossible for them to continue, and sends a video threat to them. Downstairs, they find Spencer, who has been tied up by Chip. Gibby sets his phaser on "Overload", causing it to overheat. Before it explodes, Spencer throws it down the hallway where Chip is preparing a tub of super glue for another prank. The exploding phaser blows up the tub, and Chip gets thrown back by the explosion and is glued to the elevator's doors. When Spencer and the others go to check what happened and find him, Carly says that they cannot leave Chip like this. Spencer agrees, but instead sprays cream on his butt before everyone leaves. Gibby tries to salvage his phaser, but Freddie confirms it has gone beyond repair.
Part 2
| 91 | 7 | "iShock America" | Steve Hoefer | Dan Schneider | October 6, 2012 | 510–511 | 3.6 |
Jimmy Fallon invites the gang to New York to appear on his show after Carly dedicates a webshow to him, parodying his skits in response to Jimmy complimenting iCarly on his show. Gibby buys pants, which caused a few problems during the show. While the gang starts dancing, Gibby's pants fall, causing indecent exposure on camera, as he is not wearing any undergarments at the time. This incident prompts the NCC to show up. People blame Fallon for the incident by saying he deliberately wanted Gibby's pants to fall. Carly and her friends do an episode of iCarly, saying it was their fault and not Fallon's. The NCC forces them to pay $500,000, or they will shut down iCarly, so Fallon blogs asking America for their spare change to help the iCarly gang get the money. At the end of the episode, Fallon invites the gang back on the show and shows them a big pile of money, totaling $576,094, which is more than enough to pay the fine.
| 92 | 8 | "iGet Banned" | David Kendall | Dan Schneider & Jake Farrow | October 13, 2012 | 507 | 3.6 |
Freddie and Gibby are stunned when two hot girls are impressed by two nerds who are part of a band. Then Freddie comes up with a plan to form a fake band to impress other girls. Upon seeing them talk with two girls, Sam offers to help them book their own gig. Then, in the iCarly webcast, Sam announces Freddie's and Gibby's gig in their new band at the Groovy Smoothie and says that there is no way they are cancelling. So they decide to put on a fake fight, which nearly works as Gibby does not follow the plan exactly and accidentally knocks Freddie out for real. Elsewhere, Carly bans T-Bo from the loft after he destroys some things in her house and knocks out her date with a lemon launcher and comes over without invitation in the middle of the night to watch a movie about a Jamaican astronaut. T-Bo retaliates by banning her from the Groovy Smoothie and spraying her with a skunk. Later, T-Bo explains that he needs relief from stressful living in the Benson apartment every now and then and makes a bet with Carly - if she can handle living at the Benson apartment for at least one night, he will not come to the loft without asking, and she can go back to the Groovy Smoothie. Soon, Carly has an over-healthy dinner and gets sprayed by a tick-gaser, and then Mrs. Benson holds a fire drill for everyone in the middle of the night and says that they will do another one soon. Carly then concedes to T-Bo and lets him come over whenever he wants. In exchange, T-Bo lets Carly come back to the Groovy Smoothie. Meanwhile, Spencer has a broken leg after wearing roller blades in the shower despite having been warned by Carly not to. When he realizes that his phone is in his cast, he has to slap his cast on the thigh whenever he needs to answer the phone.
| 93 | 9 | "iFind Spencer Friends" | Russ Reinsel | Jake Farrow | October 20, 2012 | 512 | 3.3 |
Spencer's birthday is coming up, and Carly, Sam, Freddie, and Gibby think that since Spencer has had fights with T-Bo, been kicked out of places, and hangs out with too many people younger than him, he needs some friends his own age. Carly and Sam find Spencer a friend from the Groovy Smoothie, and the supermarket, while Freddie and Gibby find Spencer a friend at a gym locker room. Spencer has dinner with these so-called friends, but cannot stand them because he has nothing in common with them. The friends also cannot stand Spencer because of his childish nature. In the meantime, a waiter is insulted when the iCarly gang teases him and sabotages their food, which is accidentally passed to the three friends, who later get sick. At the end of the episode, the iCarly gang has a huge spaghetti taco, but first they play Jamaican laser tag. Meanwhile, Gibby marries Baggles (a recurring iCarly character), and he gets a job as a bathroom attendant. At the diner, the gang meets a crazy fan called Heather who goes nuts over seeing them.
| 94 | 10 | "iRescue Carly" | Steve Hoefer | Dan Schneider & Matt Fleckenstein | October 27, 2012 | 509 | 3.3 |
When Sam's longtime friend, Dana, is released from the juvenile detention facility, Carly really wants to meet her, but Sam does not think it is a good idea. Later on, while they are at Groovy Smoothie, Dana invites Carly to her party at an abandoned house, and Carly could not be any happier, but Sam knows that Dana is up to something. When Carly arrives at the party, she finds herself overwhelmed and frightened at how dangerous it is. Meanwhile, Spencer has some fun with a pair of night-vision goggles that he found. At Dana's party, Freddie and Gibby arrive in order to help Carly, but instead end up getting tied up and tortured. In the end, Sam arrives just in time to rescue them and beats everyone at the party with her butter sock while wearing night vision goggles.
| 95 | 11 | "iLost My Head in Vegas" | Jerry Trainor | Dan Schneider & Jake Farrow | November 3, 2012 | 508 | 3.5 |
Sam learns that her mother is being held in a Las Vegas jail after she disrupted a Celine Dion concert and her bail is $2,500. The iCarly gang asks Spencer to borrow Socko's RV and drive them to Las Vegas. Spencer tells them to bring anything worth big money to sell for cash at a pawn shop. Eighteen hours later, they arrive at the World Famous Gold & Silver Pawn Shop, where they try to sell a Texas-shaped potato chip (that Chumlee eats), a vintage Pear computer (which blows up when Big Hoss turns it on), and a half-empty bottle of Wahoo Punch that Michelle Obama drank from and autographed. Rick agrees to pay them $2,500 for the bottle, and the gang heads to the jail to bail out Pam. When they get there, they realize they have left Gibby back at the pawn shop with the money. They return to the pawn shop and find that Gibby has been robbed of the money. A Japanese customer offers $10,000 for Gibby's rubber head, but Gibby refuses to sell it. Sam knocks him out and sells the head. Afterwards, they get ready to get to the jail on time, but Spencer is taking a shower in the RV.
| 96 | 12 | "iBust a Thief" | Steve Hoefer | Matt Fleckenstein | November 10, 2012 | 513 | 3.4 |
After a webcast, Sam notices her laptop is missing. Freddie remotely activates the webcam with the laptop's serial number, and they see an old lady in front of it. After watching her for eleven hours, they figure out where she lives and go to her apartment, breaking down the door. However, once there, they find out that Sam gave them the wrong serial number and now think that Sam's laptop is gone forever. When they get home, Sam goes to the fridge to get food and finds her laptop in a pizza carton. She leaves and takes the carton with her without telling anyone. Meanwhile, Spencer finds his old lunchbox filled with Funk E. Festers tickets, his favorite arcade game, which he collected when he was ten years old, to win a plush dolphin, after he misplaced it. However, when he gets there, he finds out they are worthless since the arcade switched to electronic points. Since adults are not allowed to enter without a child, he takes Guppy with him to get in. After spending the entire day at the arcade, he manages to get the 1,000 points he needs just before it closes and wins his plush dolphin.
| 97 | 13 | "iGoodbye" | Steve Hoefer | Dan Schneider | November 23, 2012 | 514–515 | 6.4 |
Carly awaits her father's arrival in Seattle to escort her to the Father-Daughter Air Force Dance, but she gets a message saying he is unable to come. To comfort Carly, Spencer asks to take Carly to the dance, and she accepts. Shortly before the dance, Spencer becomes sick after Lewbert sneezes on him and is unable to escort Carly. Carly is very upset because she's been unable to attend the last four years due to her father's overseas posting, and this is the last year she is eligible to attend. Sam convinces Freddie and Gibby to take Spencer's place, but this just upsets Carly more. Surprisingly, Colonel Shay arrives and escorts Carly to the dance after all. After the dance, Colonel Shay informs everyone that he has to return to his base in Italy and invites Carly to move with him. Despite Carly's initial reluctance, Carly receives supportive encouragement from everyone and accepts the offer. The gang heads upstairs to the studio to stream their last iCarly webcast together, with Colonel Shay present. Carly and Freddie are alone in the studio and kiss for the last time before she departs, and Sam gives Carly the remote from the webshow as a keepsake of their friendship. Elsewhere, Sam and Spencer work together to fix a motorcycle for Socko, but Sam gets to keep it after he no longer needs it, Freddie gets a phone that is twice the size of a regular phone constantly getting teased by everyone for it, and Gibby gets his head stuck in a machine when he gets a new head to make up for the one he lost in Las Vegas. The episode and series conclude with Carly, Sam, Freddie, Spencer, and Gibby all reflecting on the many ups and downs they have shared over the years while Carly watches archived highlights of various iCarly web shows before the plane takes off. Elsewhere, Sam takes her new motorcycle for a ride out of Seattle, leading to the events of Sam & Cat.
