= ICarly season 4 =

iCarly
- Season 4
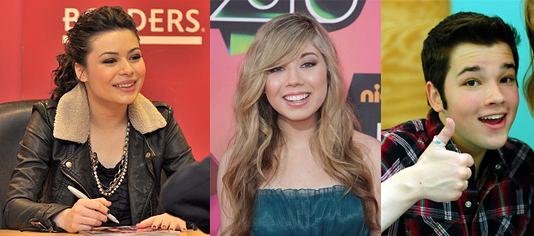
- iCarly Season 4 Cast
- Starring: Miranda Cosgrove; Jennette McCurdy; Nathan Kress; Jerry Trainor; Noah Munck
- No. of episodes: 10

Release
- Original network: Nickelodeon
- Original release: July 30, 2010 – June 11, 2011

Season chronology
- ← Previous; Season 3 Next → Season 5

The fourth season of iCarly began airing on Nickelodeon July 30, 2010, and ended on June 11, 2011. The season features Carly Shay (Miranda Cosgrove), Sam Puckett (Jennette McCurdy) and Freddie Benson (Nathan Kress) as their own web show iCarly is becoming more popular worldwide. Jerry Trainor co-stars as Carly's big brother Spencer. Noah Munck joins the main cast this season as Gibby Gibson. The specials of the season include "iGot a Hot Room", "iSam's Mom", "iDo", "iStart a Fan War", "iOMG", and "iParty with Victorious".

== Cast ==
=== Main ===
- Miranda Cosgrove as Carly Shay
- Jennette McCurdy as Sam Puckett
- Nathan Kress as Freddie Benson
- Jerry Trainor as Spencer Shay
- Noah Munck as Gibby Gibson

=== Recurring ===
- Mary Scheer as Marissa Benson
- BooG!e as T-Bo
- Ethan Munck as Guppy Gibson
- Reed Alexander as Nevel Papperman
- Greg Mullavy as Grandad Shay
- Tim Russ as Principal Franklin
- David St. James as Mr. Howard

=== Guest stars ===
- Jack Carter as Gilbert Gibson ("iGot a Hot Room" and "iStart a Fan War")
- Jane Lynch as Pam Puckett ("iSam's Mom")
- Irina Voronina as Krustacia ("iSell Penny Tees")
- J. D. Walsh as Gordon Birch ("iDo")
- Jack Black as Aspartamay ("iStart a Fan War")
- Max Ehrich as Adam ("iStart a Fan War")
- Abby Wilde as Stacey Dillsen ("iStart a Fan War" and "iHire an Idiot")
- Alec Medlock as Craig Ramirez ("iStart a Fan War")
- Scott Halberstadt as Eric Blonowitz ("iStart a Fan War")
- Jake Farrow as Gavin ("iStart a Fan War")
- Daniel Booko as Cort ("iHire an Idiot")
- Teresa Castillo as Ashley ("iHire an Idiot")
- Victoria Justice as Tori Vega ("iParty with Victorious")
- Leon Thomas III as Andre Harris ("iParty with Victorious")
- Matt Bennett as Robbie Shapiro ("iParty with Victorious")
- Elizabeth Gillies as Jade West ("iParty with Victorious")
- Ariana Grande as Cat Valentine ("iParty with Victorious")
- Avan Jogia as Beck Oliver ("iParty with Victorious")
- Daniella Monet as Trina Vega ("iParty with Victorious")
- Kenan Thompson as himself ("iParty with Victorious")
- Michael Eric Reid as Sinjin Van Cleef ("iParty with Victorious")
- Eric Lange as Sikowitz ("iParty with Victorious")
- Lane Napper as Lane ("iParty with Victorious")
- Caitlin Carmichael as Molly ("iPity the Nevel")

== Season synopsis ==
Starting from this season onwards, Gibby begins to hang out more often with Carly, Sam and Freddie than in the past three seasons.

In November of this season, the iCarly crew accidentally starts a fan war at WebiCon over who should date, Carly and Freddie (Creddie), or Sam and Freddie (Seddie). Despite the three confirming that none of them are dating, the fan war still seemingly remains unresolved. However, five months later, the three complete their two-month search for an intern for iCarly, at which point Sam — much to Carly's and Freddie's confusion and suspiciousness — begins hanging out with Freddie and Brad, the new intern, every time she gets the chance to. When Freddie tests his selfmade "MoodFace" app on Sam, it confirms that she is actually in love. Thinking that Sam still hates Freddie, he and Carly misunderstand the results, believing that Sam is in love with Brad, and Carly takes great steps into proving this. Sam still tries to convince her that she is not in love with him though. Freddie later finds Sam in the school yard and gives her a heart-to-heart talk about opening up and taking a risk when it comes to romantic feelings, not realizing that he is actually referring to himself. In the middle of the talk, Sam grabs Freddie and kisses him passionately, revealing that in fact he is the one she is in love with, as a shocked Carly watches through the window.

== Episodes ==
No. overall	No. in season	Title	Directed by	Written by	Original release date	Prod. code	U.S. viewers (millions)
65	1	"iGot a Hot Room"	Steve Hoefer	Dan Schneider	July 30, 2010	301	7.7
Spencer makes a gummy bear lamp for Carly's 16th birthday and puts it in her bedroom to surprise her, but it catches fire and burns down her room. However, Spencer receives $82,000 in an insurance settlement after hearing their great-grandmother's expensive diamond-encrusted bezel watch was destroyed in the fire, which he puts towards completely rebuilding her room. Her new bedroom includes a makeup station, a computerized wardrobe, and a gummy bear chandelier (made from fireproof gummy bears).
66	2	"iSam's Mom"	Adam Weissman	Jake Farrow	September 11, 2010	305	5.9
After an argument with her mother, Sam moves in with Carly and Spencer. When Sam's crude habits and messy living conditions become a problem, Carly invites Pam, Sam's mother, to the apartment so she and Sam resolve their problems. When this fails, Carly enlists a psychiatrist to lock the girls in a tiny room called a therapy box, unable to be set free unless they reconcile, which they eventually do. Meanwhile, Freddie is in danger after a criminal he unmasked at the Groovy Smoothie discovers his address and identity. He and Mrs. Benson hide in Carly and Spencer's apartment, along with a body guard who was in the army. Spencer switches the numbers on Freddie's door with a door down the hall, which works when the criminal arrives seeking revenge.
67	3	"iGet Pranky"	Adam Weissman	Arthur Gradstein	September 25, 2010	304	5.2
Carly enlists Spencer to help her prank Freddie and Sam. Although reluctant due to a traumatic pranking experience in high school, Spencer agrees to help her. The prank is successful, but reawakens his obsession with pranking people. Carly convinces Spencer's high school classmates to hold an intervention, but they merely beat up Spencer as revenge, and flee when Carly catches them.
68	4	"iSell Penny Tees"	Russ Reinsel	Matt Fleckenstein	October 2, 2010	303	4.0
Sam decide to hire local fourth graders to help manufacture and sell the famous iCarly "Penny Tees." Horrified by Sam's unethical treatment of the kids, they open their own penny tee workshop, but stop the business when the kids are only able to produce six shirts in one day. The children working under Sam quit as well, having had enough of the unfair work conditions. The gang attempts to give the kids a second chance, but discover they have started their own Penny Tee business and hired writers their age. Meanwhile, Spencer is dating a girl from Uzbekistan who only speaks Uzbek. Gibby invites over his bus driver, who also speaks fluent Uzbek, but since the bus driver also does not speak English, the girl ends up going out with the bus driver instead.
69	5	"iDo"	Steve Hoefer	Jake Farrow	October 11, 2010	302	6.7
An iCarly fan named Gordon proposes to his girlfriend Jodi on the show, and she accepts. They invite the iCarly crew to the wedding, but at the last minute, Jodi refuses to marry Gordon, claiming she has fallen in love with Spencer instead. In order to win her back over, Gordon attempts to perform a song he wrote for Jodi, but has Carly sing it on his behalf instead when he is overcome with stage fright. Hearing the song reminds Jodi why she fell in love with Gordon in the first place, and the wedding commences. Meanwhile, Gibby enlists the help of an old woman to retrieve a five dollar bill from a tree.
70	6	"iStart a Fan War"	Steve Hoefer	Dan Schneider	November 19, 2010	308–309	5.0
The iCarly team attends the fan convention Webicon, and accidentally start a dispute between fans over whether Freddie should date Carly or Sam. Spencer also attends the event cosplaying the character Aruthor from the game World of Warlords, and gets into a dispute of his own when he runs into a fellow fan cosplaying Aruthor's nemesis, Aspartamay. Elsewhere, Gibby, who was also supposed to attend Webicon with the iCarly crew, is held up due to his grandfather's poor sense of direction.
71	7	"iHire an Idiot"	Clayton Boen	Arthur Gradstein	February 12, 2011	307	4.9
The iCarly crew decide to hire an intern to help mitigate the work needed to produce iCarly. Sam and Carly impulsively hire an attractive interviewee named Cort, despite his lack of competence or intelligence. Freddie retaliates by hiring another beautiful but dim-witted intern named Ashley, whom he promises to fire on the condition that Sam and Carly fire Cort as well. Sam and Carly eventually agree, and both interns are fired. However, as she is leaving, Ashley reveals that she is actually an honor student at a prestigious university, and was only pretending to be stupid to help Freddie, planning to use the experience to write her sociology thesis. Meanwhile, Spencer tries to sneak one of his sculptures into an art museum to prevent his grandfather from making him go back to law school.
72	8	"iPity the Nevel"	Russ Reinsel	Matt Fleckenstein	March 19, 2011	306	4.6
After a video of Nevel yelling at a little girl goes viral and causes the public to scorn him, he asks the iCarly gang for help in restoring his reputation. After various failed attempts at repairing his image, Nevel admits on an iCarly webcast that he sincerely regrets his behavior. The little girl then surprises Nevel by appearing on the webcast and accepting his apology. Nevel successfully manages to win the public back over, but this is short-lived as he is soon thereafter filmed losing his temper at an elderly man in a wheelchair who bumped into him.
73	9	"iOMG"	Adam Weissman	Dan Schneider	April 9, 2011	310	8.8
iCarly hires a new intern named Brad, who teams up with Freddie for a school project developing a mood reader application. Sam uncharacteristically offers to help them on their project, and starts joining them on hangouts. When a suspicious Freddie tests the app on Sam, the results claim she is in love. Freddie, assuming Brad is the object of Sam's affection, informs Carly, who encourages Sam to confess her feelings to him despite Sam's insistence that she doesn't love Brad. Freddie eventually confronts Sam, whereupon she continues to deny her feelings for Brad. Freddie starts to try and motivate her to make a move on Brad, but she abruptly interrupts him with a kiss, revealing that he is the one she is in love with, as a shocked Carly watches the scene from inside the school through a window.
74	10	"iParty with Victorious"	Steve Hoefer	Dan Schneider	June 11, 2011 (original); August 27, 2011 (extended)	311–313	7.3 (original); 3.7 (extended)
Carly is in a brand new relationship with a boy named Steven. Sam goes online to TheSlap.com and sees Steven with another girl by the name of Tori Vega and tries to inform Carly that Steven is cheating on her, but Carly refuses to believe her unless she has proof, saying "everyone is innocent until proven cheaty". The group, including Gibby, decide to drive down to Los Angeles and crash a party at Kenan Thompson's house that Andre, one of Tori's friends, is holding, via a public invite posted by Rex, the puppet of Robbie, another one of Tori's friends, to find out if Steven is really cheating on Carly. But before they arrive at the party, they get professional disguises for the party in case anyone recognizes the iCarly gang (which would cause major distractions). They stop at the house of Moni, who was Spencer's past girlfriend and is also a celebrity makeup artist. Moni, though still angry at Spencer for backing a car over her, transforms them into different looking people. When many people show up to the party and begin to party recklessly thanks to Rex's post, Andre tries to get some people to calm down and/or leave, as he thought there were only supposed to be a few people at this party, though failing, while getting chased by a mysterious man in a panda suit. Kenan arrives and is surprisingly cool with the party, claiming that there are not enough people at the party. However, he is annoyed at the panda, who has stalked him for years, and agrees to help Andre chase him off his property. Carly catches Steven with Tori, and she sees him giving Tori the same exact charm bracelet that he gave her and telling her, "it's one of a kind, just like you", which he also had told Carly at the beginning of the episode. Tori then tells Steven that she loves him and Steven says "I love you too" making Carly devastated. Tori finds Carly and her friends at the party, now in their normal looks, where Carly reveals that Steven is cheating with both of them. Carly and Tori, together with Sam, Freddie and Kenan, come together with a plan to expose Steven's bad nature live on iCarly in front of a million people in a small closet where Tori and Steven originally planned to have their 100-day kiss. Steven angrily leaves the closet while the iCarly gang party inside. The whole time this is happening, other events occur, including Spencer with Jade and Beck, friends of Tori, and one of Tori's teachers, Mr. Sikowitz, having an awkward encounter in a hot tub, Trina, Tori's sister, having trouble babysitting two younger children for a friend while attending the party, and Rex having a freestyle rap battle with random people in the audience, though eventually getting beaten by Sam. The episode then closes with the casts of the two shows singing a mashup of their theme songs, "Leave It All to Shine".
