= ICarly season 3 =

TV Season

iCarly
- Season 3
- Starring: Miranda Cosgrove; Jennette McCurdy; Nathan Kress; Jerry Trainor
- No. of episodes: 18

Release
- Original network: Nickelodeon
- Original release: September 12, 2009 – June 26, 2010

Season chronology
- ← Previous; Season 2 Next → Season 4

The third season of iCarly aired on Nickelodeon from September 12, 2009, to June 26, 2010. The season features Carly Shay (Miranda Cosgrove), Sam Puckett (Jennette McCurdy) and Freddie Benson (Nathan Kress) as they continue their web show "iCarly." Jerry Trainor co-stars as Carly's big brother, Spencer Shay. This season resulted from the 45-episode second season being split, with the remaining 20 episodes marketed as the show’s third season.

When released to DVD, "iThink They Kissed" and "iCook" were featured on the "iCarly Season 2: Volume 2" DVD, while the rest of the season is released as "iCarly Season 2: Volume 3". This season had the specials "iThink They Kissed", "iMove Out", "iQuit iCarly" "iSaved Your Life", "iSpace Out", "iBloop" "iWon't Cancel the Show" and "iPsycho". A few episodes this season and last season were released on the "iCarly Collection" DVD that was released in July 2013.

== Cast ==
=== Main cast ===
- Miranda Cosgrove as Carly Shay
- Jennette McCurdy as Sam Puckett
- Nathan Kress as Freddie Benson
- Jerry Trainor as Spencer Shay

=== Recurring cast ===
- Noah Munck as Gibby Gibson
- Mary Scheer as Marissa Benson
- BooG!e as T-Bo
- Jeremy Rowley as Lewbert
- Danielle Morrow as Nora Dershlit
- Emily Ratajkowski as Tasha
- Ryan Ochoa as Chuck Chambers
- Ethan Munck as Guppy Gibson
- Mindy Sterling as Miss Briggs
- Tim Russ as Principal Franklin
- David St. James as Mr. Howard

=== Guest stars ===
- Skyler Day as Magic Malika ("iSpeed Date")
- Chord Overstreet as Eric ("iSpeed Date")
- Kit Pongetti as Marta Trundel ("iFind Lewbert's Lost Love")
- Christopher Michael as Officer Carl ("iMove Out")
- Lane Napper as Ernie ("iWas a Pageant Girl")
- Betsy Rue as Ginger Fox ("iFix a Pop Star")
- Drake Bell as himself ("iBloop")
- Daniella Monet as Popular Girl ("iPsycho")
- Drew Roy as Griffin ("iBeat the Heat")

== Season synopsis ==
In the season opener, Sam, intoxicated and giggly from nitrous oxide, spills the beans to Carly about her and Freddie's first kiss, which she cannot remember soon afterwards. When Carly tells Freddie what Sam said, he changes the subject and so Carly attempts to pin him down just to get him to confess. Freddie then says it is true, so Carly then asks Sam and Freddie to come to her apartment without telling each other and when they arrive, she confronts them about keeping the kiss a secret from her. In the end, Sam and Freddie decide it is time to stop keeping secrets and tell Carly that they will tell each other everything.

Two weeks later, the three find themselves in a Girl's-Choice-Dance situation, so they have to find dates to the dance. When all three dates end badly; Sam finding out that her "potential" date, Gibby, has a girlfriend, Freddie being somewhat annoyed at his date's magic tricks and Carly constantly being interrupted by her date, Carly and Freddie engage in a romantic slow-dance at the Groovy Smoothie. It is at this moment that Sam walks in and sees them. Upon seeing them, she silently walks away without being noticed.

Four months later, Freddie pushes Carly out of the way of an oncoming taco truck on the road, saving her life and getting himself severely injured in the process. Carly is so grateful that she visits his room often to take care of him until he is back on his feet and at one point kisses him. In just a day of Carly and Freddie beginning their relationship, Sam tells Freddie, based on her experience with a boyfriend who sent her bacon, that Freddie is Carly's bacon, that she only loves him for what he did. Freddie does not believe her at first, but later that week, at Carly's apartment, he realizes that this may be true and tells her this. The two pause their short relationship, but decide that once the whole "hero" thing wears off and Carly is attracted to Freddie because of who he is, they will try the relationship again.

== Episodes ==
No. overall	No. in season	Title	Directed by	Written by	Original release date	Prod. code (Note: As a result of this season being part of the second season production count, this set of episodes maintains their Season 2 production codes.)	U.S. viewers (millions)
47	1	"iThink They Kissed"	Adam Weissman	Steve Holland	September 12, 2009	227	7.6
Carly takes Sam to the dentist after her tooth falls out during the webshow. The dentist, Doctor Wheeler, drills Sam's teeth and eventually uses nitrous oxide. Sam has an odd side-effect to the nitrous oxide, thinking her thumb is missing and that it is a secret that she likes fried chicken. When the time comes to tell a true secret, Sam accidentally reveals that her and Freddie shared a secret kiss (iKiss). Carly asks Freddie, to which he says yes in a nervous tone. Sam gets involved, which ends up in her confronting Freddie. Elsewhere, Spencer sculpts a gigantic pair of pants with some prisoners. When Spencer takes the sculpture home, it turns out to be heavier than he thought, which leads to Carly, Sam, and Freddie discovering that there are still some prisoners inside of them. The refugees escape, with the trio secured to chairs with Duct Tape.
48	2	"iCook"	Roger Christiansen	Dan Schneider	September 19, 2009	228	3.8
On the webshow, Carly and Sam show their viewers how to make spaghetti tacos, a food invented by Spencer. Food TV calls the Shay apartment and asks if they can interview the iCarly gang about spaghetti tacos. During the interview, Ricky Flame, a popular Seattle chef, comes into the iCarly studio and challenges the gang to a "food fight" (cook-off). When the iCarly trio wins, Ricky (who won all his previous food fights) gets depressed and ends his cooking career. The iCarly gang encourages him to start up again, but it doesn't work. Ricky (who reveals to have an obsession with winning) instead starts wrestling little kids at a local club. Ricky then harasses Carly as an act of revenge for his earlier defeat. Seeing Ricky's true colors, Carly retaliates by having Sam take him down. Elsewhere, Spencer has a vision that he hugs Nug-Nug, a character from Galaxy Wars, at the Groovy Smoothie, after being electrocuted by Sam's locker. After several hours of waiting, Spencer leaves, but Nug-Nug arrives having come from a convention. Subsequently, Spencer quickly rushes in and hugs Nug-Nug.
49	3	"iSpeed Date"	Russ Reinsel	Andrew Hill Newman	September 26, 2009	230	4.7
After spitting in her crush's eye, Carly becomes humiliated and tries to find a new date for a popular school dance. Sam feels for Carly's frustration, and hatches a plan to get her a date. During the webshow, Sam handcuffs Carly to a chair and duct-tapes her mouth shut while asking boys from the Seattle area to apply for Carly's date. When the gang is overwhelmed by the number of boys who show up at the meeting place (Groovy Smoothies), they set up a speed-dating session. Carly then tells Sam that she must ask Gibby to go to the dance if Carly had to go with a random iCarly fanboy. When Sam goes to invite Gibby to the dance, he surprisingly turns her down. She discovers Gibby has a girlfriend, Tasha. When Carly's pick, Austin, keeps interrupting her every time she speaks, she reaches her breaking point by screaming "shut up" at him multiple times and then telling him to "get out of here", which he does. The episode ends when Sam returns to the Groovy Smoothie and sees Carly and Freddie dancing a slow dance. Upon seeing this, she silently leaves unnoticed. Elsewhere, Spencer tries to exercise daily with the help of a mobile phone application. However, the app continuously goes off at random times, to which he eventually gives up and sits on the couch after it tells him to do sit-ups.
50	4	"iCarly Awards"	Steve Hoefer	Andrew Hill Newman	October 3, 2009	223	4.4
Carly, Sam, and Freddie present "iCarly Awards" for unusual successes of their fans (one of whom was a guest in the first webcast of iCarly). When Spencer accidentally only makes one 10-foot iCarly award (despite the fact they needed ten 1-foot awards), he "borrows" some European swimsuit models to help him build ten smaller statuettes. The photographer, who was originally going to need the European swimsuit models for a calendar, demands that Spencer hand them over. Spencer constantly refuses, and eventually ties the photographer up until the awards are over. In the end, Carly surprisingly presents the giant iCarly award to Spencer, for "Best iCarly Award Builder / Best Big Brother". In the end, everyone begins to randomly dance and the photographer enters and chases Spencer.
51	5	"iHave My Principals"	David Kendall	Matt Fleckenstein	October 17, 2009	229	4.7
Harold Gorman, the superintendent of Seattle Schools, fires Principal Franklin after he appears as a guest on iCarly as a favour to the gang for his daughter’s upcoming birthday. Gorman considers it unbecoming for a principal to climb out of a gigantic pair of pants and willingly sit on fudge balls, so Franklin is replaced by Ms. Briggs and Mr. Howard as the co-principals. The new principals make major changes to the school, including harshly punishing the students and adding a strict dress code. Elsewhere, Spencer tries to become a master bull rider. In the end, the iCarly gang get Principal Franklin hired back.
52	6	"iFind Lewbert's Lost Love"	David Kendall	Matt Fleckenstein	November 14, 2009	236	5.0
When Sam goes to get her phone in Lewbert's office after leaving it in there during an iCarly prank she finds a box of his deeply personal items, and goes through it in the iCarly studio along with Carly and Freddie. The gang learn Lewbert used to be a handsome male model who dated a woman named Marta Trundel. The group calls Marta and sends her to the main lobby of Bushwell Plaza to surprise Lewbert to make Lewbert happy. When he instead throws a fearful tantrum, the iCarly gang soon discovers that Marta is a violently crazy woman who abused him so bad the stress grew his wart and ended his career as a model. Lewbert explains that he had run away from her by going on a cruise with her and then he jumped overboard, moved to Seattle, and changed his last name. The next night, Carly tells Marta that the gang was wrong to call her, causing Marta to think Carly wants her out of the way so she could have Lewbert to herself. Elsewhere, Spencer takes a job as building watch patrol and tries to catch a criminal, which turns out to be his arch-nemesis, Chuck Chambers whom he was partnered with. Chuck has been stealing TV remotes after his dad banned him from watching TV for a month. In the end just as the cops arrive (after the screaming, chasing, and fighting), Lewbert takes the blame and is arrested for 30 days for stealing TV remotes. When the sentence is revealed to be not long enough for Marta to give up and leave, he intentionally slaps one of the cops so that he can go to prison for six months.
53	7	"iMove Out"	Steve Hoefer	Arthur Gradstein	November 28, 2009	241	5.7
After Mrs. Benson pushes Freddie too far by making him eat his asparagus while doing "iCarly" (this causes iCarly fans to put asparagus on his locker), followed by his mother showing people at school his baby pictures after making her wait outside in the car for 9 ½ minutes and vacuuming his ear while he was sleeping after refusing to let her on every third Friday, he reaches his breaking point, moves out, and gets his own apartment on the elevator room of Bushwell Plaza. Meanwhile, Carly, Sam, and Freddie start a pet photography business, only to see their studio destroyed by a competing pet photography business run by snooty owners Stewart Butler and Oliver Paisley. To get revenge, the trio decide to destroy their studio. When Stewart and Ollie come back early, Carly, Sam, and Freddie hurry home. Sam, however, kidnaps their cat Harmoo just before leaving and they later blackmailed them by telling them that they have to clean up their studio and everything they destroyed, they will shave Harmoo's fur off if the petographers call their friends Officer Carl and the rest of the police. Mrs. Benson realizes she needs Freddie and he makes her promise not to embarrass him in public again.
54	8	"iQuit iCarly"	Steve Hoefer	Dan Schneider	December 5, 2009	233–234	8.8
Part 1: Freddie gets an email from two kids who run the Fleck and Dave show, who request that Carly and Sam help them make a video for a website contest. After agreeing to help, Carly and Sam discover that Fleck and Dave fight a lot, and the two end their friendship when Fleck paints Dave's dad's car purple for a sketch. Carly and Sam try to talk to them, but Carly finds that she can relate to Dave's frustrations, and Sam to Fleck's argument of Dave shooting down good, yet dangerous ideas. Part 2: Carly and Sam end their friendship soon afterwards. Since neither wants to be near the other, Freddie sets up dual location webcasting on iCarly. However, due to technical difficulties, Carly and Sam declare iCarly is over for good, and shut down the webshow. Carly and Dave try to do a video, as well as Fleck and Sam. They both try and do videos for the contest with Freddie, but end up at the same place at the same time. During the argument, Sam, and then Carly climb outside onto the window washer's platform without harnesses, a stunt which nearly costs them their lives, when a cable breaks and Carly hangs off the side of the platform. Elsewhere, Spencer wins a boat in a contest, and he and Gibby try to make it fun in the parking lot, since docking at the Seattle pier is too expensive. However, a jerk who lives in the building wants their spot, so he and his baseball team, the Pirates, take over the boat. Spencer and Gibby take it back with a slingshot and watermelons. After winning, Spencer uses his scope and spies Carly hanging off the platform. Spencer races up with a rope, after Sam rescues Carly. When Spencer tosses down the rope out the window and accidentally hits Sam in the head, she almost falls. Carly rescues her, and they tie the rope around themselves, and Spencer, Freddie, Fleck, and Dave pull them up. Spencer turns them towards each other when Carly and Sam started crying and finally reconcile, as do Fleck and Dave. In the end, the four, together, make a trailer to a non-existent film called The Blowing starring Carly, Sam, Fleck, Dave, Freddie, and Gibby.
55	9	"iSaved Your Life"	Larry LaFond	Eric Goldberg & Peter Tibbals	January 18, 2010 (original); February 12, 2010 (extended) (Note: On February 12 and 13, Nickelodeon aired an extended version of the episode, which includes seven minutes of scenes cut from the original episode.)	232	11.2 (original); 4.1 (extended)
When Carly is crossing a street and does not see a taco truck turning around the corner, Freddie does and pushes Carly out of the way. Carly is safe, but Freddie is severely injured due to getting struck by the truck. Carly starts to develop feelings for Freddie and nurtures him until he's back on his feet. Then Sam has a conversation with Freddie about the accident and realizes that Carly's feelings toward Freddie might have been more of a reaction to him saving her life, rather than about her true feelings for him. Freddie takes Sam's advice and pauses his romance with Carly. They agree that if Carly still has feelings for him after the whole "hero thing" wears off, that they might consider rekindling their relationship. Elsewhere, Sam and Spencer are up against each other in a paintball "assassin" game to see who wins the final round (originally Carly and Freddie were part of the game until they lost the first round prior to the episode starting).
56	10	"iWas a Pageant Girl"	Adam Weissman	Andrew Hill Newman	January 29, 2010	237	5.2
Sam admits to her friends that she was a former child beauty pageant contestant when a friend appearing on iCarly says she will be competing in the pageant using martial arts for the talent round, Sam was suspended due to her being suspected of pushing a candidate down a stage, but was being framed, then convinces Carly into competing against her old rival. Eventually though, when Sam learns she can enter the pageant (because she was suspended for 7 years, which was 7 and a half years ago), she enters again, hoping to defeat her arch-rival. Sam actually gets her wish, because she won the pageant because she is able to reunite with her old dance teacher Ernie who does a dance for the talent round. Meanwhile, Spencer had a rock climbing date planned with his new girlfriend Allison. She tries to cancel it because her cousin, Leslie is coming to town. Spencer tells Allison that he can invite Freddie and make it a double date and she agrees. Freddie initially refuses but then later agrees to go on the date. When the girls arrive, Allison says that the climb time isn't until 8:30 and that they have a half hour to spare. They start playing a game. Eventually, they miss their climb time and the girls leave because Freddie and Spencer get too serious about finishing the game.
57	11	"iEnrage Gibby"	Jonathan Goldstein	Jake Farrow	February 5, 2010	235	4.8
When Freddie helps Gibby's girlfriend, Tasha, find a gift for his birthday party in the iCarly studio, Tasha accidentally falls on Freddie. Gibby then walks in and thinks Freddie "macked on" Tasha, so he challenges Freddie to a fight on iCarly. Freddie learns that Gibby is an amazing kickboxer and is being trained by Sam so that they can fight on the webshow. In the end, Freddie shows Gibby a webcam video (that has been watching a peanut butter sandwich mold) which shows Tasha actually falling on Freddie. Upon seeing the video, Gibby apologizes to Freddie, saying, "I feel like a turd." and they become friends again. Elsewhere, Spencer is mistakenly reported dead because of natural causes in the papers, so he capitalizes on the opportunity to sell his art for more money than if he was living. But then he realizes he doesn't want to be dead anymore, because it's boring sitting in the house. He then tries to tell people he's alive. But this changes when an old love interest visits to offer Carly condolences and wishes he was still here. So he apparently exposes himself and says that he is a twin brother named "Sponcer", to which Carly asks "If you had a twin brother, why would his name need to sound similar to yours?"
58	12	"iSpace Out"	Russ Reinsel	Jake Farrow	March 5, 2010	239	5.3
A billionaire asks Carly, Sam, & Freddie to put on the first live web show from outer space. So, they're able to undergo tests for space travel, competing against the web show called "Exercise Rocks." While Carly gets Sam and Freddie to stop fighting, she ends up flipping out because she is claustrophobic and dislikes small spaces, and finds a hammer and breaks the glass breaking out of the simulation room, disqualifying iCarly from the procedures. Meanwhile, Spencer is bothered by a mysterious little girl who follows him through the whole apartment, but she keeps hiding before anyone else can see her. As a result, everyone else just thinks that she's just a figment of Spencer's imagination. In the end, the little girl does the same with Carly, but only exits. Carly then passes this off as "space madness".
59	13	"iFix a Pop Star"	Steve Hoefer	Matt Fleckenstein	March 19, 2010	231	3.8
The gang learn their music video for Wade Collins (made in "iRocked the Vote") is the second most downloaded music video behind Ginger Fox's music video, a talentless, shrewish former popstar who lost her credibility after suffering a mental breakdown. Carly, Sam, and Freddie are shocked when they learn she's a huge fan of iCarly and their music video and wants them to produce her comeback. However, they find out she hasn't rehearsed or had a hit in seven years and refuses to put the effort into rehearsing. In the end they use lip-syncing to hide her inability to sing and use back up dancers to hide her lack of dancing. While, the show is a hit, they are disgusted at how a talentless woman could be so famous. Elsewhere, Spencer begins dating Charlotte, Gibby's mother, but has difficulty kissing her when he realizes she looks too much like Gibby, but Charlotte says Spencer looks too much like Carly. When they start kissing, Spencer sees Gibby's face, and Charlotte sees Carly's face and they mutually break up.
60	14	"iBloop"	Steve Hoefer	Dan Schneider	April 17, 2010	245	4.3
In a special episode separate from the continuity of the series, Miranda Cosgrove and Jerry Trainor introduce bloopers and outtakes featuring the entire cast, including clips from episodes not yet broadcast, due to the production code order. The episode also features a brief appearance from Drake Bell.
61	15	"iWon't Cancel the Show"	Steve Hoefer	Eric Goldberg & Peter Tibbals	May 1, 2010	238	4.9
Freddie learns that Sam is in juvie, and will not get out in time to do iCarly. Carly is determined not to cancel the show since her father will be watching, so she asks Spencer to fill in, which will prove difficult since he has a date that same night that he can't cancel. The show consists of Gibby brushing his teeth with mustard, the famous iCarly plays: "The Cowboy and the Farm girl who thought the Cowboy's moustache was a squirrel" and "The Englishman who is a terrible father to his two children", pouring sour milk into Lewbert's briefcase and showing random clips throughout the show. Eventually, Spencer's date appears in the studio and runs out after being humiliated on the web. Absent: Jennette McCurdy as Sam Puckett
62	16	"iBelieve in Bigfoot"	Steve Hoefer	Dan Schneider	May 8, 2010	240	4.4
Carly tries to prove there's a Bigfoot creature, a legendary creature claimed to have been seen by many people in the Pacific Northwest, after Bigfoot fever hits Seattle. So the iCarly gang goes up to Mount Baker National Forest in Socko's RV, surprised to find Dr. Sydney Van Gurbin, a Bigfoot researcher who was on iCarly and made the book "Bigfoot: True or Real". However, they discover Bigfoot is actually Dr. Van Gurbin in a costume to improve sales for his book. Meanwhile, Spencer becomes obsessed about the "Beavecoon", a combination of a beaver's head and a raccoon's body that he claims to have seen as a kid.
63	17	"iPsycho"	Steve Hoefer	Dan Schneider & Ben Huebscher	June 4, 2010	243–244	7.5
Carly, Sam, and Freddie try to cheer up a lonely fan Nora Dirshlitt on her 16th birthday. Nora's parents abandoned her on her birthday, she has no guests at all and shortly after the iCarly trio arrives, an 87-year-old clown has an aneurysm (and probably died from it) and Sam acts incredibly obnoxious. Carly and Freddie decide to do a special iCarly webcast to show people from Nora's school they are at her party, and a lot of people show up. Nora is happy about her sudden popularity. When the party is over, she traps Carly, Sam, and Freddie in a basement, thinking that they were angels sent to her to change her life and is worried that she will go back to being a nobody once they leave. To make sure that no one knows what happened to them, she cancels their appearance at Webicon and texts their respective families that everything is going fine. After a few failed attempts to escape, Carly gets an idea to make a coded SOS message for Gibby with the hint "Every fourth (Carly). Word (Freddie). Every fourth (Sam). Word (Freddie)". The decoded message then says "The (Freddie) crazy (Sam) girl (Carly) trapped (Sam) us (Carly), please save us (Sam)". Elsewhere, Gibby, however, is doing home repairs with Spencer in exchange for setting up a camp in the loft. When he gets the message and manages to decode it, Gibby, along with his younger brother Guppy (Ethan Munck), leaves to rescue them. When Nora recognizes Gibby from iCarly and refuses to let him in, he breaks down the door and starts fighting with her. Nora and Gibby are evenly matched, but luckily, Guppy finds Nora's keys and releases the others with Nora distracted by Gibby. Sam uses the "Vulcan Nerve Pinch" (a reference to Star Trek) on Nora, which knocks her out. The iCarly trio call the police, and Nora goes to juvenile detention. While Carly sympathizes for her, Sam says that at least she'll make friends in prison. The episode ends with Carly, Sam, Freddie, Spencer, Gibby, and Guppy all singing "100 Cartons of Milk on the Wall" around a campfire, which they ironically learned from Nora.
64	18	"iBeat the Heat"	Steve Hoefer	Steve Holland	June 26, 2010	242	4.2
After a power outage during a heatwave, everyone in the apartment building goes to the Shays' apartment for Spencer's Norwegian air conditioning, including Mrs. Benson, Lewbert, Chuck, and Carly's ex-boyfriend Griffin. Freddie meets a girl named Sabrina he talked to online and things become awkward when he finds out that she is taller than he expected since he had not seen her in person. Carly has a project she is working on for school and tries to make sure that no one destroys it. In the end, Sabrina destroys the project accidentally after Freddie squirts lemon juice in her eyes by mistake. Meanwhile, Spencer develops a crush on Chuck's sister.
