= BooG!e =

American actor and businessman

- Born: September 14, 1981 (age 45)
- Occupations: Actor, podcaster, streamer, businessman
- Years active: 2001–present

Bobbie K. Bowman (born September 14, 1981), known by his alias BooG!e or Boogie (/ˈbuː.ɡi/), is an American film and television actor, podcaster, and businessman. He is best known for portraying T-Bo in the Nickelodeon teen sitcom television series iCarly (2009–2011), and Billy in the Disney XD children's comedy series Gamer's Guide to Pretty Much Everything (2015–2016). He also runs YouTube and Twitch channels, and publishes podcasts.

== Biography ==
Bobbie Bowman, better known by his alias BooG!e or Boogie, was born on September 14, 1981. His first film appearance was a minor role in the 2001 thriller drama direct-to-video film Jacked Up. In 2003, he was a substitute co-host in an episode of the MTV game show The Wade Robson Project. He and Wade Robson also hosted the PULSE tour, a series of weekend workshops designed to provide rising commercial dancers a chance to train under top choreographers, held nationwide in the United States. Boogie has starred in episodes of the NBC detective sitcom series Andy Barker, P.I. in 2007, and the FOX medical drama series House in 2008, as well as in the 2008 dance film Step Up 2: The Streets. He is best known for his role as T-Bo in the Nickelodeon teen sitcom television series iCarly (2009–2011), and Billy in the Disney XD children's comedy series Gamer's Guide to Pretty Much Everything (2015–2016).

He also runs a YouTube and Twitch channel, where, among other projects, he posts his podcasts, Storytime with Boogie, and The Hollywood University Stereo Podcast. In March 2024, he interviewed Dan Schneider, in response to the latter's allegations of misconduct, presented in the documentary series Quiet on Set: The Dark Side of Kids TV. Boogie also owns a nightclub in Hollywood, in Los Angeles, California.

In January 2026, Boogie launched his brand of bagels, named Bronco Breakfast Bagels. Videos of him promoting the brand went viral on the social media. In them, he is shown offering the bagels presented on a stick, to customers in a Target supermarket store, while dressed reminiscent to his character on iCarly, T-Bo. In the series, his characteristic running gag was offering various foods, including bagels, to customers, which were presented or impaled on a stick.

== Personal life ==
He resides in Los Angeles, California.

== Filmography ==
Year	Title	Role	Notes
2001	Jacked Up	Louise	Feature film
2003	The Wade Robson Project	Himself (co-host)	Game show; episode aired on September 9, 2003
2005	MTV Cribs	Himself (guest)	Reality show; episode aired on May 31, 2005
2007	Andy Barker, P.I.	Rasta Dude	Television series; episode: "Three Days of the Chicken"
2007	Universal Remote	Arguing person	Feature film
2008	House	Dreadlocks	Television series; episode: "House's Head"
2008	Step Up 2: The Streets	DJ Sand	Feature film
2009–2012	iCarly	T-Bo	Television series; recurring role; 25 episodes
2011	iCarly	The Panda	Television series; episode: "iParty with Victorious"
2012	The Prayer	The Prayer	Short film
2015–2016	Gamer's Guide to Pretty Much Everything	Billy	Television series; recurring role; 6 episodes
