= ICarly =

American teen sitcom

iCarly
- Genre: Teen sitcom
- Created by: Dan Schneider
- Showrunner: Dan Schneider
- Starring: Miranda Cosgrove; Jennette McCurdy; Nathan Kress; Jerry Trainor; Noah Munck
- Theme music composer: Michael Corcoran
- Opening theme: "Leave It All to Me", performed by Miranda Cosgrove and Drake Bell
- Composers: Michael Corcoran; Jason L. Mattia
- Country of origin: United States
- Original language: English
- No. of seasons: 6
- No. of episodes: 97 (list of episodes)

Production
- Executive producer: Dan Schneider
- Producers: Joe Catania; Bruce Rand Berman (seasons 2–6); Jake Farrow (seasons 5–6); Matt Fleckenstein (seasons 5–6); Arthur Gradstein (seasons 5–6)
- Production locations: Nickelodeon on Sunset; KTLA Studios
- Cinematography: Mike Spodnik; Wayne Kennan
- Camera setup: Videotape (filmized); Multi-camera
- Running time: 23 minutes (regular episode)
- Production companies: Schneider's Bakery; Nickelodeon Productions

Original release
- Network: Nickelodeon
- Release: September 8, 2007 – November 23, 2012

Related
- Sam & Cat (2013–2014) iCarly (2021–2023)

iCarly is an American teen sitcom created by Dan Schneider, which originally aired on Nickelodeon from September 8, 2007, to November 23, 2012.

The series centers on Carly Shay, a Seattle-based teenager who creates and hosts her own web show called iCarly with her best friends, Sam Puckett and Freddie Benson, in the apartment loft that she and her older brother, Spencer, live in. As the web show quickly becomes an internet phenomenon, the characters are tasked with balancing their normal teenage lives with the wacky situations their newfound fame lands them in. By the fourth season, their school friend Gibby (Note: Munck played Gibby and had a supporting role for the first three seasons, before being promoted to a main cast member in the fourth season.) also works with them on the web show.

It was nominated five times for the Primetime Emmy Award for Outstanding Children's Program. Although the show received mixed reviews from critics, it became popular with audiences, winning the Kids' Choice Award for Favorite TV Show for three consecutive years from 2009 to 2011. The January 2010 episode "iSaved Your Life" reached 11.2 million viewers, the second most viewed telecast in Nickelodeon history.

In December 2020, Paramount+ ordered a revival of the series, with Miranda Cosgrove, Nathan Kress, and Jerry Trainor. It premiered on June 17, 2021.

== Premise ==
When Carly Shay and her best friend Sam Puckett improvise comedy at a school talent show audition, tech-savvy Freddie Benson records it and posts it online without informing them. After seeing the girls' strong chemistry and banter, the online audience clamors for more, and thus they decide to create and host their own web show called iCarly. The trio find their normal adolescent lives thrown for a loop when they discover that they have become online sensations as their show – which features talent contests, recipes, problem-solving, and random dancing – garners international accolades.

Carly lives in Seattle with her adult brother and guardian Spencer and produces the show in a makeshift third-floor studio loft in their apartment. Their father, Steven Shay, is a United States Air Force officer stationed on a submarine, and is often mentioned, but is only seen during the series' finale episode, "iGoodbye".

== Characters ==
=== Main ===
Season 4 main characters: (left to right) Gibby (Noah Munck), Spencer Shay (Jerry Trainor), Carly Shay (Miranda Cosgrove), Freddie Benson (Nathan Kress) and Sam Puckett (Jennette McCurdy)

- Carly Shay (Miranda Cosgrove) is the host of her own popular web show, iCarly, which she produces with her two best friends, Sam and Freddie.
- Sam Puckett (Jennette McCurdy) is one of Carly's best friends and co-host of iCarly.
- Freddie Benson (Nathan Kress) is also one of Carly's good friends and neighbor. He is the technical producer of iCarly.
- Spencer Shay (Jerry Trainor) is Carly's older brother and legal guardian.
- Gibby (Noah Munck; seasons 4-6; recurring: seasons 1-3) is an odd friend of Carly, Sam, and Freddie.

=== Recurring ===
- Marissa Benson (Mary Scheer) is Freddie's overbearing and overprotective mother (often referred to by Sam as Freddie's "freakish mother").
- Charlotte (Deena Dill) is Gibby's and Guppy's loving and sometimes overprotective mother. Charlotte dates Spencer, but after their breakup, she tries to avoid him. She is a doting mother and often embarrasses Gibby.
- Lewbert Sline (Jeremy Rowley) is the doorman for the building in which Carly, Spencer, and Freddie live, characterized by his annoying, protective behavior and a large wart on his face. He is often being pranked on iCarly.
- Nevel Papperman (Reed Alexander) is a critic who runs the nevelocity.com website, a site that reviews other websites, including iCarly.com. He is Carly's nemesis and has constantly tried to sabotage iCarly in exchange for a kiss from Carly.
- T-Bo (Bobby "BooG!e" Bowman) is the manager at the Groovy Smoothie. He often annoys customers into buying random foods (i.e. bell peppers, bagels, tacos), which are always impaled on a stick. Starting in the episode, "iQ", he began renting a room from Freddie's mother.
- Guppy (Ethan Munck) is Gibby's younger brother and often tags along with Gibby.
- Chuck Chambers (Ryan Ochoa) is a child in the Shays' apartment building who frequently torments Spencer and turned into one of Carly's nemeses after lying to her when she was tutoring him. He also has a little brother called Chip Chambers that also torments Spencer and Carly.
- Principal Ted Franklin (Tim Russ) is the principal at Ridgeway Secondary School, the school where Carly, Sam, and Freddie attend. He is very lenient and is also a big fan of iCarly.
- Ms. Francine Briggs (Mindy Sterling) is a very strict English teacher at Ridgeway Secondary School who shows an obvious dislike for children.
- Mr. Howard (David St. James) is a strict and unenthusiastic teacher who hates almost everything including his wife.
- Nora Dershlit (Danielle Morrow) is an obsessive and insane iCarly fan with a chicken named Maurice. In the past, she had trapped the iCarly cast in her home against their will. She has made appearances on the episodes "iPsycho" and "iStillPsycho". She also appeared in an episode of Sam & Cat titled "#SuperPsycho".

== Production ==
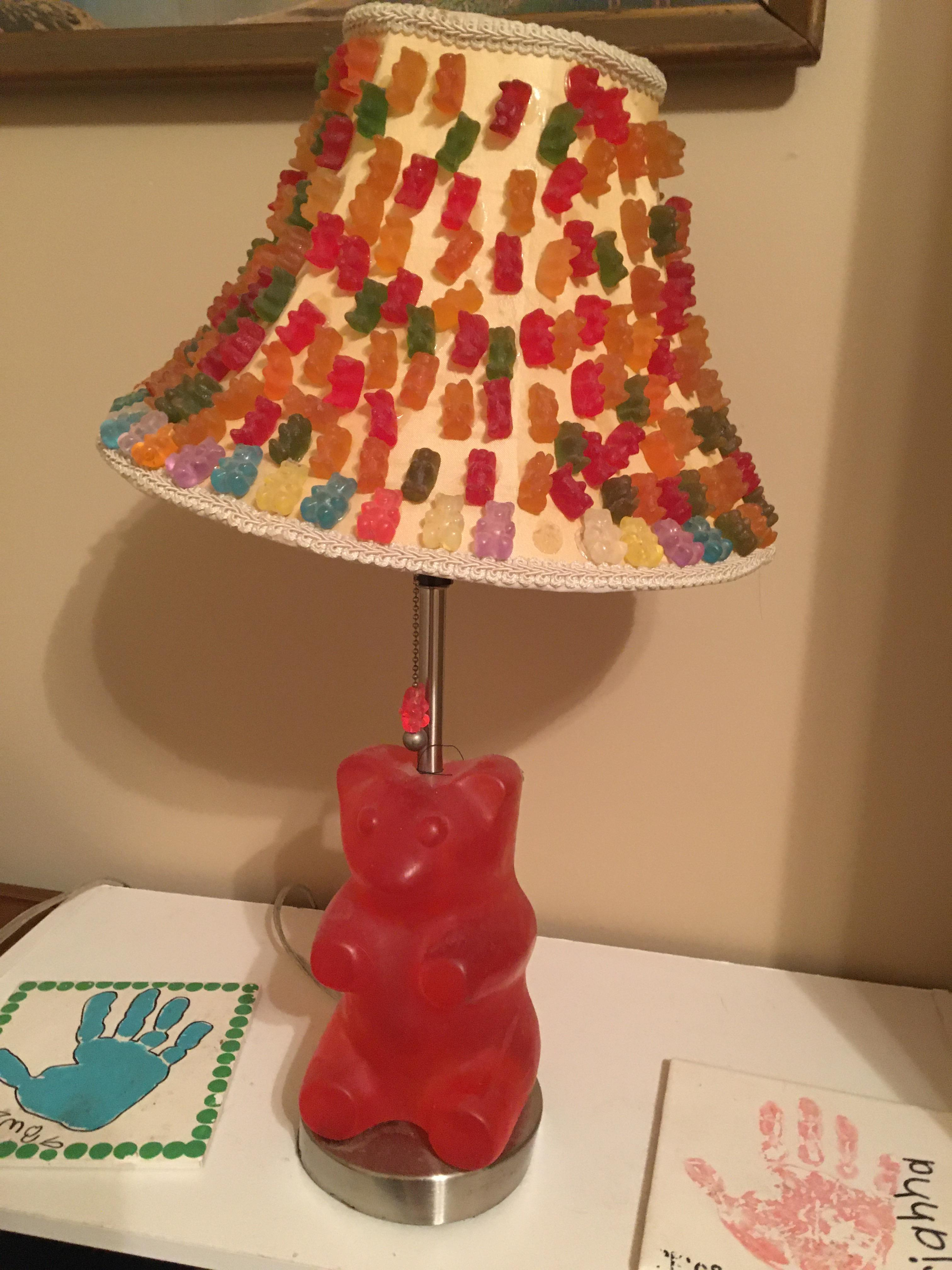
The gummi bear lamp from iGot a Hot Room

=== Development ===
iCarly is the fourth series created by Dan Schneider for Nickelodeon. After working with her on Drake & Josh, Schneider began pitching a new TV series starring Miranda Cosgrove; the show was specifically created for her, as Schneider had seen her become "prettier" and a better actress. The original idea of the show was that she plays a normal girl who, in a twist of fate, gets cast to star in her favorite TV show, Starstruck. However, during a casual meeting in his den with his wife and his friend Steve Molaro, Schneider decided that it would be much better if Carly had her own web show. The rise of the video platform YouTube inspired this concept; Schneider believed it was "much cooler and more motivating for many reasons," as it gave Carly the freedom to do things her way and "kids could relate to that." In November 2006, Schneider then scrapped his Starstruck script and began developing a new pilot called iCarly during December. The pilot was filmed in January 2007. The series was filmed at the Nickelodeon on Sunset (now Earl Carroll Theatre). The exterior shots of the Shays' apartment building, Bushwell Plaza, are digitally altered images of the Eastern Columbia Building in Los Angeles.

During production of Zoey 101, Schneider came up with the idea of the show and its name with his friend and producer of The Big Bang Theory, Steven Molaro. He was trying to think of a good title for the new series about kids who start their own web show. The pilot script followed a lead girl named "Sam" but the URL for iSam was already taken. Schneider tried other girls' names and bought the URL for iJosie, but eventually changed it to iCarly and enjoyed the name for the lead character. The names of the lead girls were then changed from Sam and Kira to Carly and Sam.

=== Final seasons ===
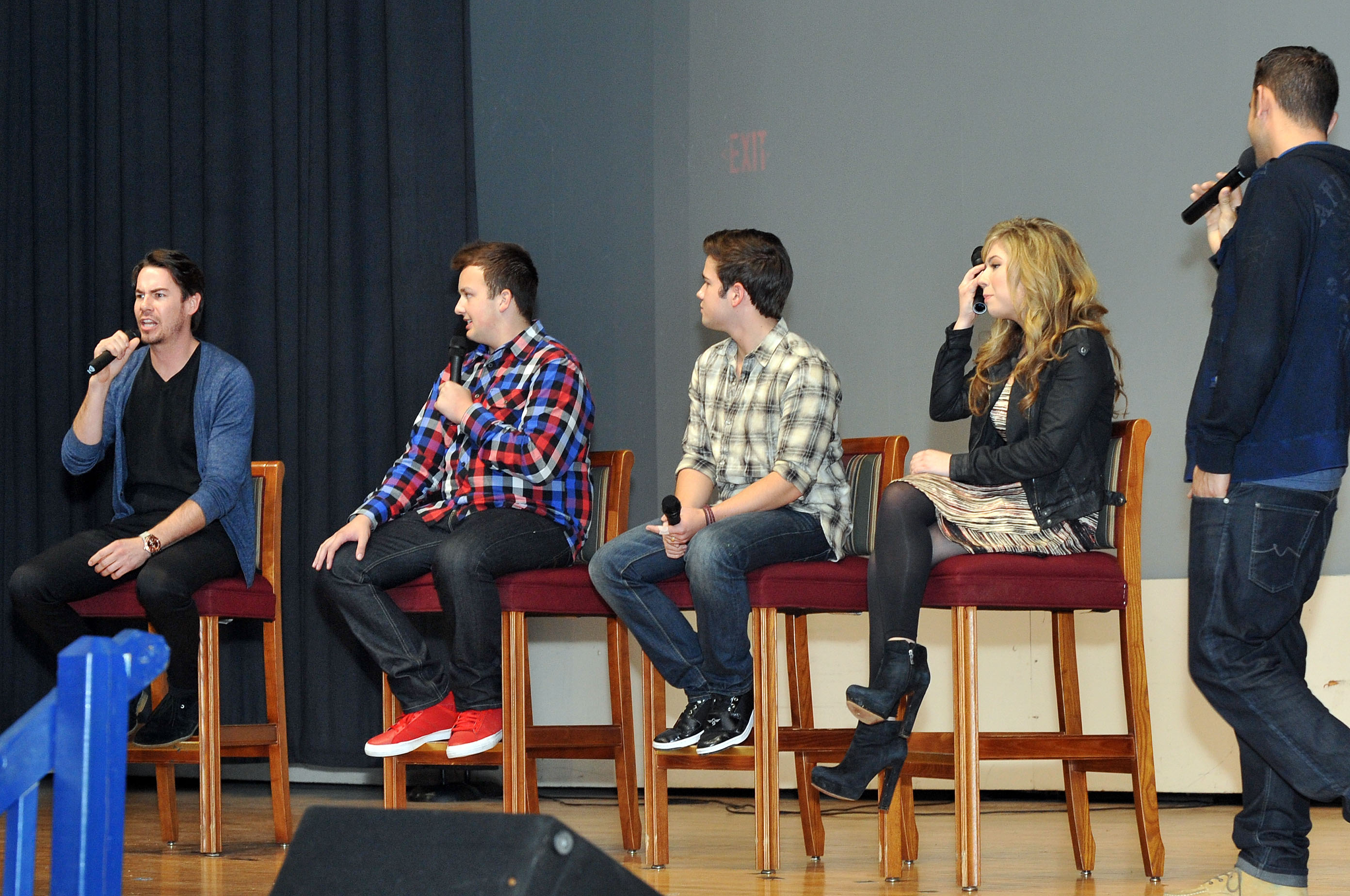
The iCarly cast at Joint Base McGuire-Dix-Lakehurst in 2012

In late January 2011, while doing press for her North American Dancing Crazy concert tour, Miranda Cosgrove began telling news sources that she was looking forward to returning to Hollywood to begin filming a fifth season of iCarly. On January 27, 2011, Cosgrove told Cleveland Live News "We're getting ready to start the next season, right after the tour. I would be willing to do the show as long as people like it and as long as it works." On January 28, 2011, Reuters news agency also reported that Cosgrove was preparing to begin filming a fifth season of iCarly, and on February 3, 2011, Cosgrove told The Middletown Press, when speaking of the show and her co-stars Jennette McCurdy and Nathan Kress, "I've known them since I was little. I can't wait to get back. I'm really comfortable doing iCarly. It's like my home away from home." Cosgrove concluded her Dancing Crazy concert tour on February 24, 2011, and Jennette McCurdy finished her Generation Love mall tour on April 14, 2011. The entire cast did not even get together until the 2011 Kids' Choice Awards. Cosgrove confirmed that filming would resume shortly. At the 2011 Kids' Choice Awards, Jerry Trainor stated that filming would resume in May.

On April 14, 2011, Nickelodeon officially announced the fifth and final production season renewal of iCarly to begin in 2012 with the episodes airing later that year. These episodes would air as the show's sixth season due to the second season production of 45 episodes being split into two broadcast seasons. The third production season originally consisted of 26 episodes as ordered in early 2010; however, half that number was shot from May to September 2010 that aired as the show's fourth season. Dan Schneider then shot the next half in May to July 2011 which became a whole new season production that aired as the show's fifth season later that year. However, due to Miranda's leave for a tour on July 15, 2011, only eleven episodes were produced and the last two were held over and produced during filming of the show's final season.

The final season began on March 24, 2012, with a total of fifteen episodes produced and the final production ending in June of that same year. Some of the shots for season six were filmed at KTLA Studios (now Old Warner Brothers Studios). However, there was a four-month hiatus after six episodes of the season aired from March to June. "iShock America" was promoted as the start of the "final season" of iCarly, effectively splitting the season into two parts. The series ended on November 23, 2012, with the episode "iGoodbye".

=== Revival ===
On December 9, 2020, it was announced that Paramount+ had ordered a revival of the series, with Cosgrove, Kress, and Trainor returning and Schneider not being involved with the production of the series. Jay Kogen and Ali Schouten signed on to develop the series. McCurdy suggested during her podcast that she will not reprise her role on the series, as she has left the acting profession and felt embarrassed by her past career. On February 25, 2021, it was reported that Kogen left the project due to "creative differences" with Cosgrove. On March 18, 2021, the show entered production, with Laci Mosley playing Carly's new best friend and roommate Harper, and Jaidyn Triplett playing Freddie's stepdaughter Millicent. The series premiered on June 17, 2021.

According to DiscussingFilm, the series revival takes place 10 years after the original Nickelodeon show, following Carly's journey through her twenties alongside returning characters played by Jerry Trainor and Nathan Kress. Jennette McCurdy's Sam does not return with the show reportedly set to introduce a new best friend character in her place. The best friend/roommate is "part of the LGBTQ+ community as a pansexual character who dreams of becoming a fashion stylist after her wealthy family lost all of their money." The series also introduces Freddie's social media-obsessed stepdaughter who sees Carly as "washed up" and as competition to her own growing influencer status.

On October 4, 2023, the series was canceled after three seasons. A follow-up film is reportedly in development.

=== Work environment allegations ===
In her 2022 memoir, I'm Glad My Mom Died, McCurdy described iCarly as an unsafe work environment, alleging that someone she referred to only as "The Creator" had subjected the cast and crew to frequent emotional abuse, pressured her into underage drinking, massaged her nonconsensually, and was eventually barred from interacting directly with the cast in response to complaints about his behavior. Shortly after McCurdy's allegations were made, Buzzfeed News and Vox both identified Schneider as "The Creator". McCurdy has claimed that after working with Nickelodeon, she turned down "hush money" from the network, which had been allegedly offered to her on the condition that she remain silent about her experiences with Schneider. She expressed outrage at the offer, writing in her memoir, "This is a network with shows made for children. Shouldn't they have some sort of moral compass? Shouldn't they at least try to report to some sort of ethical standard?" Both Schneider and Nickelodeon have turned down requests for comment.

== Episodes ==
Compilation of clips from each iCarly episode by NickRewind

Season	Episodes		Originally released	
Season	Episodes		First released	Last released
1	25		September 8, 2007	July 25, 2008
2	21		September 27, 2008	August 8, 2009
3	18		September 12, 2009	June 26, 2010
4	10		July 30, 2010	June 11, 2011
5	10		August 13, 2011	January 21, 2012
6	13	6	March 24, 2012	June 9, 2012
6	13	7	October 6, 2012	November 23, 2012

=== Special episodes ===
Title	Type	Air date	Synopsis	Viewers (millions)
"iDate a Bad Boy"	Two-part special	May 9, 2009	When Spencer's motorcycle is "stolen" by Griffin, their new neighbor who claims he was only "borrowing" it, Carly immediately hates him for his wrongdoing whereas Spencer gives him a chance and drops the charges. Eventually, much to Carly's dismay, Spencer begins mentoring Griffin. However, after getting to know him, Carly actually falls for Griffin and makes out with him passionately. Spencer walks in on them and becomes angry and grounds her until college. Eventually, Spencer realizes he was being over-protective and allows them to resume dating, as long as they don't take their relationship too far. While they are dating, however, Carly finds out a big secret about Griffin that she does not like at all; he collects "PeeWee Babies". This leaves Carly conflicted, and she has to decide if she should continue dating him or end their relationship. Elsewhere, Freddie attempts to build Sam a website after making a contract deal with her, and Sam experiences nightmares about a monster eating her soup, leading Spencer to help her get over her dream through confrontation.	7.1
"iFight Shelby Marx"	Two-part special	August 8, 2009	When Carly jokingly challenges the champion martial arts fighter, Shelby Marx, during a web show, Shelby arrives at the Shay loft along with her manager, etc., to accept her challenge. It turns out to be the manager's idea and it is not a real fight, but an exhibition fight intended for fun. However, during a press conference, Carly accidentally knocks Shelby's grandmother down during a mock fight, which Shelby takes really seriously, prompting her to decide to fight for real. Later, Carly explains that it was all an accident and that she was pushed. Shelby accepts her apology, they make up, and the fight is an exhibition match once again. Elsewhere, Spencer has allergies and a doctor gives him pills to get rid of them forever. However, he must first be able to cope with troublesome side effects for a certain period of time.	7.9
"iQuit iCarly"	Two-part special	December 5, 2009	After the iCarly crew agrees to help the web show hosts for the Fleck and Dave Show, they make a video for a website video contest. Fleck and Dave fight which leaves their friendship in jeopardy due to their conflicts with each other. The iCarly crew attempts to bring them back together as friends, which only leads to conflict for Carly and Sam when their comparison of conflicts with each other with Fleck and Dave's conflicts eventually breaks them up, even to the point where the web show is put in jeopardy. Elsewhere, Spencer becomes determined to win a boat through a televised contest in which a contestant must be able to answer the most boat-themed questions correctly and send them in, which Spencer eventually wins. Gibby tags along in his attempt to find parking for the boat, only to stumble upon a mishap with someone else's parkway space and lose the boat through force to the person's baseball team.	10.0
"iPsycho"	Two-part special	June 4, 2010	The iCarly crew is getting ready for Webicon when they stumble upon an iCarly video mail from a girl named Nora Dirshlitt. She has a somewhat sad life and invites the iCarly crew to her upcoming birthday party. Feeling sympathetic, the crew divides their time to take a trip to Webicon to attend Nora's birthday party. The clown at the party suffers an aneurysm and is immediately hospitalized, with no guarantee of surviving, leaving Nora very sad. Feeling very sorry for Nora, the gang decides to do a web show in order to convince Nora's peers at School that the crew are really at her party. After the party, Nora decides to take advantage of the crew and locks them up in a basement studio hoping this will boost her popularity and help her gain more friends, leaving Carly, Sam, and Freddie in a sticky situation – from which they must escape. Elsewhere, Gibby decides to camp at the Shay loft, after not being able to attend his camp for another year due to age.	8.2
"iStart a Fan War"	Two-part special	November 19, 2010	The iCarly crew once again head to Webicon for a panel, while Carly has a crush on a guy named Adam at Ridgeway High School. While Carly converses with Adam via video chat, Adam mentions that fans create forums and discuss whether Freddie should be with Carly or Sam. The fans call themselves "Creddies" and "Seddies". During the panel at Webicon, Sam starts a fan war between Creddies and Seddies which gets out of hand. This not only makes things bad at the panel, but makes things bad for Carly and Adam's connection. Meanwhile, Spencer tags along with them at Webicon dressed as Aruthor from "World of Warlords" to win a costume contest, only to meet a man dressed as Aruthor's mortal enemy, Aspartamay.	5.0
"iStill Psycho"	Two-part special	December 31, 2011	Nora is released from prison, and is having a welcome home party. The iCarly gang rushes to court to try to keep Nora behind bars at any cost but fail. The iCarly trio plus Spencer and Gibby go to the party, but this time Nora and the rest of her family are in on trapping them. Freddie finds a way to contact his mother, but will she be able to save the day?	5.5
"iShock America"	Two-part special	October 6, 2012	Jimmy Fallon invites the gang to New York after Carly dedicates a webshow to him parodying his famous skits. Gibby bought street pants and caused a few problems during the show. While the gang starts dancing, Gibby's street pants fall down and he isn't wearing underwear, causing the NCC to show up. People start to blame Jimmy for the incident by saying he deliberately wanted Gibby's pants to fall. Carly and her friends do an episode of iCarly saying it was their fault and not Jimmy's. They have to pay $500,000 or the NCC will shut down iCarly. So Jimmy blogs asking America for their spare change to help the iCarly gang get $500,000. Jimmy got the iCarly gang to the studios and the fans got them more than $500,000.	3.6
"iGoodbye"	Two-part special	November 23, 2012	Carly is expecting her father Colonel Shay to arrive in Seattle to escort her to the Father-Daughter Air Force Dance, only to receive his email saying he will actually be unable to make it. To comfort her, Spencer asks to escort her to the dance, and she accepts. Meanwhile, prior to the dance, he attempts to repair a motorcycle for Socko's cousin Ryder. Sam instantly marvels at the vehicle and volunteers to assist Spencer in fixing it. Shortly after this, however, Spencer becomes sick from being sneezed on by Lewbert, the apartment building's doorman, and is unable to take his sister to the dance. Elsewhere, Freddie and Gibby are at the mall to create a replica of the latter's head, after losing his original copy at a pawn shop in Las Vegas. They are informed by Sam over the phone of Spencer's illness and offer to escort Carly to the dance, to which she cries as a sign of rejecting the offer. Colonel Shay arrives at Carly's home, much to her sudden and pleasant surprise, and escorts her to the dance. Upon returning, Colonel Shay informs everyone that he has to return to his base in Italy and invites her to travel with him. Despite her initial reluctance, Carly accepts the offer, and the gang streams their last iCarly webcast together with Colonel Shay present. Sam receives the motorcycle from Spencer after Socko changes his mind about giving it to his cousin. Carly and Freddie kiss each other for the last time in the iCarly studio alone before she departs. On an airplane, Carly is seen viewing a montage of archived iCarly webcasts as she and her dad are bound towards Italy. This is the final episode of the iCarly series.	6.4

== Television film ==
On November 8, 2008, iGo to Japan, the film based on iCarly, premiered on Nickelodeon. It has also been broadcast divided in three-parts of second season that serve as the first film of the series. The television movie stars Miranda Cosgrove, Jennette McCurdy, Nathan Kress and Jerry Trainor. The film was directed by Steve Hoefer. The production of the film began in the spring of 2008, and lasted around 4 to 5 weeks. In the story, after the iCarly crew is nominated for "Best Comedy Category", Carly, Sam, Freddie, Spencer, and Mrs. Benson fly away to Japan to attend the iWeb Awards show. However, their trip soon turns into an adventure with many twists after meeting with their competing webshow hosts Kyoko and Yuki.

== Crossover film ==
Title	Type	Air date	Synopsis	Viewers (millions)
"iParty with Victorious"	Three-part special	June 11, 2011	Carly is happier than ever since she is now in a steady relationship with a boy named Steven, in which nothing goes wrong. He divides his time between his divorced parents in Seattle and Los Angeles. Unknown to the iCarly gang, Steven goes to Los Angeles where it is revealed that he is dating another girl named Tori Vega (from Victorious) at the same time. However, Robbie Shapiro (also from Victorious), posts a picture to TheSlap.com of Steven and Tori together. Sam immediately suspects he is dating another girl, leading the iCarly crew to head to Los Angeles on an adventure to set things straight after seeing an open invite online from Rex (from Victorious) to a party by Andre Harris (from Victorious) thanks to Kenan Thompson, where the gang meets with the Victorious gang.	7.3

== Broadcast ==
=== International ===
The series aired on Nickelodeon worldwide. In Canada, it premiered on October 8, 2007, on YTV and on November 2, 2009, on the original channel, and ended on December 1, 2012, on the former. In Australia and New Zealand it premiered on October 29, 2007, and ended on April 13, 2013. It premiered on March 8, 2008, and ended on April 5, 2013, in the United Kingdom and Ireland.

== Home media ==
ICarly DVD releases are distributed by Paramount Home Entertainment under the Nickelodeon label.

Note: The season DVDs are released according to the five production seasons.

DVD title	Region 1	Discs	Episodes	Extras
iCarly: Season 1, Vol. 1	September 23, 2008	2	1–12, 16	"Leave It All to Me" by Miranda Cosgrove
iCarly: Season 1, Vol. 2	April 21, 2009	2	13–15, 17–25	Behind the Slime with the cast of iCarly; Behind-the-Scenes Extras; Pilot episode of True Jackson, VP
iCarly: Season 2, Vol. 1	August 18, 2009	2	26–38	Featurette for The Making of "iGo to Japan" & Behind The Scenes with the iCarly Cast on Season 2!
iCarly: iFight Shelby Marx	March 30, 2010	1	"iFight Shelby Marx", "iDate a Bad Boy", "iLook Alike", "iCarly Awards"	Special bonus episode: Pilot episode of Big Time Rush
iCarly: iSaved Your Life	June 8, 2010	1	"iSaved Your Life", "iQuit iCarly", "iThink They Kissed", "iTwins", "iMove Out"	Behind the scenes with the cast of iCarly; iQuit iCarly window stunt; Meet Chuck; Favourite Birthday moments; Welcome to my boat
iCarly: iSpace Out	August 31, 2010	1	"iSpace Out", "iWas a Pageant Girl", "iEnrage Gibby", "iBelieve in Bigfoot", "iFix a Popstar", "iWon't Cancel The Show"	Special bonus episode: Pilot episode of Victorious
iCarly: Season 2, Vol. 2	January 4, 2011	2	39–52	Behind the Scenes with the Cast
iCarly: Season 2, Vol. 3	April 5, 2011	3	53–70	Special bonus episode: Pilot episode of T.U.F.F. Puppy iSaved Your Life – Extended Version
iCarly: The i <3 iCarly Collection	July 19, 2011	3	Collection includes all of "iSpace Out", "iSaved Your Life", and "iFight Shelby Marx" DVDs released previously separately	Special bonus episode: Pilot episode of Big Time Rush. Behind the scenes with the cast of iCarly; iQuit iCarly window stunt; Meet Chuck; Favorite Birthday moments; Welcome to my boat. Special bonus episode: Pilot episode of Victorious
iCarly: The Complete 3rd Season	August 30, 2011	2	71–83	Carly's Hot New Room Tour, Meet Sam's Mother, Archenemies profiles
iCarly: The Complete 4th Season	July 10, 2012	2	84–94	5 Bonus Episodes of How to Rock

== Reception ==
=== Critical ===
Carey Bryson of About.com gave the show 2 1/2 stars, concluding "The show's comedic elements don't all rest on the irreverent, though, there are some clever storylines and even a few touching moments. Overall, the show has some great comedy, interesting stories, and fun actors." The show was awarded 3 stars by Common Sense Media reviewer Emily Ashby, who said that "[t]he show isn't designed to be educational, per se, but young viewers will learn a bit about interacting with media."

Hollywood.com's Michelle Lee said, "Like the Lost fan rejecting every Lost-like show that came after it, I resented all of the shaky single-camera docu-style comedies that came after [Arrested Development]. Because, frankly, my favorite dead show did it better. I needed something completely different to break me out of my comedy funk and get me back on that horse. And it worked."

=== U.S. television ratings ===
The pilot episode debuted on Nickelodeon on September 8, 2007, to an audience of 4.1 million viewers, followed by the second episode "iWant More Viewers" on the same day with 3.9 million viewers. The most-watched episode is "iSaved Your Life" which aired January 18, 2010, to 11.2 million viewers which is also the second most-viewed telecast in Nickelodeon history. On June 9, 2012, iCarly had the lowest viewership of a premiere ever, with only 2.4 million viewers.

Ratings table
Season	Network	Timeslot	Season premiere	Season finale	Episode #	Viewers (in millions)	Most watched episode	
Season	Network	Timeslot	Season premiere	Season finale	Episode #	Viewers (in millions)	Title	Viewers (in millions)
Season 1	Nickelodeon	Saturdays, 8/7c	September 8, 2007	July 25, 2008	25	N/A		
Season 2	Nickelodeon	Saturdays, 8/7c	September 27, 2008	August 8, 2009	25	4.97	"iFight Shelby Marx"	7.9
Season 3	Nickelodeon	Saturdays, 8/7c	September 12, 2009	June 26, 2010	20	5.57	"iSaved Your Life"	11.2
Season 4	Nickelodeon	Saturdays, 8/7c	July 30, 2010	June 11, 2011	13	6.07	"iOMG"	8.8
Season 5	Nickelodeon	Saturdays, 8/7c	August 13, 2011	January 21, 2012	11	4.35	"iLost My Mind	5.5
Season 6	Nickelodeon	Saturdays, 8/7c	March 24, 2012	June 9, 2012	6	3.02	"iGo One Direction"	3.9
Season 6	Nickelodeon	Saturdays, 8/7c	October 6, 2012	November 23, 2012	9	3.87	iGoodbye	6.4

=== Awards and nominations ===
In 2010 and 2011, it debuted the Kids Choice Awards Latin America, Kids Choice Awards México, and Kids Choice Awards Argentina. These awards are new.

iCarly was part of these awards (Mexico Kids Choice Awards, Kids Choice Awards Argentina) because the series still did not finish until 2012.

Year	Award	Category	Recipient	Result	Ref.
2008	2008 Kids' Choice Awards	Favorite TV Show	iCarly	Nominated	
2008	2008 UK Kids' Choice Awards	Favorite Kids' TV Show	iCarly	Nominated	
2008	2008 Australian Kids' Choice Awards	Fave Comedy Show	iCarly	Nominated	
2008	British Academy Children's Awards	International	iCarly	Nominated	
2008	Casting Society of America	Outstanding Achievement in Casting - Children's Series Programming	Sharon Chazin Lieblein; Leah Buono; Krisha Bullock	Nominated	
2009	2009 Kids' Choice Awards	Favorite TV Show	iCarly	Won	
2009	2009 Australian Kids' Choice Awards	Fave Comedy Show	iCarly	Won	
2009	Primetime Emmy Awards	Outstanding Children's Program	iCarly	Nominated	
2009	Teen Choice Awards	Choice TV Show: Comedy	iCarly	Nominated	
2009	Young Artist Awards	Outstanding Young Performers in a TV Series	Miranda Cosgrove; Nathan Kress; Jennette McCurdy; Noah Munck	Nominated	
2009	British Academy Children's Awards	BAFTA Kid's Vote: TV	iCarly	Nominated	
2009	Casting Society of America	Outstanding Achievement in Casting - Children's Series Programming	Krisha Bullock	Nominated	
2010	2010 Kids' Choice Awards	Favorite TV Show	iCarly	Won	
2010	2010 Australian Kids' Choice Awards	Fave TV Show	iCarly	Won	
2010	2010 Australian Kids' Choice Awards	LOL Award	Miranda Cosgrove; Nathan Kress; Jennette McCurdy; Jerry Trainor; Noah Munck	Won	
2010	Primetime Emmy Awards	Outstanding Children's Program	iCarly	Nominated	
2010	Television Critics Association Awards	Outstanding Achievement in Youth Programming	iCarly	Nominated	
2010	Young Artist Awards	Outstanding Young Performers in a TV Series	Miranda Cosgrove; Nathan Kress; Jennette McCurdy; Noah Munck	Nominated	
2010	Hollywood Teen TV Awards	Teen Show Pick: Comedy	iCarly	Nominated	
2010	Kids' Choice Awards Mexico 2010	Favorite Show	iCarly	Won	
2010	Meus Prêmios Nick Brazil 2010	Favorite TV Show	iCarly	Won	
2010	British Academy Children's Awards	BAFTA Kid's Vote: TV	iCarly	Nominated	
2010	Casting Society of America	Outstanding Achievement in Casting - Children's Series Programming	Krisha Bullock	Nominated	
2011	2011 Kids' Choice Awards	Favorite TV Show	iCarly	Won	
2011	2011 UK Kids' Choice Awards	Nick UK's Favourite Show	iCarly	Nominated	
2011	2011 Australian Kids' Choice Awards	Fave TV Show	iCarly	Nominated	
2011	Primetime Emmy Awards	Outstanding Children's Program	iCarly	Nominated	
2011	Primetime Emmy Awards	Outstanding Hairstyling For A Multi-Camera Series Or Special	Episode: iStart A Fan War	Nominated	
2011	Primetime Emmy Awards	Outstanding Makeup For A Multi-Camera Series Or Special (Non-Prosthetic)	Episode: iStart A Fan War	Nominated	
2011	Teen Choice Awards	Choice TV Show: Comedy	iCarly	Nominated	
2011	Teen Choice Awards	Choice TV Actress: Comedy	Miranda Cosgrove	Nominated	
2011	Teen Choice Awards	Choice TV: Female Scene Stealer	Jennette McCurdy	Nominated	
2011	Television Critics Association Awards	Outstanding Achievement in Youth Programming	iCarly	Nominated	
2011	People's Choice Awards	Favorite Family TV Movie	Episode: iPsycho	Nominated	
2011	Youth Rocks Awards	Rockin' Ensemble Cast (TV/Comedy)	iCarly	Nominated	
2011	Kids' Choice Awards Mexico 2011	Favorite International Show	iCarly	Nominated	
2011	Kids' Choice Awards Argentina 2011	Favorite TV International Show	iCarly	Won	
2011	Meus Prêmios Nick Brazil 2011	Favorite TV Show	iCarly	Nominated	
2011	Casting Society of America	Outstanding Achievement in Casting - Children's Series Programming	Krisha Bullock	Nominated	
2012	2012 Kids' Choice Awards	Favorite TV Show	iCarly	Nominated	
2012	Primetime Emmy Awards	Outstanding Children's Program	iCarly	Nominated	
2012	Television Critics Association Awards	Outstanding Achievement in Youth Programming	iCarly	Nominated	
2012	Hollywood Teen TV Awards	Favorite Television Show	iCarly	Nominated	
2012	Writers Guild of America	Children's - Episodic & Specials	Episode: iLost My Mind	Nominated	
2012	Producers Guild Awards	Outstanding Children's Program	iCarly	Nominated	
2012	Kids' Choice Awards Mexico 2012	Favorite International Show	iCarly	Won	
2012	Kids' Choice Awards Argentina 2012	Favorite TV International Show	iCarly	Nominated	
2012	Meus Prêmios Nick Brazil 2012	Favorite TV Show	iCarly	Nominated	
2012	British Academy Children's Awards	International	iCarly	Nominated	
2012	Casting Society of America	Outstanding Achievement in Casting - Children's Series Programming	Krisha Bullock; Jennifer Treadwell	Nominated	
2013	Producers Guild Awards	Outstanding Children's Program	iCarly	Nominated	
2013	2013 Kids' Choice Awards	Favorite TV Show	iCarly	Nominated	
2013	Meus Prêmios Nick Brazil 2013	Favorite TV Show	iCarly	Won	
2013	65th Primetime Creative Arts Emmy Awards	Outstanding Children's Program	iCarly	Nominated	
2014	Producers Guild Awards	Outstanding Children's Program	iCarly	Nominated	
2014	ANMTVLA Awards	Best Children Series in 2013	iCarly	Won	
2014	ANMTV Brazil Awards	Best child and adolescent series exhibited in 2013	iCarly	Won	

== Other media ==
=== Music ===
Columbia Records and Nickelodeon Records have released an eponymous soundtrack for the show, entitled iCarly. It includes the theme song and four original songs by Miranda Cosgrove, several tracks by guest artists, and cast dialogue. A follow-up soundtrack, titled iCarly: iSoundtrack II, was released January 24, 2012.

=== Video games ===
An animated PC hidden object game, iCarly: iDream in Toons, was released by Nickelodeon in 2009. Jerry Trainor is the only actor from the cast who lends his voice to the game, the rest of the characters' speech being dubbed with typing sounds on a keyboard.

On May 13, 2009, Nickelodeon announced they had reached an agreement with Activision to produce an iCarly video game for the Nintendo DS and Wii. The game was released on October 28, 2009. The cast lent their voices in the videogame. A sequel, iCarly 2: iJoin the Click!, was released on November 16, 2010, for the same platforms.

On December 4, 2009, an app was released for iPhone and iPod Touch titled "Sam's Remote", consisting of an interactive version of the remote Sam uses on live casts of iCarly in the show, where one pushes different buttons and they make silly sound effects.

On June 12, 2012, a Nintendo DS game titled "iCarly: Groovy Foodie!" developed by WayForward was released.

=== Products ===
An Apple MacBook and iPhone are parodized with the logo of a pear instead of an Apple. Additionally, the "Pear Phone" is pear-shaped.

== Spin-off series ==
Two spin-off series have been proposed as pilots for Nickelodeon, and were both announced during the network's presentation at the Television Critics Association Summer Press Tour on August 3, 2012.

=== Sam & Cat ===
The first is Sam & Cat, which paired Ariana Grande from Victorious and Jennette McCurdy together in a traditional "buddy sitcom" setting as their characters, Cat Valentine and Sam Puckett. They played roommates who launch a babysitting business together. The show was picked up by Nickelodeon on November 29, 2012, and premiered on June 8, 2013. The series was cancelled on July 13, 2014, with the final episode airing on July 17.

=== Gibby ===
The second proposed spin-off featured Noah Munck's character Gibby Gibson into a self-titled sitcom named Gibby where the character works at a recreation center as a mentor to four middle school students. Even though a pilot was filmed in 2012, Gibby was not picked up as a series, and the pilot episode has never aired. The script was released in 2021 and the full unaired pilot was leaked in 2023.

== See also ==
- Drake & Josh
