= Noah Munck =

American actor (born 1996)

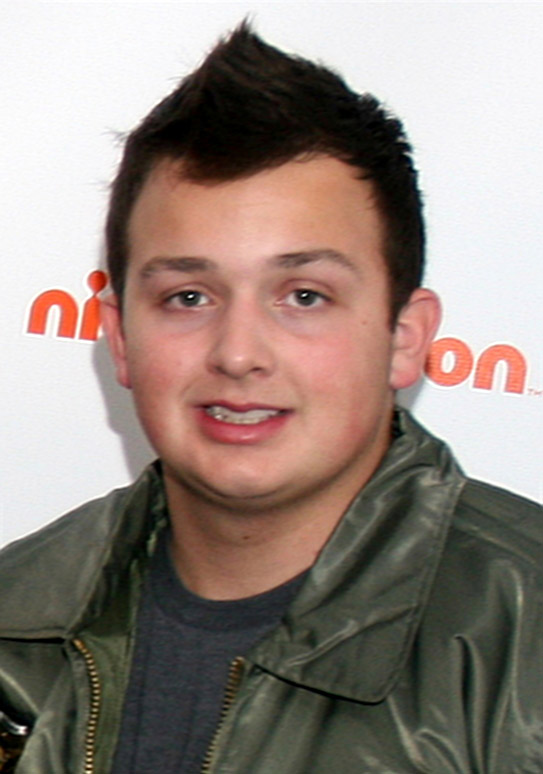
- Munck in 2012
- Born: Noah Bryant Munck; May 3, 1996 (age 30); Mission Viejo, California, U.S.
- Other names: NoxiK; Sadworldbeats; Noah Praise God
- Education: Biola University
- Occupations: Actor; musician; YouTuber
- Years active: 2007–present

Noah Bryant Munck (born May 3, 1996) is an American actor, musician and YouTuber. He is best known for his roles as Gibby in the Nickelodeon sitcom iCarly and "Naked" Rob Smith in the ABC sitcom The Goldbergs. He also releases music under the aliases Sadworldbeats and Noah Praise God and creates independent comedy videos on YouTube.

== Early life ==
Noah Bryant Munck was born and raised in Mission Viejo in Orange County, California. He is the oldest of five children of Kymbry (née Robinson) and Greg Munck, an executive pastor at Crossline Community Church in Laguna Hills. He was involved in his school drama program while filming for iCarly. One of his brothers, Ethan Munck, played Gibby's brother Guppy in five episodes of iCarly. In fall 2014, Munck was accepted to and began attending Biola University as a cinema and media arts major.

== Career ==
=== iCarly ===
In 2007, Munck began a recurring role for three seasons on the Nickelodeon television series iCarly as Gibby, one of Carly, Sam and Freddie's friends. In 2010, Munck was elevated to a regular cast member from the fourth season onwards. In 2011, he was nominated for the "Funniest TV Sidekick" award at the Kids' Choice Awards.

Proposals were put forth in 2013 for a TV series called Gibby, a spin-off of iCarly that would star Munck. The series was to star Gibby working at a recreational center where he mentors four middle-schoolers. The series was not picked up, although Munck reprised the role of Gibby in the spin-off series Sam & Cat in 2014 for the episode "#SuperPsycho". Munck did not return to reprise his role in the 2021 revival series. His brother Ethan, however, reprised his role as Guppy in one episode of the revival series.

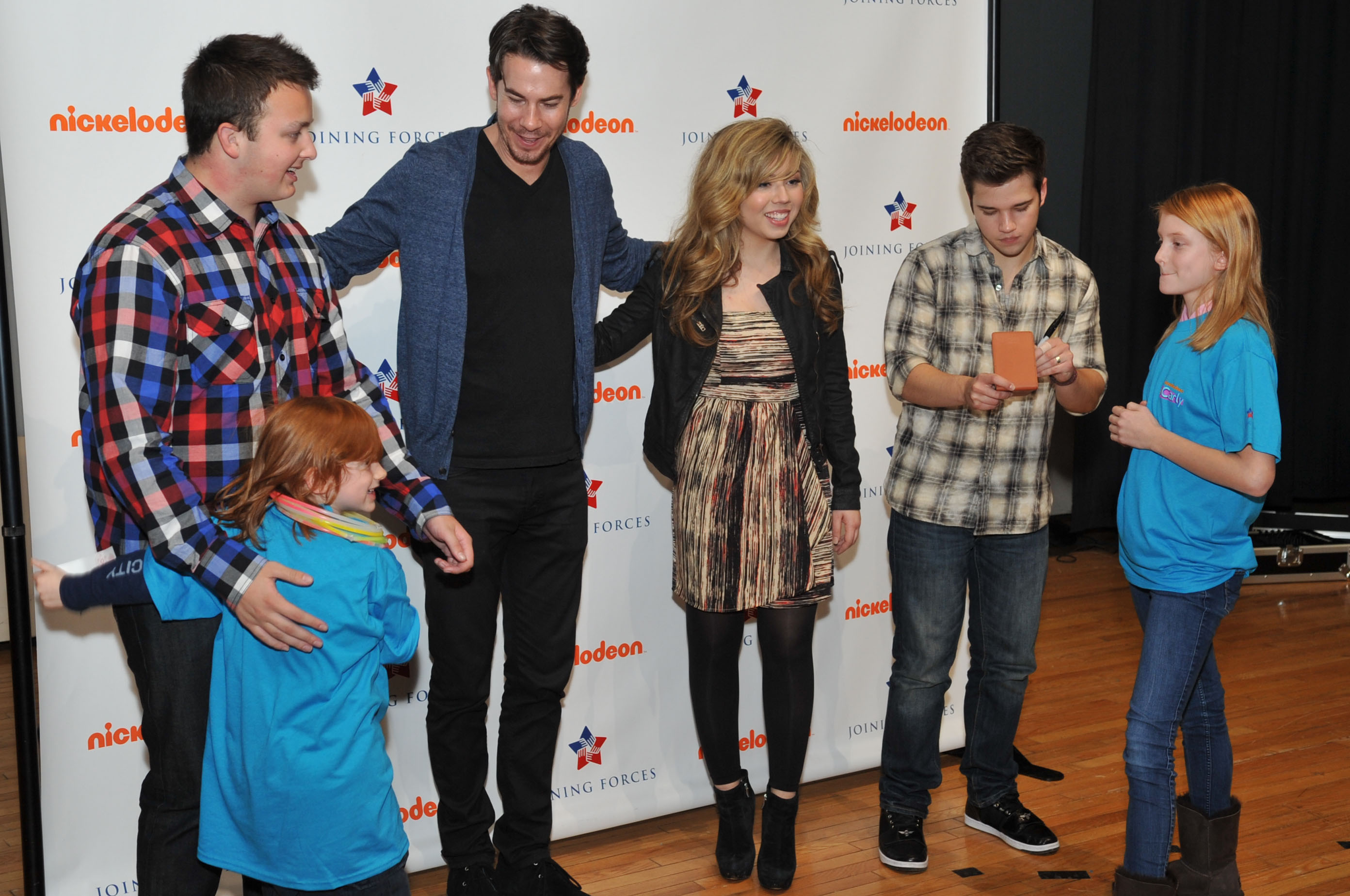
Munck with Jennette McCurdy, Nathan Kress, and Jerry Trainor

=== Music ===
Munck also produced electronic dance music under the name NoxiK. He released his first song, "Beginnings", on January 20, 2012. Since then, he began to release songs he created to his YouTube account. He released a small EP called Hotline on April 23, 2013. On December 21, 2013, NoxiK released a single entitled "Killjoy" on SoundCloud and YouTube. It was re-posted on SoundCloud by EDM.com and has become one of his most successful singles to date. He released his first official EP titled Road Warrior on March 24, 2014. As of October 2017, the project has been inactive.

Beginning on October 23, 2023, Munck began releasing experimental hip hop music as Noah Praise God. This project differs from prior endeavours as there is a heavier emphasis on vocals. The first single under this alias, "Real Sharp", released alongside a music video on the Sadworld channel. Since then, he has released three more singles on streaming platforms.

=== YouTube ===
On October 9, 2016, Munck started Sadworld, a YouTube channel dedicated to "weird, absurd" and experimental comedy sketches. The videos have a distinct editing style, described as "an amalgamation of images, glitches and sounds designed to overload viewers' senses." The channel has amassed over 11,000,000 views as of February 2024. Many of the channels' videos also contain music produced by Munck, which he releases on SoundCloud and other streaming platforms as Sadworldbeats. Munck also uploads longform videos of a similar ilk alongside collaborators Eric Bernhagen and Julian Clark on YouTube channel God's Abomination.

== Activism ==
Munck is an active supporter of Camp Del Corazon, a summer camp on Catalina Island, California, for children with heart disease.

== Filmography ==
Film
Year	Film	Role	Notes
2008	Four Christmases	Screaming Kid	
2008	The Rainbow Tribe	Ryan	
2009	All About Steve	Large Kid	
2011	Bad Teacher	Tristan	
2014	Just Before I Go	Young Rowley Stansfield	
2014	Tom Sawyer & Huckleberry Finn	Ben Rogers	
2017	Vikes	T-Bone	
2018	Shrek Retold	Shrek	Voice role
2019	Time for Dessert	Tip Crystal	Short film; also writer
2023	Future Boys	Man in Cabin	Short film

Television
Year	Film	Role	Notes
2007	All of Us	Player #1	Episode: "Let's Go, Bobby, Let's Go!"
2007–2012	iCarly	Gibby Gibson	Recurring role (season 1–3); main role (season 4–6)
2007	American Body Shop	Little Johnny	Episode: "Juicy Lou's"
2007	1321 Clover	Kid	Television film
2008	Wizards of Waverly Place	Timmy O'Hallahan	Episode: "Saving Wiz Tech Part 1"
2008	Sunday! Sunday! Sunday!	Clete	Television film
2009	ER	Logan	Episode: "I Feel Good"
2009	Phineas and Ferb	Xavier	Voice role; episode: "Phineas and Ferb's Quantum Boogaloo"
2009	The Karenskys	Kevin Karensky-Kanitsky	Television film
2010	Rules of Engagement	Mackenzie	Episode: "The Score"
2011	iParty with Victorius	Gibby Gibson	Television film
2012	Victorious	Gibby Gibson	Episode: "Tori Goes Platinum" (via archive footage from the iCarly episode iCan't Take It; uncredited)
2012	The Troop	The Sniffer	Episode: "A Sniff Too Far"
2013	Nicky Deuce	Nicky Deuce	Television film
2013	Swindle	Darren Vader	Television film
2013	Gibby!	Gibby Gibson	Unaired Pilot Episode
2014	Sam & Cat	Gibby Gibson	Episode: "#SuperPsycho"
2014–2023	The Goldbergs	"Naked" Rob Smith	Recurring role (season 2–10)
2016	Son of Zorn	Warren	Episode: "The War of the Workplace"
2017	El Bosque Sin Salida	Marcus	Episode: "Atrapados"
2019	Schooled	"Naked" Rob Smith	Episode: "Dr. Barry"

== Discography ==
NoxiK
Album/Single	Release date
Beginnings	January 20, 2012
Hotline EP	April 23, 2013
System Failure EP	Unreleased
Road Warrior	March 24, 2014

Sadworldbeats
Album/Single	Release date
sadworld beat tape #1	July 1, 2017
sadworld beat tape #2	January 1, 2018
sadworld beat tape #3	August 10, 2018
dreams	February 13, 2019
sadworld beat tape #4	July 31, 2020
stranded	September 26, 2020
trickster	November 15, 2020
heist	March 10, 2021
puzzle	April 13, 2021
lose form	March 2, 2022
sauna	May 23, 2022
mistake	December 12, 2022
My Skinwalker Story (Score)	July 19, 2023

Noah Praise God
Album/Single	Release date
Real Sharp	October 23, 2023
Thank God	November 9, 2023
Seven Faces	November 21, 2023
I'll Just Take a Walk	January 23, 2024
Then We Were Off EP	April 29, 2024
Gone From Their Sight	November 5, 2026

== Awards and nominations ==
Year	Award	Category	Show	Result	Refs
2009	Young Artist Awards	Outstanding Young Performers in a TV Series	iCarly (shared with ensemble)	Nominated	
2010	Young Artist Awards	Outstanding Young Performers in a TV Series	iCarly (shared with ensemble)	Nominated	
2010	Australian Kids' Choice Awards	LOL Award	iCarly (shared with ensemble)	Won	
2011	Kids' Choice Awards	Favorite TV Sidekick	iCarly	Nominated	
