= Jake Farrow =

American television writer and actor

- Born: James A. Farrow; October 18, 1972 (age 53); Marin County, California, U.S.
- Occupations: Screenwriter; actor
- Years active: 2000–present
- Spouse: Jennifer Sunderland (m. 2008)
- Children: 2

James A. "Jake" Farrow (born October 18, 1972) is an American television writer and retired actor. He wrote for Fox's Arrested Development and two shows on The WB: Off Centre and What I Like About You. He later worked as a writer and producer on several Nickelodeon shows, including Drake & Josh, iCarly, Victorious, Sam & Cat, Henry Danger, Game Shakers, The Adventures of Kid Danger, and Danger Force. As an actor, Farrow is known for the role of Gavin Mitchell on Drake & Josh and for voicing Rex Powers, Robbie Shapiro's ventriloquist dummy character on Victorious.

== Early life ==
Farrow was born in Marin County, California to Janet (née Strell), a high school history teacher and Michael R. Farrow (1947–2020), an air force pilot. He had an older sister, Melissa "Missy" Klute (née Farrow; 1970–2015).

== Career ==
=== Acting ===
From 2004 to 2007, Farrow played the recurring character of Gavin, a strange employee at "The Premiere", in the Nickelodeon series Drake & Josh. Gavin usually played a small part in the episodes of the show, being given relatively humorous lines and embarrassing Drake and Josh. He also appeared in Merry Christmas, Drake & Josh. Farrow reprised the role of Gavin for the iCarly episode "iStart a Fan War".

=== Writing ===
Since 2004, Farrow has worked closely with Drake & Josh creator Dan Schneider, and served as a writer for an episode of Drake & Josh. Prior to this, Farrow also wrote the story for an episode of the sitcom What I Like About You (which Schneider co-created with former Friends writer Wil Calhoun) entitled "The Party" from the show's first season.

After Drake & Josh, Farrow worked as a writer and producer on two other Nickelodeon series created by Schneider, iCarly, and Victorious. On Victorious he also voiced the puppet character Rex Powers. Farrow then worked as a writer and producer for the Nickelodeon series Henry Danger, where he has also appeared in three episodes as the voice of Invisible Brad. Farrow has produced and co-written several episodes of the Nickelodeon series Game Shakers. Farrow is also an executive producer and a writer on the Nickelodeon series Danger Force.

Farrow was a credited writer for the Emmy Award-winning television series Arrested Development.

== Filmography ==
=== As an actor ===
Year	Title	Role	Notes
2004–2007	Drake & Josh	Gavin	8 episodes
2008–2011	iCarly	Comedy Writer	Episode: "iCarly Saves TV"
2008–2011	iCarly	Gavin	Episode: "iStart a Fan War"
2008–2011	iCarly	Rex Powers/Christopher Cane (voice)	Crossover: "iParty with Victorious" and "iBloop2: Electric Bloopaloo"
2010–2013	Victorious	Rex Powers/Christopher Cane (voice)	48 episodes, uncredited role
2015	Game Shakers	Rex Powers/Christopher Cane (voice)	Cameo; episode: "Tiny Pickles"
2015–2019	Henry Danger	Brad Belcher (voice)	Episodes: "Invisible Brad", "Grave Danger", "Visible Brad"

=== As a writer ===
- Jesse (2000)
- Off Centre (2002)
- What I Like About You (2003)
- Drake & Josh (2005)
- Arrested Development (2005)
- iCarly (2007–2012) (also as a producer)
- Victorious (2010–2012) (also as a producer)
- Sam & Cat (2013–2014) (also as a co-executive producer)
- Henry Danger (2014–2015, 2018–2020) (also as a co-executive producer and executive producer)
- The Adventures of Kid Danger (2018)
- Game Shakers (2015–2019) (also as an executive producer)
- Danger Force (2020–2024) (also as an executive producer)
- Henry Danger: The Movie (2025) (also as an executive producer)
- Hollywood Arts (2026) (also the showrunner and executive producer)

== Personal life ==
In 2008, he married his wife Jennifer Sunderland. They live in Los Angeles, California with their two sons.

On August 9, 2015, Farrow's older sister Melissa died of Glioblastoma.
