= David St. James =

American actor and comedian (born 1947)

- Born: David Francis Jones; September 4, 1947 (age 79); Honolulu, Hawaii Territory
- Education: University of Georgia, Officer Candidate School
- Occupations: Actor; comedian
- Years active: 1992–present

David Francis St. James (born September 4, 1947) is an American character actor and comedian.

== Career ==
In 1992, St. James began his acting career with an appearance in the film Man Trouble. St. James is best known for his recurring roles on multiple television series, including iCarly, General Hospital, Beverly Hills, 90210, The Neighbors, Big Love, Monk, Preacher, The West Wing, and Frasier. St. James appears on The West Wing as Congressman Darren Gibson and on iCarly as Mr. Howard, a mean teacher who hates his students and wife. He also appeared in Creative Differences as Dick. He has appeared in nearly 100 movies and has had many roles on television and in commercials. St. James is also known for his role as Admiral Broden in Space: Above and Beyond and Bob Garland in Donnie Darko.

== Filmography ==
=== Film ===
Year	Title	Role	Notes
1993	Man Trouble	Admissions Clerk	
1993	Monolith	Attendant	
1994	Direct Hit	Technician	Direct-to-video
1994	Police Academy: Mission to Moscow	News Director	
1995	Forget Paris	Airline Official	
1995	Drifting School	Josh Hoffman	
1996	Black Sheep	Motorcycle Cop	
1996	Where Truth Lies	Van Ness	
1997	Alien Resurrection	Dr. Dan Sprague (Surgeon)	
1999	My Favourite Martian	Prescott	
1999	Desert Thunder	Gen. Norris	
2000	Bounce	Judge	
2000	Bobby's Whore	Father Cribbish	
2001	Donnie Darko	Bob Garland	
2001	Tomcats	Priest	
2002	Angels Don't Sleep Here	Charlie	
2003	American Wedding	Front Desk Manager	Deleted scene
2003	S.W.A.T.	Polish Hostage	
2004	Conversations	Kurt	Short film
2004	The Speeding Ticket	The Officer	Short film
2005	Marilyn Hotchkiss' Ballroom Dancing & Charm School	Cameron McGee	
2005	Black Dawn	Julius Macabe	Also known as Foreigner 2: Black Dawn; Direct-to-video
2007	Evan Almighty	Committee Member	
2008	Boob Jobs & Jesus	Jack	Voice; Short film
2009	The Revenant	Mourner	
2009	Diamond Confidential	Chief Kennard	Short film
2010	Creative Differences	Dick	
2011	Transformers: Dark of the Moon	Old NASA Scientist	
2011	Harley's Hill	Potter	Short film
2013	The Smile Man	Doctor	Short film
2017	#RealityHigh	Alfred	
TBA	Reason	Officer Dan	Short film
TBA	Agents of Project Blue Book	Ex-President Dwight Einsenhower	Post-production

=== Television ===
Year	Title	Role	Notes
1992	Days of Our Lives	Dr. Tony Love	3 episodes
1993	Lois & Clark: The New Adventures of Superman	Polygraph Technician	Episode: "Strange Visitor (From Another Planet)"
1993	Dr. Quinn, Medicine Woman	Harrison	2 episodes
1994	NYPD Blue	Line Up #6	Episode: "A Sudden Fish"
1994	Step by Step	Dr. Weltman	Episode: "Feeling Forty"
1994	ER	Kaplan	Episode: "Blizzard"
1995	On Our Own	Contractor #2	Episode: "The Boarder"
1995	Family Matters	Joey	Episode: "My Bodyguard"
1995	White Dwarf	King Joist's Royal Guard	Television film
1995	California Dreams	Mr. Lippin	Episode: "Two Too Much"
1995	ABC Afterschool Special	Coach Slocum	Episode: "Fast Forward"
1995	Too Something		Episode: "The Car"
1995	Murphy Brown	Informant	Episode: "Bad Company"
1995	Beverly Hills, 90210	Hitman #1	Episode: "One Wedding and a Funeral"
1995	Seinfeld	Doctor	Episode: "The Secret Code"
1995	The Invaders	Wood's Lawyer	Episode: "Part II"
1995–2004	The Drew Carey Show	Owen / Carpool Guy #1	2 episodes
1996	Melrose Place	Jack	Episode: "Triumph of the Bill"
1996	Space: Above and Beyond	Adm. Broden	4 episodes
1996	Crime of the Century	Albert Osborn Jr.	Television film
1996	Coach	Maître d'	Episode: "Isn't It Romantic?"
1997	NewsRadio	Lawyer	Episode: "Complaint Box"
1997	Murder One	Lawyer	Episode: "Chapter Seventeen, Year Two"
1997	Living Single	Maitre d'	Episode: "High Anxiety"
1997	Chicago Hope	Dr. Arnold Throop	Episode: "Brain Salad Surgery"
1997	Alien Avengers II	Warden	Television film
1997	Mike Hammer, Private Eye	Banning, Ropa's Lawyer	Episode: "A Penny Saved"
1997	Murder One: Diary of a Serial Killer		Miniseries
1998	Beyond Belief: Fact or Fiction	Harvey Block	Episode: "Merry-Go-Round, Red Eyed Creature, Used Car Salesman, Surveillance Camera & Graffiti (A Touch of Evil special)", segment: "Graffiti"
1998	Winchell	Miami Reporter #4	Television film
1998	For Your Love	Dr. Burgess	Episode: "The Runaround"
1998	DiResta	King of England	Episode: "The Kid"
2000	Will & Grace	Smitty	Episode: "Tea and a Total Lack of Sympathy"
2000	Getting Away with Murder: The JonBenet Ramsey Story		Television film
2000	City of Angels	Barton	Episode: "When Worlds Colitis"
2000	The Hughleys	Mr. Leeks	Episode: "Body Double"
2000	All That		Episode: "Kenan Thompson/LFO"
2000	Resurrection Blvd.	Blevins	Episode: "Dos Padres"
2000	Rude Awakening	Doctor	Episode: "Telltale Heart"
2000	The Michael Richards Show	Judge	Episode: "It's Only Personal"
2001	Just Shoot Me!	Doctor Ajay	Episode: "The Proposal: Part 2"
2001	Providence	Waiter #1	Episode: "Falling"
2001	Dead Last	Bureaucrat #1	Episode: "The Mulravian Candidate"
2001	The Amanda Show	Principal Flange	Episode 33
2001	Off Centre	Hooded Guy	Episode: "Swing Time"
2001	Alias	Mr. Franco	Episode: "Mea Culpa"
2001–2005	The West Wing	Congressman Darren Gibson, R-MI / Rep. Darren Gibson, R-MI	3 episodes
2002	My Sister's Keeper	George Chapman	Television film
2003	Frasier	Admissions Officer	Episode: "Fathers and Sons"
2004	The Stones		"Romancing the Stones"
2004	The Bernie Mac Show	Headmaster	Episode: "It's Mac-ademic"
2004	General Hospital	Stuart Mest	2 episodes
2005	Cuts	The Butler	Episode: "Reverse The Curse"
2006	Scrubs	Mr. Sommers	Episode: "My Extra Mile"
2006–2008	Everybody Hates Chris	Mr. Phillips / Thomas	2 episodes
2007	Monk	Edward Stilson	Episode: "Mr. Monk Is at Your Service"
2008	Las Vegas	Chapel Owner	Episode: "Guess Who's Coming to Breakfast"
2008–2012	iCarly	Mr. Howard	6 episodes
2009	Lincoln Heights	Tom Crawford	Episode: "Lucky"
2011	Big Love	Rod	Episode: "Til Death Do Us Part"
2011	iParty with Victorious	Mr. Howard	Television film
2012	The Neighbors	The Minister	Episode: "Juan of the Dead"
2012–2015	Community	Professor Albrecht	2 episodes
2013	1600 Penn	Klaus	Episode: "Meet the Parent"
2015	Shameless	Pastor	Episode: "I'm the Liver"
2015	A S K	Malic	Episode: "What Could Be the Harm"
2017	Powerless	Prince Evillo	Episode: "Wayne Dream Team"
2017	Trial & Error: Mystery Now	William Martin	
2017	Preacher	Archbishop of Canterbury	Episode: "Dirty Little Secret"
2018	American Housewife	Maitre d'	Episode: "The Anniversary"
2018	Here and Now	Professor Rubin	Episode: "From Sun Up to Sun Down"
2018	This Is Us	Doctor	Episode: "Vietnam"
2019	Schooled	Mr. Scudamore	Episode: "Rock for Jocks"
2019	Good Trouble	Jack Taylor	Episode: "A Very Coterie Christmas"
2020	Perry Mason	Dr. Bundy / Doctor Bundy	3 episodes
2024	Grotesquerie	Bishop	3 episodes
