= List of Big Nate characters =

The following is a list of characters from Big Nate, an American comic strip and book series written and illustrated by Lincoln Peirce.

== Nate Wright ==
Nate Wright, the comic strip's titular protagonist, is an 11-year-old (later 11½) sixth grader at P.S. 38. Nate lives with his father Martin and sister Ellen, as it was established early on in the series that his parents were divorced and his father has full custody of both him and Ellen. He is somewhat vain, believing himself to be a brilliant sports player despite his lack of athletic abilities, although he frequently saves shots as a goalkeeper with his head. He says that he is a genius despite his below-average grades, and irresistible to girls despite often being rejected by his crush Jenny Jenkins. Nate's unrequited romantic interest in Jenny has been a long-running gag in the series, however Nate showed in a 2016 comic run that he had lost interest in Jenny and had matured past his crush. In the final novel of the series (which is set in a different continuity than the comics), Nate also confirmed that he had largely gotten over his crush on Jenny, realizing she had never liked him romantically.

In addition to his bloated self-confidence with girls, Nate is shown to believe himself to be an elite athlete and genius despite being a mediocre student (as well as being rather clueless socially) and an inconsistent athlete (however, he is shown to be an adept trash talker and basketball player and has had a few standout moments as an association football/soccer goalie, including the time he made a game-winning save against Jefferson Middle School in a 2008 arc). Nate also has a knack for frequently earning detention, getting sent to detention so frequently to the point where the detention monitor Mrs. Czerwicki once likened him to her son, due to her son being incarcerated. Nate also often unsuccessfully attempts to get a dog, which often winds up backfiring on him. He also has ailurophobia, the fear of cats, hates figure skating, and is disgusted by egg salad, but loves Cheez Doodles (named "Cheesy Snacks" in the TV series, likely due to copyright issues from the actual Cheez Doodle brand).

Despite his many shortcomings, Nate is shown to have a number of talents, being a skilled artist, with it being noted that he is an especially good cartoonist. His most notable comic strip is Dr. Cesspool, which involves a doctor who uses very violent, dangerous, and disgusting methods of medicine and the consequential events that follow. Nate's other comic strip characters include Chip Chipson, Biff Biffwell, Ken Doolittle, Dan Cupid, Ultra-Nate (superhero parody of himself), Superdad (superhero parody of his father Martin), The Snuggles Family, Maureen Biology, Moe Mentum, Dr. Warren Fuzzy, and Luke Warm, Private Eye. Nate is also shown to be a talented chess player, formerly being the best chess player at his school before the arrival of his frenemy Artur, who also happens to be a better artist than him. Nate is shown to be an inconsistently talented musician, with him being bad at playing the trombone, but is a talented drummer and decent singer, performing as the drummer of the band Enslave the Mollusk with Artur and his best friends Francis and Teddy. Nate is also known for having a superhuman sense of smell, has an ability to detect "vibes" from people, and is known for his talent of nicknaming people, being called "The Nickname Czar".

While not typically regarded as one of the most popular students at his school and being viewed as somewhat annoying by his peers, Nate is generally shown to be somewhat well-liked by his fellow students. Exceptions to this include Gina Hemphill-Toms (Nate's rival), Randy Betancourt (though in Big Nate: Blasts Off, Nate and Randy eventually become friends), Chester Budrick (who does not like many people to begin with but notably finds Nate to be annoying), Marcus Goode (who is a seventh grade bully), and Nick Blonsky. Nate's core friend group consists of his best friends Francis Pope and Teddy Ortiz, along with Chad Applewhite and Dee Dee Holloway. Nate is also good friends with Artur Pashkov, though he maintains a one-sided rivalry with him due to Artur currently being in a relationship with Jenny, Nate's long-running crush, and Artur replacing Nate as the school's best artist and chess player. In recent years, however, Nate's jealousy towards Artur has lessened due to him mostly losing his crush on Jenny and overall becoming more mature as a person. Even when Nate still had a significant crush on Jenny, he still defended Artur from Marcus Goode and his group of bullies, despite the major physical and social danger it posed to him. Nate is also shown to be friends with Jenny's best friend and Francis' former girlfriend Sheila Stapleton.

While Nate is known to be selfish and self-absorbed, he is ultimately shown to be kind and cares for his friends when it truly counts, such as helping Chad ask out a girl he liked, often pushing Francis to do well in his studies due to Francis' interest in academia, supporting Dee Dee's acting, and giving Teddy a high rating on his "Q-Score" scale, a ranking system that Nate invented which measures coolness.

In the TV series, he is voiced by Ben Giroux.

== Nate's family ==
=== Marty Wright ===
Martin Earl "Marty" Wright is Nate's father, a bald-headed, overweight divorcé who lost his job in the eighth novel of the series (eventually getting another one). Like his son, he is somewhat clueless about his failings and considers himself a professional musician despite his indescribably horrible singing voice and initially poor steel-string guitar playing, an athlete despite his inherent laziness, and an expert golfer, though he constantly cheats or loses his ball. He is a health nut and always tries to hand out healthy alternatives to candy on Halloween (raisins, prunes, soy nuts, etc.), which are always rejected by trick-or-treaters, but he never seems to be able to connect the dots and realize that kids don't want healthy food for Halloween. He also was the hero of the first Mud Bowl, according to Big Nate: Blasts Off. His first name was stated on July 28, 2005.

In the TV series, he is voiced by Rob Delaney.

=== Ellen Wright ===
Ellen Wright is Nate's fifteen-year-old sister who is older by four years. Unlike Nate, Ellen is responsible and hardworking (though her original characterization in the earlier years of the comic strip was that of a rebellious and ditzy teenage girl) and loves cats and figure skating. Nate is always compared to Ellen in school by teachers. She is Nate's consistent rival, and he enjoys playing pranks on her. Ellen also dates Gordie, who works at the comic book store and is considered her crush, on and off, and has previously dated Kenny Smithson, the captain of the football team. They briefly broke up before reconciling.

In the TV series, she is voiced by Dove Cameron.

=== Marge Wright ===
Marjorie "Marge" Wright is Nate's paternal grandmother. She and her husband, Vern, have a slightly tense relationship, as she sometimes nags him about giving up her career for married life and for generally being lazy.

In the TV series, she is voiced by Laraine Newman.

=== Vern Wright ===
Vernon "Vern" Wright is Nate's paternal grandfather. He enjoys stating his opinion without consideration and using his age to show off. He is shown to have a tattoo, and he also likes Junior Mints.

In the TV series, he is voiced by Charlie Schlatter.

=== Ted Wright ===
Nate and Ellen's paternal uncle and Marty's younger brother. Ted is a middle-aged, lazy, obese, and unemployed man-child who lives in Nate's grandparents' basement. He dropped out of college and since then has never held down a job. When he was in 5th grade, he played the oboe. He is oblivious to his family's hints that he move out (once believing his parents telling him to move out was a sign of tension in their marriage) and find work, and spouts sci-fi and musical trivia at the drop of a hat. He is a big fan of World of Warcraft, My Little Pony, Star Trek, and Battlestar Galactica.

In the TV series, he makes his first and only appearance in the episode "Fuller House", and is voiced by Paul Scheer.

== Nate's friend group ==
=== Francis Pope ===
Francis Butthurst Pope is Nate's best friend, or as Nate puts it, "his #1 friend". He is also Teddy's best friend and is close with the rest of Nate's friend group. Francis is often noted to be a great student, often second only behind Gina. Francis loves trivia and knowledge (to an addicted degree) and often reads from a book known as "The Book of Facts" or "Funtastic Facts", often to the annoyance of Nate and Teddy. Despite his somewhat geeky personality, Francis is shown to be a decent athlete and a good guitarist, playing in Nate's band Enslave the Mollusk. Nate and Francis often argue about cats vs dogs as Francis is a cat person and even has a cat named Pickles. In the early strips, Francis had a crush on Nate's sister Ellen, but quickly got over it and is dating Sheila Stapleton. However, Sheila has not often appeared in recent years and their relationship is no longer frequently referenced or shown. A lengthy on-off arc shows him and Gina having feelings for each other and starting a romantic relationship, with Gina getting over her crush on Chad. This contradicts both their earlier rivalry and Francis' relationship with Sheila that has been confirmed to be dropped from the strip. In Big Nate: Flips Out, it is revealed that he told Nate his embarrassing middle name (Butthurst) as a part of making their friendship official (in return, Nate told him he was afraid of cats, although this is less secret).

In the TV series, he is voiced by Daniel MK Cohen.

=== Teddy Ortiz ===
Teddy √ Ortiz is Nate's number "1A" best friend. Teddy is a comedic character who frequently cracks jokes and annoys Nate. Like Francis, Teddy likes Artur and is a member of Enslave the Mollusk, their band. His middle name is the square root symbol since his parents are math teachers. In the comic strip, he has an older sister, but in the TV series, he has a mischievous little brother. In Big Nate: Flips Out, it is revealed that he is fluent in Spanish. He plays the musical keyboard in Enslave the Mollusk. In his debut year, 1994, it is revealed that Teddy is half Mexican and half Puerto Rican, and that over the summer Teddy gets to live in Mexico with his grandparents, however, this stopped happening in 1996. Teddy also knows a lot about the Civil War, as his dad is an expert of the Civil War, and has been teaching him facts since he was a baby.

In the TV series, he is voiced by Arnie Pantoja.

=== Chad Applewhite ===
Chad Applewhite is one of Nate's good friends. He is a small chubby kid with red hair and freckles. He is obsessed with eating and food. Chad is the roadie for Enslave the Mollusk. Running gags include Chad suddenly appearing when someone mentions food and the characters commenting on Chad's ability to attract girls due to his cuteness (the characters call it "the power of Chad"). He is an Aries. In Big Nate: On a Roll, he played the character of Michael in P.S. 38's production of Peter Pan.

In the TV series, he is voiced by Charlie Schlatter.

=== Dee Dee Holloway ===
Dee Dee Dorcas Holloway is a friend of Nate who is president of the drama club and is considered by Nate and his friends to be a drama queen. Her first appearance was in the second book from the novel series, Big Nate: Strikes Again, in one of his drawings, though her first major appearance was in Big Nate: Goes for Broke. As the series went on, she gradually became a part of Nate's friend group. After the novel series ended, she became a major character in the comics.

In the TV series, she is voiced by Bryce Charles and is in a relationship with a girl named Amy.

=== Amy ===
Amy is a character specifically created for the TV series. She is one of Nate's friends in his friend group and Dee Dee’s girlfriend. She is from New York and uses an electric wheelchair. Her first appearance was in the episode "Sixtween Candles". She is voiced by Ali Stroker who uses a wheelchair as well.

== P.S. 38 students ==
=== Artur Pashkov ===
Artur Pashkov (Belarusian: Артур Пашкоў, romanized: Artur Paškoŭ; Russian: Артур Пашков) is a friendly, intelligent, and well-liked exchange student from Belarus. He is the boyfriend of Jenny Jenkins. Nate can never beat him at chess as well as other activities (most notably academics, art, and singing). Out of jealousy of his success, Nate often calls him "Mr. Perfect" or "Peachy McWonderful". Artur has a lot of major luck, and Nate believes that he is "perfect in every way". In Big Nate: On a Roll, Mr. Rosa tells Nate to hold up the ladder for Artur while he paints the scenery for the school play, only for Nate to get detention after knocking over the ladder when the paint got in his eyes.

While Nate is generally envious of Artur, namely due to him being better than him at things such as drawing and chess, as well as being in a relationship with Jenny, whom Nate had a crush on for years, Artur is typically oblivious of Nate's envy, and even once stated that he considers Nate his best friend. Despite his envy of Artur, Nate does consider him a friend, stating as such as when he defends Artur from a bully from P.S. 38 named Marcus, and he will begrudgingly admit on occasion that even he likes Artur.

In the TV series, Artur is voiced by Todd Haberkorn, and he is instead from a fictional nation known as Stylgravia, rather than Belarus.

=== Randy Betancourt ===
Randy Betancourt (also called "Randy Buttancourt" in some of Nate's comics) is one of Nate's rivals and a school bully, although in Big Nate: Blasts Off he becomes friends with Nate and reveals himself to be insecure; as his parents are divorced, he is forced to see a counselor.

In the TV series, he is voiced by Nik Dodani.

=== Jenny Jenkins ===
Jenny Jenkins is one of Nate's classmates and his former biggest crush, as well as Artur's girlfriend. Jenny was Nate's main love interest throughout the strip until April 2016, when after a breakup with Trudy, a seventh-grader, Nate no longer showed romantic interest in Jenny. In the book series, Nate ended his crush on Jenny for his new crush Ruby in Big Nate: Blasts Off.

Jenny, aware of Nate's interest in her, tries to avoid his presence at all costs and responds to him harshly. This fails, as all it does is encourage Nate to think of her as his "soul mate". Nate often tries to prove to her that Jenny secretly has feelings for him, and that one day they will be "madly in love". In the comic series, Jenny notably went out with several different boys, much to Nate's annoyance and/or sadness. Jenny's current boyfriend is Artur, and they are still together in a tight romantic relationship.

In the TV series, she is voiced by Chandni Parekh.

=== Breckenridge Puffington III ===
As a character that was only introduced in the book series, Nate's most recently met student, Breckenridge Puffington III (also called B-Dawg by Nate's friend group), is a somewhat shy and wimpy student that did not make a good impression on Nate. Breckenridge is enthusiastic about plants and gardening, having a strong passion to be a botanist when he grows up.

He debuts in the 7th book of the series, Big Nate: Lives It Up. Nate was asked to be his "buddy", giving him a tour throughout the school and showing him throughout the building. In the middle of the novel, he was revealed to be Nate's bully in kindergarten, although he does not remember bullying Nate. This sets Nate off and he snaps at Breckenridge, but later he comes to forgive him. He makes a cameo in Big Nate: Blasts Off reading the school newspaper and laughing.

=== Gina Hemphill-Toms ===
Gina Hemphill-Toms is one of Nate's smartest schoolmates and his arch-rival. She has a large ego and often kisses up to several teachers, most notably Mrs. Godfrey, much to Nate's annoyance and disgust. Throughout her school, she is generally disliked for her knack of bragging and showing off her high academic skills. For the longest time, she had an unrequited crush on Chad but later starts dating Francis.

In the TV series, she is voiced by Lisa Kay Jennings.

=== Kim Cressly ===
Kim Cressly is a big girl who at one point decided Nate was her boyfriend and refused to take "no" for an answer. She later becomes Chester Budrick's girlfriend and uses Nate to make him feel jealous, claiming his rage is "adorable." Most recently she has become a couple with Chad.

In the TV series, she is voiced by Betsy Sodaro.

=== Chester Budrick ===
Chester Budrick is a large tough kid in Nate's class who's an offscreen character, though his arms, torso, and legs are sometimes shown. His face is never shown. The reader usually sees only the results of Chester's actions. He is very strong and often throws people when he is mad at them, and accidentally knocks people over when he tries to high-five, fist bump, or belly bump them. He is said to be 6' 6". Nate says he once beat up his anger management therapist in Big Nate: In a Class by Himself.

=== Marcus Goode ===
Marcus Goode is a "popular kid" at P.S. 38, although he tends to bully others. He is in seventh grade and his friends always follow him around. Nate calls those friends Marcettes. Recurring jokes involve Nate, Teddy, and Francis attempting to come up with comebacks to the names Marcus calls them.

In a 2011 comic strip arc, Nate chose to join Marcus's gang but later left in favor of hanging out with his friends. He competed in the school's field day competition with the seventh graders in Big Nate: In the Zone against the sixth graders. He loses the three-legged competition against Chad Applewhite and Maya, and afterwards, Marcus is humiliated in front of the whole school by Chad during a performance by Enslave the Mollusk.

=== Sheila Stapleton ===
Sheila Stapleton is a friend of Nate, Francis, Teddy, and Jenny. She went out with Francis in the older comics. She is the captain of the cheerleaders and is Jenny's best friend.

=== Daphne ===
Daphne is Nate's fifth and current girlfriend. Like Nate, she likes Cheez Doodles and dislikes figure skating and egg salad, as well as being allergic to cats. She was Gina's lab partner, but Gina and Nate switched partners so the former could work with Chad and win his affection. Instead, Nate and Daphne ended up falling in love and have started dating since May 2023, longer than Nate has dated any of his past girlfriends.

== P.S. 38 staff ==
=== Clara Godfrey ===
Clara Godfrey (nee Lessard), is P.S. 38's social studies teacher. Nate spends much of his time trying to avoid her outside of class and antagonizing her in class, making up several nicknames for her, like Venus de Silo, Godzilla, Dark Side of the Moon, She Who Must Not Be Named, Dragon Breath, Chalkzilla, etc.

Nate has been known to exaggerate her physical features in his comics. Nate has called her a 'Creature Teacher' and hates her the most due to her rude attitude towards his getting detention, and the fact that she is a cat person. Additionally, he frequently draws her as a parody of The Devil and had stated in a comic that her father is Beelzebub. Nate also thinks that 6th grade would have been much easier for him if his older sister Ellen had not been there first, as Mrs. Godfrey thought Ellen was a joy to teach, and Ellen had good grades. The relationship between Mrs. Godfrey and Nate is not entirely negative, though. She allowed Nate to create a report about Benjamin Franklin in cartoon form (as Franklin was a cartoonist himself), giving him an outlet for his creativity and energy. She once saved Nate from choking on a peppermint, using the Heimlich Maneuver. She has also done such to Mr. Rosa.

She has two daughters named Katrina and Meghan, respectively, and her husband has only been mentioned in a few comics. She shares Nate's love for Star Trek: The Next Generation, maple donuts, and Cheez Doodles, something that is especially horrifying to him. She is also a fan of Gina and gives the class hard homework simply because Gina wants it.

In the TV series, she is voiced by Carolyn Hennesy.

=== Ken Rosa ===
Ken Rosa is Nate's art teacher. He is a soft-spoken and mild-mannered man, but overworked and embittered about his career, occasionally stating in regret that he has a master's degree. He also works at an ice cream parlor called "Sweet Licks" during the summer. It is also revealed that Mr. Rosa has an addiction to waffles, and sometimes gets into a "waffle coma" when he eats too many of them.

In the TV series, he is voiced by Ryan W. Garcia.

=== Wesley Nichols ===
Wesley Nichols is the principal of P.S. 38. Nate and the other students are friendly toward him, but do not treat him as an authority figure; he is bewildered by the students.

In the TV series, he is voiced by Kevin Michael Richardson.

=== Geraldine Shipulski ===
Geraldine Shipulski is Principal Nichols' secretary. Often referred to as "the blushing rose of the principal's office" by Nate, she has a Twitter following that rivals most pop stars. She also (normally) has lots of jellybeans in her desk, which students often ask her for.

In the TV series, she is voiced by Carolyn Hennesy.

=== Mrs. Czerwicki ===
Mrs. Czerwicki is a school volunteer who supervises the students in detention. She reads romance novels while sitting in detention, and Nate occasionally goads her into complaining about her personal relationships. Mrs. Czerwicki sometimes plays table football with Nate. Nate also sometimes reads out of her romance novels while she is asleep.

=== Fontaine Galvin ===
Fontaine Galvin is Nate's aging science teacher. He has a crush on Greta Van Susteren, and has almost no visible sense of humor, resulting in him conducting a very boring class. His nose is always red for unknown reasons. His first name is revealed to be "Fontaine" in the TV series.

In the TV series, he is voiced by Michael Rivkin.

=== School Picture Guy ===
School Picture Guy is a jovial character who appears every year as the school picture photographer who manages to photograph Nate at his worst. He wears a band-aid on his head, and he often addresses Nate as "kid". He also appears in unexpected places doing odd jobs such as a birthday clown, DJ, store Santa Claus, mall cop, a school board meeting reporter, balloon blower, and an advertiser for Pirates Booty mini golf. He and Nate are shown to have a good relationship, with Nate sometimes bringing him along for various schemes. He appears to live with his mother. His real name is never revealed.

In the TV series, he is voiced by Kevin Michael Richardson.

=== Coach Calhoun ===
Coach Calhoun is Nate's main gym teacher. He is also Nate's friends' baseball, soccer, and basketball coach. He manages to keep a positive attitude despite the fact that P.S. 38's sports teams tend to lose competitions against other schools most of the time, usually by a large margin.

=== Coach John ===
Coach John is a frequent substitute for Coach Calhoun. Coach John originally was the full-time coach of the school's physical education program. He also is the school's soccer (but mainly the goalie) coach. He has a sadistic approach to physical training, and he is hated by the students.

In the TV series, he is voiced by Kevin Michael Richardson.

=== Mr. Staples ===
Mr. Staples is a math teacher at P.S. 38 who has a tendency to tell knock-knock jokes and to act goofy in general. He has an NCAA Champion ring and revealed to readers that he was a team statistician. Little is known about his personal life, but he was once rumored to have a crush on Ms. LaChance.

=== Ms. Clarke ===
Ms. Clarke is Nate's English teacher, his second favorite teacher behind Mr. Rosa. It was mentioned that Mrs. Godfrey and Ms. Clarke are good friends.

=== Mrs. Hickson ===
Mrs. "Hickey" Hickson is the school librarian. She is a middle-aged woman who does not tolerate insolence from anyone. According to Nate, she ever forgets a name, a face, or a book borrowed from her library. She is the first and only teacher to ever send Gina Hemphill-Toms to detention at the end of Big Nate: Strikes Again.

=== Donna ===
Donna is a substitute drama teacher in the Big Nate episode "The Pimple". She is the first ever LGBTQ character in the entire Big Nate franchise, revealed when she introduced her wife, Kathleen, to Dee Dee.

She is voiced by Kimberly Brooks.

== Other characters ==
=== Wink Summers ===
Chief Meteorologist Wink Summers is never seen, and only heard from during his show, but Nate, despite admiring Wink and seeing him as a hero, constantly calls him and complains whenever any part of the weather is not to his liking or if Wink's forecast is wrong. Wink Summers is actually his professional name used on air; his real name being Dick Schipp. He was replaced by Chip Cavendish and transferred to a weekend meteorologist in August 2011. In 2013, Wink Summers came back as the chief meteorologist. His wife had divorced him during his demotion and married the sports anchor.

Wink's first ever on-screen major role in the entire Big Nate franchise is in the Big Nate episode "The Future is Fuzzy", in which he is voiced by Chester Rushing.

=== Spitsy ===
Spitsy is the neighborhood dog owned by Mr. Eustis, who lives next door to Nate. Spitsy always wears a dog cone because he would gnaw at himself otherwise. Nate likes to hang out with Spitsy. He is described by Nate as "the ultimate dog nerd", is afraid of mailmen, and had to go to the vet and get his stomach pumped after swallowing a tennis ball. He has a crush on Francis' cat Pickles (who reciprocates his feelings), went to a cat tea party, and even knitted a sweater like his own for a cat. One time Nate and Teddy caught him singing a song from the musical "Cats" on a karaoke machine. He likes figure skating as much as Ellen and gets his tongue stuck on metal poles in the winter frequently. He also gets bullied by squirrels.

In the TV series, Spitsy is voiced by Mitch Watson.

=== Pickles ===
Francis' cat, Pickles is an outdoor cat and usually hangs out on the driveway. She also has a crush on Spitsy, the neighborhood dog, much to Nate's annoyance.

=== Sherman ===
Sherman is the pet gerbil in Nate's social studies class. Nate and the other students frequently confide in him or comment about his emotional state. Sherman's sarcastic responses and comments are shown to readers via inner monologue.

=== Don Eustis ===
Donald "Don" Eustis is depicted as a heavy man, a bachelor, and the next-door neighbor of the Wrights. Nate has an autumn job raking leaves for Mr. Eustis. He also has a summer job mowing his lawn, and a winter job shoveling snow. He is Spitsy's owner and Nate wishes he had a dog so he walks Spitsy and babysits him.

=== Peter ===
Peter is a 7-year-old boy who Nate sometimes babysits and serves as a 'Book Buddy.' He speaks with a lateral lisp, has an IQ of 204, and reads at a college level. Nate tutors him by introducing him to Femme Fatality comics.

=== Miranda ===
Miranda is a 6-year-old girl who was once babysat by Ellen Wright. She also enjoys ragging on Nate Wright. Nate once substituted Miranda's book buddy and on multiple occasions, he found Spitsy stealing Miranda's dolls. She occasionally works with Peter.

=== Gordie ===
Gordon "Gordie" is Ellen's boyfriend. He shares Nate's love for the comic book Femme Fatality and works at a nearby comic shop at the mall called Klassic Komix. He has a boss named Wayne, who mainly communicates by mumbling.

=== Chip Cavendish ===
Chief Meteorologist Chip Cavendish was the weatherman who replaced Wink Summers as chief meteorologist when Wink was demoted. He appeared on March 5, 2012, in a science class to talk to Nate and his classmates, where Nate accused him of ruining Wink Summers's career.

=== Wayne ===
Wayne is a large hairy man who is Gordie's boss at Klassic Komix, a comic shop at the mall. He mainly communicates by mumbling.

=== Rusty Sienna ===
A character in the earlier years of Big Nate, host of "Oil Painting with Rusty" and Nate's inspiration to be an artist. A graduate of the Art Institute of P.O. Box 73, he is a parody of Bob Ross and his public television art show. Rusty Sienna returns to the Big Nate comic on August 2, 2007, for a strip where Nate finds out that he died on May 7, 1996, aged 56. Nate, who has been seeing episodes of him, is devastated by the fact that his favorite artist had been "secretly dead" and that he is only seeing reruns.

=== Kenny Smithson ===
Kenny Smithson was Ellen Wright's former boyfriend. Kenny's first appearance was in November 1991, and Ellen dumped him in June 1995. When Nate was around the mall with Francis, Nate said "I had hawk-vision eyes, and I saw Kenny Smithson with another girl!"

=== Nolan ===
Nolan is a student from Jefferson Middle School who likes bullying Nate and his friends.

In the TV series, he is voiced by Nik Dodani.

=== Zach Belfour ===
Zach Belfour is the striker on the Jefferson soccer team. When P.S. 38 had mold in 2008, the P.S. 38 students move to Jefferson, Zach torments and teases Nate and his friends right up until their big soccer game. During the soccer game, P.S. 38 ends Jefferson's four-year winning streak when the game goes into penalty kicks. Nate made a spectacular save against Zach which caused P.S. 38 to win the big game.

=== Mr. Chung ===
Nate's social studies teacher in 2008, while the P.S. 38 students go to Jefferson while the school has mold that is being cleaned up. At the start of the year, Mr. Chung seemed to have a liking for Nate, but later in the year, Mr. Chung started to yell at Nate quite a lot, possibly because Nate posts about him a lot on his blog.

=== Angie ===
Angie was Nate's first girlfriend from July 1997 to February 1998. She was enrolled in summer school in 1997 because she was new to the school. Nate repeatedly lied to her to impress her, which ironically ended up with Nate being punched in the face. She stayed in Nate's friend circle briefly after breaking up with him before she started going out with Dan Labreque. Angie appeared in a few more arcs in 1998, but she hasn't appeared since, apart from being mentioned in a 2013 comic.

=== Kelly ===
Kelly was Nate's second girlfriend from Jefferson. They first met at the soccer camp. They broke up after Nate wrote a breakup note on a detention slip in an attempt to chase after Jenny again. They dated from July 2001 to April 2002. She is mentioned in two comics from 2013 and 2016. She made her first appearance in over two decades on August 11, 2025.

=== Trudy ===
Trudy is a seventh grader and Nate's third girlfriend. They met at the fair when Francis and Teddy didn't want to join Nate on a roller coaster. She went missing and Nate spent the summer trying to find her until he literally ran into her at P.S. 38. When Nate told her he is a sixth grader, he thought she did not want to go out with him, but then she kissed him, officially starting the relationship. However, because Nate kept going to parties and hangouts with Trudy and her friends, missing out on even more special events involving his friends, he eventually broke up with her. They dated from October 2015 to March 2016.

=== Daisy ===
Daisy was the temporary fourth girlfriend of Nate who only appeared in a long arc from February to March 2017. They broke up soon after starting to date because they felt no love while being with each other. When they kissed, they felt nothing. They stayed together only for that one date.

=== Ruby Dinsmore ===
Ruby Dinsmore was Nate’s crush and girlfriend in the eighth book, Big Nate: Blasts Off, was shown that Randy Betancourt also had feelings for her, but when Nate says he was not moving to California for his dad’s new job, she kissed him on the cheek. She also played in the Mud Bowl. Due to the novel series ending after Big Nate: Blasts Off, the status of Nate and Ruby's relationship has been left unknown.

In the TV series, she is voiced by Stephanie Sheh.
