= List of Big Nate collections =

This is a list of comic collection books in the Big Nate franchise, an American comic strip written and illustrated by Lincoln Peirce.

== Collections ==
Title	Publication date	Description	ISBN	Publisher
Add More Babes: Awesome Big Nate Comics	January 7, 1992	First ever collection, covers strips from 1991.	ISBN 0-88687-682-6	Topper Books
Big Nate: Dibs on this Chair	2001 (June 11, 2013 for new eBook edition)	Covers strips from June 13, 1997 to December 31, 1997 (excluding Sunday strips).	TBA (new eBook edition)	Andrews McMeel Publishing (new eBook edition)
Big Nate: Pray for a Fire Drill	2001 (June 11, 2013 for new eBook edition)	Covers strips from January 1, 1997 to June 7, 1997 (excluding Sunday strips).	TBA (new eBook edition)	Andrews McMeel Publishing (new eBook edition)
Big Nate: Makes a Splash	2001 (June 11, 2013 for new eBook edition)	Covers Sunday strips from 1997.	TBA (new eBook edition)	Andrews McMeel Publishing (new eBook edition)
I Smell a Pop Quiz!: A Big Nate Book	June 7, 2008 (June 11, 2013 for new eBook edition)	Covers strips from August 29, 2005 to August 26, 2006 (as well as a few others from as early as January 2005).	ISBN 0-615-19719-1 (For original version, TBA for new eBook edition)	United Media (Andrews McMeel Publishing for new eBook edition)
Big Nate: From the Top	October 19, 2010	Covers strips from August 28, 2006 to April 1, 2007.	ISBN 978-1-4494-0232-7	Andrews McMeel Publishing
Big Nate: Out Loud	April 26, 2011	Covers strips from April 2, 2007, to November 4, 2007.	ISBN 978-1-4494-0718-6	Andrews McMeel Publishing
Big Nate And Friends	December 6, 2011	Covers strips about the titular character's many friends from 1997 to 2007.	ISBN 978-1-4494-2043-7	Andrews McMeel Publishing
Big Nate: What Could Possibly Go Wrong?	May 8, 2012	Covers strips from November 5, 2007 to June 8, 2008.	ISBN 978-0-06-208694-5	HarperCollins
Big Nate: Here Goes Nothing	August 21, 2012	Covers strips from June 9, 2008 to January 9, 2009.	ISBN 978-0-06-208696-9	HarperCollins
Big Nate Makes the Grade	August 21, 2012	Covers strips that are school-related.	ISBN 978-1-4494-2566-1	Andrews McMeel Publishing
Big Nate: All Work and No Play (A Collection of Big Nate Sundays)	October 23, 2012	Covers Sunday strips from 1998 to 2000.	ISBN 978-1-4494-2567-8	Andrews McMeel Publishing
Big Nate: Game On!	April 16, 2013	Covers strips that are sports-related (basketball, baseball, and soccer).	ISBN 978-1-4494-2777-1	Andrews McMeel Publishing
Big Nate: Genius Mode	May 7, 2013	Covers strips from January 11, 2009 to August 9, 2009.	ISBN 978-0-06-208698-3	HarperCollins
Big Nate: I Can't Take It!	October 15, 2013	Covers Sunday strips from 2000 to 2004.	ISBN 978-1-4494-2937-9	Andrews McMeel Publishing
Big Nate: Great Minds Think Alike	April 1, 2014	Covers strips from 2002–2006 and only ten Sunday strips from 2008–2009.	ISBN 978-1-4494-3635-3	Andrews McMeel Publishing
Big Nate: Mr. Popularity	May 6, 2014	Covers strips from August 10, 2009 to March 7, 2010.	ISBN 978-0-06-208700-3	HarperCollins
Big Nate: The Crowd Goes Wild!	October 14, 2014	Covers strips from March 8, 2010 to October 9, 2010.	ISBN 978-1-4494-3634-6	Andrews McMeel Publishing
Big Nate's Greatest Hits	January 6, 2015	Covers every Big Nate strip published in 1997, including the strips from the three 2001 Big Nate books.	ISBN 978-1-4494-6489-9	Andrews McMeel Publishing
Big Nate: Say Good-Bye To Dork City	March 17, 2015	Covers strips from October 10, 2010 to May 14, 2011.	ISBN 978-1-4494-6225-3	Andrews McMeel Publishing
Big Nate: Welcome To My World	September 15, 2015	Covers strips from May 15, 2011 to October 30, 2011.	ISBN 978-1-4494-6226-0	Andrews McMeel Publishing
Big Nate: Thunka, Thunka, Thunka	March 1, 2016	Covers strips from October 31, 2011 to April 21, 2012.	ISBN 978-1-4494-6227-7	Andrews McMeel Publishing
Big Nate: Revenge of the Cream Puffs	September 6, 2016	Covers strips from April 22, 2012 to October 13, 2012.	ISBN 978-1-4494-6228-4	Andrews McMeel Publishing
The Epic Big Nate	October 25, 2016	A 25th anniversary special collection, covering strips from 1991 to 2015, with annotations by the cartoonist on some strips, as well as an exclusive Q&A with Diary of a Wimpy Kid author Jeff Kinney, behind-the-scenes looks at Big Nate: the Musical and its world record largest comic strip, and excerpts of Lincoln Peirce's sketchbook from childhood to his later career.	ISBN 978-1-4494-7195-8	Andrews McMeel Publishing
Big Nate: What's a Little Noogie Between Friends?	February 28, 2017	Covers strips from October 14, 2012 to April 13, 2013.	ISBN 978-1-4494-6229-1	Andrews McMeel Publishing
Big Nate: A Good Old Fashioned Wedgie	August 29, 2017	Covers strips from April 21, 2013 to October 5, 2013, and the May 25, 2014 strip used as the book's title strip.	ISBN 978-1-4494-6230-7	Andrews McMeel Publishing
Big Nate: Silent But Deadly	March 20, 2018	Covers strips from October 6, 2013, to March 29, 2014.	ISBN 978-1-4494-8991-5	Andrews McMeel Publishing
Big Nate Goes Bananas!	September 18, 2018	Covers strips from March 30, 2014 to September 13, 2014, excluding the May 25, 2014 strip used as the title strip for Big Nate: A Good Old Fashioned Wedgie.	ISBN 978-1-4494-8995-3	Andrews McMeel Publishing
Big Nate: Payback Time!	March 19, 2019	Covers strips from September 22, 2014 to March 14, 2015.	ISBN 978-1-4494-9774-3	Andrews McMeel Publishing
Big Nate: Hug It Out!	September 3, 2019	Covers strips from March 15, 2015 to September 13, 2015.	ISBN 978-1-5248-5184-2	Andrews McMeel Publishing
Big Nate: Blow the Roof Off!	March 3, 2020	Covers strips from September 14, 2015 to February 28, 2016.	ISBN 978-1-5248-5506-2	Andrews McMeel Publishing
Big Nate Stays Classy	June 2, 2020	A treasury collection containing the entirety of Big Nate: From the Top and Big Nate: Out Loud in one book.	ISBN 978-1-5248-6176-6	Andrews McMeel Publishing
Big Nate: The Gerbil Ate My Homework	September 1, 2020	Covers strips from February 29, 2016 to September 4, 2016.	ISBN 978-1-5248-6065-3	Andrews McMeel Publishing
Big Nate: In Your Face!	March 2, 2021	Covers strips from September 5, 2016 to February 25, 2017.	ISBN 978-1-5248-6477-4	Andrews McMeel Publishing
Big Nate: Top Dog	July 27, 2021	A treasury collection containing the entirety of Big Nate: And Friends and Big Nate: Makes the Grade in one book.	ISBN 978-1-5248-6979-3	Andrews McMeel Publishing
Big Nate: Aloha!	August 31, 2021	Covers strips from February 26, 2017 to September 2, 2017.	ISBN 978-1-5248-6856-7	Andrews McMeel Publishing
Big Nate: Beware of Low Flying Corn Muffins	March 8, 2022	Covers strips from September 3, 2017 to September 9, 2018. (excluding rerun hiatus from December 31, 2017 to July 15, 22, and 29, 2018, and including a repeat of August 27, 2017 strip)	ISBN 978-1-5248-7157-4	Andrews McMeel Publishing
Big Nate: Very Funny!	July 26, 2022	A treasury collection containing the entirety of Big Nate: Welcome to My World and Big Nate: Thunka, Thunka, Thunka in one book.	ISBN 978-1-5248-7695-1	Andrews McMeel Publishing
Big Nate: Release the Hounds!	September 27, 2022	Covers strips from September 10, 2018 to February 23, 2019.	ISBN 978-1-5248-7557-2	Andrews McMeel Publishing
Big Nate: Nailed It!	February 28, 2023	Covers strips from February 24, 2019 to August 11, 2019.	ISBN 978-1-5248-7923-5	Andrews McMeel Publishing
Big Nate: No Worries!	July 25, 2023	A treasury collection containing the entirety of Big Nate: Revenge of the Cream Puffs and Big Nate: What's a Little Noogie Between Friends? in one book.	ISBN 978-1-5248-8091-0	Andrews McMeel Publishing
Big Nate: Move It Or Lose It!	August 29, 2023	Covers strips from August 12, 2019 to February 15, 2020.	ISBN 978-1-5248-8129-0	Andrews McMeel Publishing
Big Nate: This Means War!	March 5, 2024	Covers strips from February 17, 2020 to August 16, 2020, and August 23, 2020.	ISBN 978-1-5248-8749-0	Andrews McMeel Publishing
Big Nate: Remain Calm!	September 3, 2024	Covers strips from September 6, 2020 to February 14, 21, and 28, March 22 to 27, and April 19 to May 1, 2021.	ISBN 978-1-5248-9043-8	Andrews McMeel Publishing
Big Nate: Attack of the Cheez Funk Breath!	March 11, 2025	Covers strips from February 15, 2021 to August 28, 2021. (excluding strips already in Big Nate: Remain Calm! but including a repeat of April 26 to May 1, 2021 strips)	ISBN 978-1-5248-8783-4	Andrews McMeel Publishing
Big Nate: No Harm Done!	September 2, 2025	Covers strips from August 15, 22, and 29, 2021 to February 19 and 27, 2022.	ISBN 979-8-8816-0590-2	Andrews McMeel Publishing
Big Nate: Code Red!	March 10, 2026	Covers strips from February 21 to August 27, 2022. (including a repeat of February 27, 2022 strip)	ISBN 979-8-8816-0242-0	Andrews McMeel Publishing
Big Nate: Curse of the Puffy Shorts!	September 1, 2026	Covers strips from 2022 and 2023.	ISBN 979-8-8816-0243-7	Andrews McMeel Publishing
Big Nate: Hero Time!	October 20, 2026	A treasury collection containing the entirety of Big Nate: Silent But Deadly and Big Nate Goes Bananas! in one book.	ISBN 979-8-8816-1462-1	Andrews McMeel Publishing
