= Big Nate: In a Class by Himself =

2010 book by Lincoln Peirce

- Front cover art
- Author: Lincoln Peirce
- Illustrator: Lincoln Peirce
- Language: English
- Series: Big Nate
- Genres: Fiction, children's literature
- Publisher: HarperCollins
- Publication date: March 23, 2010
- Media type: Print (Paperback and hardcover)
- Pages: 214
- ISBN: 0061944343
- LC Class: PZ7.P361Bi 2010
- Followed by: Big Nate: Strikes Again

Big Nate: In a Class by Himself (referred to as Big Nate: The Boy with the Biggest Head in the World in the United Kingdom, Ireland, and Australia) is a children's fiction novel based on the Big Nate comic strip, written and illustrated by American cartoonist Lincoln Peirce. It is the first of the Big Nate novel series, followed by Big Nate Strikes Again. It was published on March 23, 2010, by HarperCollins and was nominated in 2011 for a Children's Choice Book Award by the Children's Book Council.

== Plot ==
Nate Wright wakes up from a nightmare about his social studies class at P.S. 38. Nate sees his best friend Francis Pope reading his social studies textbook, and assumes that they were having a test. Finding ways to skip the test, Francis comes out of nowhere and tells Nate that they weren't having a test, much to Nate's relief. Nate arrives at school and realizes that he forgot his lunch, but his friend Teddy Ortiz gives him a fortune cookie which had the fortune: "You will surpass all others".

Nate attends homeroom and social studies with Mrs. Godfrey, who gives him a detention slip for insolence after catching him checking a list of insulting nicknames he came up with for her. In his subsequent English class, Nate tries to secretly write a love poem for his crush Jenny, only for his obnoxious teacher's pet classmate Gina to reveal this to both Jenny and her boyfriend Artur, another rival of Nate's. Nate ends up ripping up his poem and yells an insult to Gina, causing him to receive another detention slip from his English teacher, Ms. Clarke. During art class, Nate attempts to sneak one of his drawings into the display case just outside the classroom, but he messes up and makes a loud noise which gets him caught by his art teacher, Mr. Rosa, who gives him yet another detention slip.

During lunch, Nate attempts to break a world record in an effort to make the fortune come true, going for a speed-eating record by eating 148 servings of green beans in 10 minutes. Nate reluctantly starts the challenge, only for Principal Nichols to suddenly appear behind him and demand that he clean up the mess, only to slip on a puddle of bean juice and fall over, after which he demands that Nate come to his office for a lecture, during which Nate receives yet another detention slip.

Nate's meeting with Principal Nichols is followed by his gym class, which Nate is horrified to discover is being run for his psychopathic substitute teacher Coach John. While changing into his gym clothes in the locker room, Nate accidentally wets his gym shirts. Fearing humiliation, Nate quickly grabs a pair of extra-large shorts he finds in a duffel bag near the coaches' room, only to discover shortly thereafter that they belong to Coach John, who believes that Nate is making fun of him, for which he forces Nate to run wind sprints before giving him a fifth detention slip. During maths class, Nate gets into a tug of war with the maths teacher Mr. Staples for the pop quiz sheet because he forgot to do the back part of the sheet at the end of the quiz. Eventually the paper tears in half, resulting in a sixth detention slip.

Finally, Nate has science class with his elderly teacher, Mr. Galvin, whom is rumored by the students to have never laughed at anything. Nate decides to try to become the first person to make Mr. Galvin laugh, thereby achieving his fortune, though his efforts result in Mr. Galvin confiscating his special drawing pen. Later, however, Nate notices that his pen has opened and leaked whilst in Mr. Galvin's pocket, causing him to burst out laughing. Furious, Mr. Galvin gives Nate his seventh and final detention slip for five additional hours of detention.

The school day finishes, and Nate bitterly makes his way over to the detention room. Upon Nate presenting his slips, however, detention supervisor Mrs. Czerwicki informs Nate that he is the first student to have received seven detention slips in one day. Realizing that his fortune has "come true", Nate becomes ecstatic, in which he declares himself as a "school record holder", remarking that he "can hardly believe [his] good fortune".

== Characters ==
- Nate Wright - The main protagonist; an egocentric, naive, and sarcastic sixth-grader.
- Teddy Ortiz - Nate's other best friend who enjoys making jokes at Nate's expense.
- Francis Pope - Nate's best friend, who is known for his high intelligence.
- Marty Wright "Dad" - Nate's somewhat clueless father, who plays golf and is known to make horrible food.
- Ellen Wright - Nate's fifteen-year-old older sister, who is the opposite of Nate. She is highly favored by Ms. Godfrey, as she was once her student.
- Mrs. Clara Godfrey - Nate's social studies teacher, who he dislikes (which is shown by his twenty nicknames). In the book, she gives Nate a detention for his list of insulting nicknames for her.
- Gina Hemphill-Toms - Nate's nemesis and Mrs. Godfrey's favorite student in the class.
- Jenny Jenkins - Nate's love interest, whom he met in first grade. However, Jenny does not return Nate's feelings and instead goes out with Artur for "four months, six days, and three-and-a-half-hours", according to Nate.
- Artur Pashkov - Jenny's boyfriend and Nate's frenemy; a Belarusian who speaks some broken English and unintentionally annoys Nate with his superiority and great luck. Artur is unaware of Nate's feelings toward him and considers him a friend. The two's "rivalry" began when Artur beat him in chess and knocked him down to the second-best chess player in the chess club.
- Principal Wesley Nichols - Nate's school principal. In the book, he gives Nate detention for wasting lunch servings of green beans by spitting them out and making Nichols slip on them.
- Coach John - A substitute gym teacher at Nate's school who loves to show off his injuries and is described by Nate as a "sergeant without a uniform". In the book, he gives Nate detention for wearing his own gym shorts during class (as he thought Nate was trying to ridicule him), when Nate actually just needed them, as he accidentally poured water on his own, while trying to wash green beans off his mouth.
- Ms. Clarke - Nate's English teacher, who gave him detention for shouting at Gina for ruining his love poem to Jenny.
- Mr. Staples - Nate's math teacher, who gave him a bad grade and a detention for not finishing and ripping his math test (though this was because Nate did not realize there was a back side of the test and did not have time to finish). He is known to tell corny knock-knock jokes.
- Mr. Fontaine Galvin - Nate's science teacher, known for his boring personality and lack of laughter, who gave him detention for laughing at the ink of Nate's confiscated cartooning pen (as Nate tried to make him laugh at his Doctor Cesspool comic strip, and his other previous failed attempts) getting ink all over his shirt.
- Mr. Ken Rosa - Nate's art teacher, who gave Nate detention for destroying the knob off the spotlight case (where students' pictures is selected to be in there), after his failed attempt to outshine Artur by putting his picture in there.
- Mrs. Shipulski - Principal Nichols's secretary.
- Mrs. Czerwicki - The sullen detention monitor.
- Randy Betancourt - A rival of Nate's who tried to steal food from a bake sale in a flashback.

== Reception ==
Booklist and Publishers Weekly praised Big Nate: In a Class by Himself, with Publishers Weekly calling the character of Nate "sharp-witted and unflappable". Kirkus Reviews recommended the book as a read for "fans of Jeff Kinney's Wimpy Kid", stating that Pierce "skillfully and often hilariously imports his comic-strip character into a full-length story." The School Library Journal also gave the book a positive review, stating that "Kids will love Nate and all the trouble he gets into" and recommending it as a way to entice children into reading.
