= Ben Giroux =

American actor and director (born 1984)

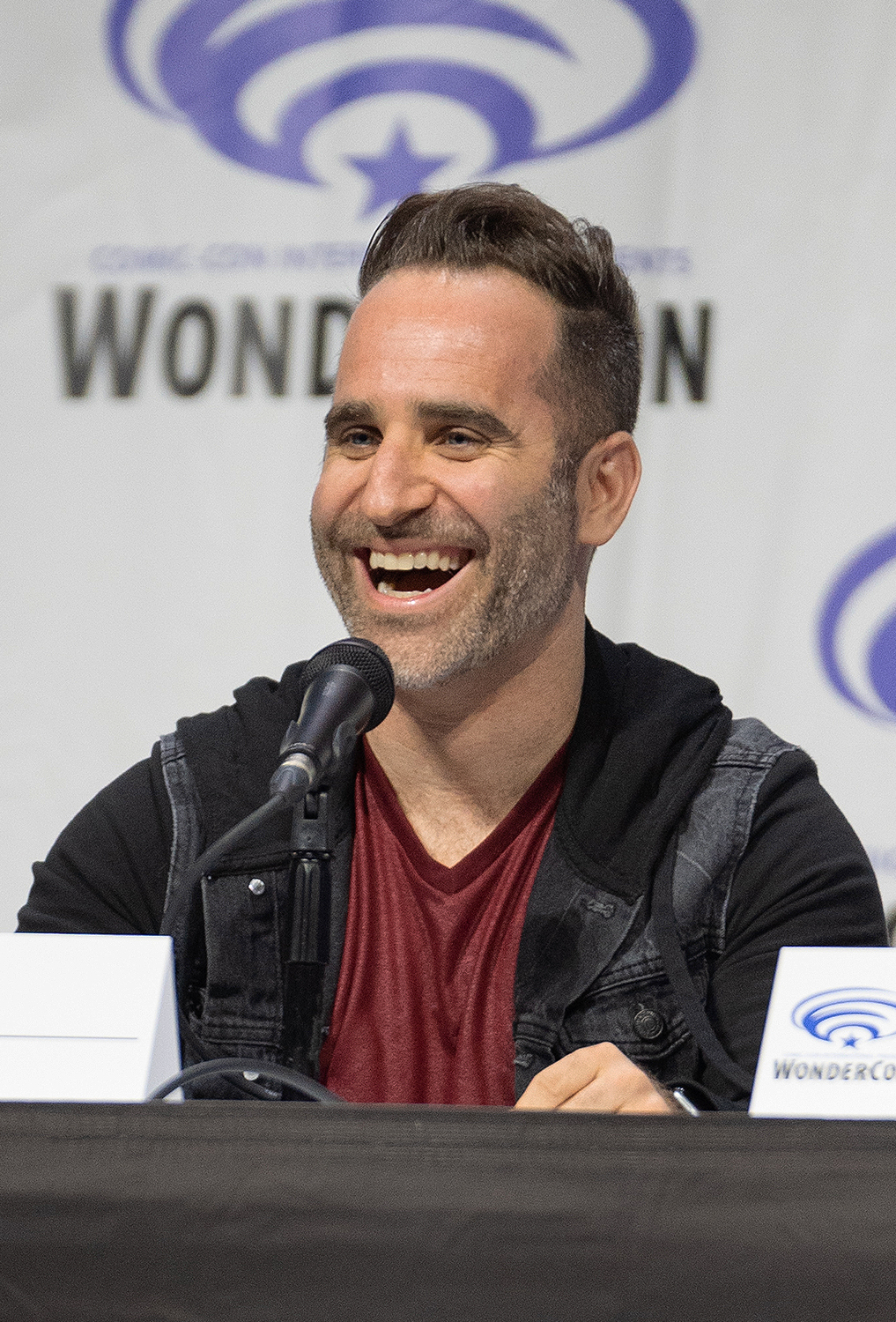
- Giroux at the 2019 WonderCon
- Born: October 24, 1984 (age 42); Phoenix, Arizona, U.S.
- Education: University of Southern California
- Occupations: Actor; director; producer
- Years active: 2005–present
- Website: https://bengiroux.com/

Benjamin Scott Giroux (born October 24, 1984) is an American actor and director.

== Career ==
Giroux started his career performing stand up comedy. He is best known for portraying the Toddler in Henry Danger, The Adventures of Kid Danger, and Danger Force on Nickelodeon, Mikey Munroe in Bunsen Is a Beast on Nickelodeon, and Little Zach in The CW’s Hart of Dixie, as well as voicing the main character in Big Nate from Nickelodeon on Paramount+.

== Personal life ==
Ben Giroux is Jewish.

== Filmography ==
=== Film ===
Year	Title	Role	Notes
2009	Santa Buddies	Clark	
2009	Thanks for Dying	Michael	
2013	Abner, the Invisible Dog	Kane	
2019	2nd Chance for Christmas	Toby	
2019	Batman vs. Teenage Mutant Ninja Turtles	Robin / Damian Wayne (voice)	
2022	Bromates	Josh	

=== Television ===
Year	Title	Role	Notes
2007	Psych	Jimmy Nicholas	Episode: "And Down the Stretch Comes Murder"
2008	Toradora!	Kota Tomiie (voice: English dub)	3 episodes
2009	House	Rick	Episode: "Teamwork"
2010	Bones	Sheriff Jerry Bonds	Episode: "The X in the File"
2010	Pair of Kings	Pupaley	Episode: "Where the Wild Kings Are"
2011	The Fresh Beat Band	Max	Episode: "Veloci-Rap-Star"
2012	The High Fructose Adventures of Annoying Orange	Ugly Princess of the Realm	Episode: "Sir Juice-a-Lot"
2013	Sam & Cat	Jeff Du Shell	Episode: "#FavoriteShow"
2014	The Haunted Hathaways	Rodney LeBuef	Episode: "Haunted Voodoo"
2014	2 Broke Girls	Eddie	Episode: "And the Free Money"
2014	Mighty Med	Dark Warrior	3 episodes
2014	Hart of Dixie	Little Zack	Recurring role
2014–2016, 2018, 2020	Henry Danger	The Toddler	Recurring role
2015	Kidnapped: The Hannah Anderson Story	Steven	TV film
2015	Best Friends Whenever	Mr. Canavan	Episode: "Shake Your Booty"
2016	NCIS	Tiny Tony	Episode: "Charade"
2016	Christmas in Vermont	Cyril	TV film
2017–2018	Bunsen Is a Beast	Mikey Munroe (voice)	Main role
2018	The Adventures of Kid Danger	Toddler, Drill Finger, Gilligan, Various voices	Recurring role
2019	Sydney to the Max	Derek (voice)	Episode: "Dancin' the Vida Loca"
2019–present	The Loud House	Various voices	4 episodes
2020, 2022	Danger Force	The Toddler	6 episodes
2020	The Big Show Show	Coach Fener	4 episodes
2020	Game On! A Comedy Crossover Event	Coach Fener	Episode: "The Big Show Show: The Big Games"
2020	Coop & Cami Ask the World	Mr. Bonavich	2 episodes
2021	Love, Death & Robots	Automated Customer Service Operator (voice)	Episode: "Automated Customer Service"
2021	DC Super Hero Girls	Jimmy Olsen (voice)	Episode: "#WorldsFinest"
2022–2024	Big Nate	Nate Wright (voice)	Lead role
2022	Tiny Toons Looniversity	Buster Bunny (voice)	pilot only
2026	Max & the Midknights	Nate Wright (voice)	2 episodes

=== Video games ===
Year	Title	Role
2014	D4: Dark Dreams Don't Die	Antonio "Rabbit" Zapatero
2020	The Walking Dead: Saints & Sinners	Casey
2020	XCOM: Chimera Squad	Additional voices
