= Big Nate: Strikes Again =

Book by Lincoln Peirce

Big Nate Strikes Again
- First edition
- Author: Lincoln Peirce
- Illustrator: Lincoln Peirce
- Language: English
- Series: Big Nate
- Genre: Comedy; Fictional; Children's novel Comic strip
- Publisher: HarperCollins Publishers
- Publication date: October 19, 2010
- Publication place: United States
- Media type: Print (Paperback and Hardcover)
- Pages: 224
- ISBN: 9780062009326
- Preceded by: Big Nate: In a Class by Himself
- Followed by: Big Nate: On a Roll

Big Nate Strikes Again is a realistic fiction novel by American cartoonist Lincoln Peirce. It is based on the comic strip and the second book in the Big Nate novel series. The book was released on October 19, 2010. It is aimed at children aged 8 to 12. It was published by HarperCollins Publishers. The book has a 13,928 sale rank.

== Plot ==
At Nate Wright's school, a board of the students' baby pictures is put up. Nate and his friend Teddy look at the pictures. Nate points out Gina's picture, because he thought it was his crush, Jenny's picture. Nate calls the picture 'beautiful', but Gina arrives and ridicules Nate.

In Mrs. Godfrey's first period social studies class, she assigns the students a research paper on a great American figure, which they will be doing with a randomly drawn partner. Nate is partnered with Gina, much to their dismay. After Gina tells Nate the historical figure they will be writing about is Benjamin Franklin, Nate discovers that he has been named a team captain in his school's intramural fleece ball tournament. Intramural sports are referred to as SPOFFs (Sports Played Only For Fun) by the students. After Nate's rival, Randy, discovers that he is a captain too and talks smack at Nate, Nate takes Randy to his overfilled locker where he buries Randy in a pile of trash in the locker.

After being disruptive in science class and being sent to the library, Nate decides to read books about Benjamin Franklin for his research project, and becomes very interested in him. After he returns to his science class where he receives a lecture from Mr. Galvin, he realizes that he missed the fleece ball captain's meeting, where he would have chosen team members. Fortunately, Coach has already written a team roster in Nate's absence, which included Francis, Teddy, and many good players. However, it also included Gina, who is not very athletic.

When Nate returns home to think of a name for his team, he gets a phone call from Gina to check on his progress, at which point his dad gets the wrong idea about the two of them. While Nate went upstairs to come up with a team name, his neighbor's dog, Spitsy, gives him an idea for a team name: the "Psycho Dogs".

When Nate arrives at school, Randy chases him to get revenge on Nate's locker trick the other day, resulting in Nate getting to go to the library to do research on his product, and Randy getting in trouble with the principal for running in the school. After writing some Ben Franklin comics, Nate goes to Art class, where he makes a good luck charm for his team, reminding him that he forgot to submit the team name. Nate gets to Coach Calhoun's office as quickly as he can, where he learns that Gina had submitted a team name already, the "Kuddle Kittens".

At lunch, Nate plans to get revenge on Gina by dumping egg salad on her, but he accidentally dumps it on Jenny instead. After the incident, Nate learns that his team will be playing Artur's team, the "Killer Bees" after school. The Kuddle Kittens prove themselves to be the superior team but still struggle due to Gina constantly committing errors to the point of ruining Nate's final swing, costing them the game.

Two days later, Nate is still trying to recover from the loss when Gina come over to work on the project. After she rejects Nate's comics, they get into an argument which leads to them making a deal: Nate will let Gina write the report so she can ensure her A^{+} grade average is sustained, and Gina will come up with excuses to get out of playing fleece ball, so Nate's team can stand a better chance at winning the Spoffy.

The day before the project is due and the final fleece ball game is held, Nate begins to sell copies of "Poor Nate's Almanack", inspired by Ben Franklin's Poor Richard's Almanack, until Principal Nichols tells Nate that he can't sell his Almanack during school hours and must take down his stand. As Nate and Teddy move the table, Randy comes running up with a notebook he stole from Chad, and accidentally runs into the table, giving himself a bloody nose. Randy immediately tries to accuse Nate for his injury, but Ms. Clarke saw what really happened and gives Randy detention, who mutters to Nate that payback time will come tomorrow.

The next day, Gina hands in the Ben Franklin research paper to Mrs. Godfrey, who reveals that she and Nate will receive a failing grade due to Gina using unoriginal visual aids, ruining her perfect academic record. But then Nate shows Mrs. Godfrey his Ben Franklin comics, which she finds delightful for their originality, and their connection to Ben Franklin being a cartoonist himself. She then awards the project an A^{+}, however Gina is furious as she knew the comics are the things that saved her academic record.

At the end of the day, the two fleece ball teams assemble to play the final game, with Gina going through with her part of the deal and sitting out, claiming to have food poisoning. The Kuddle Kittens and the Raptors go back and forth between the lead until Randy stomps on Nate's foot as hard as he could while making it look like an accident. Nate gets benched with a swelling foot, and Gina decides to play in the rest of the game. As Nate predicted, Gina misses the ball on the Raptors' last bat and they then lead with two points. When it is the Kuddle Kittens' last turn to bat, Francis and Teddy reach the bases with two outs, and Gina is up to bat last. Gina quickly gets two strikes but hits the last throw, resulting in a home run. Coach Calhoun declares the Kuddle Kittens the winners and gives the Spoffy (the trophy awarded at the end of SPOFFs) to Gina instead of Nate.

Later in the library, Nate writes about the Kuddle Kittens' victory in the latest edition of Poor Nate's Almanack, which Gina dislikes because Nate claimed it was a "lucky hit." They get into a minor argument, which Gina escalates by screaming at Nate about how he never studied a day in his life. This results in Mrs. Hickson, the librarian, writing Gina the first detention she ever received. In the end, Nate notes that if Ben Franklin were alive today, the two of them would get along very well.

== Characters ==
- Nate Wright - The main protagonist; a pre-adolescent boy, known for his large ego and sarcasm.
- Teddy Ortiz - Nate's #1A best friend, who is a jokester and known for his skill at Yo mama jokes.
- Francis Pope - Nate's #1 best friend, who is known for his over-the-top intelligent quotient, and Nate often calls him a geek.
- Marty Wright - Nate's somewhat clueless father, who plays golf and is known to make horrible food.
- Artur Pashkov - Jenny's boyfriend, and Nate's arch-rival; a Belarusian exchange student and speaks broken English. In the book, he plays a minor role, as his fleeceball team wins over "Kuddle Kittens."
- Gina Hemphill-Toms - The secondary antagonist as well as Nate's arch-nemesis and Ms. Godfrey's favorite student in the class. In the book, she & Nate are assigned to the roles of project partners (due to Nate's original partner being absent), and she ruins Nate's fleeceball team by joining and giving them the name: "Kuddle Kittens," angering Nate. In the end, she hits a home run, winning the team against the Raptors, and earning herself the Spoffy, a trophy, Nate was planning on winning.
- Randy Betancourt - One of Nate's rivals; the school bully. In the book, he is the main antagonist; the captain of Nate's opponent fleeceball team: the Raptors.
- Mrs. Clara Godfrey - Nate's ultimate nemesis; his social studies teacher at room 213.
- Ellen Wright - Nate's eleventh-grade annoying older sister.
- Jenny Jenkins - Nate's love interest and Arthur's girlfriend. In the book, like her boyfriend, she plays a minor role, as she is assigned project partners with Arthur, and Nate accidentally dumps egg salad all over her (he originally meant to do it to Gina).
- Chad Applewhite - One of Nate's friends. Like the previous book, he plays a minor role, as he is on Nate's fleece ball team, and annoys Nate by cheering on Gina on their match against the Raptors.

== Reception ==
Critical reception has been positive, with the School Library Journal writing that the book was "clever and funny". Booklist praised the book's "easy-reading narrative" and Kirkus Reviews called the book "A latter-day Peanuts and a kinder, gentler Diary of a Wimpy Kid."

== See also ==
- Diary of a Wimpy Kid
- The Epic Tales of Captain Underpants episodes
