= Big Nate: In the Zone =

Book by Lincoln Peirce

- Author: Lincoln Peirce
- Illustrator: Lincoln Peirce
- Language: English
- Series: Big Nate
- Genre: Comedy; Children's novel Comic strip
- Publisher: HarperCollins Publishers
- Publication date: March 11, 2014
- Publication place: United States
- Media type: Print (Paperback and Hardcover)
- Pages: 224
- ISBN: 9780061996658
- Preceded by: Big Nate: Flips Out
- Followed by: Big Nate: Lives It Up

Big Nate: In the Zone is a children's novel by American cartoonist Lincoln Peirce. It is based on the comic strip and is the 6th book in the Big Nate novel series. The book was released in March 11, 2014 and it is aimed at children aged 8 to 12. It was published by HarperCollins Publishers.

== Plot ==
Nate is being yelled at by Principal Nichols because Teddy accidentally destroyed his War of 1812 outline. Nate then sarcastically states that his life is great. During the past week, he has had a terrible case of bad luck, including failing grades, cavities, and being easily made fun of. Later, after Nate fails to turn in his outline, he is tasked with completing another one.

After finishing, he notices Jenny and Artur, who are rather obnoxiously displaying love. An envious Nate then makes a list of horrible pet names that he feels Artur should be called. Chad appears and notices Nate. After being asked what he was working on, Nate lies quickly and says he was about to start a comic. Chad is also starring. Chad, who has a crush on Maya, asks Nate if she could be saved by him. Nate finishes the comic and is prompted by Chad to start thinking about life with superpowers.

The bad luck, however makes Nate suppose he could theoretically simulate landing after flying. Nate jumps off a table and on to a beanbag, bursting it wide open. Nate is then yelled at for the third time of the day. Nate and Chad are given detention and asked to fix the beanbag chair. While fixing it, the home economics teacher, Mrs. Brindle, mentions a "fitness zone". After they are done, they notice that due to the new program, all the snacks in the vending machine have gone completely healthy. Dee Dee shows up and says that Nate has to report to the principal's office. Nate arrives and is greeted by Nichols. Nichols states that the fitness zone needs to be welcomed in a popular way: music. Nichols then asks Nate to create a song out of the rules of the fitness zone. Nichols also cancels Nate and Chad's detentions, due to the fact that Nate and Chad have a role in their band, Enslave The Mollusk.

After school, ETM (Enslave The Mollusk) creates a rock anthem called "You're Never Alone In The Fitness Zone". When Artur is assigned to take the rules and convert them to lyrics, Nate's terrible luck causes Artur to notice the list of pet names, resulting in him quitting out of embarrassment. Without a lead singer, ETM has to choose between Nate, Francis (both have "natural disasters" for voices) and Teddy (not skilled enough to sing and play at the same time). They choose on Nate, him having an edge over Francis. The next day, Nate comes down with nerves and forgets the lyrics, making ETM a laughingstock, especially teased by a 7th-grader named Marcus Goode. The next week, Nate gets a D in Social Studies. He is then given a lucky charm by Chad, which he refers to as "the Foot". Immediately, good luck happens everywhere in Nate's life. He is able to shoot a hoop that barely touches the net from mid-court, backwards, and with his eyes closed, a math test is postponed, a free period is given to Nate, and he is given $20.

Unfortunately, Maya is shown to be going out with Marcus. Later, Nate's Dad gives him a punishment of no drawing comics before bed. Nate loopholes around this and draws on his sneakers. The stylized sneakers make him more popular than Marcus, causing Marcus to be very envious of Nate. Over the next week, Nate becomes "in the zone". He is asked to sign other kids' sneakers, his punishment is canceled, he is the MVP of back-to-back shutouts in soccer, and gets perfect scores on all his tests. However, he realizes is becoming like Artur. Nate mentally digresses and asks Artur to rejoin ETM. After successfully inviting Artur back, Coach Calhoun tells them about field day. Marcus and Maya appear and Marcus makes a bet that 6th-grade will not win a single event on Field Day as well as teasing Chad. Maya steps up and tells Marcus to stop, stating "What's he ever done to you!?", then breaking up with Marcus. Nate then gives the Foot to Chad so he can try to hook up with a remorseful Maya.

However, the luck stops, as in a turn of events, the Foot ends up in Mrs. Godfrey's desk. On Field Day, the 6th-graders are given the sports they are the worst at. Nate has to do hurdles. Though able to gain a head start, he trips over the last hurdle. The last sport is the three-legged race. Nate and Artur team up to make sure that Chad and Maya are a team. Soon, because Marcus and his partner do not work together, while Maya and Chad do, Nate wins the bet. The next week, an assembly is announced to give ETM a second chance. Before playing, Nate reveals that if he lost the bet, he would become a mini Marcus for a week. He states that Marcus is about to be defamed. The song is a success, and Marcus is embarrassed in front of the school with Chad hitting Marcus' head with a bottle.

== Characters ==
- Nate Wright: a rebellious 6th-grader and the main protagonist.
- Chad Applewhite: one of Nate's friends.
- Marcus Goode: a 7th-grade bully and the main antagonist.
- Francis Pope: Nate's best friend.
- Teddy Ortiz: Nate's other best friend.
- Maya: the love interest of Chad.
- Artur Pashkov: the singer of ETM and Jenny's exchange student boyfriend.
- Jenny Jenkins: Artur's girlfriend and the girl whom Nate has a crush on, though she does not reciprocate.
