= Big Nate (TV series) =

American animated television series

- Genre: Comedy
- Based on: The comic and book series by Lincoln Peirce
- Developed by: Mitch Watson
- Voices of: Ben Giroux; Dove Cameron; Rob Delaney; Arnie Pantoja; Charlie Schlatter; Kevin Michael Richardson; Carolyn Hennesy; Daniel MK Cohen; Bryce Charles; Ali Stroker
- Music by: Frederik Wiedmann
- Country of origin: United States
- Original language: English
- No. of seasons: 2
- No. of episodes: 52

Production
- Executive producers: John Cohen; Mitch Watson
- Producer: Amy McKenna
- Running time: 22–23 minutes
- Production companies: John Cohen Productions; Nickelodeon Animation Studio

Original release
- Network: Paramount+
- Release: February 17, 2022 – August 26, 2024

Big Nate is an American animated television series developed by Mitch Watson and based on the comic strip and book series of the same name by Lincoln Peirce. It follows the adventures of the titular protagonist, alongside his friends, in sixth grade. The executive producers are Mitch Watson and John Cohen. Peirce is also collaborating with the producers for the show. The show premiered on Paramount+ on February 17, 2022. In March 2022, the series was renewed for a second season, which premiered on July 7, 2023.

On March 28, 2024, the series was removed from Paramount+ as part of a "strategic decision to focus on content with mass global appeal". Production on the series ended on July 25, 2024. Despite the removal from Paramount+, most episodes of the show are still available to purchase on digital platforms. On August 26, 2024, every season two episode, including all of the previously unreleased episodes of the season, were put on Apple TV and Amazon Prime for purchase.

== Premise ==
Big Nate follows the adventures and misadventures of Nate Wright, a semi-incompetent, spirited, and rebellious sixth-grader. His friend group includes Francis, Dee Dee, Teddy, and Chad. Nate hates social studies teacher Mrs. Godfrey, whom he considers his nemesis and calls her names like "the school's Godzilla", and tends to run afoul of her, the firm Principal Nichols, and the aging science teacher Mr. Galvin. At home, Nate lives with his single father Martin and older sister Ellen.

== Characters ==
- Nate Wright (voiced by Ben Giroux), a semi-incompetent, spirited, rebellious 11-year old sixth-grader, who loves to pull pranks and draw cartoons.
- Ellen Wright (voiced by Dove Cameron), Nate's girly antagonistic older sister who is responsible and mature.
- Martin Wright (voiced by Rob Delaney), the clueless single father of Nate and Ellen.
- Francis Pope (voiced by Daniel MK Cohen), one of Nate's friends in his friend group, who is smart and intelligent.
- Dee Dee Holloway (voiced by Bryce Charles), one of Nate's friends in his friend group and the president of the school's drama club. Unlike the comic strip, she is a lesbian.
- Teddy Ortiz (voiced by Arnie Pantoja), one of Nate's friends in his friend group who is comedic and loves to tell jokes and annoy Nate. He is half-Mexican-American, and half-Puerto-Rican.
- Chad Applewhite (voiced by Charlie Schlatter), one of Nate's friends in his friend group, who is a red-headed chubby kid who loves food.
- Principal Nichols (voiced by Kevin Michael Richardson), the principal at P.S. 38.
- Mrs. Godfrey (voiced by Carolyn Hennesy), Nate's social studies teacher and arch-nemesis.
- Amy (voiced by Ali Stroker), a character specifically created for the TV series, she is one of Nate's friends in his friend group from New York, who is Dee Dee’s girlfriend, and uses an electric wheelchair like her actress. She first appeared in the episode: "Sixtween Candles".

== Release ==
The series was originally planned to premiere on Nickelodeon in September 2021. However, in December 2021, with the casting, it was announced that it would premiere on Paramount+ in early 2022, later specified as February 17. On August 3, 2022, it was announced that nine new episodes would release on Paramount+ on August 19, 2022. The series began airing on Nickelodeon on September 5, 2022.

== Production ==
In 1991, the first year the Big Nate comic was published, Peanuts executive producer Lee Mendelson purchased the option from Lincoln Peirce to make an animated Big Nate television series for Saturday-morning cartoons at NBC; Peirce "was paid $5,000 to write a quote-on-quote bible describing the characters and outlining a few story ideas". However, the day after this deal was finalized, all NBC Saturday-morning cartoons were cancelled, and development on the initial series was scrapped.

On February 19, 2020, Nickelodeon announced an animated Big Nate series. Nickelodeon's executive vice president of animation production and development, Ramsey Ann Naito, stated that she had wanted to adapt the Big Nate book series into an animated series for a long time.

On March 24, 2022, the series was renewed for a second season of 10 episodes. On August 3, 2022, it was announced that 10 additional episodes were ordered for the second season. On June 22, 2023, it was announced that the second season would premiere on July 7, 2023.

== Episodes ==
=== Series overview ===
Series overview
Season	Episodes		Originally released
1	26	8	February 17, 2022
1	26	9	August 19, 2022
1	26	9	December 26, 2022
2	26	10	July 7, 2023
2	26	16	August 26, 2024

=== Season 1 (2022) ===
No. overall	No. in season	Title	Directed by	Written by	Original release date	First linear air date	Prod. code	U.S. linear viewers (millions)
1	1	"The Legend of the Gunting"	Kimberly Jo Mills & Jim Mortensen	Mitch Watson	February 17, 2022	September 5, 2022	101	0.20
Nate finds out that he is one detention away from being "gunted", a myth where someone is rumored to disappear from five detentions in one week. Nate tries to go the whole week without getting any detentions. But he is asked to show a troublemaking new kid, Bentley Carter around the school, who is determined to become Nate's prank partner. Guest stars: Jack Black as Brad Gunter, Danny Jacobs as Bentley Carter
2	2	"Go Nate, It's Your Birthday"	Jeff DeGrandis & Jim Mortensen	Elliott Owen	February 17, 2022	September 9, 2022	102	0.23
It's Nate's birthday and his father Martin lets him borrow his credit card for the day, as long as he can spend under $50.00. But Nate accidentally maxes the credit card out and tries to find a way to pay off the debt that he owes. Meanwhile, Martin helps Nate's sister, Ellen get over her claustrophobia for the Iditarod race.
3	3	"Valentine's Day of Horror"	Kyle Neswald	Kelly Fullerton & Mitch Watson	February 17, 2022	October 21, 2022	103	0.13
It's Valentine's Day and Nate tries to find a grand gesture for his true love, Jenny. He finds one after winning the school's art contest and winning a pizza party for the entire school. Little does he know that the pizza gives everyone food poisoning as Principal Nichols works to contain the situation before the school inspectors show up.
4	4	"CATastrophe"	Jeff DeGrandis & Jim Mortensen	Sarah Allan	February 17, 2022	September 16, 2022	105	0.20
For Science, Nate is paired up with Jenny for the Rube Goldberg project. But when he comes to her house to make the project, he finds out she has a cat that he is scared of and tries to get over his ailurophobia. Meanwhile, Ellen tries to cure Martin's fear of public restrooms.
5	5	"The Pimple"	Kyle Neswald	Emily Brundige	February 17, 2022	September 16, 2022	106	0.24
Nate gets his first pimple to which he finds a disaster at first, but he soon finds out that it is lucky for everyone when they touch it. Meanwhile, Dee Dee gets the substitute drama teacher of her dreams. Guest star: Kimberly Brooks as Donna
6	6	"Belles a Ringin'"	Kimberly Jo Mills	Ben Lapides	February 17, 2022	September 23, 2022	107	0.21
Ellen is heartbroken when she breaks up with her boyfriend, Gordie, so Nate buys romance novels for her. But Nate finds out they are major cash cows, so he writes one of his own titled "Belles a Ringin'". The publishers love the book and want him to make more novels. Nate writes more novels, with the help of his friends, about people's personal lives.
7	7	"Time Disruptors"	Tanner Johnson	Eric Shaw & Mitch Watson	February 17, 2022	September 30, 2022	108	0.19
Nate makes plans for the upcoming P.S. 38 costume ball, based on the Legend of the Homeschooled Corn Girl, and plans to dress as the Time Disruptors, a superhero group that Nate claims is the most epic franchise in cinema. But Nate finds out that Francis is not helping as much as him and finds out that he is tutoring a girl from their rival school Jefferson Middle School whom he soon falls in love with. Nate also finds out Jefferson is having a masquerade ball on the same day of their dance.
8	8	"Wilderness Warriors"	Kyle Neswald	Sarah Allan	February 17, 2022	January 13, 2023	109	0.29
The sixth grade at P.S. 38 goes on a camping trip overseen by Mrs. Godfrey and Nate is determined to win the Wilderness Warrior award. Meanwhile, Dee Dee tries to get over her fear of camping. Also, Principal Nichols and Mr. Galvin plan to steal a bald eagle egg to raise small funds for the school.
9	9	"Best Laid Cell Plans"	Kyle Neswald	Emily Brundige	August 19, 2022	April 12, 2023	115	0.12
Nate and his friends find out that Francis has a cell phone for emergencies. They immediately use it all the time, but Nate accidentally makes a video that shows him saying "I Love Gina" while really imitating Mrs. Godfrey. This causes the whole school to think Nate has a crush on Gina. Kim Cressly, a girl who also has a crush on Nate, holds both Nate and Gina hostage in her basement to find out if Nate really likes Gina.
10	10	"Game Over"	Kimberly Jo Mills	Mitch Watson	August 19, 2022	April 18, 2023	116	0.10
Nate finds out he is the reason for the cancellation of lizards after a screening of a lizard show. So, Nate tries to save the class pet lizard Shelia who he accidentally let out of the school after he found out she was pregnant. Little does he know that Shelia and her baby lizards are really crawling through the air vents of the school.
11	11	"'Til Death Do We Rock"	Kyle Neswald	Emily Brundige	August 19, 2022	March 4, 2023	112	0.17
Nate's band "Fear the Mollusk" tells him that his singing is not good and instead hires Nate's rival Artur as the lead singer, much to Nate's dismay. Meanwhile, Martin gets a job as a bathroom attendant, but accidentally tells Nate that he is a CEO for a catering company.
12	12	"Randy's Mom Has Got It Goin' On"	Kimberly Jo Mills	Sarah Allan	August 19, 2022	April 17, 2023	113	0.16
Martin falls in love with Randy's mom, Barbara, much to Nate's dismay as Randy always picks on him. They start to get along together as Randy never gets in trouble. But after seeing Randy dismantle Teddy's uncle's property, Nate thinks he is a jerk again. Ellen tells Nate she found an engagement ring in Martin's room. Thinking they could become brothers, Nate teams up with Randy to make Martin and Barbara break up with each other. Guest star: Nasim Pedrad as Barbara
13	13	"Ghostly Coven of Man Witches"	Kimberly Jo Mills	Michael Ryan	August 19, 2022	October 14, 2022	104	0.14
To get rid of a science test, Nate and his friends sneak into the school at night to put out Halloween decorations to make it look like it's haunted. But Nate hears noises and finds things that could tell that the school could actually be haunted by a ghostly coven of man-witches. Meanwhile, Martin attends a funeral of an old friend that was a clown where he dresses up as a clown. But chaos ensues on the way back home.
14	14	"The Future is Fuzzy"	Tanner Johnson	Sarah Allan	August 19, 2022	April 19, 2023	117	0.11
During gym class, Nate gets hit by a dodgeball and gets a syneos injury that makes him predict the weather. He becomes an intern for the local weatherman, Wink Summers. Meanwhile, Dee Dee thinks that a new kid in the drama club is stealing her spotlight.
15	15	"The Big Freeze"	Kimberly Jo Mills	Ben Lapides	August 19, 2022	March 11, 2024 (Nicktoons)	110	0.03
Nate and Team Awesome go against Jefferson Middle School in the annual snow sculpture contest, the Big Freeze, and whoever wins it gets a snack machine for the school. Nate learns Nolan, a long-time rival, is in the Jefferson team and does whatever it takes to beat him.
16	16	"The Curse of the Applewhites"	Tanner Johnson	Lissy Klatchko	August 19, 2022	April 11, 2023	111	0.12
Nate is assigned to do figure skating in gym class while his friends get to do hockey, much to his dismay. He gets Chad to be his figure skating partner, but learns there is an ancient figure skating curse in his family. Meanwhile, Nate's friends try to teach Martin how to say "no" to Nate.
17	17	"The Thing That Wouldn't Leave"	Tanner Johnson	Ben Lapides	August 19, 2022	April 10, 2023	114	0.12
Nate spends Spring Break with Francis's family where they visit Rhinelander, Wisconsin. Nate discovers their planned schedule and tries it on his family. It doesn't work and he moves with Francis's family without Martin and Ellen noticing. He sees their schedule at home, but disaster starts when his neat freak alter ego, Nathaniel kicks in. Meanwhile, Martin and Ellen are asked to dog-sit Spitsy, but lose him and wonder where Nate is.
18	18	"Kindness Wars"	Kyle Neswald	Emily Brundige	December 26, 2022	April 24, 2023	118	0.15
Artur does a favor for Nate by writing his report when it was due. Nate feels indebted and tries to do more kind things for him to even the scales, but Artur does plenty more things for Nate. Meanwhile, Francis is picked on by Randy, so Kim teaches him to channel his inner Kim. Also, the teachers try to make the largest blueberry for the Annual Rackleff Blueberry Contest.
19	19	"Wait Until Dark"	Kimberly Jo Mills	Ben Lapides	December 26, 2022	March 11, 2024 (Nicktoons)	119	0.02
Martin and Ellen are heading out of town so Nate is excited to be at home all by himself. But when he hears that zombie wolves are attacking through town, he is questioning his decision to be all by himself. Meanwhile, Martin finds out the event he is heading to is actually next week, so he heads home which is harder than he expected.
20	20	"The Square Root of Teddy"	Tanner Johnson	Emily Brundige	December 26, 2022	September 18, 2023	120	0.08
Mrs. Godfrey has a standardized test in her class and Teddy gets a perfect score. He is considered a genius and is asked to compete in the math competition the Numberdome. Francis is struggling with his identity as the smartest kid in the sixth grade, so his friends help him enter the Numberdome.
21	21	"Six-Tween Candles"	Kyle Neswald	Sarah Allan	December 26, 2022	September 19, 2023	121	0.16
It's Dee Dee's birthday and Dee Dee is very excited. But her friends and her parents are too busy setting up her surprise party and they try to hide any single detail. This makes Dee Dee feel left out and she ends up spending the day with a new girl in her class Amy. Guest star: Ali Stroker as Amy
22	22	"It's Lonely at the Top"	Tanner Johnson	Sarah Allan	December 26, 2022	September 21, 2023	123	0.14
Nate is elected for the Student Safety Sergeant, much to Gina's dismay. But he makes plenty of fun rules that make the whole school go crazy, which leaves him unprepared. Meanwhile, Principal Nichols finds out all of the other teachers hang out without him outside school which causes him to fit into their inner circle.
23	23	"Nate in Shining Armor"	Kimberly Jo Mills	Ben Lapides	December 26, 2022	September 26, 2023	125	N/A
All of the students in the sixth grade are asked to show 5th graders around the school and see if they want to come to P.S. 38 next year. But Nate's "new friend", Leah acts like a person from the medieval times which seems to be a problem. So Nate tries to act like her knight to get her to P.S. 38. Meanwhile, Martin and Ellen come to Teddy's Uncle Pedro's help to make a garden for their backyard. Guest Star: Valeria Rodriguez as Leah
24	24	"Bro-king Up Is Hard To Do"	Kyle Neswald	Emily Brundige	December 26, 2022	September 25, 2023	124	0.14
Nate falls into a bromance with Ellen's cool new boyfriend Blade, much to Ellen's dismay. So she tries to separate both of them from each other. Meanwhile, Principal Nichols asks "Fear the Mollusk" to make a new school anthem for P.S. 38. Guest star: Xolo Maridueña as Blade
25	25	"Nate on a Hot Tin Roof"	Kimberly Jo Mills	Ben Lapides	December 26, 2022	September 20, 2023	122	0.11
Nate is given so many detentions that the teachers put him on "Nate Watch". To get out of this, Nate helps Dee Dee put on the new musical and casts the teachers as the stars, but things don't go as well as expected. Guest star: Ali Stroker as Amy
26	26	"The April Fool"	Tanner Johnson	Sarah Allan	December 26, 2022	September 27, 2023	126	0.16
It's April Fools Day and Nate tries to find the perfect prank inspired by his hero Brad Gunter, but things get crazier when he sees him in person. Meanwhile, Principal Nichols tries to hide himself from all the pranks planned. Guest star: Mick Wingert as Brad Gunter

=== Season 2 (2023-24) ===
No. overall	No. in season	Title	Directed by	Written by	Original release date	First linear air date (all Nicktoons)	Prod. code	U.S. linear viewers (millions)
27	1	"The Curse of Eewcorpico"	Kimberly Jo Mills	Emily Brundige	July 7, 2023	March 12, 2024	201	0.04
28	2	"The Curse of Eewcorpico"	Victoria Harris & Tanner Johnson	Ben Lapides	July 7, 2023	March 13, 2024	202	0.05
29	3	"Mouth Brow Madness"	Kimberly Jo Mills	Ben Lapides	July 7, 2023	March 18, 2024	205	0.03
30	4	"Flavor Blasted Beardy Yum Yums"	Kimberly Jo Mills	Mitch Watson	July 7, 2023	March 20, 2024	208	N/A
31	5	"Bum Rap"	Kyle Neswald	Sarah Allan	July 7, 2023	March 14, 2024	203	0.01
32	6	"A Star is Torn"	Victoria Harris	Emily Brundige	July 7, 2023	March 18, 2024	206	0.03
33	7	"Valentine's Day of Horror: Chapter II"	Kyle Neswald	Lissy Klatchko	July 7, 2023	March 19, 2024	207	0.03
34	8	"Nate Wright's Day Off"	Kyle Neswald	Sarah Allan	July 7, 2023	March 15, 2024	204	0.08
35	9	"Rackleff's G.O.A.T."	Victoria Harris	Sarah Allan	July 7, 2023	March 21, 2024	209	N/A
36	10	"The Ballad of Big Nate"	Kyle Neswald & Sam Koji Hale	Story by : Sam Koji Hale & Mitch Watson; Written by : Mitch Watson	July 7, 2023	March 22, 2024	210	0.03
37	11	"The Real Kids of P.S. 38"	Kimberly Jo Mills	Sarah Allan	August 26, 2024	TBA	211	N/A
38	12	"Holy Pierogis"	Victoria Harris	Ben Lapides	August 26, 2024	TBA	212	N/A
39	13	"The Tween's Gambit"	Kyle Neswald	Ben Lapides	August 26, 2024	TBA	213	N/A
40	14	"Nate Wright Has Left the Building"	Kimberly Jo Mills	Sarah Allan	August 26, 2024	TBA	214	N/A
41	15	"Speed Bump Brawl"	Victoria Harris	Alex van der Hoek	August 26, 2024	TBA	215	N/A
42	16	"NATESgiving"	Kyle Neswald	Ben Lapides	August 26, 2024	TBA	217	N/A
43	17	"Field of Nightmares"	Kimberly Jo Mills	Lissy Klatchko	August 26, 2024	TBA	216	N/A
44	18	"Exes Machina"	Victoria Harris	Story by : Sam Koji Hale; Teleplay by : Elliott Owen	August 26, 2024	TBA	218	N/A
45	19	"Scarytale Endings"	Kimberly Jo Mills	Ben Lapides	August 26, 2024	TBA	219	N/A
46	20	"Rackleff's a Dump"	Kyle Neswald	Sarah Allan	August 26, 2024	TBA	220	N/A
47	21	"Nate Eat World"	Victoria Harris	Lissy Klatchko	August 26, 2024	TBA	221	N/A
48	22	"Carlotha the Sloth-a"	Kyle Neswald	Alex van der Hoek	August 26, 2024	TBA	222	N/A
49	23	"The Unsittable One"	Kimberly Jo Mills	Michael Ryan	August 26, 2024	TBA	223	N/A
50	24	"Norchaborf"	Victoria Harris	Sarah Allan	August 26, 2024	TBA	224	N/A
51	25	"Extreme Makeover: Gym Teacher Edition"	Kyle Neswald	Elliott Owen	August 26, 2024	TBA	225	N/A
52	26	"Fuller House"	Victoria Harris	Ben Lapides	August 26, 2024	TBA	226	N/A

=== Shorts ===
No.	Title	Original release date	Nickelodeon air date	Prod. code	U.S. linear viewers (millions)
1	"Theater Antics"	January 18, 2022	February 4, 2022	112B 103	0.21
2	"How to Pull a Proper Prank"	January 18, 2022	February 4, 2022	112A 101	0.21
3	"The Butt Cheeks Song"	January 25, 2022	February 18, 2022	115B 104	0.22
4	"Spitsy's Barking Lessons"	January 25, 2022	February 11, 2022	114A 105	0.27
5	"How to Get Ripped or Die Tryin'"	February 1, 2022	February 11, 2022	114B 106	0.27
6	"Locker Makeover Day"	February 1, 2022	February 18, 2022	115C 107	0.22
7	"Picture Day"	February 8, 2022	February 25, 2022	116A 108	0.26
8	"How to Annoy Your Older Sister"	February 17, 2022 (Note: This short was first uploaded to the Nickelodeon Cartoon Universe YouTube channel on February 11, 2022.)	February 18, 2022	115A 102	0.22
9	"Bad Hamster"	July 15, 2022 (Note: Released theatrically in front of Paws of Fury: The Legend of Hank.)	TBA	116B 109	N/A

== Reception ==
=== Critical response ===
Ashley Moulton from Common Sense Media gave the series three-out-of-five stars, stating "like the book series the show is based on, the TV show is likely to be loved by kids and to divide parents."

=== Awards and nominations ===
Year	Award	Category	Nominee(s)	Result	Refs
2022	Children's and Family Emmy Awards	Outstanding Casting for an Animated Program	Roxanne Escatel, Amanda Goodbread, Amy Zeis	Nominated	
2022	Children's and Family Emmy Awards	Outstanding Main Title and Graphics	David Skelly, Sam Koji Hale, Jim Mortensen, Dennis Shelby, Vicki Scott	Nominated	
2023	Annie Awards	Best Animated Television/Broadcast Production for Children	"The Legend of the Gunting"	Nominated	
2023	Annie Awards	Outstanding Achievement for Writing in an Animated Television / Broadcast Production	Mitch Watson, Emily Brundige, Ben Lapides and Sarah Allan (for "The Legend of the Gunting")	Nominated	
2023	GLAAD Media Awards	Outstanding Kids and Family Programming - Animated	Big Nate	Nominated	
