= Big Nate: Flips Out =

Book by Lincoln Peirce

Big Nate Flips Out
- Author: Lincoln Peirce
- Illustrator: Lincoln Peirce
- Language: English
- Series: Big Nate
- Genre: Comedy; Children's novel Comic strip
- Publisher: HarperCollins Publishers
- Publication date: February 5, 2013
- Publication place: United States
- Media type: Print (Paperback and Hardcover)
- Pages: 216
- ISBN: 9780062009326
- Preceded by: Big Nate: Goes for Broke
- Followed by: Big Nate: In the Zone

Big Nate Flips Out is a children's fiction novel written and illustrated by American cartoonist Lincoln Peirce, and is the fifth book in the Big Nate novel series (based on Peirce's own comic strip of the same name). The book was released in February 5, 2013, and was published by HarperCollins Publishers.

== Plot ==
During school one day, Nate, Francis and Teddy learn that the school is having a yearbook meeting. Remembering how badly the last year's yearbook turned out, the three decide to attend the meeting to make the new yearbook more "memorable". Upon arriving, however, Nate discovers to his shock that Gina has been made the editor for the yearbook. Fearing that Gina will make the yearbook all about herself, Nate decides to nominate Francis to be the yearbook's co-editor, and Gina is forced to comply when Mrs. Hickson approves of the request.

Wanting to take candids for the yearbook, Nate asks Francis to obtain one of the school's cameras from Mrs. Godfrey. Francis agrees to do so, but expresses concerns over Nate's messy tendencies, and makes him promise to keep the camera safe. An encounter with school bully Randy Betancourt in the school yard almost ends in disaster, after Randy snatches the camera from Nate and throws it into the air, but Nick Blonsky (a dimwitted, troublesome student who was responsible for everything that went wrong with the previous year's yearbook) manages to catch the camera before it hits the ground, and hands it back to Nate, though not after he accuses Nate of being irresponsible with the camera.

The next day, Nate overhears Dee Dee asking Gina to jump rope with her, and gets the idea to use the opportunity to get an embarrassing photo of her. After opening his overstuffed locker, however, Nate is unable to locate the camera. Francis gets mad at Nate, accusing him of losing the camera, and blaming it on him being a slob. In the ensuing argument, Nate accidentally reveals that Francis's middle name is "Butthurst" (which Nate had promised in third grade to keep a secret). Immediately regretting his action, Nate tries to apologise, only for Francis to storm off.

The next morning, Nate postulates the idea that Randy stole the camera from his locker, and tells Dee Dee his theory. Whilst preparing for first period, Nate, Dee Dee and Teddy overhear Francis talking to Mrs. Godfrey, during which he takes responsibility for losing the camera. Nate, Teddy and Dee Dee then get the idea to have Teddy's uncle Pedro hypnotise Nate into becoming neat and organised, believing that it will help them find the camera and reinstate Nate's friendship with Francis. The hypnotism works, and Nate ends up cleaning both his bedroom and his locker, but he still doesn't find the camera, and the hypnotism also starts to prevent him from enjoying his own hobbies and interests.

Nate's change in personality causes Principal Nichols to make him a hall monitor. During his shift, Nate notices Nick Blonsky, who appears to be holding the camera, but Nick ends up escaping before he can confront him. During lunch in the cafetorium, Nate sees Randy bullying Francis about his middle name, causing him to lose his temper and attack Randy. Mrs. Czerwicki intervenes and sends Nate to the principal's office. After a lecture from Principal Nichols, Nate encounters Francis, who asks him about Pedro's hypnotism. During the conversation, Nate shows Francis his clean locker, only to discover the camera is inside. Nick then appears and confesses that he stole the camera, just because he wanted to see how Nate and Francis would react. Suddenly, Dee Dee appears and reveals that she secretly recorded the confession on her phone, and Nick flees in embarrassment. At Dee Dee's encouragement, Nate and Francis reconcile their friendship, and Nate realizes that the fight with Randy has made him a slob again after Dee Dee points out the dirtiness of his shirt.

The incident with the camera causes Nick to be suspended for a week. A few days later, the school holds their annual Trivia Slam, giving Nate the opportunity to take the candids. Thanks to Nate's phobia of cats, Nate answers the winning question correctly, and Nate's team beats Gina's team. Francis ultimately ends up deciding that he likes Nate better as a slob.

== Characters ==
These characters appear in the book:

- Nate Wright - The main protagonist; a preadolescent boy, known for his large ego and sarcasm.
- Teddy Ortiz - Nate's #1A best friend, who is a jokester and known for his skill at Yo mama jokes. The book is less focused on him.
- Francis Pope - Nate's #1 best friend, who is known for his high intelligence. He breaks up with Nate in the book, he is bullied by Randy in the book.
- Chad Applewhite - Nate's trusty friend, makes a minor appearance in the book, a member of Nate's Trivia Slam team.
- Dee Dee Holloway - Nate's friend, a member of the doodlers. In the book, she spies in Randy.
- Marty Wright - Nate's somewhat clueless father, who plays golf and is known to make horrible food.
- Gina Hemphill-Toms - Nate's overachiever nemesis. She is the captain of the Trivia Slam team, "Gina's Geniuses".
- Randy Betancourt - One of Nate's other rivals; the school bully. In the book, he bullies Francis.
- Mrs. Clara Godfrey - Nate's ultimate nemesis; his social studies class teacher.
- Mrs. Clarke - Nate's English teacher, hosts the Trivia Slam.
- Mr. Staples - Nate's math teacher, in the book. He describes Nate's homework as the "Mona Lisa of bar graphs".
- Mr. Galvin - Nate's science teacher.
- Ellen Wright - Nate's older sister.
- Nick Blonsky - He makes his first major appearance as the main antagonist, stealing the camera in the book.
- Uncle Pedro - Teddy's uncle who hypnotizes people. He makes his first appearance in this book.

== Reception ==
The whole series was listed 117 times in The New York Times Best Seller list, it included Big Nate: Flips Out, along with a few other books in the series at times.
