= Max & the Midknights (TV series) =

American animated television series

- Genre: Urban fantasy Adventure comedy
- Based on: Max & the Midknights by Lincoln Peirce
- Developed by: Sharon Flynn; David Skelly
- Voices of: Blu del Barrio; Melissa Villaseñor; Zeno Robinson; Caleb Yen; Jeremy Rowley; Gary Anthony Williams; Brian Stepanek; India de Beaufort
- Theme music composer: Matt Mahaffey
- Composer: Matt Mahaffey
- Country of origin: United States
- Original language: English
- No. of seasons: 4
- No. of episodes: 40

Production
- Executive producers: Jane Startz; Lincoln Peirce
- Producer: Amy McKenna
- Production location: Burbank, California
- Running time: 22 minutes
- Production companies: Jane Startz Productions; Nickelodeon Animation Studio

Original release
- Network: Nickelodeon (season 1); Nicktoons (season 2) (Note: "So Slayeth the Prophecy"); TeenNick (seasons 2–4) (Note: "Here Be Dragons" – "The Great Crossover")
- Release: October 30, 2024 – October 23, 2026

Max & the Midknights is an American animated urban fantasy adventure comedy television series developed by Sharon Flynn and David Skelly, based on the book series by Lincoln Peirce. The series premiered on Nickelodeon on October 30, 2024. The first episode of the second season premiered on Nicktoons in September 2025, while the rest of the series premiered on TeenNick in October 2026.

== Premise ==
Set in the fictional city of Byjovia during the Middle Ages, Max & the Midknights follows 10-year-old Max who takes off on a journey with her new friends Millie, Simon, and Kevyn to rescue the kingdom from notorious ruler King Gastley (who had overthrown the previous ruler King Conrad) and the evil sorceress Fendra.

== Characters ==
=== Main ===
- Max (voiced by Blu del Barrio) is a brave and determined girl who longs to be a knight. She is the leader of the Midknights.
- Millie (voiced by Melissa Villaseñor) is a girl with magical powers who is one of the Midknights.
- Simon (voiced by Zeno Robinson) is Millie's brother, who is one of the Midknights.
- Kevyn (voiced by Caleb Yen) is an intelligent bookworm who is one of the Midknights.
- King Gastley (voiced by Brian Stepanek) is the notorious ruler of Byjovia, who stole the throne from his older brother King Conrad.

=== Supporting ===
- Uncle Budrick (voiced by Jeremy Rowley) is a professional troubadour and Max's silly parental figure who begrudgingly became King Gastley's entertainer to protect her.
- Mumblin (voiced by Gary Anthony Williams) is an old wizard that worked for King Conrad who helps the Midknights.
- Fendra (voiced by India de Beaufort) is an evil sorceress who is King Gastley's ally.

== Production ==
Max & the Midknights was conceived by David Skelly and Sharon Flynn. The series was greenlit on November 16, 2021. 20 episodes were ordered for the series, split into two seasons containing ten episodes each. The series is produced by Nickelodeon Animation Studio in Burbank, California. The first two episodes were released on June 9 and July 7, 2024, on YouTube, prior to their respective broadcast premieres.

== Episodes ==
=== Series overview ===
Season	Episodes	Originally released	
Season	Episodes	First released	Last released
1	10	October 30, 2024	January 15, 2025
2	10	September 9, 2025	October 9, 2026
3	10	October 9, 2026	October 19, 2026
4	10	October 19, 2026	October 23, 2026

=== Season 1 (2024–25) ===
No.	Title	Written by	Storyboarded by	Original release date	Prod. code	U.S. viewers (millions)
1	"Welcome to Byjovia"	Sharon Flynn	Jackie Bae, Ingrid Kan, Kimberly Jo Mills & Daniel O'Sullivan	October 30, 2024 (Note: This episode was made available on YouTube on June 9, 2024.)	101	0.08
After accidentally losing their wagon, Max and Uncle Budrick are forced to travel to Budrick's hometown: Byjovia. However, when they arrive, it isn't how Budrick remembered it. Confused by the city's strangeness, they meet Kevyn who, over a small meal, explains how Byjovia became this way. Afterwards, Max sees the mistreatment of Millie and Simon due to being shoeless and attempts to stand up to King Gastley, and in the process, takes off her hat to reveal that she is a girl. She was sentenced to death, but before she was taken away, Budrick stepped in and offered to be Gastley's jester, in exchange for Max's safety. Though, as Budrick was taken away, Gastley ordered the guards to catch Max and the others. She and Kevyn ran away and eventually met up with Millie and Simon again. The four escape pursuit and hid in Kevyn's barn, and Max is now determined to rescue Budrick.
2	"Meet the Midknights"	Sharon Flynn	Jackie Bae, Ingrid Kan, Kimberly Jo Mills & Daniel O'Sullivan	November 6, 2024 (Note: This episode was made available on YouTube on July 7, 2024.)	102	0.09
Max, Millie, and Simon meet Kevyn's ostler father Nolan. When they ask Nolan for help, he takes out a magical coin that can summon a wizard named Mumblin the Magician. Millie excitedly uses the coin to do so. Mumblin explains that he is "rusty" in magic, having retired from the skill due to King Conrad's disappearance and King Gastley outlawing magic. After finding out that everyone in Byjovia is going to a jousting tournament, including Gastley and his guards, the gang think this is the perfect time to storm the castle. Max is unsure and decides to sneak off to rescue Uncle Budrick on her own, though she changes her mind when Millie, Simon, and Kevyn follow her. They all end up participating in the tournament and having to outrun a vicious giant boar. The boar chases them out of the tournament to a dead end, but Mumblin arrives just in time to turn the boar into a bee. He agrees to help the kids rescue Budrick. Outside the castle, Mumblin tries to make a boat to cross the moat but fails, so the kids make their own raft out of barrels. While sailing, a giant squid destroys the raft and attacks the gang, but they escape from it safely and head back to the barn. The kids start thinking up a different plan to rescue Budrick, and they come up with a name for themselves, the "Midknights".
3	"A Midknight Run"	Gavin Laing	Jackie Bae, Andrew Bendik, Ingrid Kan & Patricia Pham	November 13, 2024	103	0.06
4	"Don't Lose Your Head"	Alec Schwimmer	Jackie Bae, Ben Fosselman, Ingrid Kan, Kimberly Jo Mills, Patricia Pham & Prem Sai G.S.	November 20, 2024	104	0.08
5	"Escape from Byjovia"	Lindsay Katai	Jackie Bae, Andrew Bendik, Peter Foltz, Ingrid Kan, Kimberly Jo Mills & Ken Mitchroney	November 27, 2024	105	0.07
6	"For Whom the Troll Tolls"	Sharon Flynn	Andrew Bendik, Patricia Pham & Daniel O'Sullivan	December 4, 2024	106	0.05
7	"The Road Not Taken"	Alec Schwimmer	Jackie Bae, Andrew Bendik, & Prem Sai G.S.	December 11, 2024	107	N/A
8	"The Trail of the Dead"	Gavin Laing	Kat Chan, Peter Foltz, Ingrid Kan, & Ken Mitchroney	January 1, 2025	108	0.08
9	"A Vial of Valor"	Lindsay Katai	Jackie Bae, Andrew Bendik, Kat Chan, Ingrid Kan, Ken Mitchroney, Daniel O'Sullivan, & Patricia Pham	January 8, 2025	109	0.13
10	"An Uphill Battle"	Alec Schwimmer	Jackie Bae, Andrew Bendik, & Prem Sai G.S.	January 15, 2025	110	0.06

=== Season 2 (2025–26) ===
No. overall	No. in series	Title	Written by	Storyboarded by	Original release date	Prod. code	U.S. viewers (millions)
11	1	"So Slayeth the Prophecy"	Sharon Flynn	Peter Holtz, Ingrid Kan, & Ken Mitchroney	September 9, 2025 (Nicktoons)	201	0.05
12	2	"Here Be Dragons"	Gavin Laing	Andrew Capuano, Daniel O'Sullivan, & Patricia Pham	October 5, 2026 (TeenNick)	TBA	N/A
13	3	"Thoroughly Malevolent Millie"	Alec Schwimmer	Jackie Bae, Jane Kim, & Prem Sai G.S.	October 5, 2026 (TeenNick)	TBA	N/A
14	4	"Fens & Enemies"	D.J. Mausner	Ingrid Kan & Ken Mitchroney	October 6, 2026 (TeenNick)	TBA	N/A
15	5	"Dark Knight of the Soul"	Gavin Laing	Andrew Capuano, Daniel O'Sullivan, & Patricia Pham	October 6, 2026 (TeenNick)	TBA	N/A
16	6	"Homeward Bound"	Alec Schwimmer	Jackie Bae, Andrew Bendik, Kat Chan, & Prem Sai G.S.	October 7, 2026 (TeenNick)	TBA	N/A
17	7	"And Joust Like That..."	D.J. Mausner	Peter Foltz, Ingrid Kan, & Ken Mitchroney	October 7, 2026 (TeenNick)	TBA	N/A
18	8	"Before the Storm"	Gavin Laing	Jackie Bae, Peter Foltz, Daniel O'Sullivan, Patricia Pham, & Prem Sai G.S.	October 8, 2026 (TeenNick)	TBA	N/A
19	9	"Battle for Byjovia"	Alec Schwimmer	Jackie Bae, Peter Foltz, Daniel O'Sullivan, Patricia Pham, & Prem Sai G.S.	October 8, 2026 (TeenNick)	TBA	N/A
20	10	"A True Knight's Courage"	Sharon Flynn	Peter Foltz, Ingrid Kan, & Ken Mitchroney	October 9, 2026 (TeenNick)	TBA	N/A

=== Season 3 (2026) ===
No. overall	No. in series	Title	Written by	Storyboarded by	Original release date	Prod. code	U.S. viewers (millions)
21	1	"A Restless Knight"	Sharon Flynn	Peter Foltz & Ingrid Kan	October 9, 2026 (TeenNick)	TBA	N/A
22	2	"A Restless Knight"	Alec Schwimmer	Jackie Bae, Jeongho Lee & Daniel O'Sullivan	October 13, 2026 (TeenNick)	TBA	N/A
23	3	"The Spirit of the Sea"	Gavin Laing	Jackie Bae & Bob Scott	October 13, 2026 (TeenNick)	TBA	TBD
24	4	"The Trial of Mumblin the Magician"	D.J. Mausner	Peter Foltz & Ingrid Kan	October 14, 2026 (TeenNick)	TBA	TBD
25	5	"Honksgiving!"	Sharon Flynn	Jeongho Lee & Daniel O'Sullivan	October 14, 2026 (TeenNick)	TBA	TBD
26	6	"Gnomeward Bound"	Alec Schwimmer	Jackie Bae, Bob Scott & Terrell Turner	October 15, 2026 (TeenNick)	TBA	TBD
27	7	"Stuck in a Hole"	Gavin Laing	Peter Foltz & Ingrid Kan	October 15, 2026 (TeenNick)	TBA	TBD
28	8	"Shale Break"	D.J. Mausner	Jeongho Lee & Daniel O'Sullivan	October 16, 2026 (TeenNick)	TBA	TBD
29	9	"A False Victory"	Alec Schwimmer	Jackie Bae & Bob Scott	October 16, 2026 (TeenNick)	TBA	TBD
30	10	"Tomb of the Bodkin"	Gavin Laing	Peter Foltz & Ingrid Kan	October 19, 2026 (TeenNick)	TBA	TBD

=== Season 4 (2026) ===
No. overall	No. in series	Title	Written by	Storyboarded by	Original release date	Prod. code	U.S. viewers (millions)
31	1	"Odds Bodkins"	N/A	N/A	October 19, 2026 (TeenNick)	TBA	TBD
32	2	"Odds Bodkins"	Alec Schwimmer	Jackie Bae & Bob Scott	October 20, 2026 (TeenNick)	TBA	TBD
33	3	"Into the Shadows"	TBA	TBA	October 20, 2026 (TeenNick)	TBA	TBD
34	4	"Out of the Shadows"	D.J. Mausner	Jeongho Lee, Daniel O'Sullivan & Kimberly Jo Mills	October 21, 2026 (TeenNick)	TBA	TBD
35	5	"Shattered"	Alec Schwimmer	Bob Scott	October 21, 2026 (TeenNick)	TBA	TBD
36	6	"Time Management"	Gavin Laing	Peter Foltz & Ingrid Kan	October 22, 2026 (TeenNick)	TBA	TBD
37	7	"Time After Time"	D.J. Mausner	TBA	October 22, 2026 (TeenNick)	TBA	TBD
38	8	"The Great Crossover"	David Skelly	N/A	October 23, 2026 (TeenNick)	TBA	TBD
39	9	"The Great Crossover"	Gavin Laing & D.J. Mausner	Peter Foltz, Kimberly Jo Mills, Ingrid Kan & Jackie Bae	October 23, 2026 (TeenNick)	TBA	TBD
40	10	"The Great Crossover"	Gavin Laing & D.J. Mausner	Jeongho Lee & Daniel O'Sullivan	October 23, 2026 (TeenNick)	TBA	TBD

== Soundtrack ==
The original soundtrack for the Nickelodeon animated television series Max & the Midknights was released on October 30, 2024 by Republic Records on music platforms, features 14 songs from the show.

Track listing

No.	Title	Writer(s)	Length
1.	"Max & the Midknights Theme Song"	Leticia Wolf	00:39
2.	"Welcome to Byjovia"	Leticia Wolf; Sharon Flynn	01:39
3.	"Somebody's Gotta Do Something"	Leticia Wolf; Matthew Mahaffey	00:46
4.	"Gather Round"	Lincoln Peirce	00:13
5.	"What to Wear"	Alec Schwimmer; Leticia Wolf	01:41
6.	"Eight Arms to Hold You Down"	Leticia Wolf; Matt Mahaffey	02:06
7.	"Flower Welcoming Song"	Alec Schwimmer; Leticia Wolf	01:05
8.	"Don't Say Good-Byjovja"	Alec Schwimmer; Leticia Wolf	00:20
9.	"Sir Gadabout"	Gavin Laing; Leticia Wolf	01:35
10.	"Riding a Dragon"	Leticia Wolf; Matt Mahaffey	01:43
11.	"Nothing But Pigs"	Gavin Laing	00:27
12.	"Get After It"	Leticia Wolf; Matt Mahaffey	01:30
13.	"Go Green"	Leticia Wolf; Matt Mahaffey	02:56
14.	"Mountain Song"	Leticia Wolf	03:05
Total length:			19:38

== Reception ==
=== Critical response ===
Ashley Moulton of Common Sense Media gave the series five-out-of-five stars, stating "this adaptation is a fresh animated show with a winning combination of dynamic characters, positive messages, hilarious jokes, and high-octane music."

=== Awards and nominations ===
Year	Ceremony	Category	Result	Ref.
2025	Kidscreen Awards	Best New Series	Won	
2026	4th Children's and Family Emmy Awards	Outstanding Directing for an Animated Series	Nominated	
2026	4th Children's and Family Emmy Awards	Outstanding Sound Mixing and Sound Editing for an Animated Program	Nominated	
