= Big Nate: Lives It Up =

Book by Lincoln Peirce

Big Nate Lives It Up
- First edition
- Author: Lincoln Peirce
- Cover artist: Lincoln Peirce
- Series: Big Nate (Novels)
- Genre: Fiction
- Published: March 10, 2015, HarperCollins
- Media type: Print (Paperback and Hardcover)
- Pages: 224
- ISBN: 978-0062111128
- Preceded by: Big Nate: In the Zone
- Followed by: Big Nate: Blasts Off

Big Nate Lives It Up is a 2015 book by American cartoonist and animator Lincoln Peirce. It is the successor to Big Nate: In the Zone and the seventh and penultimate book in the Big Nate novel series.

== Plot ==
The book begins with Nate Wright and his friends Francis Pope and Teddy Ortiz attending PS.38’s Breakfast Book Club (or BBC for short). The librarian and book club monitor, Ms. Hickson, shows the kids a century-old journal she found in the school archives, which belonged to a girl named Edna Birkdale. While heading to homeroom, Nate is asked by Principal Nichols to be a “buddy” to a new student and introduce him to PS. 38. Nate is introduced to the student, who is named “Breckenridge Puffington III", whom Nate recognizes, but is still oblivious to the role he played in his life.

During Nate's tour of the school, they run into Randy Betancourt and his posse, who immediately pick on Breckenridge. When Nate goes to protect him, a ceiling tile suddenly falls on his head, prompting some teachers to rush over and Randy’s group to leave. Nate has to visit the school nurse, Ms. Albert, since the ceiling tile that hit his head is made out of hard Styrofoam. Ms. Albert explains that the school is falling apart over the years since it opened a century ago. She also explains that if the school was repaired, there would never be enough money to pay teachers.

During art class, Nate is surprised to learn that Breckenridge considers Nate his best friend, and he tells Francis and Teddy about his suspicious familiarity to him. He also learns of Breckenridge’s passion for drawing flowers. During lunch, he tries to find Breckenridge some friends to hang out with to no avail. When he tries to get some time away from Breckenridge, he finds Ms. Hickson, who gives him a copy of Edna Birkdale’s journal to read. He is initially bored by it, but is excited to learn that she drew cartoons with punch lines like he does.

A few minutes later, just when he and Breckenridge enter gym class, Principal Nichols announces that a gas leak has occurred, and allows the students to have a surprise recess. Nate takes a break from Breckenridge to play football with his friends and a kid named Roderick, but is soon forced by Nichols to be with Breckenridge again, to his dismay.

Over the course of the week, being Breckenridge's buddy begins to exhaust Nate, who still feels like he remembers Breckenridge. The next day back at school, Nate and his friends learn from Nate's dramatic friend Dee Dee that PS. 38 is having a centennial, and it will have a large scavenger hunt. Nate shows Breckenridge the flyer for the celebration and scavenger hunt, and even though Breckenridge is initially uninterested, he decides to join Nate's team. Just as Nate is about to go to BBC, he thinks about leaving Breckenridge again, but a combination of guilt and Principal Nichols spying on him makes him change his mind. During the Breakfast Book Club meeting, everyone reads Edna Birkdale's journal (except for Breckenridge, who is reading a plant book as the journal wasn't appealing to him), with one note from the journal in particular standing out. It says there was a mural in the school's old south stairwell, which Ms. Hickson theorizes was destroyed over the years. Nate's nemesis Gina criticizes the meeting once it's over, calling comics "lame", with particularly strong criticism directed at Nate since he has a passion for them. Nate realizes that he himself was criticizing Breckenridge’s love for plants and criticizing him for loving it. With that, Nate starts to be more accepting of Breckenridge.

During the Doodlers' meeting, Breckenridge shows interest in a painting of flowers made by an artist named Granny Peppers. The gang also expresses curiousness for Granny Peppers' paintings, the fact being that one was sold for $2,000,000. While on the way home, Breckenridge mentiones a nickname he had when he was younger, Bobby. At this, Nate immediately recognizes the name AND Breckenridge. As it turns out, when Nate was in preschool, a kid named Bobby used to pick on him for months. This "Bobby" person was none other than Breckenridge. Upon realizing as much, Nate snaps at Breckenridge and walks off.

When Nate gets home, he is visited by Dee Dee, who wants to know what just happened. As Nate explains everything, Dee Dee asks Nate to forgive Breckenridge. When he is unsure, Dee Dee invites Breckenridge into Nate's room. Nate tells Breckenridge that the reason he didn't connect with him was that they have little in common, but befriends him after Dee Dee points out that she likes cats, figure skating, and egg salad, things Nate despises very much, yet he's still friends with her.

Now officially considering Breckenridge a friend, Nate includes him in his scavenger hunt team. During the day of the centennial, 5 teams, including Nate's and Gina's, are instructed to find 12 items relating to the school's history, with the final item being something that will improve PS. 38. They search the school's storage room for something, but find nothing until Breckenridge finds a wall with flowers painted over. Nate realizes that the flowers might be part of the mural described by Edna Birkdale, as the storage room could be in place of the former south stairwell from the school's original design. Furthermore, Breckenridge deduces that it was painted by Granny Peppers, since the flowers were painted the same as the painting in the art room. With this information, Nate rushes to find Principal Nichols and asks him to follow him to witness the mural in the story.

Breckenridge's theory ends up correct, with Nate, Principal Nichols, and the rest of the gang live on TV, interviewed on how they found the long-lost mural. After interviewing Breckenridge, the reporter asks Nichols what made the mural's discovery so significant. Nichols then reveals that the mural was Granny Pepper's only mural. Due to its significance and rarity, PS. 38 is donating it to a museum, who will be offering money to restore the PS.38 building. The gang go to see the mural, which is exactly how Edna said it was 100 years ago. And thus, because of Breckenridge, Nate's team won the scavenger hunt, with the prize revealed to be a hot air balloon ride. However, Breckenridge declines the ride because he suffers from acrophobia, which Nate accepts.

== Characters ==
- Nate Wright: a rebellious 6th-grader and the main protagonist.
- Dee Dee Holloway: a friend of Nate and one of Nate’s good friends.
- Chad Applewhite: a friend of Nate and one of Nate’s good friends.
- Teddy Ortiz: a best friend of Nate.
- Artur Pashkov: the singer of ETM and Jenny's exchange student boyfriend.
- Francis Pope: Nate's best friend.
- Jenny Jenkins: Artur's girlfriend and the girl whom Nate has a crush on, though she finds Nate to be completely annoying and bothering.
- Breckenridge Puffington III: Nate's new best friend and his buddy at the start of this book. His grandmother calls him Bobby, and he used to bully Nate in preschool. Nate and his friends nicknamed him B-Dawg. He makes his first appearance in this book and appears as a minor character in Big Nate: Blasts Off. He loves plants and wants to become a botanist when he grows up.
