= Big Nate Goes for Broke =

Book by Lincoln Peirce

- Author: Lincoln Peirce
- Illustrator: Lincoln Peirce
- Language: English
- Series: Big Nate
- Genre: Comedy; Fictional; Children's novel Comic strip
- Publisher: HarperCollins Publishers
- Publication date: March 20, 2012
- Publication place: United States
- Media type: Print (Hardcover)
- Pages: 224
- ISBN: 9780061996627
- Preceded by: Big Nate: On a Roll
- Followed by: Big Nate: Flips Out

Big Nate Goes for Broke is a New York Times Bestselling realistic fiction novel by American cartoonist Lincoln Peirce, based on the Big Nate comic strip. It is the fourth book in the Big Nate series, followed by Big Nate: Flips Out, released on March 20, 2012. It is aimed at children aged 8–12. It was published by HarperCollins Publishers.

== Plot ==
Nate Wright has started a cartooning club at his school, and at the club, a teacher from rival school Jefferson shows her art club's art to Nate and his friends, who are enraged at how good the Jefferson students are at drawing. Later, Mr. Rosa suggests that the club should include more girls and Nate believes they should invite his crush Jenny, to which the others immediately scoff at. Francis proposes they invite Dee Dee, a talkative girl known for being incredibly dramatic and constantly dressing up in costumes, due to her being a good artist. Nate tries to ask Dee Dee to join the club, but accidentally asks her to the school dance instead. Nate is relieved when Dee Dee clarifies that they are just friends, but then a leak springs during the dance, causing everyone to evacuate the school.

The school is closed and the kids are sent to Jefferson. Nate breaks his wrist in the process of helping his friend Chad, who is being bullied. Nate finds he cannot draw because of his broken wrist. He originally had plans to submit a Dr Cesspool comic strip to a contest, but is now unable to since it is not finished. Dee Dee volunteers to finish it for him, though Nate is very reluctant. At one point, Nate proclaims that Jefferson is unbeatable, Dee Dee contests this opinion, saying "everyone has an Achilles' heel". Nate later learns that the phrase means a weakness that can be exploited and completely derail a person. A basketball game comes, and the Bobcats (the team from Nate's school) lose.

Nate vows to beat Jefferson and decides to have a snow sculpture contest called a "snowdown". Jefferson used an old cavalier and packed snow around it, whereas the Bobcats made a snow statue of Achilles with an arrow in his heel (in reference to Dee Dee's remark). As a result, the Bobcats win due to their creativity. Nate and friends return to P.S. 38, still celebrating their win. They win against Jefferson again when the comic Nate and Dee Dee made is published in the comic contest and only beaten by high school students. In the end, Nate says that the breaking of his wrist was lucky.

== Reception ==
Critical reception for Big Nate Goes for Broke has been positive. The Horn Book Guide rated the book favorably, stating "Nate's enthusiastic nature, his amusing mishaps, and Peirce's inviting comic style will keep fans happy." Common Sense Media gave the book three out of five stars, writing "Creative underdogs win big in fun comic novel."
