= Teacher's pet =

Student especially favored by a teacher

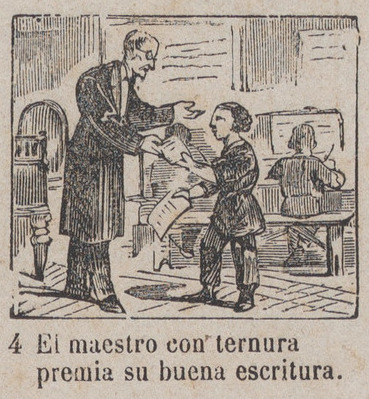
A Spanish broadside from 1864 shows how "the teacher tenderly rewards [the good student's] good writing."

A teacher's pet is a student who is viewed most favorably by their teacher in a school. They can be viewed unsympathetically by other students due to jealousy or envy in certain situations. The phenomenon is extensively acknowledged by the public, but actual research on the topic is very limited. Various cognitive biases may influence a teacher's judgment of their students, such as gender, ethnicity, physical appearance, and other characteristics. In classrooms with teacher's pets, negative opinion of the teacher by students is more prevalent.
