= Big Nate: On a Roll =

Children's novel by Lincoln Peirce

- Author: Lincoln Peirce
- Illustrator: Lincoln Peirce
- Language: English
- Series: Big Nate
- Genre: Comedy; Fictional; Children's novel Comic strip
- Publisher: HarperCollins Publishers
- Publication date: August 16, 2011
- Publication place: United States
- Media type: Print (Hardcover)
- Pages: 224
- ISBN: 9780061944390
- Preceded by: Big Nate: Strikes Again
- Followed by: Big Nate: Goes for Broke

Big Nate: On a Roll is a fiction novel by American cartoonist Lincoln Peirce, based on the comic strip Big Nate. It is the third book in the Big Nate novel series, followed by Big Nate Goes for Broke, released on August 16, 2011. It is aimed at children aged 8 to 12. It was published by HarperCollins Publishers in New York City.

== Plot ==
Nate Wright was asked by Mr. Rosa to hold a ladder for his rival Artur, so that he can paint the scenery for the school play. Artur drips paint on Nate who accidentally causes Artur to fall on him, resulting in Mr. Rosa getting mad at Nate and giving him detention. When detention is over, Nate tries to get to his Timber scout troop meeting on his skateboard, but on his way, he accidentally crashes into a woman's poodle's stretched leash, causing his skateboard to roll off the bridge and into the oily water of Beard’s Creek below. This results in Nate having to walk, causing him to miss the meeting.

Nate's best friends Francis and Teddy tell him that Artur has joined their scout troop, much to Nate's horror. As Nate and Francis are walking home, Francis talks to Nate about the fundraiser where they have to sell Warm Fuzzies, wall hangings with little statements underneath, as they need money for their camping gear. When Nate finds out that the grand prize is a new skateboard, he becomes motivated to sell Warm Fuzzies.

The next day, Nate meets Teddy and Francis at his mailbox, where Francis tells Nate that Artur's his competition. At school, Nate sees Artur and Gina sucking up to the teachers, and Nate says that they're made for each other, which gives Nate the idea to make a plan to have Gina and Artur fall for one another so he can go after Jenny, Artur’s current girlfriend, who Nate has had a crush on since Kindergarten.

Later, during the last period of school, Science, his mind wanders to the prize skateboard and he starts doodling in his notebook. Gina peers over his shoulder and tells Mr. Galvin that Nate was drawing. Mr. Galvin lets Nate off the hook, as Mr. Galvin was a Timber scout when he was Nate's age. After school, Nate makes his first attempt to get Artur to like Gina, then gets a head-start selling wall hangings. After a couple of hours of trying to sell wall-hangings he has managed to sell five. When Nate gets home, he is shocked to find Artur in his uniform talking to his dad, Martin, and even more shocked to find out that Artur has sold twenty wall hangings.

Nate's excited to see the opening night of the Peter Pan play put on by the Drama Club. At intermission, they walk out of the theater to get some snacks, but Nate is shocked when he sees Artur selling the wall-hangings to theater-goers, something Nate never thought of doing. When Nate gets home, he tries to sell some wall hangings to his big sister Ellen, but it backfires, though she unknowingly gives Nate an idea which is him earning money by doing basic jobs, and then using it all to buy wall hangings, instead of selling wall hangings.

The next morning on Saturday, he finds Mr. Eustis with a sprained knee, and he needs help to walk his pet dog Spitsy while he recovers. Nate takes the job, and due to Spitsy's unpredictable movements, decides to tie Spitsy's leash to his belt. Spitsy sees Pickles, Francis's cat whom he has a crush on, and dashes for her, leaving Nate out of control and smashing his face on a tree, getting a black eye and some bruises. He eventually finds Spitsy with Pickles, but when his dad sees Nate's injuries, he drives him to the emergency room. His doctor says to Nate's dad for Nate to rest for the day. Nate wakes up early the next morning to let people in his neighborhood know about his business by making little cards and drawing little pictures of him doing work and sticking them in almost everyone's property around the neighborhood. He gets lots of jobs and earns almost 50 dollars, but he has a job that involved moving lawn gnomes to their name signs that ends with him accidentally breaking one of the lawn gnomes and not raising any money for that job.

On Monday morning, Nate finds hope to raise more money as he sees The Math Olympiad roster, and Artur is on the list, and Nate later finds out that the Math Olympiad lasts for 2 days on the next weekend, which gives him plenty of time to catch up to Artur. Then after that, Nate tries to trick Artur into falling in love with Gina who is also on the roster too. He walks into Social Studies class now, but when he is getting to his desk, Mrs. Godfrey screams at him for his mediocre homework and tells Nate to rewrite it without the cartoons. That suddenly gives Nate an idea to sell cartoons rather than sell wall hangings. After school, he quickly gets home and puts together "Nate's Comix Crack Up", a compilation of comics written by Nate. Then he makes 20 copies of the comic, which cost almost all the money he got over the weekend.

He then goes to the mall to ask Ellen's boyfriend Gordie, who runs a comic book shop, if he wants to sell a copy of his comic book. Gordie accepts the offer to put it on display, but he has to get his boss's okay to do that. Meanwhile, Nate finds a guy who is putting comic books in his bag and mistakes him for a shoplifter, for he is actually Gordie's boss. This ends up with Gordie buying one copy but telling Nate he should sell the other copies somewhere else. Nate finds some potential customers, but they all say no, and when Nate reads one of the comics to one of them, they state that his comics aren't funny. Nate then gets an idea to speak on the intercom, which attracts only the mall cop who chews out Nate, and then his dad hears the news and grounds him for a week.

After Nate's grounding, his dad says that Nate is no longer grounded, but is provided to make it through school with no incidents. Nate quickly goes to school, but later finds out that the school is laughing out loud to a rumor that Nate likes Gina. He finds out later that Artur thought that Nate wanted Gina for himself and went to tell people. He is also shocked to find out that Artur made 424 dollars in selling wall hangings, via an order form. He gets to class and give Artur his order form, then ends the rumors of Nate liking Gina. He has some really close calls during some periods, but he made it through school without no incidents. He then studies what money he got from every job he did, and he is still far behind Artur.

Nate meets up with Gordie, who is reading a price guide which lists the cash of collectible comic books and Nate is surprised to see the price guide on one of the comics which he remembered that to be a comic he bought at a yard sale last fall that thought was worthless but turned out to be a collector’s item. He found the book in his closet and sold it to Gordie. At the Timber scout jamboree, the scoutmaster announces the prize winners. When he gets to the first prize, he announces that both Nate and Artur have sold 58 wall hangings. The scoutmaster does a coin flip to determine who will be the winner. Nate wins and receives the skateboard, and Artur wins the telescope, Artur invites Nate's friends to watch him set up his telescope, but Nate puts on his skateboard gear and in response, begins to ride his new skateboard to Artur's house.

== Characters ==
These characters appear in the book:

- Nate Wright - The main protagonist, a boy who believes he is destined for greatness. He is constantly getting detention for standing up to Mrs. Godfrey, a teacher who Nate thinks “is out to get him.” He likes to draw comics featuring him as a superhero and has a crush on a girl named Jenny.
- Francis Pope - Nate's highly intelligent best friend.
- Teddy Ortiz - Nate's comedic best friend who sometimes gets in trouble in Nate's antics.
- Ellen Wright - Nate's older sister, a girly and boy-crazy teen who annoys Nate.
- Gordie - Ellen's boyfriend. He works at the comics store, Klassic Komix, where Nate tried to sell his comic book, Nate's Komix Krack-Up, but was unsuccessful.
- Don Eustis - Nate's middle-aged bachelor neighbour, who owns the idiotic and pathetic dog, Spitsy. In the book, he plays a minor role; asking Nate to walk Spitsy.
- Spitsy - The moronic and pathetic pet dog of Nate's next-door neighbour, Mr. Eustis. In the book, like his owner, he plays a minor role, where Nate agrees to walk him, causing him serious pain.
- Jenny Jenkins - Nate's crush and Artur's girlfriend. She thinks Nate is annoying but loves Artur, and sometimes hits Nate when he tries to flirt with her.
- Gina Hemphill-Toms - Nate's other nemesis who has a very high IQ and brags about it. Nate and Gina hate each other and they are both mad when Artur says that Nate has a crush on Gina.

== Reception ==
School Library Journal praised the book that the main character Nate "delivers what fans come to expect", and Kirkus Reviews called the book the "slickest of the series". As of September 2020, 95% of google users liked the book. A critic from Common Sense Media said that it was "sure to entice reluctant readers with its funny blend of misadventures and comic-style art."
