= Big Nate =

American comic strip by Lincoln Peirce

- Author: Lincoln Peirce
- Illustrator: Lincoln Peirce
- Website: Official GoComics page
- Current status/schedule: Sundays-only; daily until June 13, 2026
- Launch date: January 7, 1991
- Syndicate: Newspaper Enterprise Association
- Genre(s): Humor, school life, readable

Big Nate (stylized as big NATE in the comic collections and BiG NATE in the books) is an American comic strip written and illustrated by Lincoln Peirce, syndicated since January 7, 1991. The strip ran daily from January 7, 1991 until June 13, 2026, and now runs Sundays-only. The strip follows sixth-grader Nate Wright, alongside his family, friends, and foes.

The strip's success led to a media franchise, consisting of two series of children's books by Lincoln Peirce – the eponymous novel series and the Little Big Nate board books – a video game hosted on Poptropica since 2009, and an animated television series, which premiered on Paramount+ in 2022.

== Synopsis ==
Big Nate follows the adventures and misadventures of Nate Wright, an incompetent, spirited, and rebellious sixth-grader. He has three best friends (Francis, Teddy, and Dee Dee) who occasionally get in trouble with him. Other characters include a variety of teachers and students at Nate’s school, Public School 38. Nate hates social studies teacher Mrs. Godfrey, whom he considers his nemesis, and calls her names like “the school's Godzilla”, usually centered around her weight. He has a love-hate relationship with Artur, a foreign exchange student, because Artur is dating Jenny, Nate’s crush. Nate also loathes Gina, a “teacher’s pet” who gets good grades and is constantly acting like a suck-up to Mrs. Godfrey. Peirce occasionally focuses on Nate's home life with his single father, Martin, and girly sister Ellen.

Answering questions from fans in The Washington Post, Peirce revealed the following about the creation of the strip:

Big Nate started as more of a "domestic humor" strip than it is now. It was my intention to feature a lot of stories about Nate's single dad, and all the comic possibilities inherent in that. But before too long, I realized that the part of the strip that I enjoyed most was the school humor. I'd been a teacher myself, and schools can be very funny places.

— Lincoln Peirce

== Characters ==
- Nate Wright: The comic strip's main character. Nate is a C-grade student in sixth grade and 11-and-a-half years old, a talented cartoonist, drummer, and chess player. He also believes he is a natural prankster, as he attempts funny and difficult pranks on the second to last day of school (known in the series as "Prank Day"). He is somewhat vain, believing himself to be irresistible to girls despite being rejected repeatedly by his crush, Jenny Jenkins, a brilliant sports player despite his lack of athletic abilities, and a genius despite his below-average grades. Nate spends much of his time in detention, in the art room drawing comics, or playing drums for his rock band, Enslave the Mollusk, which also comprises his friends Francis, Teddy, and Artur. Nate is desperate to own a dog, in part due to his ailurophobia, but rarely gets his wish, as his father does not want to own a dog. He also hates figure skating and egg salad, but loves Cheez Doodles. Surprisingly, Nate's most well-known talent is that he is a skilled chess player, to the complete confusion of his friends and family. Nate is also known for having a very accurate sense of smell, which can outdo a dog's. He also happens to not have a middle name.
- Martin Earl "Marty" Wright: Nate's father, a bald, overweight divorcé who lost his job in the eighth novel of the series (but eventually getting another one in town). Like his son, he is somewhat clueless about his failings and considers himself a professional musician despite his indescribably poor singing voice and initially poor steel-string guitar playing, an athlete despite his inherent laziness, and an expert golfer, though he constantly cheats or loses his ball. He is a health nut and always tries to hand out healthy alternatives to candy on Halloween (raisins, prunes, trail mix, etc.), which is probably so he can increase the chance of eating the candy which is always rejected by trick-or-treaters. He also was the hero of the first Mud Bowl, according to Big Nate: Blasts Off. His first name was first stated in a comic strip dating to July 28, 2005. Martin's ex-wife lives "two thousand miles away" and Nate has very little contact with her and does not remember much.
- Ellen Wright: Nate's fifteen-year-old sister who is older by four years. Unlike Nate, Ellen is responsible and hardworking and loves cats and figure-skating, and egg salad. Nate is always compared to Ellen in school by teachers, especially Mrs. Godfrey. She is Nate's consistent rival, and he enjoys playing pranks on her. Ellen also dates Gordie on and off, who works at the comic book store, Klassic Komix, and has previously dated Kenny Smithson, the captain of the football team, and is considered her crush. They briefly broke up before reconciling.
- Francis Butthurst Pope: Nate's #1 friend, Francis is very intelligent, and this upsets his friends from time to time, mostly as he enjoys reading facts. He has a gap between his teeth and lets people bully him often. Nate and Francis frequently make fun of each other, but he states that this is how they operate. He also likes to read ‘The Book of Facts’ which annoys Nate and Teddy. Nate and Francis often argue about cats vs dogs as Francis is a cat person, he also has a cat named Pickles. Contrary to Nate's feelings for them, Francis is friendly with both Mrs. Godfrey and Artur. Francis plays the electric guitar in Enslave the Mollusk and dates Gina Hemphill-Toms.
- Teddy Ortiz: Nate's number "1A" best friend, Teddy is a comedic character who frequently cracks jokes and annoys Nate. Like Francis, Teddy is a member of Enslave the Mollusk, in which he plays the musical keyboard. His middle name is the square root symbol since his parents are math teachers. In Big Nate: Flips Out, it is revealed that he is fluent in Spanish. In a comic strip published in 1994, it is revealed that Teddy is half Mexican, and half Puerto Rican.
- Spitsy: Spitsy is Mr. Eustis' dog. Nate has always wanted a dog for Christmas but has never got one, so Spitsy is the closest thing he has to his own dog. Spitsy wears a cone and a dog sweater.

== Recurring premises ==
=== Enslave the Mollusk ===
Enslave the Mollusk (ETM) is a garage band featured in Big Nate. It features Nate as backing vocalist and drummer, with his best friends Francis on electric guitar and Teddy on keyboard, as well as Artur as lead vocalist. Chad is the band's roadie. Enslave the Mollusk had a big role in Big Nate the Musical. They performed 3 times: twice during the In The Zone novel when P.S. 38 was starting a fitness zone but the first time Artur wasn't there because he quit the band, but eventually rejoined by their last performance, and also at one of the school dances. They tried to perform at another school dance but failed because of a power outage. Nate was originally lead singer as he formed the band but wasn't good enough, which was realized after Artur passed by the band playing one day. Artur then sang a rendition of "I Fought The Law" and was hired as the band's lead singer. He quit in the middle of Big Nate: In The Zone after he found a slip of paper with rude nicknames for him that Nate wrote, but was enticed back by the end of the book. The band is named "Fear the Mollusk" in the TV series.

=== Femme Fatality ===
Femme Fatality is Nate's favorite super-hero comic. The images are never shown, but there were a few appearances of the eponymous character, as a life-size cardboard cut-out in a 2002 comic and as a cosplay actor visiting Klassic Komix in 2004. The character is highly suggestive, judging from the reaction of Nate and most of the other male characters (including adults), and often mentioned to be wearing skimpy and revealing clothing. Some of the girls show exasperation over Nate's obsession with the comic, but Nate insists he reads it only for the stories. One of Nate's previous comic book crushes was Red Sonja. Femme Fatality later inspired Nate to create his own super-hero comic called "Eve of Destruction", though he later changed the character to male, and called the comic "Steve of Destruction".

=== P.S. 38 ===
Public School 38 is the middle school Nate and his friends attend and is where most of the comics take place. The school is noted to be over 100 years old and is considerably run down, but was remodeled in Big Nate: Lives It Up after a painting by local folk artist Granny Peppers was found to be worth a lot of money.

=== Jefferson Middle School ===
Jefferson Middle School is a middle school near P.S. 38 and is the school's sister institution. In stark contrast to P.S. 38, Jefferson is portrayed as a large modern building with numerous 21st century features. It has been described as "more of a museum than a school." The middle school's kids are the rivals of P.S. 38's kids and beat them in almost everything. Most Jefferson kids are always obnoxious about this. P.S. 38 beat Jefferson in the 'Ultimate Snowdown', the 1st and 38th 'Mud Bowl', and their big 2008 soccer game. Jefferson lost the Snowdown because they took an uncreative approach by packing snow around the spare knight statue. They are also P.S. 38's unofficial rival, as none of the teachers treat each other as rivals.

== Bibliography ==
Forty-four print collections and novel books, as well as six activity books, have been published.

=== Book series ===
1. Big Nate: In a Class by Himself – March 23, 2010
2. Big Nate: Strikes Again – October 19, 2010
3. Big Nate: On a Roll – August 16, 2011
4. Big Nate: Goes for Broke – March 20, 2012
5. Big Nate: Flips Out – February 5, 2013
6. Big Nate: In the Zone – March 11, 2014
7. Big Nate: Lives It Up – March 10, 2015
8. Big Nate: Blasts Off – February 16, 2016

=== Activity books ===
1. Big Nate Boredom Buster: Super Scribbles, Cool Comix, and Lots of Laughs (April 12, 2011)
2. Big Nate Fun Blaster: Cheezy Doodles, Crazy Comix and Loads of Laughs (July 10, 2012)
3. Big Nate Doodlepalooza: Scribble Games, Secret Codes, and Nonstop Laughs (July 9, 2013)
4. Big Nate Laugh-O-Rama: Daring Drawings, Maze Madness, and Tons of Fun (July 8, 2014)
5. Big Nate Super Scribbler: Cheezy Doodles, Crazy Comix, and Epic Laughs (July 7, 2015)
6. Big Nate Puzzlemania: Super Scribbles, Goofy Games, and Tons of Fun (May 17, 2016)

=== Board books ===
1. Little Big Nate Draws a Blank - September 3, 2019
2. Little Big Nate: No Nap! - September 1, 2020

== Other media ==
=== Video game ===
Since February 12, 2009, the online role-playing video game Poptropica by Jeff Kinney has featured a "Big Nate Island" as one of the game's "islands", in which the player must problem-solve through game quest scenarios, centering on a problem that the player must resolve by going through multiple obstacles, collecting and using items, talking to various characters, and completing goals, written and illustrated by a returning Lincoln Peirce.

=== Musical ===
In May 2013, a stage musical adaptation of the comic strip debuted at the Adventure Theatre MTC in Maryland. The production's story centers on Nate, who tries to enter his school's Battle of the Bands competition but must try to avoid getting any more detentions, as too many would disqualify his band from competing. Critical reception for the musical has been positive.

=== Television series adaptation ===
On February 19, 2020, it was announced that Big Nate would receive a 26-episode animated TV adaptation, which was slated to air on Nickelodeon in September 2021 but was delayed to 2022. In December 2021, the voice cast was announced, as was that the series would instead be for Paramount+. It would eventually air on Nickelodeon on September 5, 2022.
