= Big Nate: Blasts Off =

Book by Lincoln Peirce

- First edition
- Author: Lincoln Peirce
- Cover artist: Lincoln Peirce
- Series: Big Nate (Novels)
- Genre: Fiction
- Publication date: February 16, 2016
- Media type: Print (Paperback and Hardcover and Ebook)
- Pages: 225
- ISBN: 978-0062111128
- Preceded by: Big Nate: Lives It Up

Big Nate Blasts Off is a 2016 book written by Lincoln Peirce, which is the successor to Big Nate Lives It Up. It is the final book in the novel series; however, comic book compilations and weekly comics are still released.

== Plot ==
Mrs. Godfrey, Nate's social studies teacher, makes a new seating chart, placing Nate in front of Ruby Dinsmore instead of his rival Gina. This makes Nate excited for social studies (contrary to his original belief that it was terrible) because he shows affection for Ruby. Nate plans to check his homework with Ruby, but he discovers an old comic that Ruby insists on reading. However, Mrs. Godfrey catches Nate with it and sends him to detention, as the comic depicted Mrs. Godfrey as a villain reminiscent to Godzilla.

After detention, Nate and his friends practice for a game called the "Mud Bowl" and has a run-in with Randy Betancourt, but Ruby suddenly intervenes, making Randy back out. On the way to Nate's house, Dee Dee tells Francis and Teddy that Nate has a crush on Ruby (whilst also noting that Randy has a crush on Ruby). In Nate's home, Teddy tells Nate's dad that they are going to practice for the Mud Bowl, who tells them that he invented it and won the first one against Jefferson. The next day at school, Dee Dee tells Nate that she "accidentally" told her friends that Nate has a crush on Ruby. The whole school finds out and Randy bullies Nate.

At lunchtime, Nate gets hired to write a column in the school paper; he ends up writing a gossip column about kids at school. Nate's dad packs Nate another disgusting lunch, and no one is willing to trade lunches with him. Ruby feels bad for Nate and gives Nate her root beer. Nate opens the can, not knowing that beforehand Randy shook up the can, and gets sprayed with root beer getting humiliated in the process. Dee Dee tells Nate that Randy shook the can before Ruby gave it to Nate and that she couldn't tell Ruby because a teacher didn't allow her. Nate clashes with Randy in the boys' bathroom, and Principal Nichols enters the boys' bathroom and sees the confrontation between the two. Nate is not sent to detention, but the principal states that he will get other means of discipline if he continues to "pick on" Randy.

Nate goes home while his dad goes to work in a suit, which is suspicious, as his dad never wears suits. At school, Nate writes an insulting column about Randy for revenge and Randy attacks him in the halls, leading to a fight. Principal Nichols sends the boys to Peer Counseling with Gina; because of this, Nate won't be able to practice for the Mud Bowl with his friends and Ruby, who just joined his team.

When Nate goes home, Nate's dad tells Nate and his sister that he lost his job a month ago and that the family might have to move to California because a company wants to hire him there. Nate goes outside and meets his friends and learns from Dee Dee that Ruby likes him; however, because he is moving to California, Nate tells his friends that he is not interested in starting a relationship with Ruby (which he later reveals he lied about), much to his friends' dismay.

A week later, Nate still has not told anyone that he might be moving to California, and he goes on a field trip to a science museum and gets paired with Randy to do an assignment. Nate encounters Nolan, an obnoxious Jefferson student who Nate knew long ago, and they fight about the Mud Bowl. To Nate's shock, Randy intervenes in the fight, and when Nolan is gone the two boys talk about Nate moving away and Randy's parents divorcing. After the field trip, Nate and his friends practice for the Mud Bowl and Nate asks Randy to join the team because he has just seen Randy has a really good throw. After a while, Dee Dee pulls Nate over and asks why he pretends to not like Ruby. Before Nate can give an explanation, Nate's dad arrives and tells Nate that he got another job where they live and that they don't have to move to California. Nate tells the news to his friends and an excited Ruby kisses Nate. Seeing this, Randy gets upset and Nate speaks with him, who reminds Randy that they are teammates and plan to talk strategy.

Two days later, the Mud Bowl begins, which is not always the same day and is played when bad weather starts. At first, Nolan's team is in the lead until Francis changes positions, and they start scoring. Nate notices that because of his crush on Ruby, Randy throws it to her a lot, causing Jefferson's team to notice a pattern and take the frisbee from them whenever Randy throws it. Nate calls a time out between him and Randy, and with some words from him, Randy accepts that Ruby likes Nate. Nate's team comes up with a plan to win and ties Jefferson in a tie game of 19-19. Nate manages to catch the frisbee as time runs out, breaking their 37th-year losing streak. A week later, Nate and his team read the school paper, the headline being "Betancourt & Wright team up to win first "Mup" Bowl in 37 years" as they head to social studies. Nate tells his friends that he retired from "Bugle Blasts", saying that he is not that kind of person. He shows his friends another comic making fun of Mrs. Godfrey.

== Reception ==
The book was critically well received, with many fans and critics saying that it was the sendoff the series needed. Darienne Stewart of Common Sense Media called the book a "Warmhearted ending for popular comic series", while the book got a 4.9/5 on DOGO Books.
