= Lincoln Peirce =

American cartoonist (born 1963)

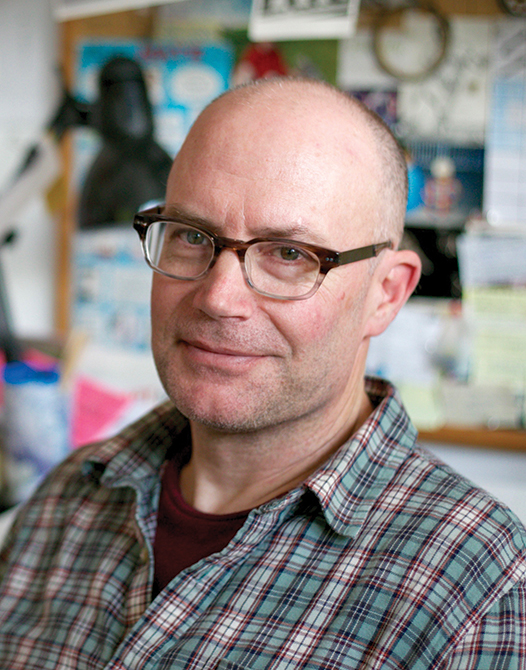
- Peirce in 2019
- Born: October 23, 1963 (age 62); Ames, Iowa, U.S.
- Education: Colby College (BA); Brooklyn College (MFA)
- Occupations: Cartoonist, animator, writer
- Known for: Big Nate comic strip (1991–present)
- Spouse: Jessica Gandolf

Lincoln Jeffrey Peirce (pronounced "purse", born October 23, 1963) is an American cartoonist, animator and author best known as the creator of the successful Big Nate comic strip and as the author/illustrator of a series of Big Nate novels for young readers. He has also written a number of animated shorts that have appeared on Cartoon Network and Nickelodeon. Peirce is the creator of the animated series based on his aforementioned book and comic strip series. The series premiered on the Paramount+ streaming service.

== Early life ==
Peirce was born on October 23, 1963, in the city of Ames, Iowa. He is of French descent. His family moved east in 1964, and Peirce grew up in Durham, New Hampshire. He developed a fascination with comic strips at a young age and often cites Charles Schulz's Peanuts as his greatest inspiration. At Colby College in Waterville, Maine, he studied art and art history. During his four years at Colby, he produced a weekly comic strip called Third Floor, featuring an ensemble cast of student and faculty characters. From 1985 to 1987, he studied at Brooklyn College in New York, where he earned an MFA in studio art. He attended the Skowhegan School of Painting and Sculpture, and then worked for three years at Xavier High School in New York City, where he was an art teacher and baseball coach.

In the early 1990s, Peirce relocated to Portland, Maine with his wife, Jessica Gandolf (an artist), in an effort to be closer to family and his preferred sports teams.

== Career ==
Peirce is the creator of the comic strip Big Nate. The strip debuted in 1991 in 135 newspapers, and currently has a client list of over 400 newspapers worldwide. Big Nate is also available online at gocomics.com, where in 2019 it was the site's second most-viewed feature, ranking behind only Calvin & Hobbes. The popular children's website poptropica.com has included Big Nate since 2009. In 2010, Peirce wrote the first of eight Big Nate novels for young readers. Published by HarperCollins, each book in the series was a New York Times bestseller. In 2011, Andrews McMeel Publishing began a series of Big Nate compilations. The series consists of 22 books to date and every one of them has been on the New York Times bestseller list. Under the AMP! Comics for Kids imprint, 20 collections have been released. Epic Big Nate, a coffee table book celebrating the strip's first 25 years, was published in 2016. Big Nate books appear in 33 different languages and have sold over 20 million copies. He is good friends with book author Jeff Kinney.

Peirce has also written for television, contributing to Cartoon Network's shorts program and Nickelodeon's Random! Cartoons. He created two Uncle Gus stories ("For the Love of Monkeys" and "Not So Fast") for Cartoon Network, and later wrote a series of 2-minute shorts called The Brothers Pistov for the short-lived series Sunday Pants. At Nickelodeon, Peirce wrote and storyboarded "Super John Doe Junior," about the son of a beloved crime-fighter who has inherited none of his father's super powers.

=== Big Nate ===
Big Nate debuted in newspapers on January 6, 1991. The strip's main character is Nate Wright, an irrepressible sixth grader with a naïve and inflated sense of his own greatness, and a powerful resentment for his social studies teacher, Mrs. Godfrey. Some characters include Nate's friends, Teddy Ortiz and Francis Pope. Teddy has a sense of humor recognized by characters in the book and has musical interests playing the keyboard for Nate's band, Enslave the Mollusk. Francis on the other hand, is highly intelligent, and plays the electric guitar for the band. About the series' original intentions, Peirce has said that Big Nate, which featured only six characters when it started, originated as a "domestic humor" strip, and that he intended to focus on Nate's family life. Soon, however, Peirce realized that "the gags I enjoyed writing most were the school jokes. Nate's life in middle school was where all the funny stuff was happening." Nate's school, P.S. 38, became the narrative center of the strip, and Peirce has added dozens of characters to the cast of classmates and teachers during the strip's run.

In May 2013, Big Nate: the Musical had its world premiere at Adventure Theatre MTC in Glen Echo, Maryland. The music was written by Christopher Youstra, with lyrics by Christopher Youstra and Jason Loewith.

On February 19, 2020, a Big Nate animated series was announced to be greenlit, with Peirce serving as a consultant, beginning with the 26-episode Season 1. Originally planned to premiere on Nickelodeon, and developed by Mitch Watson, the series instead debuted on February 17, 2022, on the Paramount+ streaming service. The series eventually premiered on Nickelodeon on September 5, 2022.

On April 19, 2026, Peirce announced that the final Big Nate daily strip would be published on June 13, 2026, with Sunday strips continuing afterwards.

=== Max & the Midknights ===
After completing the Big Nate novel series in 2016, Peirce began work on Max & the Midknights, a comedic adventure story set in the Middle Ages. It is the first in a three-book series published by Penguin Random House. Max & the Midknights was published on January 8, 2019, and went on to spend sixteen weeks on the New York Times Best Seller list, peaking at #2. The second book in the series, Max & the Midknights: Battle of the Bodkins was released on December 1, 2020. The third and final book in the series, Max & the Midknights: The Tower of Time, was released on March 1, 2022. Similarly to Big Nate, on November 16, 2021, Max & the Midknights has been greenlit for an animated series on Nickelodeon. The first two episodes were released on the Nicktoons YouTube channel on June 9 and July 7, 2024. The series premiered on Nickelodeon on October 30, 2024.

== Bibliography ==
- Big Nate: In a Class by Himself (2010)
- Big Nate: Strikes Again (2010)
- Big Nate: On a Roll (2011)
- Big Nate Goes for Broke (2012)
- Big Nate: Flips Out (2013)
- Big Nate: In the Zone (2014)
- Big Nate: Lives It Up (2015)
- Big Nate: Blasts Off (2016)

== Filmography ==
| Year(s) | Work | Credit(s) | Notes |
|---|---|---|---|
| 2000 | Uncle Gus in: For the Love of Monkeys | Creator, model design, writer | TV short |
| 2001 | Uncle Gus in: Not So Fast! | Creator, model design, writer | TV short |
| 2005 | Sunday Pants | Writer | Segment "The Brothers Pistov" |
| 2007 | Random! Cartoons | Co-producer | Segment "Super John Doe Junior" |
| 2009 | Spang Ho: Something Fishy | Creator, designer, writer | TV short |
| 2010 | Big Nate: In a Class by Himself | Producer, writer | Video |
| 2022–2024 | Big Nate | Based on the comic strip & books by, consulting producer | TV series |
| 2024–present | Max & the Midknights | Based on the books by, executive producer | TV series |
