= ICarly season 2 =

American teen sitcom

iCarly
- Season 2
- Starring: Miranda Cosgrove; Jennette McCurdy; Nathan Kress; Jerry Trainor
- No. of episodes: 21

Release
- Original network: Nickelodeon
- Original release: September 27, 2008 – August 8, 2009

Season chronology
- ← Previous; Season 1 Next → Season 3

The second season of iCarly aired on Nickelodeon from September 27, 2008, to August 8, 2009. The season continues the stories of Carly Shay (Miranda Cosgrove), Sam Puckett (Jennette McCurdy), and Freddie Benson (Nathan Kress) as they produce their web show "iCarly." Jerry Trainor co-stars as Carly's big brother Spencer. The second season consisted of 45 episodes, with 25 of them airing as part of the second season before the remaining 20 were marketed as the third season.

== Cast ==
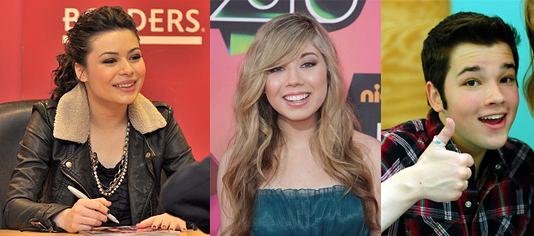
From left to right: Miranda Cosgrove, Jennette McCurdy, and Nathan Kress

=== Main cast ===
- Miranda Cosgrove as Carly Shay
- Jennette McCurdy as Sam Puckett (and as Melanie Puckett in "iTwins")
- Nathan Kress as Freddie Benson
- Jerry Trainor as Spencer Shay

=== Recurring cast ===
- Noah Munck as Gibby Gibson
- Mary Ann Springer as Wendy
- Mary Scheer as Marissa Benson
- BooG!e as T-Bo
- Reed Alexander as Nevel Papperman
- Jeremy Rowley as Lewbert
- Ryan Ochoa as Chuck Chambers
- David St. James as Mr. Howard
- Drew Roy as Griffin
- Tim Russ as Principal Ted Franklin

=== Guest stars ===
- Lucas Cruikshank as Fred Figglehorn and himself ("iMeet Fred")
- James Maslow as Shane ("iSaw Him First")
- Aria Wallace as Mandy Valdez ("iWant My Website Back")
- Good Charlotte as themselves ("iGo to Japan")
- Malese Jow as Fake Carly ("iLook Alike")
- Gabriel Basso as Fake Freddie ("iLook Alike")
- David Archuleta as himself ("iRocked the Vote")
- Haley Ramm as Missy Robinson ("iReunite with Missy")
- Alex Schemmer as Wade Collins ("iRocked the Vote")
- Victoria Justice as Shelby Marx ("iFight Shelby Marx")

== Episodes ==
No. overall	No. in season	Title	Directed by	Written by	Original release date	Prod. code	U.S. viewers (millions)
26	1	"iSaw Him First"	Adam Weissman	Teleplay by : Andrew Hill Newman; Story by : Steven Molaro	September 27, 2008	204	N/A
Carly and Sam develop a crush on Freddie's pal, Shane, and decide to compete for a relationship with him. They decide that whoever can get Shane to kiss them gets the right to pursue him. The girls set up several different scenarios to try to convince Shane into kissing them, but they are unsuccessful. Meanwhile, Spencer hires an incompetent repairman to fix the elevator. Shane eventually finds out about the girls' endeavors to pursue him, and angrily tries to leave the Shays' apartment. However, he is unaware of the broken elevator, which causes him to fall down the shaft. After the accident, the gang visits an unconscious Shane in the hospital. While no one is looking, Carly kisses Shane and deems herself victorious.
27	2	"iStage an Intervention"	Jonathan Goldstein	Karey Dornetto	October 4, 2008	205	N/A
Spencer finds an old video game cabinet in the junkyard called Pak-Rat (a parody of Pac-Man), and spends all his time playing it, while procrastinating on a commissioned Labradoodle sculpture for a doctor who is a highly-respected figure in the Seattle art community. His obsession of beating the score of Sasha Striker, the Pak-Rat world champion who disappeared for years shortly after winning, causes him to miss the deadline for his sculpture, which he manages to delay for another week. To curb his addiction, Carly, Sam and Freddie, with the help of iCarly viewers, bring Sasha Striker to compete against Spencer to defend her title. After Spencer defeats Striker in a televised match on the Video Game Network channel full of nerds who barge into the apartment, Spencer declines Striker's offer of a midnight ride in favor of finishing his sculpture for the doctor in less than nine hours with the help of Carly, Sam and Freddie; which the doctor then approves. Meanwhile, Freddie experiences a streak of "bad luck" after deleting and not forwarding a chain email, passing it off as a superstition. His bad luck experiences consist of his laptop shorting out, his bike falling apart and his shorts mysteriously turning pink. In the end he realizes the bad luck has just been a prank by Sam, so he gets her back by sending her a text message that looks like it came from a popular senior boy, asking her to go to the mall on a date. Carly later becomes addicted to Pak-Rat herself.
28	3	"iOwe You"	David Kendall	Jake Farrow	October 11, 2008	206	N/A
Sam is insulted when she hears that she does not pay back Carly and Freddie the money she owes them, which happens to be $526. When Sam finds that this is true, she makes a broadcast on iCarly encouraging all their fans to donate money to her. However, Principal Franklin informs Carly and Sam that it is illegal to solicit money to kids over the internet, so Sam grudgingly gets a job at the Chilli My Bowl restaurant to earn the money and pay them back. Elsewhere, Spencer tries to impress an attractive single mom by helping her daughter sell fudge balls (similar to Girl Scout cookies), but two rude older teen scouts steal Spencer's place at the market. Spencer comes up with the idea to send fudge balls to every iCarly fan who sent them money as he mentions in a law book it is not illegal to solicit money from kids if they provide a product or service in return. Carly and Freddie then hire someone to give the money they earned to Sam in a tip at the restaurant where she is working. Instead of repaying the money to Carly and Freddie, Sam buys a trampoline for Carly's apartment, which Carly and Freddie enjoy with her.
29	4	"iHurt Lewbert"	Russ Reinsel	Ethan Banville	October 18, 2008	207	4.37
When Carly's doorman Lewbert gets injured during one of their "Messin' with Lewbert" pranks on iCarly, Carly and her friends look after Lewbert until he is back on his feet. It is not as easy as it looks, until Freddie's mother takes over. Carly and Sam warn Freddie that his mom is in love with Lewbert, and, much to Freddie's dismay, he finds that this is true. They devise a plan to break up their romantic relationship by having Freddie fake an injury so Mrs. Benson would pay attention to her "injured" son rather than her relationship with Lewbert. Meanwhile, a pesky, disobedient young boy named Chuck plays racquetball in the lobby and Spencer gets Chuck's father to ground him for 2 days. Spencer is, in the meantime, filling in for Lewbert as the doorman. During his shifts, while using an old CB Radio, he upsets two truckers named Porkchop and Sledgehammer. Chuck, looking for revenge, gives the truckers his location through the radio while Spencer leaves his desk, and the truckers arrive just as Lewbert takes his job back. They beat him up, mistakenly assuming he is Spencer.
30	5	"iGo to Japan"	Steve Hoefer	Teleplay by : Dan Schneider; Story by : Andrew Hill Newman	November 8, 2008	201–203	7.59
In the first iCarly movie, the trio learn they have been nominated for an iWeb award and win tickets to attend the award ceremony in Japan. Spencer then trades the three first-class tickets for 5 coach tickets when Mrs. Benson refuses to let Freddie go without her. The five later skydive into Japan out of an unsanitary possum-filled cargo airplane after the pilot literally makes them fly "over" Japan. A police officer takes them to their hotel after they land in a barren field. At the hotel, they are visited by Kyoko and Yuki, fellow competitors for the same award. Kyoko and Yuki give Spencer and Mrs. Benson tickets to the hotel spa to get seaweed massages by their cousins, while they take Carly, Sam, and Freddie shopping. After confessing they are lost, Kyoko and Yuki pretend to get angry at each other and stage a kung fu fight on the sidewalk. They then strand the trio in the middle of nowhere after giving a phony excuse to leave, while Spencer breaks himself and Mrs. Benson free from being wrapped in seaweed after being abandoned by the cousins. Using a locator chip implanted in Freddie's head, Mrs. Benson and Spencer take a taxi to find the lost trio. They reunite and make it to the ceremony but are apprehended by security. Freddie wires his video camera into the main screen while Carly and Sam try to explain to the security officers what happened by acting, since the guards cannot speak English and the girls cannot speak Japanese. Since Freddie hooked up the camera to the big screen, the audience can see their silly acting. Thanks to Freddie, iCarly wins the award show due to their performance. Kyoko and Yuki are arrested for kidnapping, and the iCarly gang return to America on a fishing boat, having refused to go back on the cargo plane.
31	6	"iPie"	Roger Christiansen	Andrew Hill Newman	November 15, 2008	208	4.10
When the group's favorite pie shop closes down due to the death of the head chef and owner, Mr. Galini, they try to find the recipe for their favorite coconut-cream pie. The only person believed to have the recipe is Mr. Galini's eccentric granddaughter, Trudy. She agrees to give them the recipe if she can go on a date with Spencer, but she creeps him out and upsets him. Trudy then feels bad and confesses that she never actually owned the recipe, claiming that her grandfather "kept them in his computer" and she could never find them. Carly, Sam, and Freddie hatch a plan to find the recipe in Mr. Galini's computer at the pie shop during the memorial service. Fortunately, when Sam and Freddie were fighting in Mr. Galini's office, they accidentally knock his computer over, finding the recipes in envelopes literally stuffed inside the hard drive. Trudy, alongside Mr. Galini's assistant, Mario, re-open the pie shop. Meanwhile, Mrs. Benson's cousin is going to a comic book festival in New Jersey while her baby daughter Stephanie visits for a few days, making Freddie uneasy because the baby always has a blank expression when she sees Freddie, and he believes she does not like him because he is not funny. Freddie tries finding a way to succeed in making his cousin laugh. In the end, he makes her laugh by splatting himself in the face with a pie.
32	7	"iChristmas"	Steve Hoefer	Dan Schneider	December 13, 2008	209	3.70
When Spencer makes an electromagnetic Christmas tree, the tree is set on fire, which makes Carly very angry at Spencer because the fire also destroys the presents Carly got for Spencer. When Carly wishes that Spencer had been born "normal", Carly's Christmas angel, Mitch, makes this wish come true and proceeds to show Carly the consequences of her wish. This results in Spencer being a calm and mature lawyer, the iCarly webshow no longer existing (because the iCarly studio is now just a room filled with boxes), Sam being absent from school, Freddie dating a rude girlfriend after giving up on pursuing Carly because Nevel Papperman somehow became Carly's boyfriend, which caused her and Freddie to drift apart. Carly questions Mitch about Sam's disappearance, and Carly is taken by Mitch to the Juvenile Detention Center, where Sam is being held. Carly finds out that the reason Sam was arrested is because Spencer saw her as a bad influence and did not want Carly to be friends with her, so Sam got into more trouble without Carly to hold her back. Carly returns home and to find that Mrs. Benson and Spencer are now getting married, making Carly upset at what her life has become. After saying very sadly that she wants Sam back, wants Freddie to be her friend again, and wants Spencer to be abnormal again, Carly cries and wishes that her life was back to the way it was before, which Mitch secretly grants. Carly is now happy with the electromagnetic Christmas tree, and Carly, Sam, Freddie, and Spencer have a good Christmas together in the end.
33	8	"iKiss"	Steve Hoefer	Dan Schneider	January 3, 2009	210	5.94
To get back at Sam for pulling a prank on him at school by stuffing a dead fish in his locker, Freddie pulls a prank on her by handcuffing her to Gibby, after which an incensed Sam vows revenge. Later, when the girls come home from the lame movie "The First Kiss", this causes a discussion of who was their first kiss. A while later, Sam overhears Freddie privately inform Carly that he has never had his first real kiss. To get back at Freddie, Sam blurts out his secret on iCarly, not realizing how horribly this would make him feel. The next day at school, Freddie gets teased by Mr. Devlin, several classmates, iCarly fans, and even little girls, so he skips school for the entire week, misses two rehearsals, and refuses to show up for the next webcast, much to Sam's surprise. Carly gives Sam a stern rebuke about what she had done wrong and that she had ruined Freddie's life without even caring. Feeling guilty about what she has done, a remorseful Sam reveals to the web on iCarly that what she did was wrong and that she has never kissed anyone either. Sam then arrives at Freddie's balcony fire escape and sincerely apologizes for ruining everything, and Freddie is deeply touched by what Sam did to help him. They also discuss their mutual frustrations of not having a first kiss and their urge to get it over with. As a result, they privately kiss each other, but they both promise not to tell anyone. Meanwhile, Spencer wants to be a professional football player, so Carly aggressively trains Spencer and later sends Gibby to work out with him, but Spencer, after the harsh training, decides that he does not want to be a football player anymore.
34	9	"iGive Away a Car"	Steve Hoefer	George Doty IV	January 17, 2009	211	5.10
Carly, Sam, and Freddie are hired by car salesman Don Flanken's son Jeffery to host a riddle contest to give away a free new car as publicity for the car lot. The winner of the contest has a username called "Trickster 206" but when they call him on a video chat on the webshow it is revealed to be Nevel Papperman, much to their dismay. When Freddie and Sam go to retrieve the car for him, the two find out that the owner does not even have a son named Jeffrey and was never planning on giving away a free car, confusing them and Carly. The trio found out that Nevel was the one who created the contest, hiring a kid to pretend that he was the lot owner's son to set them up in another revenge plot to get iCarly shut down by the LCC for fraud. In order not to have their webshow shut down, iCarly must provide him with a new car. Meanwhile, Spencer buys a spaceship prop, supposedly from the movie "Galaxy Wars" (a parody of Star Wars) online, but finds out through Freddie that it is only a replica, and was never actually used in the movie. Carly decides to exploit a loophole, which says that a "new car" must be unique, not state registered and can go at least 25 mph, so they modify the spaceship prop into a working vehicle and give it to Nevel as his new car. Nevel then test-drives the spaceship car and crashes into a flower shop, and because it passes all the requirements, iCarly succeeds in preventing the end of the webshow.
35	10	"iRocked the Vote"	Russ Reinsel	Andrew Hill Newman	February 7, 2009	215	5.23
When iCarly convinces their viewers to vote for David Archuleta on America Sings, they cause him to win. They feel sorry for the runner-up, Wade Collins, who claims he wanted to win the prize money to help his sick mom get surgery. They invite Wade for an interview on the webshow and agree to make him a music video. But after the show, he snaps at the iCarly gang for ruining his life by ruining his chance of winning the contest, and is revealed to be very rude, angry, obnoxious, and narcissistic. Despite his cruelty, Carly, Sam, and Freddie help make a music video for Wade Collins. The iCarly team soon finds that Wade's mother was not sick, but he steals the video from them and gets away before they can stop him. They later have David Archuleta appear on their show and give their support to him once more; afterward they show a video to their viewers depicting Wade Collins's true selfish, rude behavior, ending with him revealing that he hates everything from children, teenagers, animals, and even America. Elsewhere, Sam teaches Spencer to lie when he has a rented movie that is 10 years overdue and he fails to lie at the rental store, but the store manager reveals that it was a prank from her boss.
36	11	"iMeet Fred"	Adam Weissman	Dan Schneider	February 16, 2009	212	5.10
When Freddie offends an international internet sensation named Fred and tells the whole world he does not think his Fred videos are very funny, Fred tells all of his fans that he will not make any more videos. Carly, Sam, and Freddie soon start losing friends, acquaintances, and iCarly fans that are fans of Fred, and everybody at Ridgeway Junior High begins to hate the iCarly group by booing and throwing stuff at them. Everyone even begins abusing Freddie in many painful ways and he unfairly gets kicked out of all his clubs. Before they got home, his aunt Jennifer called him on the phone talking to him about what he did, a Fred fan created a website called neverwatchiCarly.com that gets viewers to stop watching iCarly, and reporters barged into Carly's apartment and starts criticizing them by interviewing them about the incident. They meet Lucas Cruikshank, Fred's creator and portrayer, in his home in Shelby, Idaho for Freddie to apologize to him about the Fred videos comment and giving his opinion. Lucas later apologizes because he was not really mad; it was a publicity stunt meant to increase Fred and iCarly's ratings. At the end they apologize live during the iCarly webshow and present a new Fred video with Sam, Freddie, and Spencer guest starring as themselves with high-pitched voices like Fred except Carly's voice. Elsewhere, Spencer puts a Magic Eight Ball-like toy, called a Magic Meatball, in control of his life, with disastrous results such as drinking ketchup and buying a live ostrich.
37	12	"iLook Alike"	David Kendall	Dan Schneider	March 7, 2009	213	6.29
Carly, Sam, and Freddie are thrilled when they are invited to a mixed martial arts fight to do an iCarly bit filmed backstage, though Spencer and Mrs. Benson do not approve. Upset by this, they set up a risky scheme to sneak out by hiring some lookalikes who live in the area to take their place while they go to the fight in hopes that Spencer will not find out.
38	13	"iWant My Website Back"	Adam Weissman	Matt Fleckenstein	March 21, 2009	219	3.90
Spencer gets a new credit card after canceling his old one when trying to order some new pillows at pillowmyhead.com, causing Carly, Sam, and Freddie to lose control of the iCarly.com domain because it automatically charges on his credit card. Luckily, iCarly's insanely biggest fan Mandy (from the Season 1 episode 13 "iAm Your Biggest Fan") returns to buy their website back for them, but she gets tricked into accidentally giving it to Nevel. Spencer disguises himself as an old woman in order to trick Nevel into signing the URL transfer document during an autograph event, but Nevel recognizes and outsmarts him, and he is chased out by security. Later, Nevel demands a kiss from Carly from the day they first met (in "iNevel") in return to claim the transfer document. Carly confronts Nevel, and he signs the document. Carly manages to escape with the signed document without having to kiss Nevel, and succeeds in reclaiming their website. Elsewhere, Spencer is stuck with 200 pillows after believing he ordered only two. It is revealed that pillowmyhead.com multiplied his order. In the end, Carly, Sam, and Freddie shut the door on Mandy when she rambles about wanting to take them out to a movie.
39	14	"iMake Sam Girlier"	Roger Christiansen	Jake Farrow	April 11, 2009	216	5.13
After an iCarly webcast, everyone celebrates Sam's birthday. During the party, everyone has to give a speech about how they feel about Sam. When Sam's crush, Pete, makes his speech, he calls Sam a "dude" because she is so tough and tomboyish. Depressed by this, she goes to Carly for help on how to be girlier. It works until a senior bully at school, Jocelyn, arrives to harass the iCarly team. Sam tries to maintain her "girliness" until Jocelyn pushes Carly, at which point she fights Jocelyn and scares the bullies away. Unbeknownst to her, Pete is watching. At first, Sam becomes upset, but then her spirits lighten up when Pete tells her that he likes the way she is. In the end, Sam and Pete happily go on another date. Meanwhile, Spencer meets a girl at the grocery store and becomes convinced that she only likes him when he is wearing his tuxedo after a date with her does not go so well when he was wearing casual clothes.
40	15	"iGo Nuclear"	David Kendall	George Doty IV & Andrew Hill Newman	April 22, 2009	214	4.50
Carly, Sam, and Freddie are assigned to do a project for Green Week by their science teacher, Mr. Henning, who threatens to send his students on the "Root & Berry Retreat" for extra credit if they do not get a good grade on their projects. Since Freddie is already making a technology composting box, Carly fashions an "environmentally friendly" electric scooter with a car battery, but it only goes four miles per hour, and shorts out when it gets wet in the rain, then bursts into flames after she reaches school, causing her to fail. Freddie's technology composting project fails as Henning questions his choice to import worms from Portugal, resulting in a lot of jet fuel burnt from an airplane, resulting in Freddie having to go to the "Root & Berry Retreat". Sam, who did not even do a project, manages to impress Henning with her improvised speech, with her eating and drinking the juice from an orange to help reduce packaging waste from other snack foods. Henning later gives Carly the weekend to do a new project. Spencer brings in a good-looking science geek named Cal, who helps build a small power generator utilizing nuclear energy, but it turns out to be highly illegal, since it is powered by black-market uranium, unbeknownst to Carly and her friends. Some policemen recognize Cal as a Top 10 FBI's most wanted criminal at the Groovy Smoothie and pursue him. As punishment for the illegal project, aiding, and getting help from a known felon, Henning sentences Carly to the "Root & Berry Retreat" for extra credit.
41	16	"iDate a Bad Boy"	Steve Hoefer	Dan Schneider	May 9, 2009	217 / 225	6.47
Carly and Spencer catch their new neighbor, Griffin, stealing Spencer's motorcycle. They reprimand Griffin, but Spencer eventually lets him off the hook, despite Carly's begrudging disposition. Following this incident, Spencer befriends Griffin andmentors him by inviting him over to help with a sculpture - much to Carly's dismay. After working on the sculpture for some time, Spencer goes out to buy smoothies for the group. Spencer then returns home to see Griffin kissing Carly, who frantically tries to explain her newfound feelings for Griffin, but this only infuriates Spencer further. Consequently, Spencer forbids the couple from seeing each other by policing Carly's daily life. Sick of Spencer's paranoid regimen, Carly and Griffin devise a plan to see each other. Their plan is quickly thwarted by Spencer, who, despite their deceptive efforts, then finally lets the couple be together. Meanwhile, Sam pays Freddie to build a website for her, and has a contract written up as well. Freddie agrees, and begins building the website around Sam's request. However, as their partnership progresses, Freddie expresses that he cannot keep up with Sam's numerous demands, and tears up the contract. Sam then reveals that she has sold the website for $1,000, and because of their voided contract, Freddie is not entitled to any of the profit. Sam later turns to Spencer to help with a strange nightmare she has been having about a monster eating her soup. Carly and Griffin's relationship advances happily and without flaw, until Griffin reveals that he obsessively and neurotically collects a series of stuffed animals called "Pee Wee Babies" (a parody of Beanie Babies). Carly is taken aback, and consults Sam about Griffin's compulsive collection, and considers breaking up with him because of it. The girls eventually begin passing jokes about Griffin and his plush toy collection. Griffin, who had come to see Carly, overhears their conversation as they mock his collection; he is deeply insulted and upset with Carly for making fun of him, and immediately ends their relationship. Despite this, Carly is relieved that Griffin is gone.
42	17	"iReunite with Missy"	Adam Weissman	Jake Farrow	May 16, 2009	218	4.30
Carly's old friend, Missy Robinson from when they were young, returns to Seattle and tries to become Carly's only best friend and replace Sam. After inviting Carly and Sam to a ride on a helicopter, she texts Sam the wrong address, sending her to a piñata shell factory instead. Missy then "accidentally" destroys Sam's cell phone, and gives her expired chocolates, which make Sam fall sick right before the webcast while Missy substitutes for her. Sam realizes Missy is up to something, but no one believes her since they think that Sam is just being paranoid. When Carly is not around, Missy confesses to Sam, believing that Carly will not believe anything bad about Missy. Sam is forced to ask Freddie for help, but he initially refuses to believe her until she admits this is the first time she had ever asked him for his help in a serious situation. When Missy is awarded with a six-month cruise from the school to study at sea, Carly overhears Missy's plans to destroy her and Sam's friendship and abandons Missy angrily. Later, Wendy tells Carly that Freddie originally won the trip but gave it to Missy, and Carly realizes that Freddie does care about Sam. Carly then mentions that Missy used to get seasick, but probably got over it. However, it is shown in the last scene that Missy still does get seasick and the cruise is anything but luxurious. Elsewhere, while Spencer is packing for a camping trip, he is locked in a storage compartment in the basement by Chuck, who is seeking revenge on Spencer for telling on him and getting him grounded for playing racquetball in the lobby for two days when he was filling in for Lewbert. Chuck is eventually caught and is grounded by his father once again, only though Spencer remains trapped in the storage compartment.
43	18	"iTake on Dingo"	David Kendall	Jake Farrow	June 13, 2009	226	3.40
After an episode of iCarly, Wendy and the other kids at school tell Carly, Sam, and Freddie that a show on the Dingo Channel (parody of Disney Channel) called "Totally Teri" used Random Dancing in an episode, calling it "Random Jumping" while her little brother was watching it. Carly, Sam, and Freddie find out that they even spoofed "Messin' with Lewbert" calling it "Messin' with Rupert". Spencer and the iCarly team go to Hollywood to settle the issue, staying in a very low-quality, seedy motel that Sam's mom recommended. Visiting Dingo Studios, Carly and Sam confront the "Totally Teri" writers, who confess that they are plagiarizing iCarly skits to use for their show; they claim they have rights to do so since they have lawyers, money, and power. Meanwhile, Spencer and Freddie find Charles Dingo's rumored frozen head (a parody of an urban legend surrounding Walt Disney being cryogenically frozen after his death) and come up with a plan. The next day, the iCarly group threatens to release depictions of Dingo's frozen head on iCarly.com unless the writers swear not to steal the show's ideas again. The writers swear on camera that they will never do it ever again, but Sam makes two of the writers wear bikini tops and fight with dog food on the show as revenge for stealing their ideas.
44	19	"iMust Have Locker 239"	David Kendall	Eric Goldberg & Peter Tibbals	June 27, 2009	220	3.98
Sam and Freddie are forced to share the school's biggest and best locker after winning a contest to see how many Fat Cakes were in a jar. After Sam continually uses the locker to throw parties and get Freddie in trouble, Freddie offers Sam $200 for her half of their locker, and Sam approves. A few moments later, Sam's mom comes to pick Sam up after getting laser eye surgery, and inadvertently destroys the locker by backing into the school wall with her car. Sam jumps in the car with Freddie's money, leaving him face to face with Mr. Howard. Elsewhere, Carly tries to get some art lessons by Spencer after drawing an ugly bunny during the webcast, he instead teaches her about sculpting, leading her to drop the lessons. Carly takes an art class at the Seattle Community Center. Spencer barges in, telling the teacher that she is not teaching "art" correctly, which results in a fight, as they splatter paint on each other, resulting in Spencer and Carly getting banned from the center. After Spencer apologises to Carly and offers to teach her to draw, the art teacher arrives and admits Spencer was right about being spontaneous and passionate in order to become a true artist; the two then share a kiss.
45	20	"iTwins"	Russ Reinsel	Eric Goldberg & Peter Tibbals	July 11, 2009	224	5.22
Carly and Sam assume that Freddie is gullible after they trick him into coming to school dressed as a clown. Sam later gets annoyed when her twin sister Melanie comes home for three days. Believing it is just another of Sam and Carly's pranks to show how gullible Freddie is, he does not believe it, so he invites Melanie to a dance with him as his date. The plan to prove Melanie is really "Sam" takes an unexpected turn when Melanie kisses Freddie, who then becomes extremely worried. Since Freddie refuses to believe it, Sam "admits" to Freddie that there is no Melanie. Satisfied, Freddie leaves right before Melanie arrives to go to the mall with Sam and Carly, proving Freddie wrong. Elsewhere, Carly tutors Spencer's nemesis Chuck in math, and Spencer tries to prove to Carly how evil Chuck really is. After several failed attempts, he sets up a secret webcam which captures Chuck harming Spencer when Carly is not in the room. Angered by Chuck's deception, Carly gets revenge on Chuck by telling him there is a new number called "derf" between 5 and 6, and because of this, Chuck fails his math test. Although Chuck blames Carly, his dad doesn't and Chuck gets grounded for 3 weeks. Spencer gives Chuck's dad a brochure about a summer math camp he attended as a kid, called Camp Add-em-Up, sending Chuck to math camp for the whole summer.
46	21	"iFight Shelby Marx"	Steve Hoefer	Dan Schneider	August 8, 2009	221–222	7.86
After watching martial-arts champ, Shelby Marx, win another MMA match on TV, Carly jokingly challenges Shelby to a match while on the webcast. However, someone then edits the joke challenge to make it look and sound serious, which Shelby sees and surprises a frightened Carly by wanting to fight her. However, as Shelby promises not to hurt her, they agree to have an exhibition fight for charity. Unfortunately, Carly accidentally falls on Shelby's sickly grandmother during a press conference after Sam teaches her how to "trash talk", causing Shelby to get angry. Fearing that Shelby will hurt her, Carly withdraws the fight only to be ridiculed as a coward by her friends, teachers, and Nevel. Carly visits Shelby and apologizes, and the fight is back on, with Shelby again promising to go easy on her. Nevel later alters a clip of the press conference to make it look like Carly intentionally tackled Shelby's grandma to dupe Shelby into fighting Carly. Shelby, furious, legitimately attacks Carly during the match. Carly clings onto Shelby's leg for the rest of the fight to avoid being hit. Nevel's plot is revealed and as punishment, he is trapped in a cage with an angry Shelby, Carly, and Sam. Shelby later appears on iCarly, now firm friends with the gang. Elsewhere, Spencer suffers from ridiculous side effects while taking an experimental allergy medication given to him by a doctor. The effects include sweating, itching, uncontrollable thirst, short-term memory loss, and muscle spasms.
