= ICarly season 1 =

American teen sitcom

iCarly
- Season 1
- Starring: Miranda Cosgrove; Jennette McCurdy; Nathan Kress; Jerry Trainor
- No. of episodes: 25

Release
- Original network: Nickelodeon
- Original release: September 8, 2007 – July 25, 2008

Season chronology
- Next → Season 2

The first season of iCarly aired on Nickelodeon from September 8, 2007, to July 25, 2008. The season introduces Carly Shay (Miranda Cosgrove), Sam Puckett (Jennette McCurdy), Freddie Benson (Nathan Kress), and Spencer Shay (Jerry Trainor). This is the only season without a 1-hour special.

== Production ==
The series was created and executive produced by Dan Schneider, who has created many other shows for the network. The show was produced by Schneider's Bakery and Nickelodeon Productions. The series is filmed at Nickelodeon on Sunset Studios in Hollywood, California. The theme song "Leave It All to Me" written by Michael Corcoran and is performed by Miranda Cosgrove, featuring Drake Bell.

All episodes from this season were originally produced in the 14:9 format, then cropped to 4:3 for broadcast and 16:9 for widescreen release, as opposed to later seasons which switched directly to 16:9 widescreen production. The season began production in January 2007.

== Cast ==
=== Main cast ===
- Miranda Cosgrove as Carly Shay
- Jennette McCurdy as Sam Puckett
- Nathan Kress as Freddie Benson
- Jerry Trainor as Spencer Shay

=== Recurring cast ===
- Colin Spensor as Wesley
- Noah Munck as Gibby Gibson
- Mary Scheer as Marissa Benson
- Jeremy Rowley as Lewbert
- Mindy Sterling as Ms. Francine Briggs
- David St. James as Mr. Howard
- Tim Russ as Principal Franklin
- Nathan Pearson as Jeremy
- Joseph Buttler as Mr. Stern
- Doug Brochu as Duke
- Reed Alexander as Nevel Papperman
- Greg Mullavy as Grandad Shay
- Christopher David as Rodney Goober

=== Guest stars ===
- Austin Butler as Jake ("iLike Jake")
- Christopher Michael as Officer Carl ("iWant More Viewers")
- Eric Nelsen as Zeke ("iDream of Dance")
- Nicole Gale Anderson as Tasha ("iNevel")
- Charles Kim as Chuck ("iNevel")
- Estelle Harris as Mrs. Halberstadt ("iScream on Halloween")
- Carly Bondar as Valerie ("iWill Date Freddie")
- Plain White T's as themselves ("iRue the Day")
- Adrian Neil as Mr. Devlin ("iPromise Not to Tell")
- Aria Wallace as Mandy Valdez ("iAm Your Biggest Fan")
- Aaron Albert as Jonah ("iHate Sam's Boyfriend")
- Randall Park as Mr. Palladino ("iGot Detention")
- Asante Jones as Detective Tragg ("iStakeout")
- Ryan Bollman as Spanky Stimbler ("iStakeout")
- Wyatt Carper as Spanky's son ("iStakeout")
- Curtis Armstrong as Store Clerk ("iStakeout")
- Shayne Topp as Philip Brownley ("iMight Switch Schools")
- Leon Thomas III as Harper ("iCarly Saves TV")
- Sammi Hanratty as Morgan Brenner ("iCarly Saves TV")
- Rachel G. Fox as Amber Tate ("iCarly Saves TV")
- David Starzyk as Brad Brenner ("iCarly Saves TV")
- Jessica Makinson as Miss Lauren Ackerman ("iHave a Lovesick Teacher")

== Episodes ==
No. overall	No. in season	Title	Directed by	Written by	Original release date	Prod. code	U.S. viewers (millions)
1	1	"iPilot"	Steve Hoefer	Dan Schneider	September 8, 2007	101	4.1
13-year-old Carly Shay is accused of digitally altering a photo of her teacher, Ms. Briggs, even though her best friend, Sam, is the true culprit. As punishment, she is forced to monitor auditions for the school talent show. Carly decides to bring Sam, while her next-door neighbor, Freddie, who has a crush on Carly, volunteers to bring his tech equipment to videotape the auditions. After the auditions, they write a list of people they want to be in the talent show. However, much to Carly's and Sam's distress, Freddie accidentally uploads a clip of Carly and Sam making fun of Ms. Briggs to SplashFace, which quickly goes viral. While they have the video removed, the girls are flattered by comments complimenting their sense of humor. Carly and Sam give Ms. Briggs a DVD of the auditions, only for her to reveal she saw the video and reject their list of recommended acts. Carly is then inspired to make their own webshow in which they can do whatever they want without people stopping it, and with her brother Spencer's permission, they redecorate the third floor into a makeshift studio for the webshow, named "iCarly" by Freddie. Their first webcast, featuring many of their favorite acts from the auditions, is a huge success.
2	2	"iWant More Viewers"	Adam Weissman	Steve Holland & Steven Molaro	September 8, 2007	103	3.9
Carly, Sam, Freddie, and Spencer all compete to see who can draw more viewers to iCarly, with the loser having to touch Lewbert's wart. Carly and Sam make a sign to hold up outside the window of the studios for Seattle Beat, but the thunderstorm ruins the sign. Freddie and Spencer build an electronic sign to put up on a freeway, but the glare of the sign causes a massive car pile-up. As Spencer frantically tries to turn the sign off, it unexpectedly shorts out live on-the-air, going from saying "PLEASE GO ONLINE TO iCARLY.COM" to saying "P_E__E __ ON____ __ _CARL_____", much to the displeasure of a police officer named Carl. However, both mishaps still result in more viewers for the show.
3	3	"iDream of Dance"	Adam Weissman	Dan Schneider	September 16, 2007	113	3.5
Watching a boring performance by a Scottish dancer in Ms. Briggs' class inspires Carly, Sam, and Freddie to show dance clips on iCarly. Their fans send over 3,000 video clips, and the three are forced to watch 500 clips each night before the next webcast. Some are boring, but Carly and Sam instantly fall for an amazing dancer who Freddie takes a dislike to. They later fall asleep and have dreams about dancing. One dream is everyone dancing in the school corridor, Sam's dream is her detention class dancing to Ms. Briggs' bagpipes, Freddie's dream is himself dancing to impress Carly in a Michael Jackson like-way and Carly's dream is her dancing with many boys in tuxedos in her empty living room. Spencer wakes everyone up by preparing to show them his "Firecracker" dance, which he had been looking for his gear to perform, but everyone is too tired to see it. Freddie goes home and Carly and Sam decide to sleep in Carly's bedroom. A disappointed Spencer then sleeps on the couch and ends up having the same dream as Carly.
4	4	"iLike Jake"	Steve Hoefer	Dan Schneider	September 22, 2007	102	3.5
Upon learning that her crush, Jake Krandle, has broken up with his girlfriend, Carly invites Jake to come to her apartment and see the iCarly studio. When he tells her that he plays the guitar and sings a little bit, she asks him to perform on iCarly, only to find out that he is not as good as he thinks he is. Carly and Sam ask Freddie to edit his voice so that people will not make fun of him. Freddie does this even though he does not like Jake because Carly likes him, which makes Jake sound better, and Carly thanks Freddie by kissing him on the nose. In the end, he ends up getting back together with his ex-girlfriend after she hears him sing on iCarly, and because he assumes that Carly is dating Freddie after seeing her kiss his nose. Meanwhile, Carly helps Spencer create a splatter paint sculpture. Spencer later has to put a large amount of clay over his head and has trouble with breathing, drinking water, and coordination.
5	5	"iWanna Stay with Spencer"	Adam Weissman	Arthur Gradstein	September 29, 2007	105	N/A
After Spencer's newly-built Fan of Hammers malfunctions live on iCarly and Carly nearly gets decapitated by a hammer, their visiting grandfather, concerned that Spencer is too irresponsible to be Carly's guardian, plans to take her with him to Yakima, WA for safety. Not wanting to leave for Yakima, Carly tries to make her grandfather change his mind, which ultimately fails when Spencer's dinner catches fire. Spencer then realizes that he is irresponsible and agrees to let Carly move with her grandfather. When Carly is about to leave, Spencer runs upstairs and grabs her inhaler, which she has not needed in several years, and her grandfather realizes how responsible Spencer is and lets Carly stay, promising that he will visit from time to time.
6	6	"iNevel"	Steve Hoefer	Steve Holland	October 6, 2007	104	3.6
When the gang is handing out fliers to go to iCarly to everyone in their school, a girl says that their web show must be lame since there is no review of it on Nevelocity.com. Carly arranges to be interviewed by the young web critic Nevel Papperman, who runs Nevelocity, at his house. During their meeting, Nevel repeatedly flirts with her, and then kisses her on the cheek. Carly retaliates by smearing tapenade on his face, and he promises that she will rue the day. Out of anger, Nevel writes a bad review for the webcast. The gang eventually tell Nevel's mother, who punishes him by making him write an honest and positive review. Meanwhile, Spencer makes a sculpture out of butter called Toasty the Baker for a bread convention, but has to restart it after Sam turns up the heat and accidentally melts it.
7	7	"iScream on Halloween"	Steve Hoefer	Jake Farrow	October 20, 2007	114	N/A
On Halloween, Carly, Sam, and Freddie do a special webcast in apartment 13B, a supposedly haunted apartment. Numerous spooky things happen: lights fail, "blood" appears, objects fall and break, and the apartment owners return early. The apartment is later revealed to be an old apartment as the owners give explanations of the happenings, and the iCarly crew find that the doorman, Lewbert, had only told them it was haunted as a prank. Meanwhile, Spencer is making a giant jack-o-lantern and forgets to buy candy for the trick-or-treaters. When he gives them ridiculous items such as a carton of eggs and jumper cables, they storm into the room, causing Spencer to hide in his monstrous jack-o-lantern. They roll him out to the hallway and out to the street, into the harbor where the pumpkin sinks. Upon returning home, Spencer warns the iCarly viewers to remember to buy candy on Halloween.
8	8	"iSpy a Mean Teacher"	Steve Hoefer	Steven Molaro	November 3, 2007	106	N/A
Because Ms. Briggs is mean to everyone, Carly and Freddie spy on her to see what mean teachers do after school for a segment on iCarly. They find out she is addicted to Randy Jackson. They eventually get caught when Sam tries to get them out, and Freddie accidentally breaks her bagpipes by tripping over them. She threatens to call the police and expel them unless she performs on their webshow. She ends up performing on the bagpipes and their view count drops instantly. When they use the green screen, that Freddie recently installed for the show, to get hilarious backgrounds, people come back and iCarly has more viewers than ever.
9	9	"iWill Date Freddie"	Adam Weissman	Steve Holland	November 10, 2007	108	N/A
While doing a "Blab Cam" bit on iCarly, Freddie gets a date with a girl named Valerie, who goes to the same school as him, Carly, and Sam. They have a dinner date in Carly's apartment, and Spencer is their waiter. They start to like each other, but soon she wants to do her own webcast on the same day as iCarly. She then points out how Sam does not treat him like an important member of iCarly, which entices Freddie to begin working only with Valerie and production of iCarly suffers. Things get worse when Valerie invites Sam to come to her webcast. However, Freddie realizes his mistake and breaks up with Valerie, though Sam is forced to tell him how important he is to iCarly before he can come back as their technical producer.
10	10	"iWant a World Record"	Roger Christiansen	Dan Schneider	November 17, 2007	107	N/A
Carly, Sam, and Freddie want to break a world record for the longest webcast, currently set at 24 hours and 8 minutes. However they still continue webcasting while being evacuated from the apartment after a gas leak in the studio and resort to dipping their heads in ice water when they become tired during the show. Meanwhile, downstairs, Spencer builds a large sculpture full of moving parts out of all the trash stored in crates. Unfortunately, when he powers-on his sculpture, the power goes out, interrupting the show for only four seconds before it can break the world record. Spencer inadvertently sets his own record, because his kinetic sculpture has the most moving parts in the world. Feeling bad, he asks Carly, Sam, and Freddie to attach the last part onto his sculpture, including them in the record so that they can get their picture in the book. The world's fattest priest also comes as a surprise for Sam, but he falls through the floor.
11	11	"iRue the Day"	David Kendall	Dan Schneider	December 1, 2007	115	N/A
Spencer saves Tom Higgenson, lead singer of the Plain White T's, by knocking him out of the way when an obstacle comes flying down from a mall food court, and gets him to sign Spencer's back. Carly strikes a deal with Spencer, and they will perform live on iCarly. Unfortunately, their website is hacked by Nevel, who tries to ruin their website in revenge for Carly refusing to kiss him and smearing tapenade on his face. They sneak into Nevel's house to hack into his server and crash his website, and Nevel's grandma walks in, who thinks Freddie, hanging by a cord, is a spider. They distract her by being her "personal trainers", allowing them to free Freddie and escape. When they go home, Nevel remotely hacks Freddie's computer. While they try to do the webcast later, Nevel blocks the signal and pretends to be Carly. Military soldiers suddenly appear, thanks to Carly's friend from the Air Force, and override Nevel, put him on a dangling cord and forcing him to apologize to Carly before leaving, after which the Plain White T's perform on the restored webshow.
12	12	"iPromise Not to Tell"	Steve Hoefer	Dicky Murphy	January 12, 2008	118	3.9
After Carly gets a B+ on her history paper by Mr. Devlin due to printing on three hole paper, Carly gets upset because she wanted to get straight A's, and this grade prevents her from doing so. After overhearing Principal Franklin's username and password to the school's network, Sam changes Carly's grade to give her the straight A's she deserves. After finding out about this, however, Carly feels guilty about the grade change, so she and Freddie try to change it back, but are stopped by Franklin and the Computer Security Agency because Freddie's hacking caused a breach in the school's network. They cover themselves by telling Franklin that they wanted to know when his birthday was, and they give him her microwave oven. Feeling guilty, Carly tells Spencer, who tells her that she has to decide which is more important, keeping a promise to Sam or telling the truth. The next day, she storms into Franklin's office to take the blame for the grade hacking, only for him to get confused because Freddie tried to take the blame earlier. In the end, however, Sam confesses and Franklin books her detention for two days for six weeks while letting Carly and Freddie off the hook for letting him keep the microwave oven. When they leave to go to an Assembly, Sam sneaks back in and attempts to change her detention for one day for two weeks, but before she finishes, Carly angrily grabs her hair and drags her out.
13	13	"iAm Your Biggest Fan"	Steve Hoefer	Jake Farrow	January 19, 2008	110	N/A
iCarly's biggest fan, Mandy, becomes the show's first one-kid live audience. However, she begins following the cast incessantly and refuses to leave them alone, which annoys the trio. They unsuccessfully try to find out how to get her to stop. Meanwhile, Spencer finds a set of drums and signs up for a band to play drums with. They accept him even though they only wanted to find a place to rehearse. The band also has a great dislike for Spencer's amateur drumming skills, even though Spencer gets Socko to book them on Seattle Beat, a show they desperately wanted to go on, but later kick him out, going with their appearance on the show. Mandy listens to their music and then disrupts their appearance on Seattle Beat, much to the gang's amusement and the band's irritation.
14	14	"iHeart Art"	Adam Weissman	Arthur Gradstein	February 2, 2008	109	3.6
Carly asks Spencer's art idol, Harry Joyner, to see Spencer's sculptures. Spencer is crushed when Joyner tells him he has no talent. To make it up to him, Carly decides to showcase all of Spencer's sculptures on iCarly, but despite the sculptures on the webcast getting many positive comments, Spencer gives up art and takes up an assistant job at the local dentistry. Meanwhile, Sam struggles to resist the temptation to insult Freddie for a whole week so she does not have to pay him $5.00 for each insult. Carly and her friends confront Joyner about his criticism, and he finally admits to Spencer that he was jealous of Spencer's talent. The dentist then commissions Spencer to build a sculpture for his building, which Joyner volunteers to help Spencer build. He gives $40 each of his advance payment to Sam and Freddie and $41 to Carly as a thanks for helping him rediscover his passion; Sam then uses her $40 to insult Freddie, leaving him with $80.
15	15	"iHate Sam's Boyfriend"	Roger Christiansen	Dan Schneider	February 9, 2008	120	3.5
Sam begins going out with Freddie's classmate, Jonah, and the two become inseparable. However, when the relationship begins to affect iCarly, Carly and Freddie decide that they have to do something. After Jonah proves to be disruptive and continuously distracts Sam, Carly talks to Jonah. Jonah tries to kiss Carly, which freaks her out. Sam overhears Carly talking to Freddie about it. She gets back at Jonah by putting him in a "wedgie bounce" live on iCarly. Elsewhere, Spencer makes a claymation film for a short film contest, which requires him to animate the characters frame-by-frame.
16	16	"iHatch Chicks"	David Kendall	Steven Molaro	February 23, 2008	111	4.2
Carly and Sam decide to hatch baby chicks for a science project. However, the chicks hatch early, escape, and get lost in the apartment. Carly, Sam, Freddie, and Spencer learn that if they do not find the chicks in time, the chicks will probably die, and they must search frantically before time runs out. During their search, Spencer gets stuck in the heating duct while trying to save one of the chicks. Finally, they find all the baby chicks, after Spencer coughs up the last one.
17	17	"iDon't Want to Fight"	Roger Christiansen	Arthur Gradstein	March 1, 2008	112	4.5
Carly and Sam start fighting when Sam trades a special T-shirt, which Carly made for her, for concert tickets that were really hard to get, which Carly then refuses to attend. Their argument continues into their webcast, and Freddie fears for iCarly's future. The next week, Freddie hosts a special edition of the show where he debates whether Carly is right or Sam is right or that they are just being dumb and should still be best friends. Many fans agree on the latter option so Carly and Sam apologize and become friends again. Meanwhile, Spencer tries to feed his fish using an automatic fish feeding machine; this fails several times until the end when he builds a successful one.
18	18	"iPromote Techfoots"	Adam Weissman	Arthur Gradstein	March 15, 2008	117	4.3
The iCarly gang get excited when the popular shoe company, Daka, wants to promote their new shoe, the "Techfoot", on iCarly. Daka offers them $100,000, so Carly uses her share of their first $8,333.33 monthly payment to buy many pairs of sunglasses, Freddie buys a new laptop and Sam hires a personal chef to feed her whenever she wants food. The shoes, however, turn out to have numerous problems: they squeak a lot, are very uncomfortable, their built-in Wi-Fi crashes Freddie's laptop, Carly gets electrocuted from stepping in a puddle causing her hair to frizz and the shoes to fall apart, the built-in heating system causes the shoes to explode upon heavy impact, and iCarly begins losing viewers who are unhappy about the company's actions. Carly, Sam, and Freddie must figure out how to end the deal with the corrupt Daka without legal action against them and prevent their show from losing viewers. Elsewhere, after Spencer endures multiple mishaps while riding on the bus; including waking up in Canada after a nap, he invents his own bike, which is destroyed when a street sweeper sucks it in. He roller blades instead, then after falling into a dumpster, he decides to walk. Carly, Sam, and Freddie then talk about the shoe on their next webcast doing stuff that damages the shoe (tearing the front open, using the Wi-Fi on the laptop, and enflaming it). Spencer reviews that to Daka after learning from 72 hours of law school, revealing that iCarly did not break the rules of their contract as they talked about the shoes "in a positive way". Daka then negotiate to buy iCarly out of their contract; the gang then demand they pay them $30,000 and refund all of their customers for their shoes. Carly then uses her $10,000 from Daka to buy Spencer a new motorbike so he will not do anymore transportation. They then travel to Canada so Spencer can get Canadian Bacon, even though it is just sliced ham.
19	19	"iGot Detention"	Roger Christiansen	Andrew Hill Newman	March 22, 2008	116	3.7
Carly, Sam, and Freddie are planning on presenting iCarly's 50th webshow spectacular, but Sam accidentally assaults Mr. Howard with a football and gets detention on the same day they were preparing to air the show. As a result, they decide to do iCarly in detention. After numerous attempts, only Carly manages to get into detention, but Freddie is not successful, so he decides to film iCarly secretly, hiding in a closet. But, Mr. Howard catches them and insults Principal Franklin, calling him a weak, spineless fool. It turns out that Franklin was also watching iCarly and busts Mr. Howard. Meanwhile, Spencer volunteers to collect golf balls from the pond at the golf center and trades them for art supplies. He builds a gigantic coffee cup and puts five hundred gallons of coffee into it, but later drops his cell phone into it, so he dives in to get it. Later on, Carly, Sam, and Freddie join him to celebrate their 50th webcast.
20	20	"iStakeout"	Steve Hoefer	Andrew Hill Newman	April 5, 2008	121	4.1
After airing a segment on iCarly that involved recording someone on the street, two policemen use the loft as a stakeout to track a clerk from selling pirated DVDs that was spotted on iCarly's broadcast, but seem to be taking too long, and eat all of Carly and Spencer's food. While making a cake for Socko's birthday, Spencer realizes one of the detectives is an old bully from camp, Stew "Spanky" Stimbler known for frequently spanking people at unexpected times. In addition, the stakeout is badly affecting the webcast. Carly eventually has had enough of the police's presence in her home, so the iCarly gang goes undercover to find the criminal clerk (Curtis Armstrong), only to find out that he only sells mediocre homemade movies about pirates rather than pirated movies. The cops then decide to pack up and leave. Afterwards, Carly later walks back downstairs only to find Spencer getting his revenge on Spanky by spanking him in front of his cheering son. Meanwhile, Freddie loses a bet with Sam and must get a tattoo of Sam's face on his left arm, which he tries to hide from his mother, unaware that it is actually temporary.
21	21	"iMight Switch Schools"	David Kendall	Dicky Murphy	April 26, 2008	122	3.3
Sam and Freddie are upset when Carly is offered a full scholarship to Briarwood Prep, a private school. They do not want her to accept because it would mean the end of iCarly. Sam and Freddie come up with a scheme that will make sure Carly will not leave. Meanwhile, Spencer creates a mini golf course that becomes popular with many kids. Sam and Freddie decide to use this to sabotage Carly's interview with Briarwood's principal; scheduling it at the same time and same place as a mini golf party in the Shay apartment. They go way too far when they get the kids to chase after the principal looking for a purple ball. When Carly confronts them, they confess to the principal that they tried to mess up the interview because they did not want Carly to leave Ridgeway because they would miss her. The principal, seeing that Carly has friends who care about her, agrees to consider letting Carly into Briarwood but is chased away by the kids. This makes Carly realize that she does not want to go to Briarwood anyway.
22	22	"iFence"	Russ Reinsel	Dan Schneider	May 10, 2008	123	3.5
When Freddie realizes that he cannot keep hanging with girls all the time, Spencer encourages him to take up fencing as a new hobby and have some "guy time" with him. When Spencer's rival, Doug Toder, sees how good Freddie is, Spencer puts Freddie up against him in a match of fencing. Carly is mad at Spencer and Freddie both for not helping her out during the visit of their weird and nerdy cousins, the Dorfmans, and his obsession with fencing, so she forbids him from fencing with Freddie and takes it further by telling Mrs. Benson, who sends Freddie home for a tick bath when he does not even have ticks. Carly begins to realize how much he deserves to have some "guy time", and tries to convince Mrs. Benson to change her mind. When Freddie asks his mother why she hates fencing so much, she tells a story about her grandfather, who lead a circus troupe called "The Fencin' Bensons" and forced his obsession of fencing onto her entire family including her; she wanted to avoid Freddie suffering the same fate. During the match, Toder cheats by pushing Freddie to the floor with his elbow, causing an enraged Mrs. Benson to aggressively showcase her own talent for fencing; she fends off Toder and his two sidekicks simultaneously. Meanwhile, Sam and Freddie have a bet to see if Sam can read a book for her school assignment. Sam gets interested in books for the first time and finishes the book on her own, winning the bet. She then forces Freddie to pay up by putting a running water hose down his pants to make him look like he wet himself.
23	23	"iCarly Saves TV"	Steve Hoefer	Jake Farrow	June 13, 2008	119	4.5
Struggling TV producer Brad Brenner offers to make iCarly into a hit TV show after seeing how much his daughter loves watching their web show and refuses to watch his own unfunny shows. At first the TV reformat is great because Carly, Sam and Freddie get paid, ride in a limo and get a new band. They soon regret their arrangement after the first rehearsal when Brad changes the show around, trying to attract as many demographics as he can, and destroys everything good about it. First, Brad fits in Zeebo the dinosaur as a third co-host, only for Sam to attack him during filming, causing the actor portraying Zeebo to quit. Then, Brad fires Sam for being pushy and aggressive and replaces her with a stuck up and untalented movie actress named Amber Tate that Carly has no chemistry with, while removing the band entirely and forcing the band leader, Harper, to play Zeebo, which causes him to quit, too. Brad also makes Freddie do janitorial work and bathe Amber's dog when he was supposed to be a supervising producer, leading Freddie to quit. Elsewhere, with the gang at the TV studio, Spencer and Mrs. Benson try to fill the void by acting like a family to each other. In the end, after Carly has had enough of the changes, she tells Brad that the show is not even iCarly anymore and Brad agrees with her. Carly regains the rights to iCarly and restores it to the way it was. Brad puts the Zeebo character and Tate into another TV show, which performs terribly. Meanwhile, to celebrate the return of the real iCarly, Harper performs a song dedicated to their webcast.
24	24	"iWin a Date"	Steve Hoefer	Andrew Hill Newman	July 25, 2008	124	4.5
To help Gibby get a date with Shannon, who is much more interested in Freddie, Carly opens up a dating segment, which Shannon and her friends volunteer to star in as contestants. When only Shannon shows up, Carly steps in. She finds herself becoming the "lucky" sweetheart for Gibby. Carly sets Sam up with Gibby's friend Reuben, who likes Sam but bemuses her with his weird habit of talking in strange metaphors, and convinces Freddie to go with Shannon for a triple-date, and has Gibby act like Freddie to get Shannon interested in him. Gibby finally admits he is nothing like Freddie and reveals the "real Gibby" by taking off his shirt and dancing on a table. This has the effect of chasing off Shannon, but all turns out well when another girl tells Gibby she likes his moves. Meanwhile, Spencer tries posting various videos to a dating site to try to get a new date, but has a hard time finding what to post until he comes up with a 10-minute video of him just eating cereal, which gets him 9 responses, though he is unsure about accepting any of them when they turn out to be from a mixture of prisoners, ex-prisoners and psychologists.
25	25	"iHave a Lovesick Teacher"	Roger Christiansen	Ethan Banville	July 25, 2008	125	3.8
Ms. Lauren Ackerman, a history teacher at Ridgeway High School, becomes very sad and angry after her boyfriend breaks up with her and begins to take her anger out on her students. After Carly accidentally disrespects her while she is trying to defend Freddie, Spencer and Ackerman have a guardian-teacher conference, which ends up with Ackerman and Spencer dating. When Spencer starts to think Ackerman is not his type, he tries to break up with her, but she thinks they are still together. Carly tells Spencer to let her down easily. Spencer takes Carly's advice and breaks up with Ackerman, which causes her to become even more upset and go back to taking anger out on her students. When the break-up gets out of hand, the iCarly gang holds a segment in which the viewers vote to see whether Spencer and Ackerman should get back together or stay broken up; the latter becomes the most popular vote. However, the next day, when Ackerman is about to assign a lot of homework to her class, she is arrested by FBI agents for downloading over 500 illegal songs on a PearPod she got for Spencer, which she admitted on the webshow. After that, the rest of the class go on the ice skating trip Ackerman had promised them earlier.
