= List of iCarly characters =

The main characters iCarly (2007–2012) as of Season 4: (left to right) Gibby (Noah Munck), Spencer Shay (Jerry Trainor), Carly Shay (Miranda Cosgrove), Freddie Benson (Nathan Kress) and Sam Puckett (Jennette McCurdy).

The Nickelodeon sitcom iCarly (2007–2012) centers around Carly Shay, who creates her own web show with her best friends Sam and Freddie. The series stars Miranda Cosgrove as Carly, Jennette McCurdy as Sam, Nathan Kress as Freddie, Jerry Trainor as Spencer, and Noah Munck as Gibby. iCarly was created by Dan Schneider, who also served as executive producer. Two television films, iGo to Japan and iParty with Victorious, a crossover with Victorious, were released in 2008 and 2011 respectively. A joint spin-off with Victorious, titled Sam & Cat, starring McCurdy and Ariana Grande as Cat Valentine from Victorious, aired on Nickelodeon from 2013 to 2014.

In 2021, a revival of the series was released for Paramount+, with Cosgrove, Kress, and Trainor continuing their roles, and also starring Laci Mosley as Carly's best friend Harper and Jaidyn Triplett as Freddie's stepdaughter, Millicent. The series was developed by Ali Schouten without Schneider's involvement. Schouten also serves as executive producer alongside Cosgrove.

== Main characters ==
=== Overview ===
Actor	Character	iCarly							Sam & Cat	Revival series		
Actor	Character	1	2	3	4	iParty	5	6	1	1	2	3
Miranda Cosgrove	Carly Shay	Main	Main	Main	Main	Main	Main	Main		Main	Main	Main
Jennette McCurdy	Sam Puckett	Main	Main	Main	Main	Main	Main	Main	Main			
Nathan Kress	Freddie Benson	Main	Main	Main	Main	Main	Main	Main	Guest	Main	Main	Main
Jerry Trainor	Spencer Shay	Main	Main	Main	Main	Main	Main	Main		Main	Main	Main
Noah Munck	Gibby	Recurring	Recurring	Recurring	Main	Main	Main	Main	Guest			
Ariana Grande	Cat Valentine					Main			Main			
Laci Mosley	Harper									Main	Main	Main
Jaidyn Triplett	Millicent									Main	Main	Main

=== Carly Shay ===
Carly Shay (Miranda Cosgrove) starts as a 13-year-old girl who lives with her older brother, Spencer Shay, in Seattle, Washington. They live in the Bushwell Plaza apartment building.

In "iPilot", Carly takes the blame for one of Sam's pranks and has to oversee people who want to be in the school's talent show as punishment. When Carly, Sam, and Freddie's suggestions are completely ignored, they decide to make a web show named iCarly upon Freddie's suggestion, with the 'i' standing for 'Internet' and Carly's name since she will be the host of the show.

In the 2021 revival, it is revealed that Carly hosted QVC whilst in Italy and hosted college radio while studying theater and media studies. By the events of the reboot, she is sharing an apartment in Seattle with her new friend Harper. After failed attempts to start an Internet channel with romantic interests, she decides to restart her iCarly webshow, with Freddie and Spencer assisting her. Carly's relationship with Freddie develops more throughout the second season, to the point where they start to fall in love with each other again, something established in the season 2 finale and stated by Freddie's then-girlfriend, Pearl.

Carly and Freddie finally get together in the third season and it's revealed that she wants to marry him in "iGo to Toledo". In the ninth episode, Freddie believes Carly is pregnant with his child until she tells him that isn't true, although it implies they will have a family in the future. In the last episode, Carly and Freddie nearly get married after Marissa and Lewbert decide to elope, although the wedding is interrupted by Carly's mother, who arrives off-screen, leaving it on a cliffhanger.

=== Sam Puckett ===
Samantha "Sam" Puckett (Jennette McCurdy) is Carly's best friend and co-hosts the iCarly webshow with her. Sam has an identical twin sister named Melanie. Their mother is Pam Puckett (Jane Lynch).

In the series finale, "iGoodbye", Sam and Carly take a break from their web show while Carly moves to Italy. Sam becomes a lead character in the spin-off series Sam & Cat, in which she moves to Los Angeles and becomes friends with Cat Valentine (a character originally from Victorious) after rescuing her from a garbage truck.

In the 2021 revival, it is revealed that Sam had left Los Angeles and joined a biker gang that travels the country.

=== Freddie Benson ===
Fredward "Freddie" Benson (Nathan Kress) is the technical producer for the web-show iCarly. He is shown to have a crush for Carly that she is aware of but doesn't reciprocate. Sam tends to bully and berate him, although a romantic relationship develops in later seasons.

In the 2021 revival, it is revealed that in the eight and a half years since they were last together, Freddie had been involved in a failed tech start-up, had two failed marriages, and was forced to move back in with his mother along with his adopted stepdaughter Millicent. Freddie's relationship with Carly develops romantically again in season 2, to the point where they start to fall in love again, something established in the season 2 finale and established by Freddie's then-girlfriend, Pearl. Freddie becomes Carly's boyfriend in season 3 and she reveals she wants to marry him in "iGo to Toledo", when she says she hopes to one day be known as a Benson too. In the season 3 finale “iHave a Proposal”, on the day of Freddie’s mother, Marissa’s wedding to Lewbert, they decide to elope in Las Vegas, and Carly and Freddie decide to get married immediately, but before they do, Carly’s mother, off-screen, arrives, and the series ends on a cliffhanger.

=== Spencer Shay ===
Spencer Shay (Jerry Trainor) is Carly's older brother and legal guardian. Having stated his age to be 26 in “iWant More Viewers”, he was the only adult main character in the original series. When Carly's dad was called overseas, she went to live with Spencer, who turned their loft into both a workspace and gallery for his wacky sculptures. Spencer is off-beat but acts responsibly and seriously when necessary. Spencer has been shown as being extremely protective of Carly, especially in episodes such as "iQuit iCarly", "iLook Alike", and "iDate a Bad Boy".

In the 2021 revival, it is revealed that Spencer became a millionaire after one of his sculptures was accidentally set on fire and inadvertently seen by the art audience as a political statement. He has since remodeled his apartment, but kept the third floor intact, allowing Carly and Freddie to use it to restart their webshow. He also opened a restaurant on the former Groovy Smoothie location called Shay What. In the third season, it is revealed that he was a sperm donor and that he has 11 biological children.

=== Gibby ===
Orenthal Cornelius "Gibby" Gibson (Noah Munck) is a friend and classmate of Carly, Sam, and Freddie. Due to his odd personality and chubby appearance, he is an outcast at school, although he does have a few friends. He used to be known for taking off his shirt in almost all episodes he appeared in. After season 4, he has not taken his shirt off except for the episode "iRescue Carly", where he took it off in the dark. He stated in "iOpen a Restaurant" that he takes it off "less frequently now". He often appears on iCarly to assist Carly, Sam, and Freddie. Gibby started off as an occasional recurring character of the show, but started appearing more often in season 3 before officially getting promoted to a main character by season 4. Gibby has a little brother named Guppy, played by Munck's younger brother. A running gag in many episodes usually has many characters yelling "Gibby!" to him, either when they are aggravated or annoyed by him. Since becoming a series regular, Gibby often announces his presence upon entering a room by saying his own name in a deepened voice: "Gibbeh!" It was revealed in the episode, "iStill Psycho", that his birth name is Orenthal Gibson.

=== Harper ===
Harper Bettencourt (Laci Mosley) is Carly's new best friend and roommate. She is an aspiring fashion designer and works as a barista at Skybucks Coffee Bar after her family lost their fortune.

Following Mosley's casting in March 2021, Mosley has been the target of racist attacks from fans who saw her as a "replacement" for Jennette McCurdy's Sam Puckett. Writer Franchesca Ramsey tweeted in response, "[Mosley]'s character Harper isn't replacing Sam [McCurdy's character from the original].

=== Millicent ===
Millicent Mitchell (Jaidyn Triplett) is Freddie's snarky and social media-obsessed adopted stepdaughter. Freddie shares custody of her with her mother, Gwen.

== Recurring characters ==
=== Marissa Benson ===
Marissa Benson (Mary Scheer) is Freddie's neurotic and overbearing mother, first appearing in "iWanna Stay with Spencer". Marissa constantly worries about Freddie getting physically hurt (she couldn't care less about scarring him emotionally and/or mentally), or having relationships outside their immediate family (she winces at the mere mention of girls), and thinks nothing of treating her son like a Ming vase. She wanted Carly to love Freddie in "iWill Date Freddie", but later came to resent her for changing Freddie's "boy chemistry". Marissa shamelessly embarrasses Freddie in public, often by asking far-from-appropriate questions (like whether he's wearing clean underwear) and/or making him follow all of her strange rules.

In the revival, she bonds well with her adopted granddaughter Millicent. In season 3 Marissa becomes engaged to Lewbert.

=== Lewbert ===
Lewbert Sline (Jeremy Rowley) is the rude doorman of Carly's apartment. He has a large, noticeable wart on his left cheek. In "iFind Lewbert's Lost Love", he reveals that the wart developed from stress caused by his abusive ex-girlfriend, Marta.

In the 2021 revival, it is revealed that a month after Carly left for Italy, Lewbert had abruptly left the apartment building, and spent nine years trying to build a plan to get back at the iCarly gang by going to law school and becoming a lawyer in order to sue them for $2.4 million. In season 3, it showed that he is engaged to Mrs. Benson.

=== T-Bo ===
Terrence "T-Bo" Bo (BooG!e) is the manager at the Groovy Smoothie. He often hassles his customers to buy random foods on sticks, such as bagels, bell peppers, yams, doughnuts and pickles, alongside smoothies. These foods are always skewered on a stick. T-Bo says he has a degree in "Smoothieology". He is a close friend of Carly, Spencer, and the rest of the gang. T-Bo started living with Mrs. Benson after getting kicked out of the Groovy Smoothie.

=== Socko ===
Socko is Spencer's longtime friend since high school, who is mentioned in several episodes but never seen in person. He is known for making all of Spencer's brightly colored, light-up socks and has many relatives who all have names directly relating to their occupations, including a car salesman named Otto, a serial burglar named Rob, and a necktie designer named Tyler. He often commissions Spencer to make sculptures for his business.

=== Nevel Papperman ===
Nevel Amadeus Papperman (Reed Alexander) is a recurring villain in the iCarly series, running the popular review website Nevelocity.com, and tending to have a "posh" personality which includes outdated mannerisms, eloquent (though antiquated) speech and dressing formally all the time. First appearing in "iNevel", Nevel reveals to have a crush on Carly and initially offered to interview her in order to get close to her, but Carly resisted his romantic advances, eventually retaliating by angrily smearing tapenade on his face after he kissed her. He has since made it his goal to destroy the iCarly gang, although he claims to have a bigger goal of opening his own Haberdasher.

=== Chuck ===
Chuck Chambers (Ryan Ochoa) first made an appearance in "iHurt Lewbert", when playing racquetball in the lobby, which Spencer got him grounded by his father for two days. Later in the episode, when Spencer is out of earshot, he uses the CB radio that Spencer is using to upset two truckers and gives the truckers the location so that they can come and get Spencer (but Lewbert got his job back before the truckers could arrive). Since then, Chuck and Spencer became rivals and have clashed on several more occasions, usually ending with Spencer winning and Chuck getting punished by his father. In "iBattle Chip" Spencer called the cops on him and he went to military school. He later re-appears in the reboot series' second season's second episode "iObject, Lewbert!", where he commits perjury under the authorities' noses by falsely testifying against Carly and Spencer in court.

=== Guppy ===
Guppy Gibson (Ethan Munck) is Gibby's younger brother. He first appears in "iPsycho" when he visits Gibby, who is staying with Spencer and Carly. Guppy later frees the iCarly gang from a recording booth while Gibby distracts Nora, the girl who trapped the iCarly gang in the booth in her basement for over a day. Guppy is played by Noah Munck's real-life brother, Ethan.

=== Nora Dershlitt ===
Nora Dershlit (Danielle Morrow) is a lonely, dorky, yet criminally insane social outcast who is a crazy fan of iCarly and has no friends. In "iPsycho" the iCarly gang visit her for her birthday out of pity, but she locks them in her basement. In "iStill Psycho" she is released from prison and with the help of her parents captures them again. In the Sam and Cat spinoff she breaks out of prison and kidnaps Sam and Cat's friend in a parody of The Silence of the Lambs.

=== Charlotte ===
Charlotte Gibson (Deena Dill) is Gibby and Guppy's mother. She dates Spencer in "iFix a Pop Star", but he breaks up with her because he thinks she looks too much like her son Gibby, which makes her become aware of his resemblance to Carly.

=== Maeve ===
Maeve (Lyric Lewis) is Harper's cousin who disappeared for four years prior to the beginning of the revival series and had been presumed kidnapped. She resurfaces in the episode "iTake a Girl's Trip" to spend time with Harper. However, she meets Spencer and inadvertently upsets Harper by dating him and choosing to move into his apartment while she looks for a place of her own.

== Ridgeway Junior High School ==
=== Faculty ===
Principal Ted Franklin (Tim Russ) is the school principal, who is fond of Carly, Freddie and occasionally Sam. He is a nice principal that is generally well liked by the students.

Miss Francine Briggs (Mindy Sterling) is a mean English teacher that Carly and her friends like to tease. She is also one of Spencer's former teachers. Ironically, she became the reason why iCarly came to be.

Mr. Howard (David St. James) is a math teacher and detention moderator with an extremely unpleasant personality. He is a vindictive, hateful, perpetually angry person. Everyone at Ridgeway, including Carly and her friends as well as Principal Franklin, are shown to dislike him. He was shown teaching history in “iParty with Victorious”.

Mr. Devlin (Adrian Neil) is a honors history teacher of British descent at Ridgeway Middle School. He gave Carly’s “perfect” history report a B simply because it was printed on three-hole paper and once gave Spencer detention for playing with his fruit at lunch.

Miss Lauren Ackerman (Jessica Makinson) is an emotionally unstable, verbally abusive history teacher at Ridgeway. Carly was moved to her regular history class after the events of “iPromise Not to Tell”. She appears in the episode "iHave A Lovesick Teacher," where she dates Spencer. While dating Spencer, she is kind and giddy. When she has relationship issues, she unfairly punishes her class.

Mr. Stern (Joseph Buttler) is a teacher at Ridgeway Middle School. He is very strict and usually seen coming out of the teacher's lounge when there is an emergency.

Mr. Henning (Andrew Hill Newman) is a hippie science teacher at Ridgeway Middle School. Spencer inadvertently talked about him while talking about a science teacher he had that was supposedly “a freaky weirdo and smelled like rotting wood.”

Superintendent Harold Gorman (Weston Blakesley) is the Superintendent of Ridgeway Middle School and Principal Franklin's boss. He appeared in "iHave My Principals".

=== Students ===
Missy Robinson (Haley Ramm) was Carly's best friend, because both of their fathers were stationed at the same naval base at Seal Beach when they were seven, before Carly met Sam. She attempts to get Sam out of Carly's life so she can be her only best friend, but is unsuccessful.

Valerie (Carly Bondar) was Freddie's girlfriend in "iWill Date Freddie" but was actually using him as help in creating her own webshow so that it could overshadow iCarly.

Jeremy (Nathan Pearson) is a sickly boy who is known as "Germy" because he has been constantly sneezing and coughing since first grade. Like Freddie, he is also fascinated with electronics, and tech equipment. He appears only in the first season of the original series.

Wendy (Mary Ann Springer) is a close friend of the iCarly gang. She appears only in the first two seasons of the original series.

Wesley (Colin Spencer [Season 1], Victor Kelso [Season 4]) is one of Freddie's friends. He is a beatboxer. Wesley beatboxes so often that he is hardly ever seen speaking. His beatboxing has annoyed other characters (like Carly, Sam, and Mr. Howard) multiple times.

Ripoff Rodney (Christopher David III) is a student at Ridgeway who sells random items at high prices.

Duke Lubberman (Doug Brochu) is an aggressive student in Ridgeway who likes to wrestle.

Jocelyn (Cynthia Dallas) is a rude senior who appears in "iMake Sam Girlier". She is a bully in Ridgeway. She bullies Sam in "iMake Sam Girlier," and she tests her patience during her attempt to be more ladylike.

Jonah (Aaron Albert) is Sam's boyfriend in "iHate Sam's Boyfriend". He is Freddie's friend, and Freddie first introduces him to Sam. Carly, Freddie, and Spencer later find him annoying due to his interruptions of their webshow rehearsals and Spencer's claymation movie. Jonah is a bully, as he once talks about giving a nerd a wedgie. He is a cheater as well, as he attempts to be unfaithful during his relationship with Sam.

Jake Krandl (Austin Butler) is Carly's first love interest in "iLike Jake". Almost every other girl in Carly's school has a crush on Jake, though he has a girlfriend. When Carly invites Jake to sing on their web show, they learn that Jake has a horrible singing voice. He is also known to have a grandmother with one foot.

Magic Malika (Skyler Day) only appeared in "iSpeed Date" as a date for Freddie to the Girls' Choice dance. He didn't want to take her to the dance, but he didn't have any other choices. She has a very odd personality and is a skilled magician. Magic Malika annoys Freddie with her magic tricks.

Pete (Graham Patrick Martin) is Sam's love interest in "iMake Sam Girlier". He is a nice, easygoing guy that appreciates and is understanding of Sam's personality traits.

Shane (James Maslow) was a tech friend of Freddie as well as Carly and Sam's crush in "iSaw Him First". Carly and Sam both found him attractive and made a bet to determine which of them would date him. He is severely injured after accidentally falling down an elevator shaft, causing Carly and Sam to vow never to fight over a boy again.

Shannon Mitchell (Annamarie Kenoyer) was Gibby's crush in "iWin a Date". In turn, she had a major crush on Freddie, but Freddie wanted nothing to do with her.

Shawn (Matthew Moy) is a friend of Carly, Sam, and Freddie who is also part of the Mathletes club with Freddie in "iMeet Fred".

Simon Kendall (Simon Bernal) was a boy who could squirt milk out of his eye. He appeared in "iPilot" and "iCarly Awards".

Reuben (Gary Pease) was Gibby's best friend who had a crush on Sam since he first saw her. He almost always speaks using unusual metaphors that are difficult for other characters to understand.

== Minor characters ==
Officer Carl (Christopher Michael) is a police officer who appeared in "iWant More Viewers" and "iMove Out". He is shown to harbor ill will towards Spencer due to a mishap where a sign he created for iCarly short-circuited and read the phrase "Pee on Carl".

Aspartamay (Jack Black) is Spencer's online video game rival in "iStart a Fan War". He and Spencer come face-to-face at Webicon.

Pam Puckett (Jane Lynch) is the mother of Sam Puckett and her sister Melanie. Pam appears only in "iSam's Mom" and "iShock America P1. She was frequently mentioned by Sam throughout the first three seasons, but had never been seen in person.

Krustacia (Irina Voronina) is Spencer's date in the episode "iSell Penny Tees". She is a foreign woman from Uzbekistan. She speaks no English, so Spencer has to use hand motions to communicate with her.

Gordon Birch (J. D. Walsh) and Jodi Flooger (Rakefet Abergel) are a couple from Milwaukee, Wisconsin, who only appear in the episode "iDo". The iCarly gang helps the couple with Gordon's proposal and their wedding.

Jeb Birch (Joe Dietl) is the brother of Gordon Birch. He feels angry and jealous towards Freddie. This is due to Gordon choosing Freddie as his best man for his wedding instead of him.

Harper (Leon Thomas III) is the leader of the band that played in "iCarly Saves TV". He played the piano on the TV show and sang a song on guitar on the webshow.

Greg Horvath (Kevin Symons) is the CEO of the DAKA Shoe Company (also mentioned in Drake & Josh) in "iPromote Techfoots".

Mario (Jim Pirri) is an Italian immigrant who works at Galini's pie shop. His only appearance was in "iPie".

Trudy Galini (Wendy Haines) is the granddaughter of Mr. Galini, seen in the episode "iPie". She is very awkward, weird, and seems to lead a depressing life. Trudy has a major crush on Spencer. The iCarly gang wants Spencer to go on a date with her because they believe that she knows the secret recipe to Mr. Galini's pie.

Shelby Marx (Victoria Justice) appears only in "iFight Shelby Marx". She is the youngest champion in the CFC and becomes a friend of Carly, Sam and Freddie. She challenges Carly to a friendly exhibition boxing match, but is tricked by Nevel into going hard on her.

Ginger Fox (Betsy Rue) is an pop star who only appears in "iFix a Popstar". She is a parody of Britney Spears.

Shadow Hammer (Aaron Aguilera) is a criminal who appears in "iSam's Mom".

Chip Chambers (Jacob Bertrand) is the more menacing younger brother of Chuck Chambers.

Mrs. Papperman (Wendy Braun) is Nevel's mother. She is only seen in "iNevel," in which she forced Nevel to remove a bad review he wrote about iCarly.

The Dorfmans (Dalton O'Dell, Shane Partlow, Casey Williams, and Stephanie C. Allen) are Carly's dorky cousins whom she despises due to them being uncontrollably annoying.

Kyoko and Yuki (Ally Maki and Harry Shum, Jr.) are two Japanese webstars whom iCarly competed against in iGo to Japan. They attempted to ruin iCarly's chances of winning the iWeb Awards by stranding them in the middle of nowhere.

Mystery Girl is a little girl (Anna Clark) who appears in "iSpace Out". She arrives at Spencer and Carly's apartment while Carly is away at space camp. Spencer wonders if she is real or an illusion.

Gunsmoke (Anthony Vitale) is a bodyguard who appears in "iSam's Mom". Mrs. Benson hires him to protect Freddie when she worries about the Shadow Hammer hurting him. He served in three military wars and has a hole in his leg the size of his thumbnail. His name is taken from the Western drama series of the same name.

Marta Trundel (Kit Pongetti) is Lewbert's former girlfriend. Carly, Sam, and Freddie try to reunite Marta and Lewbert to put an end to Lewbert's attitude in "iFind Lewbert's Lost Love", only to find out that he broke up with her due to her abusive and obsessive behavior.

Wade Collins (Alex Schemmer) is a British-Canadian aspiring singer whom the iCarly gang volunteer to boost his career after they unintentionally sabotage his chances on America Sings. Off-camera, he is shown to be obnoxious, rude and short-tempered, even lying about his mother needing surgery to gain sympathy from the public. He frequently refers to Americans as "hobknockers".

Doug Toder (Daniel Samonas) is Spencer's old archrival who only appears in "iFence". He challenged Freddie to a fencing competition, only to be beaten by him and Ms. Benson.

Veronica (Valerie Azlynn) was Spencer's date in "iMake Sam Girlier", but their relationship happened only because she liked his tuxedo. She returns in "iEnrage Gibby", to express condolence when she thinks Spencer is dead.

Detective Stuart 'Spanky' Stimbler (Ryan Bollman) is a childhood bully of Spencer who only appears in "iStakeout". His nickname "Spanky" refers to the fact that he likes to spank unsuspecting people as a joke.

Tasha (Emily Ratajkowski) is Gibby's girlfriend. She had a minor role in "iSpeed Date" and a major role in "iEnrage Gibby". Multiple characters are surprised that she and Gibby are dating.+

Harry Joyner (Oliver Muirhead) is Spencer's idol who influenced his art and appears in "iHeart Art". Upon meeting Spencer and his work for the first time, he tells him that he doesn't like his sculptures which depresses Spencer and causes him to give up on his art. He later admits that he was jealous of his work, and he and Spencer team up to make a sculpture for the Dentist office he temporarily worked at.

Amber Tate (Rachel G. Fox) is a spoiled child actress that appears in "iCarly Saves TV", in which she is rude to the iCarly gang. She has a small dog who frequently vomits.

Granddad Shay (Greg Mullavey) is a lawyer and Carly and Spencer's paternal grandfather who lives in Yakima, Washington. In his debut episode, "iWanna Stay With Spencer", he tries to take Carly away from him on the grounds that he is not mature or responsible enough to take care of her before ultimately changing his mind last minute.

Col. Steven Shay (David Chisum) is Carly and Spencer's father who is a Colonel in the United States Air Force. He has appeared in a few episodes, but has mostly been stationed on a base in Italy. In the final episode, Carly left Seattle to stay with him in Italy.

Amanda "Mandy" Valdez (Aria Wallace) is an obsessed fan of iCarly and only appears in "iAm Your Biggest Fan" and "iWant My Website Back".

Griffin (Drew Roy) is a bad boy that Carly dates in "iDate a Bad Boy". He steals Spencer's motorcycle, and upon being arrested, refuses to press charges and takes him under his wing in an attempt to reform him. Carly ends up breaking up with him after learning he collects Pee Wee Babies.

Sasha Striker (Lorena York) is the world's best Pak-Rat (parody of Pac-Man) player who appeared in "iStage an Intervention".

Jackson Colt (Terrell Lee) is a top 10 MMA fighter who appears only in "iLook Alike".

Hazel (Sherry Weston) is an elderly woman that assists Gibby in retrieving a five-dollar bill from a Tree in "iDo". Despite promising to get coffee with her afterwards, he takes off with the bill after she falls down.

Cal (Jake Siegel) was Carly's assistant in "iGo Nuclear". He was helping her with a school science project for her teacher, Mr. Henning. Cal was actually a criminal because he had a history of building illegal nuclear projects using black market uranium.

Mitch (Danny Woodburn) appears in "iChristmas". He is the guardian angel who granted Carly's wish for Spencer to become normal. He teaches Carly a valuable lesson in an attempt to gain his wings, which turns out to be chicken wings.

Melanie Puckett (Jennette McCurdy) is Sam's identical twin sister who appears in "iTwins". According to Sam, she is a straight "A" student, follows all the rules, and goes to a fancy boarding school in Blandale, Vermont.

Fleck and Dave (Daven Wilson and Joey Luthman) are two teenage boys who cohost a web show and appear in "iQuit iCarly". The two are good friends but have very different opinions on how the show itself is written. A breakup between them inadvertently causes a temporary breakup between Carly and Sam.

Cort and Ashley (Daniel Booko and Teresa Castillo) are two teenagers hired as interns in the episode "iHire An Idiot".

Steven Carson (Cameron Stewart) is Carly and Tori's ex-boyfriend on "iParty with Victorious".

Adam (Max Ehrich) is Carly's love interest in "iStart a Fanwar." He attendeds Webicon in the episode. He is upset with the rumors that Carly and Freddie are dating by the shippers.

Goopy Gilbert (Jeremy Dozier) is an extreme Seddie fan best known for shouting "SEDDIE!" He is first seen in "iStart a Fanwar" as a Seddier in the crowd. In "iLost My Mind", he is the second video chatter debating whether or not Sam and Freddie should be together.

Ricky Flame (Al Espinosa) is a celebrity chef who appeared in "iCook". He is obsessed with winning and experiences his first loss on a broadcast of iCarly, which puts him into a deep depression. He later enrolls in a children's wrestling program to relive the thrill of winning.

LeAnne Carter (Gilland Jones) is Sam's former rival when they competed in beauty pageants. She has won many beauty pageants. Despite Sam disliking her, LeAnne is actually kind to Sam and others.

Emily (Piper Mackenzie Harris) is a little girl and a Sunshine Girl scout. She is extremely shy. Spencer offers to help her sell fudgeballs so she can win a bicycle. Spencer does this partially so he can get closer to her single mother.

Roy (Malcolm Devine) is a security guard working for the Seattle Museum of Art. In "iHire an Idiot," Roy kicks Spencer out of the museum since he snuck his sculpture inside. Spencer then has Gibby distract Roy so that he can sneak his sculpture back into the museum for display.

== Guest appearances ==
Role	Played By	Season	Episode	Date
Director	Adam Weissman	1	2: iWant More Viewers; 5: iWanna Stay With Spencer	Sept. 8, 2007; Sept. 29, 2007
Jake	Austin Butler	1	4: iLike Jake	Sept. 22, 2007
Director	Steve Hoefer	1	6: iNevel; 8: iSpy a Mean Teacher	Oct. 6, 2007; Oct. 27, 2007
Valerie	Carly Bondar	1	9: iWill Date Freddie	Nov. 3, 2007
as Themselves	Plain White T's	1	11: iRue the Day	Dec. 1, 2007
Director	David Kendall	1	21: iMight Switch Schools	Apr. 26, 2008
Shane	James Maslow	2	1: iSaw Him First	Sept. 27, 2008
Chuck Chambers	Ryan Ochoa	2	4: iHurt Lewbert	Oct. 18, 2008
as Themselves	Good Charlotte	2	5: iGo To Japan	Nov. 8, 2008
as himself	David Archuleta	2	10: iRocked the Vote	Feb. 7, 2009
as himself/Fred Figglehorn	Lucas Cruikshank	2	11: iMeet Fred	Feb. 16, 2009
Shelby Marx	Victoria Justice	2	21: iFight Shelby Marx	Aug. 8, 2009
Superintendent Gorman	Weston Blakesely	3	5: iHave My Principals	Oct. 17, 2009
Pam Puckett	Jane Lynch	4	2: iSam's Mom	Sept. 11, 2010
Aspartamay	Jack Black	4	6: iStart a Fan War	Nov. 19, 2010
Tori Vega	Victoria Justice	4	10: iParty with Victorious	Jun, 11, 2011
Robbie Shapiro	Matt Bennett	4	10: iParty with Victorious	Jun 11, 2011
Andre Harris	Leon Thomas III	4	10: iParty with Victorious	Jun 11, 2011
Cat Valentine	Ariana Grande	4	10: iParty with Victorious	Jun 11, 2011
Trina Vega	Daniella Monet	4	10: iParty with Victorious	Jun 11, 2011
Jade West	Elizabeth Gillies	4	10: iParty with Victorious	Jun 11, 2011
Beck Oliver	Avan Jogia	4	10: iParty with Victorious	Jun 11, 2011
Himself	Kenan Thompson	4	10: iParty with Victorious	Jun 11, 2011
Caleb	Jim Parsons	5	1: iLost My Mind	Aug. 13, 2011
Secret Service Agent	Dan Schneider	5	9: iMeet The First Lady	Jan. 16, 2012
As Herself	Michelle Obama	5	9: iMeet The First Lady	Jan. 16, 2012
Secret Service Agent	Taran Killam	5	9: iMeet The First Lady	Jan. 16, 2012
As Themselves	One Direction	6	2: iGo One Direction	Apr. 7, 2012
Himself	Jimmy Fallon	6	7: iShock America	Oct. 6, 2012
Heather	Emma Stone	6	9: iFind Spencer Friends	Oct. 20, 2012
Colonel Steven Shay	David Chisum	6	13: iGoodbye	Nov. 23, 2012
Motorcycle mechanic	Dan Schneider	6	13: iGoodbye	Nov. 23, 2012
