= List of iCarly episodes =

iCarly is an American sitcom that originally aired on Nickelodeon from September 8, 2007, to November 23, 2012. The series stars Miranda Cosgrove as Carly Shay who becomes an Internet star. Nickelodeon promoted many episodes such as "iDo", "iHire an Idiot", "iPity the Nevel", "iDate Sam & Freddie", etc. as specials, despite being regular episodes. The lower case i which begins the episode titles represents the internet, as in "iCarly". The show was nominated for an Emmy award for Outstanding Children's Program in 2009. The series ended on November 23, 2012, with the one-hour special episode "iGoodbye". A total of six seasons and 109 episodes were produced, broadcast as 97 aired episodes. The largest audience of the series was 11.2 million viewers, with the special episode "iSaved Your Life" premiered in January 2010.

When Carly (Miranda Cosgrove) and her sassy best friend Sam (Jennette McCurdy) act funny at a school talent show audition, tech-savvy Freddie (Nathan Kress) tapes it and posts it online without telling them. After seeing the girls' strong chemistry and banter, the online audience clamors for more and the iCarly webcast is born. The trio find their normal adolescent lives thrown for a loop when they discover that they have become online celebrities as their show – which features talent contests, recipes, problem-solving, and random dancing – garners international accolades.

Carly lives in Seattle, Washington with her older brother and guardian Spencer (Jerry Trainor) and produces the show in a makeshift third-floor studio loft in their apartment. Their mother has never been seen or mentioned, but their father, Steven Shay (David Chisum), is a United States Air Force officer temporarily stationed on a submarine, and is often mentioned but is briefly seen in person during the series finale episode, "iGoodbye".

== Series overview ==
Season	Episodes		Originally released	
Season	Episodes		First released	Last released
1	25		September 8, 2007	July 25, 2008
2	21		September 27, 2008	August 8, 2009
3	18		September 12, 2009	June 26, 2010
4	10		July 30, 2010	June 11, 2011
5	10		August 13, 2011	January 21, 2012
6	13	6	March 24, 2012	June 9, 2012
6	13	7	October 6, 2012	November 23, 2012

== Episodes ==
=== Season 1 (2007–08) ===
No. overall	No. in season	Title	Directed by	Written by	Original release date	Prod. code	U.S. viewers (millions)
1	1	"iPilot"	Steve Hoefer	Dan Schneider	September 8, 2007	101	4.1
2	2	"iWant More Viewers"	Adam Weissman	Steve Holland & Steven Molaro	September 8, 2007	103	3.9
3	3	"iDream of Dance"	Adam Weissman	Dan Schneider	September 16, 2007	113	3.5
4	4	"iLike Jake"	Steve Hoefer	Dan Schneider	September 22, 2007	102	3.5
5	5	"iWanna Stay with Spencer"	Adam Weissman	Arthur Gradstein	September 29, 2007	105	N/A
6	6	"iNevel"	Steve Hoefer	Steve Holland	October 6, 2007	104	3.6
7	7	"iScream on Halloween"	Steve Hoefer	Jake Farrow	October 20, 2007	114	N/A
8	8	"iSpy a Mean Teacher"	Steve Hoefer	Steven Molaro	November 3, 2007	106	N/A
9	9	"iWill Date Freddie"	Adam Weissman	Steve Holland	November 10, 2007	108	N/A
10	10	"iWant a World Record"	Roger Christiansen	Dan Schneider	November 17, 2007	107	N/A
11	11	"iRue the Day"	David Kendall	Dan Schneider	December 1, 2007	115	N/A
12	12	"iPromise Not to Tell"	Steve Hoefer	Dicky Murphy	January 12, 2008	118	3.9
13	13	"iAm Your Biggest Fan"	Steve Hoefer	Jake Farrow	January 19, 2008	110	N/A
14	14	"iHeart Art"	Adam Weissman	Arthur Gradstein	February 2, 2008	109	3.6
15	15	"iHate Sam's Boyfriend"	Roger Christiansen	Dan Schneider	February 9, 2008	120	3.5
16	16	"iHatch Chicks"	David Kendall	Steven Molaro	February 23, 2008	111	4.2
17	17	"iDon't Want to Fight"	Roger Christiansen	Arthur Gradstein	March 1, 2008	112	4.5
18	18	"iPromote Techfoots"	Adam Weissman	Arthur Gradstein	March 15, 2008	117	4.3
19	19	"iGot Detention"	Roger Christiansen	Andrew Hill Newman	March 22, 2008	116	3.7
20	20	"iStakeout"	Steve Hoefer	Andrew Hill Newman	April 5, 2008	121	4.1
21	21	"iMight Switch Schools"	David Kendall	Dicky Murphy	April 26, 2008	122	3.3
22	22	"iFence"	Russ Reinsel	Dan Schneider	May 10, 2008	123	3.5
23	23	"iCarly Saves TV"	Steve Hoefer	Jake Farrow	June 13, 2008	119	4.5
24	24	"iWin a Date"	Steve Hoefer	Andrew Hill Newman	July 25, 2008	124	4.5
25	25	"iHave a Lovesick Teacher"	Roger Christiansen	Ethan Banville	July 25, 2008	125	3.8

=== Season 2 (2008–09) ===
No. overall	No. in season	Title	Directed by	Written by	Original release date	Prod. code	U.S. viewers (millions)
26	1	"iSaw Him First"	Adam Weissman	Teleplay by : Andrew Hill Newman; Story by : Steven Molaro	September 27, 2008	204	N/A
27	2	"iStage an Intervention"	Jonathan Goldstein	Karey Dornetto	October 4, 2008	205	N/A
28	3	"iOwe You"	David Kendall	Jake Farrow	October 11, 2008	206	N/A
29	4	"iHurt Lewbert"	Russ Reinsel	Ethan Banville	October 18, 2008	207	4.37
30	5	"iGo to Japan"	Steve Hoefer	Teleplay by : Dan Schneider; Story by : Andrew Hill Newman	November 8, 2008	201–203	7.59
31	6	"iPie"	Roger Christiansen	Andrew Hill Newman	November 15, 2008	208	4.10
32	7	"iChristmas"	Steve Hoefer	Dan Schneider	December 13, 2008	209	3.70
33	8	"iKiss"	Steve Hoefer	Dan Schneider	January 3, 2009	210	5.94
34	9	"iGive Away a Car"	Steve Hoefer	George Doty IV	January 17, 2009	211	5.10
35	10	"iRocked the Vote"	Russ Reinsel	Andrew Hill Newman	February 7, 2009	215	5.23
36	11	"iMeet Fred"	Adam Weissman	Dan Schneider	February 16, 2009	212	5.10
37	12	"iLook Alike"	David Kendall	Dan Schneider	March 7, 2009	213	6.29
38	13	"iWant My Website Back"	Adam Weissman	Matt Fleckenstein	March 21, 2009	219	3.90
39	14	"iMake Sam Girlier"	Roger Christiansen	Jake Farrow	April 11, 2009	216	5.13
40	15	"iGo Nuclear"	David Kendall	George Doty IV & Andrew Hill Newman	April 22, 2009	214	4.50
41	16	"iDate a Bad Boy"	Steve Hoefer	Dan Schneider	May 9, 2009	217 / 225	6.47
42	17	"iReunite with Missy"	Adam Weissman	Jake Farrow	May 16, 2009	218	4.30
43	18	"iTake on Dingo"	David Kendall	Jake Farrow	June 13, 2009	226	3.40
44	19	"iMust Have Locker 239"	David Kendall	Eric Goldberg & Peter Tibbals	June 27, 2009	220	3.98
45	20	"iTwins"	Russ Reinsel	Eric Goldberg & Peter Tibbals	July 11, 2009	224	5.22
46	21	"iFight Shelby Marx"	Steve Hoefer	Dan Schneider	August 8, 2009	221–222	7.86

=== Season 3 (2009–10) ===
No. overall	No. in season	Title	Directed by	Written by	Original release date	Prod. code (Note: As a result of this season being part of the second season production count, this set of episodes maintains their Season 2 production codes.)	U.S. viewers (millions)
47	1	"iThink They Kissed"	Adam Weissman	Steve Holland	September 12, 2009	227	7.6
48	2	"iCook"	Roger Christiansen	Dan Schneider	September 19, 2009	228	3.8
49	3	"iSpeed Date"	Russ Reinsel	Andrew Hill Newman	September 26, 2009	230	4.7
50	4	"iCarly Awards"	Steve Hoefer	Andrew Hill Newman	October 3, 2009	223	4.4
51	5	"iHave My Principals"	David Kendall	Matt Fleckenstein	October 17, 2009	229	4.7
52	6	"iFind Lewbert's Lost Love"	David Kendall	Matt Fleckenstein	November 14, 2009	236	5.0
53	7	"iMove Out"	Steve Hoefer	Arthur Gradstein	November 28, 2009	241	5.7
54	8	"iQuit iCarly"	Steve Hoefer	Dan Schneider	December 5, 2009	233–234	8.8
55	9	"iSaved Your Life"	Larry LaFond	Eric Goldberg & Peter Tibbals	January 18, 2010 (original); February 12, 2010 (extended) (Note: On February 12 and 13, Nickelodeon aired an extended version of the episode, which includes seven minutes of scenes cut from the original episode.)	232	11.2 (original); 4.1 (extended)
56	10	"iWas a Pageant Girl"	Adam Weissman	Andrew Hill Newman	January 29, 2010	237	5.2
57	11	"iEnrage Gibby"	Jonathan Goldstein	Jake Farrow	February 5, 2010	235	4.8
58	12	"iSpace Out"	Russ Reinsel	Jake Farrow	March 5, 2010	239	5.3
59	13	"iFix a Pop Star"	Steve Hoefer	Matt Fleckenstein	March 19, 2010	231	3.8
60	14	"iBloop"	Steve Hoefer	Dan Schneider	April 17, 2010	245	4.3
61	15	"iWon't Cancel the Show"	Steve Hoefer	Eric Goldberg & Peter Tibbals	May 1, 2010	238	4.9
62	16	"iBelieve in Bigfoot"	Steve Hoefer	Dan Schneider	May 8, 2010	240	4.4
63	17	"iPsycho"	Steve Hoefer	Dan Schneider & Ben Huebscher	June 4, 2010	243–244	7.5
64	18	"iBeat the Heat"	Steve Hoefer	Steve Holland	June 26, 2010	242	4.2

=== Season 4 (2010–11) ===
No. overall	No. in season	Title	Directed by	Written by	Original release date	Prod. code	U.S. viewers (millions)
65	1	"iGot a Hot Room"	Steve Hoefer	Dan Schneider	July 30, 2010	301	7.7
66	2	"iSam's Mom"	Adam Weissman	Jake Farrow	September 11, 2010	305	5.9
67	3	"iGet Pranky"	Adam Weissman	Arthur Gradstein	September 25, 2010	304	5.2
68	4	"iSell Penny Tees"	Russ Reinsel	Matt Fleckenstein	October 2, 2010	303	4.0
69	5	"iDo"	Steve Hoefer	Jake Farrow	October 11, 2010	302	6.7
70	6	"iStart a Fan War"	Steve Hoefer	Dan Schneider	November 19, 2010	308–309	5.0
71	7	"iHire an Idiot"	Clayton Boen	Arthur Gradstein	February 12, 2011	307	4.9
72	8	"iPity the Nevel"	Russ Reinsel	Matt Fleckenstein	March 19, 2011	306	4.6
73	9	"iOMG"	Adam Weissman	Dan Schneider	April 9, 2011	310	8.8
74	10	"iParty with Victorious"	Steve Hoefer	Dan Schneider	June 11, 2011 (original); August 27, 2011 (extended)	311–313	7.3 (original); 3.7 (extended)

=== Season 5 (2011–12) ===
No. overall	No. in season	Title	Directed by	Written by	Original release date	Prod. code	U.S. viewers (millions)
75	1	"iLost My Mind"	Steve Hoefer	Dan Schneider & Matt Fleckenstein	August 13, 2011	402	5.51
76	2	"iDate Sam & Freddie"	Steve Hoefer	Dan Schneider & Jake Farrow	September 10, 2011	401	4.10
77	3	"iCan't Take It"	Adam Weissman	Dan Schneider & Arthur Gradstein	September 17, 2011	403	4.75
78	4	"iLove You"	Steve Hoefer	Dan Schneider & Jake Farrow	September 24, 2011	404	3.45
79	5	"iQ"	David Kendall	Dan Schneider & Matt Fleckenstein	October 1, 2011	405	3.83
80	6	"iBloop 2: Electric Bloopaloo"	Clayton Boen	Dan Schneider & Matt Fleckenstein	December 28, 2011	411	3.09
81	7	"iStill Psycho"	David Kendall	Dan Schneider & Jake Farrow	December 31, 2011	407–408	5.50
82	8	"iBalls"	Russ Reinsel	Dan Schneider & Ben Huebscher	January 7, 2012	410	4.14
83	9	"iMeet the First Lady"	Adam Weissman	Dan Schneider & Arthur Gradstein	January 16, 2012	406	4.26
84	10	"iToe Fat Cakes"	Russ Reinsel	Dan Schneider & Matt Fleckenstein	January 21, 2012	409	4.84

=== Season 6 (2012) ===
No. overall	No. in season	Title	Directed by	Written by	Original release date	Prod. code	U.S. viewers (millions)
Part 1 (Note: While these thirteen episodes were produced in a single production season, Nickelodeon advertised "iShock America" (i.e. the first episode of "Part 2") as the start of the "final season".)
85	1	"iApril Fools"	Jerry Trainor	Dan Schneider & George Doty IV	March 24, 2012	503	3.4
86	2	"iGo One Direction"	Steve Hoefer	Dan Schneider & George Doty IV	April 7, 2012	501	3.9
87	3	"iOpen a Restaurant"	Steve Hoefer	Dan Schneider & Jake Farrow	April 21, 2012	502	2.8
88	4	"iHalfoween"	Adam Weissman	Dan Schneider & Ben Dougan	April 28, 2012	505	2.9
89	5	"iPear Store"	David Kendall	Dan Schneider & Jake Farrow	May 12, 2012	504	2.8
90	6	"iBattle Chip"	Adam Weissman	Dan Schneider & Jake Farrow	June 9, 2012	506	2.4
Part 2
91	7	"iShock America"	Steve Hoefer	Dan Schneider	October 6, 2012	510–511	3.6
92	8	"iGet Banned"	David Kendall	Dan Schneider & Jake Farrow	October 13, 2012	507	3.6
93	9	"iFind Spencer Friends"	Russ Reinsel	Jake Farrow	October 20, 2012	512	3.3
94	10	"iRescue Carly"	Steve Hoefer	Dan Schneider & Matt Fleckenstein	October 27, 2012	509	3.3
95	11	"iLost My Head in Vegas"	Jerry Trainor	Dan Schneider & Jake Farrow	November 3, 2012	508	3.5
96	12	"iBust a Thief"	Steve Hoefer	Matt Fleckenstein	November 10, 2012	513	3.4
97	13	"iGoodbye"	Steve Hoefer	Dan Schneider	November 23, 2012	514–515	6.4
