= Sam Puckett =

Sam Puckett may refer to:

- Sam Puckett (iCarly), a fictional character on the Nickelodeon television series iCarly
- Sam Puckett (Sam & Cat), the same character as she appears on the Nickelodeon television series Sam & Cat
