= IGo to Japan =

2008 three-part episode of iCarly directed by Steve Hoefer

iGo to Japan
- iCarly episode
- Episode no.: Season 2 Episode 5
- Directed by: Steve Hoefer
- Story by: Andrew Hill Newman
- Teleplay by: Dan Schneider
- Original air date: November 8, 2008
- Running time: 71 minutes

Starring
- Miranda Cosgrove; Jennette McCurdy; Nathan Kress; Jerry Trainor; Mary Scheer

Episode chronology
| ← Previous "iHurt Lewbert" | Next → "iPie" |
- ICarly season 2

iGo to Japan is a 2008 live-action comedy adventure television film that is based on Dan Schneider's Nickelodeon TV series iCarly. It serves as the fifth episode of the second season of the show. It premiered on November 8, 2008, on Nickelodeon, and November 21 on YTV. The television movie stars Miranda Cosgrove, Jennette McCurdy, Nathan Kress, Jerry Trainor, and Mary Scheer. The film was directed by Steve Hoefer. Production began in early 2008 and lasted 4 to 5 weeks.

== Plot ==
=== Part 1 ===
The iCarly gang are invited to Tokyo after being nominated for the annual iWeb Awards, where in order to qualify they will be expected to perform a skit live on stage. Prior to their trip, they create a sketch called Melanie Higgles: Space Cheerleader to compete in the show.

They receive three first-class tickets. Freddie's mother, Marissa, initially refuses to allow Freddie to go on the trip even after Spencer volunteers to chaperone the kids. She agrees instead to come along, despite Sam's initial objections. Since they do not have enough airline tickets for five people, Spencer trades the three first-class tickets for five lower-class ones. However, he subsequently calls in a favor from his best friend, Socko, which results in the team riding to Japan aboard his friend Freight Dog's unsanitary, possum-filled cargo airplane bound for Korea. To their horror, they realize they must skydive into Tokyo.

=== Part 2 ===
The group winds up landing in a deserted area, but are found by a Japanese policeman who brings them safely to a local hotel. After checking in and sleeping off their jet lag, which lasts into the next day, they are visited by Kyoko and Yûki, the stars of a competing webshow. The duo give Spencer and Marissa free passes to a Nakamura Spa where their cousins work and take Carly, Sam and Freddie shopping.

As generous as their gestures seem, Kyoko and Yûki have their minds set on sabotaging any chance that iCarly has of winning the iWeb Awards. They purposely fight over and over again for directions until Yûki "admits" they are lost. As night falls, they take Carly, Sam and Freddie to the middle of nowhere on a highway outside Tokyo and drive off after staging a kung-fu fight. Meanwhile, Spencer and Marissa find themselves bound to their massage tables by seaweed naked, a problem rectified by Spencer eating his way out and then freeing Marissa.

=== Part 3 ===
Marissa locates the lost iCarly gang on a locator chip she had secretly put in Freddie's head.

Eventually, the gang reunites and are able to get to the iWeb Awards show, only to be prevented from entering the studio because the security guards cannot speak a word of English, the gang tearfully gives up, but Marissa distracts the guards and the kids and Spencer get in, only to be quickly apprehended by the guards. The guards place them in a utility room and Carly and Sam try to communicate with them by acting out what happened to them during their trip. Freddie cleverly videotapes them and plugs his camcorder into the stage's jumbotron. Unbeknownst to the girls, their manic performance is being broadcast to the audience, completely overshadowing Kyoko and Yûki's, as well as exposing their crimes. They are saved by Theodore Wilkins, the British man who invited them, who in fluent Japanese, informs mainly the chief of security that they were supposed to be on the show.

iCarly wins the award for best comedy, though Carly and Sam have no idea how they won until Freddie explains what he did, while Kyoko and Yûki are arrested. The iCarly gang, along with Spencer and Marissa, return to America on a fishing boat, much to their dismay. Since Spencer believed that the Japanese soap was candy, they put some in their mouths before spitting it out in disgust.

== Cast ==
- Miranda Cosgrove as Carly Shay: Star of iCarly and Spencer's younger sister.
- Jennette McCurdy as Sam Puckett: Co-host of iCarly and Carly's delinquent sidekick and troublemaking best friend.
- Nathan Kress as Freddie Benson: Technical producer and director of iCarly. He is also the techy, geeky neighbor of Carly and Spencer.
- Jerry Trainor as Spencer Shay: Carly's older brother and a skilled artist. He is also Carly's legal guardian. In the film, he tries to learn Japanese but every time he gets something wrong, a magnetic collar he wears shocks him.
- Mary Scheer as Marissa Benson: Freddie's mother. In the film, she, along with Spencer, is trapped in seaweed while getting a massage.
- Ally Matsumura as Kyoko: The star of a competing webshow from Japan.
- Harry Shum Jr. as Yûki: Another star of a competing webshow from Japan.
- Jonathan Mangum as Henri P'Twa: a webshow host from France who also competes.
- Michael Butler Murray as Theodore Wilkins: The chairman of the iWeb Awards. He speaks English and Japanese.
- Don Stark as Freight Dog: A man who flies the gang to Japan on his cargo plane with many possums bound for Korea.
- Andrew Kishino as Japanese Voice
- Jeremy Rowley as Lewbert: The obnoxious doorman of Bushwell Plaza in Seattle, Washington.
- Good Charlotte as themselves: They perform as guests at the iWeb Awards.

== Reception ==
The movie special received some positive notice. Verne Gay of Newsday rated it a 'B−', stating that "It's not deep, unless you consider a puddle deep, but there's some charm here. Kids will like it. A lot.”

== Nielsen ratings ==
| Network | Date | Viewers |
|---|---|---|
| Nickelodeon | November 8, 2008 | 7.6 Million |
| Nickelodeon | November 10, 2008 | 5.02 Million |
| YTV | November 21, 2008 | 3.32 Million |
| Nick UK | April 4, 2009 | 0.226 Million |
| Nick Germany | October 17, 2009 | 0.220 Million |
