= Ryan Ochoa =

American actor

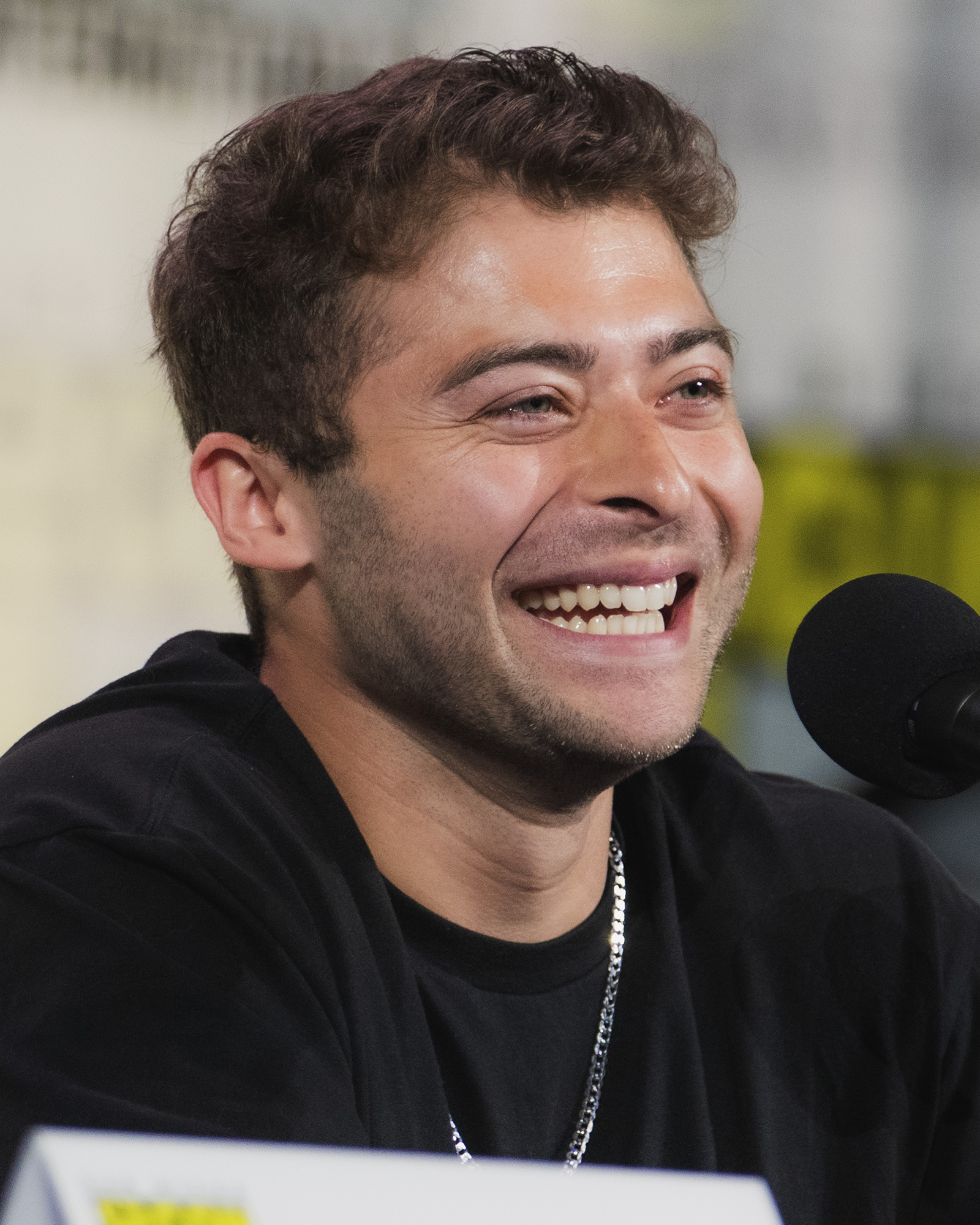
- Ochoa in 2026
- Born: May 17, 1996 (age 30); San Diego, California, U.S.
- Occupation: Actor
- Years active: 2005–present
- Relatives: Raymond Ochoa (brother)
- Musical career
- Genres: Hip-hop, teen pop
- Instrument: Vocals
- Member of: Ochoa Boyz

Ryan Ochoa (born May 17, 1996) is an American actor. He is known for playing the role of Lanny on the Disney XD series Pair of Kings, and for his recurring role as Chuck Chambers on the Nickelodeon series iCarly.

== Early life ==
Ryan Ochoa was born in San Diego, California. His ancestry includes Mexican, Filipino, Italian, Irish, and Russian-Jewish. He has four siblings, including younger brother Raymond Ochoa.

== Career ==
=== Acting career ===
Ochoa had his first professional acting job at the age of eight, when he was cast in a national Dairy Queen commercial.

Ryan's film debut was in the 2007 film Nostalgia as Ryan Zorn, the son of the main character. He appeared in the 2009 film The Perfect Game as Norberto, one of the 9 baseball players. He also played Tiny Tim in 2009's A Christmas Carol. Ochoa played the voice of the character of Rick in the 2009 animated film Astro Boy.

Ochoa has appeared in the television show, iCarly, in the episodes "iHurt Lewbert", "iReunite with Missy", "iTwins", "iFind Lewbert's Lost Love", "iBloop", and "iBeat the Heat". He reprised his role in the 2021 revival series.

In 2011, Ochoa appeared in Disney's Friends for Change. He co-starred as Lanny in the Disney XD series Pair of Kings, and as Max Doyle in the direct-to-video film Mostly Ghostly: Have You Met My Ghoulfriend?.

=== Musical career ===
Since 2012, Ochoa and his brothers have performed in the musical group Ochoa Boyz.

== Filmography ==
=== Film ===
Year	Title	Role	Notes
2007	Nostalgia	Ryan Zorn	
2008	Mother Goose Parade	N/A	
2009	A Christmas Carol	Tiny Tim (voice) / Various voices	
2009	Astro Boy	Rick (voice)	
2009	The Perfect Game	Norberto Villarreal	
2011	Mars Needs Moms	Hatchling (voice)	
2014	Mostly Ghostly: Have You Met My Ghoulfriend?	Max Doyle	Direct-to-video
2018	The Samuel Project	Eli	
2019	Room for Rent	Wayne	
TBA	Del Playa	Tim	Completed
TBA	Second Chances	Nick Stone	Completed; co- writer
TBA	Concert Heroes		

=== Television ===
Year	Title	Role	Notes
2008–2009	The Jay Leno Show	Various roles	
2008–2010	iCarly	Chuck	Recurring role; 5 episodes
2010	Batman: The Brave and the Bold	Young Speedy (voice)	Episode: "Sidekicks Assemble!"
2010	Zeke & Luther	Deuce	Episode: "Old Nasty"
2010–2013	Pair of Kings	Lanny	Main role
2012–2013	Mr. Young	Diego	4 episodes
2013	Schlub Life	Teen #1	Unsuccessful TV pilot
2022	iCarly	Chuck	Episode: "iObject, Lewbert!"
2024	Jersey Shore: Family Vacation	Himself	Episode: "Sue Joey"
2025	The Thundermans: Undercover	Malware	Episode: "Thundercover"

=== Web series ===
Year	Title	Role	Notes
2020	P.O.K. Save the Island	Lanny	Also director, editor
