= Bunsen Is a Beast =

American animated television series

- Genre: Comedy; Fantasy; Slapstick
- Created by: Butch Hartman
- Developed by: Butch Hartman; Ray DeLaurentis; Will Schifrin; Becky Wangberg
- Directed by: George Elliott; Keith Oliver
- Voices of: Jeremy Rowley; Ben Giroux; Kari Wahlgren
- Theme music composer: Butch Hartman; Guy Moon
- Opening theme: "Bunsen Is a Beast" (by Guy Moon)
- Ending theme: "Bunsen Is a Beast" (instrumental)
- Composer: Guy Moon
- Country of origin: United States
- Original language: English
- No. of seasons: 1
- No. of episodes: 26 (47 segments)

Production
- Executive producer: Butch Hartman
- Producers: Wren Errington; Christine Thompson; Karen Malach
- Running time: 22 minutes
- Production companies: Billionfold Inc.; Nickelodeon Animation Studio

Original release
- Network: Nickelodeon
- Release: January 16 – October 14, 2017
- Network: Nicktoons
- Release: December 18, 2017 – February 10, 2018

Bunsen Is a Beast is an American children's animated television series created by Butch Hartman for Nickelodeon. In spite of prejudice against beasts, Bunsen befriends a human boy named Mikey Munroe and his homeschooled companion, Darcy. Together, Bunsen and his friends attempt to navigate through school life while outsmarting a student named Amanda Killman who wants to rid society of Bunsen's kind.

Bunsen Is a Beast was Hartman's fourth and final animated series produced for Nickelodeon before his departure from the network, after The Fairly OddParents (2001–2017), Danny Phantom (2004–2007), and T.U.F.F. Puppy (2010–2015). The show's only season, consisting of twenty-six episodes, was ordered by Nickelodeon in December 2015.

The series had two runs on two different networks; Nickelodeon from January 16, 2017, to October 14, 2017, then Nicktoons from December 18, 2017, to February 10, 2018.

== Premise ==
Bunsen Is a Beast centers on a blue monster named Bunsen, the first beast to attend Muckledunk Middle School. Mikey Munroe, his human friend, helps him navigate through school, as he feels the pressure to prove that monsters can coexist peacefully without eating and harming others. Episodes typically focus on Bunsen learning how to complete human tasks and discovering a human tradition. Mikey also learns more about the monster world, meeting new creatures whenever he visits Bunsen's home. However, a girl named Amanda Killman believes Bunsen is dangerous and wants to destroy him so that his kind can suffer from extinction. Bunsen and Mikey must outwit Amanda whenever she comes up with a new scheme, occasionally with the help of their friend Darcy.

== Characters ==
=== Main ===
- Bunsen Beast (voiced by Jeremy Rowley) is the titular character. He is a small monster who becomes friends with Mikey and is the first beast to become a student in a human school. Bunsen's body is colored blue and white, with magenta-colored limbs. Bunsen tends to act very childish, cute and fun-loving. He has two cousins named Charlene, who resembles a llama with additional legs, and Bob, an abominable snowman.
- Mikey Milton Munroe (voiced by Ben Giroux) is Bunsen's best human friend and guide, who helps him navigate through life in Muckledunk. He attends Flap's class along with Amanda and deals with the troubles that arise between them. He has orange hair. In the pilot, Mikey was voiced by Maile Flanagan.
- Amanda Killman (voiced by Kari Wahlgren) is the main antagonist. Amanda is a self-proclaimed blossoming ingénue clad in a red, white, and blue schoolgirl uniform and Bunsen's nemesis who commonly expresses an evil grin. She is constantly scheming to get rid of Bunsen by trying to prove that beasts and humans cannot coexist. Mikey, who stands in the way of this, has become her enemy, although she has a secret crush on him, as hinted in several episodes where she has made comments on him such as praising his tan and shorts.

=== Recurring ===
- Beverly (voiced by Kari Wahlgren) is a chubby girl who is Amanda Killman's henchman/second-in-command and seems to be willing to do anything Amanda commands. She is a preschooler, and, at times, is sometimes smarter than Amanda, sensing danger ahead as Amanda mostly ignores her.
- Darcy (voiced by Cristina Milizia) is a home-schooled and socially odd girl who occasionally tags along with Bunsen and Mikey on their adventures.
- Wolfie (voiced by Kevin Michael Richardson) is an anthropomorphic wolf who is Bunsen's best friend and Mikey's second best friend.
- Sophie Sanders (voiced by Kari Wahlgren) is a preening, flamboyant girl in Flap's class who speaks in a valley girl accent. Mikey has a crush on her.
- Mr. Munroe (voiced by Jeremy Rowley) is Mikey's father.
- Mrs. Munroe (voiced by Kari Wahlgren) is Mikey's mother.
- Bunsen's Mom (voiced by Jennifer Hale) is an unnamed one-eyed octopus-like beast who is Bunsen's mother.
- Bunsen's Dad (voiced by Jeff Bennett) is an unnamed bat-like beast who is Bunsen's father.

=== Minor ===
- Tooth Fairy (voiced by Tara Strong) is the jolly-happy fairy queen who gives money to children who have lost their teeth.
- Big Mikey (voiced by Jeff Bennett) is a wild black bear whom Bunsen meets and names after Mikey.
- Doctor Revenge is a kitten that Bunsen discovers and gives to Amanda Killman.
- Jerk Von Handsome (voiced by Jeremy Rowley) is a Swedish foreign exchange student who used to be Amanda's crush.
- Officer Steve Stevenson (voiced by Chris Hardwick) is a security guard at Muckledunk Museum.
- Malory is an Afro-American student in Flap's class.
- Commander Cone (voiced by Jerry Trainor) is the head of an ice cream truck. Introduced in "Bunsen Screams for Ice Cream", Cone reappears in "Astro-Nots", where Bunsen and Mikey see him in MASA and mistake him for a Mastronaut. He gives them a tour, but accidentally launches them into space. Cone later becomes a MASA Alien Space Defender.
  - Liz is Commander Cone's sister.
- Vanessa is Commander Cone's ex-girlfriend. According to Cone, she broke up with him on his birthday, Christmas Eve, after he became an ice cream vendor.
- Bog Beast (voiced by Ben Giroux) is a green swamp creature who first appeared in "Unhappy Campers".
- Blog Beast is a beast who only terrifies people with his boring posts about what he had for lunch, which usually annoys Bunsen.
- Miss Flap (voiced by Cheri Oteri) is Bunsen's teacher at Muckledunk Middle School.
- Hugging Chair is Bunsen's chair who first appeared in "Hug It Out-ch!". At first, it trapped Amanda and wouldn't let her go, but in the end, Bunsen makes Amanda happy, and the chair releases her.
- Anti-Claus is a Santa Claus-like villain with which Amanda conspires who first appeared in "Bunsen Saves Christmas".
- Amazing Eric (voiced by Jeremy Rowley) is a magician who attends Flap's class.

== Development ==
The idea for Bunsen Is a Beast originated in a drawing of a monster facing a boy that Hartman drew in 2009. According to an article published in Variety, he kept the drawing in his office at Nickelodeon until a network executive noticed it and asked him to pitch the concept as a television show. He then began developing the show in 2012 and was given the green light in 2014 to start working on a story board for it.

Prominent themes highlighted in the series include the positive aspects of social integration and the celebration of different cultures. The message that "no matter who you are, you can always find a place to fit in" inspired the show's underlying theme of embracing integration. When asked in an interview with Heidi MacDonald's Comics Beat if the show could be interpreted as a metaphor for "accepting and befriending refugees," Hartman mentioned that the social commentary was "a little bit" intentional. Guy Moon, who previous worked with Hartman on his previous shows, composed the show's music and theme song. Animation began about a year before the show premiered. He originally considered writing a picture book featuring the characters, but decided against going forward with the idea until an executive from Nickelodeon saw the drawing and encouraged him to develop the concept into a television program.

=== Cancellation ===
Butch Hartman announced the show's cancellation after a single season in a 2018 YouTube video in which he announced he had left Nickelodeon.

== Episodes ==
No.	Title	Written by	Storyboard by	Original release date	Prod. code	U.S. viewers (millions)
Nickelodeon
1a	"Bunsen Is a Beast!"	Butch Hartman, Ray DeLaurentis, Will Schifrin and Becky Wiangberg	Butch Hartman and Steve Daye	February 20, 2017	101	1.58
Bunsen attends his first day at Muckledunk Middle School, but runs into trouble when Amanda puts beets in his drink and he turns into a monster that eats people.
1b	"Body and the Beast"	Ray DeLaurentis, Will Schifrin and Becky Wangberg	Steve Remen	February 20, 2017	101	1.58
Mikey and Darcy help Bunsen find his body in time for picture day before it grows a new head and destroys the world.
2a	"Hide and Go Freak"	Ray DeLaurentis, Will Schifrin and Becky Wangberg	Ted Collyer	January 16, 2017	102	1.40
Amanda disguises herself as a beast to expose Bunsen, but they play "Hide and Go Freak" together and Amanda learns that Bunsen's house doesn't take kindly to bad people.
2b	"Bunsen Screams for Ice Cream"	Bob Colleary, Ray DeLaurentis, Will Schifrin and Becky Wangberg	Brian Coughlan	January 16, 2017	102	1.40
Amanda tries to get Bunsen expelled by using an ice cream truck to lure him out of school. Special Guest Star: Jerry Trainor as Commander Cone
3a	"Bearly Acceptable Behavior"	Grant Levy and Dominik Rothbrad	Katie Shanahan	February 21, 2017	103	1.38
Bunsen brings a bear to class and Amanda tries to get the bear to attack her in front of people.
3b	"Beast Busters"	Ellen Byron, Bob Colleary, Ray DeLaurentis, Lissa Kapstrom, Will Schifrin and Becky Wangberg	Steve Remen	February 21, 2017	103	1.38
Bunsen and Mikey save Amanda from sneeze beasts that come from Bunsen's nose, but they end up going to a taco truck, a lemonade stand and the beach.
4a	"Spelling Beast"	Ellen Byron, Bob Colleary, Ray DeLaurentis, Lissa Kapstrom, Will Schifrin and Becky Wangberg	Steve Daye	February 22, 2017	104	1.42
After Bunsen gets stinged to prove that bees are experts on the spelling bee, he turns into a bee.
4b	"Mikey Is a Beast"	Ellen Byron, Bob Colleary, Ray DeLaurentis, Lissa Kapstrom, Will Schifrin and Becky Wangberg	Ted Collyer	February 22, 2017	104	1.42
Bunsen becomes a mascot for Mikey's biggest hero, Jerry the Beast, a parody of Randy Savage. But after a while, he ends up not letting Mikey come. Special Guest Star: Kevin Michael Richardson as Jerry the Beast
5a	"Fright at the Museum"	Ellen Byron, Bob Colleary, Ray DeLaurentis, Lissa Kapstrom, Will Schifrin and Becky Wangberg	Katie Shanahan	February 23, 2017	105	1.27
Bunsen and Mikey discover Bunsen's uncle at a museum, and they try to sneak him out for dinner and shoe shopping with Bunsen's aunt he was supposed to go a decade ago. Special Guest Star: Chris Hardwick as Officer Steve Stevenson
5b	"Handsome Beast"	Ellen Byron, Bob Colleary, Ray DeLaurentis, Lissa Kapstrom, Will Schifrin and Becky Wangberg	Brian Coughlan	February 23, 2017	105	1.27
Bunsen transforms into a human hunk when he eats a fancy body spray, and Amanda falls for him.
6	"Tooth or Consequences"	Ellen Byron, Bob Colleary, Ray DeLaurentis, Lissa Kapstrom, Will Schifrin and Becky Wangberg	Ted Collyer and Brian Coughlan	February 25, 2017	107	1.74
Mikey explains that Bunsen will be richer than Amanda after the tooth fairy leaves him money for all the teeth he loses during teeth losing season, so Amanda vows to catch the tooth fairy.
7a	"Thunder and Frightening"	Ellen Byron, Bob Colleary, Ray DeLaurentis, Lissa Kapstrom, Will Schifrin and Becky Wangberg	Katie Shanahan	March 11, 2017	108	1.59
Amanda wants to use Bunsen's fear of thunder to scare him out of Muckledunk.
7b	"Eyes on the Pies"	Lissa Kapstrom and Will Schifrin	Chad Hicks	March 11, 2017	108	1.59
Bunsen begins to lose his memory after getting hiccups.
8a	"Happy Beastgiving"	Ellen Byron, Bob Colleary, Ray DeLaurentis, Lissa Kapstrom, Will Schifrin and Becky Wangberg	Craig Valde	March 18, 2017	109	1.52
It is the beast holiday, Beastgiving, so Mikey helps Bunsen deliver dream gifts to the citizens of Muckledunk.
8b	"Beastern Standard Time"	Ellen Byron, Bob Colleary, Ray DeLaurentis, Lissa Kapstrom, Will Schifrin and Becky Wangberg	Ted Collyer	March 18, 2017	109	1.52
Bunsen's internal clock gets thrown off during daylight saving time.
9	"Beast of Friends"	Ellen Byron, Bob Colleary, Ray DeLaurentis, Lissa Kapstrom, Will Schifrin and Becky Wangberg	Chad Hicks and Steve Remen	March 4, 2017	106	1.73
Bunsen is excited to take Mikey to Dimmsdale to meet Cosmo on Friend-iversary, but trouble arises when Amanda secretly follows them and looks out for Mr. Crocker. Note: This episode is a crossover with The Fairly OddParents.
10a	"Unhappy Campers"	Ellen Byron, Bob Colleary, Ray DeLaurentis, Lissa Kapstrom, Will Schifrin and Becky Wangberg	Brian Coughlan	March 25, 2017	110	1.37
Bunsen and Darcy try to help Mikey overcome his fear of the woods during an overnight camping trip.
10b	"Hall of Justice"	Butch Hartman	Katie Shanahan	March 25, 2017	110	1.37
Amanda tries to sabotage Mikey and Bunsen after they are appointed as the new hall monitors.
11	"Astro-Nots"	Ellen Byron, Bob Colleary, Ray DeLaurentis, Lissa Kapstrom, Will Schifrin and Becky Wangberg	Chad Hicks and Craig Valde	April 14, 2017	111	1.23
While on a field trip to MASA, Commander Cone gives Mikey and Bunsen a tour of MASA (even though he's an ice cream guy) and they accidentally get launched into space. Special Guest Star: Jerry Trainor as Commander Cone
12a	"Cookie Monster"	Ellen Byron, Bob Colleary, Ray DeLaurentis, Lissa Kapstrom, Will Schifrin and Becky Wangberg	Katie Shanahan	June 3, 2017	113	1.23
Amanda turns into a ferocious beast monster and causes panic at school after eating Bunsen's beast cookies.
12b	"Braces for Disaster"	Ellen Byron, Bob Colleary, Ray DeLaurentis, Lissa Kapstrom, Will Schifrin and Becky Wangberg	Chad Hicks	June 3, 2017	113	1.23
While Mikey, Bunsen and Amanda work on a project, they decide to study minks when Amanda's braces causes minks to come every time she says "beast".
13a	"Hug It Out-ch!"	Ellen Byron, Bob Colleary, Ray DeLaurentis, Lissa Kapstrom, Will Schifrin and Becky Wangberg	Brian Coughlan	June 10, 2017	112	1.09
Amanda gets trapped in Bunsen's hugging chair and can only be released once she is happy.
13b	"Guinea Some Lovin'"	Ellen Byron, Bob Colleary, Ray DeLaurentis, Lissa Kapstrom, Will Schifrin and Becky Wangberg	Ted Collyer	June 10, 2017	112	1.09
Bunsen falls in love with a guinea pig and tries to woo her, while Amanda tries to sabotage the love affair.
14a	"Mikey-plication"	Ellen Byron, Bob Colleary, Ray DeLaurentis, Lissa Kapstrom, Will Schifrin and Becky Wangberg	Ted Collyer	June 17, 2017	114	1.14
To make time for their band, Mucklefunk, Bunsen clones Mikey so his clones can run all of his after school clubs.
14b	"The Case of the Cold Case"	Ellen Byron, Bob Colleary, Ray DeLaurentis, Lissa Kapstrom, Will Schifrin and Becky Wangberg	Craig Valde	June 17, 2017	114	1.14
Mikey and Bunsen go into detective mode after Commander Cone is framed for stealing Amanda's phone case. Special Guest Star: Jerry Trainor as Commander Cone
15a	"Bunsen's Beast Ball"	Ellen Byron, Bob Colleary, Ray DeLaurentis, Lissa Kapstrom, Will Schifrin and Becky Wangberg	Brian Coughlan	June 24, 2017	115	1.35
Bunsen's beast ball tells him and Mikey to do fun things, until Amanda swaps out the ball for one of her own.
15b	"Bromeo and Juliet"	Ellen Byron, Bob Colleary, Ray DeLaurentis, Lissa Kapstrom, Will Schifrin and Becky Wangberg	Katie Shanahan	June 24, 2017	115	1.35
Mikey wants the lead role in a play so he can get a kiss from Sophie Sanders, but Amanda plans to sabotage that.
16	"Beast Halloween Ever"	Eilen Byron, Bob Colleary, Ray DeLaurentis, Lissa Kapstrom, Will Schifrin and Becky Wangberg	Bryan Huff and Brian Coughlan	October 14, 2017	121	1.42
Mikey is excited to show Bunsen how to collect candy on his first Halloween, but Amanda plans to steal everyone's candy for herself. Special Guest Stars: Kevin Michael Richardson as Wolfie and Carly Kaplin as Little Girl
Nicktoons
17	"Bunsen Saves Christmas"	Ellen Byron, Bob Colleary, Ray DeLaurentis, Lissa Kapstrom, Will Schifrin and Becky Wangberg	Riccardo Durante and Bryan Huff	December 18, 2017 (Note: This episode first aired in the United Kingdom on December 8, 2017.)	125	0.10
Bunsen becomes excited about celebrating his first Christmas; when Amanda finds out she's on the naughty list, she stuffs Santa in a gift box and hijacks all the toys.
18a	"Beastie Besties"	Ellen Byron, Bob Colleary, Ray DeLaurentis, Lissa Kapstrom, Will Schifrin and Becky Wangberg	Chad Hicks	December 19, 2017	118	0.12
Amanda becomes Mikey and Bunsen's best friend after they perform the Best Friends Forever beast ceremony.
18b	"By Hook or By Schnook"	Ellen Byron, Bob Colleary, Ray DeLaurentis, Lissa Kapstrom, Will Schifrin and Becky Wangberg	Katie Shanahan	December 19, 2017	118	0.12
Amanda sends Mikey and Bunsen on a bogus treasure hunt by giving them a fake map to Captain Schnook's Booty.
19a	"Boodle Loo"	Max Beaudry	Brian Coughlan	December 20, 2017	120	0.12
Mikey and Bunsen have to find Boodles, Bunsen's invisible dog, after Amanda lures him away from home.
19b	"The Boy Who Cried Wolfie"	Ellen Byron, Bob Colleary, Ray DeLaurentis, Lissa Kapstrom, Will Schifrin and Becky Wangberg	Katie Shanahan	December 20, 2017	120	0.12
Bunsen's best beast friend, Wolfie, comes to visit Muckledunk and has his eyes and stomach set on Mikey. Special Guest Star: Kevin Michael Richardson as Wolfie
20a	"Adventures in Beastysitting"	Ellen Byron, Bob Colleary, Ray DeLaurentis, Lissa Kapstrom, Will Schifrin and Becky Wangberg	Ted Collyer	December 21, 2017	117	0.08
Mikey and Bunsen have to deliver a beast baby after accidentally switching packages at the monstork factory.
20b	"Wilda Beast"	Ellen Byron, Bob Colleary, Ray DeLaurentis, Lissa Kapstrom, Will Schifrin and Becky Wangberg	Brian Coughlan	December 21, 2017	117	0.08
Bunsen's cousin Wilda (Rachel Dratch) comes to town and develops a crush on Mikey, which terrifies him and makes Amanda jealous.
21a	"Bad Chair Day"	Ellen Byron, Bob Colleary, Ray DeLaurentis, Lissa Kapstrom, Will Schifrin and Becky Wangberg	Ted Collyer and Sarah Johnson	December 22, 2017	119	N/A
Mikey and Bunsen are forced apart after Miss Flap changes the seating chart to mix things up.
21b	"Stupor Bowl"	Ellen Byron, Bob Colleary, Ray DeLaurentis, Lissa Kapstrom, Will Schifrin and Becky Wangberg	Bryan Huff and Rachel Peters	December 22, 2017	119	N/A
When Bunsen is hypnotized by swirling toilet water, Amanda tries to convince him to return to Beast World.
22a	"Remote Outta Control"	Ellen Byron, Bob Colleary, Ray DeLaurentis, Lissa Kapstrom, Will Schifrin and Becky Wangberg	Gerry Duchemin	December 26, 2017	122	0.19
When Bunsen eats Amanda's universal remote, he and Mikey have to rescue her from her malfunctioning smart house.
22b	"Network Newbs"	Ellen Byron, Bob Colleary, Ray DeLaurentis, Lissa Kapstrom, Will Schifrin and Becky Wangberg	Luc Latulippe	December 26, 2017	122	0.19
Mikey and Bunsen compete against Amanda for the chance to have their own segment on the local news channel.
23a	"Amanda Gets Schooled"	Ellen Byron, Bob Colleary, Ray DeLaurentis, Lissa Kapstrom, Will Schifrin and Becky Wangberg	Chad Hicks	December 27, 2017	116	N/A
Mikey and Bunsen help Amanda pass the Preparatory Overview Of Pupils test so she can avoid summer school.
23b	"Beast in Show"	Butch Hartman	Bryan Huff and Rachel Peters	December 27, 2017	116	N/A
Mikey enters Bunsen into the Muckledunk Mutt Show, but Amanda tries to sabotage them and win with her robot dog.
24a	"Snooze Alarm"	Ellen Byron, Bob Colleary, Ray DeLaurentis, Lissa Kapstrom, Will Schifrin and Becky Wangberg	Brian Coughlan	December 28, 2017	124	0.24
Mikey attempts to keep Bunsen up past his appointed hibernation time.
24b	"Split Decision"	Ellen Byron, Bob Colleary, Ray DeLaurentis, Lissa Kapstrom, Will Schifrin and Becky Wangberg	Gerry Duchemin	December 28, 2017	124	0.24
Mikey and Bunsen go on a shopping spree adventure at the "I've So Gotta Have It" store.
25a	"Hair Today Gone Tomorrow"	Ellen Byron, Bob Colleary, Ray DeLaurentis, Lissa Kapstrom, Will Schifrin and Becky Wangberg	Ralph Zondag	December 29, 2017	123	N/A
Mikey and Bunsen use Boodles' fur to turn invisible and sneak into a scary movie they are too young to see.
25b	"Ice Dream"	Butch Hartman	Bryan Huff	December 29, 2017	123	N/A
Mikey and Bunsen try to help local ice cream delivery guy Commander Cone find his dream job. Special Guest Stars: Jerry Trainor as Commander Cone and Memory Commander Cone and Carly Kaplin as Helen and Boy
26a	"Friend or Phony"	Ray DeLaurentis and Will Schifrin	Brian Coughlan	February 10, 2018	126	N/A
Mikey and Bunsen are on a game show.
26b	"Beauty or the Beast"	Ray DeLaurentis and Will Schifrin	Gerry Duchemin	February 10, 2018	126	N/A
Mikey must choose between Bunsen and his dream girl.

== Broadcast ==
A sneak peek of Bunsen Is a Beast was first shown at Comic-Con in 2016. The series has aired on YTV in Canada on June 3, 2017. The series premiered on Nickelodeon in Israel on June 4, 2017, Nickelodeon in Australia and New Zealand on June 5, 2017. The series premiered on Nickelodeon in Greece on July 15, 2017, and Nicktoons in the United Kingdom on September 4, 2017.

In France, the series first aired on Nickelodeon from 25 September 2017 to 30 November 2018, and had reruns on the free-to-air channel Gulli starting from 22 December 2018.

== Reception ==
=== Critical ===
The show received positive reviews from critics. Robert Lloyd of the Los Angeles Times praised Bunsen Is a Beast in his review, likening it to "an early Hanna-Barbera cartoon with the engine of Tex Avery at his eye-popping extreme" and commending its message about embracing outsiders as "particularly timely."

Emily Ashby of Common Sense Media gave the series 3 out of 5 stars; saying that, "This series has an admirable premise that's illustrated by a surprising friendship, but the show's more irritating elements can overshadow its better points." But added that, "kids will like the show's over-the-top situations and Bunsen's bizarre reactions to them."

=== Accolades ===
Year	Award	Category	Nominee	Result	Ref.
2018	45th Annie Awards	Outstanding Achievement for Voice Acting in an Animated Television / Broadcast Production	Jeremy Rowley as "Bunsen"	Nominated	
