= Jeremy Rowley =

American actor (born 1978)

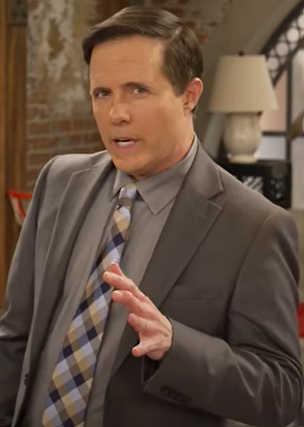
- Rowley in 2022
- Born: New York, U.S.
- Occupations: Actor; writer; comedian
- Years active: 1999–present
- Spouse: Danielle Morrow (m. 2016)
- Children: 1

Jeremy Rowley is an American actor, comedian, and writer.

He is known for Coyote Ugly (2000), Epic Movie and Cougar Club (both 2007) as well as for playing Lewbert on the Nickelodeon television series iCarly, Bunsen in Bunsen Is a Beast and Broderick in Modern Family.

== Career ==
Rowley has appeared in several television shows and films, often portraying somewhat "ballistic" characters, especially on television shows. On the Nickelodeon television series iCarly, Rowley played Lewbert, a mean and nasty doorman of Bushwell Plaza, where Carly, Freddie, and Spencer all live. On Carly and Sam's web show, they have a segment called "Messin' With Lewbert" where the two girls play pranks on Lewbert downstairs in the lobby of the building. On the show, Lewbert is recognized for having excessive anger outbursts (i.e., when people walk all over the floor he just mopped).

Rowley has also appeared on The Amanda Show, most notably the sketch called "Blockblister" (a parody of the video retail chain Blockbuster), where he plays a customer angered by the film he rented. He is also known as Ming on the podcast Comedy Bang! Bang!.

Rowley is a member of the improvisational and sketch comedy group called The Groundlings, based in Los Angeles, California. He also voiced Bunsen on the Nickelodeon animated series Bunsen Is a Beast, for which he received an Annie Award nomination.

In 2019, Rowley worked as a writer and voice actor in the Fox series Bless the Harts, where he portrayed Jimmy Lee and Mayor Webb, with the latter role being recast in later episodes to Jon Hamm.

== Filmography ==
=== Internet ===
- The Office Web Episode
- Urban Meyer Press Conference Parody

=== Television ===
Year	Title	Role	Notes
1999	Charmed	Treasure Hunter #2	Episode: "That Old Black Magic"
2000	The Amanda Show	Amanda's fake father / Customer / Hobo / Various roles	3 episodes
2000	Strip Mall	Health Department Supervisor	Episode: "Mommy Dearest"
2002–2003	All That	Rate the Pain victim and judge / Professor Chafes / Ernie's boss	6 episodes
2002–2003	According to Jim	Raggedy Ann / Waiter #1	2 episodes
2004	Terry Tate, Office Linebacker: Sensitivity Training	Paul Merkin	
2005	Out of Practice	Arthur	2 episodes
2006	America's Next Top Model, Cycle 6	Guest star	Episode: "The Girl With Two Bad Takes"
2006	Lovespring International	Tiffany's Ex-Boyfriend	Episode: "The Loser Club"
2007	Drake & Josh	Auditioner/Dance Manager	Episodes: "Megan's New Teacher (during the end credits)" and "Dance Contest"
2007–2008	Reno 911!	Blind drunk guy / The Great Jeff	2 episodes
2007–2012	iCarly	Lewbert	13 episodes
2008	Chocolate News	Larry	Unknown episodes
2010–2012	The Jay Leno Show	Himself	4 episodes
2011	Modern Family	Broderick	Episode: "Bixby's Back"
2011–2012	Desperate Housewives	Nurse	2 episodes
2012	The Real Housewives of Atlanta	Himself	Episode: "Peaches Don't Grow in Hollywood"
2015–2018	Mike Tyson Mysteries	Gregor, RJ, Haulani the Tiger	Voice, 3 episodes Also wrote the episode "Time to Fly"
2016	Bajillion Dollar Propertie$	Vitali	Episode: "Predator Party"
2016	Game Shakers	Gerald	Episode: "Poison Pie"
2016	Henry Danger	Schwabbit	Episode: "Hour of Power"
2017–2018	Bunsen Is a Beast	Bunsen Beast, Mikey's Dad, various voices	Voice, main role
2017–2018	Nobodies	Bradley	6 episodes
2019–2021	Bless the Harts	Mayor Webb, Jimmy Lee	Voice, recurring role, also writer
2022–2023	iCarly	Lewbert	5 episodes
2024–2026	Max & the Midknights	Uncle Budrick	Voice

=== Film ===
Year	Title	Role	Notes
2000	Coyote Ugly	William Morris Receptionist	
2007	Cougar Club	Karl	
2007	Epic Movie	Pirate	
2017	Speech & Debate	Gary Crenshaw	

== Personal life ==
Rowley married actress Danielle Morrow in 2016, who also appeared on iCarly as Nora Dershlit in the episodes "iPsycho" and "iStill Psycho", and later in the 2014 Sam & Cat episode "#SuperPsycho". They have a son together.
