= Roger Christiansen =

American television director (1952–2025)

- Born: Roger Secrist Christiansen; October 2, 1952; New London, Connecticut, U.S.
- Died: July 8, 2025 (aged 72); Waterford, Connecticut, U.S.
- Other names: Roger S. Christiansen
- Occupation: Television director
- Years active: 1985–2025

Roger Secrist Christiansen (October 2, 1952 — July 8, 2025) was an American television director.

== Life and career ==
Christiansen worked as a director, associate director and technical coordinator for a number of notable television series. His credits include Friends, Joey, Girlfriends, Hannah Montana, Drake & Josh, iCarly, Zoey 101, True Jackson, VP, The Haunted Hathaways, Suddenly Susan, Murphy Brown, Mad About You, The Drew Carey Show and For Your Love.

In addition to directing, Christiansen also taught film at University of Southern California School of Cinematic Arts, Columbia University Film Division, Tokyo University of Technology and The School of Film and Television in Cuba.

Christiansen died in Waterford, Connecticut on July 8, 2025, at the age of 72.
