= David Kendall (director) =

American television director, producer and writer (1957–2026)

- Born: October 4, 1957; Philadelphia, Pennsylvania, U.S.
- Died: May 2, 2026 (aged 68)
- Occupations: Director; producer; writer
- Years active: 1985–2026

David Kendall (October 4, 1957 – May 2, 2026) was an American television and film director, screenwriter, television producer and showrunner.

== Life and career ==
Kendall directed, produced and wrote for a number of television series, including Growing Pains, Boy Meets World, Smart Guy, Hannah Montana, Zoey 101, iCarly, Victorious, Ned's Declassified School Survival Guide, Big Time Rush, Imagination Movers, Melissa & Joey, and The Really Loud House.

He also worked in films. He directed the 2005 film Dirty Deeds starring Milo Ventimiglia and Lacey Chabert, among other projects. He wrote the screenplays for the films The New Guy and Revenge of the Bridesmaids.

Kendall graduated from Wesleyan University in 1979, where he majored in both film studies and government.

On May 2, 2026, Kendall died at the age of 68.
