= Steve Hoefer =

American television director

- Born: California, United States
- Occupations: Television director, former stage manager
- Years active: 1990–present
- Children: 2

Steve Hoefer is an American television director and former stage manager. He is known for his work as a stage manager on several television series such as Boy Meets World, All That, and The Amanda Show, and has since transitioned to directing episodes of other shows, including Drake & Josh, Zoey 101, iCarly, Victorious, Jessie, A.N.T. Farm, Sam & Cat, Henry Danger, and Game Shakers.

== Career ==
Hoefer began his career in the entertainment industry as tour guide at Universal Studios Hollywood after graduating from the University of Southern California majoring in theater while also studying Film/Television, Communications and History. Through a number of contacts he became a production assistant on The Fresh Prince of Bel-Air, then served as a stage manager on Out All Night. He then became a part of the Boy Meets World crew, where he made his directorial debut during that show's final season in 2000.

He began working with Nickelodeon in 2000, serving as the Stage Manager/AD and occasional Director for The Amanda Show and All That. In 2001, he stage managed for five episodes for the sitcom So Little Time starring Mary-Kate and Ashley Olsen. Hoefer continued to direct the series Drake & Josh, Zoey 101, iCarly, Victorious, Sam & Cat, Henry Danger and Game Shakers. Other than directing series for Nickelodeon, he has also directed episodes of Disney Channel series A.N.T. Farm and Jessie, in 2012 and 2014 respectively.

During the COVID-19 pandemic, Hoefer created, produced and Co-Hosted the Top 10 List podcast, PopuList with Steve & Kirk, also starring Dante's Peak actor and longtime friend, Kirk Trutner. The podcast originated in 2020 and still airs.

Hoefer is a member of the Directors Guild of America.

== Personal life ==
Hoefer is married and has two sons.
