= Marjorie Husted =

American actress

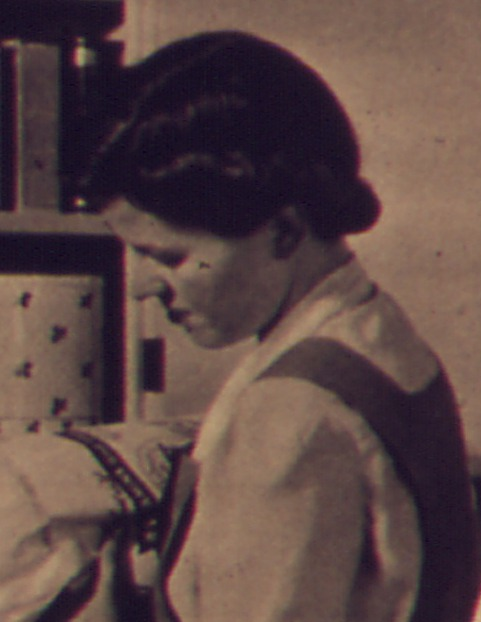
- Husted c. 1944
- Born: Marjorie Child; April 2, 1892; Minneapolis, Minnesota, U.S.
- Died: December 23, 1986 (aged 94); Minneapolis, Minnesota, U.S.
- Education: University of Minnesota
- Occupations: Home economist; businesswoman; scriptwriter; radio voice artist; food book publisher
- Known for: Co-developer of brand character "Betty Crocker", mascot for General Mills

Marjorie Husted (née Child; April 2, 1892 – December 23, 1986) was an American home economist and businesswoman who worked for General Mills and was responsible for the success and fame of the brand character Betty Crocker. Husted wrote Betty Crocker's radio scripts and was her radio voice for a time.

Several different women are believed by different audiences to be the woman behind Betty Crocker. (Note: Janette Kelley who developed the chiffon cake, Agnes White who helped to write the Betty Crocker Cookbook, and Adelaide Hawley Cumming who portrayed Crocker on television, all were at one time home economists employed by General Mills Home Service. Blanche Ingersoll, also of Home Service, was the original radio voice in 1924 until 1926.) Until the company admitted she was not a real person, Husted answered to the name Betty Crocker for visitors to General Mills.

Husted's original ideas and hard work transformed Betty Crocker, in the words of author Laura Shapiro, into "the most successful culinary authority ever invented."

== Education and early career ==
Born in Minneapolis, Minnesota, the daughter of Sampson Child and his wife, Alice, she studied home economics and German at the University of Minnesota where she was a member of Kappa Alpha Theta.

She graduated in 1913 and returned to the university for a degree in education.

She first worked as a secretary at the Infant Welfare Society of Minneapolis, and then at the Red Cross during World War I. After the war she belonged to the Women's Cooperative Alliance. In 1923 she became supervisor of promotional advertising and merchandising for the Creamette Company. She married Knute Wallace Husted in 1925 in Hennepin, Minnesota.

== General Mills ==
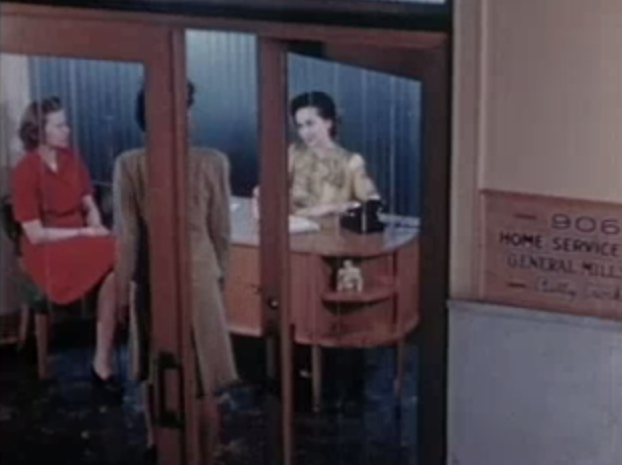
General Mills Home Service department (before 1929)

In 1924, she went to work as a field representative in home economics for the Washburn–Crosby Company which four years later became General Mills. For a year, she taught Gold Medal successful cooking schools around the country and was then in 1926 sent back to Minneapolis, where she organized the Home Service Department, comprising five home economists and herself. Their job was to answer homemaking questions from the public, all signed "Betty Crocker," whom General Mills had invented in 1921. The department was renamed the Betty Crocker Homemaking Service in 1929, with forty staff members and Husted as director.

== Betty Crocker ==
For the next few decades Husted worked to make Betty Crocker an empire. She turned Betty Crocker into a radio and television star, a newspaper columnist, and a book and pamphlet author, who sold food and eventually silverware and small appliances. After some time, at the General Mills president's directive, when visitors to General Mills met Husted, she was introduced as Betty Crocker.

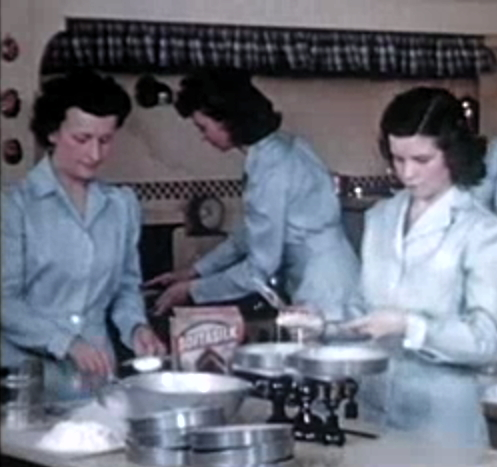
Home economists working in General Mills test kitchen

Promoting their product, Gold Medal flour, in 1921 General Mills sponsored a contest in which home bakers returned a jigsaw puzzle and received a pin cushion in the shape of a sack of Gold Medal, but they were unprepared for the flood of questions that were submitted alongside contest entries. "Why does my cake crack on top?" "How do you make a one-crust cherry pie?" At first company executives answered the letters, finally passing the task to a source who women were more likely to trust, a spokeswoman they invented named Betty Crocker.

While teaching Gold Medal cooking schools, Husted learned a method of learning about cooks and their problems and interests. In each new city she visited, she sent high-school girls to interview local cooks. Later in Minneapolis, each recipe developed in a General Mills test kitchen was then given to local homemakers to try. Husted went to their kitchens and saw, for example, that when "they measured flour and...sugar they would tap down the cup." So Betty Crocker recipes had to be foolproof for these household errors. Her observations went to General Mills research where they became recipes and instructions from Betty Crocker. General Mills eventually created its product development in three stages: home economists tried the recipe in a test kitchen, then a group of Minneapolis homemakers tried it, and finally it was tested by a much larger group of homemakers across the nation.

== Radio, retirement ==
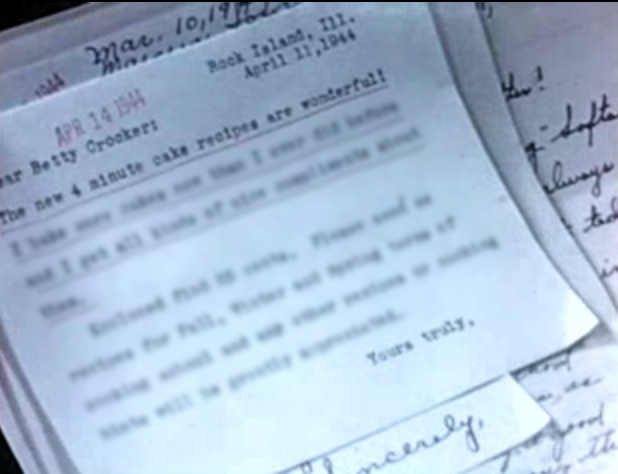
By 1945, Betty Crocker received 4,000 letters a day asking for homemaking help. Each week, Crocker received an average of four to five marriage proposals.

From its debut in 1924, with Home Service's Blanche Ingersoll as Betty, until 1953, Gold Medal Flour Home Service Talks, later known as Betty Crocker Cooking School of the Air was a daytime broadcast.

At first the show was only on the Minneapolis radio station that Washburn-Crosby acquired and named WCCO. The show expanded to stations throughout the country, with different women featured as Betty, until 1936 when recording equipment became more widely available, making a single voice as Betty possible. During the 1950s, the five minute show Time for Betty Crocker broadcast nine times a week. Laura Shapiro writes in her 2004 book Something from the Oven that these shows existed "before broadcasting enforced any important distinction between editorial content and advertising." (Note: Crocker's voice was initially Blanche Ingersoll who worked for General Mills Home Service. After two years, Husted took over. Then until 1936, she was voiced by different women in different cities. Later, Crocker was voiced by Agnes White.)

Husted wrote all of Betty Crocker's scripts for the cooking school show and took over as the radio voice in 1926 or 1927 and remained so for perhaps up to two decades, but she played a larger role in expanding Betty Crocker's character.

She interviewed "eligible bachelors" and visited movie stars like Joan Crawford, Dolores del Río, Jean Harlow, Clark Gable and Cary Grant to ask them about their life at home. She created games and quizzes and drama pieces based on letters she received. During World War II, Crocker starred in Our Nation's Rations and after the war Husted helped start The Betty Crocker Magazine of the Air. Shapiro says, "Under her direction, Betty Crocker became a figure of dignity who treated homemakers with respect." Husted strove to make Crocker appear to be a home economist with professional experience, not a home cook. By 1948, Betty Crocker was known to 91 percent of American homemakers.

In 1946, Husted was named a consultant to the officers and executives of General Mills. In 1948 she was made consultant in advertising, public relations, and home service. Husted researched and published Betty Crocker's Good and Easy Cookbook in 1950, which sold 18 million copies, and ultimately the Betty Crocker cookbooks numbered about 50 titles that sold 45 million copies. She retired from the company in 1950 when she formed the consultancy Marjorie Child Husted and Associates.

== Gender discrimination ==
In 1951, in a speech to the American Association of University Women, Husted said, "Management is dominated by men and there is no indication of interest on the part of employers for change." When she retired, she earned about one-fourth the salary of their top salesman, even though General Mills executives told Husted she had done more for the company's sales than any other person.

== Awards and honors ==
In 1948, President Truman presented the Woman of the Year award of the Women's National Press Club to six women including Husted.

Also in 1948, Husted was a consultant for the national food conservation program of the United States Department of Agriculture. Husted was named Advertising Woman of the Year in 1949 by the Advertising Federation of America. That year she served on the AAUW Committee on the Status of Women and helped research and edit selected AAUW publications until about 1955.

== Bibliography ==
- Shapiro, Laura (2004). Something from the Oven: Reinventing Dinner in 1950s America. Viking (Penguin). ISBN 0-670-87154-0.
- The Editors of Encyclopædia Britannica (March 8, 2016). "Marjorie Child Husted: American businesswoman". Britannica. Encyclopædia Britannica.
