= Philip Morris Playhouse =

Radio anthology series

- Genre: Dramatic anthology
- Running time: 30 minutes
- Country of origin: United States
- Language: English
- Syndicates: CBS
- Hosted by: Charles Martin
- Announcer: Joe King; Bud Collyer; Ken Roberts; Art Ballinger; Nelson Case; Carl Frank
- Written by: Morton Fine; David Friedkin; Milton Geiger; David Ellis; John Hobish; Harold Swanton
- Directed by: William Spier; Jack Johnstone; Charles Martin
- Produced by: William Spier
- Original release: June 30, 1939 – September 2, 1953
- Opening theme: On the Trail from Grand Canyon Suite
- Sponsored by: Philip Morris cigarettes

Philip Morris Playhouse is a 30-minute old-time radio dramatic anthology series.

The program "[g]enerally ... featured straight and crime drama," radio historian John Dunning wrote. He noted that one of the directors was William Spier, who "had directed Suspense in its salad days and brought to The Philip Morris Playhouse the same slick production" that was used in Suspense.

Philip Morris Playhouse was broadcast on CBS June 30, 1939 – February 18, 1944, then returned to the air (again on CBS) November 5, 1948 – July 29, 1949. The 1948 edition replaced a giveaway show, Everybody Wins. Its third and final incarnation on radio was a bit more complicated, as explained on The Digital Deli Too website:

The emerging popularity of between three and five other popular playhouse formats of the early 1950s persuaded Philip Morris to resurrect its Philip Morris Playhouse a third time as Phillip Morris Playhouse On Broadway, beginning with its initial CBS run on March 15, 1951. Emphasizing Broadway productions, the subsequent series ran over CBS for twenty-six installments, only to jump to NBC on September 11, 1951. The series ran on NBC for the remainder of 1951, jumping back to CBS on January 13, 1952. CBS aired the remainder of the canon through September 2, 1953.

In 1951, a trade publication reported that the program's annual budget was $1 million.

== Background and format ==
Philip Morris Playhouse evolved from an earlier radio program, Johnny Presents, which featured both music and a dramatic segment in each episode. That program's name referred to Johnny Roventini (sometimes known as "Little Johnny"), a dwarf bellhop who made famous the advertising slogan "Call for Philip Morris." In 1939, the segments were separated to create two programs, a musical show featuring Johnny Green on NBC and the drama-oriented Philip Morris Playhouse on CBS.

A newspaper article published when the show resumed in 1948 summarized its format as it replaced a giveaway show, saying, "Instead of a carload full of prizes, the listeners will get big-name Hollywood and Broadway stars in a weekly series based mostly on original scripts of a crime-mystery nature with a strong psychological element."

The program did not have a regular cast, relying instead on guest actors and actresses from week to week. In the words of a 1949 article in Sponsor magazine, "Playhouse uses name stars." Those featured during its time on the air compose a virtual Who's Who of entertainment. Sylvia Sidney, Claude Rains, Eddie Cantor, Tallulah Bankhead, Burgess Meredith, Maureen O'Sullivan, Lana Turner, Joan Bennett, Franchot Tone, Raymond Massey, Pat O'Brien, Brian Donlevy and George Raft are but a sample of the overall list.

With stars changing from week to week, responsibility for the quality and success of Philip Morris Playhouse lay largely in the hands of its director. For most of the program's run, that director was William Spier, who a 1949 magazine article said "is generally rated radio's top-notch creator of suspense-type dramas." Spier's dedication to quality was such that he took a recorder along on a vacation in Europe. After he returned, a magazine article reported, "He's come back with a batch of authentic sound effects for future use, among them the chimes of the Cathedral of Notre Dame, the roar of [an English] Channel storm and the characteristic sounds of European trains."

== Sponsor ==
As the title indicates, Philip Morris Playhouse was sponsored by Philip Morris, a cigarette company. The company was active in old-time radio, with one source reporting, "Philip Morris and Company was ... one of the most prolific sponsors of Radio throughout the Golden Age," sponsoring more than 40 programs over the years.

Having the company's name in the title essentially provided free advertising; every time the program's name appeared somewhere, it was more publicity for the Philip Morris company as well. The arrangement also had other effects, however. One history of old-time radio commented: "When a nationally known company sponsored a show, they were not only paying the bills, they were putting their image and reputation on the line. Especially if the show bore the name of the company.... So if there was any hanky-panky going on with the stars or with anyone connected with the show, it was a direct reflection of the prestige and image of the sponsoring product. Not only that – it hurt sales."

== Philip Morris Intercollegiate Acting Competition ==
In the 1950s, Philip Morris Playhouse On Broadway offered an unusual opportunity for college students. For three seasons, the Philip Morris Intercollegiate Acting Competition gave each winning student a role in one episode and $250 for the performance. Additionally, at the end of each season, one overall winner was selected. He or she received $2,000 and an opportunity to perform in a stage production. One website reported, "Reaching out to college campuses across the nation, Philip Morris Playhouse On Broadway afforded a total of forty-two aspiring thespians the chance to perform opposite some of the finest Film and Stage performers of the era." Robert Culp and James Garner were two of the competition's winners.

The competition was promoted via advertisements in newspapers on college campuses. In a typical ad, part of the text read,

ATTENTION ALL COLLEGE STUDENTS. Every Tuesday Evening over NBC, PHILIP MORRIS PLAYHOUSE presents an Outstanding College Student Featured with Famous Hollywood Stars in the PHILLIP MORRIS Intercollegiate Acting Competition.

== TV version ==
A short-lived television version of Philip Morris Playhouse ran on CBS from October 8, 1953, until March 4, 1954. Kent Smith was the host for the program, which one reference source said "was hastily ordered by sponsor Philip Morris after its first offering in that time slot, Pentagon Confidential, was blasted by the critics." Broadcast live from New York, the episodes' genres varied from comedy to melodrama. Stars included Eddie Albert, Nina Foch, Franchot Tone and Vincent Price. Joseph Papp served as director for the series as he had more TV experience than any of the directors from the radio version.

== Episodes ==
Selected episodes are listed below.

=== 1941 ===
Date	Title	Star
September 5	Yellow Jack	NA
September 12	One Way Passage	NA
September 19	Angels with Dirty Faces	Sylvia Sidney
September 26	A Man to Remember	NA
October 3	June Moon	Eddie Cantor
October 10	The Little Foxes	Tallulah Bankhead
October 17	Wuthering Heights	Raymond Massey and Sylvia Sidney
October 24	Night Must Fall	Maureen O'Sullivan and Burgess Meredith
October 31	My Favorite Wife	Madeleine Carroll and Burgess Meredith
November 7	Made for Each Other	Martha Scott
November 14	The Devil and Miss Jones	Lana Turner
November 21	Girl in the News	Joan Bennett
November 28	You Only Live Once	Burgess Meredith
December 5	Stage Door	Geraldine Fitzgerald

=== 1942 ===
Date	Title	Star
January 23	The Great McGinty	Brian Donlevy
February 13	Vivacious Lady	Madeleine Carroll
April 17	The Man Who Played God	Raymond Massey
June 12	No Time for Comedy	Melvyn Douglas
June 19	Take a Letter, Darling	Melvyn Douglas
June 26	Friendly Enemies	Charles Winninger, Charlie Ruggles
July 3	This Gun for Hire	Marlene Dietrich
July 10	The Man Who Came to Dinner	Monty Woolley
July 31	Man Hunt	Robert Montgomery
August 14	The Maltese Falcon	Edward Arnold

=== 1953 ===
- January 21, 1953 - "Candle Light" - Corinne Calvet
