= Spaghetti taco =

Taco variety

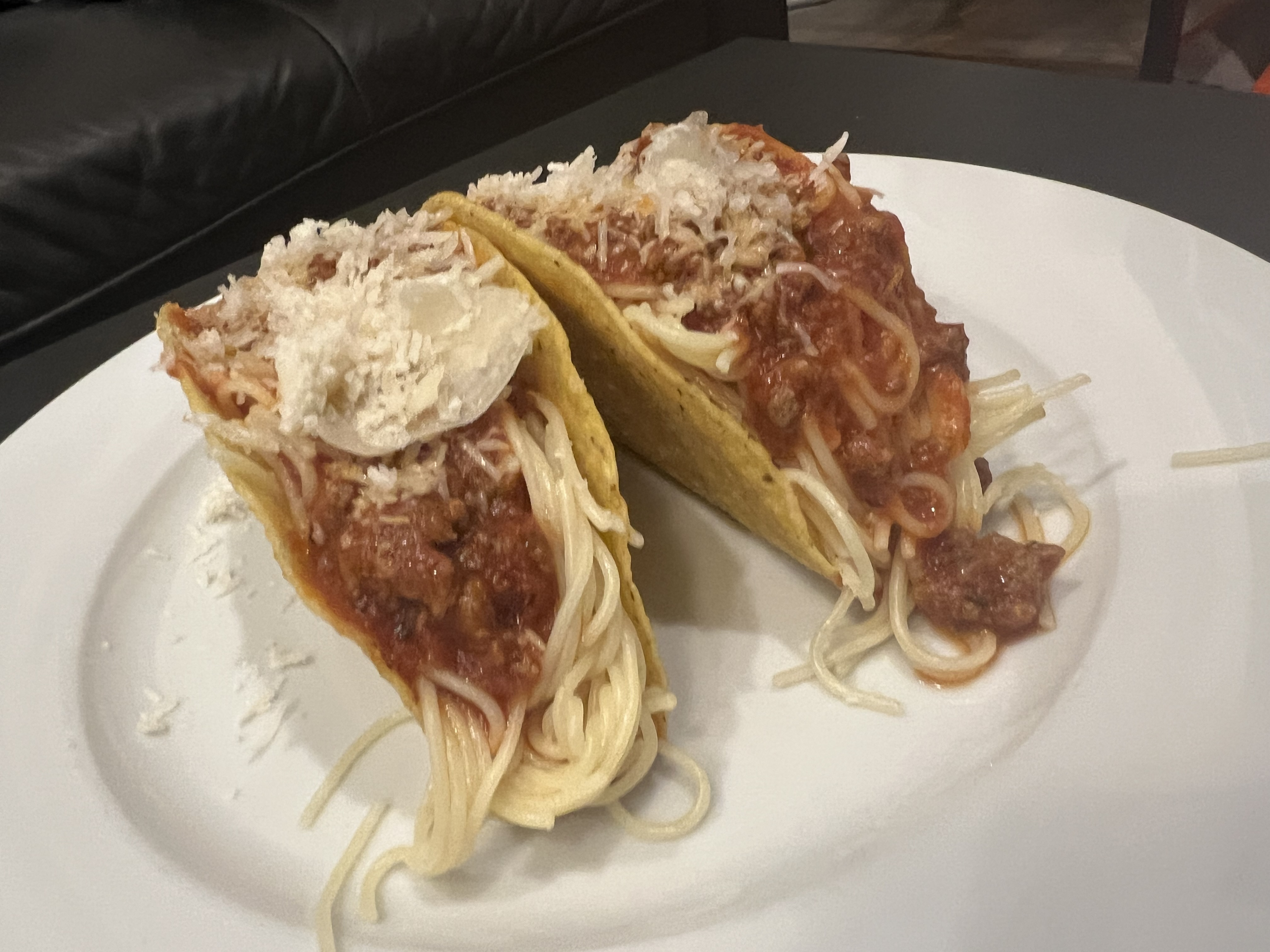
Spaghetti tacos with tomato sauce and cheese

Spaghetti tacos are a variety of taco that originated as a running joke on the Nickelodeon teen sitcom iCarly. The dish consists of spaghetti and tomato sauce inside hard taco shells. In the television show, spaghetti tacos were invented by the character Spencer Shay, the older brother of the titular character, in an episode that first aired in November 2007.

== Origins ==
Dan Schneider, the creator of iCarly, stated that he came up with the idea while writing the episode "iWill Date Freddie". In the show, it is stated that Spencer created the dish when he could not decide whether to make spaghetti or tacos for dinner. The joke then resurfaced in five additional episodes. The Season 3 episode "iCook" features a parody of food competition show Throwdown! with Bobby Flay in which the iCarly gang compete with fictional celebrity chef Ricky Flame to create the best spaghetti taco.

Although spaghetti tacos are most often described as an American invention, in 2012 New Yorker magazine described a spaghetti taco dish that was served at several restaurants operated in Tijuana, Mexico, by the family of Juan José Plascencias.

== Popularity ==
Spaghetti tacos became a fad among children and teens during the time iCarly aired, and were featured in The New York Times in 2010. Media scholar Robert Thompson of Syracuse University praised the dish, describing it as "an inevitability" and a "very important technological development" that made it possible for people to eat spaghetti without plates and in their car.

== Variations ==
Recipes for variations on spaghetti tacos include a spicy version on the Betty Crocker website called "Fiesta spaghetti tacos". Other recipes encourage cooks to smother the spaghetti tacos in guacamole, or to use Italian sausage and peppers.

There is even a recipe for a dessert version of spaghetti tacos, made with brownie mix, frosting, and preserved strawberries.

== See also ==
- Yakisoba-pan
