= Big Red =

Big Red may refer to:

== Entertainment ==
- Big Red (book), a book featuring the crew of the USS Nebraska
- Big Red (film), a 1962 Walt Disney film based on the novel by Jim Kjelgaard
- Big Red (sculpture), a 1974 sculpture in Eugene, Oregon, United States
- The Big Red, a 2012 album by John Williamson
- Big Red, a 2000 album by Hugh Blumenfeld
- Big Red, a 1945 novel by Jim Kjelgaard

== Products ==
- Big Red (drink), a brand of citrus-flavored cream soda
- Big Red (gum), a cinnamon-flavored gum made by Wrigley's
- Big Red (motorcycle), a land speed record streamliner
- Ford Big Red, a gas turbine powered truck concept
- Big Red or The Big Red Book, common nickname for the Betty Crocker Cookbook

== Sports ==
=== Horses ===
- Secretariat (horse)
- Man o' War
- Phar Lap
- Bonecrusher (horse)

=== Team mascots ===
- Big Red (University of Arkansas), University of Arkansas
- Big Red (Cardinals mascot), Arizona Cardinals
- Big Red (Lamar University), Lamar Cardinals
- Big Red (Western Kentucky University), Western Kentucky University
- Touchdown (mascot) (aka Big Red Bear), Cornell University
- Denison University
- Lawrenceville School (New Jersey)
- Plymouth High School
- Sacred Heart University
- Shippensburg University of Pennsylvania
- Steubenville High School (Ohio)
- Wayland Academy, Wisconsin

=== Players and coaches nicknames ===
- Seth McClung
- Andy Reid
- Bill Walton

=== Team nicknames ===
- Arizona Cardinals of the National Football League
- Cornell Big Red, Cornell University
- Glen Cove High School
- Indiana Hoosiers, at Indiana University
- Nebraska Cornhuskers, at the University of Nebraska
- Oklahoma Sooners, at the University of Oklahoma
- Phillips Exeter Academy

== Other uses ==
- Oracle Corporation, a software company
- Big Red (Chicago building) or 333 South Wabash
- Big red or Tiburonia granrojo, a species of jellyfish
- Gyromitra caroliniana or big red, a species of mushroom
- Holland Harbor Light or Big Red, the lighthouse at the entrance of a channel connecting Lake Michigan with Lake Macatawa
- Big Red or Nappanerica, a sand dune in the Simpson Desert, Australia
- Big Red, a set of subway cars on Boston's Red Line
- Big Red, a nickname for seven in the casino game of craps
- Big Red, a former professional wrestler with the Continental Wrestling Association
- Big Red, a commonly used nickname for tiktok influencer Alex Doherty

== See also ==
- Great Red Spot
