= Fashions on Parade =

American TV fashion series (1948–1949)

- Also known as: Television Fashions; Fashion Parade
- Genre: Fashion
- Presented by: Adelaide Hawley Cumming
- Country of origin: United States
- Original language: English
- No. of seasons: 1

Production
- Camera setup: Multi-camera
- Running time: 25 minutes

Original release
- Network: DuMont (1948-1949); ABC (1949)
- Release: November 4, 1948 – June 29, 1949

Fashions on Parade is an American fashion-themed television series that aired on the DuMont Television Network from November 4, 1948, to April 24, 1949, and on ABC from April 27, 1949, to June 29, 1949. The show was hosted by Adelaide Hawley.

== Overview ==
Fashions on Parade, "a half-hour fashion program with a variety formula" was one of the first television programs to focus on fashions. Each episode had models from the Conover agency as characters in a story that demonstrated "how good clothes and accessories contribute to daily living." Hawley narrated fashion segments, with Vincent Lopez playing the piano. The show also had a "wandering fantasy mannequin". On ABC, Bob Douglas and June Forrest provided music and the team of Russell and Aura performing interpretive dances.

The show was also broadcast under the titles Television Fashions and Fashion Parade.

== Episode status ==
Two episodes of the program (June 8, 1949, and a second 1949 episode) are held in the J. Fred MacDonald collection at the Library of Congress.

== Production ==
Charles Caplin and Leon Roth produced the program. Raymond Nelson was the director, and Elinor Lenz was the writer. The Dumont version was initially sponsored by several department stores but by December 1948 it was sponsored by Procter & Gamble; Lord & Taylor was the sponsor on ABC.

Hawley's work included selecting clothes and accessories for each week's episode from a wholesale market. In that role she sometimes had to convince salespeople that items might not look as good on TV as they did when seen in person. She did her narration from a booth in the studio, wearing headphones to hear the director while she watched a TV set to be sure that viewers were seeing what she was describing.

On Dumont, Fashions on Parade was broadcast on Fridays from 8 to 8:30 p.m. Eastern Time and "was top rated for 44 weeks". On ABC it was seen on Wednesdays from 9 to 9:30 p.m. E. T.

== USO-related promotion ==
A mystery-model contest in 1949 promoted the show, its sponsors, and the United Service Organizations (USO). "Who Is Miss Terry?" had six masked models walking on different parts of Fifth Avenue in New York City near stores that supplied merchandise shown on the program. The goal of the contest was "identifying Miss Terry, a well-known personality, by clues seen — but not heard — on the television show." People entered the contest by submitting slogans on the topic "Why Everyone Should Support the U. S. O." Mail from the contest was sent to the USO for its use, and entrants could win prizes. Those who submitted the three best slogans each week won merchandise worth $50. Correct identification of Miss Terry won the entrant "a complete wardrobe valued at $3,500."

== Critical response ==
Sponsor magazine wrote that the fashions on the show were "telecast beautifully" each week. It added, "The TV wedding of style and its upkeep is a natural for all concerned."

The trade publication Variety wrote in April 1948, "DuMont (WABD) has come up with a fashion show that makes sense." It complimented Hawley's work and the overall camerawork and production, but it added that the wandering mannequin and the dancers were "needless and useless". In July 1948, after Procter & Gamble became the sponsor, a Variety review pointed out problems in continuity and in integration of commercials. It said that continuity was needed to "not only tie the show into a coherent and cohesive pattern but give it snap, fluidity, and specific character." It noted that the commercials themselves were appealing, but that changes such as the sudden shift from falling snow in a commercial to "a scene of bright sunshine and summer attire" needed to be improved. When the show premiered on ABC, a review in Variety said that it lacked interest, focusing too much on fashion, and that the musical part of the program was not good enough to maintain viewers' interest. It said that the episode had "the flimsiest of story lines" and that the concept seemed to be more that of a printed publication than that of live video.

== See also ==
- List of programs broadcast by the DuMont Television Network
- List of surviving DuMont Television Network broadcasts
- 1948-49 United States network television schedule
- And Everything Nice

== Bibliography ==
- David Weinstein, The Forgotten Network: DuMont and the Birth of American Television (Philadelphia: Temple University Press, 2004) ISBN 1-59213-245-6
- Tim Brooks and Earle Marsh, The Complete Directory to Prime Time Network TV Shows, Third edition (New York: Ballantine Books, 1964) ISBN 0-345-31864-1
