= Betty Crocker Star Matinee =

American TV anthology series (1951–1952)

Betty Crocker Star Matinee is an American television anthology hosted by Adelaide Hawley under the General Mills persona of Betty Crocker. The program was aired from November 3, 1951, through April 26, 1952, on the American Broadcasting Company.

Adelaide Hawley portrayed the iconic Crocker in the series. Notable guest stars included Uta Hagen, Dane Clark Constance Bennett, Zachary Scott, Miriam Hopkins, Albert Dekker, Roland Young, Audrey Hepburn, David Niven, Veronica Lake, Basil Rathbone, June Lockhart, Raymond Massey, Thomas Mitchell, Teresa Wright, Celeste Holm, and Robert Cummings.

The program was initially broadcast from noon to 12:30 p.m. Eastern Time on Saturdays. The format consisted of "a dramatic excerpt, a recipe, and a female personality". Beginning March 1, 1952, it was moved to 11:30 to noon on Saturdays, replacing A Date with Judy.

Plays from which excerpts were performed include The Late Christopher Bean, featuring Thomas Mitchell, Eastward in Eden with Constance Bennett, and Mary Rose, starring Teresa Wright.
