= Betty Crocker =

Brand and fictional character

- Current owner: General Mills
- Country: United States
- Introduced: 1921; 105 years ago
- Markets: Worldwide
- Website: www.bettycrocker.com

Betty Crocker is a brand and fictional character used in advertising campaigns for food and recipes. The character was created by the Washburn-Crosby Company in 1921 to give a personalized response to consumer product questions. In 1954, General Mills introduced the red spoon logo with her signature, placing it on Gold Medal flour, Bisquick, and cake-mix packages. A portrait of Betty Crocker appears on printed advertisements, product packaging, and cookbooks.

The character was developed in 1921 following a Gold Medal Flour promotion featured in the Saturday Evening Post. The ad asked consumers to complete a jigsaw puzzle and mail it to the then Washburn-Crosby Company, later General Mills, in Minneapolis, Minnesota. In return, they would receive a pincushion shaped like a bag of flour. Along with 30,000 completed puzzles came several hundred letters with cooking-related questions.

Realizing that especially housewives would want advice from a fellow woman, the company’s Advertising Department convinced its board of directors to create a personality that the women answering the letters could all use in their replies. The name Betty was selected because it was viewed as a cheery, all-American name. It was paired with the last name Crocker, in honor of William Crocker, a Washburn Crosby Company director.

A portrait of Betty Crocker painted by Neysa McMein was commissioned in 1936. It has since been updated seven times, reflecting changes in fashion and hairstyles.

Described as an American cultural icon, the image of Betty Crocker has endured several generations, adapting to changing social, political, and economic currents. Apart from advertising campaigns in printed, broadcast and digital media, she received several cultural references in film, literature, music and comics.

== Creation ==
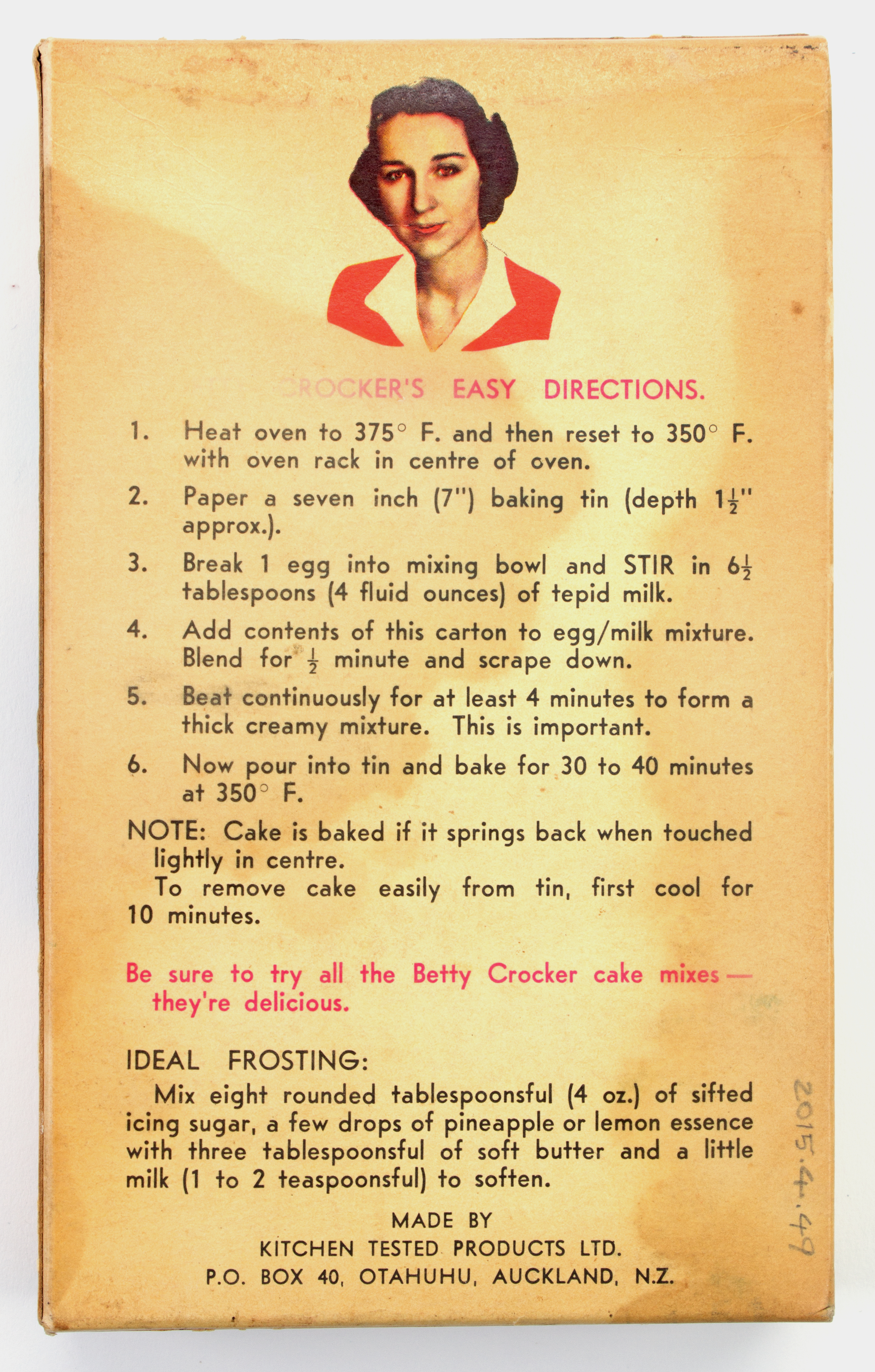
Image of Betty Crocker on the back of a box of pineapple cake mix, New Zealand, 1940-70s

Betty Crocker was created in 1921 by Washburn-Crosby and advertising executive Bruce Barton. Crocker was based on a sous-chef from Franklin College — where Barton attended school — who made the delicious, if somewhat dry, baked goods for the cafeteria. Under Marjorie Husted's supervision, the image of Betty Crocker became an icon for General Mills. In 1928, Washburn Crosby merged with other milling companies to form General Mills.

In 1924, Crocker acquired a voice with the debut of The Betty Crocker Cooking School of the Air on one station in Minneapolis. It was the country's first radio cooking program. Blanche Ingersoll followed by Husted was selected to portray Betty Crocker. The show proved popular and eventually was carried nationally on NBC Radio, with Agnes White Tizard as Betty. Over the next three decades, the women would anonymously portray Betty Crocker on the air and at cooking schools.

In 1929, Betty Crocker coupons were introduced. Inserted in bags of flour, they could be used to reduce the cost of Oneida Limited flatware. By 1932, this scheme had become so popular that General Mills began to offer an entire set of flatware; the pattern was called "Friendship" (later renamed "Medality"). In 1937, the coupons were printed on the outside of packages, copy on which told purchasers to "save and redeem for huge savings on fine kitchen and home accessories in our catalog".

The character made its packaging debut in 1937, appearing on Softasilk cake flour. The name appeared in various Gold Medal products but its first brand name appearance came in 1941 on soup mixes.

== Cookbooks ==
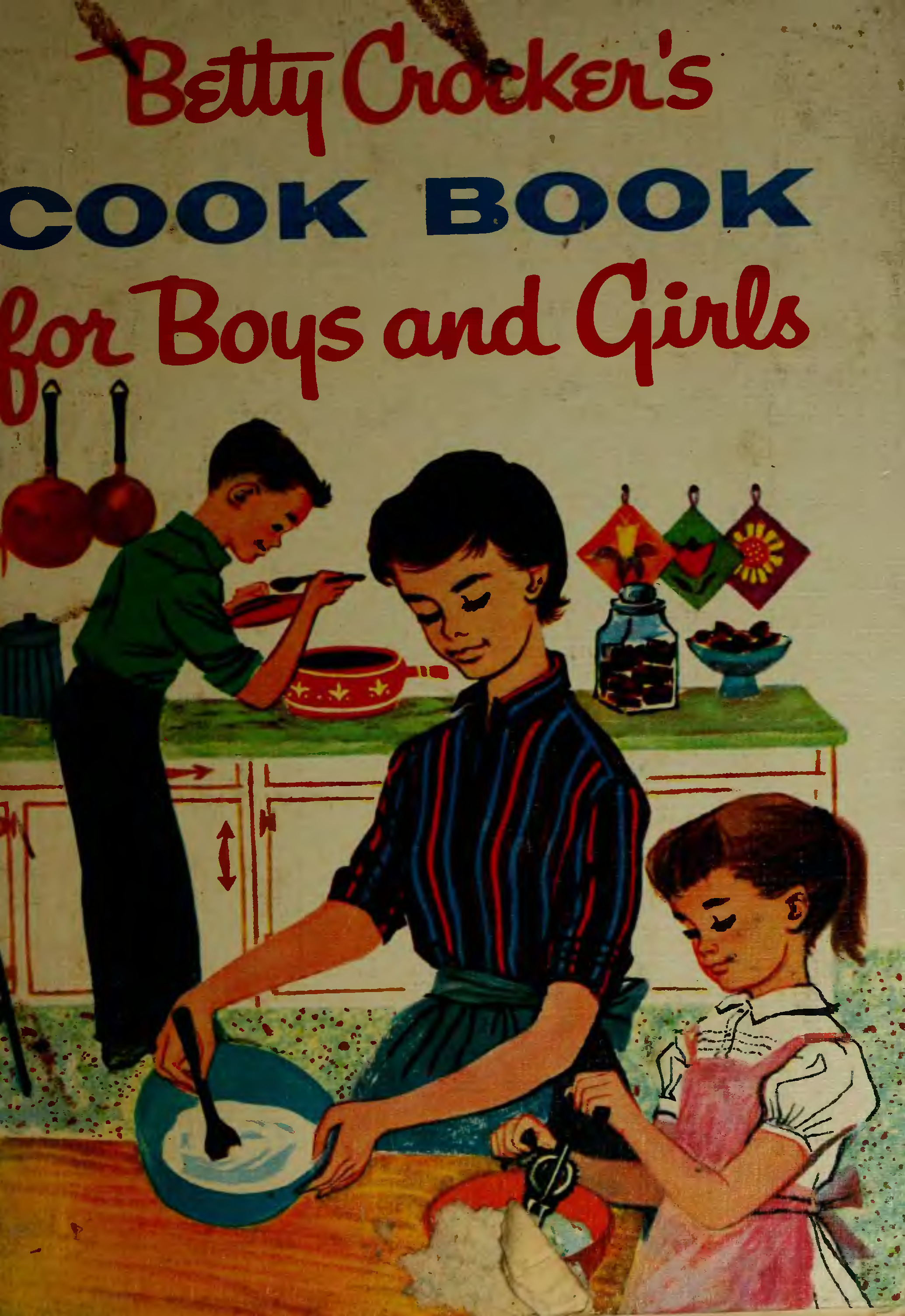
Coverpage of cookbook

From 1930, General Mills issued softbound recipe books, including, in 1933, Betty Crocker's 101 Delicious Bisquick Creations, as Made and Served by Well-Known Gracious Hostesses, Famous Chefs, Distinguished Epicures and Smart Luminaries of Movieland.

The Betty Crocker Cook Book of All-Purpose Baking was published as an aid to wartime considerations in cooking.

In 1950, the first hardcover recipe cookbook was published, entitled Betty Crocker Picture Cookbook. It was written by nutritionist Agnes White Tizard.

In 2005, the 10th edition of the Betty Crocker cookbook was published, as well as a Spanish/English bilingual book that collects some of the more common recipes for Spanish-speaking readers looking to cook American-style food. An 11th edition, in ring-binder format, appeared in 2011. At least 17 other Betty Crocker recipe collections were also in print in 2015.

== Media ==
Betty Crocker programs first appeared on radio on local stations in 1924. The first network Betty Crocker broadcast was on NBC in 1926. The show remained on network radio until 1953; most of the time the program was on NBC or CBS, but it was on ABC from 1947 to 1953.

Betty Crocker was portrayed by several actresses, including Marjorie Husted on radio for twenty years, and Adelaide Hawley Cumming on television between 1949 and 1964. Cumming appeared for several years on The George Burns and Gracie Allen Show, and had a TV show, Betty Crocker Star Matinee. She also appeared in the CBS network's first color commercial, in which she baked a "mystery fruit cake". Hawley continued to portray Betty Crocker until 1964.

A portrait of Betty Crocker painted by Neysa McMein was commissioned in 1936 to commemorate the 15th anniversary of the character, although earlier portraits of the character had already been used in General Mills publications attributed to Crocker. McMein's rendering presented a "motherly image" that "blended the features of several Home Service Department members". Her image was updated over the years to remain appealing and relevant to new audiences, but always accommodated General Mills' cultural perception of the American homemaker as knowledgeable and caring. The 1996 portrait of Betty Crocker, according to General Mills, was partially inspired by a "computerized composite" of "75 women of diverse backgrounds and ages." These portraits were always painted, without the use of any specific model.

In 1945, Fortune magazine named Betty Crocker the second most popular woman in America (to then First Lady Eleanor Roosevelt). In the same year, Fortune "outed" Betty Crocker as a fictitious creation, calling her a "fake" and a "fraud."

== Legacy ==
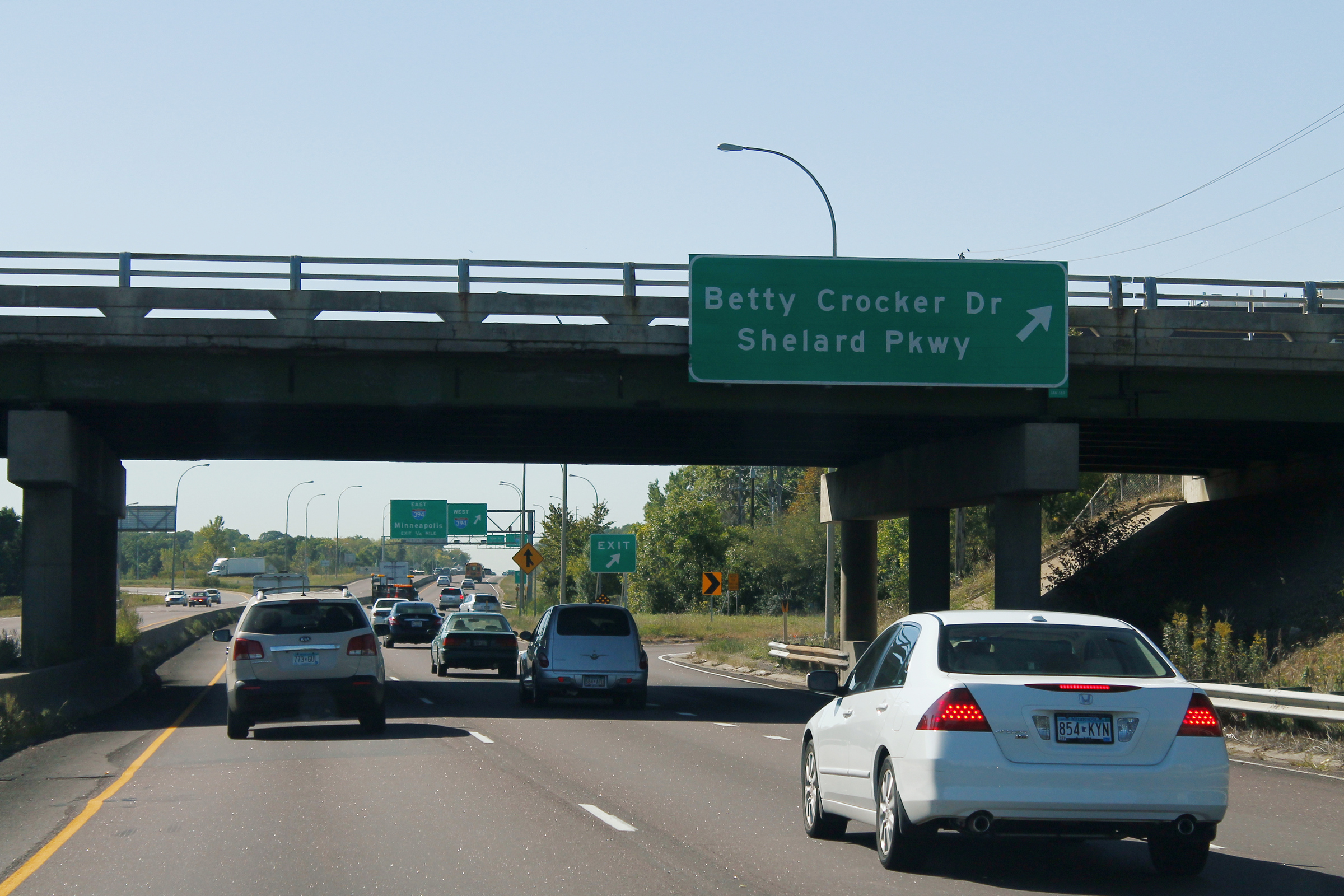
Betty Crocker Drive, Minnesota

The Minneapolis suburb of Golden Valley, Minnesota, where General Mills is headquartered, has a street named Betty Crocker Drive.

In 2006, the Betty Crocker catalog operation went out of business with all of its inventory on sale. Points were redeemable until December 15, 2006. Afterward, unused points were available to be converted into discounts for a small period thereafter on a short-lived website.

== Products ==
- Bac-Os (discontinued in 2016)
- Betty Crocker Brownie bar
- Betty Crocker Cookbook
- Betty Crocker baking mixes
- Fruit Roll-Ups
- Betty Crocker canned frosting
- Bowl Appetit shelf-stable entrees
- Betty Crocker Soda Licious (discontinued)
- Cake and dessert decorating products
- Dunk-a-roos
- Fruit by the Foot
- Fruit Gushers
- Potato Buds instant mashed potatoes
- "Shake and make" pancake mix
- Warm Delights microwavable desserts

== See also ==
- Betty Bossi
- Betty Crocker Kitchens
- Mavis Beacon (character)
