= Betty Crocker Kitchens =

Division of General Mills's test kitchens

The Betty Crocker Kitchens is a division and part of the test kitchens at the world headquarters of General Mills in Golden Valley, Minnesota, operator of the Betty Crocker brand. They are modeled after and equipped like a kitchen that would be found in an American home, since the company's products and recipes tested are intended for home use. Marjorie Husted, an economist hired by the Washburn-Crosby company, was not only a key player in developing the persona of Betty Crocker but also recognized the subtle difference in how home cooks measured and approached recipes compared to how these recipes were made in the test kitchens. Based on her cooking instruction experience, Hustad felt that Betty Crocker's recipes need to be reliable and fool-proof for the home cook. She passed her observations on to the company's research department.

The kitchens were remodeled in 2003 and the facility contains 19 individual kitchens.

== History ==
Originally, the test kitchens were used as a testing grounds for the Gold Medal flour produced by the then Washburn-Crosby company (later to become General Mills). The test kitchens became formally known as the “Betty Crocker Kitchens” in 1946. In 1958, seven new kitchens were built in the General Mills headquarters in Golden Valley, MN.

The 1950 edition of Betty Crocker's Picture Cookbook introduction contains the evolution of the kitchen in general and discusses the testing done to create the cookbook. For example, they tested Gold Medal flour from mills across the country in the recipes to assure success for the baker at home and to help “anyone appreciate the care and thought and science which is back of [the] products”. This indicates the “careful testing and checking, experimenting and planning” that occurs in the Betty Crocker test kitchens.
