= And Everything Nice =

- Genre: Fashion
- Presented by: Maxine Barrat
- Country of origin: United States
- Original language: English
- No. of seasons: 2

Production
- Camera setup: Multi-camera
- Running time: 25 minutes

Original release
- Network: DuMont
- Release: March 15, 1949 – January 2, 1950

And Everything Nice is an American fashion-themed television program that was broadcast on the DuMont Television Network from March 8, 1949, through January 9, 1950. The program was hosted by Maxine Barratt.

== Overview ==
Barrat chatted with guests and presented fashion tips for women of the 1940s. The program, produced and distributed by DuMont, aired live:

- Tuesdays at 7 pm ET on most DuMont affiliates during the 1948-1949 television season;
- Mondays at 8:30 pm ET in July and August 1949;
- Mondays at 9 pm ET from September 1949 to January 1950.

The series was cancelled in early 1950, and was one of several low-budget fashion programs, such as Fashions on Parade, broadcast by the DuMont network.

Features of the program included "how to have a wardrobe for either $1.98 or $1098."

Bob Loewi was the show's packager and director. Conover Career Girls modeled clothes on the show.

== Episode status ==
A single kinescope of this series survives at the Paley Center for Media in New York City.

== See also ==
- List of programs broadcast by the DuMont Television Network
- List of surviving DuMont Television Network broadcasts
- 1949-50 United States network television schedule
- Fashions on Parade

== Bibliography ==
- David Weinstein, The Forgotten Network: DuMont and the Birth of American Television (Philadelphia: Temple University Press, 2004) ISBN 1-59213-245-6
- Alex McNeil, Total Television, Fourth edition (New York: Penguin Books, 1980) ISBN 0-14-024916-8
