= Yakisoba =

Japanese fried noodle dish

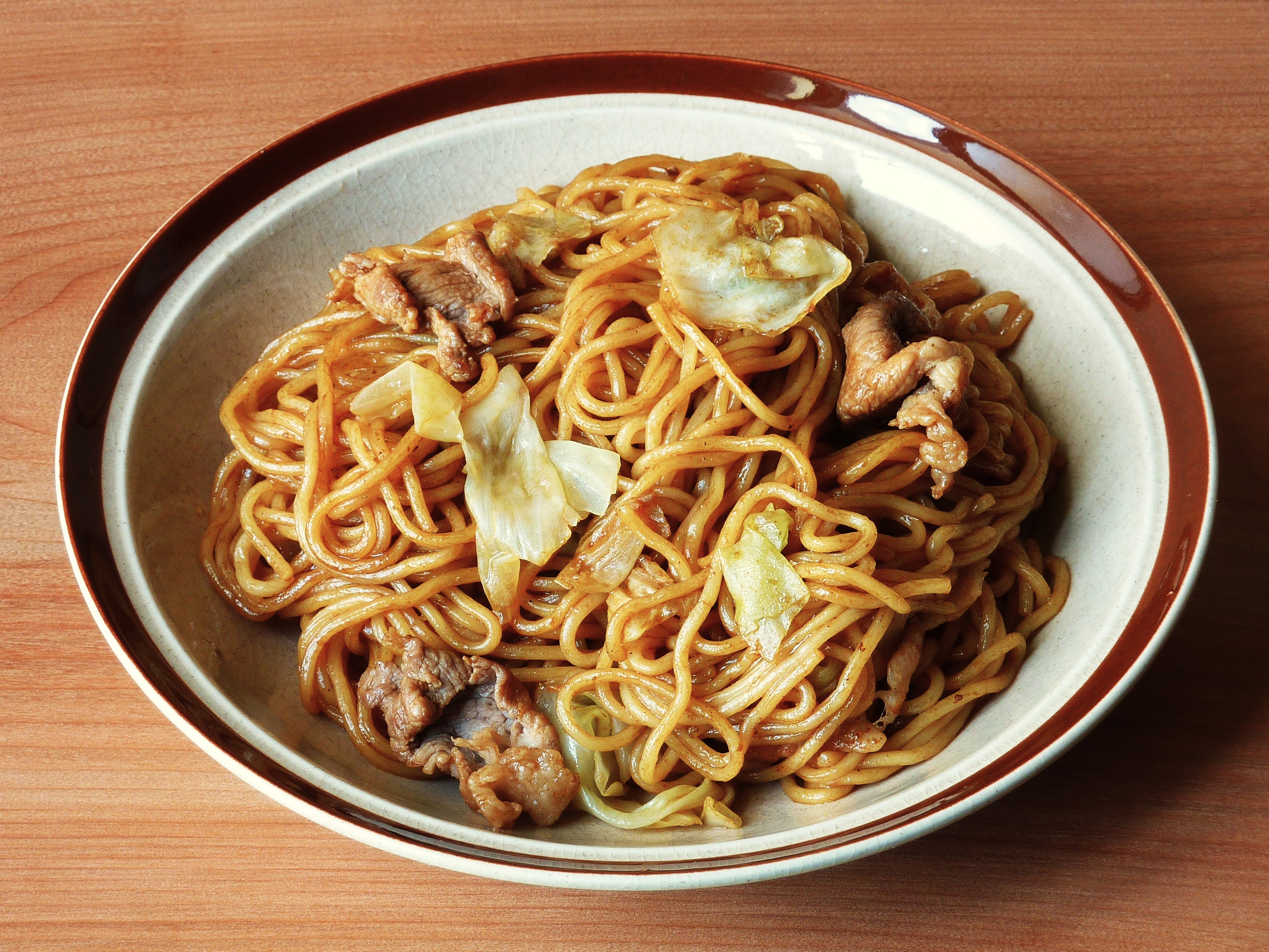
- Type: Japanese noodles
- Place of origin: Japan
- Main ingredients: Chinese-style noodles (jp) (wheat flour), Worcestershire sauce, pork, vegetables (usually cabbage, onions, and carrots)
- Variations: Sara udon, yaki udon

Yakisoba (Japanese: 焼きそば, [jakiꜜsoba], transl. 'fried noodle') is a Japanese noodle stir-fried dish. Usually, soba noodles are made from buckwheat flour, but soba in yakisoba are Chinese-style noodles (chuuka men) made from wheat flour, typically flavored with a condiment similar to Worcestershire sauce. Yakisoba originated as a type of okonomiyaki.

All over Japan, there are many shinise (long-established) yakisoba and okonomiyaki restaurants that have been serving the dish for a long time, and each region has its own unique local gourmet (jp) yakisoba.

== History ==
From around 1907, during the Meiji era, a large number of Chinese restaurants featuring Chinese chefs dispatched from Yokohama Chinatown, as well as eateries serving shina soba (the precursor to ramen), began opening in Asakusa, Tokyo. Some of these chefs had been forced to leave the United States due to the Chinese Exclusion Act of 1882 and came to Japan seeking work. From the late Meiji through the Taishō era, the number of Japanese yatai (street food stalls) specializing in shina soba increased, and the Chinese-style noodles use for them became familiar to Tokyoites.

Meanwhile, around 1897, also during the Meiji era, street stalls selling teppanyaki began appearing. These dishes were inspired by tempura and involved grilling ingredients like squid, shrimp, and ginger mixed with flour and water. This style of cooking became the prototype for okonomiyaki-like dishes.

It is believed that yakisoba first appeared around 1918 at street stalls specializing in dondonyaki (jp) for children (the precursor to okonomiyaki) around the late Taishō to the early Shōwa era (c. 1920s). It used the same sauce and ingredients as dondonyaki but substituted the relatively cheaper Chinese-style noodles for wheat flour ones, the price of which had soared due to the 1918 Rice riots.

In 1935, during the Shōwa era, street food stalls specializing in Worcestershire sauce-flavored yakisoba gained popularity in Tokyo, and the dish was also served at okonomiyaki restaurants in Asakusa, where it was considered a local specialty.

After Japan's WWII defeat in 1945, Japanese repatriates (jp) returning from Japan's overseas territories ate yakisoba at black markets in Tokyo. This led to the dish spreading to their hometowns, gradually extending its popularity throughout Japan.

== Preparation ==
Yakisoba is prepared by stir-frying steamed Chinese-style noodles with bite-sized slices of pork and small pieces of vegetables such as cabbage, onions, bean sprouts, and carrots. It is then flavored with Japanese-style Worcestershire sauce, salt, and pepper. It is served with garnishes such as beni shōga (shredded pickled ginger), and with toppings such as aonori (seaweed powder) and katsuobushi (bonito fish flakes), and may be accompanied by Japanese-style mayonnaise.

== Serving ==
Yakisoba can be served on a plate either as a main dish or a side dish.

In Japan, noodles piled into a bun sliced down the middle and garnished with mayonnaise and shreds of red pickled ginger are called yakisoba-pan (pan meaning "bread") and are commonly available at convenience stores and school canteens.

Sometimes udon is used as a replacement for the Chinese-style noodles and called yaki udon. It has been eaten in the Kansai region since before WWII. At that time, Chinese noodles were difficult to obtain there.

== Gallery ==
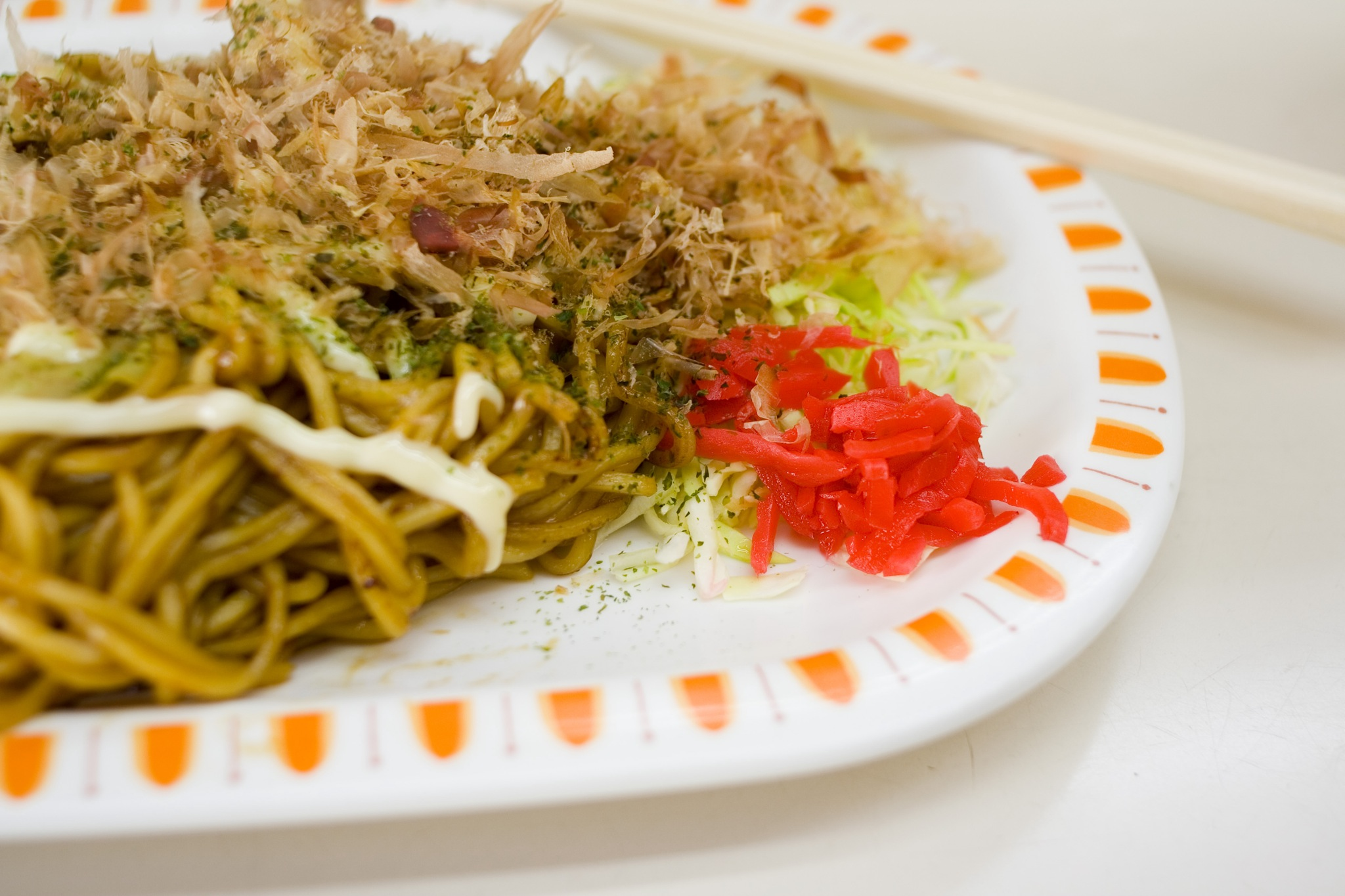
Yakisoba

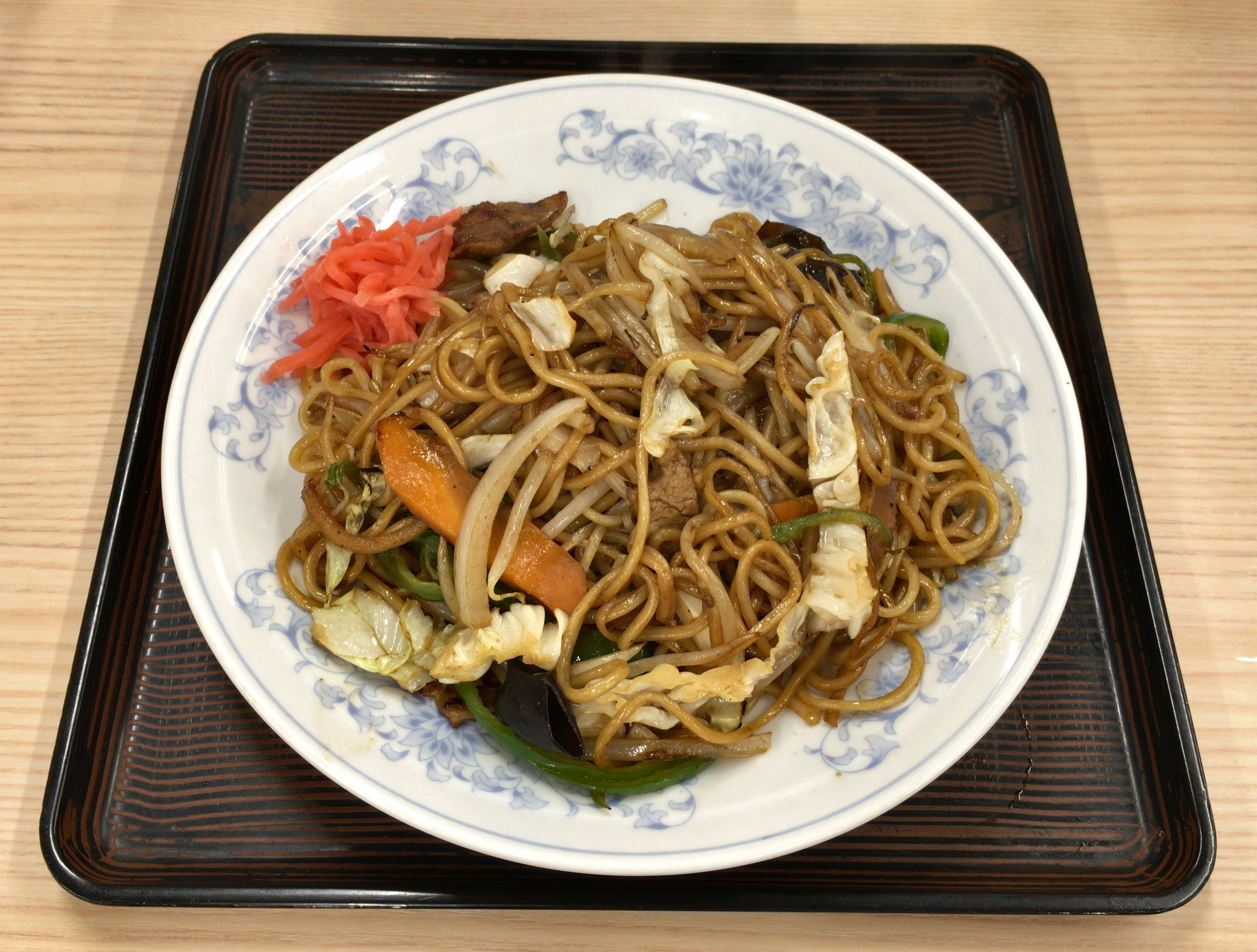
Yakisoba

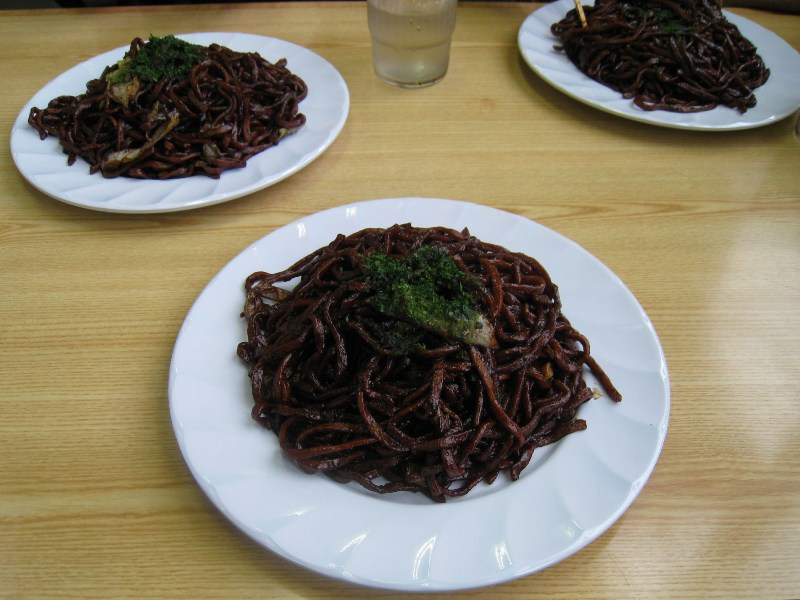
Ōta-yakisoba

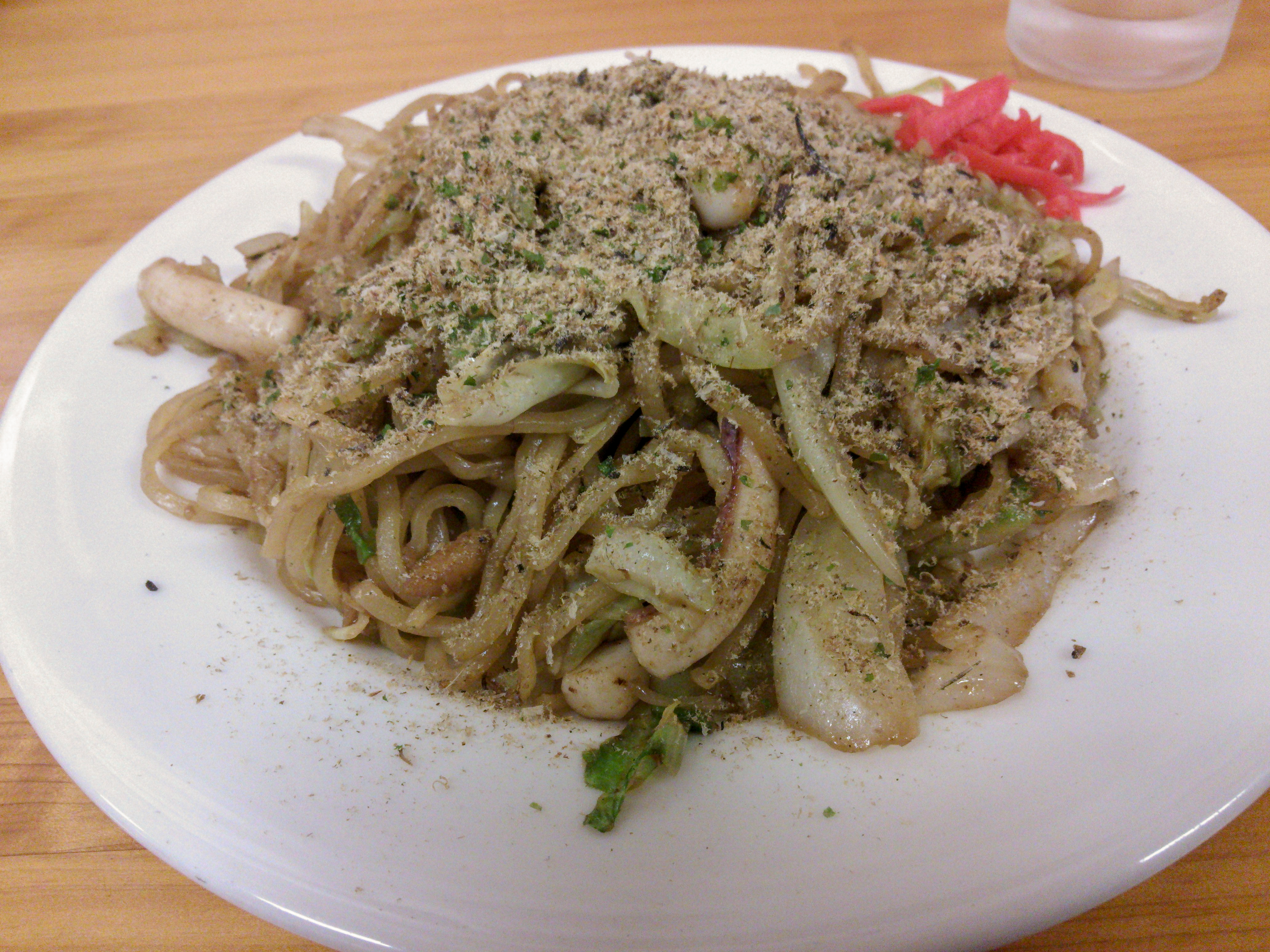
Fujinomiya yakisoba

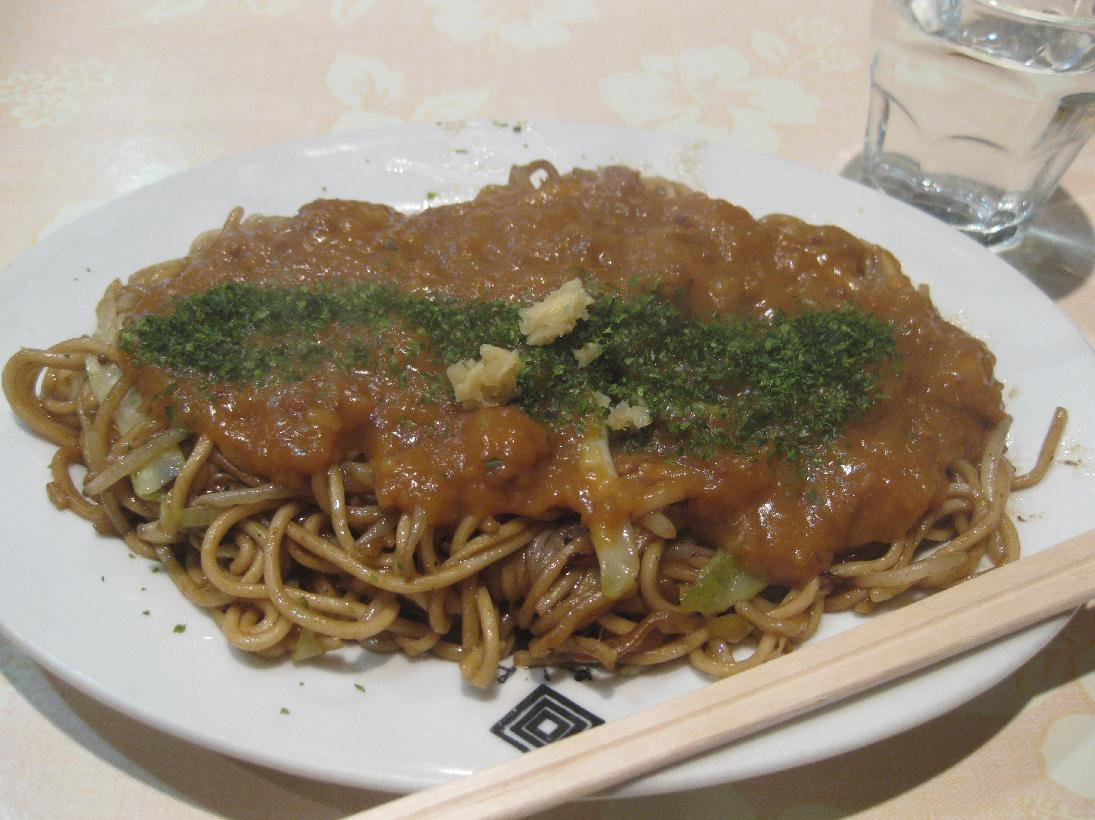
Italian yakisoba (shiga)

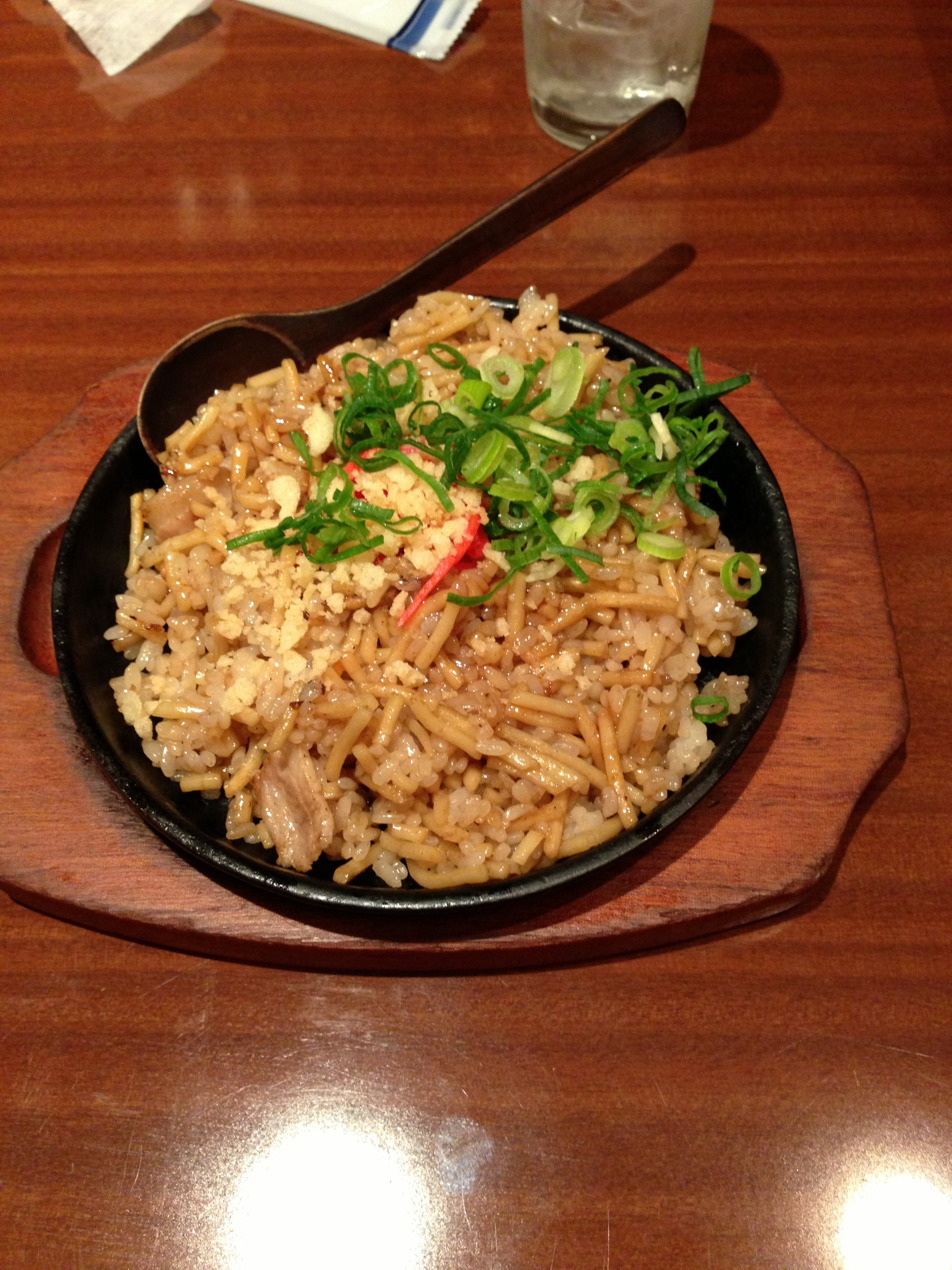
Sobameshi

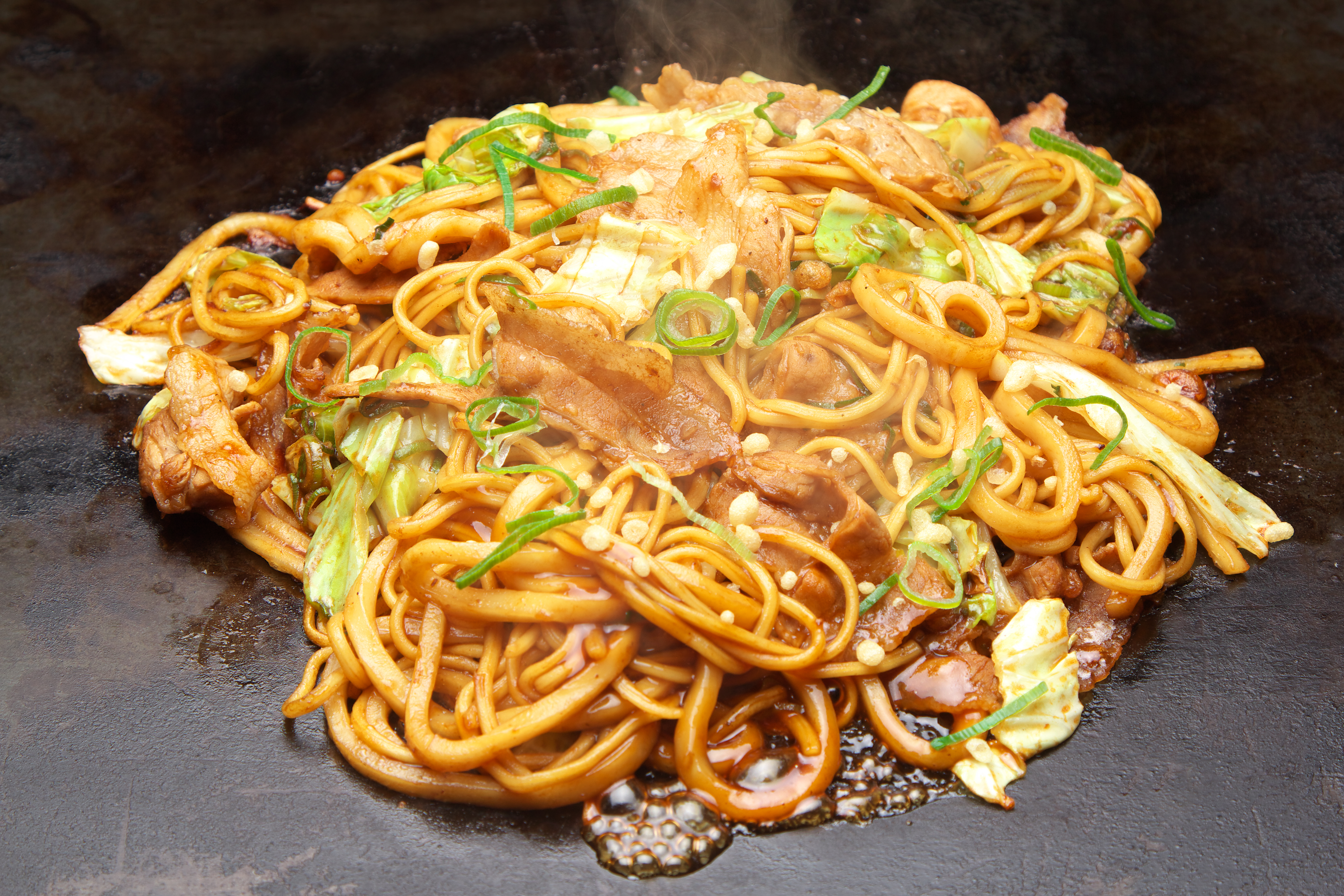
Himeji-chanpon yaki

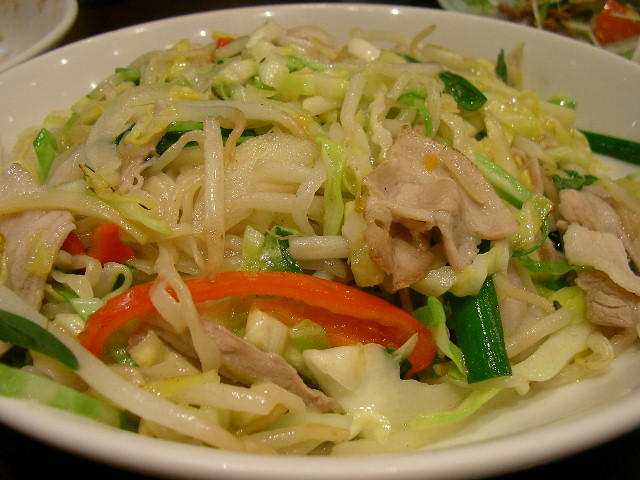
Shio yakisoba

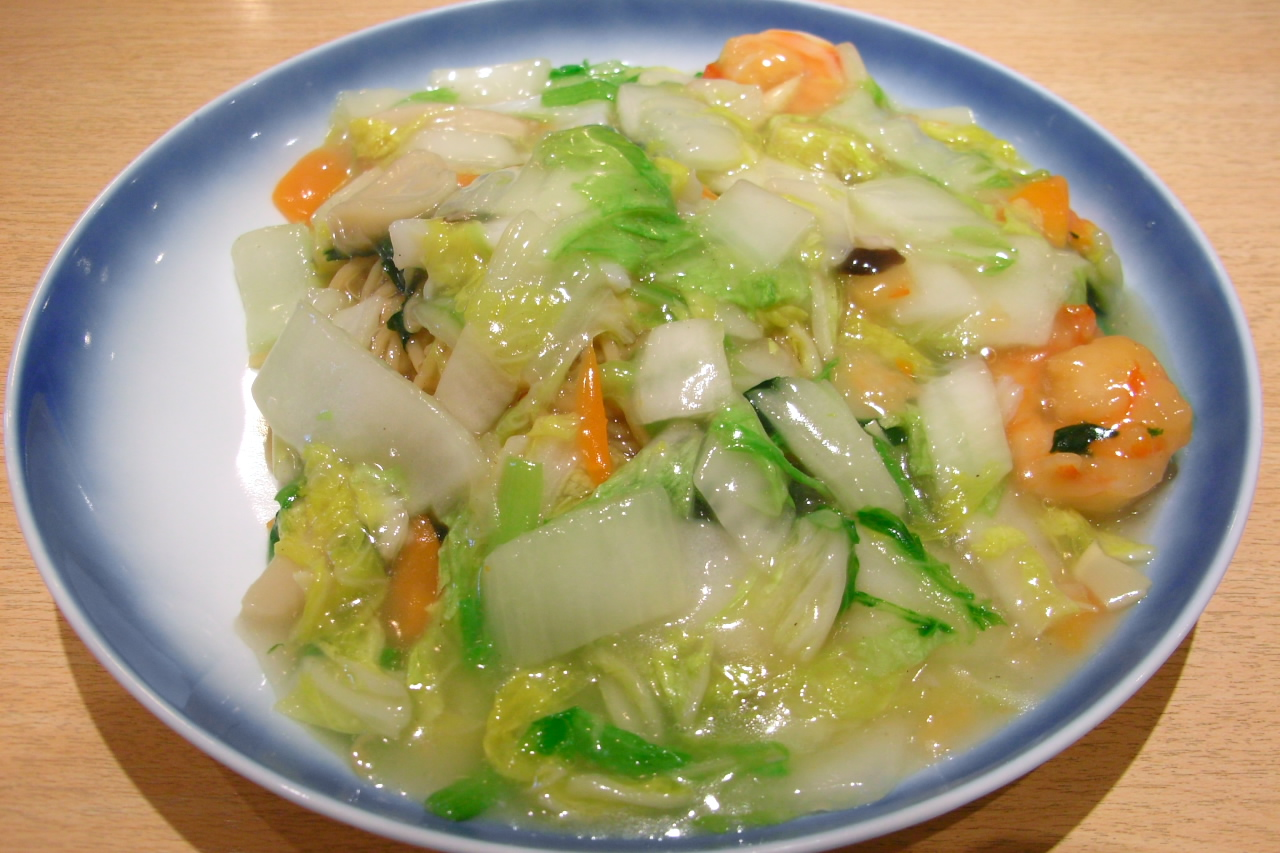
Ankake yakisoba

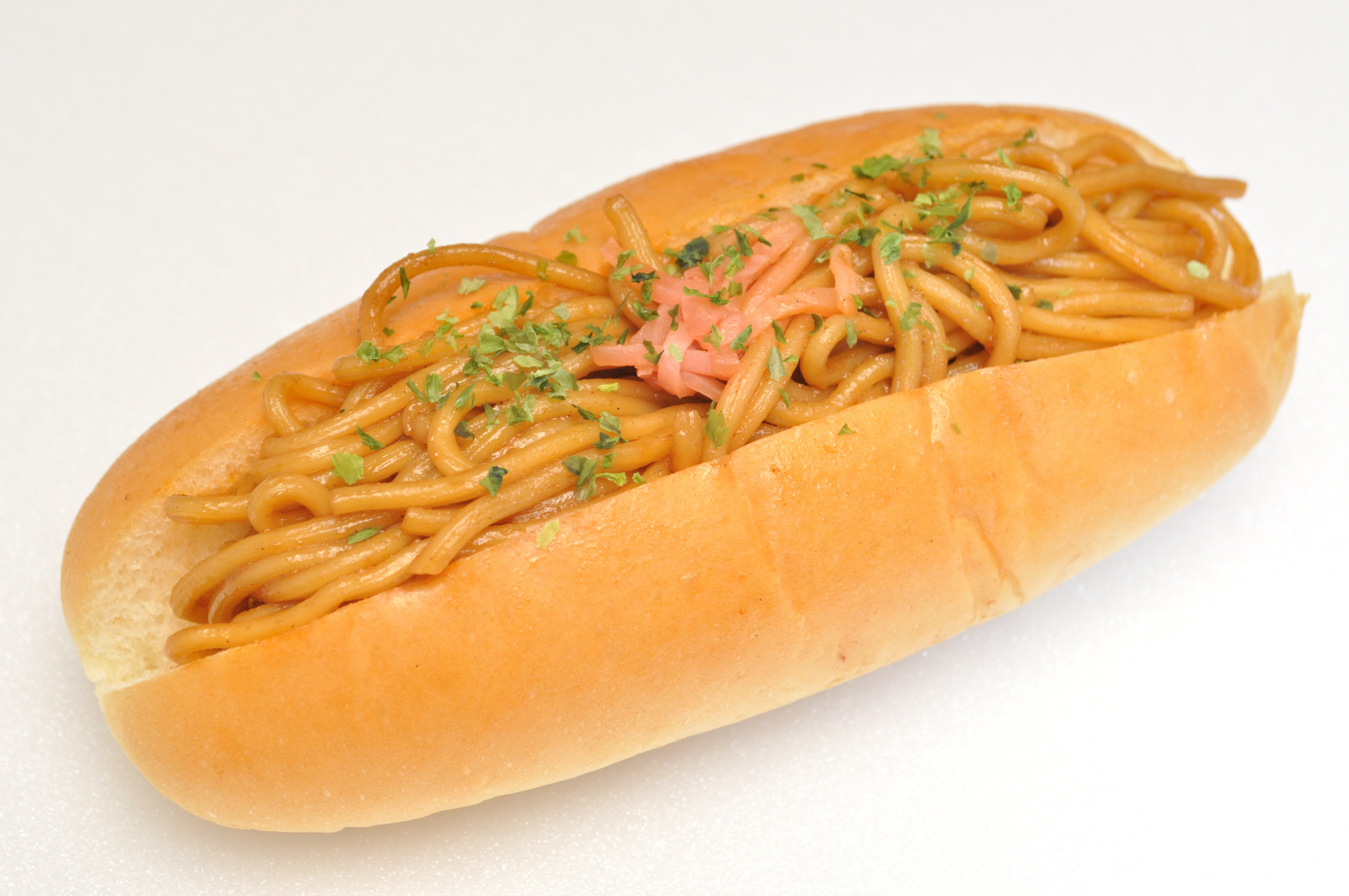
Yakisoba-pan

== See also ==
- Chow mein – Chinese stir-fried noodles
- Cup Yakisoba (jp) – Instant yakisoba
- Teppanyaki – a style of Japanese cuisine that uses an iron griddle to cook foods such as yakisoba

== Sources ==
- Shiozaki, Shogo (2023). ソース焼きそばの謎 [The Mystery of Sauce Yakisoba]. Hayakawa Shinsho (in Japanese). Hayakawa Publishing. ISBN 978-4-15-340006-1.
- Shiozaki, Shogo (2023). あんかけ焼きそばの謎 [The Mystery of Ankake Yakisoba]. Hayakawa Shinsho (in Japanese). Hayakawa Publishing. ISBN 978-4-15-340031-3.
