= Yakisoba-pan =

Japanese bread roll with fried wheat noodle fillings

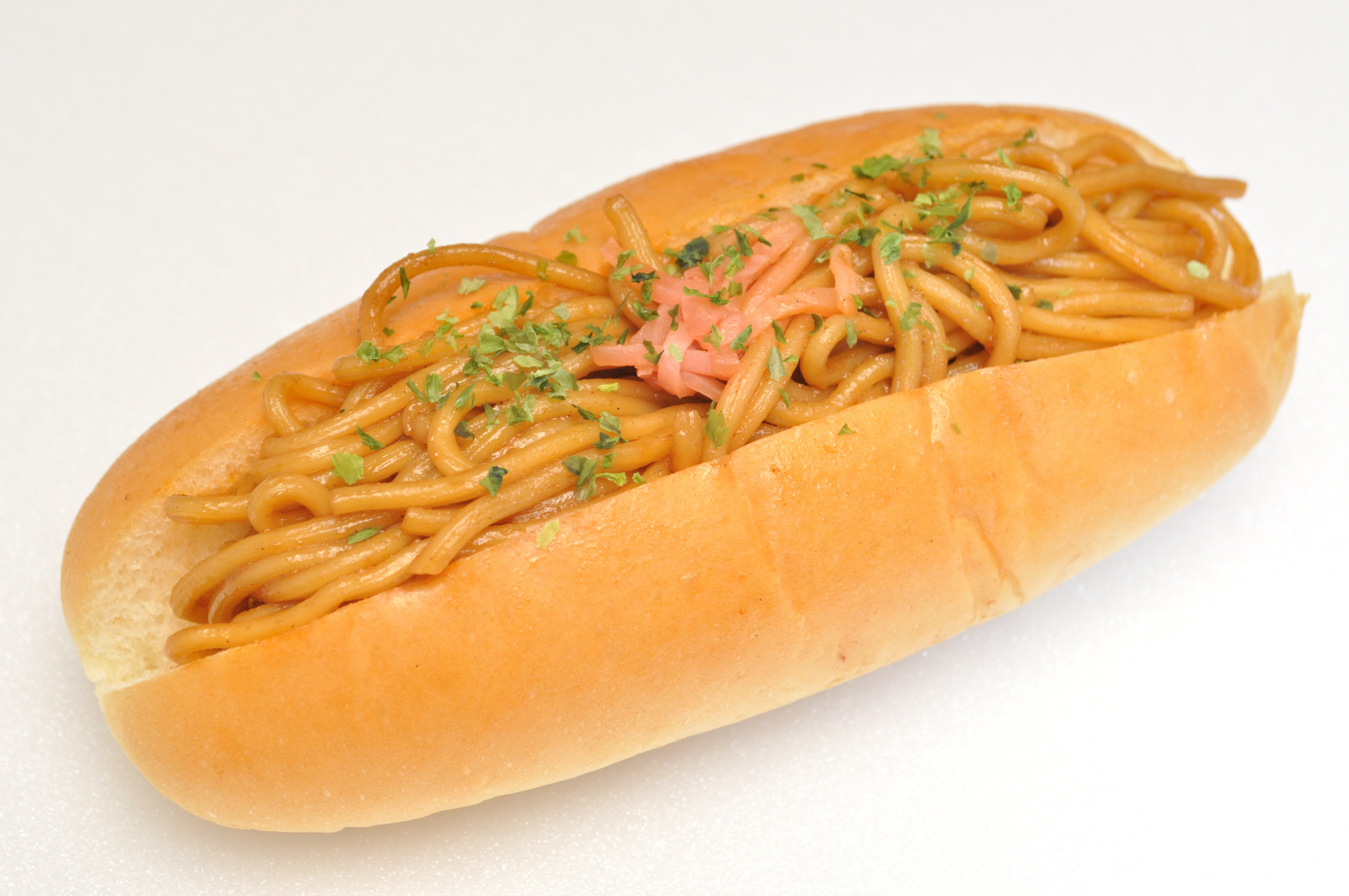
A Japanese yakisoba-pan sandwich

Yakisoba-pan (焼きそばパン) is a popular Japanese food in which yakisoba is sandwiched between an oblong white bread roll resembling an American hotdog bun known as koppe-pan. This high-carbohydrate food item is essentially a sandwich with a filling of fried wheat noodles. Omura describes it succinctly as a "Japanese noodle bun". Behymer more loosely terms it a "spaghetti sandwich" and it has also been portrayed as a Japanese stir-fried noodle sandwich. Moreover, scenes of young people eating this high-carb food in Japanese films such as "Hanataba mitaina koi o shita" (花束みたいな恋をした; I fell in love like a bouquet) or "Shitsuren meshi" [失恋めし, Heartbreak on a Plate] further attest to its cultural ubiquity in Japan.

== History and variants ==
There are various theories about the origin of yakisoba-pan. Most concur that it took off during the 1950s. In that era, the United States flooded Japanese markets with cheap flour products; by 1955, it was appearing in department stores in Tokyo and soon nationwide. Today, yakisoba-pan is widely sold in convenience stores and bakeries, not only in Japan but also in some overseas locations, as well as school canteens.

Numerous variations of this product exist in terms of seasonings, noodle thickness, and noodle length. Some versions of yakisoba-pan come with red pickled ginger and mayonnaise. Others feature a bit of parsley or lettuce. Since its ingredients tend to be cheap, this product is generally inexpensive.

== See also ==
- List of Japanese dishes
- List of sandwiches
- Spaghetti sandwich
- Chow mein sandwich
- Chip butty
- Spaghetti taco
- Vada pav
