= Chow mein sandwich =

Regional sandwich of southeastern Massachusetts

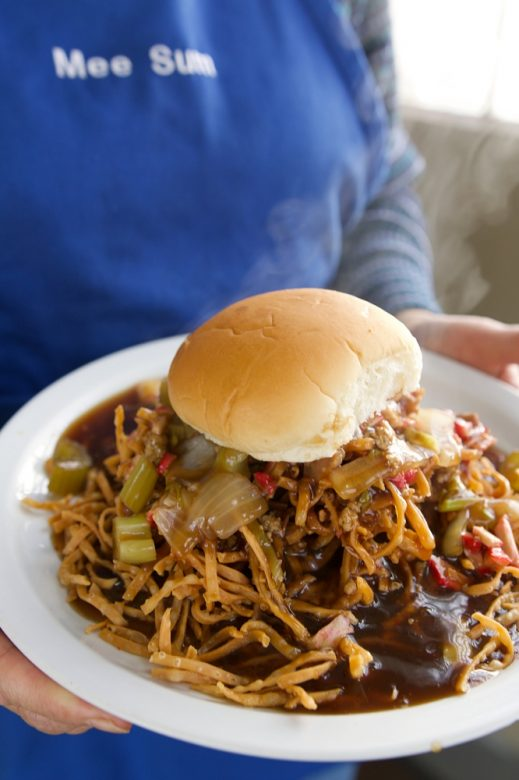
- Type: Sandwich
- Place of origin: United States
- Region or state: Fall River, Massachusetts
- Serving temperature: Hot
- Main ingredients: Hamburger-style bun, chow mein

The chow mein sandwich typically consists of a brown gravy-based chow mein mixture placed between halves of a hamburger-style bun, and is popular on Chinese-American restaurant menus throughout southeastern Massachusetts and parts of neighboring Rhode Island. Originating in Fall River, Massachusetts, in the 1930s or 1940s, the sandwich is not well known outside of a relatively small area of New England.

This sandwich was created to provide a low-cost meal in an economically depressed region inhabited by recent immigrants from Europe and Canada while providing it in a form with which they were already familiar. Even the gravy has been modified to be very similar to that used in typical New England cooking.

These sandwiches are sometimes served outside of Chinese American restaurants by the food services in local area schools and senior citizens' centers. Celebrity chef and Fall River native Emeril Lagasse has also publicized this sandwich, along with food writers Jane and Michael Stern.

The sandwiches are served "strained" or "unstrained", referring to whether or not the sandwich has vegetables. "Strained" means that it is served without vegetables. Just like plated chow mein without the bun, the sandwich may also include meats or seafood, usually chicken, beef, or shrimp. The Oriental Chow Mein Noodle Company of Fall River is the regional source for the sandwich's distinctive crispy noodles.

These sandwiches can be found in the cities of Fall River, New Bedford, and Taunton in Massachusetts; and in the cities of Woonsocket, Pawtucket and Tiverton in Rhode Island. Although the sandwich is mostly unknown in nearby Boston, it was on the menu at the more distant Coney Island location of Nathan's Famous in Brooklyn, New York as recently as 2013.

== See also ==
- St. Paul sandwich, a Midwestern American sandwich with Chinese food influence
- American Chinese cuisine
- Bánh mì, the Vietnamese-French style of sandwich
- List of American sandwiches
- List of sandwiches
- Yakisoba-pan, similar Japanese noodle sandwich
- Spaghetti sandwich
