= Agnes White Tizard =

American cookbook author and nutrition consultant (1895–1979)

- Born: Agnes Chloe White; July 10, 1895; Illinois, U.S.
- Died: March 28, 1979 (aged 83); Valley Center, California, U.S.
- Occupations: Home economist; nutritionist; radio voice artist; cookbook author
- Known for: Radio voice of brand character "Betty Crocker", mascot for General Mills

Agnes White Tizard (July 10, 1895 – March 28, 1979) was an American home economist and nutrition consultant who worked for General Mills and was associated with the brand character Betty Crocker. Tizard was the voice of Crocker on the radio for 20 years, and wrote the original Betty Crocker Cookbook in 1950. Tizard was the first host of a radio cooking program in the United States.

== Early life and family ==
Agnes White was born on July 10, 1895, in Illinois. Her parents were George B. White and Laura Ferrell White. She married William E. Tizard, a mining engineer. They lived in Valley Center, California.

== Career ==
Beginning in the early 1920s, Tizard was a home economist for the Washburn Crosby Company, which became General Mills.

In 1924, Tizard became the host of the new radio program, The Betty Crocker Cooking School of the Air, which originally aired on WCCO in Minneapolis and soon was carried nationally on the NBC Radio Network. The show was the first radio cooking program in the United States. Tizard remained in the role for 20 years.

In 1950, White wrote the original Betty Crocker Cookbook.

== Death and legacy ==
Tizard died on March 28, 1979. She is interred at Valley Center Cemetery.

Tizard's Betty Crocker Cookbook is now the flagship book of what has become a large collection of books printed under the Betty Crocker name. More than 75 million copies of the book have been sold since it was first published in 1950.

The home owned by Tizard and her husband is now referred to as the "Betty Crocker House," and is open for tours monthly. The Valley Center Historical Society erected a marker at the site identifying the property as a site of historic interest. The Valley Center History Museum has a permanent exhibit about Tizard's life and work, where visitors can listen to a 1936 recording of Tizard speaking on the Cooking School of the Air radio program.
