= Kiss a Little Longer =

Kiss a Little Longer was an advertising slogan used by the William Wrigley Jr. Corporation to market their gum products in the late 1970s.

== Overview ==
In 1976 Big Red joined the Wm. Wrigley Jr. Company, the largest American manufacturer of chewing gum. The Wrigley family at the time also included Doublemint, Wrigley's Spearmint, Juicy Fruit, and Freedent. Seeing a need in the cinnamon gum market for a full-sized stick, Wrigley launched the campaign in 1979. The advertising campaign's jingle and refrain, "Kiss a Little Longer", became familiar to viewers across the United States in the years afterwards when it was used.

== Target Market ==
Since its creation, Big Red's "Kiss a Little Longer" campaign targeted teens and young adults. This age group consumed half the chewing gum in the United States at the time. Big Red's other major target had been consumers of competitor cinnamon gums, especially Dentyne.

== Marketing Strategy ==
In 1979, three years after Big Red was introduced, the brand's marketing strategy was re-positioned on the concept of 'long lasting fresh breath.' The "Little Longer" campaign was developed to communicate Big Red's product superiority and the benefits it conferred on those who wanted to 'stay close longer.' The marketing situation and conclusions that led to the "Little Longer" campaign began with an awareness that the use and market share of Big Red were declining. At the time, Big Red was only weakly perceived as a cinnamon gum compared to Dentyne, a leader in the national market. The advertising agency BBDO identified two problems that many cinnamon gum chewers faced that Wrigley's could exploit with Big Red. First, the gum did not keep a chewer's breath fresh for a long enough time, and second, many brands of cinnamon gum were too small. Big Red was superior to its competitors in both of these senses, and the marketing statement "No little cinnamon gum freshens breath longer than Big Red" was developed in response and had appeared in many advertisements since then.

This approach was used to show the end benefit of longer lasting fresh breath, primarily the emotional rewards of being closer to others a little longer. The tone was meant to be fun a lively. Lighthearted humor and wholesomeness formed the creative base on which Big Red advertising was created. The popular "Little Longer" campaign showed consumers that many pleasurable situations in which to chew Big Red gum. Throughout its history the advertising slogan was used primarily in television advertising. In 1991 radio spots were introduced, relying on what had become a familiar theme with familiar music. For a brief time, from 1987 to 1990, print ads also appeared.

== Outcome ==
The "Little Longer" campaign drove Big Red market share growth for 15 consecutive years. When Big Red was introduced in 1976 Dentyne was the cinnamon gum leader, but by 1987, backed by the "Little Longer" campaign, Big Red became the number one cinnamon gum and remained so for years. In recent years, Wrigley's and Big Red have moved away from the "Kiss a Little Longer" line, in attempts to focus consumers on a new formula that results in even more longer lasting flavor.
