= Betty Crocker Cookbook =

Cookbook by General Mills

The Betty Crocker Cookbook
- First edition
- Author: General Mills staff Agnes White Tizard
- Original title: Betty Crocker's Picture Cook Book
- Language: English
- Subject: Culinary arts
- Publisher: John Wiley and Sons
- Publication date: 1950 (original), 2016 (12th edition)
- Publication place: United States
- Media type: book
- Pages: 576
- ISBN: 0-7645-8374-3 (10th edition)
- OCLC: 61461077
- Dewey Decimal: 641.5 22
- LC Class: TX714 .C7515 2005

The Betty Crocker Cookbook is a cookbook written by staff at General Mills, the holders of the Betty Crocker trademark. The persona of Betty Crocker was invented by the Washburn-Crosby Company (which would later become General Mills) as a feminine "face" for the company's public relations. Early editions of the cookbook were ostensibly written by the character herself.

More than 75 million copies of the book have been sold since it was first published in 1950. Owing to the dominant color of the book's covers over the years, the Betty Crocker Cookbook is familiarly referred to as "Big Red", a term that General Mills has trademarked.

== History ==
Early media forays for the Betty Crocker character included Betty Crocker Cooking School of the Air broadcast from Minneapolis radio station WCCO beginning in 1924, and several cooking pamphlets such as "Betty Crocker's 101 Delicious Bisquick Creations As Made And Served by Well-Known Gracious Hostesses". The character was so successful that in 1945 Fortune magazine named her the second most popular woman in the United States, after Eleanor Roosevelt. The same article exposed Crocker as "a fake", though to little apparent effect. By the early 1950s, General Mills surveys showed that 99% of American housewives were familiar with the character.

First published on September 8, 1950, with an initial print run of 950,000 copies, as Betty Crocker's Picture Cook Book, the first edition sold for $2.95, with a $3.95 deluxe edition available. The book's launch was heavily promoted by General Mills, with ample time devoted to it on the Betty Crocker's Magazine of the Air radio program and advertisements in magazines such as Ladies' Home Journal, which emphasized that over $100,000 had been spent developing the book's "revolutionary" recipes. The 2,161 recipes for the book were developed by a team of 50 chefs at the General Mills test kitchens, supervised by the home economist Janette Kelley. The book was an immediate best-seller and contemporary reviews were positive; the Chicago Tribune declared it the best general cookbook ever published, and The New York Times noted that its sales of 18,000 copies a week were several times that of the most recent Ernest Hemingway novel.

The original 1950 edition assumed very little knowledge on the part of the reader. The book made extensive use of photography and charts to make its techniques accessible to beginning cooks. It featured an extensive glossary that explained cooking terminology and in addition to recipes it offered instructions for using then-new appliances such as refrigerators and electric ranges. With the Great Depression and food rationing due to the Second World War in the very recent past, the book contains instructions for preparing rabbit, a food that rural Americans resorted to in lean times. In Germany, where food rationing continued for many years after the end of the war, the publication of the cookbook created a popular vision of the United States as a land of inexhaustible resources.

The book's advice extends beyond the kitchen as well: the 1961 edition includes an exhortation to comb one's hair and apply make-up before breakfast each day. Recipes for cake using Betty Crocker-brand cake mixes were a staple of early editions of the book.

The recipes in the first edition are "basic" according to a modern review, and many are "grossly outdated"; there are several recipes for hamloaf and an "international" recipe for "Spaghetti Oriental". A recipe for tuna and Jell-o pie from a 1965 cookbook was featured in a BuzzFeed listicle of "truly upsetting vintage recipes". The 12th edition (subtitled "Everything You Need to Know to Cook From Scratch") was published in October 2016 and features more contemporary cuisine; there are recipes for beef pho, ropa vieja, and shakshouka. An entire chapter is devoted to vegetarian cuisine.

The Betty Crocker Cookbook is now the flagship book of what has become a large collection of books printed under the Betty Crocker name.

== Editions ==
The Betty Crocker Cookbook is available in binder, trade paperback, and comb-bound formats, as well as several special-interest formats such as bridal, heart health, and a breast cancer fundraising edition. Mobile apps for iOS and Android are available to access the Betty Crocker recipe database on the web.

The Betty Crocker cookbook series includes more than 250 different books published since 1950 on subjects such as cooking basics, entertaining, as well as Betty Crocker: Kids Cook, first published in 1957 as Betty Crocker’s Cook Book for Boys and Girls. In 1980, following broadening American tastes, Betty Crocker cookbooks based around international cuisine started to appear, such as the bilingual English/Spanish Cocina Betty Crocker (a Mexican food guide), Betty Crocker's Chinese Cookbook, Betty Crocker's Indian Home Cooking, and others. The current range of cookbooks features over twenty different books.

The original 1950 edition and the Betty Crocker Cooky Book have been reprinted as facsimiles.

== Social perspectives ==
It is commonly asserted that the primary purpose of the Betty Crocker Cookbook is to sell pre-packaged Betty Crocker-brand ingredients, which are specified in the book's recipes. The culinary historian Laura Shapiro does not dispute this, but suggests that the relative ease of making a partially pre-packaged cake recipe from the cookbook empowered women to experiment and to view cooking as a creative outlet, which in turn helped housewives of the 1950s begin to see homemaking as a respectable profession unto itself.

== See also ==
- Betty Crocker
- Betty Crocker Kitchens
- The Joy of Cooking, a near-contemporary popular cookbook
