= Test kitchen =

New food development kitchen

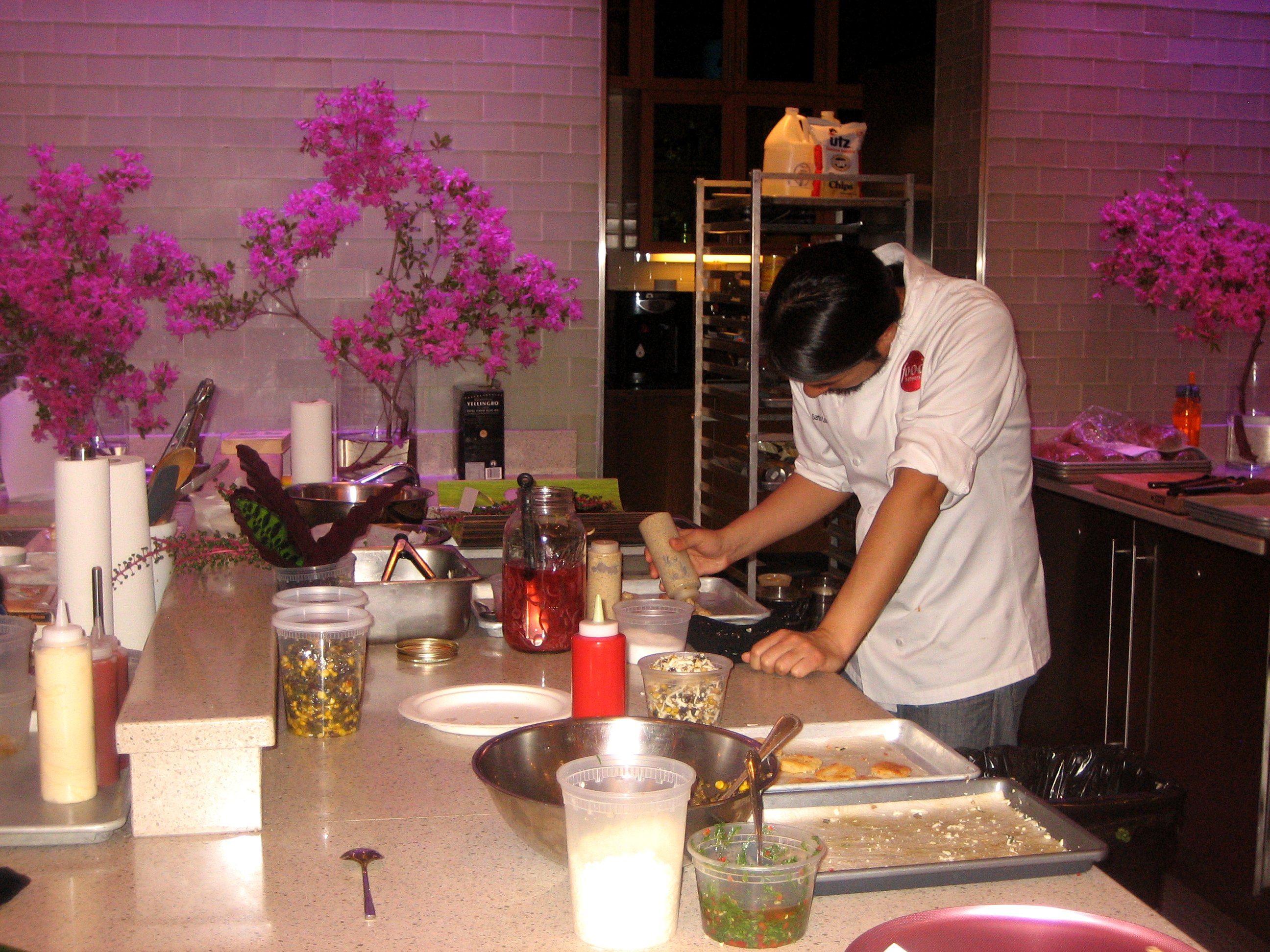
Food Network's test kitchen

A test kitchen is a kitchen used for the process of developing new kinds of food. On the largest scale, they are run by the research and development departments of large companies in the food industry. Other test kitchens are owned by individuals who enjoy the craft of developing new recipes.

== Popular culture ==
The name has been given to a popular American television show called America's Test Kitchen.

== See also ==
- Betty Crocker Kitchens
