= Adelaide Hawley Cumming =

Vaudeville performer, radio host, teacher (1905–1998)

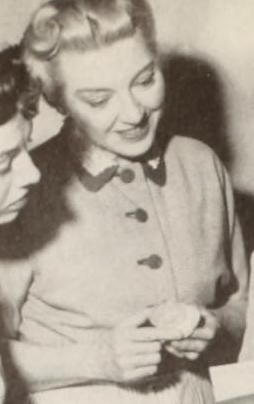
- Born: Dieta Adelaide Fish; March 6, 1905; Scranton, Pennsylvania, U.S.
- Died: December 21, 1998 (aged 93); Bremerton, Washington, U.S.
- Education: University of Montevallo
- Occupations: Vaudevillian; radio host; actress; company mascot; teacher
- Known for: Portrayal and trademark of mascot character "Betty Crocker" for General Mills

Adelaide Hawley Cumming (born Dieta Adelaide Fish; March 6, 1905 – December 21, 1998) was an American broadcaster whose career spanned three decades. Born in Scranton, Pennsylvania, she was educated in New York, where she studied music at the University of Rochester, intending to work in opera. She became a music teacher instead, teaching in Alabama, and later a singer on the vaudeville circuit. In 1935, she began her long career in radio and later television, becoming widely known for shows like "The Woman Reporter", "Woman's Page of the Air", and "News of the Day" on NBC and CBS. From 1950 to 1964, she appeared in her final role as "Betty Crocker" for General Mills, making her one of the most recognizable women in America at the time. After her career in broadcasting and entertainment, she went back to school and earned her PhD in speech education in 1967 at 62 years old, teaching English as a second language until her death at the age of 93.

== Early life and education ==
Dieta Adelaide Fish was born in Scranton, Pennsylvania, and grew up in Willet, New York. She studied piano and voice on a scholarship at Eastman School of Music at the University of Rochester and graduated with a Bachelor's degree in Music in 1926. She taught as assistant professor of voice at the Alabama College, State College for Women School of Music in Montevallo, Alabama, for two and a half years. Her career as an entertainer began when she collaborated with two of her friends to form a vaudeville trio named "Red, Black and Gold", in which their hair was artificially colored to match the sobriquet.

Widespread exposure came in the form of the Adelaide Hawley Program which she hosted From 1937 to 1950, first on NBC Radio, subsequently on CBS Radio. A daily news and talk radio show, it was broadcast nationwide, attracting an estimated 3 million listeners. She also hosted the TV show Fashions on Parade on DuMont from 1948 to 1949, and on ABC in 1949.

== Betty Crocker and General Mills ==
From 1949 to 1964, she played "Betty Crocker", as a living trademark for General Mills. Although she "had little experience of any kind with cooking," her experience in broadcasting was a key in her replacing the previous woman who portrayed Crocker. Billed as America's First Lady of Food., she became the most recognizable woman in America, second only to Eleanor Roosevelt. With Cumming in the title role, the 30-minute Betty Crocker Show appeared on CBS from 1950 to 1952. She then took the role for ABC in two shows, Betty Crocker Star Matinee and Bride and Groom. As Crocker she appeared in the George Burns and Gracie Allen comedy series, which would segue into commercial with phrases such as "I don't know how to bake a cake, Gracie, but here is Betty Crocker to show us how." General Mills, looking for updated branding, dropped Cumming in 1964.

== Later life ==
After being dropped by General Mills, Cumming resumed her educational career, entering New York University and acquiring a doctoral degree in speech education in 1967.

Cumming was married twice. Her initial marriage was to Mark Hawley, an announcer best remembered as the voice of Pathé Newsreels. The Hawleys were charter members of the American Federation of Radio Artists, now the American Federation of Television and Radio Artists. Her second marriage was to Naval Air Cmdr. Laurence Gordon Cumming, with whom she relocated to the Pacific Northwest. There she taught English as a second language, and she maintained this role until December 18, 1998, giving her final class three days before her death. She died on December 21, 1998, at Harrison Hospital, Bremerton, Washington, aged 93.
