= Big Red (gum) =

Brand of chewing gum

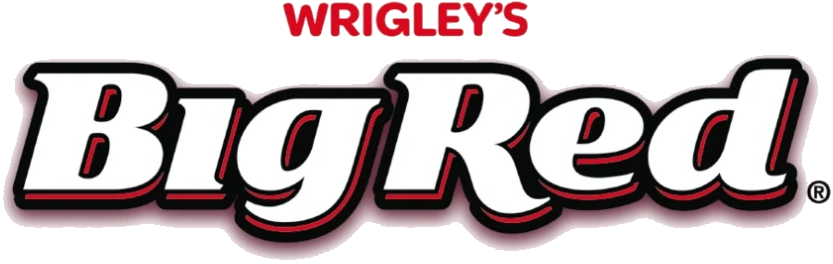

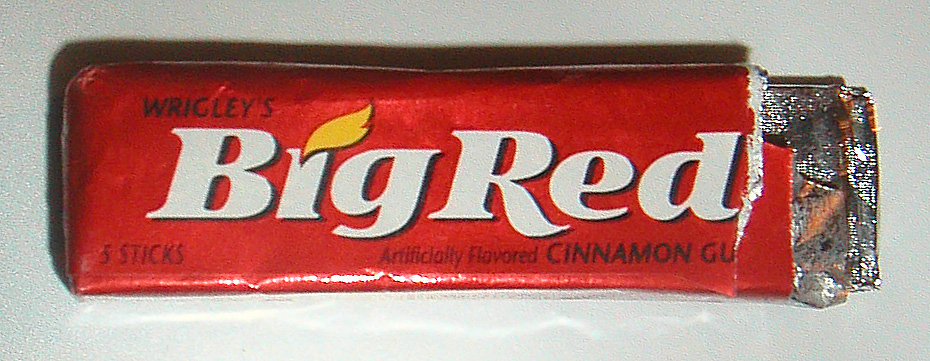
- Product type: Chewing gum
- Current owner: Mars, Inc.
- Produced by: Wrigley Company
- Country: United States
- Introduced: 1975; 51 years ago
- Tagline: "Long lasting fresh breath"
- Website: mars.com/big-red-cinnamon

Big Red is a cinnamon flavored chewing gum introduced by the William Wrigley Jr. Company in 1975. Big Red was available in the United Kingdom and Ireland in the latter part of the 1990s, but was withdrawn from these markets at the end of the decade. It is a popular souvenir for visitors to the United States from Ireland or the United Kingdom.

Big Red was also released in Australia in the early to mid-1980s, but was discontinued there at the end of the decade. It was re-released in 2004, and again at the end of 2007.

It is also available in Mexico, Luxembourg, Belgium, Latvia, Norway, Poland, Slovenia, New Zealand, and parts of Sweden; the gum sold in Germany, Norway and Poland is not red but white. It is meant to be hot in flavor. Despite it not being a sugarless gum, in 2003 in the United States, Wrigley's replaced some of the sugar with aspartame and Ace K, both artificial sweeteners. Sugar-free variants are exported from Poland to other countries, including the United Kingdom.

== The "Big Red" song ==
Like its sister product, Juicy Fruit, Big Red had its own commercial jingle, called Kiss a Little Longer, which was used from 1979 to 1998. The song was composed by Peter Cofield from Sunday Productions in New York City, and sung by Ryan Devereaux. Many of the commercials depicted couples passionately kissing in a romantic setting for an unusually long time, always including one kisser who then must chase his departing ride.

This commercial formula would later be parodied by a number of television shows, including Saturday Night Live. In August 2008, Wrigley teamed up with popular singer songwriter Ne-Yo to update the classic jingle. In February 2010, Verizon Wireless repurposed the classic jingle for a television campaign featuring the company's industry nickname, "Big Red" (a reference to the colour of the company's logo).

== In popular culture ==
Big Red was referenced in the 2006 movie Talladega Nights: The Ballad of Ricky Bobby in a mid-credits sequence where Ricky Bobby (played by Will Ferrell) utters the phrase "I'm Ricky Bobby. If you don't chew Big Red, then fuck you."

Big Red also features in the second episode of the Marvel Studios streaming series, WandaVision. In the episode taking place in the 1960s, Vision is given a piece of Big Red chewing gum. However, Big Red was not introduced until 1975.

Big Red is a plot point in the final episode of Poker Face season 2.

Big Red is used as an adhesive for a makeshift tool in The Running Man (2025).

== Sponsorship ==
Along with Wrigley's gum products, Big Red were sponsors of former NASCAR team Chip Ganassi Racing. Big Red also sponsored Juan Pablo Montoya's 42 car from 2007 to 2008.
