= Sponsor (magazine) =

- First issue, November 1946
- First issue: November 1946
- Final issue: May 1968
- OCLC: 1589472

Sponsor was created by Norman R. Glenn for radio and TV advertising sponsors. The first issue of the magazine was published in November 1946 as a monthly, before being published twice a month from January 1949. It became a weekly in 1956 and the last issue was published in May 1968.

== History ==
=== Founding ===
Norman R. Glenn is the creator, publisher, and founding editor of Sponsor. Glenn was born in Chicago Heights, Illinois, on September 3, 1909. Glenn left college his senior year at the University of Chicago because of financial issues. Glenn took a job with the Chicago Daily News. There, Glenn was introduced to the general manager at WLS radio where he initially started working as a placard holder for WLS's weekly show, The National Barn Dance. While at WLS he would be promoted to information clerk and eventually promoted to promotion director in 1933. In 1945, Glenn married Elaine Cooper. Glenn then worked as executive director of Frequency Modulation Magazine.

While at Broadcasting magazine, Glenn envisioned a trade journal aimed towards the service and concerns of broadcast media, broadcasters, and advertisers. With this vision came the first publication of Sponsor magazine in November 1946. In the credo section of Sponsor's first issue, president and publisher Glenn stated five reasons of objectivity for his magazine. One, "to give the sponsor what he needs to understand and effectively use broadcast advertising in all its forms." Two, "to sort out the four broadcast advertising mediums -AM, FM, TV, FAX -in their present -day perspective." Three, "to make every line of editorial content vital and vivid to the sponsor." Four, "to look at broadcast advertising issues fairly, firmly, and constructively." Finally, "to promote good broadcast advertising - advertising that is good for the sponsor and good for the listener."

The first issue of Sponsor featured an offer for a five dollar yearly subscription on its cover. Their offices were located at 40 West 52 Street, New York, New York.

=== Content ===
Sponsor magazine was a popular, successful, and influential magazine among the broadcasting community. Sponsor editorials exercised focus on sound TV and radio practices, creation of a television ad bureau, a revitalized radio ad bureau, improved research, and media buying professionalism. While in production Sponsor would occasionally run series not directly connected to broadcasting or advertising. One of the first series was titled, "This We Fight For". This series of articles dealt with ethical standards in America during the time of the 1950s. Sponsor also ran a series titled, "Red Channels" in the early to mid 1950s. The Red Channels' series focused on McCarthyism. From this series, Sponsor was able to win the George Polk Awards for distinguished journalism.

=== Frequency ===
Sponsor was a monthly magazine for its first four years and became a bimonthly magazine starting in January 1949. It became a weekly on October 27, 1956.

=== Sale ===
Glenn sold Sponsor to Ojibway Press of Duluth, Minnesota, in 1963, and, after 18 years and over 500 issues, his last issue as publisher was the December 28, 1964, issue.

=== Closure ===
Harcourt, Brace & World acquired Ojibway Press in April 1968 and, after being in circulation for 22 years, Sponsor ceased publication in May 1968 citing falling advertising revenues.
