= List of songs recorded by Victorious cast =

Songs recorded by Victorious cast

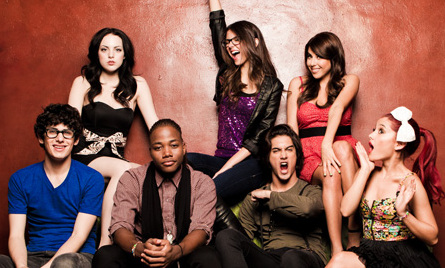
The Victorious cast in 2011

The cast of Victorious, an American musical group formed for the Nickelodeon television series that aired from 2010 to 2013, recorded songs for use in the program. These were primarily performed by the show's lead actress, Victoria Justice, along with co-stars Ariana Grande, Elizabeth Gillies, Leon Thomas III, and Matt Bennett. The cast made their musical debut in 2010 with the single "Make It Shine", the show's theme song, performed by Justice. Following the success of the series, one soundtrack album, Victorious: Music from the Hit TV Show (2011), and two extended plays, Victorious 2.0: More Music from the Hit TV Show (2012) and Victorious 3.0: Even More Music from the Hit TV Show (2012), were released through Nickelodeon Records and Columbia Records. Several songs were featured within episodes of the series, while other tracks appeared as promotional singles.

== Songs ==
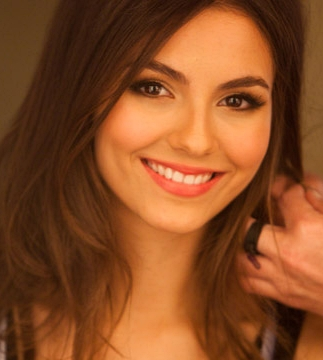
Victoria Justice was featured on most of the show's songs.

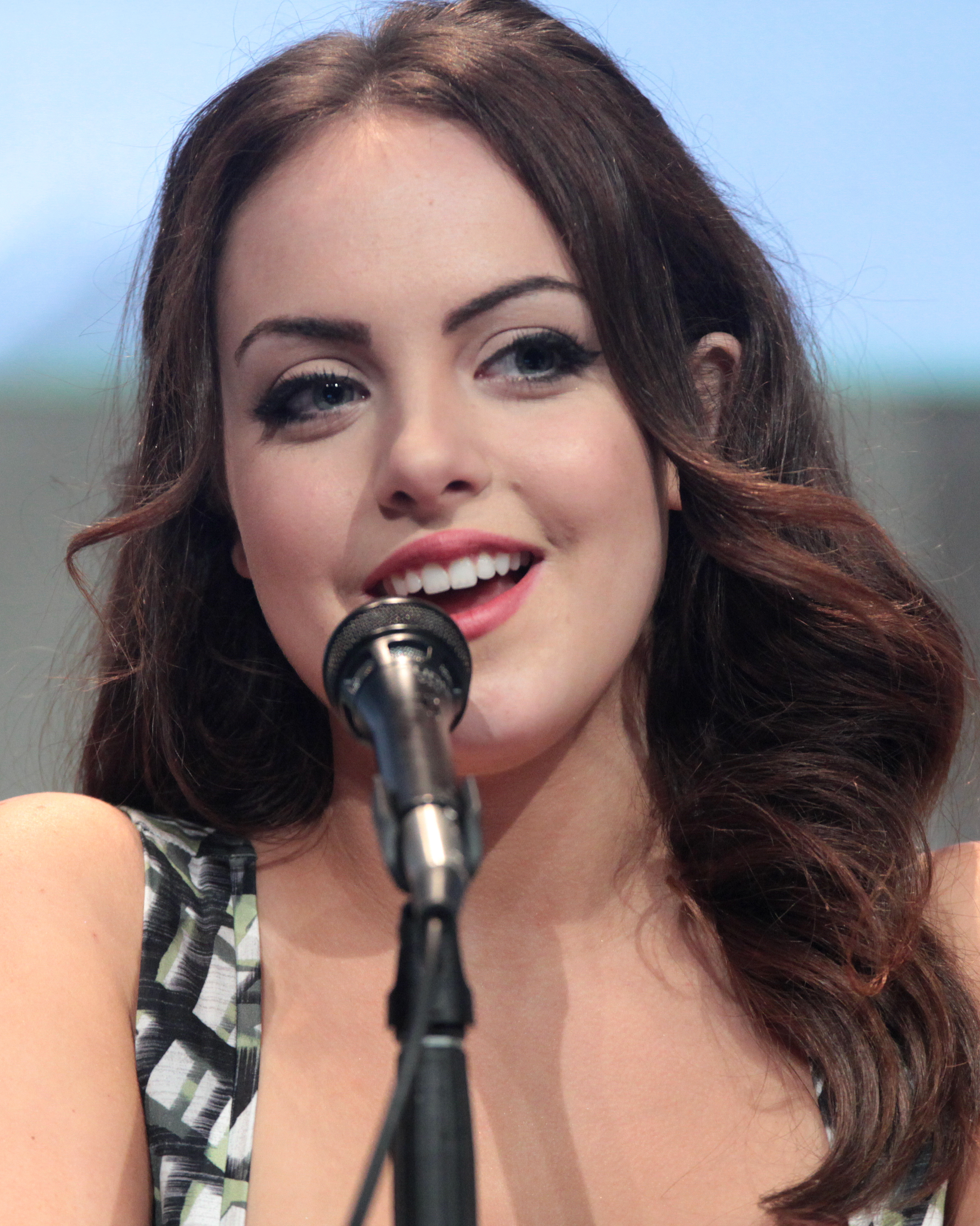
Elizabeth Gillies was featured on "Give It Up", "Take a Hint", and "You Don't Know Me".

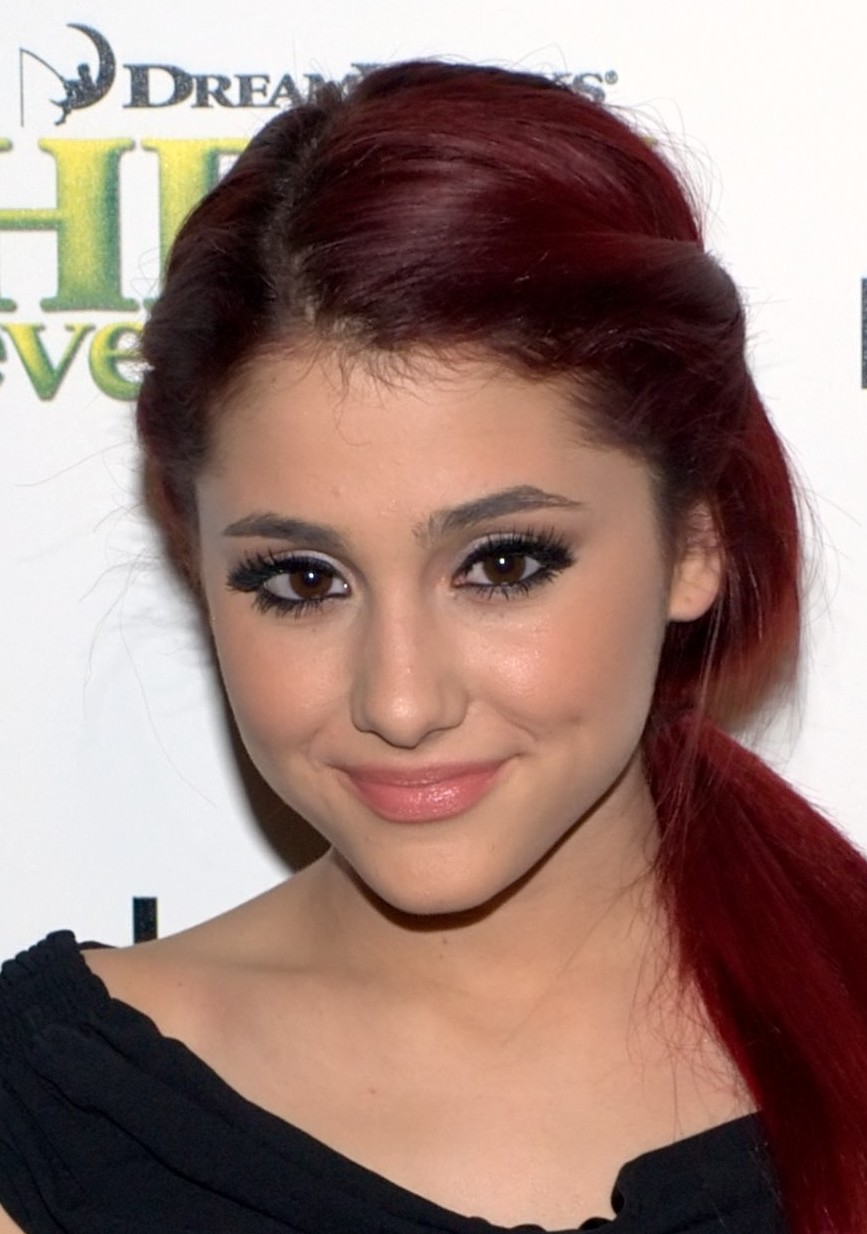
Ariana Grande was featured on "Give It Up" and "L.A. Boyz".

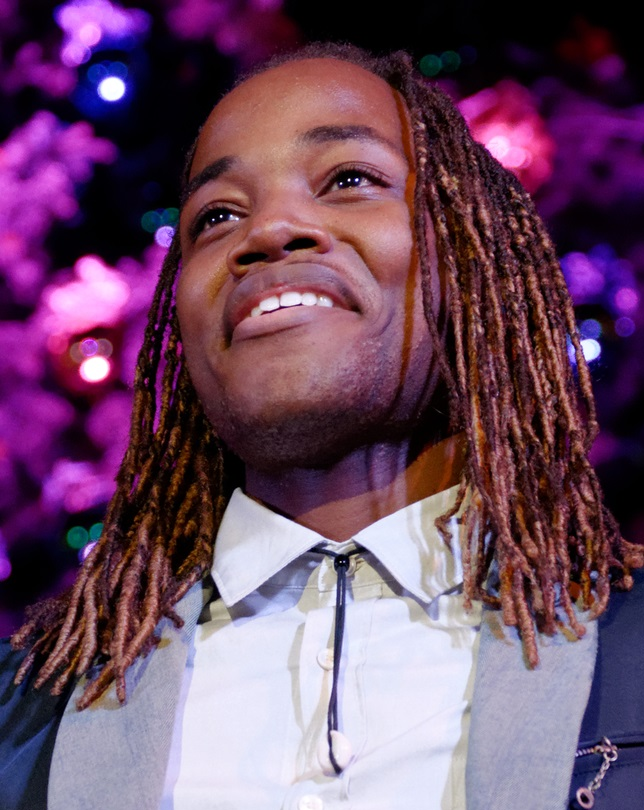
Leon Thomas III was featured on the tracks "Song 2 You", "Tell Me That You Love Me", "Countdown", and "365 days".

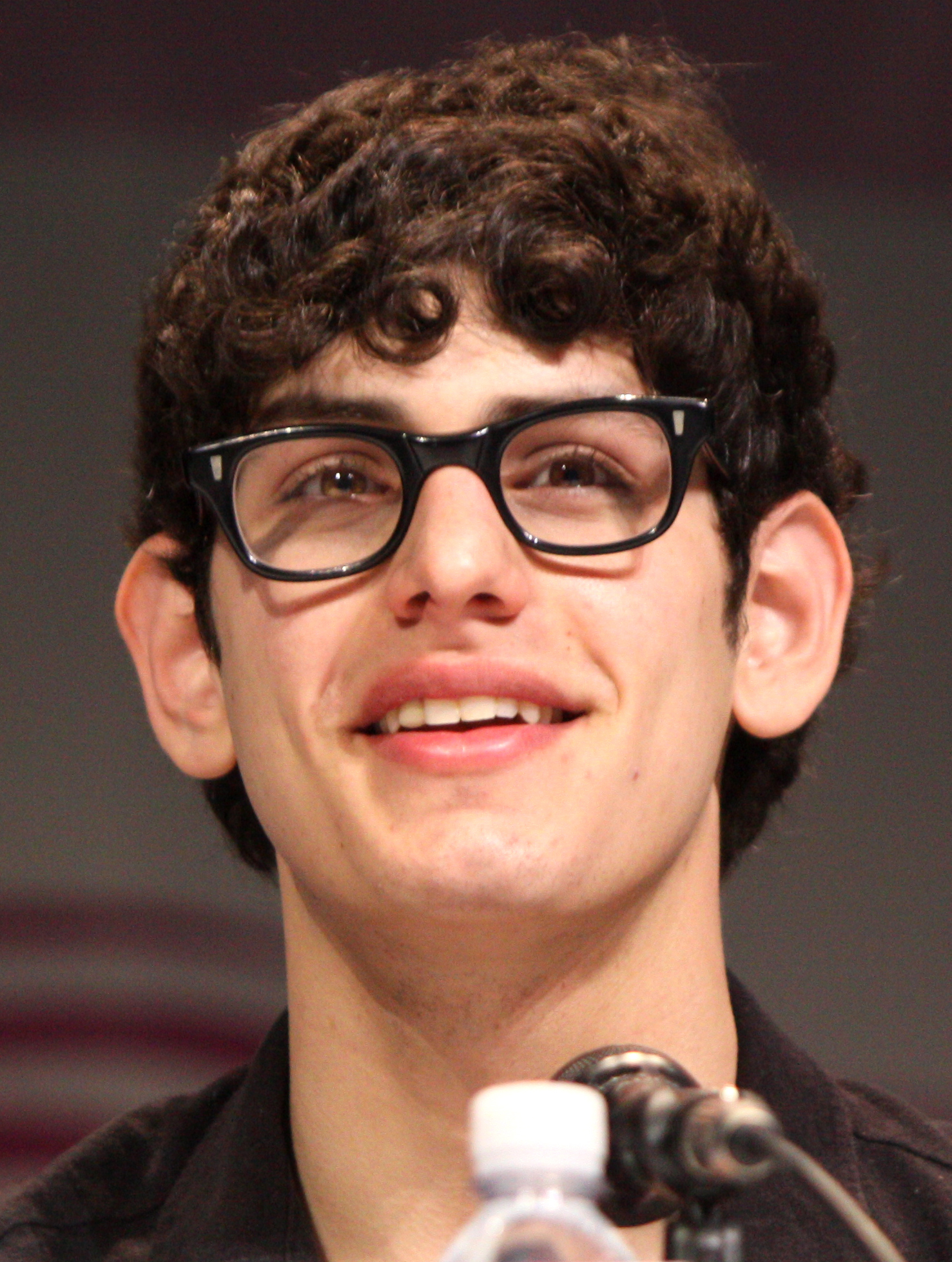
Matt Bennett was featured on "Broken Glass" and "I Think You're Swell".

Name of song, featured performers, writers, originating album, and year released
Song	Writer(s)	Album/EP/Single(s)	Year	Ref.
"5 Fingaz to the Face" (featuring Victoria Justice)	Michael Corcoran; Dan Schneider; Eric Goldman	Victorious 2.0: More Music from the Hit TV Show	2012	
"365 Days" (featuring Leon Thomas III)	Allan Grigg; Lindy Robbins; Leon Thomas III	Victorious 3.0: Even More Music from the Hit TV Show (Walmart ZinePak edition)	2012	
"All I Want Is Everything" (featuring Victoria Justice)	Lindy Robbins; Toby Gad	Victorious: Music from the Hit TV Show	2011	
"Bad Boys" (featuring Victoria Justice)	Jordan Reynolds; Kara DioGuardi; Chris DeStefano	Victorious 3.0: Even More Music from the Hit TV Show	2012	
"Beggin' on Your Knees" (featuring Victoria Justice)	Shellback; Savan Kotecha	Victorious: Music from the Hit TV Show	2011	
"Best Friend's Brother" (featuring Victoria Justice)	Savan Kotecha; Allan Grigg	Victorious: Music from the Hit TV Show	2011	
"Broken Glass" (featuring Matt Bennett)	Dan Schneider	Victorious: Music from the Hit TV Show (iTunes edition)	2011	
"Cheer Me Up" (featuring Victoria Justice)	Toby Gad; Natasha Bedingfield	Victorious 3.0: Even More Music from the Hit TV Show (Walmart ZinePak edition)	2012	
"Countdown" (featuring Victoria Justice and Leon Thomas III)	Kool Kojak; Leon Thomas III; Travis Garland	Victorious 2.0: More Music from the Hit TV Show	2012	
"Don't You (Forget About Me)" (featuring Victoria Justice)	Keith Forsey; Steve Schiff	Victorious 2.0: More Music from the Hit TV Show	2012	
"Faster Than Boyz" (featuring Victoria Justice)	Allan Grigg; Victoria Justice	Victorious 3.0: Even More Music from the Hit TV Show	2012	
"Finally Falling" (featuring Victoria Justice)	Michael Corcoran; CJ Abraham; Zack Hexum; Dan Schneider; Drake Bell	Victorious: Music from the Hit TV Show	2011	
"Freak the Freak Out" (featuring Victoria Justice)	Michael Corcoran; CJ Abraham; Zack Hexum; Dan Schneider; Nick Hexum	Victorious: Music from the Hit TV Show	2010	
"Give It Up" (featuring Elizabeth Gillies and Ariana Grande)	Michael Corcoran; CJ Abraham; Dan Schneider	Victorious: Music from the Hit TV Show	2011	
"Here's 2 Us" (featuring Victoria Justice)	Lindy Robbins; Evan Bogart; Emanuel Kiriakou; Michelle Branch	Victorious 3.0: Even More Music from the Hit TV Show	2012	
"I Think You're Swell" (featuring Matt Bennett)	Matt Bennett	Victorious 2.0: More Music from the Hit TV Show (iTunes edition)	2012	
"I Want You Back" (featuring Victoria Justice)	The Corporation	Victorious: Music from the Hit TV Show	2011	
"It's Not Christmas Without You" (featuring Victoria Justice)	Dan Schneider; Eric Goldman; Michael Corcoran	Merry Nickmas	2011	
"L.A. Boyz" (featuring Victoria Justice and Ariana Grande)	Kool Kojak; Michael Corcoran; Dan Schneider; Lindy Robbins	Victorious 3.0: Even More Music from the Hit TV Show	2012	
"Leave It All to Shine" (iCarly and Victorious casts featuring Miranda Cosgrove and Victoria Justice)	Łukasz Gottwald; Michael Corcoran; Dan Schneider	Victorious: Music from the Hit TV Show	2011	
"Make It in America" (featuring Victoria Justice)	Victoria Justice; Martin Johnson	Victorious 3.0: Even More Music from the Hit TV Show	2012	
"Make It Shine" (featuring Victoria Justice)	Łukasz Gottwald; Michael Corcoran; Dan Schneider	Victorious: Music from the Hit TV Show	2010	
"Shut Up and Dance" (featuring Victoria Justice)	Michael Corcoran; Eric Goldman; Lindy Robbins; Dan Schneider	Victorious 2.0: More Music from the Hit TV Show	2012	
"Song 2 You" (featuring Leon Thomas III and Victoria Justice)	Leon Thomas III; Brian Kierulf; Josh Schwartz	Victorious: Music from the Hit TV Show	2011	
"Take a Hint" (featuring Victoria Justice and Elizabeth Gillies)	Meghan Kabir; Kevin Kadish; James Michael	Victorious 2.0: More Music from the Hit TV Show	2012	
"Tell Me That You Love Me" (featuring Victoria Justice and Leon Thomas III)	Michael Corcoran; CJ Abraham; Zack Hexum; Dan Schneider	Victorious: Music from the Hit TV Show	2011	
"You Don't Know Me" (featuring Elizabeth Gillies)	Elizabeth Gillies; Jason Levine; Sam Bisbee	Victorious 3.0: Even More Music from the Hit TV Show	2012	
"You're the Reason" (featuring Victoria Justice)	Michael Corcoran; CJ Abraham; Dan Schneider	Victorious: Music from the Hit TV Show	2011	

== See also ==
- Victorious discography
