= Victorious discography =

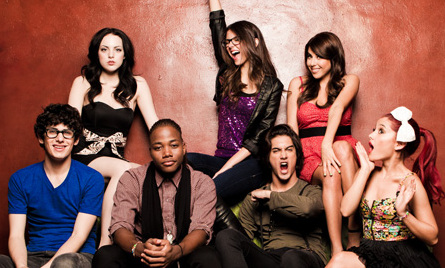
- The Victorious cast in 2011
- EPs: 2
- Soundtrack albums: 1
- Singles: 10
- Music videos: 10
- Promotional singles: 1

Victorious is an American television show that aired on Nickelodeon from March 27, 2010, to February 2, 2013, and ran for four seasons. It focuses on aspiring singer Tori Vega (Victoria Justice), a teenager who attends a performing arts high school named Hollywood Arts High School. The discography of the Victorious cast consists of one soundtrack album, two extended plays, ten singles, one promotional single, and ten music videos. The show's debut soundtrack album Victorious: Music from the Hit TV Show peaked at number five on the US Billboard 200, with the singles "Freak the Freak Out", "Beggin' on Your Knees", and "Best Friend's Brother" all charting on the US Billboard Hot 100. Victorious 2.0: More Music from the Hit TV Show, the show's debut extended play, was released in June 2012 and peaked at number 18 on the Billboard 200. It spawned the single "Take a Hint", which peaked at number eight on the US Billboard Bubbling Under Hot 100. The show's second and final extended play Victorious 3.0: Even More Music from the Hit TV Show was released in November 2012. It debuted and peaked at number 159 on the Billboard 200.

== Soundtrack albums ==
List of soundtrack albums, with selected chart positions
Title	Soundtrack album details	Peak chart positions										Sales	Certifications
Title	Soundtrack album details	US	US Kid	US Sound.	AUT	GER	SPA	SWI	UK Down.	UK Comp.	UK Sound.	Sales	Certifications
Victorious: Music from the Hit TV Show (featuring Victoria Justice)	Released: August 2, 2011; Formats: CD, digital download, streaming; Labels: Nickelodeon, Columbia	5	1	1	35	100	36	69	66	10	13	US: 41,000 (Note: Sales of Victorious: Music from the Hit TV Show in the United States as of August 10, 2011)	BPI: Gold

== Extended plays ==
List of extended plays, with selected chart positions
Title	Extended play details	Peak chart positions					Sales
Title	Extended play details	US	US Kid	US Sound.	UK Comp.	UK Sound.	Sales
Victorious 2.0: More Music from the Hit TV Show (featuring Victoria Justice)	Released: June 5, 2012; Formats: CD, digital download, streaming.; Labels: Nickelodeon, Columbia	18	1	2	44	16	US: 70,000 (Note: Sales of Victorious 2.0: More Music from the Hit TV Show in the United States as of December 22, 2012)
Victorious 3.0: Even More Music from the Hit TV Show (featuring Victoria Justice)	Released: November 6, 2012; Formats: CD, digital download, streaming; Labels: Nickelodeon, Columbia	159	6	10	—	—	US: 3,000 (Note: Sales of Victorious 3.0: Even More Music from the Hit TV Show in the United States as of November 24, 2012)
"—" denotes items which did not chart in that country.

== Singles ==
List of singles with selected chart positions, showing year released and album name
Title	Year	Peak chart positions								Certifications	Album
Title	Year	US	US Dig.	US Heat.	US Hol. Dig.	US Kid Dig.	US Pop Dig.	AUS Hit.	UK	Certifications	Album
"Make It Shine" (featuring Victoria Justice)	2010	— (Note: "Make It Shine" did not enter the Billboard Hot 100, but peaked at number 16 on the Bubbling Under Hot 100 chart.)	—	17	—	6	39	—	—		Victorious: Music from the Hit TV Show
"Freak the Freak Out" (featuring Victoria Justice)	2010	50	41	1	—	6	21	7	176	RIAA: Gold	Victorious: Music from the Hit TV Show
"Beggin' on Your Knees" (featuring Victoria Justice)	2011	58	35	—	—	1	19	—	—	BPI: Silver	Victorious: Music from the Hit TV Show
"Best Friend's Brother" (featuring Victoria Justice)	2011	86	65	—	—	1	27	—	—		Victorious: Music from the Hit TV Show
"Leave It All to Shine" (iCarly and Victorious casts featuring Miranda Cosgrove and Victoria Justice)	2011	— (Note: "Leave It All to Shine" did not enter the Billboard Hot 100, but peaked at number 24 on the Bubbling Under Hot 100 chart.)	—	—	—	2	—	—	—		Victorious: Music from the Hit TV Show
"It's Not Christmas Without You" (featuring Victoria Justice)	2011	—	—	—	23	5	—	—	—		Merry Nickmas
"You're the Reason" (Note: Sources stating that "You're the Reason" is a single: Complex, Teen Vogue, and Twist) (featuring Victoria Justice)	2011	— (Note: "You're the Reason" did not enter the Billboard Hot 100, but peaked at number 24 on the Bubbling Under Hot 100 chart.)	—	—	—	1	—	—	—		Victorious: Music from the Hit TV Show
"Countdown" (featuring Leon Thomas III and Victoria Justice)	2012	—	—	—	—	10	—	—	—		Victorious 2.0: More Music from the Hit TV Show
"Take a Hint" (featuring Victoria Justice and Elizabeth Gillies)	2012	— (Note: "Take a Hint" did not enter the Billboard Hot 100, but peaked at number eight on the Bubbling Under Hot 100.)	60	—	—	1	27	—	—	RIAA: Platinum; BPI: Silver	Victorious 2.0: More Music from the Hit TV Show
"Make It in America" (featuring Victoria Justice)	2012	—	—	—	—	1	—	—	—		Victorious 2.0: More Music from the Hit TV Show
"—" denotes items which did not chart in that country.

=== Promotional singles ===
List of promotional singles, with selected chart positions, showing year released and album name
Title	Year	US Kid Dig.	Album
"L.A. Boyz" (Note: Sources stating that "L.A. Boyz" is a promotional single: Bop and Tiger Beat, M Magazine, and RyanSeacrest.com) (featuring Victoria Justice and Ariana Grande)	2012	6	Victorious 2.0: More Music from the Hit TV Show

== Other charted songs ==
List of other charted songs, with selected chart positions, showing year released and album name
Title	Year	Peak chart positions			Album
Title	Year	US Bub.	US Kid Dig.	US Pop Dig.	Album
"All I Want Is Everything" (featuring Victoria Justice)	2011	—	2	—	Victorious: Music from the Hit TV Show
"Give It Up" (featuring Elizabeth Gillies and Ariana Grande)	2011	23	3	—	Victorious: Music from the Hit TV Show
"I Want You Back" (featuring Victoria Justice)	2011	8	1	38	Victorious: Music from the Hit TV Show
"Song 2 You" (featuring Leon Thomas III and Victoria Justice)	2011	—	8	—	Victorious: Music from the Hit TV Show
"Tell Me That You Love Me" (featuring Victoria Justice and Leon Thomas III)	2011	—	11	—	Victorious: Music from the Hit TV Show
"Finally Falling" (featuring Victoria Justice)	2011	—	10	—	Victorious: Music from the Hit TV Show
"Shut Up and Dance" (featuring Victoria Justice)	2012	—	10	—	Victorious 2.0: More Music from the Hit TV Show
"5 Fingaz to the Face" (featuring Victoria Justice)	2012	—	8	—	Victorious 2.0: More Music from the Hit TV Show
"Here's 2 Us" (featuring Victoria Justice)	2012	—	8	—	Victorious 3.0: Even More Music from the Hit TV Show
"You Don't Know Me" (featuring Elizabeth Gillies)	2012	—	16	—	Victorious 3.0: Even More Music from the Hit TV Show
"Faster Than Boyz" (featuring Victoria Justice)	2012	—	8	—	Victorious 3.0: Even More Music from the Hit TV Show
"—" denotes items which did not chart.

== Music videos ==
Title	Year	Ref.
"Freak the Freak Out"	2010	
"Beggin' on Your Knees"	2011	
"Best Friend's Brother"	2011	
"I Want You Back"	2011	
"All I Want Is Everything"	2011	
"All I Want Is Everything" (flash mob video)	2011	
"You're the Reason" (acoustic version)	2011	
"Make It in America"	2012	
"L.A. Boyz"	2012	
"Here's 2 Us"	2012	
