= Elizabeth Gillies discography =

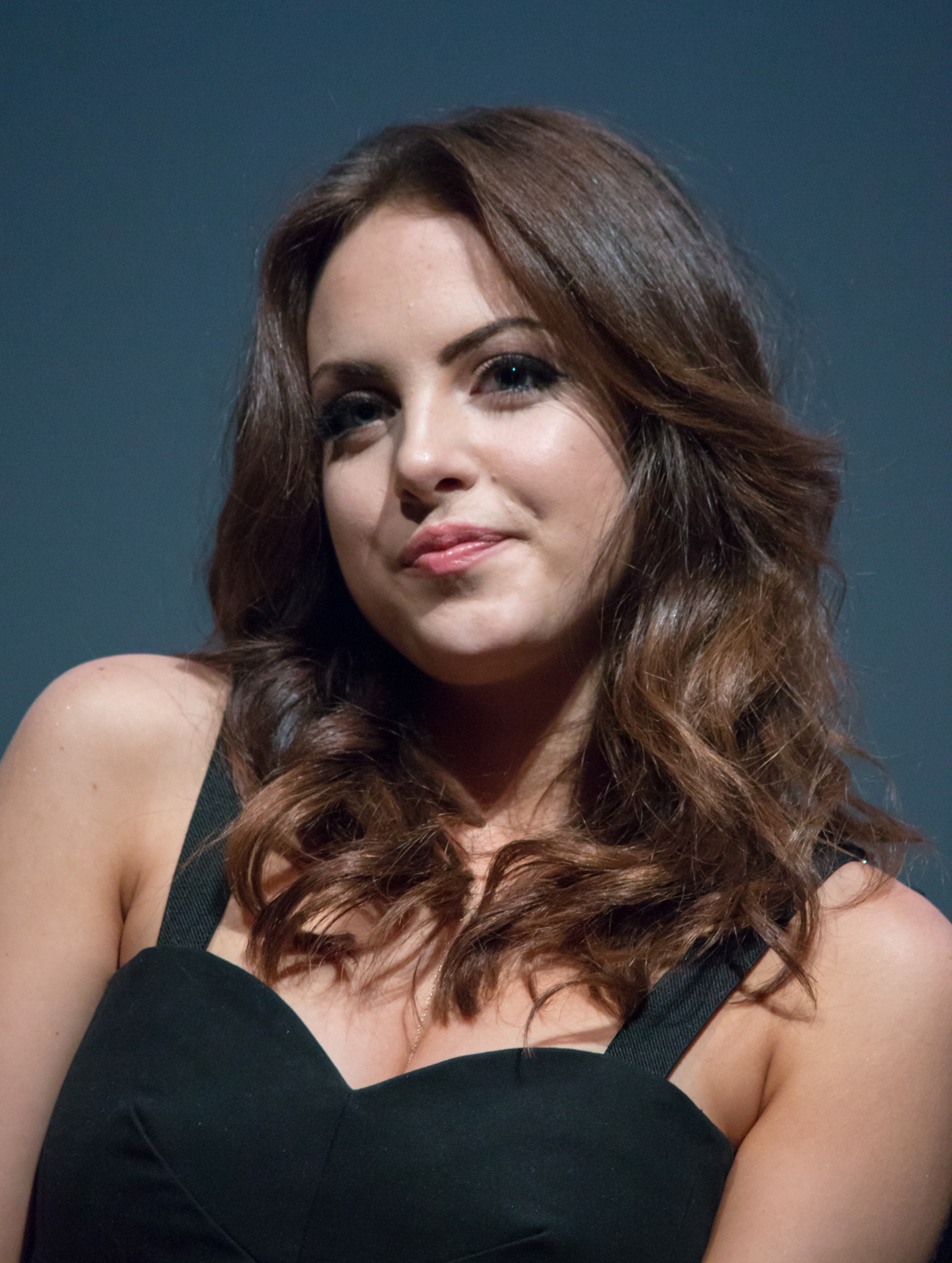
- Gillies in June 2015
- Studio albums: 1
- EPs: 1
- Singles: 3
- Music videos: 3
- Promotional singles: 28

The discography of the American actress and singer Elizabeth Gillies consists of one studio album, one extended play, three singles, twenty-eight promotional singles, and three music videos.

Gillies made her theatrical debut in 2008 when she was cast in the Broadway musical 13 alongside Ariana Grande, with whom she would later co-star in the TV series Victorious. Subsequently, Gillies was featured in several songs on the soundtracks Victorious, Victorious 2.0, and Victorious 3.0. After Victorious ended in 2013, she was also signed to the Columbia Records label, but after the deal with Columbia ended, she only released songs in conjunction with her acting roles. These have included roles on the TV series Sex & Drugs & Rock & Roll (for which she performed several original songs) and Dynasty. Gillies co-produced some of these songs with her boyfriend and later husband, the composer and musician Michael Corcoran.

During the COVID-19 pandemic, Gillies and the comedian and performer Seth MacFarlane collaborated on eight songs for their extended playlist Songs from Home, released in 2021. Gillies and MacFarlane released their Christmas album, We Wish You the Merriest, in 2023.

== Studio albums ==
List of studio albums, with selected details
Title	Studio album details	Peak chart positions	
Title	Studio album details	US Holiday	US Jazz
We Wish You the Merriest (with Seth MacFarlane)	Released: November 3, 2023; Label: Republic, Verve, Fuzzy Door; Format: CD, digital download, LP, streaming	47	20

== Extended plays ==
List of extended plays, with selected details
Title	Extended play details
Songs from Home (with Seth MacFarlane)	Released: August 20, 2021; Label: Republic, Verve, Fuzzy Door; Format: Digital download, streaming

== Singles ==
List of singles, with selected chart positions, showing year released and album name
Title	Year	Peak chart positions										Certifications	Album
Title	Year	US Holiday	AUS	CZ Dig.	GRE Dig. Inter.	HUN	NLD	POR	SWE Heat.	SWI	UK	Certifications	Album
"Santa Baby" (Ariana Grande featuring Elizabeth Gillies) (Note: Credited as Liz Gillies)	2013	36	77	76	90	29	53	77	15	77	155	ARIA: Gold; BPI: Silver	Christmas Kisses
"We Wish You the Merriest" (with Seth MacFarlane)	2023	—	—	—	—	—	—	—	—	—	—		We Wish You the Merriest
"Sleigh Ride" (with Seth MacFarlane)	2023	—	—	—	—	—	—	—	—	—	—		We Wish You the Merriest
"—" denotes items which did not chart in that country.

=== Promotional singles ===
List of promotional singles, with selected chart positions, showing year released and album name
Title	Year	Peak chart positions				Certifications	Album
Title	Year	US Bub.	US Dig.	US Kid	US Pop Dig.	Certifications	Album
"Take a Hint" (Victorious cast featuring Victoria Justice and Elizabeth Gillies)	2012	8	60	1	27	RIAA: Platinum; BPI: Silver	Victorious 2.0: More Music from the Hit TV Show
"We Are Believix" (Winx Club featuring Elizabeth Gillies)	2012	—	—	—	—		Non-album promotional single
"Animal" (The Heathens featuring Elizabeth Gillies)	2015	—	—	—	—		Sex & Drugs & Rock & Roll (Songs from the FX Original Comedy Series)
"Desire" (The Assassins featuring Elizabeth Gillies)	2015	—	—	—	—		Sex & Drugs & Rock & Roll (Songs from the FX Original Comedy Series)
"New York 2015" (The Assassins featuring Elizabeth Gillies)	2015	—	—	—	—		Sex & Drugs & Rock & Roll (Songs from the FX Original Comedy Series)
"Die Trying" (The Assassins featuring Elizabeth Gillies)	2015	—	—	—	—		Sex & Drugs & Rock & Roll (Songs from the FX Original Comedy Series)
"Put It on Me" (The Assassins featuring Denis Leary and Elizabeth Gillies)	2015	—	—	—	—		Sex & Drugs & Rock & Roll (Songs from the FX Original Comedy Series)
"What's My Name" (The Assassins featuring Elizabeth Gillies)	2015	—	—	—	—		Sex & Drugs & Rock & Roll (Songs from the FX Original Comedy Series)
"Complicated" (The Assassins featuring Elizabeth Gillies)	2015	—	—	—	—		Sex & Drugs & Rock & Roll (Songs from the FX Original Comedy Series)
"Ain't No Valentine" (The Assassins featuring Elizabeth Gillies)	2016	—	—	—	—		Sex & Drugs & Rock & Roll (Songs from the FX Original Comedy Series) Season 2
"Don't Break Me Too" (The Assassins featuring Elizabeth Gillies)	2016	—	—	—	—		Sex & Drugs & Rock & Roll (Songs from the FX Original Comedy Series) Season 2
"Just Let Me Go" (The Assassins featuring Elizabeth Gillies)	2016	—	—	—	—		Sex & Drugs & Rock & Roll (Songs from the FX Original Comedy Series) Season 2
"Raise a Hand" (The Assassins featuring Elizabeth Gillies)	2016	—	—	—	—		Sex & Drugs & Rock & Roll (Songs from the FX Original Comedy Series) Season 2
"Already in Love" (The Assassins featuring Elizabeth Gillies)	2016	—	—	—	—		Sex & Drugs & Rock & Roll (Songs from the FX Original Comedy Series) Season 2
"So Many Miles" (The Assassins featuring Elizabeth Gillies)	2016	—	—	—	—		Sex & Drugs & Rock & Roll (Songs from the FX Original Comedy Series) Season 2
"Ain't We Got Fun?" (with Seth MacFarlane)	2020	—	—	*			Songs from Home
"It's a Good Day" (with Seth MacFarlane)	2020	—	—	*			Songs from Home
"Calcutta" (with Seth MacFarlane)	2020	—	—	*			Songs from Home
"Drinking Again" (with Seth MacFarlane)	2020	—	—	*			Songs from Home
"Better Than a Dream" (with Seth MacFarlane)	2020	—	—	*			Songs from Home
"It Doesn't Cost a Dime to Dream" (with Seth MacFarlane)	2020	—	—	*			Songs from Home
"Come to the Mardi Gras" (with Seth MacFarlane)	2020	—	—	*			Songs from Home
"This Could Be the Start of Something Big" (with Seth MacFarlane)	2020	—	—	*			Songs from Home
"Peachtree street" (With Seth MacFarlane)	2020	-	-	*			Songs from Home
"Cozy" (With Seth MacFarlane)	2020	-	-	*			Songs from Home
"More Than Me"	2021	—	—	*			Non-album promotional singles
"Have Yourself a Merry Little Christmas" (Eliza Bennett featuring Elizabeth Gillies)	2021	—	—	*			Non-album promotional singles
"What You've Done" (with Ferry Townes)	2024	—	—	*			Non-album promotional singles
"White Christmas" (with Seth MacFarlane)	2024	—	—				Non-album promotional singles
"Tale of an Average Man" (with Ferry Townes)	2024	—	—				Non-album promotional singles
"—" denotes items which did not chart in that country. "*" denotes the chart is discontinued.

== Other charted songs ==
List of other charted songs, with selected chart positions, showing year released and album name
Title	Year	Peak chart positions		Album
Title	Year	US Bub.	US Kid	Album
"Give It Up" (Victorious cast featuring Elizabeth Gillies and Ariana Grande)	2011	23	3	Victorious: Music from the Hit TV Show
"You Don't Know Me" (Victorious cast featuring Elizabeth Gillies)	2012	—	16	Victorious 3.0: Even More Music from the Hit TV Show
"—" denotes releases that did not chart.

== Other appearances ==
List of non-single guest appearances, showing year released, other artist(s) featured, and album name
Title	Year	Other artist(s)	Album
"Hey Kendra"	2008	Al Calderon, Malik Hammond, Eric Nelsen, Delaney Moro	13 (Original Broadway Cast Recording)
"Getting Ready"	2008	Aaron Simon Gross, Graham Phillips, Eric Nelsen, Delaney Moro, Allie Trimm	13 (Original Broadway Cast Recording)
"It Can't Be True"	2008	Caitlin Gann, 13 Original Broadway Cast	13 (Original Broadway Cast Recording)
"Baby Get Down"	2015	The Assassins, Elaine Hendrix	Sex & Drugs & Rock & Roll (Songs from the FX Original Comedy Series)
"Sex Bomb"	2015	None	Sex & Drugs & Rock & Roll (Songs from the FX Original Comedy Series)
"Dive In"	2016	Rebecca Naomi Jones	Sex & Drugs & Rock & Roll (Songs from the FX Original Comedy Series) Season 2
"My Buick, My Love and I"	2017	Seth MacFarlane	In Full Swing
"Movin' Right Along"	2026	Seth MacFarlane	Seth MacFarlane Sings the Muppets

== Music videos ==
List of music videos, showing year released, other artists featured and directors
Title	Year	Other artist(s)	Director(s)	Ref.
As an artist
"Take a Hint"	2012	Victorious cast Victoria Justice	Unknown	
"We Are Believix"	2012	Winx Club	Unknown	
"You Don't Know Me"	2012	Victorious cast	Unknown	
Guest appearances
"Make It Shine"	2010	Victorious cast Victoria Justice	Unknown	
"Freak the Freak Out"	2010	Victorious cast Victoria Justice	Marcus Wagner	
"Beggin' on Your Knees"	2011	Victorious cast Victoria Justice	Marcus Wagner	
"Leave It All to Shine"	2011	iCarly and Victorious casts Miranda Cosgrove; Victoria Justice	Unknown	
"All I Want Is Everything"	2011	Victorious cast Victoria Justice	Lex Halaby	
"Time in a Day"	2011	Mikey Deleasa	Unknown	
"Time of Our Life"	2012	Big Time Rush	Savage Steve Holland	
"Make It in America"	2012	Victorious cast Victoria Justice	Anna Mastro	
"L.A. Boyz"	2012	Victorious cast Victoria Justice; Ariana Grande	Unknown	
"Here's 2 Us"	2012	Victorious cast Victoria Justice	Unknown	
"Right There"	2013	Ariana Grande; Big Sean	Nev Todorovic	
"Thank U, Next"	2018	Ariana Grande	Hannah Lux Davis	
"Stuck with U"	2020	Ariana Grande; Justin Bieber	Scooter Braun; Rory Kramer; Alfredo Flores	
"The Boy Is Mine"	2024	Ariana Grande	Christian Breslauer	
