= Leave It All to Shine =

2011 single by iCarly and Victorious

Single by iCarly and Victorious casts featuring Miranda Cosgrove and Victoria Justice

from the album Victorious: Music from the Hit TV Show
- Released: June 10, 2011
- Genre: Pop; teen pop
- Length: 2:12
- Label: Nickelodeon; Columbia
- Songwriters: Łukasz Gottwald; Michael Corcoran; Dan Schneider
- Producers: Backhouse Mike; Dr. Luke

Victorious singles chronology
"Best Friend's Brother" (2011)	"Leave It All to Shine" (2011)	"It's Not Christmas Without You" (2011)

Miranda Cosgrove singles chronology
"Dancing Crazy" (2010)	"Leave It All to Shine" (2011)

Victoria Justice singles chronology
"Best Friend's Brother" (2011)	"Leave It All to Shine" (2011)	"It's Not Christmas Without You" (2011)

Music video
- "Leave It All to Shine" on YouTube

"Leave It All to Shine" is a song performed by the iCarly and Victorious casts featuring the American singers and actresses Miranda Cosgrove and Victoria Justice from Victorious's debut soundtrack album, Victorious: Music from the Hit TV Show (2011). It was released as the album's fifth single on June 10, 2011, through Columbia Records and Nickelodeon. The song was featured in the iCarly and Victorious television crossover movie titled iParty with Victorious.

"Leave It All to Shine" is a pop and teen pop track that features the usage of synthesizers, drum machine and Auto-Tune. The songs lyrics are a mashup of the theme songs from Victorious ("Make It Shine") and iCarly ("Leave It All to Me"). Music critics thought it was successful as a mashup and praised Cosgrove's and Justice's vocals. The song peaked at number 24 on the US Billboard Bubbling Under Hot 100 chart and number two on the US Kid Digital Song Sales chart.

== Background and release ==
In September 2010, Victorious actress Victoria Justice announced on Twitter that she was recording a mashup of the theme songs from Victorious and iCarly. During an interview with TV Guide in 2011, iCarly actress Miranda Cosgrove revealed that two weeks before filming scenes in the iCarly and Victorious television crossover, the casts of both shows recorded the mashup in a recording studio. Cosgrove said she was excited to sing with the Victorious cast and opined that she was surprised by how well everyone sounded. "Leave It All to Shine" was first released as a single on June 10, 2011, through Columbia Records in association with Nickelodeon Records.

The song was subsequently featured in the iCarly and Victorious television crossover movie iParty with Victorious, which aired the following day. The special features Carly (Cosgrove) dating a boy named Steven, who is also dating Tori (Justice). When Carly discovers a photo of Steven and Tori together, she suspects he is cheating and travels to Los Angeles with her friends. After revealing the truth to Tori, the two girls team up to expose Steven at a party thrown by Kenan Thompson. The main characters of the two shows then engage in a joint performance of "Leave It All to Shine". The song was then released as the final track on Victorious's debut soundtrack album Victorious: Music from the Hit TV Show on August 2, 2011.

== Music and composition ==
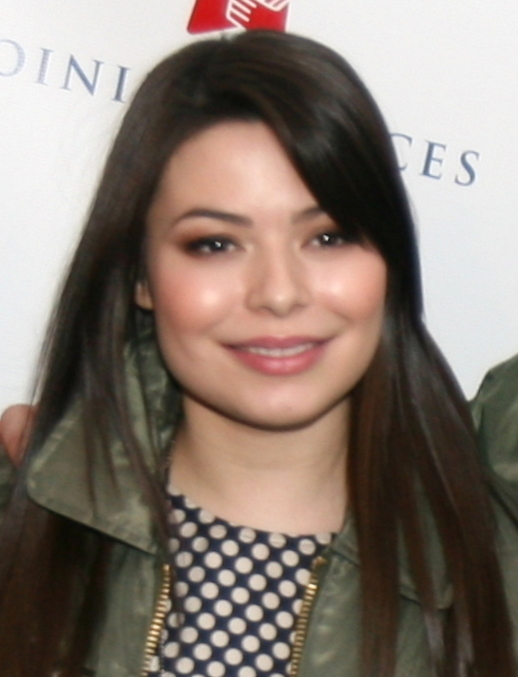
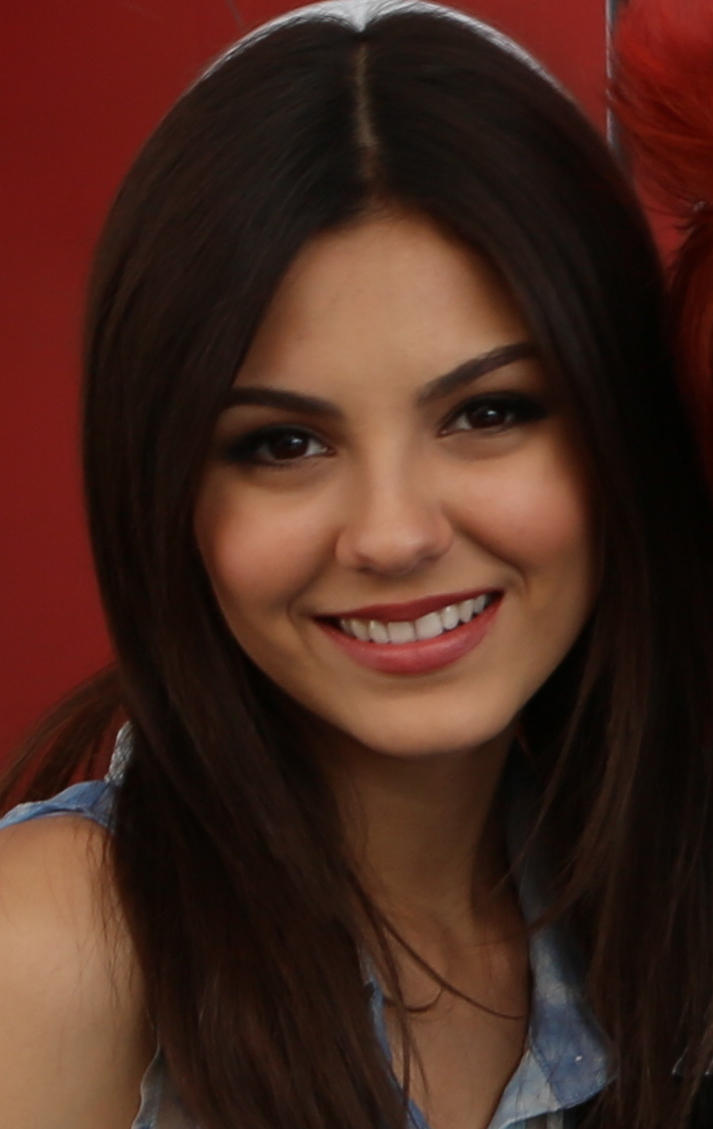
"Leave It All to Shine" features vocals from Miranda Cosgrove (left) and Victoria Justice (right).

The song features lead vocals from Cosgrove and Justice, with background vocals provided by members of both the iCarly and Victorious casts, including Ariana Grande, Avan Jogia, Daniella Monet, Elizabeth Gillies, Jennette McCurdy, Jerry Trainor, Leon Thomas III, Matt Bennett, Nathan Kress, and Noah Munck. Michael Corcoran contributed background vocals and also served as a writer, producer, and engineer for the track. Additional writing and production were handled by Łukasz Gottwald and the show's producer Dan Schneider. The song was mixed by Greg Wells and mastered by Brian Gardner.

"Leave It All to Shine" is a mashup of the theme songs from Victorious ("Make It Shine", originally performed by Justice) and iCarly ("Leave It All to Me", originally performed by Cosgrove and featuring Drake Bell). "Leave It All to Shine" blends lines from the theme songs of both shows, with the lyrics: "Live life/Breathe air/I know somehow we're gonna get there/And feel so wonderful." "Leave It All to Shine" is a pop and teen pop song, with William Ruhlmann for AllMusic writing that the track has "relentless beats, synthesized instrumentations, nonstop simple, repetitive choruses, and Auto-Tune vocals".

== Critical reception ==
Joe DeAndrea, writing for AbsolutePunk, described "Leave It All to Shine" as a "true highlight", calling it "another [Dan] Schneider gem". Chloe Pryor of The Vanderbilt Hustler revealed that the track was one of her "favorite songs". For The Michigan Daily, Oscar Nollette-Patulski gave the song a positive review, stating that he and his friends "danced in the car seats by shifting shoulders and overly contorting our faces to the lyrics, full of now-trivial teenage drama". Nicholas Howe of Comic Book Resources described the iCarly and Victorious casts' performance of the song in the movie as one of its "notable moments". Catie Curry for Girls' Life stated that "you'll heart the bonus track", commenting that it is an "awesome mash-up".

The staff of Cambio labeled it as a "sweet mashup", while Denise Martin from TV Guide wrote Cosgrove and Justice celebrated their "girl power" to the song. Amy Sciarretto of PopCrush labeled the track as a "bouncy, shiny, happy song with harmonies so sugary they will give you a mouthful of cavities in an instant". She believed that it was so "bright-eyed and bushy-tailed that you can't help but want to sing and dance along". Tiara B, writing for The Shade Room, put the song at number ten on her "Victorious: The Top 10 Songs That Still Have Us Hooked" list, mentioning that the track is "cemented in Nickelodeon crossover history", and opining that it is a "true moment that brought Victorious and iCarly fans together".

=== Commercial performance ===
"Leave It All to Shine" debuted and peaked at number 24 on the US Billboard Bubbling Under Hot 100 chart dated July 2, 2011, lasting one week on the chart. It also peaked at number two on the US Kid Digital Song Sales chart. "Leave It All to Shine" ranked at number 23 on the 2011 Kid Digital Song Sales year-end chart.

== Credits and personnel ==
Credits adapted from Tidal.

- Miranda Cosgrove – vocals
- Victoria Justice – vocals
- Ariana Grande—background vocals
- Avan Jogia – background vocals
- Daniella Monet – background vocals
- Elizabeth Gillies – background vocals
- Jennette McCurdy – background vocals
- Jerry Trainor – background vocals
- Leon Thomas III – background vocals
- Matt Bennett – background vocals
- Nathan Kress – background vocals
- Noah Munck – background vocals
- Michael Corcoran – background vocals, writer, producer, engineer
- Łukasz Gottwald – writer, producer
- Dan Schneider – writer
- Brian Gardner – mastering engineer
- Greg Wells – mixing engineer

== Charts ==
=== Weekly charts ===
Chart (2011)	Peak position
US Bubbling Under Hot 100 (Billboard)	24
US Kid Digital Song Sales (Billboard)	2

=== Year-end charts ===
Chart (2011)	Position
US Kid Digital Song Sales (Billboard)	23
