= You're the Reason (Victorious song) =

2011 single by Victorious cast

- Cover of the acoustic version

Single by Victorious cast featuring Victoria Justice

from the album Victorious: Music from the Hit TV Show
- Released: December 3, 2011
- Genre: Pop; electro
- Length: 2:53
- Label: Nickelodeon; Columbia
- Songwriters: Michael Corcoran; CJ Abraham; Dan Schneider
- Producers: Backhouse Mike; The Super Chris; Greg Wells

Victorious singles chronology
"It's Not Christmas Without You" (2011)	"You're the Reason" (2011)	"Countdown" (2012)

Victoria Justice singles chronology
"It's Not Christmas Without You" (2011)	"You're the Reason" (2011)	"Countdown" (2012)

Music video
- "You're The Reason" (Acoustic Version) on YouTube

"You're the Reason" is a song by the Victorious cast featuring American actress and singer Victoria Justice. The song was released on December 3, 2011, as the sixth and final single from Victorious's soundtrack album Victorious: Music from the Hit TV Show (2011). An acoustic version of the song was also released on the same day as the single's release. The song was featured on the show, where Tori Vega (Justice) performs the song for her sister Trina Vega's (Daniella Monet) "birth week".

Musically, the song is a uptempo pop and electro ballad with lyrics about a person appreciating their crazy friend. "You're the Reason" mainly received positive reviews from music critics, with some praising Justice's vocals. The song peaked at number 24 on the US Billboard Bubbling Under Hot 100 chart and number one on the US Kid Digital Song Sales chart. A music video for the acoustic version of the song was released in December 2011, depicting Justice performing the song on a piano at a beach. Justice performed the song live throughout 2012.

== Background and release ==
"You're the Reason" was featured in the American television sitcom Victorious episode titled "The Birthweek Song" episode. In the episode, Tori Vega (Victoria Justice) has trouble finding her sister, Trina Vega (Daniella Monet), a "birth week" present. Andre Harris (Leon Thomas III) suggests they write a song for her. Tori and Andre perform "You're the Reason" for Trina, accompanied by several dancers.

The song was first released as the sixth track for the show's soundtrack album Victorious: Music from the Hit TV Show on August 2, 2011, through Columbia Records in association with Nickelodeon Records. It was later issued as the soundtrack's sixth and final single on December 3, 2011. An acoustic rendition of the track was also released on December 3 of that year.

== Writing and music ==
Justice provides the lead vocals on the track, with Niki Watkins contributing background vocals. The song was written by the show's producer Dan Schneider, Michael Corcoran, and CJ Abraham. Corcoran contributed background vocals and worked on production and engineering. Abraham also provided background vocals and co-wrote and co-produced the song while handling keyboards. Greg Wells served as another producer and mixing engineer, while the track was mastered by Brian Gardner.

Music critics have described "You're the Reason" as a uptempo pop and electro ballad. (Note: Attributed to multiple references:) Bob Hoose and Steven Isaac for Plugged In stated that the song's lyrics about thanking a "crazy but supportive friend for being the inspiration for newfound courage", highlighting the lines: "Now no matter what it is/I'm not afraid to try." The joint website of Bop and Tiger Beat pointed out the lyrics: "Have I told you lately that I love you? You're the only reason that I'm not afraid to fly."

== Critical reception ==
The joint website of Bop and Tiger Beat stated that the song "makes us stop and think about the people in our lives who have changed us and who push us to always let our best selves shine". Autumn McAlpin, writing for The Orange County Register, called the song a "dedicatory ballad". The staff of Teen Vogue described "You're the Reason" as an "inspirational ballad-type tune", commenting that it "will keep you going during endless study sessions". The staff of Cambio labeled the track as a "beautiful ballad". The staff of Complex added that "while her first hit 'Freak the Freak Out' could be dismissed as your typical pop song", they opined that it was "'You're the Reason' that showcased the beauty’s raw vocal talent". Priscilla Rodriguez for Teen.com praised the acoustic version of the song, noting that "if any of you ever doubted Justice's vocal skills, this acoustic version of 'You're the Reason' is going to prove you wrong". Kelly Ballhorn of RyanSeacrest.com mentioned Justice showed her "amazing vocal talents" on the acoustic version. Mark Wedel of the Kalamazoo Gazette described the studio version of "You're the Reason" as "heavy-handed" and stated Justice's vocals are "drenched in Auto-Tune". He expressed a preference for the acoustic version, noting that Justice's "strong voice sounded like something that parents just might have on their iPods".

=== Commercial performance ===
"You're the Reason" debuted and peaked at number 24 on the US Billboard Bubbling Under Hot 100 chart dated January 12, 2012, lasting one week. It also peaked at number one on the US Kid Digital Song Sales chart.

== Music video ==
A music video for the acoustic rendition of "You're the Reason" was released in December 2011 on Nickelodeon. The music video was later uploaded to the official Victorious YouTube channel on September 21, 2012. The video was directed by Wayne Isham and filmed at Zuma Beach in Malibu, California, as well as a location called the Enchanted Forest. The visual features Justice wearing a red dress while performing the song on a piano customized with lightbulbs at a beach and in a forest, along with scenes of her running along the shoreline.

In an interview with Cambio, Justice explained that the concept of the video centers on her moving around with her piano. She noted that the style in the visual reflected with what she liked and shared that she dedicated the song to her mother. In an interview with Twist magazine, Justice stated that she enjoyed the process of filming the video, noting that it allowed her to express herself and have fun with the music. The staff of Teen Vogue described the music video as "cute" and "enchanting", stating that it would "transport you away from the books for a few minutes". The staff of Perez Hilton.com opined that the video "looks amazing". Dyan Zarzuela for Candy Magazine stated that while "you've heard Justice's 'You're the Reason'", the video "showcases the amazing ballad version".

== Live performances ==
Justice performed "You're the Reason" live at the 2012 Great Allentown Fair, shouting out her mother to the audience and thanking her for her support. Justice also performed the song at the 2012 Allegan County Fair.

== Credits and personnel ==
Credits adapted from Tidal.

- Victoria Justice – vocals
- Niki Watkins – background vocals
- Michael Corcoran – background vocals, writer, producer, engineer, associated performer
- CJ Abraham – background vocals, writer, producer, keyboards
- Greg Wells – producer, mixing engineer
- Dan Schneider – writer
- Brian Gardner – mastering engineer

== Charts ==
Chart (2011–2012)	Peak position
US Bubbling Under Hot 100 (Billboard)	24
US Kid Digital Song Sales (Billboard)	1
