= Sonny Wern =

Dutch dj and music producer

Damian Twilt, known professionally as Sonny Wern, is a Dutch DJ and record producer.

== Life ==
Sonny Wern started playing the drums at the age of eight. In his youth he produced and published hip-hop beats. Later, he started DJing and became known regionally as a DJ.

In 2021, he started publishing his own music. The same year, he published the first song he produced, "Red Lipstick (Hey What's Up It's 616)", together with Huts and Gang Speed. He worked together with many different musicians, and published the song "Let U Go" together with Jordan Jay and Idetto. This title was popular on the music-streaming plattform Spotify.

In January 2023, he published a techno-remix of the song "Dance for Me (1, 2, 3)". The original song had been published in the same month by the producers Lyente and Quinten Circle with singer Zana. The remix gained popularity on the social-media plattform TikTok and reached number 44 on the German single charts.

== Discography ==
Chart performance for Dance for Me (1, 2, 3)
Chart	Peak position
Germany (GfK)	44

=== Singles ===
- 2021: Red Lipstick (Hey What's Up It's 616) (with Huts and Gang Speed)
- 2021: Blinding Lights (with New Beat Order)
- 2021: Faded (with Huts and Idetto)
- 2021: Different Person (Lola's Theme) (with Agatino Romero)
- 2021: Prayer in A (with New Beat Order)
- 2021: Turn off the Lights (with Sadboy)
- 2021: Time (Sonny Wern Remix) (with Tvilling)
- 2021: Hypnotized (with Fabian Farell, Azault & Fee van Deelen)
- 2021: Moth to a Flame (with Off Topic)
- 2021: Let U Go (with Jordan Jay & Idetto)
- 2022: Holding Out (with Off Topic & Leshii)
- 2022: Mr. Lonely (with Giuseppe Vittoria)
- 2022: Down Under (with Gang Speed & Hey Colin!)
- 2022: Say Goodby (with Max Fail)
- 2022: Crazy (with Leoneer)
- 2022: Wizard (with DJSM)
- 2022: Running Up That Hill (with Dimmalou & Off Topic)
- 2022: Let’s Get Loud (with Quinten Circle & Dimmalou)
- 2022: Don't Blame Me (Oh Lord Save Me) (with Kajak & Nightcore)
- 2022: Tough Love (with Lyente)
- 2022: Worth It (with Kajak)
- 2022: Doja (with Quinten Circle)
- 2022: Mad Love (with Kajak)
- 2022: Vivir Mi Vida (with Mastik Lickers, Audiosonik & Benavides)
- 2022: No Scrubs (with DJSM)
- 2022: Just Dance (with Idetto & Nightcore)
- 2023: Out My Mind (with Jordan Jay & MCN2)
- 2023: Leave Me Tomorrow (with Jordan Jay, Kajak & French Original)
- 2023: Get the Party Started
- 2023: Players
- 2023: Chasing Highs (with Dimmalou)
- 2023: Mi Amor (with Miles & Miles)
- 2023: Makeba (with BXT)
- 2023: Disturbia (with Jonix & Lawstylez)
- 2023: Make It Shine (Victorious Theme) (with Nikster & Dimmalou)
- 2023: Rhythm of the Night (Techno)
- 2023: Rock My Body (with Sash!) (with R3hab, Inna & Sash!)
- 2023: Tattoo (with Kajak)
- 2023: Dance for Me (1,2,3) (Stutter Techno) (with Lyente, Quinten Circle & Zana)
- 2023: NRG (Sonny Wern Remix) (with Jazzy)
- 2024: I Like To Move It (Muévelo) (with Daddy Yankee)
- 2024: Mirror on the Wall
- 2024: Stumblin' In (Sonny Wern Remix) (with CYRIL)
