= Best Friend's Brother =

2011 single by Victorious cast

Single by Victorious cast featuring Victoria Justice

from the album Victorious: Music from the Hit TV Show
- Released: May 20, 2011
- Studio: Mound; Westlake; Rocket Carousel (Los Angeles, California)
- Genre: Pop; synth-pop
- Length: 3:39
- Label: Nickelodeon; Columbia
- Songwriters: Allan Grigg; Savan Kotecha; Victoria Justice
- Producer: Kool Kojak

Victorious singles chronology
"Beggin' on Your Knees" (2011)	"Best Friend's Brother" (2011)	"Leave It All to Shine" (2011)

Victoria Justice singles chronology
"Beggin' on Your Knees" (2011)	"Best Friend's Brother" (2011)	"Leave It All to Shine" (2011)

Music video
- "Best Friend's Brother" on YouTube

"Best Friend's Brother" is a song performed by the Victorious cast featuring American singer Victoria Justice from the show's debut soundtrack album, Victorious: Music from the Hit TV Show (2011). The song was written by Justice, Kool Kojak, and Savan Kotecha, with production being handled solely by Kool Kojak. It was released as the fourth single from the album on May 20, 2011, through Columbia Records in association with Nickelodeon. The song later appeared in a Victorious episode, where Tori Vega (Justice), Cat Valentine (Ariana Grande), and Andre Harris (Leon Thomas III) perform the song during their high school's prom.

"Best Friend's Brother" is an uptempo and upbeat pop and synth-pop song with lyrics about a girl being infatuated with her best friend's brother. The song was met with generally positive reviews from critics, with the majority of them praising the melody. It peaked at number 86 on the US Billboard Hot 100 and number one on the US Kid Digital Song Sales chart. An accompanying music video was released in May 2011 and portrays Justice dreaming of attracting her best friend's brother.

== Release and usage in Victorious ==
"Best Friend's Brother" was released as a single on May 20, 2011. The song was then featured on the American television sitcom Victorious in an episode titled "Prom Wrecker" the following day. In the episode, Tori Vega (Victoria Justice) has her friends help her set up Hollywood Arts High School's first prom, inadvertently ruining a play meant for her frenemy Jade West (Elizabeth Gillies) for that day. Seeking vengeance, Jade tries to sabotage the prom while Tori tries to stop her. The episode concludes with Tori, Cat Valentine (Ariana Grande), and Andre Harris (Leon Thomas III) performing "Best Friend's Brother" in the pouring rain as the prom attendees dance along. "Best Friend's Brother" was then released as the third track on the show's debut soundtrack album, Victorious: Music from the Hit TV Show, on August 2, 2011.

== Writing and music ==
Justice wrote "Best Friend's Brother" when she was 17 years old, along with Kool Kojak and Savan Kotecha. Justice told Teen.com that the idea for the song came to her while she was in the studio with Kool Kojak and Kotecha. She said they were having a hard time thinking of a song, and the concept for "Best Friend's Brother" came to her.

Kool Kojak also produced the track, along with providing all the instruments and programming for it. The mixing for the song was provided by Greg Wells and took place at Rocket Carousel in Los Angeles, California with the engineering provided by Mighty Mike Garity at Westlake Studios and Mound Studios, both of which are also in Los Angeles.

In an interview with Seventeen magazine, Justice revealed that "Best Friend's Brother" was inspired by an attraction she had to her friend's older brother when she was 14. She stated the group would hang out at her friend's home, where they would play video games and go swimming. Justice mentioned that she and her friend's brother appeared to like each other, but never pursued a relationship. She explained that she did not want to jeopardize her friendship by trying to date her friend's older brother.

During an interview with Teen Vogue, Justice revealed that Victorious producer Dan Schneider liked the song and asked that she include it in the show. Musically, "Best Friend's Brother" is an upbeat and uptempo pop and synth-pop song. The song's lyrics are about a girl obsessing over her best friend's older brother: "I don't want to, but I want to/'Cause I just can't get him out of my mind/Yeah, yeah, yeah yeah/My best friend's brother is the one for me!/BFB!/BFB!"

== Reception ==
Professional ratings
Review scores
Source	Rating
Common Sense Media	3/5 stars

"Best Friend's Brother" received positive reviews from music critics. Jessica Dawson, writing for Common Sense Media, mentioned that while the song's "music and lyrics aren't groundbreaking", she stated that it was "catchy and fun" and would be heavily rotated on many teenagers' playlists. She thought that while the single's message "might be a little sketchy for younger kids", the song is "innocent enough and has no bad language or iffy content". Jason Lipshutz, for Billboard magazine, mentioned that the song "zip[s] along with compact hooks and unabashed attitude". The staff of J-14 magazine stated that "Best Friend's Brother" has a "super catchy chorus". Kaitlin Cubria of Teen.com said the song is an "anthem for forbidden love".

Jocelyn Vena for MTV labeled the track as "catchy", comparing it to Katy Perry's 2011 hit single "Last Friday Night (T.G.I.F.)". Nancy J. Parisi of The Buffalo News emphasized Justice's theme of being infatuated with her best friend's brother, describing the song as "ultra-direct". Mark Wedel for the Kalamazoo Gazette wrote that the song has "positive lyrics for strong young women". Brendan Wetmore of Elite Daily labeled the song as a "gem", noting that while Justice was busy working on her debut album, the song would "hold us over". The staff of In Touch Weekly opined "Best Friend's Brother" is a "smash single". Tiara B, writing for The Shade Room, put the song at number eight on her "Victorious: The Top 10 Songs That Still Have Us Hooked" list, labeling it as a "shoot-your-shot anthem". Writing for Her Campus, Megan Gaertner and Allison Kane placed the song at number two on their "the Best Songs from Victorious" list, saying it is "just so catchy".

=== Commercial performance ===
"Best Friend's Brother" debuted at number 93 on the US Billboard Hot 100 chart dated June 18, 2011. The song later peaked at number 86 on the chart, lasting four weeks on the chart and giving Justice her third Hot 100 hit in the United States. "Best Friend's Brother" also peaked at number one on the US Kid Digital Song Sales chart, number 27 on the US Pop Digital Song Sales chart, and number 65 on the US Digital Song Sales chart. "Best Friend's Brother" was listed at number four on the 2011 Kid Digital Song Sales year-end chart.

== Promotion ==
A music video for " Best Friend's Brother" was first released in May 2011 on Nickelodeon. It was subsequently uploaded to the official Victorious YouTube channel on September 20, 2012. The video features Justice being attracted to her best friend's older brother, Daniel Romer, and daydreaming about him. It also features other members of the Victorious cast. Rachel Sheehan for J-14 opined that the visual "was such a cute concept", while the joint website of Bop and Tiger Beat stated that the "video is one of our faves".

Before filming the music video, Justice learned the choreography at a dance studio to prepare for the performance. In October 2011, J-14 promoted the song by launching a contest that offered one winner and a friend the opportunity to fly to Los Angeles and meet Justice. Justice performed the song live during her 2012 and 2013 tours. In 2022 and 2023, fellow Victorious actor Matt Bennett performed the song live during some of his DJ concert sets.

== Credits and personnel ==
Credits are taken from Victorious liner notes.

- Victoria Justice – vocals, songwriting
- Ariana Grande – backup vocals
- Leon Thomas III – backup vocals, guitar
- Allan Grigg – songwriting, production, programming, instrumentation
- Savan Kotecha – songwriting
- Greg Wells – mixing
- Mighty Mike Garity – engineer

== Charts ==
=== Weekly charts ===
Chart (2011)	Peak position
US Billboard Hot 100	86
US Kid Digital Song Sales (Billboard)	1
US Pop Digital Song Sales (Billboard)	27

=== Year-end charts ===
Chart (2011)	Position
US Kid Digital Song Sales (Billboard)	4
