= Make It Shine =

2010 single by Victoria Justice

Single by Victorious cast featuring Victoria Justice

from the album Victorious: Music from the Hit TV Show
- Released: April 13, 2010
- Genre: Pop; pop rock; candy pop; teen pop
- Length: 3:07
- Label: Nickelodeon; Columbia
- Songwriters: Łukasz Gottwald; Michael Corcoran; Dan Schneider
- Producer: Dr. Luke

Victorious singles chronology
"Make It Shine" (2010)	"Freak the Freak Out" (2010)

Victoria Justice singles chronology
"Make It Shine" (2010)	"Freak the Freak Out" (2010)

"Make It Shine" (alternatively titled "Make It Shine (Victorious Theme)") is a song performed by the cast of the American teen-comedy television show Victorious which includes the singer and actress Victoria Justice. The song appears on the show's debut soundtrack album, Victorious: Music from the Hit TV Show (2011), and was released as the album's first single on April 13, 2010, through Columbia Records and Nickelodeon. The song premiered on the pilot episode of Victorious and served as the show's theme song.

"Make It Shine" is a pop, pop rock, candy pop, and teen pop song whose lyrics encourage a person to follow their dreams. Music critics said it was successful as a theme song and praised Justice's vocals. The song peaked at number 16 on the US Billboard Bubbling Under Hot 100 chart and entered secondary charts in the United States. Justice performed the song live in 2012 and Matt Bennett sang it with the audience during Ariana Grande's Sweetener World Tour in November 2019.

== Release ==
"Make It Shine" was debuted on the pilot episode of the Nickelodeon American television sitcom Victorious on March 27, 2010. Tori Vega (Victoria Justice) performs the song after standing in for her sister, which leads to her acceptance into Hollywood Arts High School. The song was released as a single on April 13, 2010, and was used as the theme song of Victorious. "Make It Shine" was released as the first track of the show's debut soundtrack album, Victorious: Music from the Hit TV Show, on August 2, 2011. A remix of the song is featured in the episode "Helen Back Again", which aired on September 10, 2011. In the episode, Tori performs the remix for Hollywood Arts' new principal after they require the students to re-audition so they can continue attending the school.

== Composition ==
"Make It Shine"
"Make It Shine" as heard in the Victorious theme

"Make It Shine" was written by Michael Corcoran, Dr. Luke, and the show's producer Dan Schneider. Justice sings the lead vocals and Niki Watkins sings background vocals. Corcoran performed drums, keyboards, and programming. Dr. Luke produce the song, and added guitar, drums, keyboards, and programming. The track was mastered by Brian Gardner and mixed by Serban Ghenea, and Emily Wright was the recording engineer and editor. Additional engineering was provided by John Hanes with assistance from Tim Roberts.

Music critics have described "Make It Shine" as a pop, pop rock, candy pop, and teen pop track. The song's lyrics encourage listeners to work hard and continue following their dreams: "You don't have to be afraid to put your dream in action / You're never gonna fade / You'll be the main attraction / 'Cause you know that if you're livin' your imagination / Tomorrow you'll be everybody's fascination." According to Bob Hoose and Steven Isaac, writing for Plugged In, it is about teenagers "who worry about being invisible but hope and dream of soon making their stardom-earning mark". William Ruhlmann for AllMusic wrote that the track has "relentless beats, synthesized instrumentations, nonstop simple, repetitive choruses, and Auto-Tune vocals".

== Critical reception ==
Brenton Blanchet of Billboard described "Make It Shine" as an "ever-catchy theme performance". Writing for The Post-Standard, Mark Bialczak described the theme song as Justice's "first hit single". The staff of HelloGiggles said it is a "bop of a theme song". The joint website of Bop and Tiger Beat labeled it a "great song" and stated it "instantly puts us in a great mood". Cassandra R Lopez of Girls' Life said: "you had to reach for a makeshift microphone as soon as you heard Tori's voice start belting". In a negative review, Hoose and Isaac stated while the track is not "crass or violent or sexual", the lyrics in "Make It Shine" are "not the best message for kids when everything in their world is tugging them toward their 15 minutes of fame".

Kendra Beltran, writing for Yardbarker, placed "Make It Shine" at number 22 on her list of the 27 best television theme songs of the 21st century, calling it a "great theme song". Writing for MTV News, Crystal Bell ranked the track at number 16 on her list of "The 17 Best Nickelodeon Theme Songs, Ranked", saying she considered both "Make It Shine" and Unfabulous' theme song before ultimately selecting the Victorious theme song. Writing for Her Campus, Megan Gaertner and Allison Kane placed the song at number six on their "Best Songs from Victorious" list, describing the track as "uplifting and catchy". Tiara B for The Shade Room put the song at number one on her "Victorious: The Top 10 Songs That Still Have Us Hooked" list, calling it a "bop" and "iconic theme song".

=== Commercial performance ===
In May 2010, "Make It Shine" peaked at number 16 on the US Billboard Bubbling Under Hot 100 chart, staying five weeks on the chart. The song also peaked at number six on the US Kid Digital Song Sales chart, number 17 on the US Heatseekers Songs chart, and number 39 on the US Pop Digital Song Sales chart. "Make It Shine" ranked at number 22 on the 2011 Kid Digital Song Sales year-end chart.

== Live performance and promotion ==
To promote "Make It Shine", Justice performed it live in 2011 and 2012. "Make It Shine" was included on the track listing for the 2013 video game Just Dance Kids 2014. On November 19, 2019, during fellow Victorious actress Ariana Grande's Sweetener World Tour at State Farm Arena in Atlanta, Georgia, fellow cast member Matt Bennett joined the crowd and sang "Make It Shine" with them. From 2022 to 2023, Bennett performed the song live during some of his DJ concert sets.

== Credits and personnel ==
Credits adapted from Tidal.

- Victoria Justice – vocals
- Niki Watkins – background vocals
- Dan Schneider – writer
- Michael Corcoran – writer, drums, keyboards, programmer
- Łukasz Gottwald – writer, producer, guitar, drums, keyboards, programmer
- Brian Gardner – mastering engineer
- Serban Ghenea – mixing engineer
- Emily Wright – recording engineer, editor
- John Hanes – engineer
- Tim Roberts – assistant engineer

== Charts ==
=== Weekly charts ===
Chart (2010–2011)	Peak position
US Bubbling Under Hot 100 (Billboard)	16
US Heatseekers Songs (Billboard)	17
US Kid Digital Song Sales (Billboard)	6
US Pop Digital Song Sales (Billboard)	39

=== Year-end charts ===
Chart (2011)	Position
US Kid Digital Song Sales (Billboard)	22
