= All I Want Is Everything (Victorious song) =

Song by Victorious cast featuring Victoria Justice

from the album Victorious: Music from the Hit TV Show
- Released: August 2, 2011
- Length: 3:02
- Label: Nickelodeon; Columbia
- Songwriters: Toby Gad; Lindy Robbins
- Producers: Toby Gad; Michael Corcoran; Greg Wells

Music videos
- "All I Want Is Everything" on YouTube; "All I Want Is Everything (flash mob)" on YouTube

"All I Want Is Everything" is a song by the Victorious cast featuring American actress and singer Victoria Justice. The song first appeared on a one-hour Victorious special titled "Locked Up!" on July 30, 2011. The track was then officially released on Victorious: Music from the Hit TV Show, the show's debut soundtrack album on August 2, 2011. It was written by Toby Gad and Lindy Robbins.

The track references Madonna and Michael Jackson and centers on the theme of aspiring to achieve fame. The song peaked at number two on the US Billboard Kid Digital Song Sales chart. An accompanying music video was released in September 2011 and was later added to the official Victorious YouTube channel on September 21, 2012. The visual portrays Justice and the Victorious cast trying to help her impress her crush.

== Background and release ==
"All I Want Is Everything" first appeared on the Nickelodeon television sitcom Victorious in a one-hour special titled "Locked Up!" on July 30, 2011. The episode features Tori Vega (Victoria Justice) as she wins a free vacation for herself and her friends in a fictional country called Yerba. The trip quickly goes wrong when Tori accidentally strikes the Yerbanian chancellor in the eye with her shoe, resulting in her and later her friends being put in jail. The song was officially released as the fifth track on the show's debut soundtrack album Victorious: Music from the Hit TV Show on August 2, 2011.

== Music and lyrics ==
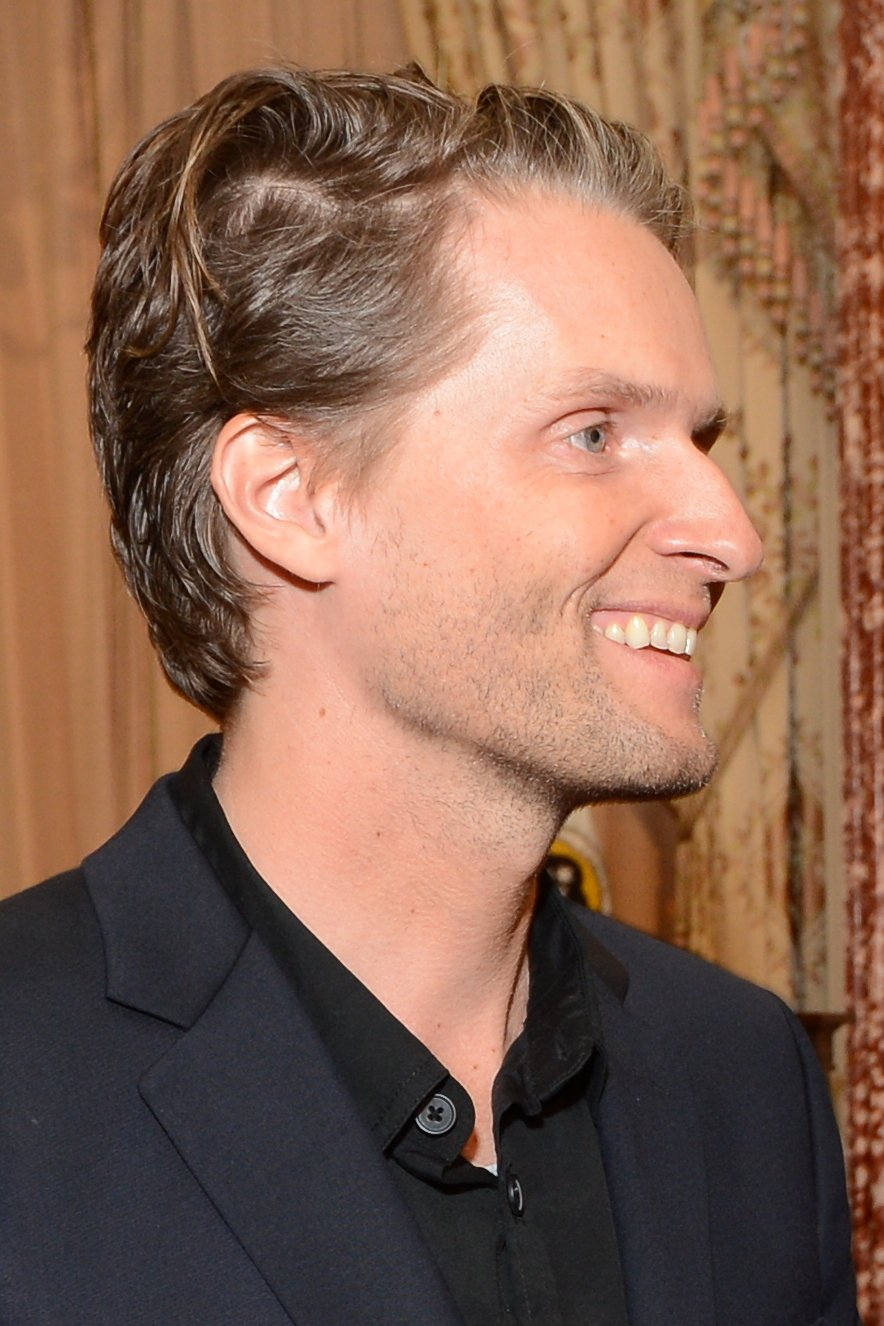
"All I Want Is Everything" was produced and co-written by Toby Gad (pictured in 2013)

Justice provides the lead vocals and is credited as an associated performer, with background vocals contributed by the fellow Victorious castmates Ariana Grande, Elizabeth Gillies, and Leon Thomas III. The song was written by Toby Gad and Lindy Robbins, with Gad also serving as producer, recording engineer, and associated performer. Gad additionally handled programming, guitar, bass, and keyboards. Greg Wells also contributed as a producer, associated performer, mixing engineer, and provided programming and keyboards. Michael Corcoran contributed as a producer and was mastered by Brian Gardner.

Musically, "All I Want Is Everything" is an upbeat track with lyrics about Justice going after her crush while referencing musicians Michael Jackson and Madonna. Justice stated in an interview that the song is "about wanting something really, really badly and not being afraid to go for it", mentioning that "the moment is now, so take a chance and do it". Bob Hoose and Steven Isaac for Plugged In described "All I Want Is Everything" as a "driving, scratch-and-claw cry for stardom," highlighting the lyrics: "Too much is not enough / I'm sick of settling for in between / ... We'll sleep when we're dead / 'Cause halfway kinda sucks." Jessica Dawson for Common Sense Media commented that it is "all about giving the best of yourself, even when people might tell you that you don't measure up".

== Live performances and reception ==
Justice performed "All I Want Is Everything" live at the Pacific Amphitheatre in California in August 2012. Justice also performed the song live at the 2012 Allegan County Fair. In January 2020, Grande and Matt Bennett posted a clip of themselves singing "All I Want Is Everything" on social media while staying at Disneyland.

Dawson labeled the track as one of the soundtracks "standouts", opining that it is a "fast-paced, power-anthem". Wedel, writing for Kalamazoo Gazette, described "All I Want Is Everything" as "demanding". The joint website of Bop and Tiger Beat gave the song a positive review, stating that it "totally get[s] stuck in our heads". Mike Hess for Celebuzz opined that the song has "hype and intrigue" for fans of the show. William Ruhlmann for AllMusic expressed his dislike of the song for mentioning Madonna and Jackson, opining that it "gives away the antecedents". Commercially, "All I Want Is Everything" charted at number two on the Billboard Kid Digital Song Sales chart in the United States.

== Music videos ==
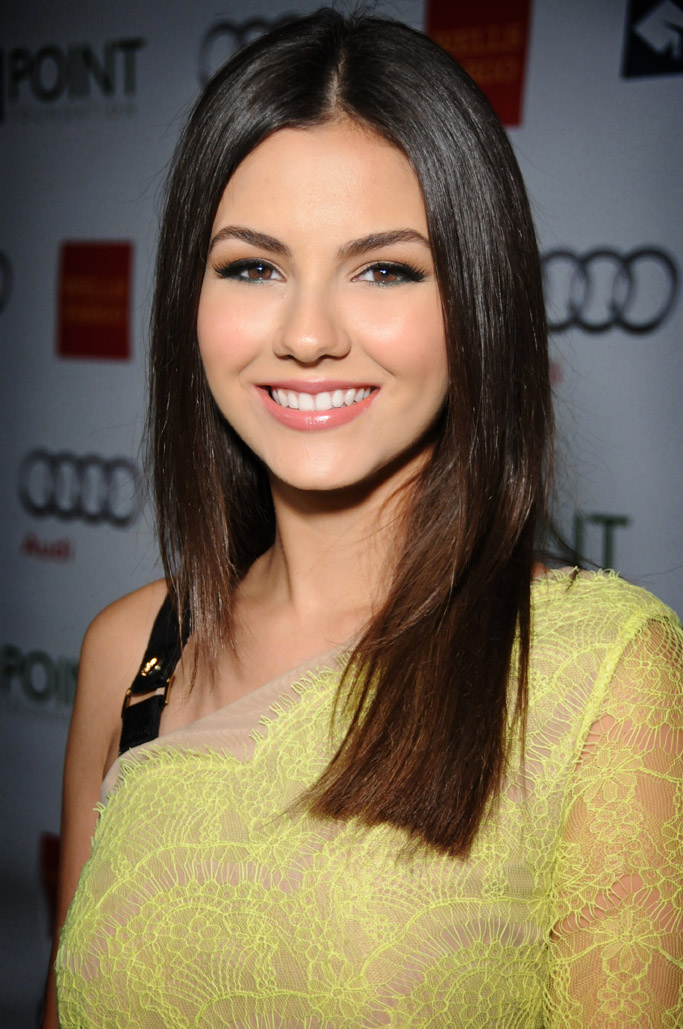
The music video features Justice (pictured in 2013) attempting to go out with her crush.

A music video for "All I Want Is Everything" was first released in September 2011. It was later uploaded to the official Victorious YouTube channel on September 20, 2012. The video was filmed in downtown Los Angeles, with Justice and the dancers having only a few hours to learn the choreography before shooting began. The music video shows Justice and the Victorious cast attempting to help her impress her crush, Dean Stanland. It shows Justice singing while jumping on her bed, using social media, recording herself performing the song, trying on various outfits as she poses, and dancing with different people. The video ends on a cliffhanger with Justice and Stanland planning a date.

A flash mob music video for "All I Want Is Everything" was released later that same month. It was then added to the Victorious YouTube account on September 25, 2012. It serves as a conclusion to the cliffhanger of the previous video, showing Justice and Stanland getting together. It also features Justice and the rest of the Victorious cast performing a choreographed dance in front of Stanland and a crowd of fans of the show at Universal CityWalk. Priscilla Rodriguez of Teen.com labeled the visual as "super cute". The staff of Cambio described the video as "adorable" and compared its style to the American teen sitcom Lizzie McGuire. The staff of MTV News stated that Justice "looks like she is one determined young woman".

== Credits and personnel ==
Credits adapted from Tidal.

- Victoria Justice – vocals, associated performer
- Ariana Grande – background vocals
- Elizabeth Gillies – background vocals
- Leon Thomas III – background vocals
- Toby Gad – writer, producer, associated performer, recording engineer, programming, guitar, bass, keyboards
- Greg Wells – producer, associated performer, mixing engineer, programming, keyboard
- Michael Corcoran – producer
- Lindy Robbins – writer
- Brian Gardner – mastering engineer

== Charts ==
Chart (2011)	Peak position
US Kid Digital Song Sales (Billboard)	2
