= Beggin' on Your Knees =

2011 single by Victorious cast

Single by Victorious cast featuring Victoria Justice

from the album Victorious: Music from the Hit TV Show
- Released: April 1, 2011
- Studio: CMK Island (Los Angeles, California); Maratome (Stockholm, Sweden); MixStar (Virginia Beach, Virginia); Westlake (Los Angeles, California)
- Genre: Pop; synth-pop
- Length: 3:14
- Label: Nickelodeon; Columbia
- Songwriters: Shellback; Savan Kotecha
- Producers: Shellback; Kristian Lundin

Victorious singles chronology
"Freak the Freak Out" (2010)	"Beggin' on Your Knees" (2011)	"Best Friend's Brother" (2011)

Victoria Justice singles chronology
"Freak the Freak Out" (2010)	"Beggin' on Your Knees" (2011)	"Best Friend's Brother" (2011)

Music video
- "Beggin' on Your Knees" on YouTube

"Beggin' on Your Knees" is a song performed by the Victorious cast featuring American singer Victoria Justice from the show's debut soundtrack album, Victorious: Music from the Hit TV Show (2011). It was written by Shellback and Savan Kotecha, with production being handled by the former and Kristian Lundin. The song was released as the third single from the album on April 1, 2011, through Columbia Records in association with Nickelodeon. It later appeared in a Victorious episode of the same name, where Tori Vega (Justice) performs the song after learning her crush has been using her.

Musically, "Beggin' on Your Knees" is an upbeat pop and synth-pop track with lyrics of a girl seeking vengeance against her cheating boyfriend. The song received generally positive reviews from critics, who mostly praised its message. It peaked at number 58 on the US Billboard Hot 100 and number one on the US Kid Digital Song Sales chart. The song was certified silver in the United Kingdom by the British Phonographic Industry (BPI). An accompanying music video premiered on March 12, 2011, on Nickelodeon and portrays Justice and the Victorious cast at a carnival.

== Background ==
"Beggin' on Your Knees" was released as the third single to digital platforms from the soundtrack album Victorious: Music from the Hit TV Show on April 1, 2011, and features American singer and actress Victoria Justice. The song was later featured on the American Nickelodeon television sitcom Victorious in an episode of the same name the following day. In the episode, Tori Vega (Justice) develops a crush on her classmate Ryder Daniels (Ryan Rottman) during rehearsals for their duet for the Full Moon Jam. However, she soon learns that Ryder is only using her to get a good grade. Wanting to expose him, Tori and Andre (Leon Thomas III) write a song about his deception. Tori then exposes Ryder by performing "Beggin' on Your Knees" in front of their school during the Full Moon Jam.

== Composition and lyrics ==
The song was written by Savan Kotecha and Shellback. Shellback also produced the track and provided all the instruments and programming for it. He provided the recording for the song, which took place at Maratome Studios in Stockholm, Sweden. Kristian Lundin also recorded the song at CMK Island Studios and Westlake Studios, both in Los Angeles, California. Serban Ghenea provided the mixing for the song, which took place at MixStar Studios in Virginia Beach, Virginia with the engineering provided by John Hanes and assistance provided by Tim Roberts.

"Beggin' on Your Knees" is an upbeat pop and synth-pop track, with Israel Olorunnisola for MovieWeb stating that it has a "playful mix of seduction and empowerment". The song's lyrics are about a girl who has been cheated and betrayed by her boyfriend and expresses a desire for revenge: "You mess with me/I'll mess with her/ … So watch your back/'Cause you don't know when or where I could get you/ … I'll have you crawlin' like a centipede." In the chorus, Justice sings: "One day, you'll be begging on your knees for me."

== Reception ==
Professional ratings
Review scores
Source	Rating
Common Sense Media	3/5 stars

"Beggin' on Your Knees" was met with positive reviews from music critics. Jason Lipshutz of Billboard mentioned that the song "zip[s] along with compact hooks and unabashed attitude". Kyle Anderson of Entertainment Weekly described the track as "edgy" and "jangly". Writing for AbsolutePunk, Joe DeAndrea said the track is "unapologetically catchy as hell" and stated that it would "get stuck in your head". The joint website of Bop and Tiger Beat opined that it is the "perfect summer anthem to dance to". Jessica Dawson for Common Sense Media described the song's catchiness as "great for dancing and sleepovers" and would "probably have fans beggin' for more". Dawson opined that while "Beggin' on Your Knees" has a "playful tone", she thought the song's lyrics "might be a little harsh for younger kids".

Hannah Kerns, writing for the Elite Daily, compared the single to American singer Olivia Rodrigo's 2023 hit single "Get Him Back!", comparing its lyrics about the boyfriend "begging on your knees for me", to the lyrics of "Get Him Back!": "I wanna get him back/I wanna make him really jealous, wanna make him feel bad... I'm gonna get him so good, he won't even know what hit him." Olorunnisola placed "Beggin' on Your Knees" at number five on his "Victorious: 10 Songs You Forgot Were Awesome" list, calling it a "revenge heartbreak song". Tiara B, writing for The Shade Room, also put the song at number five on her "Victorious: The Top 10 Songs That Still Have Us Hooked" list, mentioning it "was for all the baddies fed up with triflin' guys". Sam Margolis and Rachel McQuiston of Her Campus praised the track, placing it at number four on their "5 Most Iconic Victorious Songs" list, stating that they "love" the song while dubbing it as a "feminist anthem".

=== Commercial performance ===
"Beggin' on Your Knees" debuted at number 83 on the US Billboard Hot 100 chart dated April 16, 2011. The song later peaked at number 58 on the chart, lasting four weeks and becoming Justice's second highest-charting single on the chart. The song also peaked at number one on the US Kid Digital Song Sales chart, number 19 on the US Pop Digital Song Sales chart, and number 35 on the US Digital Song Sales chart. It ranked at number two on the 2011 Kid Digital Song Sales year-end chart. In January 2025, "Beggin on Your Knees" was certified silver in the United Kingdom by the British Phonographic Industry (BPI) for selling 200,000 certified units.

== Promotion ==
A music video for "Beggin' on Your Knees" premiered on Nickelodeon on March 12, 2011, and was subsequently uploaded to the official Victorious YouTube channel on March 22. The video shows Justice and the rest of the Victorious cast at a carnival at the Santa Monica Pier hanging out, dancing, and Justice getting revenge on her ex-boyfriend. During the video shoot, it started to rain, leading to scenes of Justice and the dancers playing Skeeball machines. Dawson thought that while the music video has Justice "merely telling the 'other' girlfriend the truth", she opined that "younger kids might picture something more menacing".

To promote the song, Justice performed "Beggin' on Your Knees" live in the "Countdown to Kids' Choice" in March 2011, which premiered one hour before the 2011 Nickelodeon Kids' Choice Awards. In May 2011, teen magazine J-14 promoted the song by launching a contest that offered one winner the chance to fly to Los Angeles and meet Justice and the Victorious cast. Justice also performed "Beggin' on Your Knees" live during her 2012 tour. In 2022 and 2023, fellow Victorious actor Matt Bennett performed the song live during some of his DJ concert sets.

== Credits and personnel ==
Credits are taken from Victorious liner notes.

- Victoria Justice – vocals
- Shellback – songwriting, production, recording, programming, instrumentation
- Savan Kotecha – songwriting
- Kristian Lundin – production, recording
- Serban Ghenea – mixing
- John Hanes – engineering
- Tim Roberts – assistant engineering

== Charts ==
=== Weekly charts ===
Chart (2011)	Peak position
US Billboard Hot 100	58
US Kid Digital Song Sales (Billboard)	1
US Pop Digital Song Sales (Billboard)	19

=== Year-end charts ===
Chart (2011)	Position
US Kid Digital Song Sales (Billboard)	2

== Certifications ==
Certifications and sales
Region	Certification	Certified units/sales
United Kingdom (BPI)	Silver	200,000^{‡}
United States	—	28,000
^{‡} Sales+streaming figures based on certification alone.
