= Song 2 You =

Song by Victorious cast featuring Leon Thomas III and Victoria Justice

from the album Victorious: Music from the Hit TV Show
- Released: August 2, 2011
- Length: 3:38
- Label: Nickelodeon; Columbia
- Songwriters: Leon Thomas III; Brian Kierulf; Josh Schwartz
- Producers: Brian Kierulf; Josh Schwartz; Michael Corcoran

"Song 2 You" is a song by the Victorious cast featuring American singers Leon Thomas III and Victoria Justice. The song first appeared in a Victorious episode titled "The Diddly-Bops" which aired on January 17, 2011. The track was then officially released on Victorious: Music from the Hit TV Show, the show's debut soundtrack album on August 2, 2011.

The song was written by Thomas himself, Brian Kierulf, and Josh Schwartz, the latter two producing the track alongside Backhouse Mike. The track is about love being more important than material possessions. Upon its release, "Song 2 You" was positively received by music critics. Commercially, it peaked at number eight on the US Billboard Kid Digital Song Sales chart.

== Release ==
"Song 2 You" was first featured on the Nickelodeon television sitcom Victorious in an episode titled "The Diddly-Bops" which aired on January 17, 2011. In the episode, Tori (Victoria Justice) and her friends are asked by their teacher Sikowitz (Eric Lange) to sing at a children's birthday party as last minute replacements. Andre (Leon Thomas III) is close to landing a record deal, but his chances are threatened when a video of him performing at the birthday party is leaked online. Andre has to convince the producer of the record label that he can be taken seriously as an artist. The song was officially released as the ninth track on the show's debut soundtrack album Victorious: Music from the Hit TV Show on August 2, 2011.

== Music and lyrics ==
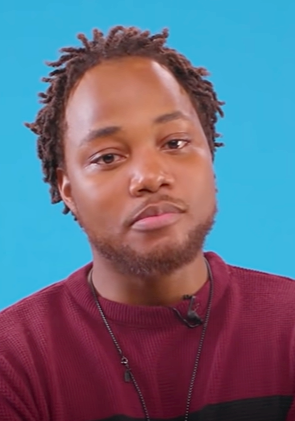
The track features Leon Thomas III (pictured in 2020) on lead vocals.

The track features lead vocals and guitar by Thomas, with background vocals provided by Justice. The track was written by Thomas, Brian Kierulf, and Josh Schwartz. Kierulf also contributed as a producer, programmer, engineer, and recording engineer, alongside Schwartz. Michael Corcoran served as an additional producer and recording engineer. The song was mixed by Greg Wells and mastered by Brian Gardner. In an interview with Newsday in July 2011, Thomas revealed that he wrote "Song 2 You" when he was 14 years old. He explained that it was "really a blessing" for the song to appear on Victorious.

Writing for AllMusic, William Ruhlmann expressed that "Song 2 You" has lyrical themes that "tend toward light romance, happy and sad, and assertions of self-worth". Jessica Dawson, writing for Common Sense Media, stated that the song is "about being yourself, not caring about material things, and opening up to someone you love". Bob Hoose and Steven Isaac for Plugged In said that the track "lifts up the promise of true love by offering a personalized love song", highlighting the lines: "I don't have the world, can't give it to you, girl/But all that I can do is give this song to you."

== Reception ==
"Song 2 You" was met with mainly positive reviews from music critics. Hoose and Isaac expressed that the song has "Maroon 5-sounding stops". Robyn Ross of TV Guide opined that Justice "has shown off her singing skills" on the track, while saying that Thomas "is proving he's got talent as well". Liam Crowley of ComicBook.com declared that the track is one of the "biggest hits from the Victorious soundtrack". Kayla Chanthavisith, writing for Her Campus, described the track as "underrated". For AbsolutePunk, Joe DeAndrea commented that the track reveals "the intricacy of how fun the show really is".

Tiara B. of The Shade Room ranked the song fourth on her list titled "Victorious: The Top 10 Songs That Still Have Us Hooked", describing it as a "beautiful" track and one of the show's "most iconic duets". She also noted its lasting appeal, stating that the A cappella version "eats every single time". Writing for MovieWeb, Israel Olorunnisola put the song at number two on his "Victorious: 10 Songs You Forgot Were Awesome" list, remarking that Thomas gave a "wonderful performance" during the episode. Commercially, "Song 2 You" charted at number eight on the Billboard Kid Digital Song Sales chart in the United States.

== Credits and personnel ==
Credits adapted from Tidal.

- Leon Thomas III – vocals, writer, guitar
- Victoria Justice – background vocals
- Brian Kierulf – writer, producer, engineer, programming, recording engineer
- Josh Schwartz – producer, writer
- Michael Corcoran – producer, recording engineer
- Greg Wells – mixing engineer
- Brian Gardner – mastering engineer

== Charts ==
Chart (2011)	Peak position
US Kid Digital Song Sales (Billboard)	8
