= Finally Falling =

Song by Victorious cast featuring Victoria Justice

from the album Victorious: Music from the Hit TV Show
- Released: August 2, 2011
- Genre: Pop rock
- Length: 3:38
- Label: Nickelodeon; Columbia
- Songwriters: Michael Corcoran; CJ Abraham; Dan Schneider; Drake Bell
- Producers: Backhouse Mike; The Super Chris

"Finally Falling" is a song by the Victorious cast featuring American actress and singer Victoria Justice. The song appeared in a Victorious episode titled "Tori the Zombie". The track was officially released on Victorious: Music from the Hit TV Show, the show's debut soundtrack album on August 2, 2011. The song was written by Michael Corcoran, CJ Abraham, Dan Schneider, and Drake Bell. "Finally Falling" is an upbeat pop rock ballad with lyrics about two people building trust and falling in love. It was met with positive reviews from music critics. "Finally Falling" peaked at number ten on the US Billboard Kid Digital Song Sales chart.

== Release ==
"Finally Falling" appeared in the Nickelodeon television sitcom Victorious during an episode titled "Tori the Zombie". In the episode, Tori (Victoria Justice) is expected to perform "Finally Falling". A zombie face mask gets stuck to her face after Cat (Ariana Grande) glues it on her, compromising her ability to perform the track. In the end of the episode, Tori ends up performing the song with Beck (Avan Jogia). The song was officially released as the eleventh track on the show's debut soundtrack album Victorious: Music from the Hit TV Show on August 2, 2011.

== Music and lyrics ==
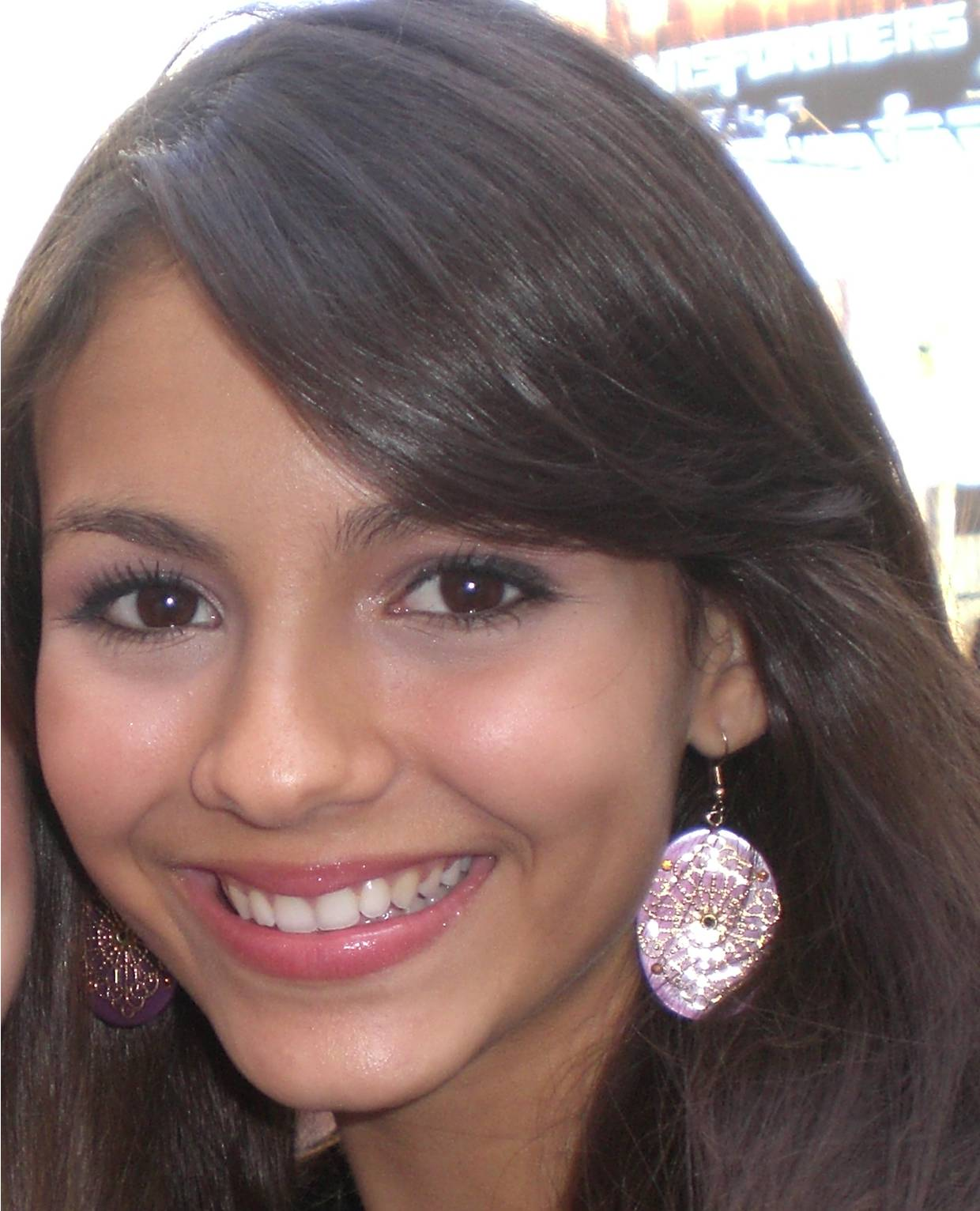
The song features Justice (pictured in 2007) on vocals.

"Finally Falling" features vocals from Justice, with background vocals provided by Jogia, Elizabeth Gillies, and Niki Watkins. Michael Corcoran contributed background vocals and served as a writer, producer, and engineer on the track. CJ Abraham co-wrote and co-produced the song, in addition to providing background vocals and playing keyboards. Additional songwriting credits include Drake Bell and Victorious creator Dan Schneider. "Finally Falling" was mixed by Greg Wells and mastered by Brian Gardner.

Musically, music critics have described "Finally Falling" as an upbeat pop rock ballad. The song is about two people building trust and finding out that they have feelings for each other as their relationship grows. Bob Hoose and Steven Isaac for Plugged In wrote that the lyrics for "Finally Falling" are about how "love trumps material things", highlighting the lyrics "True love doesn't cost a thing/Don't try to buy it, you can't return it."

== Reception ==
"Finally Falling" was added by Hoose and Isaac to their "Pro-Social Content" section of their review of the album, giving the track positive reception. Emma Lichtenstein from Study Breaks Magazine described "Finally Falling" as "one of the best songs in the show", calling it "incredibly upbeat". Megan Gaertner and Allison Kane for Her Campus placed the song at number eight on their "The Best Songs from Victorious" list, stating that they had "completely forgotten" about the song, adding that as children they "probably found this song kind of boring". They later labeled it as "really sweet and romantic", opining that they "don't believe there are many songs like it on the soundtrack, which makes this song even more special". Writing for MovieWeb, Israel Olorunnisola put the song at third place on his "Victorious: 10 Songs You Forgot Were Awesome" list, declaring that "Finally Falling" is "one of Victorious's best musical moments". Commercially, "Finally Falling" charted at number ten on the Billboard Kid Digital Song Sales chart in the United States.

== Credits and personnel ==
Credits adapted from Tidal.

- Victoria Justice – vocals
- Avan Jogia – background vocals
- Elizabeth Gillies – background vocals
- Niki Watkins – background vocals
- Michael Corcoran – background vocals, writer, producer, engineer
- CJ Abraham – background vocals, writer, producer, keyboards
- Drake Bell – writer
- Dan Schneider – writer
- Greg Wells – mixing engineer
- Brian Gardner – mastering engineer

== Charts ==
| Chart (2011) | Peak position |
|---|---|
| US Kid Digital Song Sales (Billboard) | 10 |
