= Victorious: Music from the Hit TV Show =

2011 soundtrack album

Soundtrack album by Victorious cast featuring Victoria Justice
- Released: August 2, 2011
- Genres: Pop; teen pop
- Length: 36:52
- Labels: Nickelodeon; Columbia
- Producers: Backhouse Mike; Toby Gad; Brian Kierulf; Kool Kojak; Dr. Luke; Kristian Lundin; Raphael Saadiq; Josh Schwartz; Shellback; the Super Chris; Greg Wells

Victorious cast and Victoria Justice chronology
Victorious: Music from the Hit TV Show (2011)	Victorious 2.0: More Music from the Hit TV Show (2012)

Singles from Victorious
- 1. "Make It Shine" Released: April 13, 2010; 2. "Freak the Freak Out" Released: November 22, 2010; 3. "Beggin' on Your Knees" Released: April 1, 2011; 4. "Best Friend's Brother" Released: May 20, 2011; 5. "Leave It All to Shine" Released: June 10, 2011; 6. "You're the Reason" Released: December 3, 2011

Victorious: Music from the Hit TV Show is the debut soundtrack album for the Nickelodeon television series Victorious. It was released on August 2, 2011, by Columbia and Nickelodeon Records. Most of the album was sung by the lead actress of the television series, Victoria Justice. The other singers featured on the album include Ariana Grande, Elizabeth Gillies, Leon Thomas III, Miranda Cosgrove, and Matt Bennett. It is a pop and teen pop album that includes songs with lyrical themes about love, friendship, and self-worth. Critical commentary for the album was generally mixed, with praise towards its vocals and commercial appeal, but received criticism as unoriginal and overly polished.

Victorious: Music from the Hit TV Show was supported by six singles. "Freak the Freak Out", "Beggin' on Your Knees", and "Best Friend's Brother" all charted on the US Billboard Hot 100 chart, while "Make It Shine", "Leave It All to Shine", and "You're the Reason" appeared on the US Billboard Bubbling Under Hot 100 chart. It debuted on the US Billboard 200 albums chart at number five with 41,000 copies sold. It also peaked at number one on the US Billboard Kid Albums and Soundtracks Albums charts. Outside of the United States, the album charted in Austria, Spain, Switzerland, Germany, Ireland, and the United Kingdom.

== Background and release ==
In an April 2010 interview with ClevverTV, Victorious actress Victoria Justice stated that she had been recording music for the show's soundtrack and confirmed that it would be released following the conclusion of the first season of Victorious. In an interview with Teen Vogue in August 2011, Justice explained that the Victorious cast hardly ever recorded together in the studio when working on the soundtrack. Each member would go in individually to record their parts when they weren't filming. If they didn't have time, they would record during the weekend. Justice stated that she and the cast were proud of the soundtrack. Victorious: Music from the Hit TV Show was officially released for digital download and streaming by Columbia Records and Nickelodeon Records on August 2, 2011.

== Music structure and lyrics ==
Victorious: Music from the Hit TV Show is primarily a pop and teen pop record. It features the heavy usage of synthesizers, drum machine and Auto-Tune. The album's lyrical themes explore topics about love, friendship, breakups, fame, and the affirmation of self-worth. The album opens with "Make It Shine", the theme song for Victorious which features Justice on vocals. Musically, the track is a pop, teen pop, candy pop, and pop rock song. The lyrics are about encouraging people to follow after their dreams. "Freak the Freak Out" is an upbeat rock-influenced pop, teen pop, funk, and dance song that is about Justice fighting with her unresponsive boyfriend.

"Best Friend's Brother" is an upbeat and uptempo pop and synth-pop song. It features Justice having a crush over her friend's older brother. "Beggin' on Your Knees" is an upbeat pop and synth-pop track that has Justice wanting to get revenge on her cheating ex-boyfriend. "All I Want Is Everything", featuring Justice on vocals, is an upbeat track that references musicians Madonna and Michael Jackson, and has lyrics about a girl going after her crush and wanting to achieve fame. "You're the Reason" is an uptempo pop and electro ballad with Justice on vocals. The song's lyrics center on a strange but supportive person who helps their friend gain greater self-confidence. "Give It Up", which features Ariana Grande and Elizabeth Gillies on vocals, is a pop, teen pop, and R&B song. Its lyrics are about Gillies and Grande inviting a boy to approach them.

The next track is a bubblegum pop cover version of the Jackson 5's 1969 hit single "I Want You Back" which features Justice on vocals. "Song 2 You" features Justice and Leon Thomas III singing about falling in love and finding that it doesn't depend on material possessions like designer clothes. "Tell Me That You Love Me" also features Justice and Thomas on vocals. The lyrics are about a couple continuing to be in love despite all the tough times they have together. "Finally Falling" is a pop rock ballad that has Justice singing about her and her boyfriend choosing love over material possessions. The album ends with "Leave It All to Shine", a pop and teen pop track that is a mashup of the theme songs from Victorious ("Make It Shine") and iCarly ("Leave It All to Me"), featuring vocals from Justice and Miranda Cosgrove. The iTunes version of the album concludes with "Broken Glass" that has Matt Bennett on vocals.

== Promotion ==
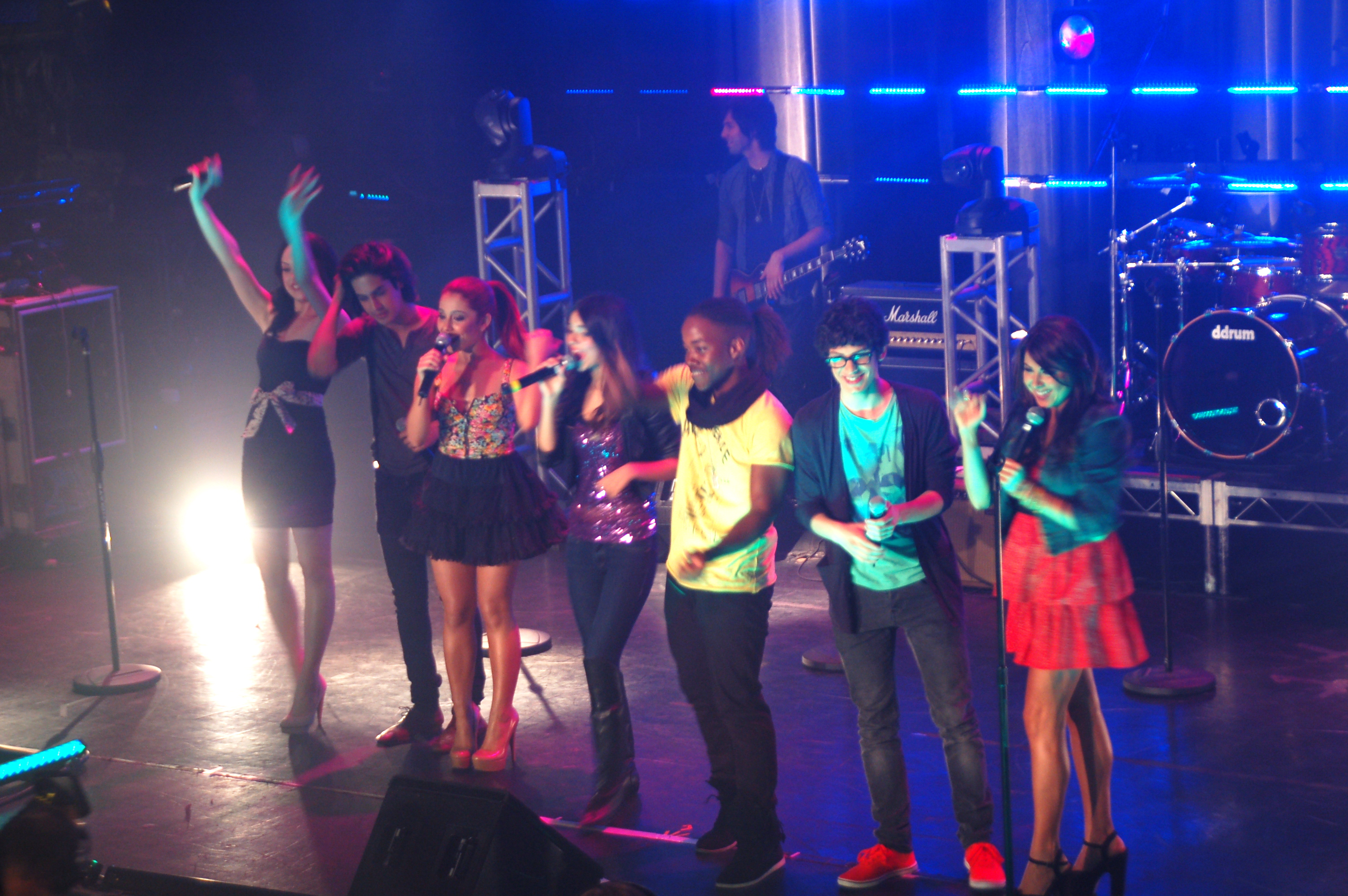
The Victorious cast performing at Avalon Hollywood in Hollywood, California on May 26, 2011.

Nickelodeon partnered with Walmart to promote a concert for Victorious, and a one night only concert was held on May 26, 2011, at Avalon Hollywood in Hollywood, California. It featured Justice and the Victorious cast performing various songs from the show to promote the soundtrack. Nickelodeon would later partner again with Walmart to promote the concert and soundtrack, with Victorious related merchandise being sold exclusively in Walmart stores from July to September 2011 throughout the United States and Canada. Walmart Soundcheck had financed and filmed the concert, and they would later air the whole concert on the Walmart Soundcheck website and Walmart stores on August 6, 2011.

=== Singles ===
"Make It Shine" was released as the lead single on April 13, 2010. It peaked at number 16 on the US Billboard Bubbling Under Hot 100 chart. "Freak the Freak Out" was released as the second single from the soundtrack on November 22, 2010. The song received a music video which was released in November 2010, and features Justice and the Victorious cast dancing with other people. The song peaked at number 50 on the US Billboard Hot 100 and number 176 on the UK Singles Chart. "Beggin' on Your Knees" was released as the third single on April 1, 2011. A music video was released on March 12, 2011, and features Justice and the Victorious cast hanging out at a carnival. The song peaked at number 58 on the Billboard Hot 100.

"Best Friend's Brother" was issued as the fourth single from the album on May 20, 2011. A music video was released in May 2011 and features Justice dreaming about her friend's older brother. It peaked at number 86 on the Billboard Hot 100. "Leave It All to Shine" was released on June 10, 2011, as the fifth single. The song debuted and peaked at number 24 on the US Bubbling Under Hot 100 chart. "You're the Reason" was released as the sixth and final single on December 3, 2011. An acoustic rendition of the song was released on the same day as the single's release. A music video for the acoustic version of "You're the Reason" was released in December 2011. It features Justice playing the piano on a beach. The song peaked at number 24 on the Bubbling Under Hot 100 chart.

=== Other songs ===
"I Want You Back" and "Give It Up" also charted on the Bubbling Under Hot 100 chart, with "I Want You Back" peaking at number eight and "Give It Up" reaching number 23. A music video for "I Want You Back" was released in July 2011 and features behind the scenes clips of a Victorious special. A music video for "All I Want Is Everything" was released in September 2011 and features Justice attempting to impress her crush, ending in a cliffhanger. A flash mob music video for "All I Want Is Everything" was released later that same month, serving as the conclusion to the cliffhanger. It shows Justice and her crush getting together.

== Reception ==
Professional ratings
Review scores
Source	Rating
AbsolutePunk	72%
AllMusic	3/5 stars
Common Sense Media	3/5 stars
Entertainment Weekly	B−

Victorious: Music from the Hit TV Show was met with generally mixed reviews from music critics. The joint website of Bop and Tiger Beat described Victorious as "such a fun TV show", stating that "the soundtrack does it justice". They declared that the "songs on this album are so catchy", opining that "they will almost definitely get stuck in your head for hours". Maggie of Twist magazine praised the album, stating "we're super stoked to hear it". For Her Campus, Kayla Chanthavisith labeled the album as an "absolute masterpiece", while Casey Epstein-Gross of Paste called it an "astonishing piece of work". Catie Curry for Girls' Life described the tracks on the album as "awesome", mentioning that it is "perfect to whip out when you are hanging with your friends or in the mood to dance and sing". Bob Hoose and Steven Isaac for Plugged In stated that the album has a "collection of ditties" that have "well-rehearsed, clean-sounding vocals, backdropped by catchy tunes". They thought that the songs in the album sounded like a "well-produced derivatives of other songs you may have heard resting at the top of the charts lately".

Joe DeAndrea of AbsolutePunk gave the album a 72 percent rating, asserted the songs in it "aren't even all that bad", expressing that they "aren't all that worse than what is currently on the radio". He commented that the songs featuring Justice "could work perfectly as Katy Perry or Pink material", adding that the tracks could "easily hit the Hot 100" and be a "staple of your summer". He suggested that listeners approach the album as "a piece of nostalgia", describing the songs as a "little reminder of the shows you once loved" and comparing it to "the '90s all over again". Jessica Dawson for Common Sense Media gave the album three stars out of five, opining that while the "overall content and lyrics are clean, the songs are best for older kids or fans of the show". She remarked that "although the lyrics and music on the Victorious soundtrack are typical tween pop fluff, Justice's vocals are mature and expressive". In a more negative review, AllMusic's William Ruhlmann rated the album three stars out of five, saying that "what really matters is what Justice and her earnest fellow cast members look like, not what they sound like, especially given the cookie-cutter nature of this music". Kyle Anderson for Entertainment Weekly gave the album a B− rating. He remarked that Justice and the Victorious cast "dress-up with a closetful of song and personality styles, but never find the right fit". Anderson noted that Justice is "best as the prom queen scorned", but felt she "otherwise gets lost in a mirror maze of impeccably dull tween popcraft".

=== Commercial performance ===
Victorious: Music from the Hit TV Show debuted and peaked at number five on the US Billboard 200 with 41,000 copies sold. The album peaked at number five on the US Digital Albums chart and US Top Current Album Sales chart. It also charted at number one on the US Kid Albums chart and US Soundtrack Albums chart. Outside the United States, the album peaked at number 35 in Austria, number 36 in Spain, number 69 in Switzerland, and number 100 in Germany. It further charted at number 66 on the UK Album Downloads chart, number 13 on the UK Soundtrack Albums chart, and number ten on the UK Compilation Albums chart. Victorious: Music from the Hit TV Show was certified gold in the United Kingdom by the British Phonographic Industry (BPI) for selling 100,000 units. In 2026, the soundtrack peaked at number 16 on the Irish Compilations chart in Ireland.

== Track listing ==
Standard edition
No.	Title	Writer(s)	Artist(s)	Length
1.	"Make It Shine" (Victorious Theme)	Lukasz Gottwald; Michael Corcoran; Dan Schneider	Victorious cast featuring Victoria Justice	3:07
2.	"Freak the Freak Out"	CJ Abraham; Corcoran; Schneider; Nick Hexum; Zack Hexum	Victorious cast featuring Victoria Justice	3:54
3.	"Best Friend's Brother"	Allan Grigg; Savan Kotecha; Victoria Justice	Victorious cast featuring Victoria Justice	3:38
4.	"Beggin' on Your Knees"	Shellback; Kotecha	Victorious cast featuring Victoria Justice	3:13
5.	"All I Want Is Everything"	Lindy Robbins; Toby Gad	Victorious cast featuring Victoria Justice	3:02
6.	"You're the Reason"	Corcoran; Abraham; Schneider	Victorious cast featuring Victoria Justice	2:53
7.	"Give It Up"	Corcoran; Abraham; Schneider	Victorious cast featuring Elizabeth Gillies and Ariana Grande	2:45
8.	"I Want You Back"	The Corporation	Victorious cast featuring Victoria Justice	2:59
9.	"Song 2 You"	Josh Schwartz; Brian Kierulf; Leon Thomas III	Victorious cast featuring Leon Thomas III and Victoria Justice	3:38
10.	"Tell Me That You Love Me"	Corcoran; Abraham; Schneider	Victorious cast featuring Victoria Justice and Leon Thomas III	2:41
11.	"Finally Falling"	Corcoran; Abraham; Schneider; Drake Bell	Victorious cast featuring Victoria Justice	2:50
12.	"Leave It All to Shine"	Gottwald; Corcoran; Schneider	iCarly and Victorious casts featuring Miranda Cosgrove and Victoria Justice	2:12
Total length:				36:52

iTunes Store
No.	Title	Writer(s)	Artist(s)	Length
13.	"Broken Glass"	Schneider	Victorious cast featuring Matt Bennett	2:25
Total length:				39:17

== Charts ==
=== Weekly charts ===
Weekly chart performance for Victorious: Music from the Hit TV Show
Chart (2011–2012)	Peak position
Austrian Albums (Ö3 Austria)	35
German Albums (Offizielle Top 100)	100
Spanish Albums (Promusicae)	36
Swiss Albums (Schweizer Hitparade)	69
UK Album Downloads (OCC)	66
UK Compilation Albums (Official Charts)	10
UK Soundtrack Albums (OCC)	13
US Billboard 200	5
US Kid Albums (Billboard)	1
US Soundtrack Albums (Billboard)	1

Chart (2026)	Peak position
Irish Compilations (IRMA)	16

=== Year-end charts ===
2011 year-end chart performance for Victorious: Music from the Hit TV Show
Chart (2011)	Position
US Kid Albums (Billboard)	9
US Soundtrack Albums (Billboard)	16
US Top Current Albums Sales (Billboard)	196

2012 year-end chart performance for Victorious: Music from the Hit TV Show
Chart (2012)	Position
US Kid Albums (Billboard)	10
US Soundtrack Albums (Billboard)	23

== Certifications and sales ==
Certifications and sales for Victorious: Music from the Hit TV Show
Region	Certification	Certified units/sales
United Kingdom (BPI)	Gold	100,000^{‡}
United States	—	41,000
^{‡} Sales+streaming figures based on certification alone.
