= Freak the Freak Out =

2010 single by Victorious cast

Single by Victorious cast featuring Victoria Justice

from the album Victorious: Music from the Hit TV Show
- Released: November 22, 2010
- Studio: The Backhouse (Los Angeles, California); Rocket Carousel (Los Angeles, California)
- Genre: Pop; teen pop; funk; dance
- Length: 3:54
- Label: Nickelodeon; Columbia
- Songwriters: CJ Abraham; Michael Corcoran; Dan Schneider; Nick Hexum; Zack Hexum
- Producers: Backhouse Mike; The Super Chris

Victorious singles chronology
"Make It Shine" (2010)	"Freak the Freak Out" (2010)	"Beggin' on Your Knees" (2011)

Victoria Justice singles chronology
"Make It Shine" (2010)	"Freak the Freak Out" (2010)	"Beggin' on Your Knees" (2011)

Music video
- "Freak the Freak Out" on YouTube

"Freak the Freak Out" is a song performed by the Victorious cast featuring the American singer Victoria Justice from the show's soundtrack album, Victorious: Music from the Hit TV Show (2011). It was produced by the Super Chris and Michael Corcoran, who also co-wrote the song with Nick Hexum, Zack Hexum, and Dan Schneider. It was released as the second single from the show's album to digital platforms on November 22, 2010, through Columbia Records and Nickelodeon. Musically, it is an upbeat rock-influenced pop, teen pop, funk, and dance track with lyrics about fighting with a boyfriend. A Victorious episode of the same name premiered on November 26, 2010, and features Tori Vega (Justice), Jade West (Elizabeth Gillies), and Cat Valentine (Ariana Grande) trying to expose a rigged karaoke competition. Tori performs the song while dressed in a disguise.

The song was met with generally positive reviews from critics, with the majority praising its catchiness. "Freak the Freak Out" peaked at number 50 on the US Billboard Hot 100 and number 176 on the UK Singles Chart. The song also charted on secondary and digital charts in the United States and Australia. It was certified gold by the Recording Industry Association of America (RIAA). An accompanying music video was released in November 2010, and was later added to the official Victorious YouTube channel on September 20, 2012. The visual portrays Justice and the Victorious cast dancing against other people. Justice performed the song live at the 2010 Macy's Thanksgiving Day Parade and during her 2012 and 2013 tours.

== Background and release ==
"Freak the Freak Out" was released as the second single to digital platforms from the soundtrack album Victorious: Music from the Hit TV Show (2011) on November 22, 2010. It was later featured in the one-hour special of the same name on the American television sitcom Victorious, which aired on November 26, 2010. In the episode, Tori Vega (Victoria Justice) and her friends are thrilled to try out Karaoke Dokie, a fictional karaoke club that has weekly singing contests.

On the night of a competition, Jade West (Elizabeth Gillies) and Cat Valentine (Ariana Grande) team up to perform, but the club's owner tampers the competition so his daughter and her friend can win. Jade and Cat seek out Tori for her help to get revenge. Jade and Cat challenge the two girls to a bet, claiming that anyone could sing better than both of them. The girls inadvertently choose Tori, who disguised herself as a homeless person by wearing a hat, wig, wart, and prosthetic nose. She appears on stage to sing "Freak the Freak Out" while she removes her disguise to reveal herself.

== Music and lyrics ==
The song was written by Michael Corcoran, also known as Backhouse Mike, C.J. Abraham, Nick Hexum, Zack Hexum, Dan Schneider. It also featured additional production by Greg Wells. The mixing for the song was provided by Greg Wellstook place at Rocket Carousel in Los Angeles, California. Corcoran and the Super Chris produced the track and provided all the song's instruments. Corcoran also provided the guitars. Corcoran was also included on the programming for the song with CJ Abraham, both of which engineered the track in the Backhouse in Los Angeles. Corcoran and Abraham provided additional vocals along with Niki Watkins, Nick and Zack Hexum.

"Freak the Freak Out" is an upbeat rock-influenced pop, teen pop, funk, and dance track. The song's lyrics showcase a girl who is having trouble with her unresponsive partner while also encouraging people to value their distinctive qualities and stay loyal to themselves: "I'm so sick of it/Your attention deficit/Never listen, you never listen/I'm so sick of it/So I'll throw another fit." Bob Hoose and Steven Isaac for Plugged In opined that the "second 'freak' in the title is a not-so-subtle substitute for an intended obscenity". William Ruhlmann for AllMusic wrote that the track has "relentless beats, synthesized instrumentations, nonstop simple, repetitive choruses, and Auto-Tune vocals". Jason Lipshutz, writing for Billboard, said the song finds Justice "having a blast with the G-rated concept and flashing an undeniable amount of charisma on a Nickelodeon soundtrack song".

== Critical reception ==
"Freak the Freak Out" was met with mainly positive reviews from music critics. Lipshutz opined the song "deserves to be re-discovered as a highly campy, totally transfixing single". Hoose and Isaac called it a "Katy Perry sound-alike". Evelina Zaragoza Medina for BuzzFeed praised Justice's performance of the song in Victorious, calling it one of the "most iconic scenes in the show". The staff of Tiger Beat stated the track "has such a catchy and fun beat", mentioning that it is "definitely something we need to get on our mp3 players ASAP". Alyssa Melillo for the Long Island Press declared that the song "set an energetic high bar for the show". Brandy McDonnell of The Oklahoman labeled "Freak the Freak Out" as an "infectious song". Bruce Miller from the Sioux City Journal described the track as "bouncy" and dubbed it as a "girl-power anthem".

For AbsolutePunk, Joe DeAndrea said the track is "unapologetically catchy as hell" and stated that it would "get stuck in your head". Casey Epstein-Gross of Paste called it a "legitimate banger that earworms itself into your skull". Jacquez Printup for Yardbarker placed "Freak the Freak Out" at number fourteen on his "20 original songs from fictional shows and movies that are actually fire" list, stating that it has a "catchy chorus". Writing for MovieWeb, Israel Olorunnisola put the song at number six on his "Victorious: 10 Songs You Forgot Were Awesome" list, describing it as "energetic". Megan Gaertner and Allison Kane for Her Campus placed the song at number four on their "The Best Songs from Victorious" list, saying the song "is another great bop", and that it "was and still is a great one to jam out to with your besties". Tiara B, writing for The Shade Room, put the song at number three on her "Victorious: The Top 10 Songs That Still Have Us Hooked" list, labeling it as a "bop", and opining that it was an "anthem for never judging a book by a cover".

== Commercial performance ==
"Freak the Freak Out" debuted at number 78 on the US Billboard Hot 100 chart dated December 18, 2010. The song later peaked at number 50 in January 2011, lasting six weeks on the chart and giving Justice her highest charting track on the Hot 100. It also peaked at number one on the US Heatseekers Songs chart, number six on the US Kid Digital Song Sales chart, number 21 on the US Pop Digital Song Sales chart, and number 41 on the US Digital Song Sales chart.

The Recording Industry Association of America (RIAA) certified the single a gold certification for selling over 600,000 units based on sales and track-equivalent on-demand streams in the United States. Outside of the United States, the song peaked at number 176 in the United Kingdom on the UK Singles Chart in March 2011. "Freak the Freak Out" charted in secondary charts in Australia, debuting and peaking at number seven on the Australia Hitseekers chart in May 2011.

== Promotion ==
A music video for "Freak the Freak Out" was first released in November 2010 on Nickelodeon. It was later uploaded to the official Victorious YouTube channel on September 20, 2012. It was the first music video to be made for a Victorious song. The visual features Justice and the Victorious cast doing a dance-off with other people at a warehouse. In January 2011, Justice announced a contest on her YouTube channel, encouraging her fans to post videos of themselves dancing, singing, or performing to "Freak the Freak Out". She announced the winner would get to meet her in Los Angeles on the set of her new music video in March 2011.

Justice performed "Freak the Freak Out" live at the 2010 Macy's Thanksgiving Day Parade. She also performed the song live during her 2012 and 2013 tours. In January 2020, fellow Victorious castmates Grande and Matt Bennett posted a clip of themselves singing "Freak the Freak Out" on social media while staying at Disneyland. During 2022 and 2023, Bennett performed the song live during some of his DJ concert sets.

== Credits and personnel ==
Credits are taken from Victorious liner notes.

- Victoria Justice – vocals
- Michael Corcoran - songwriting, production, instrumentation, guitars, programming, engineering, background vocals
- C.J. Abraham - production, instrumentation, songwriting, programming, engineering, background vocals
- Nick Hexum - songwriting, background vocals
- Zack Hexum - songwriting, background vocals
- Dan Schneider - songwriting
- Niki Watkins - background vocals
- Greg Wells - additional production, mixing

== Charts ==
Chart (2010–2011)	Peak position
Australia Hitseekers (ARIA)	7
UK Singles (Official Charts)	176
US Billboard Hot 100	50
US Heatseekers Songs (Billboard)	1
US Kid Digital Song Sales (Billboard)	6
US Pop Digital Song Sales (Billboard)	21

== Certifications ==
Certifications and sales
Region	Certification	Certified units/sales
United States (RIAA)	Gold	600,000
^{*} Sales figures based on certification alone.^{^} Shipments figures based on certification alone.
