= Give It Up (Victorious song) =

Song by Victorious cast featuring Elizabeth Gillies and Ariana Grande

from the album Victorious: Music from the Hit TV Show
- Released: August 2, 2011
- Genre: Pop; teen pop; R&B
- Length: 2:45
- Label: Nickelodeon; Columbia
- Songwriters: Michael Corcoran; CJ Abraham; Dan Schneider
- Producers: Backhouse Mike; The Super Chris

"Give It Up" is a song by the Victorious cast featuring American actresses and singers Elizabeth Gillies and Ariana Grande. The song first appeared on a one-hour Victorious special titled "Freak the Freak Out" on November 26, 2010, and was sung by Gillies and Grande. The track was then officially released on Victorious: Music from the Hit TV Show, the show's debut soundtrack album on August 2, 2011.

The track is a pop, teen pop, and R&B track with lyrics about a girl telling a boy to approach her. "Give It Up" received mostly positive reviews from music critics, with some praising Gillies's and Grande's vocals. The song peaked at number 23 on the US Billboard Bubbling Under Hot 100 chart and number three on the US Kid Digital Song Sales chart. Grande performed the song live with Gillies during her Sweetener World Tour in November 2019. Victorious costar Matt Bennett performed it live in 2022 and 2023.

== Background and release ==
"Give It Up" first appeared on the Nickelodeon television sitcom Victorious in a one-hour special titled "Freak the Freak Out" on November 26, 2010. The episode features Tori Vega (Victoria Justice) and her friends attending a weekly singing competition at Karaoke Dokie, a fictional karaoke bar. Two of Tori's friends, Jade West (Elizabeth Gillies) and Cat Valentine (Ariana Grande), enter a singing competition and perform "Give It Up" together. The song was officially released as the seventh track on the show's debut soundtrack album Victorious: Music from the Hit TV Show on August 2, 2011, marking the musical debut for both Gillies and Grande.

== Writing and lyrics ==
Grande and Gillies provide the lead vocals on the track, with Dena Chutnik contributing background vocals. The song was written by the show's producer Dan Schneider, Michael Corcoran, and CJ Abraham. Corcoran served as a producer, engineer, and associated performer, while Abraham also contributed as a producer and added keyboards. The track was mastered by Brian Gardner and mixed by Greg Wells. "Give It Up" has been described as a pop, teen pop, and R&B track.

Bob Hoose and Steven Isaac for Plugged In stated that the track "puts the physically aggressive high heel on the other foot as the female singers push a boy to 'come a little closer', highlighting the lyrics: "At the end of the night/It's the same old story/But you never get it right/Give it up ... Take a backseat, boy/'Cause now I'm driving." Zahraa Schroeder, writing for Smile 90.4FM, stated that the song has "low notes at the start", and that Grande's section "gets all the crazy high notes".

== Reception ==
"Give It Up" was met with positive reviews from music critics. Jack Irvin of People magazine called the track "memorable", while Marcus Jones of Entertainment Weekly labeled it as an "iconic karaoke number". Jacquez Printup for Yardbarker stated that the "Give It Up" would "always be [number one] in my eyes" when talking about tracks featured on Victorious. Kristen S. Hé and Andrew Unterberger, writing for Billboard magazine, put the track at number 123 on their "Every Ariana Grande Song, Ranked: Critic's Picks" list, opining that the track "aged surprisingly well" while describing it as a "banger". They noted that Grande's vocals on "Give It Up" have a "deeper, brassier tone" compared to her other tracks while describing Gillies as "the star" of the song.

Catie Curry for Girls' Life stated the song was her "fave", and called it a "fun song". Curry commented that "you'll totally want to turn it up when your BFFs stop by on a Saturday night". Casey Epstein-Gross of Paste stated it "remains an all-time pop number to this day". Writing for Her Campus, Megan Gaertner and Allison Kane placed the song at number seven on their "The Best Songs from Victorious" list, describing the track as a "great song" and "girl-power anthem" that has "powerful vocals". Elizabeth Karpen from the same magazine stated that the track "might be the greatest song to come out of the Schneiderverse", mentioning that "it’s a bop that holds up today". Justin Curto of Vulture compared the track to the works of Christina Aguilera, while Hoose and Isaac compared the song to "Lady Marmalade" which was written by Bob Crewe and Kenny Nolan. William Ruhlmann of AllMusic expressed his dislike of the song, calling it a "Britney Spears reject".

=== Commercial performance ===
"Give It Up" debuted and peaked at number three on the US Kid Digital Song Sales chart, giving Grande her first hit on any Billboard chart. In August 2011, "Give It Up" also debuted and peaked at number 23 on the US Billboard Bubbling Under Hot 100 chart, lasting one week on the chart.

== Live performances ==
On November 19, 2019, Grande resumed her Sweetener World Tour and posted on her Twitter account about working on a special project, saying, "Guys I can't tell u why yet, but I'm so excited for tonight. I've never felt this way. Goodbye." Later that night, at a concert in Atlanta, Georgia, Grande surprised her fans by having Gillies walk on stage to perform "Give It Up" with her. Jack Irvin of People described it as a "nostalgic rendition". During 2022 and 2023, fellow Victorious cast mate Matt Bennett performed the song live during some of his DJ concert sets.

== Credits and personnel ==
Credits adapted from Tidal.

- Ariana Grande – vocals
- Elizabeth Gillies – vocals
- Dena Chutnik – background vocals
- Dan Schneider – writer
- Michael Corcoran – writer, producer, engineer, associated performer
- CJ Abraham – writer, producer, keyboards
- Brian Gardner – mastering engineer
- Greg Wells – mixing engineer

== Charts ==
Chart (2011)	Peak position
US Bubbling Under Hot 100 (Billboard)	23
US Kid Digital Song Sales (Billboard)	3
