= Girls' Life =

US magazine

- Cover of March 2016 issue with Zendaya
- Categories: Teen magazine
- Frequency: Bimonthly
- Publisher: Karen Bokram
- Founder: Karen Bokram
- First issue: August 1994
- Country: United States
- Based in: Baltimore
- Language: English
- Website: www.girlslife.com
- ISSN: 1078-3326

Girls' Life is an American teen magazine. It was launched in 1994 by Monarch Services. It was later purchased by Karen Bokram under the Girls' Life Acquisition Corporation The magazine is headquartered in Baltimore, Maryland.

== History and profile ==
Issues of Girls' Life contain information and advice on topics such as fashion, cosmetics, hairstyles, relationships, peer pressure, time management, stress-relief, and self-esteem. Girls' Life website hosts a penpal program, games, and discussions. It is targeted to girls 8–12. The magazine cover has featured Disney stars, such as Laura Marano, Miley Cyrus, Selena Gomez and The Cheetah Girls, and other celebrities such as Mandy Moore and Hayden Panettiere that may bring interest to older girls. Demi Lovato, Ariana Grande, Emma Roberts, Emma Watson, Selena Gomez, and Ashley Tisdale have appeared on the cover of Girls' Life magazine twice.

It covers a range of topics, from heavier topics such as dealing with racism, sexual abuse, and feelings for boys, as well as lighter topics such as fashion, beauty, skin care, embarrassing moments. There are often recipes, gift ideas, and interviews. The title "Girls' Life" is a play on the magazine title "Boys' Life," which was first published in 1911.

The magazine was once notable for the fact it did not feature celebrities on the cover, but eventually began featuring celebrity covers, the first being Alexis Bledel of Gilmore Girls, ceding to the industry's conventional wisdom that covers with known personalities sell more copies. Other features include:

- Letters to the editor
- Giveaway Calendars (Prizes you can enter for each day)
- Dear Carol
- Best new trend
- Cute and Cheap Fashion
- Fashion: Love your body
- Quizzes
- Horoscopes
- Special Report
- Best new beauty trend
- GP BIs (Best friend advice)
- Body Q&A
- Guys Q&A
- Boyfriend tips
