= The Shade Room =

American media company

- Website type: Entertainment News
- Available in: English
- Editor: Angelica Nwandu
- Website: www.theshaderoom.com
- Commercial: Yes
- Launched: March 2014; 12 years ago
- Current status: Active

The Shade Room (TSR) is a media company, founded by Angelica Nwandu in March 2014. Instagram-based, The Shade Room offers celebrity and trending news on an hourly basis, predominantly within the African American community; The New York Times called it the "TMZ of Instagram". "Shade" in this case refers to a slang term for quips or wisecracks, especially those made with the intent of debasing their target(s). As of 2024, the platform has also evolved to cover political news.

Nwandu lives and works from Los Angeles and employs a staff of forty working on The Shade Room. The Shade Room has also been compared to MediaTakeOut with one exception, the majority of The Shade Room's news is reported primarily on Instagram.

== Format ==
Nwandu avoided the typical blog format in favor of publishing full-length stories on Instagram. Nwandu found Instagram suited to her vision for The Shade Room due to its image-based format. After getting established in the Instagram format, the site was then expanded to include community news, trending news, and user interaction. The Shade Room refers to readers as "roommates", who often provide leads on celebrities to The Shade Room personnel.

Readers of The Shade Room are called "Roommates" because they "live" in The Shade Room, some visitors return on a daily basis.

By the end of 2015, the site was reported to have 2.6 million followers, although the company has less than a dozen employees.

In June 2016, Cosmopolitan reported that The Shade Room's followers across platforms totaled more than eight million people.

The site now boasts more than 28.1 million followers and has since launched a new brand, The Shade Room Teens, that has 4.8 million followers.

The high readership has drawn celebrity attention to The Shade Room and some have even participated directly on the site. Nwandu no longer is the primary voice of the site, having stepped back to allow others participate.

In October 2020, The Shade Room reported 21 million followers on its Instagram account.

== Coverage ==
On October 10, 2015, The Shade Room was one of the first to report that Lamar Odom was found at Dennis Hof's Love Ranch in Nevada.

On December 12, 2015, Countess Vaughn, former star of the hit show Moesha posted an apology to Brandy on Instagram. This apology was monumental as Brandy told Vibe Magazine in 1998 that Vaughn left the show out of jealousy. The Shade Room was the first to report the apology with platforms like Vibe, Black Entertainment Television and Rolling Out Magazine covering the story shortly thereafter.

In January 2016, The Shade Room covered the love triangle brewing between Soulja Boy, Nia Riley and Nas Smith, all reality stars from the hit show Love & Hip Hop: Hollywood. This controversy sparked an original song where The Shade Room was mentioned in the lyrics. In an interview with The Shade Room in 2017, rapper Ludacris shut down online discourse that his music career was done. In April 2018, The Shade Room was one of the first outlets to break the news that NBA athlete Tristan Thompson was cheating on Khloé Kardashian throughout her pregnancy.

In April 2019, The Shade Room announced a step into original programming with three new series: Petty Court, Struggle Chef, and F-boy Chronicles. Publishing interviews in 2020 with Former President Barack Obama, Former Vice President Kamala Harris, Former Georgia State Representative Stacey Abrams, and Presidential Candidate Joe Biden, The Shade Room encouraged U.S. citizens to register to vote, contributing to the 2020 U.S. presidential election of President Joe Biden. That year, The Shade Room was Instagram's third most actively engaged account.

In August 2021, The Shade Room reported that Barry Hankerson would revive Blackground Records under the name Blackground Records 2.0 and introduce singer Autumn Marini as the label's first artist. In December 2021, The Shade Room published an interview with NeNe Leakes in which she confirmed that she had begun dating again following the death of her husband, Gregg Leakes. That year, Comscore's Shareablee rankings listed The Shade Room as the top social brand by cross-platform engagement and the leading U.S. media publisher by total social actions.

In November 2022, The Shade Room launched TSR Shop, a community-driven e-commerce platform featuring Black-owned brands. The launch coincided with efforts by African-American online shoppers to support Black-owned businesses, a trend that linked to efforts to address the racial wealth gap. In 2023, The Shade Room shared an exclusive statement from Dwight Howard and his legal team amidst his involvement in a sexual assault case. The statement claimed that the Howard had never assaulted anyone, and the case was dismissed a year later.

In 2024, The Shade Room interviewed Democratic presidential candidate Kamala Harris during the U.S. presidential election campaign. In 2026, The Shade Room went viral for an interview clip with Raven-Symoné, in which the former Disney Channel child actress shared a controversial list of fellow Disney actors who belong on the Disney "Mount Rushmore."

== Accolades ==
The Shade Room received several notable awards, including:

Awards and recognition
Year	Work / Entry	Award	Category	Result	Ref
2018	The Shade Room	BET Social Awards	Best Tea	Won	
2024	The Shade Room	BET Hip Hop Award	Best Hip Hop Platform	Nominated	
2024	Bad Boys 4 x Sony Pictures Entertainment	Digiday Awards	Best Creative	Finalist	
2025	The Shade Room	Shorty Awards (17th Annual)	Site of the Year	Won	
2025	My Black Job x Harris For President	Digiday Awards	Best Use of Social	Finalist	
2025	My Black Job x Harris For President	Telly Awards	Social Impact (Branded Content)	Silver Winner	
2025	My Black Job x Harris For President	Shorty Impact Awards (10th Annual)	Government & Politics	Gold Honor	
2025	My Black Job x Harris For President	MarCom Awards	Social Media Marketing Campaign	Platinum Winner	
2025	Roomie Diaries x Gilead/Healthysexual	Shorty Impact Awards (10th Annual)	Healthcare & Pharma	Gold Honor	
2025	Roomie Diaries x Gilead/Healthysexual	MarCom Awards	Social Media Marketing Campaign	Platinum Winner	
2025	Hot & Ain't Bothered x Astellas	MarCom Awards	Social Media Marketing Campaign	Gold Winner	
2026	TSR Investigates: Are Your Braids Poisoning You? Inside the Toxic Synthetic Hair Industry	Shorty Awards (18th Annual)	News & Media	Finalist	
2026	Don Lemon Cooks Mom's Succotash Recipe, Talks Elon, Wedding Guests and More! (Dishin' It)	Telly Awards	Online – General News & News Feature	Bronze Winner	
2026	Surviving Epstein: Lisa Phillips Opens Up About Grooming, Power, and Speaking Her Truth (Stepping Into The Shade Room)	Telly Awards	Online – General Interview & Talk Show	Bronze Winner	
2026	Surviving Epstein: Lisa Phillips Opens Up About Grooming, Power, and Speaking Her Truth (Stepping Into The Shade Room)	Webby Awards	Interview or Talk Show (Video/Film)	Won	
2026	Surviving Epstein: Lisa Phillips Opens Up About Grooming, Power, and Speaking Her Truth (Stepping Into The Shade Room)	Webby Awards – People's Voice	Interview or Talk Show (Video/Film)	Won	
