= Tiger Beat =

American magazine

- Tiger Beat magazine, first issue
- Categories: Teen, celebrity
- Frequency: Monthly
- First issue: September 1965
- Final issue: Winter 2019
- Company: Tiger Beat Media, Inc.
- Country: United States
- Based in: California
- Language: English
- ISSN: 0040-7380

Tiger Beat was an American teen fan magazine published from 1965 to 2021, marketed primarily to adolescent girls. The magazine had a print edition that was sold at stores until 2018, continuing only online until it ceased publication.

== History and profile ==
Tiger Beat was founded in September 1965 by Charles "Chuck" Laufer, his brother Ira Laufer, and television producer and host Lloyd Thaxton. The magazine featured teen idol gossip and carried articles on films, music and fashion. Charles Laufer described the magazine's content as "guys in their 20s singing 'La La' songs to 13-year-old girls."

A distinctive element of Tiger Beat was its covers, which featured cut-and-paste collaged photos – primarily head shots – of current teen idols. For the first twelve issues, Thaxton's face appeared at the top corner of the cover (at first the magazine was titled Lloyd Thaxton's Tiger Beat), and he also contributed a column. After 2016, the magazine cover featured a single image of a celebrity.

During the 1960s, The Laufer Company leveraged the teen market dominated by Tiger Beat with similar magazines, including FaVE and Monkee Spectacular. In 1998, Tiger Beat was sold by publisher Sterling/MacFadden to Primedia (now Rent Group), which in 2003 sold the magazine to Scott Laufer, the son of magazine founder Charles Laufer. Until 2014, Laufer also produced the similar teen magazine Bop. After 2015, Tiger Beat was published by Los Angeles–based Tiger Beat Media, Inc.

== In popular culture ==
Jude Doyle founded the blog Tiger Beatdown (a punning reference to Tiger Beat) in 2008. It concluded in 2013.

== See also ==
- List of teen magazines
