= Nickelodeon Records =

Record label

- Parent company: Nickelodeon
- Founded: 1993; 33 years ago
- Founder: Nickelodeon
- Status: Active
- Distributors: Sony Music; AWAL; Universal Music Group via Republic Records
- Genre: Teen pop, children's music, television soundtrack
- Country of origin: United States
- Location: New York City, New York, U.S.
- Official website: Official website (archived)

Nickelodeon Records (known as Nick Records from 2001 to 2010) is the record label for the children's television channel Nickelodeon, which is owned by Paramount Skydance. The label featured new and emerging young musical artists, "triple threat" singers who would also act and dance on the network's series, and soundtrack compilations based on Nickelodeon TV shows.

Nickelodeon released its first soundtrack album in 1993. The "Nick Records" name was first used in 2001, when Nickelodeon announced a partnership with Jive Records to form a new record label. In September 2004, Nick Records announced a new partner, Bertelsmann Music Group (later relaunched as BMG Rights Management). In 2007, a year before Sony Music acquired BMG’s labels after the end of their merger, Nickelodeon formed a new partnership with Sony to produce original soundtracks and shows. In October 2022, Republic Records announced a worldwide music deal with Nickelodeon, but these releases do not use the Nickelodeon Records or Nick Records name.

== Music by Nickelodeon Inc. ==
Music by Nickelodeon Inc. is a separate division of Paramount Global that administers Nickelodeon's music catalog, including the songs used for Nick Records releases. It manages all of the music produced by Nickelodeon for its original shows. The division is affiliated with BMI and was founded in Delaware. Nickelodeon has also established two other publishers for its music: Tunes by Nickelodeon Inc. (affiliated with ASCAP) and Nickelodeon Notes Inc. (affiliated with SESAC).

== Artists ==
=== Current ===
- Blue's Clues (1999–2006; 2019–present)
- Rugrats (1998–2004; 2021–present)
- SpongeBob SquarePants (2001–present)
- Dora the Explorer (2004–2013; 2019; 2022–present)
- Teenage Mutant Ninja Turtles (2012–2020; 2023–present)
- PAW Patrol (2018–present)
- Blaze and the Monster Machines (2019–present)
- Bubble Guppies (2019–present)
- The Loud House (2020–present)
- Santiago of the Seas (2020–present)
- Nick Jr. Channel (2020–present)
- Wallykazam! (2021–present)
- Jeremy Zuckerman (2023–present)

=== Future ===
- Garfield (TBA)

=== Former ===
- Ren & Stimpy by Billy West (1993–1995)
- Kel Mitchell (1996–1999)
- Rocko's Modern Life (1998; 2023)
- Hey Arnold! (1998–2001; 2020)
- Nick Cannon (2001–2003)
- Drake Bell (2004–2008)
- Jamie Lynn Spears (2005–2008)
- Emma Roberts (2005)
- Nat and Alex Wolff (formerly known as The Naked Brothers Band) (2005–2008)
- The Backyardigans (2005-2008)
- The Fairly OddParents (2005; 2023)
- Miranda Cosgrove (2007–2012)
- Victoria Justice (2009–2012)
- Big Time Rush (2009–2014)
- Keke Palmer (2009–2012)
- Ariana Grande (2010–2012)
- Elizabeth Gillies (2010–2012)
- The Fresh Beat Band (2010-2012)
- Rachel Crow (2012)
- JoJo Siwa (2016–2021)
- Cast of Henry Danger (2019)
- Noggin (2020–2024)
- Shimmer and Shine (2020)
- It's Pony (2020–2022)
- That Girl Lay Lay (2021–2024)
