= Victoria Justice discography =

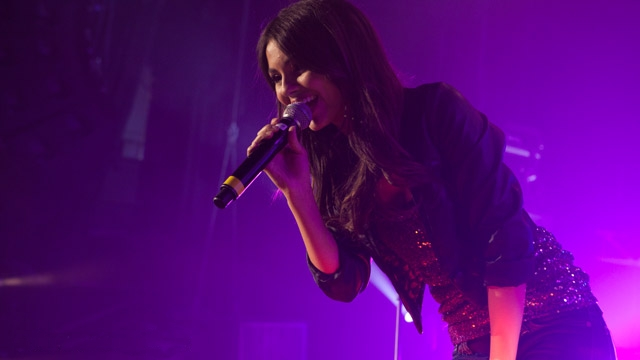
- Justice performing for Walmart Soundcheck in 2011
- Extended plays: 3
- Soundtrack albums: 1
- Singles: 23
- Music videos: 26
- Promotional singles: 5
- Charity singles: 3

The discography of American singer Victoria Justice consists of one soundtrack album, three extended plays, 23 singles (including 10 as a featured artist), five promotional singles, three charity singles, and 26 music videos.

== Soundtrack albums ==
List of soundtrack albums, with selected chart positions
Title	Soundtrack album details	Peak chart positions										Sales	Certifications
Title	Soundtrack album details	US	US Kid	US Sound.	AUT	GER	SPA	SWI	UK Down.	UK Comp.	UK Sound.	Sales	Certifications
Victorious: Music from the Hit TV Show (with Victorious cast)	Released: August 2, 2011; Formats: CD, digital download, streaming; Labels: Nickelodeon, Columbia	5	1	1	35	100	36	69	66	10	13	US: 41,000 (Note: Sales of Victorious: Music from the Hit TV Show in the United States as of August 10, 2011.)	BPI: Silver

== Extended plays ==
List of extended plays, with selected chart positions
Title	Extended play details	Peak chart positions					Sales
Title	Extended play details	US	US Kid	US Sound.	UK Comp.	UK Sound.	Sales
Victorious 2.0: More Music from the Hit TV Show (with Victorious cast)	Released: June 5, 2012; Formats: CD, digital download, streaming; Labels: Nickelodeon, Columbia	18	1	2	44	16	US: 70,000 (Note: Sales of Victorious 2.0: More Music from the Hit TV Show in the United States as of December 22, 2012.)
Victorious 3.0: Even More Music from the Hit TV Show (with Victorious cast)	Released: November 6, 2012; Formats: CD, digital download, streaming; Labels: Nickelodeon, Columbia	159	6	10	—	—	US: 3,000 (Note: Sales of Victorious 3.0: Even More Music from the Hit TV Show in the United States as of November 24, 2012.)
Afterlife of the Party (Music from the Netflix Film) (with Spencer Sutherland and Jessica Rose Weiss)	Released: September 2, 2021; Formats: Digital download, streaming; Label: Maisie	—	—	—	—	—	
"—" denotes items which did not chart in that country.

== Singles ==
=== As lead artist ===
List of singles as lead artist, showing year released and album name
Title	Year	Sales	Album
"Gold"	2013	US: 33,000 (Note: Sales of "Gold" in the United States as of August 19, 2014.)	Non-album singles
"Treat Myself"	2020		Non-album singles
"Stay"	2021		Non-album singles
"Too F*ckin' Nice"	2021		Non-album singles
"Last Man Standing"	2023		Non-album singles
"Only a Stranger"	2023		Non-album singles
"Big Girls Don't Cry" (with Toby Gad)	2023		Piano Diaries – The Hits
"Tripped"	2024		Non-album singles
"Raw"	2024		Non-album singles
"Hate the World Without U (Maddy's Song)"	2024		Non-album singles
"Down"	2024		Non-album singles
"Love Zombie"	2025		Non-album singles
"Santa Darlin'"	2025		Non-album singles

=== As featured artist ===
List of singles as featured artist, with selected chart positions, showing year released and album name
Title	Year	Peak chart positions						Sales	Certifications	Album
Title	Year	US	US Hol. Dig.	US Kid	US Pop Dig.	AUS Hit.	UK	Sales	Certifications	Album
"Make It Shine" (Victorious cast featuring Victoria Justice)	2010	— (Note: "Make It Shine" did not enter the Billboard Hot 100, but peaked at number 16 on the Bubbling Under Hot 100 chart.)	—	6	39	—	—	US: 100,000 (Note: Sales of "Make It Shine" in the United States as of June 6, 2010.)		Victorious: Music from the Hit TV Show
"Freak the Freak Out" (Victorious cast featuring Victoria Justice)	2010	50	—	6	21	7	176	US: 600,000 (Note: Sales of "Freak the Freak Out" in the United States as of November 15, 2011.)	RIAA: Gold	Victorious: Music from the Hit TV Show
"Beggin' on Your Knees" (Victorious cast featuring Victoria Justice)	2011	58	—	1	19	—	—	US: 28,000 (Note: Sales of "Beggin' on Your Knees" in the United States as of April 16, 2011.)	BPI: Silver	Victorious: Music from the Hit TV Show
"Best Friend's Brother" (Victorious cast featuring Victoria Justice)	2011	86	—	1	27	—	—			Victorious: Music from the Hit TV Show
"Leave It All to Shine" (iCarly and Victorious casts featuring Miranda Cosgrove and Victoria Justice)	2011	— (Note: "Leave It All to Shine" did not enter the Billboard Hot 100, but peaked at number 24 on the Bubbling Under Hot 100 chart.)	—	2	—	—	—			Victorious: Music from the Hit TV Show
"It's Not Christmas Without You" (Victorious cast featuring Victoria Justice)	2011	—	23	5	—	—	—			Merry Nickmas
"You're the Reason" (Victorious cast featuring Victoria Justice)	2011	— (Note: "You're the Reason" did not enter the Billboard Hot 100, but peaked at number 24 on the Bubbling Under Hot 100 chart.)	—	1	—	—	—			Victorious: Music from the Hit TV Show
"Countdown" (Victorious cast featuring Leon Thomas III and Victoria Justice)	2012	—	—	10	—	—	—			Victorious 2.0: More Music from the Hit TV Show
"Take a Hint" (Victorious cast featuring Victoria Justice and Elizabeth Gillies)	2012	— (Note: "Take a Hint" did not enter the Billboard Hot 100, but peaked at number eight on the Bubbling Under Hot 100 chart.)	—	1	27	—	—		RIAA: Platinum; BPI: Silver	Victorious 2.0: More Music from the Hit TV Show
"Make It in America" (Victorious cast featuring Victoria Justice)	2012	—	—	1	—	—	—			Victorious 2.0: More Music from the Hit TV Show
"—" denotes items which did not chart in that country.

=== Promotional singles ===
List of promotional singles, with selected chart positions, showing year released and album name
Title	Year	Peak chart positions	Album
Title	Year	US Kid	Album
"Almost Paradise" (with Hunter Hayes)	2011	—	Footloose: Music from the Motion Picture
"L.A. Boyz" (Victorious cast featuring Victoria Justice and Ariana Grande)	2012	6	Victorious 3.0: Even More Music from the Hit TV Show
"Toucha, Toucha, Toucha, Touch Me"	2016	—	The Rocky Horror Picture Show: Let's Do the Time Warp Again
"Over at the Frankenstein Place" (with Ryan McCartan and Reeve Carney)	2016	—	The Rocky Horror Picture Show: Let's Do the Time Warp Again
"Everybody's Breakin' Up" (Note: "Everybody's Breakin' Up" was released as a standalone promotional single for the film Trust.)	2021	*	Non-album promotional single
"—" denotes items which did not chart in that country. "*" denotes the chart is discontinued.

=== Charity singles ===
List of charity singles, with selected chart positions, showing year released
Title	Year	Peak chart positions						Sales
Title	Year	US Pop Dig.	BEL (FL) Tip	FRA	SPA Phy. Dig.	UK Sales	UK Indie	Sales
"Friends Count" (Note: "Friends Count" was a non-profit released for Build-A-Bear Workshop.)	2012	—	—	—	—	—	—	
"Girl Up" (Note: "Girl Up" was a non-profit released for Girl Up.)	2013	—	—	—	—	—	—	
"Love Song to the Earth" (with Paul McCartney, Jon Bon Jovi, Sheryl Crow, Fergie, Colbie Caillat, Natasha Bedingfield, Leona Lewis, Sean Paul, John Rzeznik, Krewella, Angélique Kidjo, Kelsea Ballerini, Nicole Scherzinger, Christina Grimmie and Q'orianka Kilcher)	2015	36	61	64	30	96	21	US: 11,000 (Note: Sales of "Love Song to the Earth" in the United States as of September 18, 2015.)
"—" denotes items which did not chart in that country.

== Other charted songs ==
List of other charted songs, with selected chart positions, showing year released and album name
Title	Year	Peak chart positions			Album
Title	Year	US Bub.	US Kid	US Pop Dig.	Album
"All I Want Is Everything" (Victorious cast featuring Victoria Justice)	2011	—	2	—	Victorious: Music from the Hit TV Show
"I Want You Back" (Victorious cast featuring Victoria Justice)	2011	8	1	38	Victorious: Music from the Hit TV Show
"Song 2 You" (Victorious cast featuring Leon Thomas III and Victoria Justice)	2011	—	8	—	Victorious: Music from the Hit TV Show
"Tell Me That You Love Me" (Victorious cast featuring Victoria Justice and Leon Thomas III)	2011	—	11	—	Victorious: Music from the Hit TV Show
"Finally Falling" (Victorious cast featuring Victoria Justice)	2011	—	10	—	Victorious: Music from the Hit TV Show
"Shut Up and Dance" (Victorious cast featuring Victoria Justice)	2012	—	10	—	Victorious 2.0: More Music from the Hit TV Show
"5 Fingaz to the Face" (Victorious cast featuring Victoria Justice)	2012	—	8	—	Victorious 2.0: More Music from the Hit TV Show
"Here's 2 Us" (Victorious cast featuring Victoria Justice)	2012	—	8	—	Victorious 3.0: Even More Music from the Hit TV Show
"Faster Than Boyz" (Victorious cast featuring Victoria Justice)	2012	—	8	—	Victorious 3.0: Even More Music from the Hit TV Show
"—" denotes items which did not chart.

== Music videos ==
List of music videos, showing year released, other artists featured and directors
Title	Year	Other artist(s)	Director(s)	Ref.
As lead artist
"Girl Up"	2013	None	Rachel McDonald	
"Gold"	2013	None	Chandler Lass	
"Shake"	2013	None	Unknown	
"Love Song to the Earth"	2015	Paul McCartney; Jon Bon Jovi; Sheryl Crow; Fergie; Colbie Caillat; Natasha Bedingfield; Leona Lewis; Sean Paul; Johnny Rzeznik; Krewella; Angélique Kidjo; Kelsea Ballerini; Christina Grimmie; Nicole Scherzinger; Q'orianka Kilcher	Trey Fanjoy	
"Treat Myself"	2020	None	John Logsdon; Patrick Dwyer	
"Stay"	2021	None	Al Kalyk	
"Everybody's Breakin' Up"	2021	None	Brian DeCubellis	
"Too F*ckin' Nice"	2021	None	Unknown	
"Big Girls Don't Cry"	2023	Toby Gad	Unknown	
"Raw"	2024	None	Billy Seeberg	
"Raw" (tropical house mix)	2024	Toby Gad	Unknown	
"Down"	2024	None	Luis De Peña	
As featured artist
"Make It Shine"	2010	Victorious cast	Unknown	
"Finally Falling"	2010	Victorious cast	Unknown	
"Freak the Freak Out"	2010	Victorious cast	Marcus Wagner	
"Beggin' on Your Knees"	2011	Victorious cast	Marcus Wagner	
"Best Friend's Brother"	2011	Victorious cast	Marine Prog	
"Leave It All to Shine"	2011	iCarly and Victorious casts Miranda Cosgrove	Unknown	
"I Want You Back"	2011	Victorious cast	Unknown	
"All I Want Is Everything"	2011	Victorious cast	Lex Halaby	
"You're the Reason" (acoustic version)	2011	Victorious cast	Wayne Isham	
"Take a Hint"	2012	Victorious cast Elizabeth Gillies	Unknown	
"Make It in America"	2012	Victorious cast	Anna Mastro	
"L.A. Boyz"	2012	Victorious cast Ariana Grande	Unknown	
"Here's 2 Us"	2012	Victorious cast	Unknown	
"Faster Than Boyz"	2013	Victorious cast	Unknown	
Guest appearances
"Lost"	2008	Menudo	Marcus Raboy	
"You Don't Know Me"	2012	Victorious cast Elizabeth Gillies	Unknown	
"Motorcycle"	2024	Remi Wolf	Sweetiepie	

== See also ==
- List of songs recorded by Victoria Justice
