= List of songs recorded by Victoria Justice =

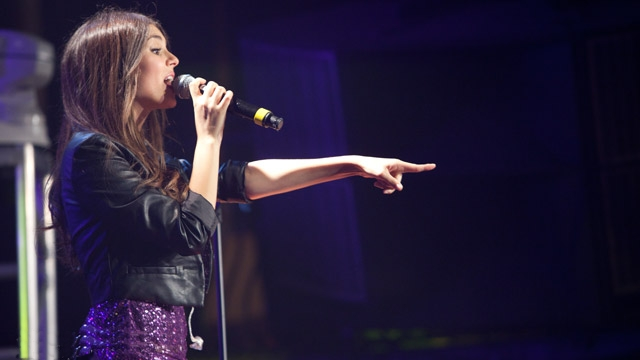
Victoria Justice in 2011

Victoria Justice is an American singer and actress. Her music career started in 2011 when she contributed vocals to the soundtrack albums for the American TV sitcom, Victorious, in which she also starred from 2010 to 2013. Three soundtrack albums were released between 2011 and 2012.

== Songs ==
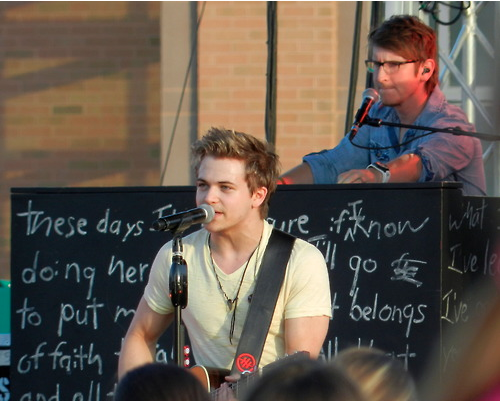
Hunter Hayes collaborated with Justice for "Almost Paradise".

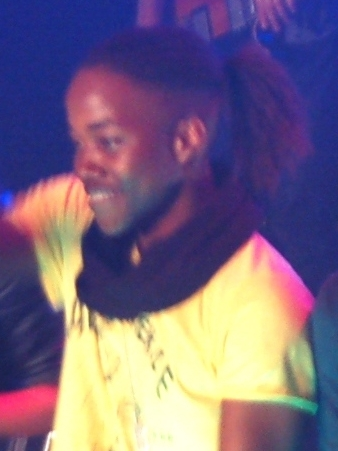
Leon Thomas III duetted with Justice on "Countdown", "Song 2 You" and "Tell Me That You Love Me".

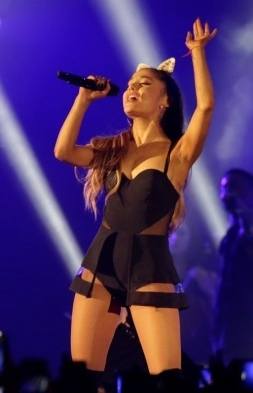
Ariana Grande duetted with Justice on "L.A. Boyz".

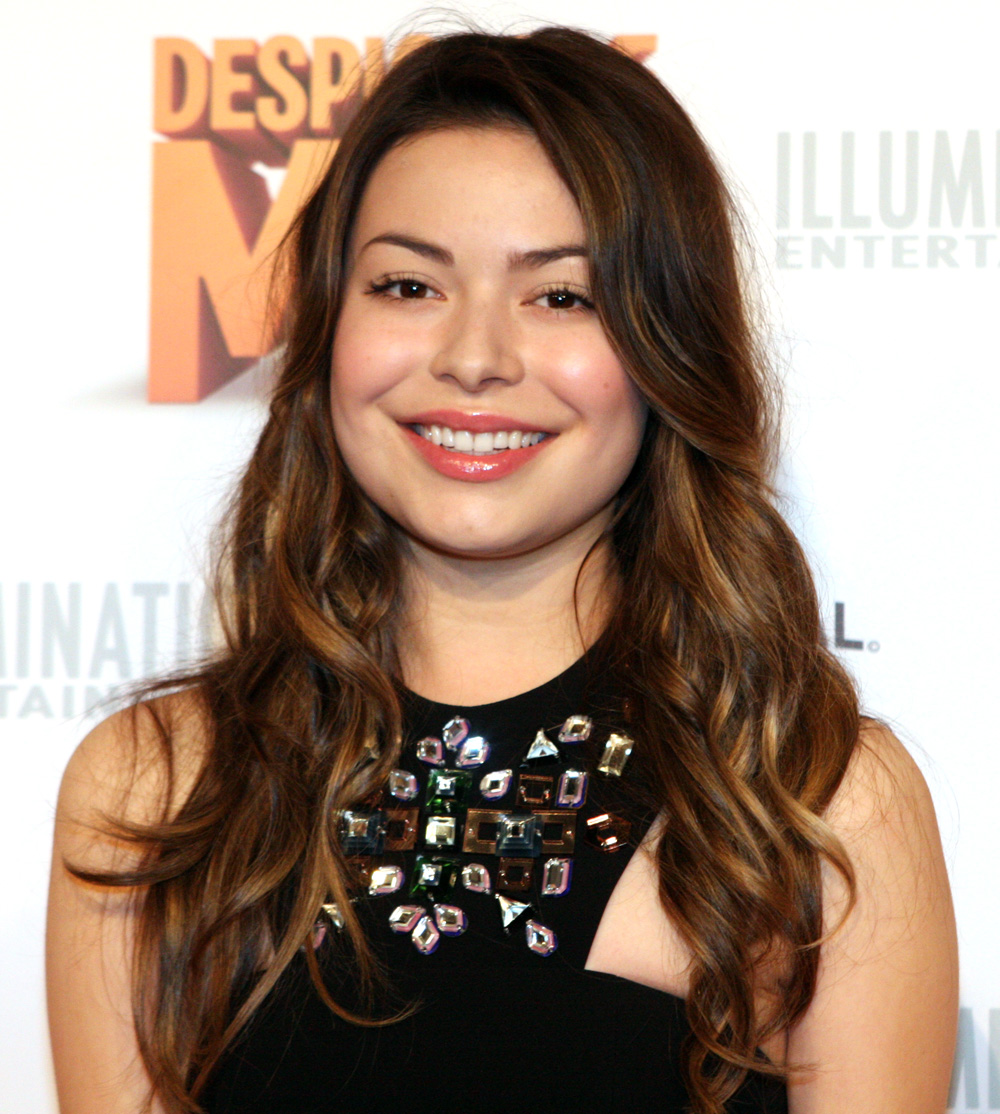
Miranda Cosgrove collaborated with Justice for "Leave It All to Shine".

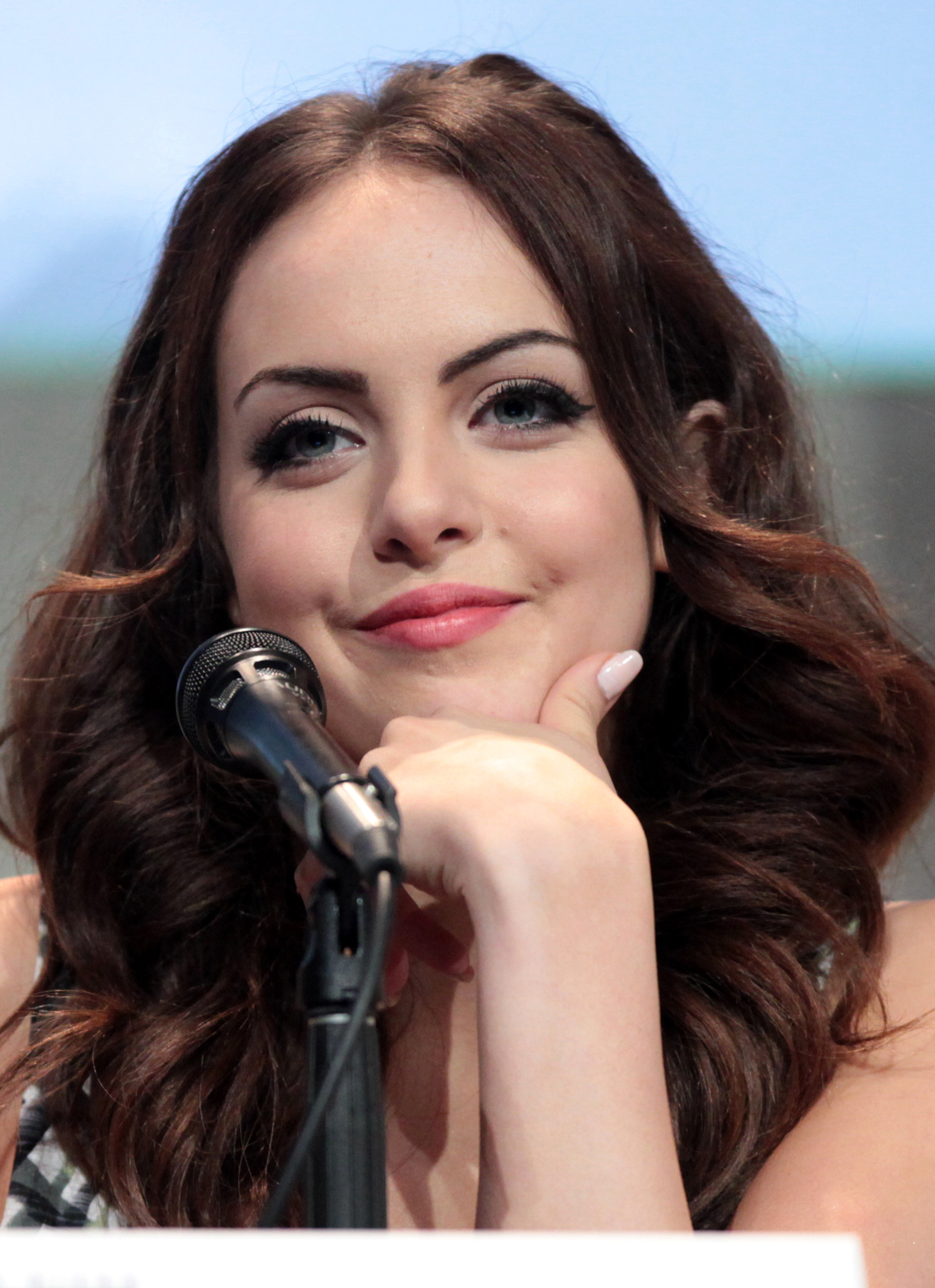
Justice duetted with Elizabeth Gillies on "Take a Hint".

=== Released ===
Key
†	Indicates single release
#	Indicates promotional single release
‡	Indicates charity single release
•	Indicates uncredited vocal contribution

Name of song, other performers, writers, originating album, and year released
Song	Other performer(s)	Writer(s)	Album	Year	Ref.
"5 Fingaz to the Face"	Victorious cast	Michael Corcoran; Eric Goldman; Dan Schneider	Victorious 2.0: More Music from the Hit TV Show	2012	
"All I Want Is Everything"	Victorious cast	Lindy Robbins; Toby Gad	Victorious: Music from the Hit TV Show	2011	
"Almost Paradise" #	Hunter Hayes	Eric Carmen; Dean Pitchford	Footloose: Music from the Motion Picture	2011	
"Bad Boys"	Victorious cast	Jordan Reynolds; Kara DioGuardi; Chris DeStefano	Victorious 3.0: Even More Music from the Hit TV Show	2012	
"Beggin' on Your Knees" †	Victorious cast	Shellback; Savan Kotecha	Victorious: Music from the Hit TV Show	2011	
"Best Friend's Brother" †	Victorious cast	Allan Grigg; Savan Kotecha; Victoria Justice	Victorious: Music from the Hit TV Show	2011	
"Big Girls Don't Cry" †	Toby Gad	Stacy Ferguson; Toby Gad	Piano Diaries – The Hits	2023	
"Blessed"	Toby Gad	Lindy Robbins; Nicole Cohen Kole; Toby Gad	Piano Diaries Christmas	2025	
"Cheer Me Up"	Victorious cast	Natasha Bedingfield; Toby Gad	Victorious 3.0: Even More Music from the Hit TV Show	2012	
"Countdown" #	Victorious cast Leon Thomas III	Allan P Grigg; Leon Thomas III; Travis Garland	Victorious 2.0: More Music from the Hit TV Show	2012	
"Dammit Janet"	Ryan McCartan	Richard O'Brien	The Rocky Horror Picture Show: Let's Do the Time Warp Again	2016	
"Don't Care What You Do"	None	Marcelo Quinonez; Lenore Venokur	None	2016	
"Don't Dream It"	Laverne Cox; Tim Curry; Ben Vereen; Ryan McCartan	Richard O'Brien	The Rocky Horror Picture Show: Let's Do the Time Warp Again	2016	
"Don't You (Forget About Me)"	Victorious cast	Keith Forsey; Steve Schiff	Victorious 2.0: More Music from the Hit TV Show	2012	
"Down" †	None	Tobias Martin Gad; Victoria Justice; Will Jay	None	2024	
"Everybody's Breakin' Up" #	None	Leon Huff; Kenny Gamble	None	2021	
"Faster Than Boyz"	Victorious cast	Allan Grigg; Victoria Justice	Victorious 3.0: Even More Music from the Hit TV Show	2012	
"Finally Falling"	Victorious cast	Michael Corcoran; CJ Abraham; Dan Schneider; Drake Bell	Victorious: Music from the Hit TV Show	2011	
"Freak the Freak Out" †	Victorious cast	CJ Abraham; Michael Corcoran; Dan Schneider; Nick Hexum; Zack Hexum	Victorious: Music from the Hit TV Show	2010	
"Friends Count" ‡	None	Unknown	None	2012	
"Girl Up" ‡	None	Toby Gad; Victoria Justice	None	2013	
"Gold" †	None	Ben Camp; Jakob Jerlström; Jason Weiss; Ludvig Söderberg; Peter Thomas; Sam Shrieve; Tove Nilsson	None	2013	
"Hate the World Without U (Maddy's Song)" †	None	Grant Knoche; Tayler Buono; Victoria Justice	None	2024	
"Here's 2 Us"	Victorious cast	Evan Bogart; Lindy Robbins; Emanuel Kiriakou; Michelle Branch	Victorious 3.0: Even More Music from the Hit TV Show	2012	
"Home"	Spencer Sutherland	Keaton Stromberg; Spencer Sutherland; Victoria Justice	Afterlife of the Party (Music from the Netflix Film)	2021	
"I Want You Back"	Victorious cast	The Corporation	Victorious: Music from the Hit TV Show	2011	
"Intro"	2AM Club	2AM Club	Clinton Sparks Presents 2AM Club in Moon Tower	2013	
"It's Not Christmas Without You" †	Victorious cast	Dan Schneider; Eric Goldman; Michael Corcoran	Merry Nickmas	2011	
"L.A. Boyz" #	Victorious cast Ariana Grande	Lindy Robbins; Allan Grigg; Dan Schneider; Michael Corcoran	Victorious 3.0: Even More Music from the Hit TV Show	2012	
"Last Man Standing" †	None	Louis Biancaniello; Michael Biancaniello; Molly Moore; Tayler Buono; Victoria Justice	None	2023	
"Leave It All to Shine" †	iCarly and Victorious casts Miranda Cosgrove	Lukasz Gottwald; Michael Corcoran; Dan Schneider	Victorious: Music from the Hit TV Show	2011	
"Lonely Love Song"	Spectacular! cast •	Matthew Gerrard; Robbie Nevil	Spectacular!: Music from the Nickelodeon Original Movie	2009	
"Love Song to the Earth" ‡	Paul McCartney; Jon Bon Jovi; Sheryl Crow; Fergie; Colbie Caillat; Natasha Bedingfield; Leona Lewis; Sean Paul; John Rzeznik; Krewella; Angélique Kidjo; Kelsea Ballerini; Nicole Scherzinger; Christina Grimmie; Q'orianka Kilcher	Natasha Bedingfield; Toby Gad; Sean Paul Henriques; John Shanks	None	2015	
"Love Zombie" †	None	Evan Bogard; Greg Wells; Matthew Hales; Victoria Justice; Josh Cumbee	None	2025	
"Make It in America" †	Victorious cast	Martin Johnson; Victoria Justice	Victorious 2.0: More Music from the Hit TV Show	2012	
"Make It Shine" †	Victorious cast	Lukasz Gottwald; Michael Corcoran; Dan Schneider	Victorious: Music from the Hit TV Show	2010	
"Nuts About You"	None	Marcelo Quinonez; Lenore Venokur	None	2016	
"On the Wings of a Dream"	Spectacular! cast •	Jay Landers; Matthew Gerrard; Robbie Nevil	Spectacular!: Music from the Nickelodeon Original Movie	2009	
"Only a Stranger" †	None	Grant Knoche; Tayler Buono; Victoria Justice	None	2023	
"Over at the Frankenstein Place" #	Ryan McCartan; Reeve Carney	Richard O'Brien	The Rocky Horror Picture Show: Let's Do the Time Warp Again	2016	
"Planet Hot Dog"	Laverne Cox; Ryan McCartan; Ben Vereen	Richard O'Brien	The Rocky Horror Picture Show: Let's Do the Time Warp Again	2016	
"Raw" †	None	Emma Rosen; Tobias Martin Gad; Victoria Justice; Will Jay	None	2024	
"Rockin' Around the Christmas Tree"	None	Johnny Marks	Merry Nickmas	2012	
"Rose Tint My World"	Annaleigh Ashford; Staz Nair; Ryan McCartan	Richard O'Brien	The Rocky Horror Picture Show: Let's Do the Time Warp Again	2016	
"Santa Darlin'" †	None	Toby Gad; Victoria Justice; Will Jay	None	2025	
"Shake"	None	Adam Messinger; Hayley Gene Penner; Nasri Atweh; Nolan Lambroza; Victoria Justice	None	2013	
"Shut Up and Dance"	Victorious cast	Michael Corcoran; Eric Goldman; Lindy Robbins; Dan Schneider	Victorious 2.0: More Music from the Hit TV Show	2012	
"Sleigh Ride"	Nickelodeon cast •	Leroy Anderson	Merry Nickmas	2012	
"Song 2 You"	Victorious cast Leon Thomas III	Josh Schwartz; Brian Kierulf; Leon Thomas III	Victorious: Music from the Hit TV Show	2011	
"Stay" †	None	Louis Schoorl; Mitch Allan; Tia Scola; Victoria Justice	None	2021	
"Super Heroes"	Ryan McCartan; Tim Curry	Richard O'Brien	The Rocky Horror Picture Show: Let's Do the Time Warp Again	2016	
"Take a Hint" †	Victorious cast Elizabeth Gillies	Meghan Kabir; Kevin Kadish; James Michael	Victorious 2.0: More Music from the Hit TV Show	2012	
"Tell Me That You Love Me"	Victorious cast Leon Thomas III	Michael Corcoran; CJ Abraham; Dan Schneider	Victorious: Music from the Hit TV Show	2011	
"Things We Do for Love"	Spectacular! cast •	Eric Stewart; Graham Gouldman	Spectacular!: Music from the Nickelodeon Original Movie	2009	
"Too F*ckin' Nice" †	None	Cooper Holzman; Dylan Bauld; Paris Carney; Victoria Justice	None	2021	
"Toucha, Toucha, Toucha, Touch Me" #	None	Richard O'Brien	The Rocky Horror Picture Show: Let's Do the Time Warp Again	2016	
"Treat Myself" †	None	Jonathan Pakfar; Shane Eli Abrahams; Tayler Buono; Victoria Justice	None	2020	
"Tripped" †	None	Grant Knoche; Tayler Buono; Victoria Justice	None	2024	
"You're the Reason" †	Victorious cast	Michael Corcoran; CJ Abraham; Dan Schneider	Victorious: Music from the Hit TV Show	2011	

=== Unreleased ===
Song	Other performer	Writer(s)	Ref.
"26 Letters"	None	Toby Gad; Edwin Serrano; Victoria Justice	
"Ain't Nobody Else"	None	Jeff Halavacs; Jacob Kasher Hindlin; David Hodges; Victoria Justice	
"Albert's Science Rap Remix"	None	Kirsten Smith	
"Beautiful Day"	None	Martin Johnson; Victoria Justice	
"Better Days"	None	Jason Evigan; Victoria Justice; Julia Michaels; Mitch Allan	
"Better Than You"	None	Livvi Franc; Victoria Justice; Shelly Peiken; Fraser Lance Thorneycroft-Smith	
"Caught Up in You"	None	Evan Bogart; Victoria Justice; Lindy Robbins; Fraser Lance Thorneycroft-Smith	
"Cool"	None	Klara Elias; Alma Goodman; Victoria Justice; Cameron Montgomery	
"Cotton Candy Clouds"	None	William Spencer Bastian; Paris O'Neill Carney; Victoria Justice; Jintae Ko	
"F.U.N."	None	Toby Gad; Edwin Serrano; Victoria Justice	
"Firefly"	None	Toby Gad; Victoria Justice	
"Happy Without Me"	None	Maggie Chapman; Victoria Justice; Cameron Montgomery	
"Life Is Good"	None	Susan Florea Cagle; Michael Corcoran; Toby Gad; Lindy Robbins	
"Not Somebody Else"	None	Michèle Vice-Maslin; Larry Treadwell; Jessica Frith	
"Our Little Secret"	None	Victoria Justice; Makeba Ronnie Riddick; Greg Wells	
"The Outskirts"	None	Suzanne Wrubel; Dominique Ferrari; Peter Hutchings; Spencer David Hutchings	
"Priceless"	None	Jonas Jeberg; Victoria Justice; Julia Michaels	
"Reach for the Stars"	Eden Sher	Victoria Justice; Eden Sher	
"Real"	None	Victoria Justice; Lindy Robbins; Louis Schoorl	
"Rollercoaster"	None	Toby Gad; Victoria Justice; Lindy Robbins	
"Solo"	None	Victoria Justice; Lindy Robbins; Fraser Lance Thorneycroft-Smith	

== See also ==
- Victoria Justice discography
