= Countdown (Victorious song) =

Single by Victorious cast featuring Leon Thomas III and Victoria Justice

from the EP Victorious 2.0: More Music from the Hit TV Show
- Released: February 18, 2012
- Length: 3:27
- Label: Nickelodeon; Columbia
- Songwriters: Leon Thomas III; Kool Kojak; Travis Garland
- Producer: Kool Kojak

Victorious singles chronology
"You're the Reason" (2011)	"Countdown" (2012)	"Take a Hint" (2012)

Leon Thomas III singles chronology
"Countdown" (2012)	"Hello How Are You" (2013)

Victoria Justice singles chronology
"You're the Reason" (2011)	"Countdown" (2012)	"Take a Hint" (2012)

"Countdown" is a song performed by the Victorious cast featuring American singers Leon Thomas III and Victoria Justice from the show's debut extended play (EP), Victorious 2.0: More Music from the Hit TV Show (2012). The track was released as the EP's first single on February 18, 2012, through Columbia Records and Nickelodeon Records. The song also appeared in a Victorious episode titled "Andre's Horrible Girl" the same day as the single's release.

"Countdown" is an upbeat track that was written by Thomas, Travis Garland, and Kool Kojak, with production handled solely by the latter. The song received positive reviews from music critics, with some calling it catchy. Commercially, it peaked at number 10 on the Billboard Kid Digital Song Sales chart in the United States.

== Background and release ==
On February 2, 2012, Victorious actor Leon Thomas III revealed to MTV News that he would be performing a song he wrote titled "Countdown" alongside Victoria Justice in a Victorious episode. Thomas spoke positively about working with Justice, noting that he enjoyed singing with her while emphasizing how their voices complemented one another. He further expressed interest in releasing more music, noting that he had been working in the studio and wished to compete with artists like Bruno Mars, Adele, and B.o.B.

The cover art for "Countdown" was later revealed by the entertainment website Celebuzz on February 9, 2012. The song was officially released on February 18, 2012. The track was also featured in a Victorious episode titled "Andre's Horrible Girl", which aired the same day as the single's release. In the episode, Tori (Justice) starts to see her friend Andre (Thomas) act differently after noticing that his new girlfriend is controlling of him. The song was later released as the fifth track on the show's debut extended play (EP) Victorious 2.0: More Music from the Hit TV Show on June 5, 2012.

== Composition ==
"Countdown" is an upbeat track. The song features vocals from Justice and Thomas, with the latter also contributing writing and acoustic guitar, while Kool Kojak co-wrote and produced the track, as well as adding guitar, programming, synthesizer, bongos, and tambourine. Additional writing was provided by Travis Garland. The song was engineered by Peter Grigg, while recording was done by Michael Corcoran, mixing by Miles Walker, and mastering by Brian Gardner, with assistance from Ava Sebastian James and Eric Bisgyer.

== Reception ==
In a reader poll conducted by the joint website of Bop and Tiger Beat, they gave a positive review of the song, describing it as "one that we're totally jamming to lately". Sarah Chazan of AOL Music labeled "Countdown" as a "fun, upbeat track". The staff of M Magazine described the track as "so catchy" and stated that they "love it". The staff of Kidzworld called the track "infectious", while Jessica Dawson for Common Sense Media said that it was a "fave" among the show's fans. Writing for MovieWeb, Israel Olorunnisola praised Justice and Thomas's performance of the song in the series, stating that they "know how to make a crowd come alive". Commercially, "Countdown" debuted and peaked at number 10 on the Billboard Kid Digital Song Sales chart in March 2012 in the United States.

== Personnel ==
Credits are adapted from Tidal.

- Victoria Justice – vocals
- Leon Thomas III – vocals, writer, acoustic guitar
- Kool Kojak – writer, producer, guitar, programmer, synthesizer, bongos, tambourine
- Travis Garland – writer
- Peter Grigg – engineer
- Michael Corcoran – recording engineer
- Miles Walker – mixing engineer
- Brian Gardner – mastering engineer
- Ava Sebastian James – assistant engineer
- Eric Bisgyer – assistant engineer

== Charts ==
Weekly chart performance
Chart (2012)	Peak position
US Kid Digital Song Sales (Billboard)	10
