= Make It in America =

Single by Victorious cast featuring Victoria Justice

from the EP Victorious 2.0: More Music from the Hit TV Show
- Released: May 15, 2012
- Genre: Pop; pop rock; country pop
- Length: 3:20
- Label: Nickelodeon; Columbia
- Songwriters: Martin Johnson; Victoria Justice
- Producer: Martin Johnson

Victorious singles chronology
"Take a Hint" (2012)	"Make It in America" (2012)

Victoria Justice singles chronology
"Take a Hint" (2012)	"Make It in America" (2012)	"Gold" (2013)

Music video
- "Make It in America" on YouTube

"Make It in America" is a song performed by the Victorious cast featuring American actress and singer Victoria Justice from the show's debut extended play (EP), Victorious 2.0: More Music from the Hit TV Show (2012). Justice co-wrote the song with its producer Martin Johnson. The track was released as the extended play's third and final single on May 15, 2012, through Columbia Records in association with Nickelodeon. The song was featured in the show, where Tori Vega (Justice) performs it during a major award show.

Musically, "Make It in America" is an upbeat pop, pop rock, and country pop track with lyrics about a person following after their dreams. The song received generally positive reviews from critics, who mostly praised its catchiness. It peaked at number one on the US Kid Digital Song Sales chart. An accompanying music video was released in 2012 and portrays Justice and the Victorious cast driving through Los Angeles. Justice performed the track live on The Ellen DeGeneres Show in May 2012.

== Background and release ==
In February 2012, actress and singer Victoria Justice revealed during an interview with Celebuzz that she had written a song for the show and expressed her excitement for fans to hear it. "Make It in America" was first released as a single on May 15, 2012, through Columbia Records in association with Nickelodeon. The song then appeared on the American Nickelodeon television sitcom Victorious on May 19 in a one-hour special titled "Tori Goes Platinum". In the episode, a famous music producer selects Tori Vega (Justice) to perform an opening song for a major award show, but only under the condition that he can completely revamp her image. She performs "Make It in America" during the episode. It was added as the first track to the show's first extended play (EP) Victorious 2.0: More Music from the Hit TV Show on June 5, 2012. The song was released as a single in Australia to radio airplay on November 1, 2012, and digital download on November 9 by Sony Music Australia ahead of a press and promotional tour from Justice scheduled in the country for that month.

== Composition and lyrics ==
Justice provides the lead vocals and is credited as a writer on the track. Martin Johnson contributes background vocals and also serves as a writer, producer, and programmer. Martin added acoustic guitar, electric guitar, and percussion, with Jon Keefe on drums. The track was mastered by Stephen Marcussen and mixed by Miles Walker. Engineering and programming were handled by Kyle Moorman, with Eric Bisgyer serving as assistant engineer on "Make It in America".

Justice explained in an interview that she was inspired to write "Make It in America" after hearing her mother on the phone talking about someone "breaking big and making it in America", a phrase that stuck with her and inspired the song's title, which she felt carried a powerful message. She stated in another interview that the track was "a song that I'm very proud of". Music critics have described "Make It in America" as an upbeat pop, pop rock, and country pop track. The track has lyrics centered on a person dreaming about success in the movie industry while encouraging others to work hard to follow their goals and chase after their dreams.

== Reception ==
"Make It in America" was met with positive reviews from music critics. Alyssa Melillo for the Long Island Press opined that "Make It in America" was one of the songs that "set an energetic high bar for the show". Michelle of Twist called the track a "hot new song". The staff of J-14 declared "Make It in America" was a "sure-to-be hit song". The joint website of Bop and Tiger Beat gave a positive review of the track, deeming it as "pretty powerful" while stating that they are "absolutely loving" the song. Heather Phares, writing for AllMusic, commended "Make It in America", stating that Justice's "commanding vocals are the main attraction". Jessica Dawson for Common Sense Media commented that the song is a "fresh break from the usual cookie-cutter synth-pop, and even shows that Justice's voice is well suited for another genre".

The staff of Perez Hilton.com labeled the track as "summery" and stated that it "would make a great addition to a road trip playlist". Writing for MovieWeb, Israel Olorunnisola placed "Make It in America" at number ten on his "Victorious: 10 Songs You Forgot Were Awesome" list, describing it as a "gem" and mentioning that the song's "catchy chorus and upbeat melody makes it a track not to dismiss". Olorunnisola opined the track "showcases Justice's vocal abilities and proves her versatility as an artist". Megan Gaertner and Allison Kane for Her Campus placed the song at number five on their "The Best Songs from Victorious" list, describing "Make It in America" as "really sweet" while also calling it "really nice and heartwarming". Commercially, "Make It in America" peaked at number one on the US Kid Digital Song Sales chart.

== Promotion ==
A music video for "Make It in America" was first released in May 2012 on Nickelodeon. The video was later uploaded to the official Victorious YouTube channel on September 20, 2012. The music video features Justice and the Victorious cast driving in a convertible through Los Angeles, making stops at numerous landmarks, including the Hollywood Walk of Fame and Griffith Observatory. The staff of M Magazine described the music video as "super-summery". Justice performed the song live on The Ellen DeGeneres Show in May 2012, and also sang it during her first solo tour in the United States in late 2012.

== Credits and personnel ==
Credits adapted from Tidal.

- Victoria Justice – vocals, writer
- Martin Johnson – background vocals, writer, producer, programmer, acoustic guitar, electric guitar, percussion
- Stephen Marcussen – mastering engineer
- Miles Walker – mixing engineer
- Kyle Morrman – engineer, programmer
- Eric Bisgyer – assistant engineer
- Jon Keefe – drums

== Charts ==
Chart (2012)	Peak position
US Kid Digital Song Sales (Billboard)	1

== Release history ==
Release dates and formats for "Make It in America"
Region	Date	Format	Label	Ref.
Various	May 15, 2012	Digital download	Columbia	
Australia	November 1, 2012	Radio airplay	Sony	
Australia	November 9, 2012	Digital download	Sony	
