= Take a Hint =

Single by Victorious cast featuring Victoria Justice and Elizabeth Gillies

from the EP Victorious 2.0: More Music from the Hit TV Show
- Released: March 3, 2012
- Genre: Pop; electropop; dance-pop; EDM
- Length: 2:34
- Label: Nickelodeon; Columbia
- Songwriters: Meghan Kabir; Kevin Kadish; James Michael
- Producer: James Michael

Victorious singles chronology
"Countdown" (2012)	"Take a Hint" (2012)	"Make It in America" (2012)

Victoria Justice singles chronology
"Countdown" (2012)	"Take a Hint" (2012)	"Make It in America" (2012)

Elizabeth Gillies singles chronology
"Take a Hint" (2012)	"Santa Baby" (2013)

"Take a Hint" is a song that was performed by the cast of the American teen sitcom Victorious, which includes American actresses and singers Victoria Justice and Elizabeth Gillies. The song appears on the show's debut extended play (EP) Victorious 2.0: More Music from the Hit TV Show (2012), and was released through Columbia Records in association with Nickelodeon as the EP's second single on March 3, 2012. The song also appears in the Victorious episode titled "Tori & Jade's Play Date", which debuted the same day as the single's release, and features Tori Vega (Justice) and Jade West (Gillies) singing the song when two boys flirt with them.

The song is classified as pop, electropop, dance-pop, and EDM, and its lyrics are about the right to reject unwanted advances. Music critics gave "Take a Hint" positive reviews, and some praised its lyrics and melody. The song peaked at number eight on the US Billboard Bubbling Under Hot 100 chart and entered digital charts in the United States. The Recording Industry Association of America (RIAA) certified the song platinum in the United States and the British Phonographic Industry (BPI) certified it silver in the United Kingdom. Justice performed the song live throughout 2012 and Matt Bennett performed it live with Gillies in 2022.

== Background and release ==
"Take a Hint" was originally performed by Meghan Kabir, who wrote it with Kevin Kadish and its producer James Michael. Kabir changed some of the lyrics to make it more acceptable to Nickelodeon. The cast of the American teen sitcom Victorious, which includes Victoria Justice and Elizabeth Gillies, performed "Take a Hint", and it was released as a single through Nickelodeon Records and Columbia Records Records on March 3, 2012, The track was added on the show's debut extended play (EP) Victorious 2.0: More Music from the Hit TV Show on June 5, 2012.

"Take a Hint" was debuted in the show's third-season episode "Tori & Jade's Play Date" on the same day as its single release. In the episode, Tori Vega (Justice) and Jade West (Gillies) are forced to play a married couple onstage. Their teacher, Erwin Sikowitz (Eric Lange), becomes frustrated when Tori and Jade continuously argue, and tells them to patronize a karaoke restaurant. When two boys start flirting with them at the restaurant, Tori and Jade reject their advances as they sing "Take a Hint" together. Music critics have described "Take a Hint" as a pop, electropop, dance-pop, and EDM track. The song's lyrics are about the right to consent and defending oneself from unwelcome advances, and includes the lines: "No you can't buy me a drink / Let me tell you what I think / I think you could use a mint".

== Critical reception ==
Professional ratings
Review scores
Source	Rating
Common Sense Media	3/5 stars

Jessica Dawson for Common Sense Media gave "Take a Hint" three stars out of five, called it "harmless and humorous", and said it is "fun and meant to be lighthearted". She thought that the track's "overall message might be a little mature for young tween fans who watch the show", noting its use of innuendo and implicit profanity. Autumn McAlpin, writing for The Orange County Register, called the song an "anti-creepy-boy tune". Jack Irvin of People magazine described it as "memorable", while Haley Longman of Teen.com called the track "cute". Sara, writing for Twist magazine, described the song as "awesome", writing that it will get "stuck in your head". Casey Epstein-Gross of Paste stated it "was my absolute favorite even as a kid", and said: "living in the hellscape that is the age of performative men, Kabir's words have never felt more apt".

The staff of M Magazine called "Take a Hint" "so catchy". The joint website of Bop and Tiger Beat called it a "totally cute and catchy song that you'll absolutely love". Alyssa Melillo for the Long Island Press opined that the song was one of the songs that "set an energetic high bar for the show". Tiara B, writing for The Shade Room, put "Take a Hint" at number seven on her list of "Victorious: The Top 10 Songs That Still Have Us Hooked", calling it a "powerful duet". Writing for MovieWeb, Israel Olorunnisola placed "Take a Hint" at number four on his list of "Victorious: 10 Songs You Forgot Were Awesome", saying it has a "catchy melody" and "witty and empowering lyrics".< For Her Campus, Megan Gaertner and Allison Kane placed the song at number one on their list of "the Best Songs from Victorious", describing the track as a "complete bop" that introduced them to feminism.

== Commercial performance ==
"Take a Hint" peaked at number eight on the US Billboard Bubbling Under Hot 100 chart in March 2012, staying two weeks on the chart. It also peaked at number one on the US Kid Digital Song Sales chart, number 27 on the US Pop Digital Song Sales chart, and number 60 on the US Digital Song Sales chart. The song ranked at number three on the 2012 Kid Digital Song Sales year-end chart. In December 2022, "Take a Hint" surpassed 100 million streams on Spotify, becoming Justice's first track and Gillies's second to reach this milestone.

On January 5, 2022, the Recording Industry Association of America (RIAA) certified "Take a Hint" platinum by for selling 1,000,000 certified units in the United States. It became the first track from Victorious to be certified platinum in the United States and the second song featured on the show to earn an RIAA certification, following "Freak the Freak Out", which was certified gold. In 2023, the British Phonographic Industry (BPI) certified "Take a Hint" silver in the United Kingdom for selling 200,000 certified units.

== Live performances ==
To promote "Take a Hint", Justice performed the song live at the Pacific Amphitheatre in August 2012, and the following month at the Great Allentown Fair. In 2022, fellow Victorious actor Matt Bennett performed "Take a Hint" live with Gillies during some of his DJ concert sets.

== Charts ==
=== Weekly charts ===
Chart (2012)	Peak position
US Bubbling Under Hot 100 (Billboard)	8
US Digital Song Sales (Billboard)	60
US Kid Digital Song Sales (Billboard)	1
US Pop Digital Song Sales (Billboard)	27

=== Year-end charts ===
Chart (2012)	Position
US Kid Digital Song Sales (Billboard)	3

== Certifications ==
Certifications and sales
Region	Certification	Certified units/sales
United Kingdom (BPI)	Silver	200,000^{‡}
United States (RIAA)	Platinum	1,000,000^{‡}
^{‡} Sales+streaming figures based on certification alone.

== Credits and personnel ==
Credits adapted from Tidal.

- Victoria Justice – vocals
- Elizabeth Gillies – vocals
- Shahnaz – background vocals
- James Michael – songwriter, producer, recording engineer
- Kevin Kadish – songwriter
- Meghan Kabir – songwriter
- Michael Corcoran – engineer
- Brian Gardner – mastering engineer
- Miles Walker – mixing engineer
- Eric Bisgyer – assistant engineer
