= Treat Myself (disambiguation) =

Treat Myself may refer to:

- Treat Myself, 2020 album by Meghan Trainor
  - "Treat Myself", the title track of Treat Myself by Meghan Trainor, 2018
- "Treat Myself" (song), 2020 song by Victoria Justice
- "Treat Myself", a song by Stevie Wonder from Conversation Peace, 1995
