= I Think You're Swell =

"(I Think You're) Swell"

Song by Matt Bennett

from the EP Warm Fuzzies Vol. 1
- Released: May 20, 2012
- Length: 3:46
- Songwriter: Matt Bennett
- Producer: B. Charles

"(I Think You're) Swell" (also written as "I Think You're Swell") is a song by American actor and DJ Matt Bennett. The song was originally included on his debut extended play (EP), Warm Fuzzies Vol. 1, released exclusively on Bandcamp on May 20, 2012. A different version of the song was performed in a Victorious episode titled "The Blonde Squad", which was later released on the iTunes edition of Victorious 2.0: More Music from the Hit TV Show, the show's debut EP on June 5, 2012. The track was written by Bennett and produced by B. Charles. It is a ballad with lyrics mentioning pop culture references.

== Release ==
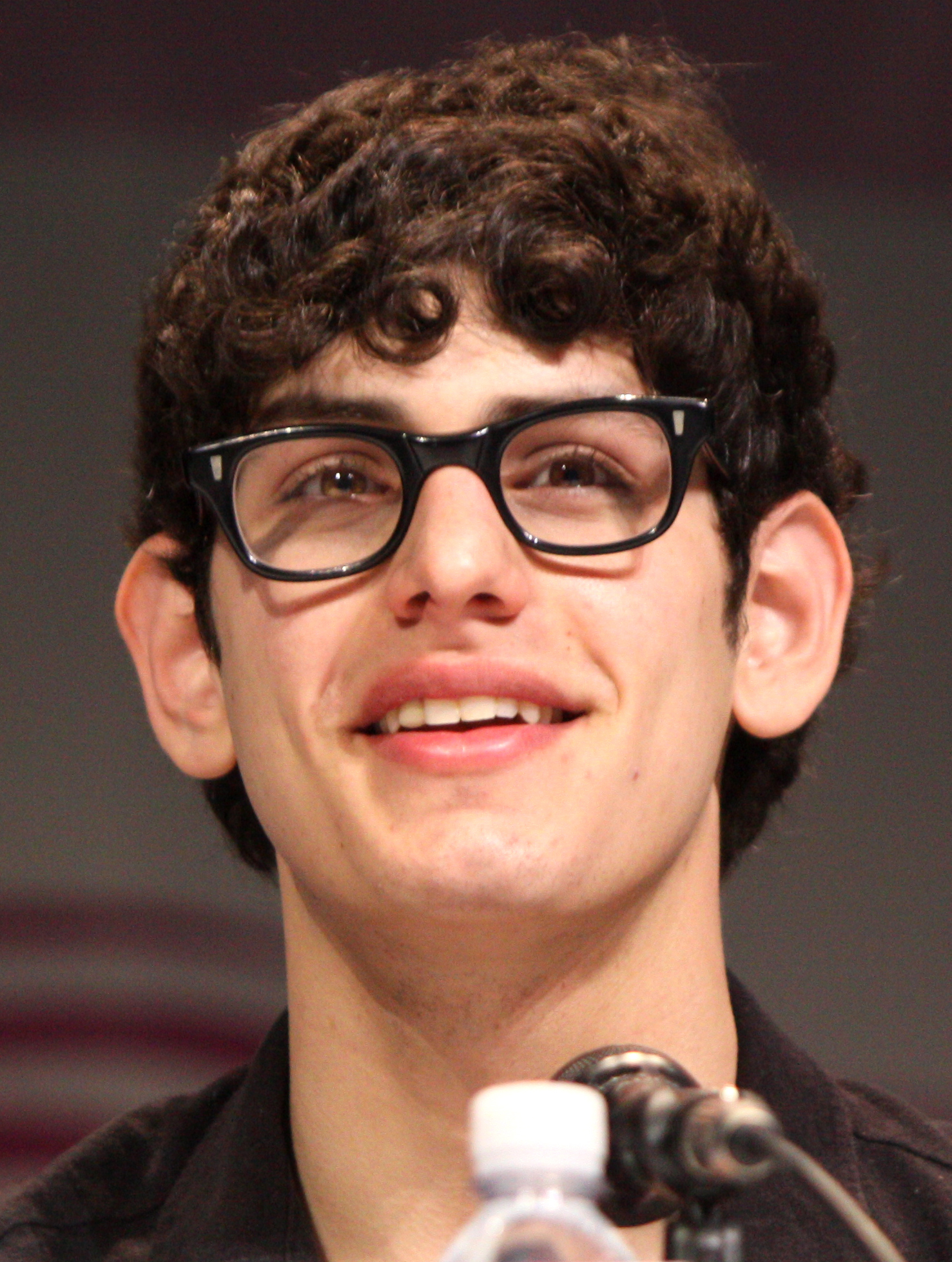
The track was written and features vocals by Matt Bennett (pictured in 2013).

On May 20, 2012, Matt Bennett released his debut extended play (EP), Warm Fuzzies Vol. 1, as an independent artist exclusively on the music platform Bandcamp. The record featured the song "(I Think You're) Swell" as the opening track. Bennett later re-recorded the song for the Nickelodeon television sitcom Victorious, in which he played Robbie Shapiro as part of the main cast. It was featured in the episode "The Blonde Squad", where Robbie (Bennett) performs the song for Cat Valentine (Ariana Grande) after she is dumped by a boy who admits he prefers to date blonde girls. The track was then exclusively released on iTunes as the final track to the show's first EP Victorious 2.0: More Music from the Hit TV Show on June 5, 2012, through Nickelodeon Records and Columbia Records.

== Music and lyrics ==
"I Think You're Swell" was written by Bennett and features him on vocals. Production was handled by B. Charles, with Stephen Marcussen serving as the mastering engineer. Mixing and editing were done by Tommy Dickinson, while Kenny Meriedeth contributed as both engineer and guitarist. Additional engineering was done by Mike Getches. In an interview with Northern Transmissions, Bennett stated that the lyrics in "I Think You're Swell" are a "love song in the form of a laundry list of pop culture references", with the lines: "I'll be the Jagger to your Richards, the Captain Kirk to your Picard ... You're more fun than Frisbee in the park and popping edamame." Deb Taylor for Suggest and Sade Spence of Elite Daily described "I Think You're Swell" as a ballad.

== Reception and live performances ==
Stacey Grant, writing for Seventeen magazine, described "I Think You're Swell" as a "beloved song", stating that it was "perfect fodder" for Cat and Robbie's relationship. Writing for BuzzFeed, Ehis Osifo praised the track, stating "my heart can't handle this". Jessica Dawson for Common Sense Media declared it as "clever and cute", opining that it has "charming lyrics". The staff of Capital called it "the most adorable track", while the staff of Kidzworld labeled "I Think You're Swell" as a "special bonus song".

On November 19, 2019, Grande invited Bennett on stage at the State Farm Arena during her Sweetener World Tour. Bennett played "I Think You're Swell" on guitar with Grande. Writing for Elle magazine, Alyssa Bailey stated that "fans lost it" when Bennett performed the track.

== Personnel ==
Credits adapted from Apple Music.

- Matt Bennett – vocals, writer
- B. Charles – producer
- Stephen Marcussen – mastering engineer
- Tommy Dickinson – mixing engineer, editing engineer
- Kenny Meriedeth – engineer, guitar
- Mike Getches – engineer
