= Victorious 2.0: More Music from the Hit TV Show =

EP by Victorious cast featuring Victoria Justice
- Released: June 5, 2012
- Genres: Pop; dance
- Length: 18:22
- Labels: Nickelodeon; Columbia
- Producers: Backhouse Mike; B. Charles; Eric Goldman; Martin Johnson; Kool Kojak; James Michael

Victorious cast and Victoria Justice chronology
Victorious: Music from the Hit TV Show (2011)	Victorious 2.0: More Music from the Hit TV Show (2012)	Victorious 3.0: Even More Music from the Hit TV Show (2012)

Singles from Victorious 2.0
- 1. "Countdown" Released: February 18, 2012; 2. "Take a Hint" Released: March 3, 2012; 3. "Make It in America" Released: May 15, 2012

Victorious 2.0: More Music from the Hit TV Show is the debut extended play (EP) for the Nickelodeon television series Victorious, with songs performed by Victoria Justice and the Victorious cast. The extended play was released on June 5, 2012, by Nickelodeon Records, in association with Columbia. Victorious 2.0: More Music from the Hit TV Show is a pop and dance record with upbeat tracks.

The extended play peaked at number 18 on the US Billboard 200 and charted in the top five on the US Kid Albums and Soundtrack Albums charts. Three singles were released for the extended play. "Take a Hint", the extended play's second single, peaked at number eight on the US Billboard Bubbling Under Hot 100 chart. The singles "Countdown" and "Make It in America" charted within the top ten of the US Billboard Kid Digital Song Sales chart.

== Release ==
In March 2012, Victorious actress Victoria Justice announced during an interview with On Air with Ryan Seacrest that more music for the show was in development. In May 2012, entertainment website Celebuzz exclusively revealed the extended play's cover art, title, and a scheduled release date for June 2012. Victorious 2.0: More Music from the Hit TV Show was officially released for digital download and streaming on June 5, 2012, by Nickelodeon Records, in association with Columbia. The extended play was subsequently released digitally and physically in Australia by Sony Music Australia on November 9, 2012, ahead of a press and promotional tour from Justice scheduled in the country for that month.

== Music and composition ==
Victorious 2.0: More Music from the Hit TV Show is primarily a pop and dance record with upbeat tracks about dancing and having fun. The extended play opens with "Make It in America", an upbeat pop, pop rock, and country pop track. Lyrically, the song is about Justice's desire to achieve fame in the movie industry. "Take a Hint" is a pop, electropop, dance-pop, and EDM track with Justice and Elizabeth Gillies on vocals. The song's lyrics are about having the right to consent and standing up against unwanted advances.

The next track, "Shut Up and Dance", is a dance track that features Justice on lead vocals. "5 Fingaz to the Face" includes a group rap performance by Justice and the Victorious cast. "Countdown" is an upbeat track that features Justice and Leon Thomas III on vocals. The standard version of the extended play closes with a cover version of Simple Minds's 1985 single "Don't You (Forget About Me)", featuring Justice on lead vocals and background vocals from the Victorious cast. The iTunes version of the extended play concludes with "I Think You're Swell", a ballad mentioning pop culture references that features Matt Bennett on vocals.

== Singles ==
"Countdown" was released as the first single on February 18, 2012. The song peaked at number ten on the US Billboard Kid Digital Song Sales chart. "Take a Hint" was released as the second single from the extended play on March 3, 2012. It peaked at number eight on the US Billboard Bubbling Under Hot 100 chart. The song was certified platinum in the United States by the Recording Industry Association of America (RIAA) for selling over 1,000,000 certified units. It was also certified silver in the United Kingdom by the British Phonographic Industry (BPI) for selling 200,000 certified units.

"Make It in America" was released as the final single on May 15, 2012. It was later released as a single in Australia by Sony Music Australia to radio airplay on November 1, 2012, and digital download on November 9 of that year. A music video for the song was released in May 2012. The video features Justice and the Victorious cast driving through Los Angeles in a convertible. Justice promoted the song by performing it live on The Ellen DeGeneres Show in May 2012. The song peaked at number one on the US Billboard Kid Digital Song Sales chart.

=== Promotion ===
On June 9, 2012, Justice and the Victorious cast held an event at Universal Orlando, where they performed songs from the extended play, participated in a Q&A session with fans, and premiered an unreleased Victorious episode. On June 18, 2012, Justice attended a launch party in Los Angeles for the extended play at the Hard Rock Cafe. In June 2012, Justice announced her debut concert tour, the Make It in America Tour, would be starting later that year. The tour spanned 17 dates across the United States.

== Reception ==
Professional ratings
Review scores
Source	Rating
AllMusic	3.5/5 stars
Common Sense Media	3/5 stars
Kidzworld	3/5 stars

Victorious 2.0: More Music from the Hit TV Show was met with generally mixed reviews from music critics. Ashely Rose from Cambio described the tracks on the extended play as "awesome summertime jams", mentioning that they "totally can't wait" to "check out the new songs". Writing for Celebuzz, Mariah Haas gave Victorious 2.0: More Music from the Hit TV Show a positive review, calling it a "highly-anticipated album". The joint website of Bop and Tiger Beat labeled the extended play as "great". Kayla Chanthavisith, writing for Her Campus, declared that the extended play is an "absolute masterpiece". Mark Wedel of the Kalamazoo Gazette stated that Justice was "highlighted" in the extended play.

Marty Frazen of the Bucks County Courier Times wrote that Justice had "survived so far on the soundtrack albums from the TV Show, including Victorious 2.0". The staff of Kidzworld gave it three stars out of five. Jessica Dawson of Common Sense Media rated it three stars out of five, stating that it has "occasional attitude and snarky humor, but overall it's OK for tween fans of the show." She expressed that "although some fans might be disappointed by the album's short length", she commented that the "songs on it are a good mix of the humor, dance beats, and fun that make the show Victorious and its female star, Justice, a success". Heather Phares of AllMusic gave the extended play three and a half stars out of five, opining that "as on the first volume of the Victorious soundtrack, Justice's commanding vocals are the main attraction here". She stated the songs in it are "upbeat but not too slick".

=== Commercial performance ===
Victorious 2.0: More Music from the Hit TV Show debuted and peaked at number 18 on the US Billboard 200 chart with 17,000 copies sold. It also peaked at number 18 on the US Top Current Album Sales, number two on the US Soundtrack Albums chart, and number one on the US Kid Albums chart. Outside of the United States, the extended play charted at number 44 on the UK Compilation Albums chart and number 16 on the UK Soundtrack Albums chart in the United Kingdom.

== Track listing ==
All tracks are performed by Victorious cast, with featured artists noted.

Standard edition
No.	Title	Writer(s)	Producer(s)	Length
1.	"Make It in America" (featuring Victoria Justice)	Martin Johnson; Victoria Justice	Johnson	3:20
2.	"Take a Hint" (featuring Victoria Justice and Elizabeth Gillies)	Meghan Kabir; Kevin Kadish; James Michael	Michael	2:34
3.	"Shut Up and Dance" (featuring Victoria Justice)	Michael Corcoran; Eric Goldman; Lindy Robbins; Dan Schneider	Backhouse Mike; Goldman	2:56
4.	"5 Fingaz to the Face" (featuring Victoria Justice)	Corcoran; Goldman; Schneider	Backhouse Mike; Goldman	1:58
5.	"Countdown" (featuring Leon Thomas III and Victoria Justice)	Allan P Grigg; Leon Thomas III; Travis Garland	Kool Kojak	3:27
6.	"Don't You (Forget About Me)" (featuring Victoria Justice)	Keith Forsey; Steve Schiff	Backhouse Mike; Goldman	4:07
Total length:				18:22

iTunes Store
No.	Title	Writer(s)	Producer	Length
7.	"I Think You're Swell" (featuring Matt Bennett)	Matt Bennett	B. Charles	3:35
Total length:				21:57

== Charts ==
=== Weekly charts ===
Weekly chart performance for Victorious 2.0: More Music from the Hit TV Show
Chart (2012)	Peak position
UK Compilation Albums (Official Charts)	44
UK Soundtrack Albums (OCC)	16
US Billboard 200	18
US Kid Albums (Billboard)	1
US Soundtrack Albums (Billboard)	2

=== Year-end charts ===
Year-end chart performance for Victorious 2.0: More Music from the Hit TV Show
Chart (2012)	Position
US Kid Albums (Billboard)	17

== Release history ==
Release dates and formats for Victorious 2.0: More Music from the Hit TV Show
Region	Date	Format	Label	Ref.
Various	June 5, 2012	Digital download	Columbia	
Australia	November 9, 2012	Digital download; physical release	Sony	
