= Gold (Victoria Justice song) =

2013 single by Victoria Justice

Single by Victoria Justice
- B-side: "Shake"
- Released: June 18, 2013
- Recorded: 2013
- Genre: Pop
- Length: 3:13
- Label: Nickelodeon; Columbia
- Songwriters: Ben Camp; Jakob Jerlström; Jason Weiss; Ludvig Söderberg; Peter Thomas; Sam Shrieve; Tove Nilsson
- Producers: Peter Thomas; The Struts; Jason Weiss; Anne Preven

Victoria Justice singles chronology
"Make It in America" (2012)	"Gold" (2013)	"Treat Myself" (2020)

Music video
- "Gold" on YouTube

"Gold" is the debut solo single by American singer and actress Victoria Justice, released on June 18, 2013, by Nickelodeon Records and Columbia Records. The song was written by Tove Lo, Jason Weiss, Sam Shrieve, Ben Camp, Jakob Jerlström, Ludvig Söderberg, and Peter Thomas. It was originally intended as a lead single for Justice's planned debut studio album, which was scrapped due to reported creative differences.

== Background ==
Justice first initiated her music career on the Nickelodeon TV show Victorious. She recorded the series' first featured song "Make It Shine", which was also the show's theme song. Several other songs were featured in the series, including "You're the Reason", "Beggin' on Your Knees" and "Best Friend's Brother". Justice performed her debut official single, "Freak the Freak Out", during the Victorious special episode of the same name. In a 2010 interview with the Associated Press, she stated that she was recording an album but would take her time with the process, rather than rush it. In October 2012, she revealed she would release her debut album in 2013, stating "It's going to be pop".

On June 6, 2013, Justice described material from her album:

When you hear these songs...the people that know me are like, 'This is so Vic!' It's 100 percent my personality, messages I want to get across. Some of the songs are really fun, upbeat stuff you can dance to, and then I have some songs that are a little more introspective, a little more mellow. It's just all me, basically, so it's very cool.

She later commented on her album again: "'Gold' is more mainstream pop, and I wrote another song that I'm super excited about, and it's one of my favorites that I've ever written...I'm just exploring with a bunch of different sounds. It's been really fun getting to write most of my music."

The song was produced by the Swedish production team the Struts, along with Anne Preven, Jason Weiss, and Peter Thomas.

== Music video ==
Justice released an audio track for the song via her official YouTube account on June 18, 2013. The official music video for the song was directed by Chandler Lass and premiered on July 12, 2013. Colton Haynes flirts with Justice in glamorous scenes in the video.

== Live performances ==
"Gold", as well as "Shake", was a part of the setlist on Justice's second tour, Summer Break Tour (2013).

== Track listing ==
Digital single (stand-alone)

1. "Gold" – 3:13

Digital single (with B-side)

1. "Gold" – 3:13
2. "Shake" – 3:34

== Release history ==
Release dates and formats for "Gold"
Region	Date	Formats	Label	Ref.
United States	June 18, 2013	Digital download; streaming	Nickelodeon; Columbia	
France	March 27, 2019	Digital download; streaming	Nickelodeon; Columbia	
Germany	March 27, 2019	Digital download; streaming	Nickelodeon; Columbia	
Italy	March 27, 2019	Digital download; streaming	Nickelodeon; Columbia	
Japan	March 27, 2019	Digital download; streaming	Nickelodeon; Columbia	
Poland	March 27, 2019	Digital download; streaming	Nickelodeon; Columbia	
United Kingdom	March 27, 2019	Digital download; streaming	Nickelodeon; Columbia	
