= Elizabeth Gillies =

American actress and singer (b. 1993)

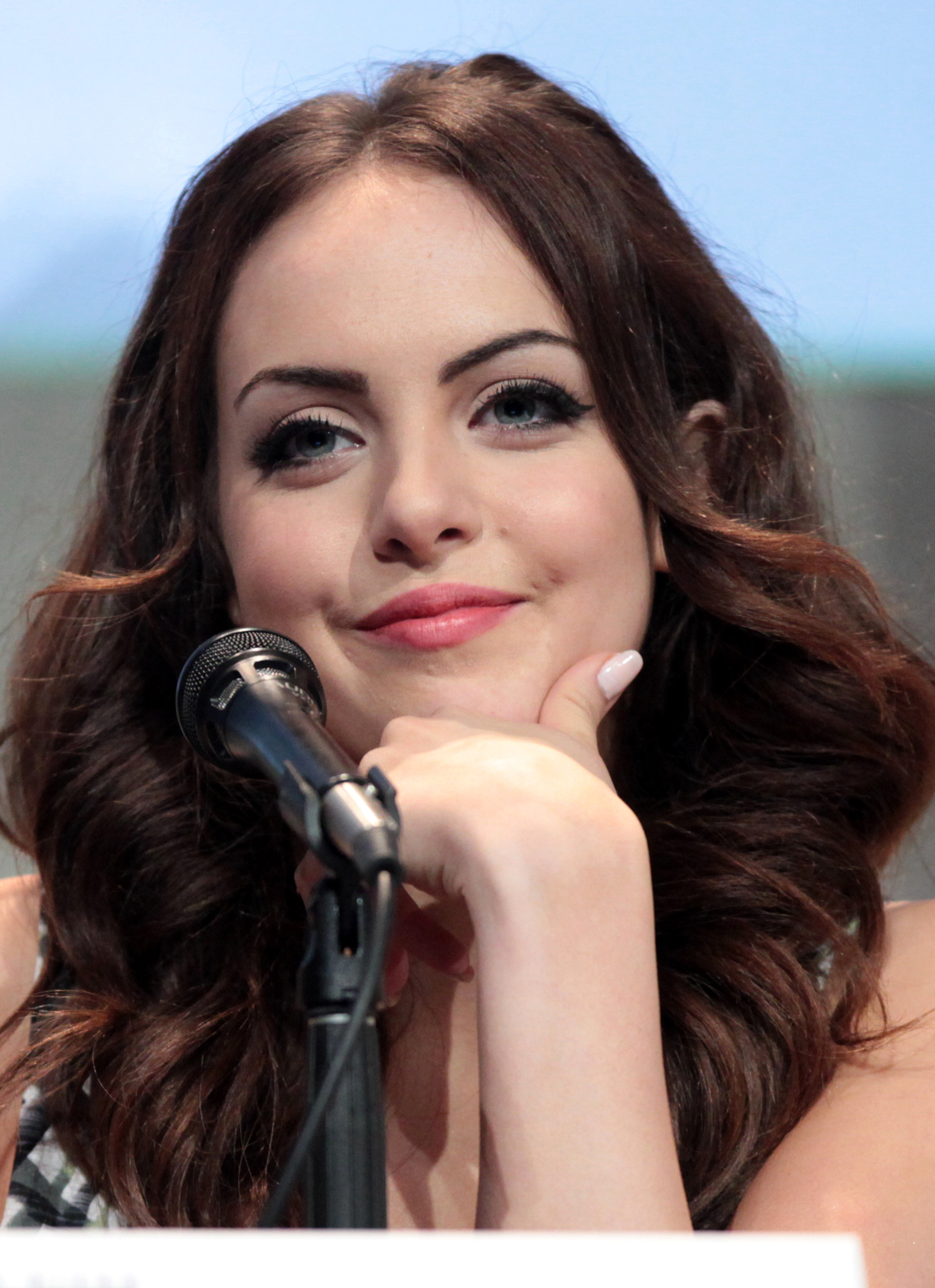
- Gillies at the 2015 San Diego Comic-Con
- Born: Elizabeth Egan Gillies; July 26, 1993 (age 33); Haworth, New Jersey, U.S.
- Other name: Liz Gillies
- Occupations: Actress; singer
- Years active: 2005–present
- Known for: Victorious (2010–2013); Dynasty (2017–2022)
- Spouse: Michael Corcoran (m. 2020)
- Musical career
- Genres: Traditional pop; jazz; swing; big band; rock
- Instrument: Vocals
- Labels: Republic; Verve; Nick

Elizabeth Egan Gillies (born July 26, 1993) is an American actress and singer. She began her acting career as a teenager and made her Broadway debut in the musical 13 (2008). She then received recognition for playing Jade West in the Nickelodeon series Victorious (2010–2013) and for voicing Daphne in Nickelodeon's revival of Winx Club (2011–2014). She was featured in the soundtrack album of Victorious, which appeared on the Billboard 200. She also covered "Santa Baby" (1953) with Ariana Grande in 2013.

She starred as the lead singer of a band in the FX comedy series Sex & Drugs & Rock & Roll (2015–2016), performing on two soundtracks for the show. She then led The CW reboot of Dynasty (2017–2022) as Fallon Carrington, and voiced the titular character in the animated film Catwoman: Hunted (2022).

Her collaboration with Seth MacFarlane resulted in the extended play Songs from Home (2021) and the Christmas studio album We Wish You the Merriest (2023). In 2025, Gillies returned to the stage in the Westside revival of the musical Little Shop of Horrors.

== Early life ==
Elizabeth Egan Gillies was born on July 26, 1993, in Haworth, New Jersey, to Dave and Lorraine "Lorrie" (née McCarthy) Gillies. She has one younger brother. Gillies has stated that she has Irish ancestry, and an Italian grandmother and great-grandmother. Her paternal grandfather, John Egan Gillies, fought in World War II.

She attended Northern Valley Regional High School at Demarest for her freshman year, but left to pursue acting and participated in an online high school program.

== Career ==
=== 2005–2009: Early work and Broadway debut ===
Gillies' acting career began at age 12 when she started going to local open casting calls. She quickly began appearing in commercials for companies such as Virgin Mobile. Gillies' first television role was as a recurring character in three episodes of The Black Donnellys.

In 2008, she played small roles in The Clique, Harold, and Locker 514. That year she was also cast as Lucy in a Goodspeed production of Jason Robert Brown's new musical 13, alongside her future Victorious co-star, Ariana Grande. Later that year, 13 moved to Broadway, which made it the first Broadway production to have a cast and band entirely made up of teenagers. Gillies remained with the production until its closure on January 4, 2009.

=== 2010–2013: Breakthrough with Nickelodeon and music ===
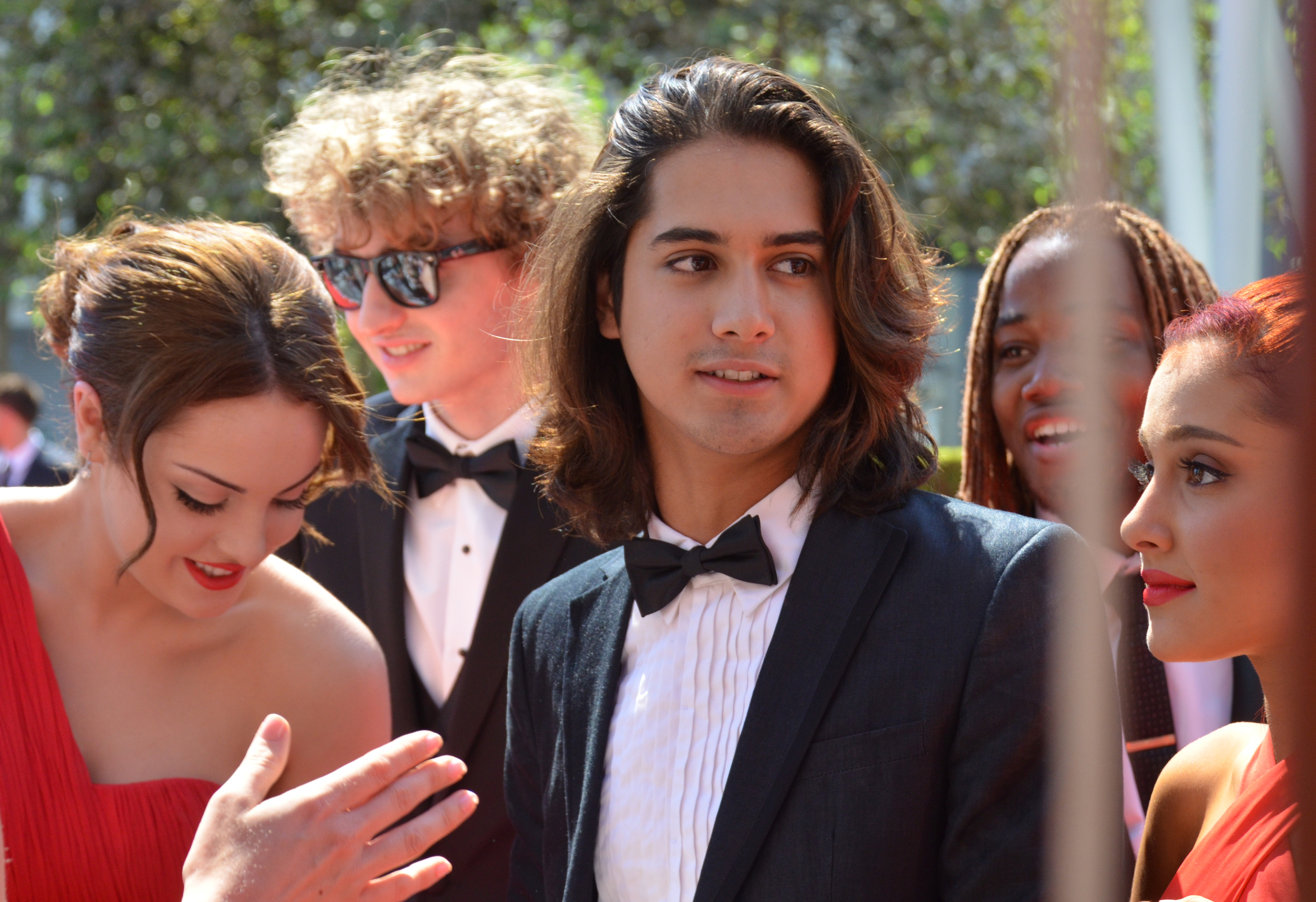
The cast of Victorious at the 64th Primetime Creative Arts Emmy Awards in 2012

In 2010, Gillies was cast as bad girl and occasional antagonist Jade West in the Nickelodeon television show Victorious, a sitcom revolving around teenagers at a performing arts high school in Hollywood, which marked her second time working alongside 13 co-star Grande. Regarding her Victorious character, Gillies said, "It's wonderful. I love playing Jade. I always say she's not so much the 'mean' girl, but the 'bad' girl in so many ways. She has a lot of human qualities to her—she's not just completely sociopathic. She's sweet with her boyfriend. It's nice to play a character with some depth."

Victorious premiered on March 27, 2010. During her time on Victorious, she performed on the soundtracks Victorious, Victorious 2.0, Victorious 3.0, most notably the songs "Give It Up" (duet with Grande), and "Take a Hint" (duet with Victoria Justice). The latter was the most successful commercially, earning Gillies her first platinum certification from the Recording Industry Association of America (RIAA) and silver certification from the British Phonographic Industry (BPI). She also wrote and recorded the song "You Don't Know Me" for an episode of Victorious, which was featured in Victorious 3.0.

For the network, Gillies voiced the character of Daphne on the Nickelodeon revival of Winx Club and recorded Winx Club's official song, "We Are Believix". She also appeared in an episode of Big Time Rush and as a contestant on BrainSurge and Figure It Out. Beginning in 2012, Gillies began playing small guest roles outside Nickelodeon. Notable appearances include White Collar and The Exes.

In July 2012, it was reported that Gillies was working on an alternative rock album. Victorious ended on February 2, 2013, after four seasons. That same year, she was cast as Courtney in the musical adaptation of Jawbreaker and participated in a reading of the show in Manhattan. The musical did not end up being taken to Broadway. On December 10, 2013, Gillies recorded a duet of "Santa Baby" with Grande for the latter's Christmas Kisses EP.

=== 2014–2019: Mainstream transition and Dynasty ===
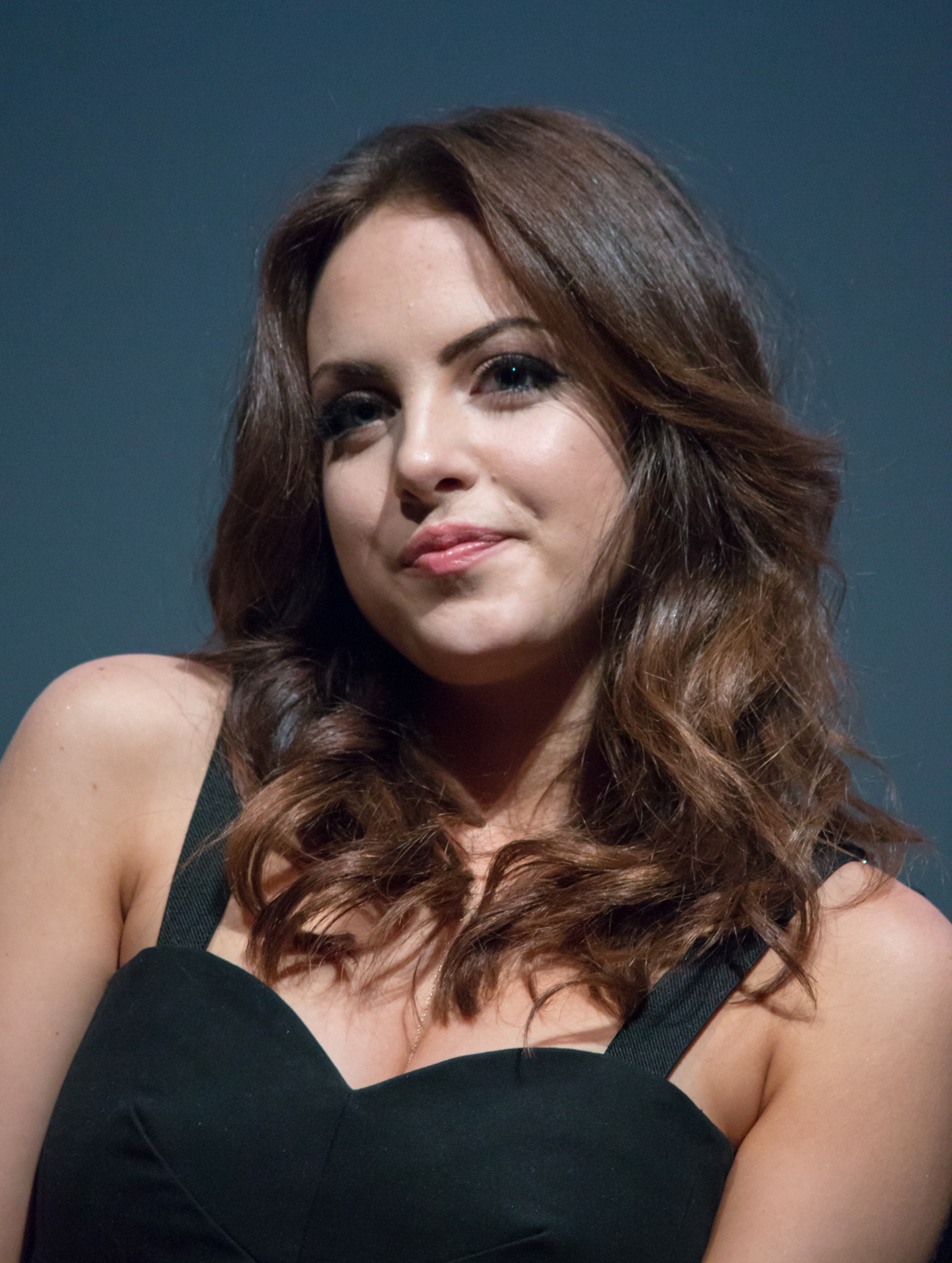
Gillies at an event promoting the show Sex & Drugs & Rock & Roll at the ATX TV Festival in 2015

In 2014, Gillies appeared in the horror film Animal as Mandy and the Lifetime movie Killing Daddy, playing Callie Ross. Animal was filmed in the summer of 2013 in Manchester, Connecticut, and was produced by Drew Barrymore. The film also features Gillies' former Winx Club co-star Keke Palmer and was released on June 17, 2014 to negative reviews.

In 2015, Gillies was cast as Heather in the remake of Vacation. The film received a wide release on July 29, 2015. She was then cast in the comedy series Sex & Drugs & Rock & Roll as Gigi, an aspiring singer and daughter of a former rock star named Johnny Rock (portrayed by the show's creator, Denis Leary). The show premiered on July 16, 2015, to mixed reviews, but Gillies' performance as Gigi was well received. On September 9, 2016, FX declined to renew the show for a third season, effectively canceling the series.

In 2017, Gillies was cast as Fallon Carrington in The CW television series Dynasty, a reboot of the 1980s series of the same name. After Nicollette Sheridan left the role of Fallon's mother, Alexis Carrington, near the end of the second season, Gillies began playing the character temporarily, as well as continuing to portray Fallon.

In 2018, Gillies starred in the dark-comedy thriller film Arizona as Kelsey. It was first premiered at the 2018 Sundance Film Festival, and later attained a theatrical release, as well as being released direct-to-video. The following year, Gillies, alongside Matt Bennett, made a surprise appearance during the November 19 show of her Victorious co-star Grande's Sweetener World Tour in Atlanta, in which Grande and Bennett performed "I Think You're Swell", while Grande and Gillies performed "Give It Up", both songs from Victorious.

=== 2020–present: Return to music and stage ===
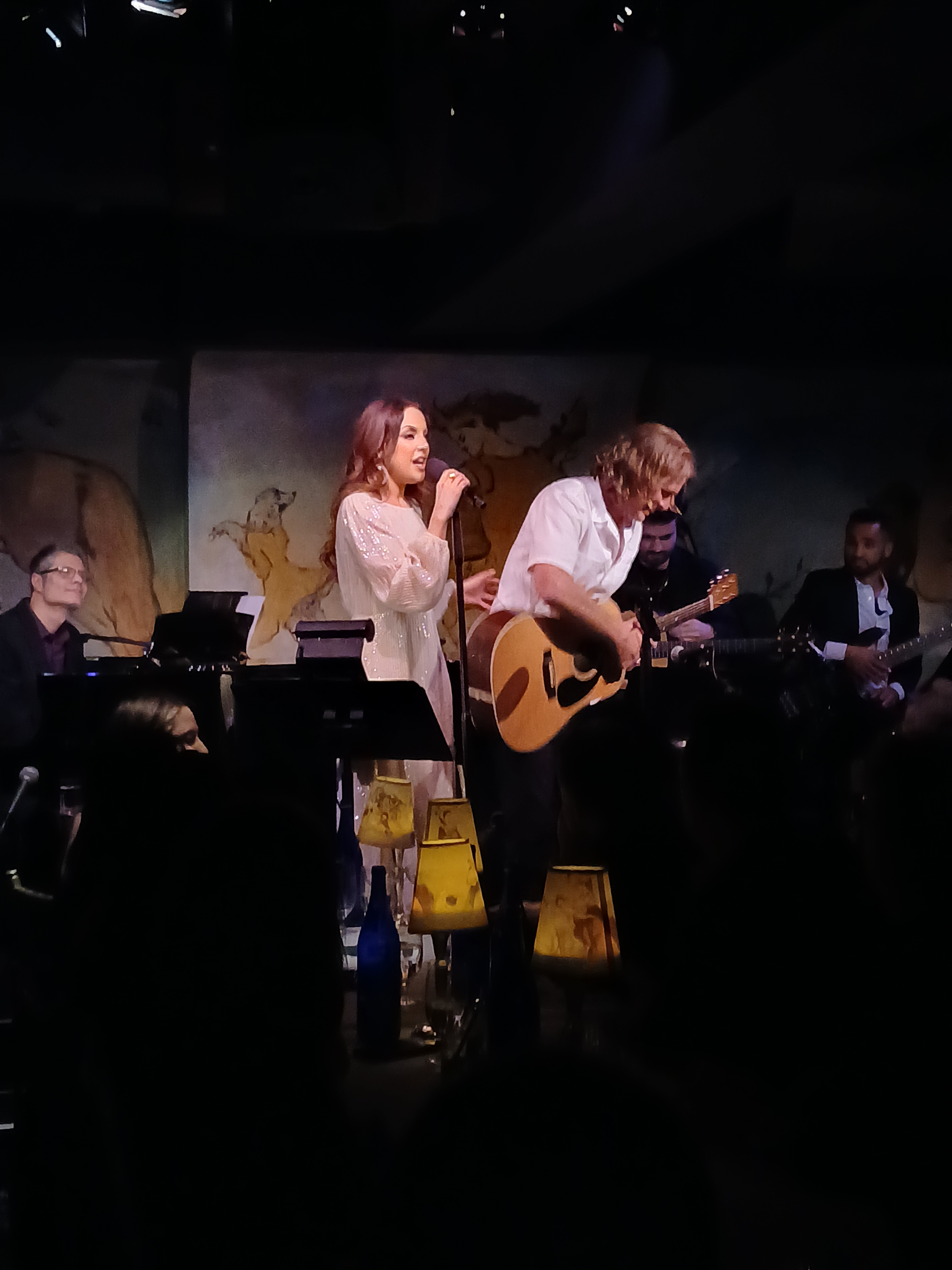
Gillies and Corcoran performing at the Cafe Carlyle in Manhattan, New York in 2025

In 2020, during the COVID-19 pandemic, Gillies collaborated with Seth MacFarlane on a series of songs, eight in total, on an extended play entitled Songs from Home released in 2021. Also in 2021, it was announced Gillies would voice the titular character in the 2022 animated feature film Catwoman: Hunted.

In 2023, Gillies released her debut studio album with Seth MacFarlane, titled We Wish You the Merriest. In February 2025, Gillies began starring as Audrey opposite Milo Manheim as Seymour in the long-running Off-Broadway revival of Little Shop of Horrors. Her run ended in July 2025 opposite Graham Phillips as Seymour.

== Personal life ==
Gillies met American music producer Michael Corcoran on the set of the Nickelodeon show Victorious. Corcoran co-wrote and produced the songs that Gillies sang on the show. The pair began dating in late 2012, when she was 19. On August 8, 2020, Gillies married Corcoran at a private ceremony in Chesterfield Township, New Jersey. They reside in Atlanta, Georgia.

== Filmography ==
=== Film ===
Year	Title	Role	Notes
2008	Harold	Evelyn Taylor	
2008	The Clique	Shelby Wexler	Direct-to-video film
2011	The Death and Return of Superman	Eradicator folks	Short film
2012	Winx Club: The Secret of the Lost Kingdom	Daphne	Voice role
2014	Animal	Mandy	
2015	Vacation	Heather	
2018	Arizona	Kelsey	
2019	15 Minutes at 400 Degrees	Crystal	Short film
2022	Catwoman: Hunted	Catwoman / Selina Kyle	Voice role
2024	Spread	Ruby Clark	Also executive producer

=== Television ===
Year	Title	Role	Notes
2007	The Black Donnellys	Young Jenny	Recurring role; 3 episodes
2009	The Battery's Down	Bat Mitzvah Guest	Episode: "Bad Bad News"
2010–2013	Victorious	Jade West	Main role; 56 episodes
2011	iCarly	Jade West	Episode: "iParty with Victorious"
2011	Big Time Rush	Heather Fox	Episode: "Big Time Secret"
2011–2014	Winx Club	Daphne / Lorie / Kanika	Voice role; 24 episodes
2012	White Collar	Chloe Woods	Episode: "Upper West Side Story"
2013	The Exes	Tracy Cooper	Episode: "Prelude to a Kiss"
2014	Sam & Cat	Jade West	Episode: "#TheKillerTunaJump: #Freddie #Jade #Robbie"
2014	Killing Daddy	Callie Ross	Television film
2015–2016	Sex & Drugs & Rock & Roll	Gigi Rock	Main role; 20 episodes
2015	The Penguins of Madagascar	Singer	Voice role; episode: "The Penguin Who Loved Me"
2015	American Dad!	Lena Horne	Voice role; episode: "A Star Is Reborn"
2017–2022	Dynasty	Fallon Carrington / Alexis Carrington (season 2)	Main role; 108 episodes
2018	Robot Chicken	Sun Baby / Marie "Slim" Browning	Voice role; episode: "Gimme That Chocolate Milk"
2019	Welcome to the Wayne	Parana Sycamore	Voice role; episode: "That's Squidjit Bowling"
2020	Make It Work!	Herself	Television special
2022	Family Guy	Alana Fitzgerald	Voice role; episode: "All About Alana"
2022	The Orville	Dinal	Episode: "Mortality Paradox"
2026	The Hunting Party	Amanda Weiss	Recurring role; 3 episodes (season 2)
TBA	The Right Side	Jordan Silver	Upcoming series

=== Theater ===
Year	Title	Role	Director	Venue	Notes
2008	13	Lucy	Jeremy Sams	Norma Terris Theatre	
2008	13	Lucy	Jeremy Sams	Bernard B. Jacobs Theatre	Original Broadway Cast
2008–2009	13	Lucy	Jeremy Sams	Bernard B. Jacobs Theatre	Original Broadway Cast
2013	Jawbreaker: The Musical	Courtney	Gabriel Barre		Workshop reading
2025	Little Shop of Horrors	Audrey	Michael Mayer	Westside Theatre	Off-Broadway
2026	Rope	Leila	Scott Elliott	Theatre at St. Clement's	Off-Broadway

== Discography ==
- We Wish You the Merriest (2023) (with Seth MacFarlane)

== Other productions ==
- Elizabeth Gillies at Café Carlyle (2025)
- We Chose to Go to the Moon (2026)
- Rodgers & Hart at Carnegie Hall (2026)
