= Twist (magazine) =

American teenage magazine

Twist is an online teen-focused website and was a monthly print teen magazine. The website is owned by, and the print magazine was published, by Bauer Publishing, the United States division of the German firm Bauer Verlagsgruppe. The first issue was released in 1997.

Bauer Media announced in November 2015 that the print edition of Twist magazine would end with the early 2016 issues, but that it would continue as an online-only venture. The Twist website stopped updating in 2017 and the website now redirects to J-14.

The magazine's headquarters is in Englewood Cliffs, New Jersey. Like the majority of teenage magazines, it contains common features including teen gossip, quizzes, fashion, popular celebrity couples, posters and more with celebrities of interest to the readers. Betsy Fast served as the editor-in-chief of the magazine.
