= Treat Myself (song) =

2020 single by Victoria Justice

Single by Victoria Justice
- Released: December 11, 2020
- Genre: Soft pop
- Length: 2:42
- Label: Self-released
- Songwriters: Victoria Justice; Jonny Pakfar; Shane Eli Abrahams; Tayler Buono
- Producer: Campfire

Victoria Justice singles chronology
"Gold" (2013)	"Treat Myself" (2020)	"Stay" (2021)

Music video
- "Treat Myself" on YouTube

"Treat Myself" is a song recorded by American singer Victoria Justice, released on December 11, 2020. It was written by Justice, Jonny Pakfar, Shane Eli Abrahams, and Tayler Buono. Marking her first musical release in seven years and her debut as an independent artist after her departure from Columbia Records, it's a soft pop song about self-discovery, mental health, overcoming anxiety, and battling negative inner dialogue.

== Background ==
Following the conclusion of her Nickelodeon sitcom Victorious (2010–2013), Justice launched her solo music career with Columbia Records and released her debut single "Gold". She initially intended to release her first studio album, describing it as a pop record, but announced in 2014 that she had left the label. Justice took a break from the music industry after starring in the 2016 film The Rocky Horror Picture Show: Let's Do the Time Warp Again and performing on its soundtrack.

On December 8, 2020, Justice announced her return to the music industry with the release of her first independent single "Treat Myself". She stated that she had hoped to release an album or extended play, but delayed her plans due to the COVID-19 pandemic.

== Composition ==
"Treat Myself" is a soft pop song. Inquisitr's Treva Bowdoin noted "real, raw" lyrics are about "the need to engage in some serious self-care".

== Critical reception ==
Billboard's Jason Lipshutz and Gab Ginsberg placed the song on the list of "10 cool new pop songs to get you through the week", calling the track "lovely" and adding it's "with its unfussy production, a good reminder of her vocal skill." Idolator's Mike Wass stated "her first single in seven years was worth the wait. 'Treat Myself' is a raw, emotional ballad with deeply relatable lyrics", adding that the song is "very good" at the end of the review. Elite Daily's Brendan Wetmore wrote the song "was the perfect single to kickstart her new venture into a full-time career as a pop star, and a perfect way to close out 2020", stating Justice's vocal is "perfectly suited for modern pop tropes, like soft guitar plucks and haunting choruses", comparing it to Olivia Rodrigo's hit single "Drivers License" released a month later.

== Music video ==
The music video for the song was released on December 16, 2020. It was directed by John Logsdon and Patrick Dwyer.
