= M Magazine =

American teen print magazine

- May 2014 issue featuring Jennette McCurdy, Olivia Holt, Dove Cameron, Ross Lynch, Selena Gomez, Niall Horan, Ariana Grande and Austin Mahone
- Categories: Teen magazine
- Frequency: Monthly
- Total circulation: 235,935 (2011)
- First issue: January 2000
- Final issue: 2016 (print), 2017 (online)
- Company: Bauer Publishing
- Country: United States
- Based in: Englewood Cliffs, New Jersey
- Language: English
- Website: www.m-magazine.com
- ISSN: 1533-9149

M Magazine was a monthly print teen magazine and website. It was published by Bauer Publishing, the United States division of the German firm Bauer Verlagsgruppe. The first issue was released in January 2000.

Bauer Media announced in November 2015 that the print edition of M Magazine would end with the early 2016 issues, but that it would continue as an online-only venture. The M Magazine website stopped updating in 2017 and the website now redirects to J-14.

== Profile ==
Like the majority of teenage magazines, it contains common features like teen gossip, quizzes, fashion, hot couples, posters and more with celebrities that are of interest to its readers. Many Disney, Nickelodeon and Pop music stars are usually the focus and on cover of the magazine.

An annual survey in 2007 by Experian Simmons Research of Fort Lauderdale, Florida, found that M Magazine tied among American girls 8 to 14 for familiarity, with nearly one in three girls in that age group surveyed saying they had read or looked at the magazine.

== Circulation ==
Circulation was 217,183 copies in 2006.
