= Victoria Justice =

American actress and singer (born 1993)

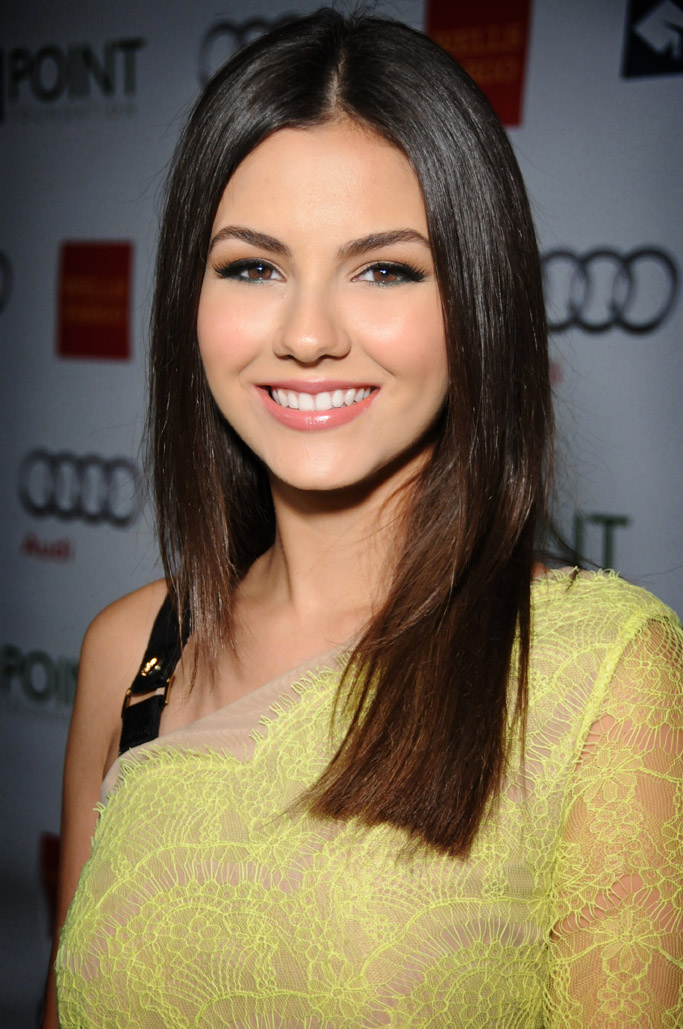
- Justice in 2013
- Born: February 19, 1993 (age 33); Hollywood, Florida, U.S.
- Occupations: Actress; singer
- Years active: 2003–present
- Works: Discography; songs recorded
- Musical career
- Genre: Pop
- Instrument: Vocals
- Labels: Nickelodeon; Columbia

Victoria Justice (born February 19, 1993) is an American actress and singer. She rose to fame on Nickelodeon, playing Lola Martinez on the comedy drama series Zoey 101 (2005–2008) and Tori Vega on the sitcom Victorious (2010–2013). For these roles, she won a Bravo Otto, a Kids' Choice Award, and two Young Artist Awards. She also starred in the musical Spectacular! (2009) and the comedy horror film The Boy Who Cried Werewolf (2010) for the network.

Justice began her music career recording songs for the soundtracks of her acting projects, including the Spectacular! soundtrack (2009). Her first commercial successes came with the Victorious soundtrack album and extended plays, all of which appeared on the Billboard 200. She then launched a solo career with Columbia Records and released her debut single "Gold" in 2013, but left the label that same year after reported creative differences.

Justice led the MTV thriller television series Eye Candy (2015). Her film appearances include the romantic comedy The First Time (2012), the teen comedy Fun Size (2012), the comedy drama Naomi and Ely's No Kiss List (2015), the teen comedy The Outcasts (2017), the romance drama Trust (2021), the supernatural comedy Afterlife of the Party (2021), the romantic comedy A Perfect Pairing (2022), and the psychological thriller The Tutor (2023). After a seven-year hiatus from music, she made her comeback with the single "Treat Myself" (2020).

== Early life ==
Victoria Justice is the daughter of Serene Reed and Zack Justice. Her father is of English, German, and Irish descent; her mother, originally from the Bronx, New York, is of Puerto Rican ancestry.

At the age of ten, Justice and her family moved to Los Angeles, California, settling in Hollywood. While filming Victorious, she attended Cleveland High School in Reseda, located in the San Fernando Valley of Los Angeles, before receiving her diploma through a home school program.

== Career ==
=== 2000s ===
In 2003, Justice began her acting career, making a guest appearance on the Gilmore Girls episode "The Hobbit, the Sofa and Digger Stiles". She portrayed Jill No. 2, a walk-on role. After her appearance in the series, her family ultimately moved to Los Angeles, and Justice began to pursue a career in acting more intently. The following year, she guest-starred on the second episode of the Disney Channel series The Suite Life of Zack & Cody, in which she played a young pageant contestant named Rebecca. Later, she was cast as Stella, a young girl who begins seeing visions of Mary Magdalene, in Aaron Ruell's 2005 short film Mary.

In 2005, Justice was accepted into the musical theatre program at the Millikan Performing Arts Academy in Los Angeles. She also appeared in several advertisements for companies such as Ralph Lauren, Gap, Guess, Mervyn's, Peanut Butter Toast Crunch cereal, and Ovaltine. That same year, Justice landed a leading role in the Nickelodeon series Zoey 101 as Lola Martinez, a new student who is also an aspiring actress. On landing the part, Justice said: "I was extremely happy; I was bouncing up and down and screaming. That was a really great moment." Justice's character was introduced during the second season, on September 11, 2005. She also made a cameo appearance in the film When Do We Eat? (2005). She played the role of Rose in the Hallmark Channel film Silver Bells, which became a Hallmark Hall of Fame film.

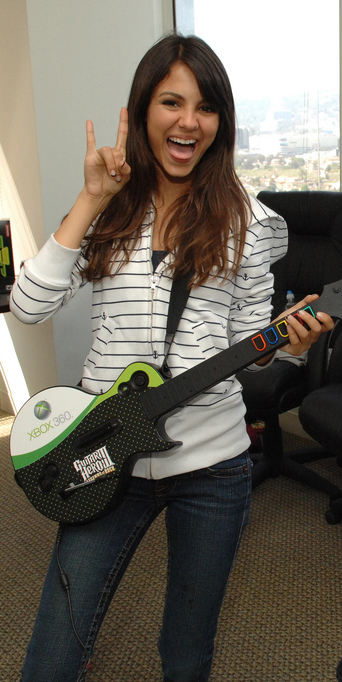
Justice in March 2008

In 2006, Justice made a guest appearance on an episode of Everwood in the episode "Enjoy the Ride". Also in 2006, she played the supporting role of Holly in the thriller film The Garden. Zoey 101 ended its run on May 2, 2008. In 2009, she announced plans to guest star on an episode of Nickelodeon's series The Naked Brothers Band. The TV special, titled Valentine Dream Date, featured Justice portraying herself. She did not record new music until 2009, when she starred in the Nickelodeon musical Spectacular!, in which she performed three songs. The film aired on Nickelodeon on February 16, 2009.

=== 2010s ===
After the success of The Naked Brothers Band special in which Justice guest starred, she appeared in another episode, "The Premiere", on April 11, 2009. She later appeared in episodes of iCarly; True Jackson, VP; The Troop; and BrainSurge. Justice announced in 2009 that she would be working on a thriller film, set for theatrical release. Unlike initial plans of a theatrical release, the film had a limited preview release on December 12, 2009, and was returned to post-production. Ultimately the film's worldwide release was canceled.

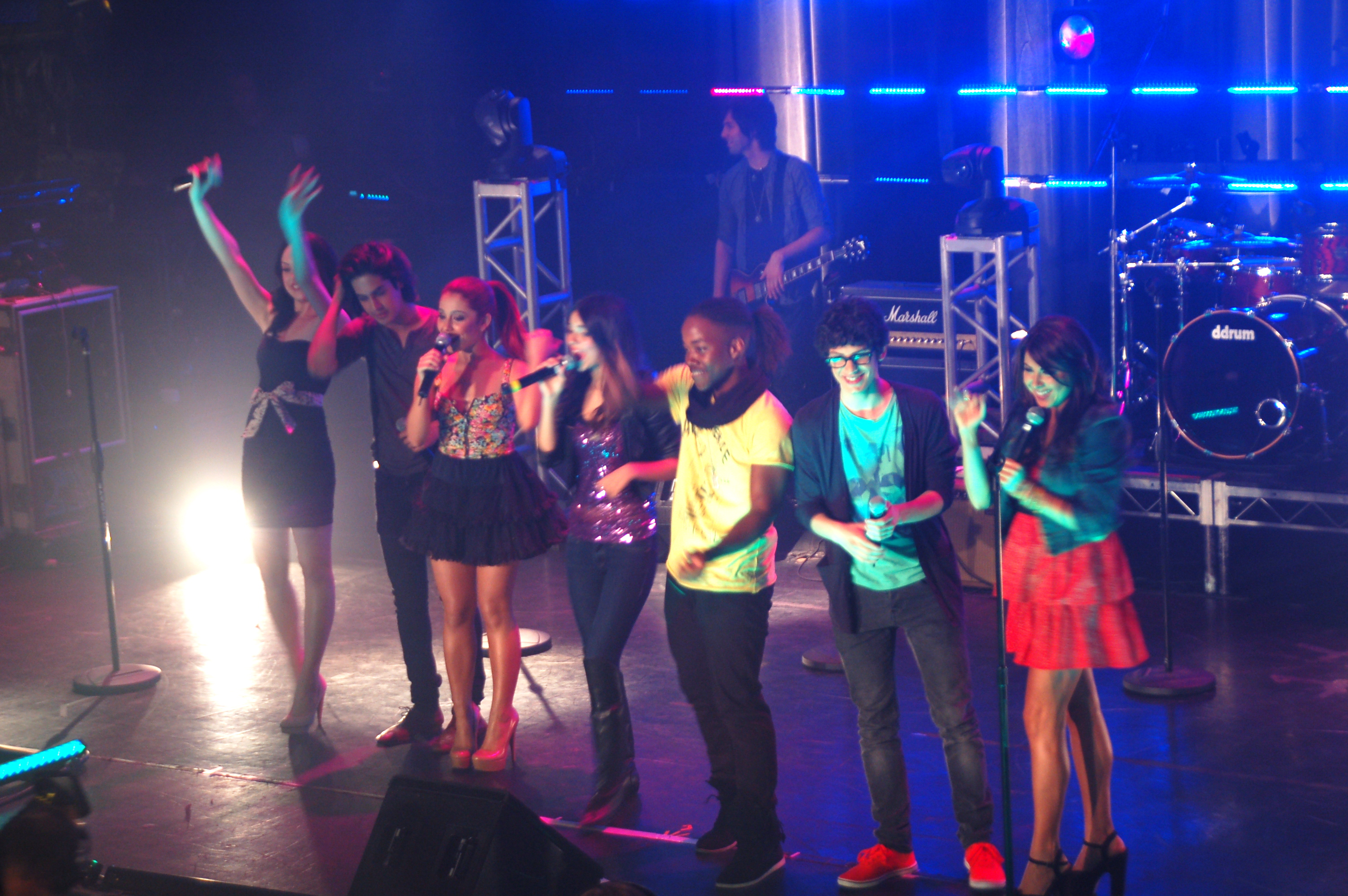
Victoria Justice and the rest of the Victorious cast performing at Avalon Hollywood

Justice confirmed that she would be starring in her own musical show on Nickelodeon called Victorious, explaining the show's genesis thus: "I was on Zoey 101. When I was 12, Dan Schneider cast me as a new character, Lola Martinez. From there, I worked with him for three years, on three seasons of Zoey 101. And, after that, Dan found out that I could also sing and dance as well as act, so he thought it would be really cool to create a show for me on Nickelodeon, called Victorious." The pilot for the show debuted on March 27, 2010, and received 5.7 million views, making it the second-highest rated premiere for a live-action Nickelodeon series. The original broadcast of this episode took place following the 2010 Kids' Choice Awards. Justice recorded several songs for the series throughout its run. Justice had the opportunity to share a recording set during the series' recordings, with different young artists who, like her, were in search of artistic possibilities.

Justice later guest-starred on the animated series The Penguins of Madagascar as Stacy in the episode "Badger Pride". Justice starred in the Nickelodeon television movie The Boy Who Cried Werewolf (2010) as Jordan Sands, a girl who transforms into a werewolf following her move to a creepy manor. The film averaged 5.8 million viewers for the premiere. Victorious ended its run on February 2, 2013. Justice played the lead role Wren in the comedy Fun Size, released on October 26, 2012. In a 2010 interview with the Associated Press, she stated that she was recording an album but planned to take her time with the process. In October 2012, she revealed she would release her debut album in 2013. For the Girl Up movement, which helps girls in developing countries, she released a promotional single, "Girl Up", co-written with Toby Gad, on February 16, 2013. Justice's debut single "Gold" was released on June 18, 2013. In August 2014, Billboard revealed that Justice had left Columbia Records but was recording new music to be released in 2015.

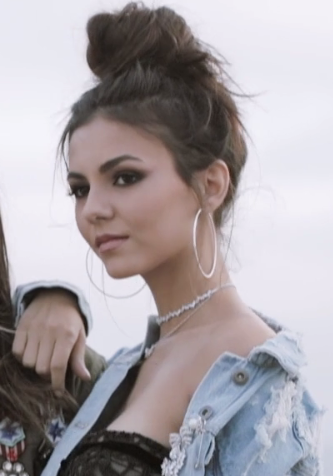
Justice in 2018

In October 2013, it was announced that Justice had been cast as Lindy Sampson in MTV's Eye Candy, a cyber thriller based on the novel by R. L. Stine. The series was canceled after one season. The same year, it was announced that Justice had been cast in Naomi and Ely's No Kiss List. The film had its world premiere at the Outfest Film Festival on July 17, 2015. It was later released on September 18, 2015, through video-on-demand services. Justice also competed against Gregg Sulkin in an episode of Lip Sync Battle that aired on July 30, 2015, performing Bonnie Tyler's "Total Eclipse of the Heart" and Nelly's "Hot in Herre".

On October 20, 2016, Justice played Janet Weiss, one of the lead roles in the Fox musical film The Rocky Horror Picture Show: Let's Do the Time Warp Again. It is a tribute to the cult classic 1975 film of the same name and was directed by Kenny Ortega, using the original script written by Richard O'Brien and Jim Sharman. Justice also starred in The Outcasts as Jodie. The film was released on April 14, 2017.

=== 2020s ===
Justice hosted the 2020 Kids' Choice Awards following Nickelodeon's decision to stage the event virtually. In July 2020, Justice announced she had become a member of the Recording Academy. That December, Justice announced that her first single in over seven years would be titled "Treat Myself". The song was released on December 11, 2020, and is the first single she released as an independent artist. This was followed by a single titled "Stay", released on February 12, 2021. The next single, "Too F*ckin' Nice", was released on May 28, 2021.

On March 12, 2021, Justice starred as Brooke Gatwick in the romantic drama film Trust. To promote the film, she released a cover of Billy Paul's "Everybody's Breaking Up". Justice starred as Cassie Garcia in the film Afterlife of the Party, which premiered on September 2, 2021, on Netflix. Along with Spencer Sutherland and Jessica Rose Weiss, she released the soundtrack EP for which she performed and co-wrote a song titled "Home". Justice portrayed Lola Alvarez in the Netflix romantic comedy film A Perfect Pairing, released on May 19, 2022. Justice portrayed Annie, a pregnant woman, in the thriller The Tutor, which premiered on March 24, 2023. She also joined the cast of the comedy California King, in which she plays a character named Lynette. In 2024, she starred in the thriller Depravity.

On February 19, 2023, coinciding with her 30th birthday, Justice released the single "Last Man Standing" and confirmed that she was working on her debut studio album.

On October 3, 2025, Justice released the single "Love Zombie". Her Christmas single "Santa Darlin'" released on November 21, 2025.

== Philanthropy ==
Justice has taken part in several charity events, supporting charities such as the United Nations Foundation, which benefits numerous causes such as AIDS, Children, Environment, Health, Human Rights, and Peace.

On September 30, 2010, Justice announced she would be joining the charity campaign Girl Up. When asked about joining, she stated "I'm so excited to become a champion for Girl Up and to help make a difference for girls who aren't given the same opportunities that most of us take for granted. I know that there are plenty of girls throughout the country who are just like me—ready and motivated to stand up for the rights and well-being of girls in the developing world. I am confident that, together, we will rise to the challenge."

Justice joined Girl Up on September 30, 2010, for the campaign's official launch in New York City and went on to support the "Unite for Girls" tour, which traveled to cities across the United States. She visited Girl Up–supported programs in developing countries to observe first-hand the impact the programs can have on girls and communities. In an interview with Seventeen, Justice stated, "I was looking into different charities and hearing these girls in Guatemala and Africa talk about having to walk miles for water and crying because they don't have any money to go to school. It just really broke my heart, so I want to spread the word as much as I can and get other people working together. Before you know it we can actually make a difference."

== Artistry ==
Justice's musical influences include Madonna, Britney Spears, Pink, Sara Bareilles, Coldplay, No Doubt, the Jackson 5, the Beatles, Amy Winehouse, Lily Allen, Hall & Oates, Billy Joel, Carly Simon, Karen Carpenter, Elton John, Alanis Morissette, Carole King, and Diana Ross.

== Personal life ==
In 2013, Justice lived with her parents in an Encino Hills home she purchased. In 2015, Justice revealed that she had been diagnosed with Hashimoto's thyroiditis, an autoimmune disorder. On June 30, 2019, she participated in the New York City Pride Parade during WorldPride, where she celebrated Pride Month and showed support for the LGBTQ community.

== Filmography ==
Key
†	Denotes films that have not yet been released

=== Film ===
Year	Title	Role	Notes
2005	When Do We Eat?	Young Nikky	
2006	The Garden	Holly	
2006	Unknown	Daughter	
2008	Adventures in Appletown	Betsy	
2012	The First Time	Jane Harmon	
2012	Fun Size	Wren DeSantis	
2013	Jungle Master	Rainie	Voice role (English dub)
2015	Get Squirrely	Lola	Voice role
2015	Naomi and Ely's No Kiss List	Naomi Mills	
2017	The Outcasts	Jodi Schellenberger	Originally titled The Outskirts
2018	Bigger	Kathy Weider	
2019	Summer Night	Harmony	
2021	Trust	Brooke Gatwick	
2021	Afterlife of the Party	Cassie Garcia	
2022	A Perfect Pairing	Lola Alvarez	
2023	The Tutor	Annie	
2024	Depravity	Grave Shaw	
2025	California King	Lynette Jean	
TBA	Send a Scare †	TBA	To be released

=== Television ===
Year	Title	Role	Notes
2003	Gilmore Girls	Jill #2	Episode: "The Hobbit, the Sofa, and Digger Stiles"
2005	The Suite Life of Zack & Cody	Rebecca	Episode: "The Fairest of Them All"
2005–2008	Zoey 101	Lola Martinez	Main role (seasons 2–4)
2005	Silver Bells	Rose	Television film
2006	Everwood	Thalia Thompson	Episode: "Enjoy the Ride"
2009	The Naked Brothers Band	Herself	2 episodes
2009	Spectacular!	Tammi Dyson	Television film
2009	iCarly	Shelby Marx	Episode: "iFight Shelby Marx"
2011	iCarly	Tori Vega	Episode: "iParty with Victorious"
2009	True Jackson, VP	Vivian	Episode: "True Crush"
2010	The Troop	Eris Fairy	Episode: "Speed"
2010–2013	Victorious	Tori Vega	Main role
2010, 2015	The Penguins of Madagascar	Stacy	Voice role; 2 episodes
2010	The Boy Who Cried Werewolf	Jordan Sands	Television film
2013	Big Time Rush	Herself	Episode: "Big Time Tour Bus"
2015	Eye Candy	Lindy Sampson	Main role
2015	Undateable	Amanda	2 episodes
2016	Cooper Barrett's Guide to Surviving Life	Ramona Miller	2 episodes
2016	The Rocky Horror Picture Show: Let's Do the Time Warp Again	Janet Weiss	Television film
2017	Impractical Jokers	Herself	Special guest
2017	Man with a Plan	Sophia	Episode: "The Silver Fox"
2018	Robot Chicken	Student	Voice role; episode: "Factory Where Nuts Are Handled"
2018	Queen America	Hayley Wilson	2 episodes
2018	American Housewife	Harper	Episode: "Trophy Wife"
2020	The Real Bros of Simi Valley	Courtney Ingles	4 episodes
2020	50 States of Fright	Logan	3 episodes
2025	Suits LA	Dylan Pryor	Recurring role

== Tours ==
- Make It in America Tour (2012)
- Summer Break Tour (with Big Time Rush) (2013)

== Awards and nominations ==
Award	Year	Category	Nominated work	Result	Ref.
ALMA Awards	2011	Favorite TV Actress – Comedy	Victorious	Nominated	
ALMA Awards	2012	Favorite TV Actress – Comedy	Victorious	Nominated	
Bravo Otto	2011	Super Female TV Star	—	Bronze	
BreakTudo Awards	2018	International Instagrammer	—	Won	
BreakTudo Awards	2023	Anthem of the Year	"Only a Stranger"	Nominated	
Do Something Awards	2012	TV Star: Female	—	Nominated	
Imagen Awards	2011	Best Young Actress/Television	Victorious	Nominated	
Imagen Awards	2012	Best Young Actress/Television	Victorious	Nominated	
Imagen Awards	2013	Best Young Actress/Television	Victorious	Nominated	
NAACP Image Awards	2011	Outstanding Performance in a Youth/Children's Program (Series or Special)	Victorious	Nominated	
Nickelodeon Australian Kids' Choice Awards	2011	Hottest Hottie	—	Won	
Nickelodeon Australian Kids' Choice Awards	2011	Super Fresh Award	—	Nominated	
Nickelodeon Australian Kids' Choice Awards	2011	Fave TV Star	Victorious	Nominated	
Nickelodeon Kids' Choice Awards	2011	Favorite TV Actress	Victorious	Nominated	
Nickelodeon Kids' Choice Awards	2012	Favorite TV Actress	Victorious	Nominated	
Nickelodeon Kids' Choice Awards	2013	Favorite TV Actress	Victorious	Nominated	
Nickelodeon SlimeFest	2012	Aussie's Fave Hottie	—	Won	
Nickelodeon SlimeFest	2012	Aussie's Fave Nick Star	Victorious	Won	
Teen Choice Awards	2010	Choice Smile	—	Nominated	
Young Artist Awards	2006	Best Young Ensemble Performance in a TV Series (Comedy or Drama)	Zoey 101 (shared with cast)	Won	
Young Artist Awards	2007	Best Performance in a TV Series – Supporting Young Actress	Zoey 101	Nominated	
Young Artist Awards	2007	Best Young Ensemble Performance in a TV Series (Comedy or Drama)	Zoey 101 (shared with cast)	Won	
Young Artist Awards	2008	Best Young Ensemble Performance in a TV Series	Zoey 101	Nominated	
Young Artist Awards	2011	Best Performance in a TV Movie, Miniseries or Special – Leading Young Actress	The Boy Who Cried Werewolf	Nominated	
Young Artist Awards	2012	Best Performance in a TV Series – Recurring Young Actress 17–21	iCarly	Nominated	

== See also ==
- List of Puerto Ricans
- List of American former child actors
