= Victorious =

2010 American teen sitcom

- Genre: Teen sitcom
- Created by: Dan Schneider
- Showrunner: Dan Schneider
- Starring: Victoria Justice; Leon Thomas III; Matt Bennett; Elizabeth Gillies; Ariana Grande; Avan Jogia; Daniella Monet
- Theme music composer: Łukasz Gottwald; Michael Corcoran; Dan Schneider
- Opening theme: "Make It Shine"
- Country of origin: United States
- Original language: English
- No. of seasons: 4
- No. of episodes: 57 (list of episodes)

Production
- Executive producers: Dan Schneider; Warren Bell; Robin Weiner
- Producers: Bruce Rand Berman; Joe Catania; Jake Farrow; Matt Fleckenstein; Tom Keniston; Christopher J. Nowak
- Production locations: Nickelodeon on Sunset; Hollywood, California
- Camera setup: Videotape (filmized); Multi-camera
- Running time: 24 minutes 46 minutes (specials)
- Production companies: Schneider's Bakery; Sony Music Entertainment; Nickelodeon Productions

Original release
- Network: Nickelodeon
- Release: March 27, 2010 – February 2, 2013

Related
- Sam & Cat (2013–2014); Hollywood Arts (2026)

Victorious is an American teen sitcom created by Dan Schneider that aired on Nickelodeon from March 27, 2010, to February 2, 2013. The series ran for four seasons and produced 57 episodes.

The show follows aspiring singer Tori Vega, a teenager who enrolls at the performing-arts high school Hollywood Arts after unexpectedly taking her older sister Trina's place in a school showcase. As she adjusts to her new environment, Tori navigates a series of comedic situations with fellow students Andre Harris, Robbie Shapiro, Jade West, Cat Valentine, and Beck Oliver.

Nickelodeon broadcast the series premiere immediately following the 2010 Kids' Choice Awards. Although the series received mixed reviews from critics, it was popular with viewers; it won the Favorite TV Show category at the Kids' Choice Awards in 2012 and 2013 and received four nominations for the Primetime Emmy Awards.

== Plot ==
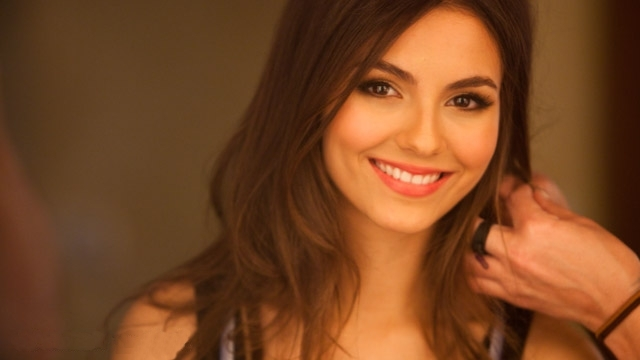
Victoria Justice, pictured in 2011, portrays series protagonist Tori Vega.

The series follows Tori Vega, a teenage girl who is offered admission to Hollywood Arts, a fictional elite performing arts high school, after unexpectedly filling in for her older sister during a school showcase. As she adapts to her new environment, Tori forms a close group of friends among her fellow students.

They include Andre Harris, a musically gifted student who becomes her closest friend and creative partner; Robbie Shapiro, a socially awkward ventriloquist who frequently communicates through his wisecracking puppet, Rex Powers; Cat Valentine, a kind but naïve and childish redhead; Jade West, a sarcastic and anti heroine classmate who serves as Tori's frenemy and antagonist of the series; and Beck Oliver, Jade's laid-back and charismatic boyfriend. Trina Vega, Tori's older sister, also attends Hollywood Arts and is characterized by her vanity and self-confidence despite her limited talent.

Other characters include Erwin Sikowitz, the school's eccentric acting teacher; Lane Alexander, the guidance counselor; and Sinjin Van Cleef, an unusual and often unsettling classmate who manages the school's audiovisual equipment.

== Cast ==
=== Main ===
- Victoria Justice as Tori Vega
- Leon Thomas III as Andre Harris
- Matt Bennett as Robbie Shapiro
- Elizabeth Gillies as Jade West
- Ariana Grande as Cat Valentine
- Avan Jogia as Beck Oliver
- Daniella Monet as Trina Vega

=== Recurring ===
- Eric Lange as Erwin Sikowitz
- Lane Napper as Lane Alexander
- Michael Eric Reid as Sinjin Van Cleef
- Jim Pirri as David Vega
- Jennifer Carta as Holly Vega
- Marilyn Harris as Andre's grandmother
- Susan Chuang as Mrs. Lee
- Darsan Solomon as Burf
- Jake Farrow as Rex Powers (voice, uncredited)

== Episodes ==
Season	Episodes	Originally released	
Season	Episodes	First released	Last released
1	19	March 27, 2010	March 26, 2011
2	13	April 2, 2011	December 26, 2011
3	12	January 28, 2012	June 30, 2012
4	13	September 22, 2012	February 2, 2013

== Production ==
Victorious is the fifth series created by Dan Schneider for Nickelodeon, after The Amanda Show, Drake & Josh, Zoey 101, and iCarly. Schneider first met Victoria Justice in 2005, when she was twelve and arrived to audition for the part of Lola Martinez on Zoey 101. Impressed by her energy and look, Schneider hired her and, after working with her on three episodes, called Nickelodeon to say, "I've got your next star." Justice continued her role on Zoey 101 until the series ended in 2008. In the meantime, Disney Channel, Nickelodeon's main competitor, had experienced immense success with franchises like Hannah Montana and High School Musical, which featured original songs and generated revenue through music as well as television. Seeking to "follow where the kids are", Nickelodeon executives asked Schneider to create a music-based show for the channel. Near the end of Zoey 101's run, Justice was summoned to meet with Schneider about a potential series starring her. Victorious is the first series on Nickelodeon to premiere in the 2010s decade. Big Time Rush's first episode premiered two months earlier, but its original pilot premiered in 2009.

While discussing possible concepts for the series during the meeting, Justice mentioned that she had attended a performing arts middle school. The idea intrigued Schneider, who recognized the appeal of a series concerning fame. "If there is anything I've learned about kids today—and I'm not saying this is good or bad—it's that they all want to be stars," said Schneider. Marjorie Cohn, who was then Nickelodeon's executive vice president of original programming and development, agreed. "Every kid thinks they're five minutes away and one lucky circumstance from being famous", Cohn stated. She noted that Schneider's iCarly, a sitcom about a girl who hosts a popular web show, was spurred by the rise of YouTube celebrities and has become a successful series for Nickelodeon.

On August 13, 2008, Nickelodeon announced that Justice had signed "an overall talent and music deal" with the company, agreeing to star in a then-untitled musical-comedy series about a girl who attends a performing arts high school. While discussing the show's premise, Schneider stated that while it would be nice if more children "wanted to be teachers and social workers" instead of celebrities, "At least in Victorious, you see a world where they're all working on the talent part." Nickelodeon Productions and the Columbia/Epic Label Group of Sony Music Entertainment agreed to co-produce the series as part of a partnership to develop talent and release their music.

Jerry Trainor, Perez Hilton, Josh Peck, Kesha, Nathan Kress, Drake Bell, Miranda Sings, and Jennette McCurdy have appeared on the series in cameos or as guest stars.

Season 1 of Victorious began filming on October 5, 2009, and ended on April 14, 2010, with 20 episodes produced. Season 2 began filming October 4, 2010, and finished filming on February 23, 2011. In August 2011, Victoria Justice confirmed that she was returning to the Victorious set, as Season 3 began filming on October 3, 2011. During the TV special 7 Secrets with Victoria Justice, Justice explained the weekly schedule the cast and crew operate on: scripts are issued to them on Sunday nights, the cast has table reads on Mondays and Tuesdays, then the episode is shot on Wednesday, Thursday and Friday and on Saturday, they watch a premiering of their show that is newly released to the public then.

Victoria Justice told M Magazine in August 2012 that "We will not be expecting a fourth season, this is the first time I've talked about it. I just found out a couple of days ago that we're not coming back. It's sad because I've been with Nickelodeon since I was 12 years old and I became a family with my Victorious cast. We spent a lot of time together and bonded for sure – I'll look back on the experience very fondly. It's a little shocking and a little bittersweet, but at the end of the day it might not be such a bad thing – we all want to do our own thing and continue to grow." The third season was split into two, thus making four seasons in total.

The series ended without a proper finale, a fact referenced in an episode of the series' spin-off, Sam & Cat, when the title characters' favorite show is cancelled and Cat asks, "What kind of network cancels a show without giving it a proper finale?"

=== Casting ===
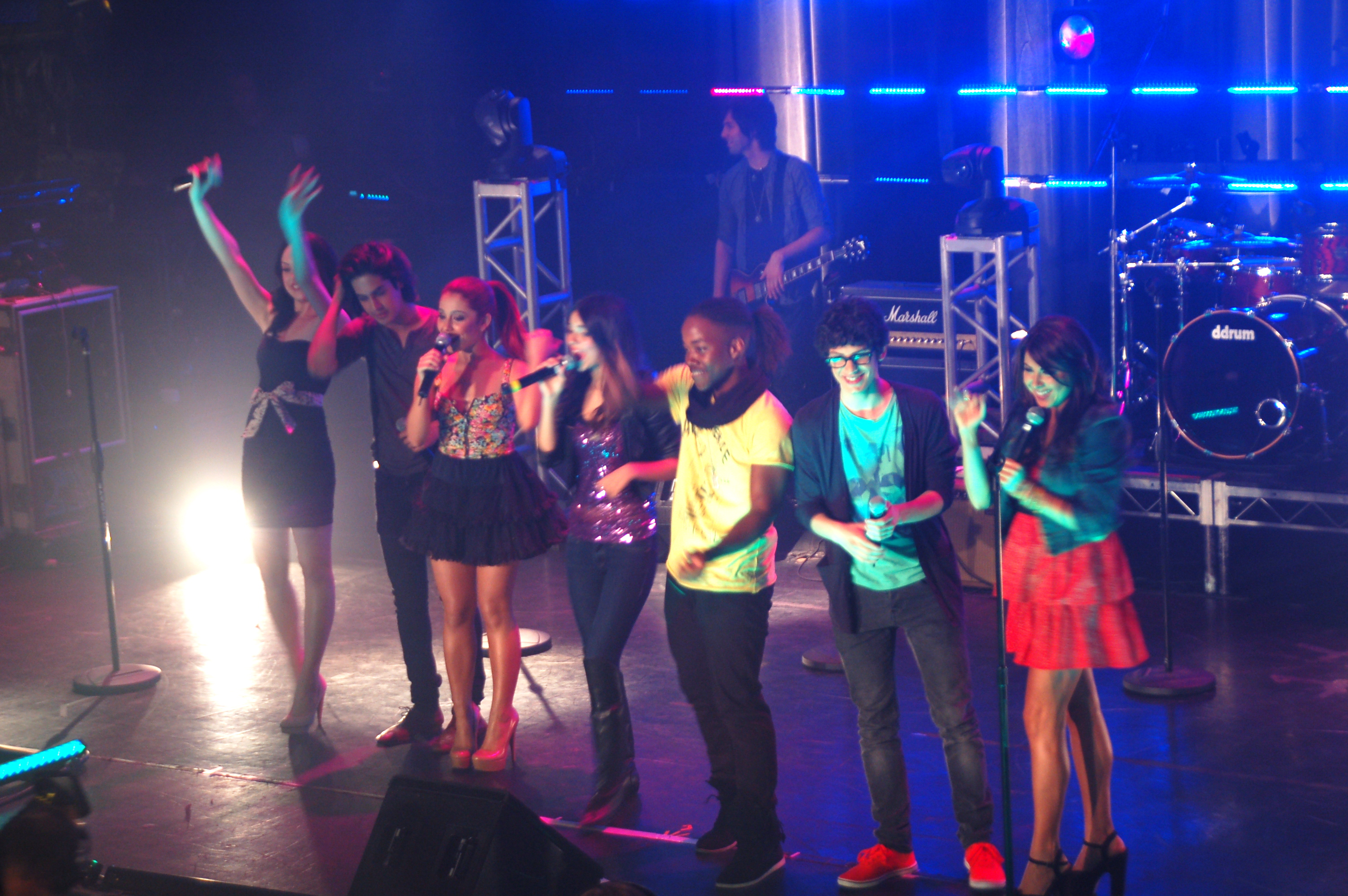
Cast concert, 2011, from left to right: Elizabeth Gillies, Avan Jogia, Ariana Grande, Victoria Justice, Leon Thomas III, Matt Bennett, and Daniella Monet

Several of the actors on Victorious had either appeared in other Nickelodeon programs or Broadway musicals prior to Victorious' premiere. In addition to Zoey 101, Victoria Justice appeared on iCarly in "iFight Shelby Marx" as Shelby Marx, as well as True Jackson, VP, The Naked Brothers Band, and The Troop. She also co-starred with Avan Jogia, who portrays Beck, in the Nickelodeon television musical film Spectacular! Daniella Monet has guest starred as Rebecca Martin in three episodes of Zoey 101, Tootie in the Nickelodeon television film A Fairly Odd Movie: Grow Up, Timmy Turner!, the Supah Ninjas Season 1 episode "Morningstar Academy" as one of the main antagonists named Clarissa, and in Fred 2: Night of the Living Fred (in lieu of Jennette McCurdy) as Bertha. Leon Thomas III had not only guest starred in an episode of iCarly as Harper and also in The Naked Brothers Band but he had also previously appeared in musicals such as The Lion King, The Color Purple, and Caroline, or Change, and in the film August Rush. Elizabeth Gillies and Ariana Grande had co-starred in the musical 13.

=== Sets ===
Victorious was filmed at Nickelodeon on Sunset on Sunset Boulevard in Hollywood. According to Paula Kaplan, Nickelodeon's executive Vice President for talent, "In our adult world, nobody accommodates us for down time. But in a child's life on a set, we do take that seriously. At our studios on Sunset Boulevard, where we shoot iCarly and Victorious, the greenrooms are filled with games and Rock Band. We create an environment where they can have fun with their colleagues and take it easy."

Victorious is set primarily at Hollywood Arts, however the front of Hollywood Arts High School are digitally altered photos of Burbank High School. The lunch area of Hollywood Arts depicts the back area of Nickelodeon on Sunset, with a parking lot next to the back area. According to David Hinkley of the New York Daily News, "Outside of school, Victorious has the same look as iCarly, with most of the action taking place on one main set with a few basic home/crib-furniture items." The series also has a BLIX machine from Zoey 101.

== Reception ==
=== Critical reception ===
Variety magazine reviewer Brian Lowry wrote, "Victorious has been cobbled together with the wooden-headed market in mind." David Hinkley of the New York Daily News says the series' format is nearly identical to iCarly's and hopes that the series will develop a "more distinctive personality" over the course of the season. Roger Catlin of the Hartford Courant describes Victorious as "harmless but hardly entertaining". Mark A. Perigard of the Boston Herald titled his review "Victorious is a big loser" and writes, "The bulk of the cast mugs for the cameras, probably to compensate for a script that could have been commissioned from fifth-graders." Linda Stasi of the New York Post was mixed; she agreed that the series contained over-acting performers, "corny" dialogue and a "terribly, terribly loud laugh track", but believed it was "a surefire tween hit".

However, reviewers were positive about Justice's performance and suggested that the show's potential hinged on her. Hinkley comments, "At this point, Justice is better at singing than acting, and the show doesn't flow as smoothly as iCarly, but Justice has the personality and talent needed for a shot at being 'the Next Big Teen Thing'". Perigard describes her as "undeniably appealing" and Lowry states, "Justice is winsome and talented enough to provide the latest show a leg up in connecting with tween girls." Emily Ashby of Common Sense Media gave the series four out of five stars, writing, "Upbeat iCarly-like tween comedy promotes confidence".

=== Viewership ===
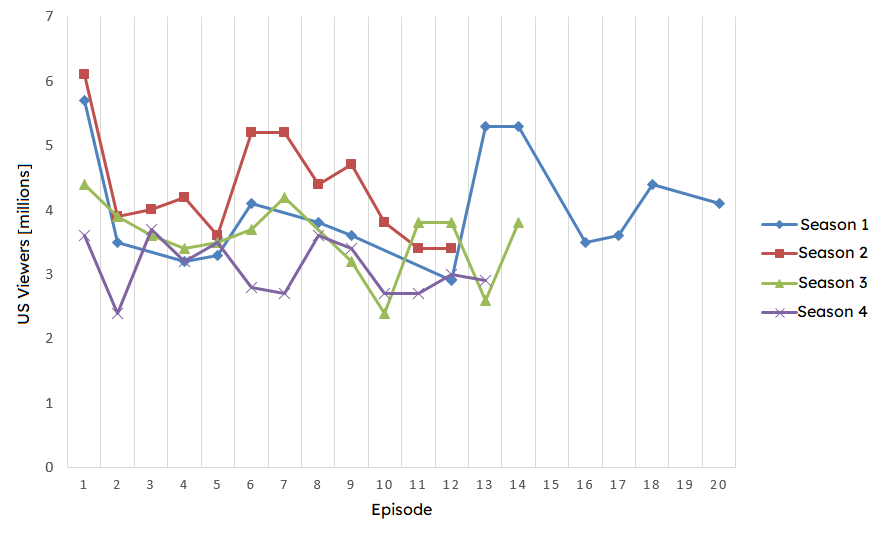
Graph of Victorious US Viewership

The first episode, advertised as a "sneak preview" of the series, aired after the 2010 Kids' Choice Awards on March 27, 2010, to 5.7 million viewers, the second-highest premiering live-action Nickelodeon series to date. Its second episode was advertised as the series' official premiere and drew 3.48 million viewers. By comparison, Nickelodeon's Big Time Rush received 3.5 million viewers for its "sneak preview" debut in November 2009, and 7.1 million total viewers for its "premiere" in January 2010.

On April 2, 2011, the Season 2 premiere episode "Beggin' on Your Knees" became the most-watched episode of the series, with 6.1 million total viewers.

Season	List of episodes	First Aired	U.S. Viewers (in millions)	Last Aired	U.S. Viewers (in millions)	Average U.S. ratings (viewers in millions)
1	19	March 27, 2010	5.7	March 26, 2011	4.1	4.00 (for 17 of 19 episodes)
2	13	April 2, 2011	6.2	December 26, 2011	N/A	4.27 (for 12 of 13 episodes)
3	12	January 28, 2012	3.9	June 30, 2012	3.8	3.46
4	13	September 22, 2012	3.6	February 2, 2013	2.89	3.09

=== Merchandise ===
In fall 2011, Spin Master released dolls and toys based on the show. In June 2011, Walmart announced an exclusive-to-Walmart product line for the show; including over 250 products, such as apparel, accessories, lunch boxes, T-shirts, soundtrack CDs, DVDs, etc. It has sold its newest toy, Singing Tori, a doll of Tori singing. In 2012 dolls of Cat, Trina, and Jade were released. In late April 2012, McDonald's released Victorious toys, included in their Happy Meals. They relaunched in Australia in January/February 2013.

=== Video games ===
On November 15, 2011, Victorious: Time to Shine for Xbox 360 Kinect and Hollywood Arts Debut for Nintendo DS were released. On November 13, 2012, Victorious: Taking the Lead for Wii and Nintendo DS was released.

== Awards and nominations ==
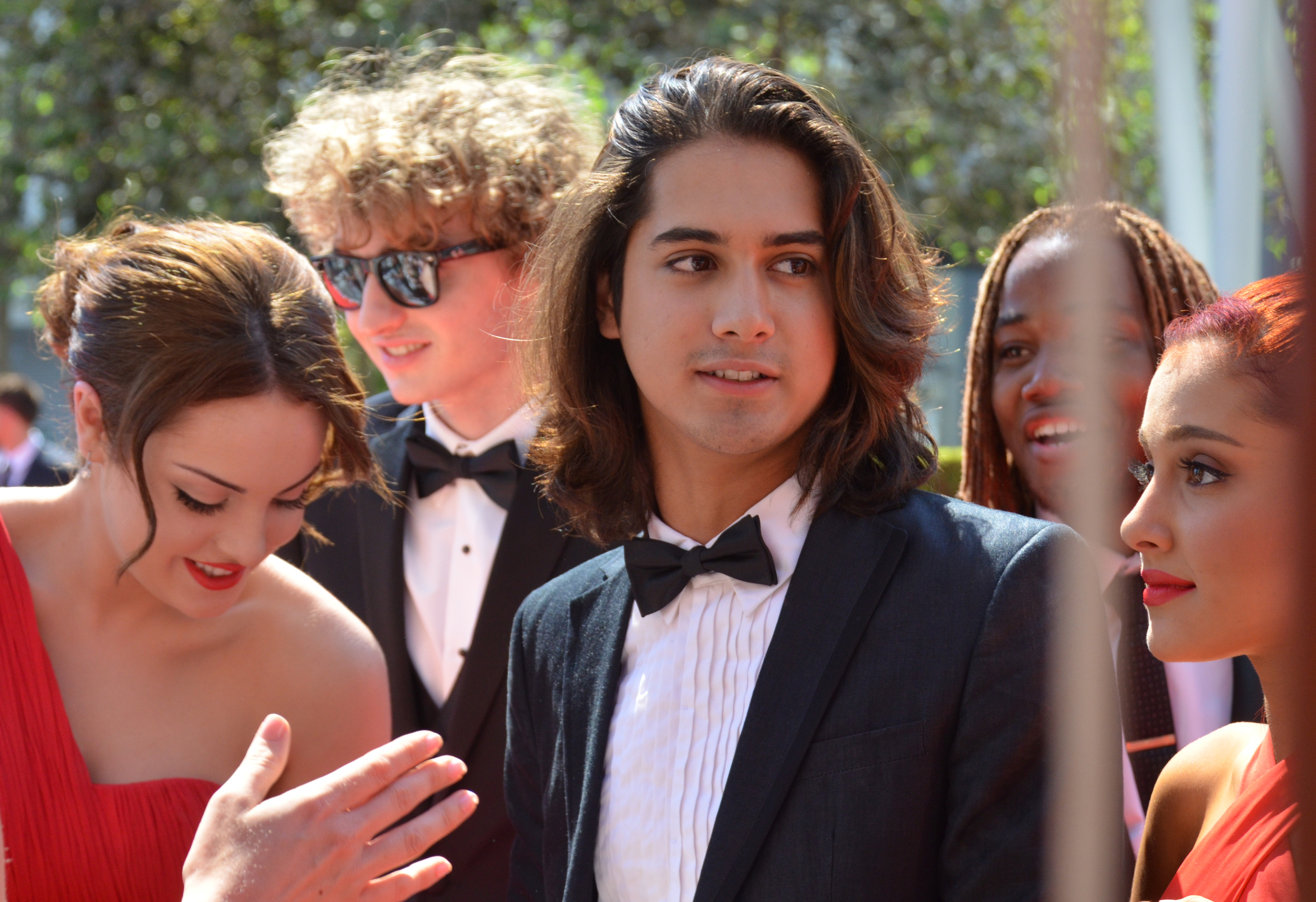
Victorious cast at the 64th Primetime Emmy Awards in September 2012

Year	Award	Category	Recipient	Result	Ref.
2010	Teen Choice Awards	Choice TV Breakout Show	Victorious	Nominated	
2010	Hollywood Teen TV Awards	Teen Pick Show: Comedy	Victorious	Nominated	
2011	UK Kids' Choice Awards 2011	Nick UK's Favourite TV Show	Victorious	Nominated	
2011	Australian Kids' Choice Awards 2011	Fave TV Show	Victorious	Nominated	
2011	Primetime Emmy Awards	Outstanding Children's Program	Victorious	Nominated	
2011	British Academy Children's Awards	BAFTA Kid's Vote: Television	Victorious	Nominated	
2011	Youth Rocks Awards	Rockin' Ensemble Cast (TV/ Comedy)	Victorious	Nominated	
2012	2012 Kids' Choice Awards	Favorite TV Show	Victorious	Won	
2012	Hollywood Teen TV Awards	Favorite Television Show	Victorious	Nominated	
2012	Primetime Emmy Awards	Outstanding Children's Program	Victorious	Nominated	
2012	Primetime Emmy Awards	Outstanding Hairstyling for a Multi-Camera Series or Special	Episode: April Fools Blank	Nominated	
2012	Primetime Emmy Awards	Outstanding Makeup for a Multi-Camera Series or Special (Non-Prosthetic)	Episode: April Fools Blank	Nominated	
2012	Casting Society of America	Outstanding Achievement in Casting - Children's Series Programming	Krisha Bullock; Jennifer Treadwell	Nominated	
2012	Kids' Choice Awards Mexico	Favorite International Show	Victorious	Nominated	
2012	Kids' Choice Awards Argentina	International TV Show	Victorious	Won	
2013	2013 Kids' Choice Awards	Favorite TV Show	Victorious	Won	
2013	2013 Kids' Choice Awards	Favorite TV Actress	Victorious	Nominated	
2013	Kids Choice Awards México 2013	Favorite international TV Show	Victorious	Won	
2014	British Academy Children's Awards	BAFTA Kid's Vote - Television	Victorious	Nominated	

== Music ==
=== Soundtracks ===
- Victorious: Music from the Hit TV Show (2011)
- Victorious 2.0: More Music from the Hit TV Show (2012)
- Victorious 3.0: Even More Music from the Hit TV Show (2012)

"Make It Shine" is the theme song of the series. The song also serves as the lead single from the soundtrack to the series. Victorious features approximately one song every three episodes. The Victorious soundtrack, featuring 12 songs from the show (including "Leave It All to Shine") was released on August 2, 2011. The first 1,000 pre-orders received a CD booklet autographed by Justice, the special pre-order package (ordered before July 19, 2011) also included an exclusive customized Victorious poster.

On June 5, 2012, Columbia Records and Nickelodeon released Victorious 2.0: More Music from the Hit TV Show. The third soundtrack from the series, entitled Victorious 3.0: Even More Music from the Hit TV Show, was released on November 6, 2012.

== Home media ==
In addition to home releases throughout the early 2010s, Victorious was added to Netflix in November 2019, followed by Paramount+ at its inception in March 2021. On Netflix, episodes from seasons one and two are listed in airing order, with the exception of "A Christmas Tori", while season three is listed in production order; on Paramount+, all episodes across seasons one to three are listed in production order, with neither streaming service offering the fourth season Nickelodeon split episodes into for airing. In 2024 alone, Netflix reported the series has amassed over 45 million views.

DVD release dates for Victorious
Name	Release dates			Ep #	Bonus features	Additional information
Name	Region 1	Region 2	Region 4	Ep #		Additional information
Season One, Volume One	July 5, 2011	February 13, 2012	March 16, 2012	10	Meet the characters; Music Videos: "Freak the Freak Out" and "Beggin' on Your Knees"; Bonus iCarly episode: "I Am Your Biggest Fan" (Regions 2 & 4 only)	Audio: English Dolby Digital Stereo.; Spanish & Portuguese Stereo (Region 4); French, German & Castilian Spanish stereo (Region 2)
Season One, Volume Two	November 1, 2011	September 17, 2012	January 11, 2013	9	iCarly crossover episode "iParty With Victorious" (Region 1 only); "Behind-the-Scenes: "iParty With Victorious" Mash-Up performance"; Music Video: "Best Friend's Brother"; Bonus Big Time Rush episode: "Welcome Back Big Time" (Regions 2 & 4)	Audio: English Dolby Digital Stereo.; Spanish & Portuguese Stereo (Region 4); French, German & Castilian Spanish stereo (Region 2)
The Complete First Season	TBA	October 15, 2012	TBA	19	All of the bonus features included in Vol. 1 & 2 in Season 1, excluding the iCarly crossover episode.	Region 2 only release
The Complete Second Season	May 15, 2012	February 18, 2013	April 12, 2013	13	The Seven Secrets of Victoria Justice special; Behind the scenes of "Locked Up"	Audio: English Dolby Digital Stereo.; Spanish & Portuguese Stereo (Region 4); French, German & Castilian Spanish stereo (Region 2)
Season Three, Volume One	TBA	2013	September 13, 2013	14	No bonus features included	Audio: English Dolby Digital Stereo.; Spanish & Portuguese Stereo (Region 4); French, German & Castilian Spanish stereo (Region 2)
Season Three, Volume Two	TBA	2014	March 14, 2014	13	No bonus features included	Audio: English Dolby Digital Stereo.; Spanish & Portuguese Stereo (Region 4); French, German & Castilian Spanish stereo (Region 2)

== Broadcast ==
Victorious has aired worldwide on Nickelodeon.

=== Season 1 ===
Season 1 premiered on April 5, 2010, in Canada, on September 3, 2010, in the United Kingdom and Ireland, on September 14, 2010, in Australia and New Zealand, on October 1, 2010, in Southeast Asia, on March 27, 2011, in Pakistan and on January 23, 2013, in India.

=== Season 2 ===
Season 2 premiered on October 7, 2011, in Canada, on October 17, 2011, in the UK and Ireland, on October 31, 2011, in Southeast Asia, in December 2011 in Australia and New Zealand, and on March 25, 2013, in India.

=== Season 3 ===
Season 3 premiered in February 2012 in Canada, on September 7, 2012, in Southeast Asia, on September 15, 2012, in Australia and New Zealand, and on September 22, 2012, in the UK and Ireland.

=== Season 4 ===
Season 4 premiered on February 8, 2013, in Southeast Asia, on February 11, 2013, in the UK and Ireland, and on March 8, 2013, in Australia and New Zealand.

== Spin-offs ==
=== Sam & Cat ===
A pilot was ordered for a series titled Sam & Cat. This series is a spin-off of both iCarly and Victorious, starring Ariana Grande as her character Cat Valentine from Victorious and Jennette McCurdy as Sam Puckett from iCarly. The series is about these two girls as they buddy up as roommates and start a babysitting business to fund their adventures. The 20-episode order was doubled to 40 episodes on July 11, 2013. However, by April 2014, the series was on hiatus due to behind-the-scenes issues with the cast and network. After months of speculation, Sam & Cat was officially canceled on July 13, 2014.

=== Hollywood Arts ===
On February 6, 2025, it was announced that Nickelodeon was developing a Victorious spin-off titled Hollywood Arts. Daniella Monet is set to reprise her role as Trina Vega, as well as executive producing the show. Dan Schneider, the creator of the original series, has no involvement with this project. Jake Farrow, who performed the voice of Rex Powers on Victorious, and Samantha Martin are the showrunners. The show will debut on Netflix in 2026, with subsequent distribution on Nickelodeon and Paramount+.
