= Mark Ruffin =

American broadcaster, producer, and writer (born 1956)

- Born: Mark Anthony Ruffin; September 24, 1956; Chicago, Illinois, U.S.
- Genres: Jazz
- Occupations: Broadcaster, producer, writer
- Years active: 1980–present

Mark Anthony Ruffin (born September 24, 1956) is an American broadcaster, producer, and writer. He has won the regional Chicago / Midwest Emmy Awards two times, and has been nominated for a Grammy Award. Ruffin has been the Program Director/On-Air host for Sirius XM's Real Jazz channel since 2007.

Ruffin received both the Jazz Journalists Association's Career Excellence Award in Broadcasting and the Duke Dubois Humanitarian Award from Jazz Week in 2017.

Ruffin is on the board of jurors for the Peabody Awards.

== Biography ==
Mark Anthony Ruffin, was born in Chicago, IL on September 24, 1956. Ruffin's parents had a record store on the west side of the city for the first eight years of his life. He grew up in the suburb town of Maywood, Illinois where he graduated from Proviso East High School and studied Radio/TV and music at Southern Illinois University/Carbondale. Mark is the father to three sons: Melcolm Xavier Ruffin, Sidney-Bechet Mandela Ruffin, and Kenyatta Hents Philips-Ruffin.

== Career ==
Before rising to prominence in North America, Ruffin was a presence in Chicago jazz radio for over 25 years, where he was also Jazz Editor at Chicago Magazine from 1982 to 2007. He has had a varied multi-tasked career in radio, television, journalism, recorded music, and film – with a focus on Jazz and American culture in all the mediums.

=== Radio ===
Since 2007, Ruffin has been the Program Director and On-Air host for Sirius XM's Real Jazz channel. 1980–2000, he started as an operations engineer at WBEZ-FM/Chicago. In 1980, he got his first on-air opportunity through the Jazz Institute of Chicago. From there: 1981–1985, Jazz Music Director WDCB/Glen Ellyn, 1985–1988, Music Director-WBEE-AM/Chicago, 1988–1996, Producer/Announcer WNUA/Chicago. 1996–2000, Announcer/Producer WBEZ/Chicago. 2002–2007, Ruffin joined Miles Ahead Incorporated which produced, Miles Ahead and Listen Here, two syndicated shows featuring him and Grammy Award-winning annotator and broadcaster Neil Tesser. The latter show was distributed by WFMT Satellite Network and was heard on up to 120 stations in the U.S. and Canada.

Ruffin was the original producer of the nationally syndicated Ramsey Lewis Show which was distributed by Westwood One in the 1990s. Since that time he has produced nationally syndicated programs for Oprah Winfrey, Gayle King, Steppenwolf Theatre Company, Dr. Robin Smith, Bruce Lundvall, Marcus Miller, Christian McBride, Don Was, Joey DeFrancesco and others.

=== Television ===
2000–2007 Ruffin was a cultural correspondent for the Chicago PBS television station WTTW-TV. His pieces on Jazz and American culture were presented on the televisions shows Artbeat Chicago and Chicago Tonight. He won two Emmy Awards while at WTTW. 2014–2017 Ruffin was a recurrent moderator and host of the AOL Build Speaker Series where he was featured interviewing a number of personalities including Don Cheadle, Jon Batiste, Harry Connick Jr., Herb Alpert and many others.

=== Journalism ===
Ruffin was the Jazz Editor of Chicago Magazine from 1982 to 2007, Contributor at Down Beat Magazine 1985–2005, Jazz Stringer at Chicago Sun-Times 1989–1997, Music Editor at N'Digo Magazine 1995–2005 and contributed to Jazziz, JazzUSA.com, Playboy, Ebony, Illinois Entertainer and many other publications.

== Records ==
=== Annotator ===
Ruffin has numerous annotation credits.

=== Associate producer ===
- 1987 Frank Mantooth – Per-Se-Vere
- 1988 Rush Hour – Bumper To Bumper
- 1989 Frank Mantooth – Suite Tooth

=== Producer ===
- 1998 Ron Miller – Sleepless (w/ Kevin Patrick & Steve Watkins)
- 2001 George Freeman – At Long Last Love
- 2003 Barbara Sfraga – Under The Moon
- 2011 Giacomo Gates – The Revolution Will Be Jazz: Songs of Gil Scott-Heron
- 2013 Taeko Fukao – Wonderland (w/ Taeko Fukao)
- 2013 Giacomo Gates – Miles Tones
- 2013 Rene Marie – I Wanna Be Evil; With Love to Eartha Kitt (w/ Rene Marie & Quentin Baxter)(Grammy Nominated)
- 2015 Giacomo Gates – Everything Is Cool (w/ Giacomo Gates)
- 2015 Charenee Wade – Offering: The Music of Gil Scott-Heron & Brian Jackson
- 2017 George Freeman – 90 Going On Amazing (w/ Kevin Patrick)
- 2017 Giacomo Gates – What Time Is It (w/ Giacomo Gates)
- 2018 Lauren Henderson – Armame
- 2019 Carolyn Fitzhugh – Living in Peace

== Film/TV ==
=== Music supervisor ===
- 1997 Tangled
- 2004 A War On All Fronts: Life & Times of Robert R. McCormick (WTTW/PBS)
- 2005 Mackinac Island: Mecca of the Midwest (WTTW/PBS)
- 2017 The Drowning

== Awards and nominations ==
Year	Award/Category	Role
2000–01	Midwest Emmy Awards-Winner for Outstanding Achievement for Informational Programming: "Artbeat Chicago/WTTW"	Segment Host
2003–04	Midwest Emmy Awards- Winner- Outstanding Achievement for Informational Programming- "Artbeat Chicago/WTTW- 'Hair Stories'"	Segment Host
2004	Chicago Association of Black Journalists Awards: Excellence in Television Award; "Artbeat Chicago/WTTW"	Segment Host
2007	26th Chicago Music Awards: Lifetime Award of Honor for Contribution to Music Through Media	Individual
2012	31st Chicago Music Awards: Producer of the Year -"The Revolution Will Be Jazz – Songs of Gil Scott Heron" (Giacomo Gates)	Producer
2014	57th Grammy Awards: Nominated for Best Jazz Vocal Album – " I Wanna Be Evil: With Love To Eartha Kitt" (Rene Marie)	Producer
2016	3rd British Jazz FM Awards: Nominated for Album of the Year – "Offering: The Music of Gil Scott-Heron & Brian Jackson" (Charenee Wade)	Producer
2017	21st Jazz Journalist Awards: Marian McPartland/Willis Conover Award for Career Excellence in Broadcasting	Individual
2017	15th JazzWeek: Duke Dubois Humanitarian Award	Individual
2019	Jazzmobile Honoree: NYC Jazz Readers Award	Individual
