= Sikowitz =

Sikowitz is a surname. Notable fictional people with the surname include:

- Sikowitz (Victorious), a character in the sitcom Victorious
- Erin Sikowitz, fictional character in Orange Is the New Black
- Justine Sikowitz, fictional character in the NBC sitcom Superstore
