= Lauren Henderson =

Lauren Henderson may refer to:

- Lauren Henderson (singer) (born 1986), American jazz singer
- Lauren Henderson (writer) (1966–2026), American author who also wrote under the name Rebecca Chance
