= Cat Valentine =

Cat Valentine may refer to a role that Ariana Grande portrays in two different TV shows:

- Cat Valentine (Victorious), a fictional character on the Nickelodeon television series Victorious
- Cat Valentine (Sam & Cat), the same character on the subsequent Nickelodeon television series Sam & Cat
