= Border Crossing (novel) =

Novel by Pat Barker

- First edition cover (Viking)
- Author: Pat Barker
- Language: English
- Genre: Fiction
- Publisher: Viking Press
- Publication date: 2001
- Publication place: United Kingdom
- Media type: Print
- Pages: 215 p.
- ISBN: 9780670878413
- OCLC: 901695700

Border Crossing is a novel written by English author Pat Barker, and first published in 2001.

The novel explores the controversial issue of children who have committed murder, in particular the aftermath after their sentence is served out. A tense psychological thriller, Border Crossing investigates the crimes of particularly violent children, the notion of evil and the possibility of redemption.

== Plot synopsis ==
When Tom Seymour, a child psychologist, plunges into a river to save a young man from suicide, he unwittingly reopens a chapter from his past he had hoped to forget. For Tom already knows the young man as Danny Miller. When Danny was eleven, Tom presented evidence that helped commit him to prison for the murder of the elderly Lizzie Parks. Danny, full of suppressed memory and now free from prison, turns to Tom to help him recount what really happened, and discover the truth.

Reluctantly, Tom is drawn back into Danny's world, a place where the border between good and evil, innocence and guilt are blurred and confused. But when Danny's demands on Tom become extreme, Tom wonders whether he has crossed the line between the professional and personal relationship, speculating upon, but never realising, the perilous danger he is in until it is almost too late.

== Context ==
The events of Border Crossing are quite possibly inspired by a particularly tragic murder case that took place in Britain in 1993. On 12 February of that year, two-year-old James Patrick Bulger was taken from his mother's side whilst in a shopping centre, and suffered ten skull fractures as a result of an iron bar striking his head. His body was then placed on railway tracks and covered with stones. The two murderers were found to be Robert Thompson and Jon Venables, both ten years old.

The case caused considerable controversy both in Britain and worldwide. Just like Danny in Border Crossing, Thompson and Venables were tried and sentenced as adults.

== Plot detail ==
Border Crossing opens with Tom Seymour and his wife Lauren strolling along a deserted river path. They pass the derelict remnants of their decaying neighbourhood, with numerous buildings awaiting demolition or already burnt to the ground, and litter strewn across the path. They stop to observe a young man pause at the edge of a pier, swallow a handful of pills and disappear into the depths of the icy-cold river.

Tom sprints to the boy's aid and, after a moment's hesitation, dives in after him. Struggling with the body, Tom manages to drag the boy back towards the bank of the river through the thick, repugnant mud. The boy, his face covered in a mud mask, is not breathing, so they perform CPR. After Tom detects a pulse, Lauren rushes back to the house to call an ambulance, which arrives promptly. The paramedics establish that the drowned boy is now stable, and they load him into the ambulance to be taken to hospital.

- "... the woman, fair-haired, wearing a beige coat that faded into the gravel, and talking, always talking. Though the red lips move, no sound comes out. He denies her his attention in memory, as he did in life."
- "A second later, the water enclosed [Tom] in a coffin of ice."
- "[Lauren's] eyes were glazed, inward-looking. Like labour, Tom thought, the irony as sour as the mud on his tongue."
- "The boy looked like a baby: purple face, wet hair, that drowned look of the newborn, cast up on to its mother's suddenly creased and spongy belly."

Tom and Lauren arrive back home, and Lauren prepares a hot bath. The couple retreat to bed, for the first time in months not worrying about Lauren's menstrual cycle or pregnancy. Afterwards, Tom deserts a frustrated Lauren and drinks whisky, feeling guilty and inadequate; Lauren had not climaxed.

Tom discovers that he had unknowingly traded coats with the boy he'd rescued, and, realising that his mail and a pair of spare keys were in his coat, he travels to the hospital to retrieve it. The nurse informs Tom that the boy's name is Ian Wilkinson, though the boy introduces himself to Tom as Danny Miller. Danny and Tom have a pre-existing professional relationship; Tom evaluated Danny when he was just ten years old, concluding that Danny could be tried as an adult. Danny had only been released from prison ten months previously, living under the false identity of Ian.

Tom immediately wonders whether their remarkable meeting was chance, or "a dramatic gesture gone badly, almost fatally, wrong."

- "[Tom] was used to switching off, to living his life in separate compartments."
- "He'd learnt to value detachment: the clinician's splinter of ice in the heart."
- "... he'd seen the boy's body hang suspended... an umbilical cord of silver bubbles linking his slack mouth to the air... He was staring at his own death."
- "[Tom] was fed up to the back teeth with being a walking, talking sperm bank."
- "You didn't know who or what he was."
- "I think what we need to let into human affairs is a bit more rationality."
- "... when confronted by a number of disturbing events, the human mind insists on finding a pattern. We can't wait to thread the black beads on to a single string. But some events are, simply, random."

Tom and Lauren have an argument. Despite frequent attempts, Tom is unable to get Lauren pregnant. Tom feels used and inadequate, and Lauren as if her time is running out. Lauren leaves for work for the week, after announcing that she will not be coming home for the following weekend.

Tom reviews past child case histories for a book that he is writing. Michelle, ten years old, had bitten off the nose of her foster mother's natural daughter. Jason, showing no hint of remorse, had lit a fire in which four people had died.

After several hours of research, Tom meets Roddy Taylor, the director of a medium-security child institution, for lunch. Tom tells him about his inability to get Lauren pregnant, although he suspects that, through Lauren and his wife, Roddy already knows this.

- "I'm sick of being a sperm bank. I'm sick of feeling I don't count. What's happened to the... relationship, for God's sake?"
- "Many of the children... he talked to, were preoccupied – no, obsessed – with issues of loyalty, betrayal, justice, rights (theirs), courage, cowardice, reputation, shame. Theirs was a warrior morality, primitive and exacting. Nothing much in common with the values of mainstream society..."
- "Somewhere, in the distance, was a vision of total selfishness, that dreadful, terminal boyishness of men who can't stop thinking of themselves as young."
- "He had no right to blame Lauren for talking about their sexual difficulties, but he did."
- "Somewhere in the back of his mind... was the picture of a rope, fraying, one strand after another coming apart."

Tom reads over the report he'd written many years ago, when he had evaluated a ten-year-old Danny at the remand centre. He'd been unprepared for the sight of such a young boy, knowing that he had committed the murder of an elderly lady named Lizzie Parks.

Tom had spoken softly, asking Danny simple questions to get the session started. After several hours, Tom had established several significant ideas about Danny's emotional maturity. Danny had believed that a person's death was somewhat unimportant, because "thousands of people get killed all the time, all over the world." He had conceded that Lizzie Parks' death was important, but not very, because "she'd had her life." Danny had revealed that he still suffered from the effects of her death, sleeping badly, having nightmares, suffering flashbacks, and that everything around him seemed unreal. All this time, Danny had maintained his innocence. Throughout the session, Tom had observed Danny deliberately mimicking Tom's actions, possibly an early sign of Danny's attempts at manipulation.

As Tom had been about to leave the session, Danny had thrown his arms around Tom, who had been surprised, but hadn't reject the gesture. As Tom had left the building, the warder had remarked to him, "Well, he is a horror, isn't he?" Based upon the results of his evaluation, Tom had decided that Danny possessed a full understanding of death as a permanent state, and had recommended that Danny stand trial for murder in an adult's court.

- "Danny wasn't deceived. He knew the hard questions were coming, and that here too there would be nobody else to answer them."
- "He was an arrogant little bastard."
- "You wring a chicken's neck, you don't expect to find it running round the yard next morning, do you?"
- "The forensic evidence for Danny's guilt was overwhelming, but he was a good liar."
- "A double reflection of the flame appeared in [Danny's] eyes, whose pupils had not contracted, as one would have expected, but grown large, as if starved of light."
- "Could Danny distinguish between fantasy and reality? Did he understand that killing was wrong? Did he understand that death is a permanent state? Was he, in short, capable of standing trial, on a charge of murder, in an adult court? And to all these questions Tom had answered, Yes. Not without doubt, not without qualification, not without many hours of soul searching but, in the end, Yes."

Tom has an unusual dream, beginning with a meeting with his father, who is deceased, and ending with his father's figure morphing into various random objects and a voice whispering, "That's what a great love comes to – a rabbit running between graves."

The following day, Tom visits his mother for lunch, evoking further memories of his father. His mother, still grieving for her husband after several years, denies any difficulties, though Tom observes that she is withering quickly in the absence of physical love.

Before setting off home, Tom visits a pond he used to play in as a child of ten years. He and a friend, Jeff Bridges, had been looking for frog spawn all day, though they had been given the unwanted responsibility of looking after Neil, the four-year-old son of some friends of Jeff's parents.

After playing "piggy in the middle" in the garden for about twenty minutes, they had ignored their parents' warnings and had visited the pond, rumoured to have a flooded well in the centre of it. One of them had placed frog spawn in Neil's Wellington boots, and Neil had panicked, screaming and crying and slowly backing into the depths of the pond. Desperate to keep him quiet, Tom and Jeff had begun to throw stones in Neil's direction, and they had splashed around him.

A man on a bus, glancing up from his paper, had witnessed this spectacle and come to Neil's aid, preventing what might have escalated into an horrific death.

- "It started as a joke. A cruel joke, yes, but still a joke."
- "Jeff threw the first stone. Tom was sure about that. Almost sure."
- "Why did they do it? Because they were frightened, because they shouldn't have been there at all, because they knew they were going to get into trouble, because they hated him, because he was a problem they couldn't solve, because neither could be the first to back down."
- "Three children were saved that day."
- "What interested him was how little sense of responsibility he felt now."
- "In spite of the connecting thread of memory, the person who'd done that was not sufficiently like his present self for him to feel guilt."

Danny arrives at Tom's house for his first planned consultation with Tom, although it is slightly more informal than that. Danny explains his difficulties upon being released from prison. He had met a girl, though had broken it off rather than risking her reaction after finding out about his past. He had also been raped in prison, a startlingly intimate revelation which Tom attributes to Danny's distinct lack of sense of normal social distance and pacing.

Danny details his ambitions of being a teacher, and how the law prohibits him from working with people. Frustrated with his life, Danny had returned to the prison, and Martha Pitt, his parole officer, had collected him from the waiting room.

Danny decides that he wants to continue his consultations with Tom, to understand "what happened and why". He reveals his belief that their meeting was not an accident, but fate, though Tom is still suspicious of the circumstances.

- "Looking through the peephole, he saw Danny, trapped in the distorting glass, like a fish in a bowl."
- "What was back, without effort, without his wanting it even, was the intimacy of that first meeting."
- "Tom kept using words like 'intimacy' and 'closeness' to describe the atmosphere of the meeting, but there'd also been massive antagonism."
- "You see the real question is: can people change?"
- "Danny's face was veiled in smoke."
- "Because in the end you need this as much as I do."

== Characters ==
=== Tom Seymour ===
A child psychologist, and the central character of the third-person narrative, Tom originally proclaimed Danny capable of distinguishing between fantasy and reality, and of understanding the notion of death as a permanent state. Tom's testimony in court effectively ensured that Danny was tried as an adult, despite being only eleven years old, and sentenced to twelve years in juvenile prison for the murder of Lizzie Parks.

Years later, when he next encounters Danny, Tom is also suffering from the breakdown of his marriage to Lauren. Tom feels disconnected from Lauren, and resents being treated as a "sperm bank" in their failed attempts to have children. Their relationship gradually disintegrates throughout the course of the novel, ending with Lauren's asking for a divorce.

=== Danny Miller ===
At age 11, Danny murdered an elderly woman named Lizzie Parks, smothering her with a pillow before "play[ing]" with her deceased body. Based on Tom's testimony in court, Danny was sentenced to be tried as an adult, and served seven years at the Long Garth correctional institute. At the age of 18, Danny was transferred to an adult prison, where he was allegedly harassed and sexually abused.

Upon his release from prison, under the alias Ian Wilkinson, Danny finds it difficult to fit into society.

=== Lauren Seymour ===
As Tom's wife, Lauren plays a small but vital role in the novel. Being unable to conceive by Tom, she feels unsatisfied that she is fulfilling any roles in the marriage. Throughout the novel, we witness the marriage between the two break down due to the couple's inability to conceive a child. Eventually, Lauren feels isolated from Tom, deciding that it is best that she finds another man to achieve her goal of having a child.

=== Dr. Bernard Greene ===
Dr. Bernard Greene is the headmaster of Long Garth correctional institute, where Danny spent the first seven years of his sentence. Tom visits Dr. Greene to learn some vital clues about Danny's past, though he is slightly disappointed with the result. Tom views Greene as a somewhat self-important man, and he responds with disapproval when Greene forces his wife to answer the front door, when he is in a much better position to do so. His wife describes him as being "impervious" to the horrors of the children that he faces each and every day, but this also produces a sense of detachment, and Greene often sees only what he wishes to in people.

=== Elspeth Greene ===
The wife of Bernard Greene, Elspeth Greene also observed Danny for seven years, and also taught him. She offers Tom some insights into Danny's behaviour, labelling him "a bottomless pit" who "hated anything he couldn't control."

=== Angus MacDonald ===
One of Danny's English teachers at Long Garth correctional institute. Despite only teaching Danny for one year, it is Angus who most closely approached the root of Danny's emotional distress: his murder of Lizzie Parks. When Danny accuses Angus of sexually harassing him, Angus is quietly let go.

When Tom visits Angus during a writer's workshop course that he runs, Angus admits that there was never any sexual contact between himself and Danny.

=== Martha Pitt ===
Danny's parole officer, and a good friend of Tom. Despite declaring that he has no interest in entering a relationship with Martha, by the end of the novel, after Tom's marriage has broken down, he and Martha are together.

=== Lizzie Parks ===
The elderly woman whom Danny was convicted of murdering at age eleven.

== Quotes ==
=== About Danny ===
- "Danny didn't do feelings."
- "Danny was a bottomless pit. He wanted other people to fill him, only in the process the other people ended up drained."
- "I think he hated anything he couldn't control."
- "...the horror of the images impossible to connect with the child he'd just left."

=== Crossing borders ===
- "It was extraordinarily distracting: this feeling of a pivotal moment in his own life being played out in front of an uninvited audience."
- "...Tom was aware of a line being crossed."
- "[Danny] was very, very good at getting people to step across that invisible border. Lambs to the slaughter."

=== Mist and fog ===
- "They'd awoken that morning to a curious stillness. Clouds sagged over the river, and there was mist like sweat over the mudflats."
- "[Tom] was less than halfway across the causeway when the mist thickened."

=== Smoke and fire ===
- "The fired burnt furiously, piled high with logs. Danny had dragged the log basket onto the hearth rug and was kneeling beside it, a log in each hand, watching the fire burn."
- "Danny's face was veiled in smoke."

== Release details ==
- 2001, UK, Viking Press
- 2002, UK, Penguin Books

== Film adaptation ==
Stephen Molton and Frank Pugliese wrote the screenplay for the 2017 movie adaptation titled The Drowning, directed by Bette Gordon and scored by Anton Sanko. The film stars Avan Jogia as Danny Miller, Josh Charles as Tom Seymour and Julia Stiles as Lauren Seymour. Other cast members include Tracie Thoms, Leo Fitzpatrick and John C McGinley.
