= Finding Hope Now =

- Directed by: Jennifer Tadlock
- Written by: Skin Mead
- Based on: Gangs to Jobs by Roger Minassian
- Produced by: Skin Mead
- Starring: Stelio Savante; Michael Badalucco; Avan Jogia
- Cinematography: Shane Foster
- Edited by: Mark T. Aro
- Release date: September 9, 2010
- Country: United States
- Language: English

Finding Hope Now is a 2010 Gang/Crime film starring Stelio Savante, Michael Badalucco, Avan Jogia, Rolando Monge and Nick Rey Angelus.

== Cast ==
- Michael Badalucco as Roger Minassian
  - Mick Wingert as Young Roger Minassian
- Avan Jogia as Santos Delgado
- Nick Rey Angelus as Reynaldo Sanchez
- Raymond Castelan as Gabriel
- Deep Rai as Basketball Player
- Heidi Harian as Mrs. Hurtado
- Christopher Maleki as Mr. Delgado
- Danny Mora as Reverend Sergio Martinez
- Tia Texada as Mrs. Villanueva
- Stelio Savante as Ruben
- Sean Michael Thomas as Guy Pushed In Fountain
- Scott Seargeant as Pizza Pit Manager

== Production ==
The film was shot in Fresno, California, principal photography wrapping in June 2009. It is based on Roger Minassian's 2003 book Gangs to Jobs.
