= Door Mouse =

2023 Canadian feature film

- Theatrical release poster
- Directed by: Avan Jogia
- Written by: Avan Jogia
- Produced by: Kyle Mann; Jason Ross Jallet
- Starring: Hayley Law; Famke Janssen; Keith Powers; Donal Logue
- Cinematography: Mike McLaughlin
- Edited by: Ian Macdonald
- Music by: Ketan Jogia
- Production companies: Drive Films; Goldrush Entertainment; Independent Edge Films
- Distributed by: Elevation Pictures
- Release date: January 13, 2023
- Running time: 97 minutes
- Country: Canada
- Language: English

Door Mouse is a Canadian thriller film, directed by Avan Jogia and released in 2023. The film stars Hayley Law as Mouse, a dancer at a burlesque club owned by Mama (Famke Janssen), who begins to investigate the disappearance of her friend and colleague Doe-Eyes (Nhi Do) when she cannot convince Mama or the police to take the matter seriously.

== Cast ==
- Hayley Law as Mouse
- Keith Powers as Ugly
- Famke Janssen as Mama
- Avan Jogia as Mooney
- Gabriel Carter as Craw Daddy
- Elizabeth Saunders as The Dame
- Donal Logue as Eddie Conway
- Michela Cannon as Riz
- Nhi Do as Doe-Eyes
- Dylan Cook as Sweets
- Landon Liboiron as Kelly
- Emma Campbell as Cynthia
- Latoya Webb as Young Girl
- Leo Choy as Louie

== Production ==
Door Mouse was shot in spring 2021 in Sudbury, Ontario.

== Release ==
The film was screened in the Industry Selects program at the 2022 Toronto International Film Festival, before premiering commercially on video on demand platforms in January 2023.

=== Critical reception ===
On the review aggregator website Rotten Tomatoes, 82% of 11 critics' reviews are positive. On Metacritic, the film has a weighted average score of 64 out of 100 based on 4 critics, which the site labels as "generally favorable" reviews.

== Awards ==
At the Vancouver Film Critics Circle Awards 2022, Law was nominated for Best Actress in a Canadian Film.
