= Avan Jogia =

Canadian actor (born 1992)

- Jogia in 2026
- Born: Avan Tudor Jogia; February 9, 1992 (age 34); Vancouver, British Columbia, Canada
- Citizenship: Canada; United Kingdom
- Occupations: Actor; author; director
- Years active: 2006–present
- Partner(s): Halsey (2023–present; engaged)

Avan Tudor Jogia (/ˈævən ˈdʒoʊɡiə/ AV-ən JOHG-ee-ə; born February 9, 1992) is a Canadian actor, author and director. Starting as a child actor, he (Note: Jogia uses both he/him and they/them pronouns interchangeably. This article uses he/him pronouns for consistency.) first received recognition for portraying Danny Araujo in the television film A Girl Like Me: The Gwen Araujo Story (2006). After moving to the United States in his late teens, he landed various roles on television series such as Caprica (2009–2010) and had his breakthrough as Beck Oliver in Victorious (2010–2013).

He has since starred as Danny Desai in the drama series Twisted (2013), Tutankhamun in the miniseries Tut (2015), Roman Mercer in the paranormal action series Ghost Wars (2017–2018) and Ulysses Zane in the comedy series Now Apocalypse (2019). Numerous credits in television and cinema include Spectacular! (2009), Finding Hope Now (2010), Rags (2012), Ten Thousand Saints (2015), I Am Michael (2015) and Zombieland: Double Tap (2019). His directorial debut came in 2011 with the short film Alex. He stars as Leon S. Kennedy in the 2021 film Resident Evil: Welcome to Raccoon City.

In 2011, Jogia co-founded the LGBT online organization Straight But Not Narrow, which seeks to shape the viewpoints of teenagers and adults on matters pertaining to the LGBT community. In 2019, he published his first book, Mixed Feelings, a series of short stories and poems about multiracial identity. He hand painted all the illustrations in the book. His second book of poetry, Autopsy (of an Ex-Teen Heartthrob), was released on February 11, 2025.

Jogia and his brother Ketan make up the band Saint Ivory. They released an album to complement the book also titled Mixed Feelings. Jogia plays guitar, piano, and accordion, as well as singing.

== Early life ==
Avan Tudor Jogia was born on February 9, 1992, in Vancouver, British Columbia, the son of Wendy (née Tudor) and Mike Jogia. His father is a British-Indian, and his mother is of English, German, and Welsh descent. He is the younger brother of Ketan Jogia, a music producer in London.

Besides English, Jogia speaks some Gujarati and French.

According to The Start, Jogia was a student at Killarney Secondary School until age 17 when he left to pursue acting full-time, having already gained a number of small television credits. In an interview, he said that his parents withdrew him from middle school in favor of home schooling. He moved to Los Angeles, California on the trial-basis ultimatum that he would land a role within a six-month period – or return to schooling.

Jogia has cited British actor Tim Curry as one of his early acting inspirations, particularly Curry's role as Long John Silver in the 1996 musical adventure comedy film, Muppet Treasure Island. British actor Sir Ben Kingsley is another of Jogia's inspirations; the two would later appear in the 2015 miniseries Tut, and work together on the 2016 short film Of Dogs and Men.

== Career ==
=== 2006–2013: Caprica and Victorious ===
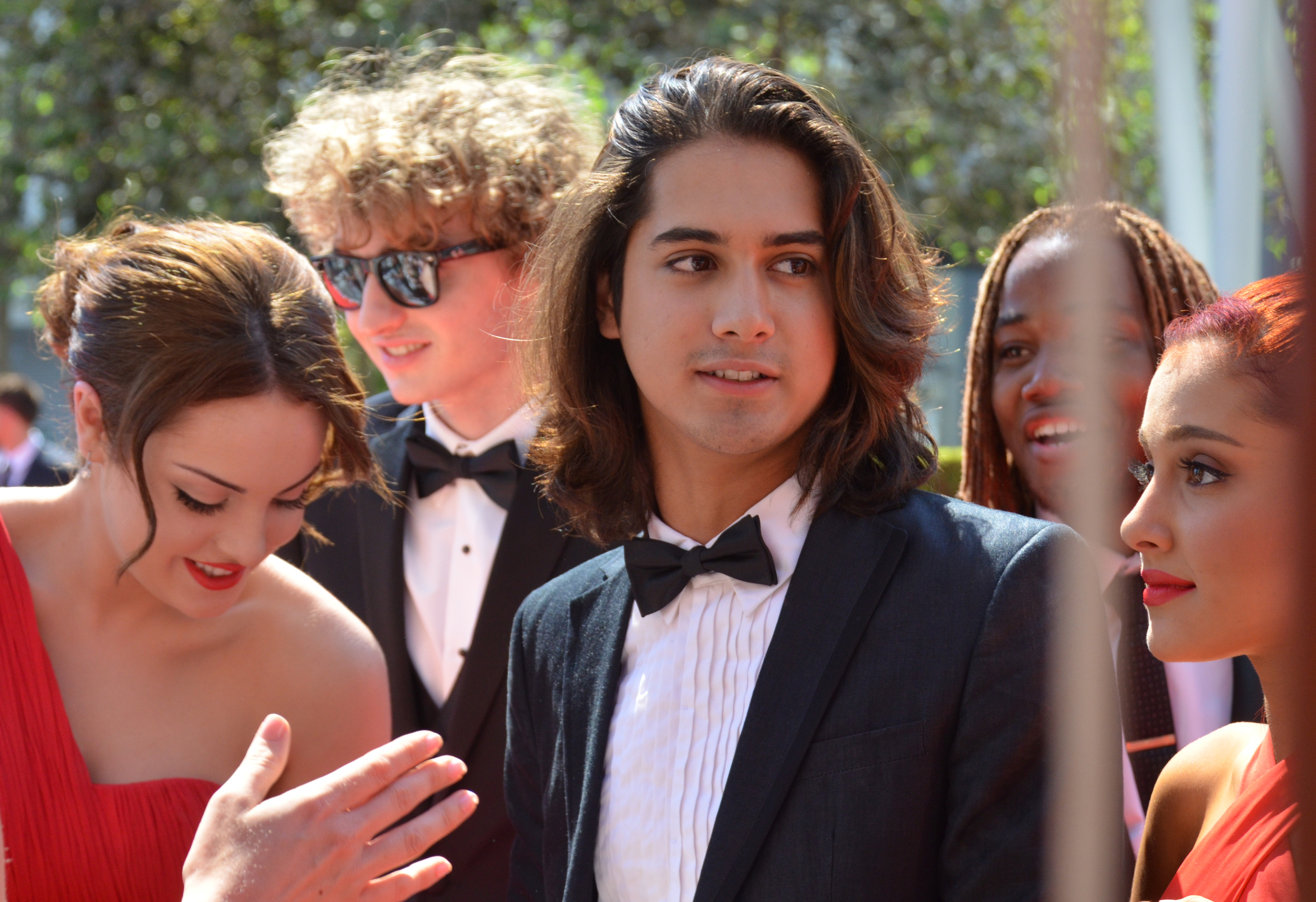
Jogia with the cast of Victorious at the 64th Primetime Creative Arts Emmy Awards, in September 2012.

His first role came in 2006 when he portrayed Danny Araujo–the younger brother of teenage transgender woman Gwen Araujo–in the biographical television film A Girl Like Me: The Gwen Araujo Story, directed by Agnieszka Holland. In 2007, he had a recurring role in The CW television sitcom Aliens in America as the character Sam, and appeared in the Canadian horror television movie Devil's Diary. He next appeared in the 2008 Nickelodeon network original film Gym Teacher: The Movie, as Champ Sinclair, a role opposite Law & Order: Special Victims Unit actor Christopher Meloni. He returned to the network the following year, starring in the 2009 film Spectacular! as Tajid, alongside future Victorious co-star Victoria Justice.

From 2009 to 2010, Jogia had a recurring role in the television series Caprica, a spin-off of Battlestar Galactica, on Syfy. Cast as the role of Ben Stark in August 2008, with production of the series' pilot episode completed by the conclusion of that year. In late 2009, he joined the cast of Nickelodeon television series Victorious. Starring alongside Victoria Justice, Ariana Grande, and Elizabeth Gillies, Jogia played Beck Oliver, the boyfriend of Jade West (played by Gillies). This was the actor's first main role in a television series; a role, which lasted from the series' inception in March 2010, through to the conclusion of the 4th and final season of the show in 2013. Jogia sang background vocals on several cast songs in the show's soundtrack, and had a brief prominent part in the song "Finally Falling" in the episode "Tori the Zombie". Jogia also appeared as Beck in the Nickelodeon film, iParty with Victorious, a Victorious crossover movie with iCarly.

Throughout his tenure on Victorious, Jogia starred in various films. In 2010, he appeared in the drama film Triple Dog, and the gang-crime film Finding Hope Now (filmed back in 2009) as the lead character, Santos Delgado. Jogia later directed and starred in Alex, a short film; this marked his first project he directed. During the following year, he appeared in the 2012 Nickelodeon television movie Rags, along with Keke Palmer and Drake Bell, portraying Finn Covington.

=== 2013–2016: Twisted, Tut and other projects ===
Jogia was cast in the lead role of Danny Desai on the ABC Family mystery–thriller series Twisted (originally titled Socio), in October 2012. The role saw Jogia opposite main cast members Maddie Hasson and Kylie Bunbury, and supporting cast members including Denise Richards, Sam Robards and Kimberly Quinn. The series pilot was greenlit in August 2012, and was filmed in October in New York City. In February 2013, ABC Family ordered the show as a series and production commenced in Studio City the following month, on April 3, 2013. On the themes of the series, Jogia remarked, "Twisted is similar to Pretty Little Liars in that it's about trying to find out who did it, but it's more about the human relationships between characters and the strain that things can put on them. It's also a little bit of a social commentary piece, because it covers very timely issues." The series premiered on June 11, 2013, and ran for 19 episodes; for his role as Desai, Jogia received two nominations at the 2013 and 2014 Teen Choice Awards, in the categories "Summer TV Star: Male" and "Actor: Drama", respectively. ABC Family opted not to renew Twisted for a second season, in August 2014.

In 2014, Jogia was cast in the Spike TV miniseries, Tut, alongside English actor Sir Ben Kingsley. In the lead role of the titular Pharaoh Tutankhamun, Jogia was reunited with Twisted actress Kylie Bunbury, who portrayed Suhad –Tutankhamun's love interest. On the casting of Bunbury, Jogia noted that, "[i]t was cool to be able to work with someone [Bunbury] you have built-in chemistry with. Going into this situation, I had no idea what it was going to be like, so knowing I was taking this on with someone I knew really helped." The miniseries, filmed in Morocco, premiered on Spike on July 19, 2015, and concluded on July 21, 2015.

Jogia returned to cinema after joining the cast of multiple films throughout 2014. In February of that year, Deadline reported that Jogia would star in Ten Thousand Saints, an adaptation of the 2011 novel of the same name by Eleanor Henderson. Released in 2015, the film also starred Asa Butterfield, Hailee Steinfeld and Ethan Hawke. In August 2014, he landed a role in I Am Michael. Based on Benoit Denizet-Lewis' New York Times Magazine article "My Ex-Gay Friend" in 2011, the film's cast includes James Franco, Zachary Quinto and Emma Roberts, along with Jogia who portrays Nico, a gay Buddhist the protagonist (Franco) briefly falls in love with. Principal photography on the film commenced on August 11, 2014, in New York City and concluded later that month. The film was released at the 2015 Sundance Film Festival, before a limited release and through video on demand in January 2017. Later in 2015, Jogia appeared as Dark in the short film, Here Now. Further in 2015, he released a trailer for a horror–thriller short film he directed, entitled Of Dogs and Men. The short film had appearances by Sir Ben Kingsley, who previously worked with Jogia on Tut.

Jogia's next credit was the 1970s–based crime drama film Shangri-La Suite (also known as Killing the King), together with Luke Grimes and Emily Browning. The film follows two young lovers (Grimes and Browning) who go on a journey to Los Angeles with the intent of killing Elvis Presley; Jogia starred as Teijo Littlefoot, an old friend of the protagonist (Grimes), who joins the duo's journey in search of medical transition. The film was released in late 2016. He appeared as Bones, in the 2016 web series short Last Teenagers of the Apocalypse. The four-part series, which was released on April 21, 2016, was produced and directed by Jogia.

=== 2017–present: Films, Now Apocalypse and Mixed Feelings ===
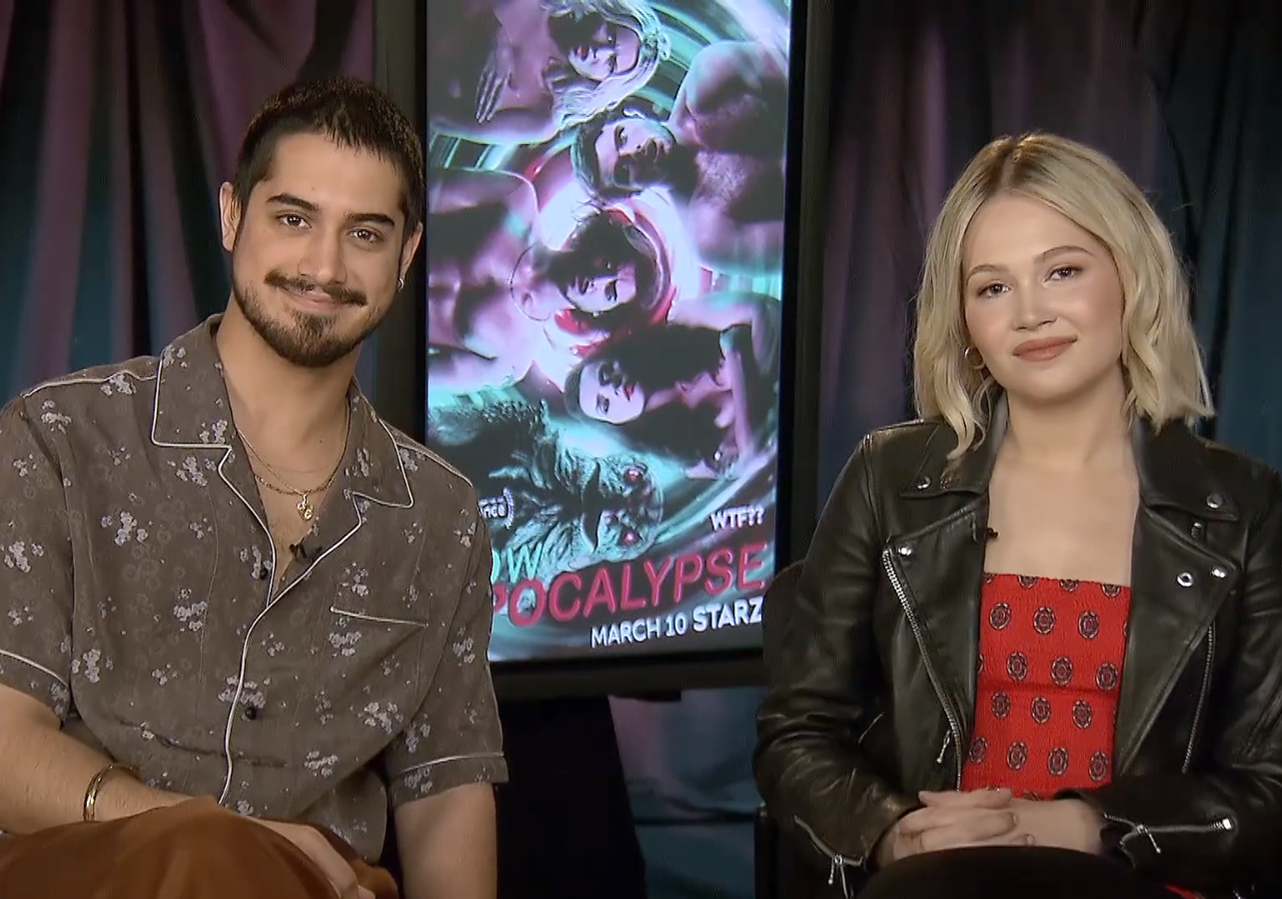
Jogia with Now Apocalypse co-star Kelli Berglund, during an episode of the Valder Beebe Show in March 2019.

In 2017, he starred in the psychological thriller The Drowning (previously, Border Crossing), directed by Bette Gordon, with Julia Stiles and Josh Charles. Adapted from Pat Barker's 2001 novel Border Crossing, Jogia portrayed the central character, Danny, who was rescued from drowning by the man (Charles) who aided his conviction for murder 12 years earlier. Jogia starred in the comedy film The Outcasts, alongside lead actress Victoria Justice. Later, Jogia appeared in The Year of Spectacular Men, a film directed by Lea Thompson. Thompson is the mother of Zoey Deutch, who also appears in the film opposite Jogia. He played Sebastian, the "loving boyfriend" of a movie star (Deutch), followed by a role in A Midsummer Night's Dream, a contemporary film adaptation of the comedy of the same name written by William Shakespeare. Jogia starred in Syfy's 13-episode series titled Ghost Wars that premiered in 2017, and it was filmed in Vancouver, British Columbia, Canada, but it was canceled at the beginning of 2018.

Jogia also landed a co-lead role with Eve Hewson in Rebecca Addelman's directorial debut, Paper Year. Production on the project commenced in October 2016, and was released in 2018. He portrays Matt in the 2018 romantic comedy, The New Romantic, which stars Jessica Barden and Camila Mendes. That year, Jogia was also cast in the upcoming dramatic film The Artist's Wife, together with Bruce Dern and Lena Olin. The film is scheduled to premiere at the Hamptons International Film Festival in December 2019. In June 2018, Jogia was chosen to lead the Starz comedy series Now Apocalypse, alongside Kelli Berglund, Beau Mirchoff, and Roxane Mesquida. Jogia portrayed Ulysses Zane, who, along with his friends "are on various quests pursuing love, sex and fame while navigating the strange and oftentimes bewildering city of Los Angeles." The series, which marked Jogia's second project with writer and director Gregg Araki (after Here Now), aired in March 2019, and was later cancelled after one season. That same year, he appeared in the action comedy Shaft, and had a bigger role, as a laid-back musician, in the sequel Zombieland: Double Tap.

In September 2019, Jogia published a book, Mixed Feelings, on growing up with a mixed-race identity, and whether there is a correlation in the experiences of those of mixed race. The book comprises a series of personal stories and poems about Jogia's life. He noted, "there was a massive appetite for this conversation", and having reached out to his social media following, he "was able to sort of communicate with these people, interview with them, sort of to take parts of their stories [...] and mash them up within the book." He released a follow up to that in 2025 called Autopsy of an Ex-Teen Heartthrob. He started a band with his brother called Saint Ivory in 2018, and released a few songs and one album

== Personal life ==
Jogia describes himself as "spiritual", having spent months as a Buddhist and having roots in Hinduism. Jogia maintains that he has "looked at all kinds of ways of being, because I'm curious about what it takes to be human". Jogia is also a dual citizen of Canada and the United Kingdom.

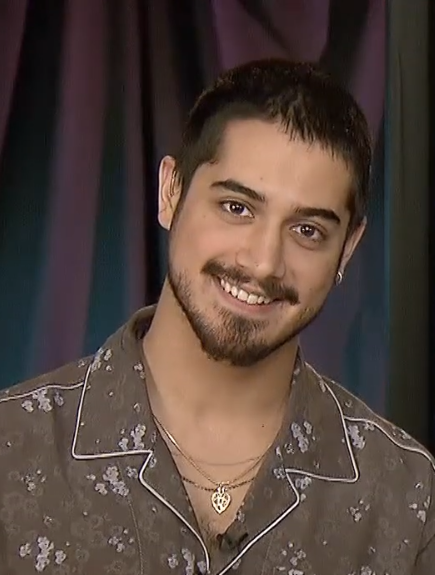
Jogia in 2019.

In a 2019 interview with Attitude, Jogia said he does not feel comfortable labeling his sexuality.

In 2020, Jogia announced he uses both "he/him" and "they/them" pronouns.

=== Relationships ===
In 2012, Jogia began dating Zoey Deutch when they were first spotted attending the Kids' Choice Awards. The couple broke up in 2017 after being together for five years. Jogia dated Cleopatra Coleman from 2017 to 2021. Since 2023, Jogia has been in a relationship with American singer Halsey. Halsey announced their engagement in September 2024.

=== Activism ===
In 2011, Jogia co-founded the online PSA organization Straight But Not Narrow with Heather Wilk and Andre Pochon with the support of fellow actor Josh Hutcherson. The non-profit organization aims to change the attitudes and viewpoints of heterosexuals about the LGBTQIA+ community. Jogia believed that "there was no one making straight youth responsible for their apathy. When you see a bully beating up a kid and you stand idle, that's as loud, or louder, than the actual oppression."

== Filmography ==
Key
†	Denotes films that have not yet been released

=== Film ===
Year	Title	Role	Notes
2010	Triple Dog	Boy Who Records Sarah	
2010	Finding Hope Now	Santos Delgado	
2011	Alex	Alex	Short film; director, executive producer, and writer
2015	Ten Thousand Saints	Teddy McNicholas	
2015	I Am Michael	Nico Gladstone	
2015	Here Now	Dark	Short film
2016	Shangri-La Suite	Teijo Littlefoot	
2016	The Drowning	Danny Miller	
2017	The Outcasts	Dave Quinn	
2017	The Year of Spectacular Men	Sebastian Bennett	
2018	A Midsummer Night's Dream	Puck	
2018	The New Romantic	River Dewan	
2018	Paper Year	Dan Delaney	
2019	Shaft	Karim Hassan	
2019	Zombieland: Double Tap	Berkeley	
2019	The Artist's Wife	Danny	
2021	The Exchange	Stéphane	
2021	Resident Evil: Welcome to Raccoon City	Leon S. Kennedy	
2023	Choose Love	Rex	
2023	Johnny & Clyde	Johnny	
2025	Our Hero, Balthazar	Supes	
2026	Backrooms	Naren Warne	

=== Television ===
Year	Title	Role	Notes
2006	A Girl Like Me: The Gwen Araujo Story	Danny Araujo	Television film
2007	Devil's Diary	Teenage Boy No. 1	Television film
2007	Aliens in America	Sam	Recurring role; 3 episodes
2008	Gym Teacher: The Movie	Champ Townsend	Television film
2009	Spectacular!	Tajid Kalyan	Television film
2009–2010	Caprica	Ben Stark	Recurring role; 3 episodes
2010–2013	Victorious	Beck Oliver	Main role
2011	iCarly	Beck Oliver	Episode: "iParty with Victorious"
2012	Rags	Finn Covington	Television film
2013–2014	Twisted	Danny Desai	Lead role
2015	Ink Master	Himself	Episode: "Tut For Tat"
2015	Tut	Tutankhamun	Lead role
2017–2018	Ghost Wars	Roman Mercer	Lead role
2019	Now Apocalypse	Ulysses Zane	Lead role
2020	The Stranger	J.J.	Main role
2024	Orphan Black: Echoes	Jack	Main role
2026	56 Days	Oliver Kennedy	Main role
2026	Nobody Wants This	Travis	2 episodes

=== Video games ===
Year	Title	Role
2012	Victorious: Time to Shine	Beck Oliver (voice)
2012	Victorious: Taking the Lead	Beck Oliver (voice)

=== Web ===
Year	Title	Role	Notes
2016	Last Teenagers of the Apocalypse	"Bones"	4 episodes; director, writer, and editor
2026	Backrooms	Naren Warne	Episode: "Everything Must Go"

=== Director ===
Year	Title	Notes
2011	Alex	Short film; also executive producer and writer
2016	Of Dogs and Men	Short film; also writer
2023	Door Mouse	Feature directorial debut; also writer

== Discography ==
=== Albums ===
==== With Saint Ivory ====
Title	Album details
Mixed Feelings	Released: February 9, 2020; Label: self-published; Formats: digital download, streaming

=== Singles ===
Year	Single	Album
2018	"Do You Love Me?"	Non-album single
2018	"Loretta"	Non-album single
2020	"Flowerboys"	Mixed Feelings
2020	"Halfbeing"	Mixed Feelings
2020	"Miss Universe"	Mixed Feelings
2023	"We Stay Cool"	Non-album single
2023	"Thank U for Reaching Out"	Non-album single

== Bibliography ==
Year	Title	Type
2019	Mixed Feelings	Stories and Poems
2025	Autopsy (Of an Ex-Teen Heartthrob): Poems of Rage, Love, Sex, and Sadness	Poetry

== Awards and nominations ==
Year	Award	Category	Work	Result
2013	Teen Choice Awards	Summer TV Star: Male	Twisted	Nominated
2014	Teen Choice Awards	Actor: Drama	Twisted	Nominated
