= Christopher Maleki =

American actor and photographer

- Born: February 26, 1964 (age 62); Glendale, California, U.S.
- Occupations: Actor, photographer
- Years active: 1987–present

Christopher Maleki (born February 26, 1964) is an American soap opera actor and photographer. He is best known for portraying the role of Herbert "Spike" Lester on Passions.

== Filmography ==
- Havoc – Zak (uncredited) (2025) (Film)
- Fury – Kettle (uncredited) (2014) (Film)
- 300: Rise of an Empire – Reza (uncredited) (2014) (Film)
- Supah Ninjas – X (2011) (TV)
- Finding Hope Now – Mr. Delgado (2010) (Film)
- Iron Man 2 – Reporter (uncredited) (2010) (Film)
- I Love You, Man – Buddy #5 (uncredited) (2009) (Film)
- Igor – Killiseum Fan #6 (voice) (uncredited) (2008) (Film)
- Beverly Hills Chihuahua – Yikes (uncredited) (2008) (Film)
- Offside: The Price of Dreams – Dr. Shafian (2006) (Film)
- Passions – Herbert "Spike" Lester (10 March 2005 to 7 January 2008) (TV)
- Tears of a Clown – Bob Grossman (2005)(Film)
- McBride: It's Murder, Madam – Jorge (2005) (TV)
- Mojave – Voice Over (2004) (Film)
- Fossil – Josh Milland (2004) (Film)
- Power Rangers: Wild Force – "The Soul of Humanity" – Worker #1 (as Chris Maleki) (2002) (TV)
- Port Charles – Ben Shapour (2001) (TV)
- Children of Heaven – Sugar seller (1997) (Film)
- Shock 'Em Dead - Dustin (1991) (Film)
- Sea of Love – Detective (uncredited) (1989) (Film)
- Less than Zero – Guy at Party (uncredited) (1987) (Film)
- Can't Buy Me Love - Frat Guy (uncredited) (1987) (Film)
