= Hayley Law =

Canadian actress, singer (b. 1992)

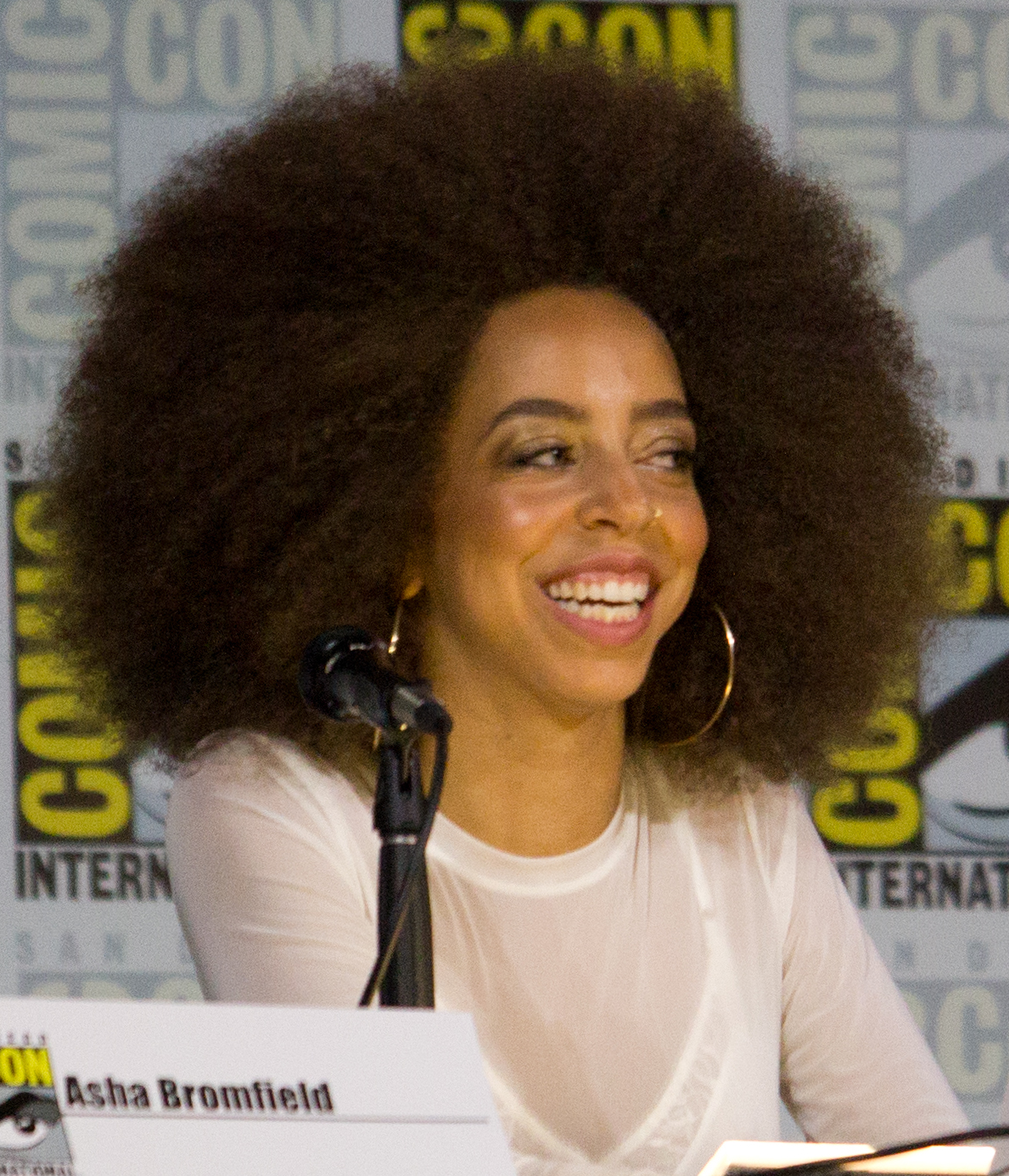
- Law at San Diego Comic-Con in July 2017
- Born: November 18, 1992 (age 33); Vancouver, British Columbia, Canada
- Occupation: Actress • singer
- Years active: 2017–present

Hayley Law (born November 18, 1992) is a Canadian actress and singer, known for her portrayal of Valerie Brown in the CW drama series Riverdale, Lizzie Elliot in the Netflix science fiction series, Altered Carbon, and Tess in the dark comedy film Spontaneous.

== Early life and career ==
Law was born on November 18, 1992, in Vancouver, British Columbia, Canada. She made her acting debut in a recurring role as Valerie Brown on the CW drama series Riverdale. She followed with roles in TV shows and movie, including The Arrangement, Stickman, The New Romantic and Netflix's Altered Carbon.

== Filmography ==
=== Film ===
Year	Title	Role	Notes
2018	The New Romantic	Nikki Morrison	
2020	Spontaneous	Tess	
2020	Echo Boomers	Allie Tucker	
2021	Mark, Mary & Some Other People	Mary	
2022	Door Mouse	Mouse	
2024	She Taught Love	Candice	

=== Television ===
Year	Title	Role	Notes
2017–2018, 2021	Riverdale	Valerie Brown	Recurring role, 15 episodes (season 1-2); special guest star (season 5)
2017	The Arrangement	Vena	Episode: "The Leak"
2017	Stickman	Emma	TV movie
2018–2020	Altered Carbon	Lizzie Elliot	Recurring role

== Discography ==
- Hayleau (EP) – (2016)
