= The New Romantic =

- Theatrical release poster
- Directed by: Carly Stone
- Written by: Carly Stone
- Story by: Kyle Mann; Carly Stone
- Produced by: Jonathan Bronfman; Jason Ross Jallet; Michael Risley; Kyle Mann
- Starring: Jessica Barden; Hayley Law; Brett Dier; Avan Jogia; Timm Sharp; Camila Mendes
- Cinematography: Mike McLaughlin
- Edited by: Christine Armstrong
- Music by: Matthew O'Halloran
- Production companies: Drive Films; Jobro Productions; Notario; Independent Edge Films
- Distributed by: Elevation Pictures
- Release dates: March 11, 2018 (SXSW); October 19, 2018 (Canada)
- Running time: 101 minutes
- Country: Canada
- Language: English

The New Romantic is a 2018 Canadian romantic comedy-drama film, written and directed by Carly Stone.

The film stars Jessica Barden as Blake Conway, a journalism student whose romance column receives attention when she begins to write about her experiences as a sugar baby. The film also stars Hayley Law, Brett Dier, Avan Jogia, Timm Sharp and Camila Mendes.

The film had its world premiere at South by Southwest on March 11, 2018. It received a limited release in Canada on October 19, 2018, by Elevation Pictures.

== Plot ==
Blake is a student journalist who writes a column about her love life, The Hopeless Romantic, for her school paper. After her latest column her editor, River, cancels her column for being too dull, but offers to re-instate it if she came come up with more interesting material.

On a night out with her roommate and best friend Nikki, Blake mistakenly has her ID swapped with the ID of another student. Blake goes to return the ID and meets Morgan who is with an older man. Morgan urges Blake to stay, revealing that she is a sugar baby and the man she is with will pay Blake to stay. Blake declines.

At an editorial meeting the following day Blake learns that fellow journalist Jacob is applying for an award for Gonzo journalism and is being supported by River. Jealous, Blake decides to interview Morgan about her experiences as a sugar baby. Morgan takes Blake to a pool party where Blake meets Ian, a wealthy older professor. Ian propositions Blake about being his sugar baby but she politely turns him down. Blake writes about the experience for the paper but while River is interested in the material he refuses to give Blake her column back until she points out that it sounds like he is trying to pimp her out in return for her column.

Blake and Nikki attend a costume party where Blake shows up as Raoul Duke and is surprised to see Jacob dressed up as the same. Blake takes Jacob home, but their attempt to have sex ends when Jacob does not have a condom. Blake writes about their failed hookup for her column, to Jacob's horror.

After weighing Ian's offer, Blake decides to go on a date with him with her primary motivation being her desire to compete with Jacob for the journalism award. On their first date Blake has sex with Ian. She initially believes that she received nothing in return, however Ian gifts her a scooter after stealing her bike. Blake begins writing about her experiences with Ian and her column becomes a hit. When Jacob questions the ethics of her decision to write about Ian, Blake points out her column is anonymous.

Blake continues to date Ian and despite initially asking him for nothing eventually asks him to write her a recommendation letter for the journalism award which he agrees to do.

One afternoon when Blake is high on MDMA after having accidentally ingested a laced cupcake prepared by Nikki, Ian turns up with a diamond bracelet asking her to attend a wedding with him. Blake accompanies Ian and realizes that the wedding is that of Morgan's sugar daddy. The groom accosts her after the wedding and tells her that he is interested in having sex with her. Blake ends up running away from the wedding without telling Ian.

Disturbed by what happened at the wedding Blake begins to question her relationship with Ian and struggles to understand how it is different from prostitution. At dinner Blake tries to connect with Ian but he refuses to answer personal questions. The night ends with them having sex despite Blake's reluctance. Upset after their night together, Blake goes for some air and is locked outside. Wandering home she finds the bike which Ian took from her after their first night together. She rides home dressed only in a bedsheet but blends in with other students returning from a toga party. She runs into Jacob who, seeing she's upset, takes her out to breakfast where the two bond over being the children of divorced parents.

Returning home Blake is confronted by Ian who has finally read the writing sample she sent him and discovered she is documenting their relationship. He threatens to ruin her career if she doesn't take the column down and withdraws his recommendation letter for the award.

Reflecting on what to do Blake decides to sell the jewellery Ian gave her and refuses to take down the column. While both Blake and the men featured in her column were always anonymous she decides to publish her final column under her real name as she is not ashamed of her experiences.

Heading to graduation, Blake receives a message from Jacob urging her to meet him at the bleachers. There, Jacob does a poor reenactment of the final scene of Sleepless in Seattle which he watched after learning that Nora Ephron was Blake's favourite writer. Blake appreciates the gesture and the two kiss before joining their friends for graduation.

== Cast ==
- Jessica Barden as Blake Conway
- Hayley Law as Nikki Morrison
- Brett Dier as Jacob
- Camila Mendes as Morgan Cruise
- Timm Sharp as Ian Brooks
- Avan Jogia as River Dewan
- Greg Hovanessian as College Bro
- Vinnie Bennett as Banker Andrew
- Darren Eisnor as Conrad

== Production ==
The film was shot in Sudbury, Ontario in the fall of 2017.

== Release and reception ==
The film had its world premiere at South by Southwest on March 11, 2018. where it won a special jury citation for Best First Feature. Shortly after, The Orchard acquired US distribution rights to the film. It also screened at Cinéfest Sudbury International Film Festival on September 19, 2018.

It was released in Canada on October 19, 2018, and in the United States on November 9, 2018.

On review aggregator Rotten Tomatoes, the film holds an approval rating of 61% based on 31 reviews, with an average rating of 5.9/10. The website's critics consensus reads: "The New Romantic doesn't quite achieve the level of storytelling sophistication it aspires to, but Jessica Barden's performance elevates this enjoyable rom-com with a twist." On Metacritic, the film has a weighted average score of 55 out of 100, based on ten critics, indicating "mixed or average reviews".
