= Lauren Henderson (singer) =

American singer (born 1986)

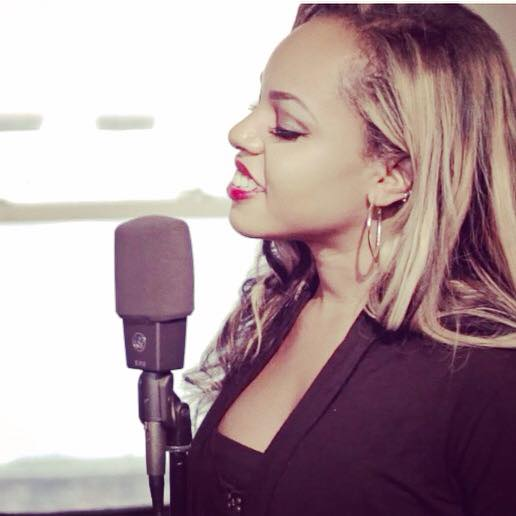

Background information
- Born: November 5, 1986 (age 39); Marblehead, Massachusetts
- Genres: Latin jazz
- Occupation: Singer-songwriter
- Years active: 2011–present
- Label: Brontosaurus
- Website: Official site

Lauren Henderson (born November 5, 1986, in Marblehead, Massachusetts) is an American jazz singer based in New York and Miami. She has released eleven albums and one EP through her label Brontosaurus Records.

== Early life and education ==
As a child, Henderson sang in both church and school choirs. She attended Wheaton College, where she studied Music and Hispanic Studies. She later earned an Executive Master of Business Administration degree from Brown University and the IE Business School in Spain. She also studied abroad in Mexico and Spain, studying traditional music and flamenco singing and dance. She later moved to New York and studied with Paquito D'Rivera, Barry Harris, and Jane Monheit. Henderson releases music through her own label, Brontosaurus Records.

== Career ==
In 2011, she released her self-titled debut album. Her second album, A La Madrugada, which she produced and arranged, was released in 2015. It peaked at 90 on the JazzWeek charts. The song "Accede" from the album appeared in the film The Drowning. In March 2018, she released the album Ármame, which charted in the JazzWeek Top 40. In October 2018, Henderson released the EP Riptide. She released the album Alma Oscura in June 2019. The album debuted at #25 on the JazzWeek chart for the week of July 29, 2019. Henderson's song "El Ritmo" was featured in El Juego de Las Llaves. Two songs by Hendeson were featured in a production of the play Romeo y Julieta, "Alma Oscura" and "Ven Muerte". Her 2020 album, The Songbook Session, placed in the JazzWeek charts Top 5, and Top 50 year end chart. She also released a holiday album that year titled Classic Christmas. Henderson's album Musa was released on June 11, 2021.

== Discography ==
=== Studio albums ===
Title	Details
Lauren Henderson	Released: 2011; Label: Brontosaurus Records; Format: CD, digital download, streaming
A La Madrugada	Released: 2015; Label: Brontosaurus Records; Format: CD, digital download, streaming
Armame	Released: 2018; Label: Brontosaurus Records; Format: CD, digital download, streaming
Alma Oscura	Released: 2019; Label: Brontosaurus Records; Format: CD, digital download, streaming
The Songbook Session	Released: 2020; Label: Brontosaurus Records; Format: CD, digital download, streaming
Classic Christmas	Released: 2020; Label: Brontosaurus Records; Format: CD, digital download, streaming
Musa	Released: 2021; Label: Brontosaurus Records; Format: CD, digital download, streaming
La Bruja	Released: 2022; Label: Brontosaurus Records; Format: CD, digital download, streaming
Conjuring	Released: 2023; Label: Brontosaurus Records; Format: CD, digital download, streaming
Sombras	Released: 2024; Label: Brontosaurus Records; Format: CD, digital download, streaming
Sonidos	Released: 2025; Label: Brontosaurus Records; Format: CD, digital download, streaming

=== Extended plays ===
Title	Details
Riptide	Released: 2018; Label: Brontosaurus Records; Format: CD, digital download, streaming
