= Giacomo Gates =

American jazz vocalist

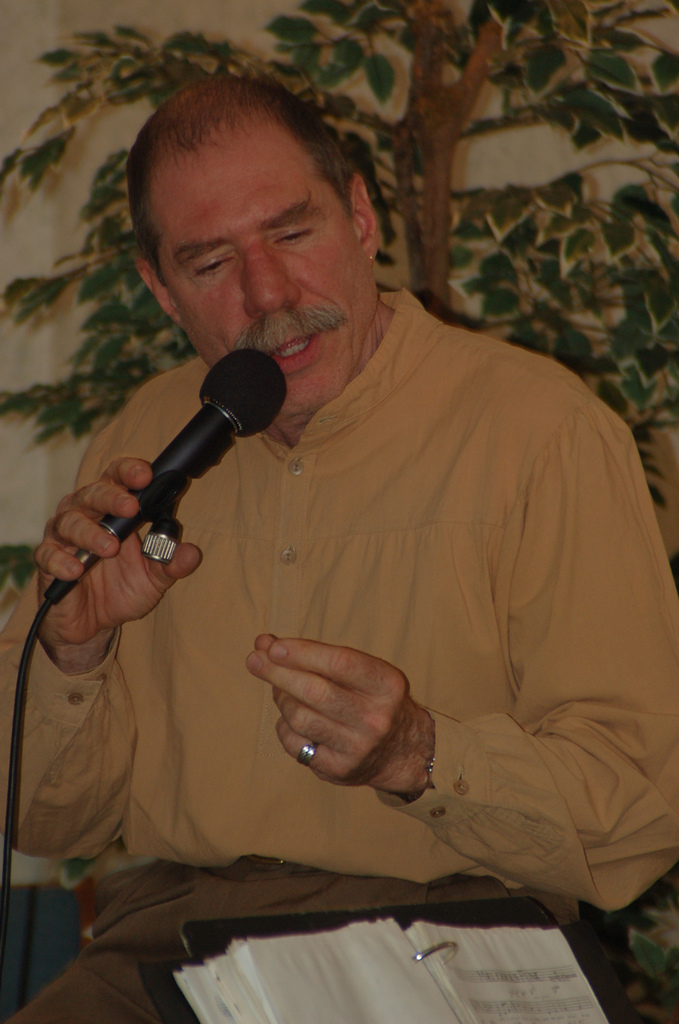

Background information
- Born: September 14, 1950 (age 76); Connecticut, U.S.
- Genre: Vocal jazz
- Occupations: Vocalist, educator
- Years active: 1990–
- Labels: DMP, Sharp Nine, Savant
- Website: www.giacomogates.com

Giacomo Gates (born September 14, 1950) is an American jazz vocalist.

== Career ==
Gates was born and raised in Connecticut. His father was a classical violinist. He made his public debut as a vocalist at the age of six. Soon after, he picked up guitar. In his youth he listened to jazz stations broadcasting from New York City, learned about jazz from disc jockeys, and played along on guitar. When he was ten, he bought his first jazz album, Time Out by Dave Brubeck. Between radio and his record collection, he listened to many of the biggest names in jazz. He took a particular interest in vocalists, such as Perry Como, Bing Crosby, Sammy Davis Jr., Dean Martin, Frank Sinatra. As he got older, he admired Mose Allison, Cab Calloway, Betty Carter, Babs Gonzales, Al Hibbler, Eddie Jefferson, Lambert, Hendricks & Ross, Carmen McRae, Mark Murphy, Anita O'Day, Louis Prima, Martha Raye, Keely Smith, Sarah Vaughan, and Joe Williams.

After graduating from high school, he went to college but dropped out after a year. He found work on a road crew as a laborer, then drove dump trucks and heavier vehicles like bulldozers. Gates moved to Alaska to work on the Alaska Pipeline, intending to stay only a year but remaining for twelve. While performing at a jazz festival in Fairbanks, he was approached by Sarah Vaughan, who encouraged him to leave Alaska and pursue a singing career. In 1990, at the age of forty, he moved back to Connecticut. Five years later, he released his first album, Blue Skies (DMP, 1995).

Gates interprets jazz standards, practices vocalese, and is active in jazz education. He has taught at Wesleyan University, the Hartford Conservatory of Music, and New Haven's Neighborhood Music School. In his singing he tries to copy the sounds of instruments, such as flutes, trombones, and drums.

== Discography ==
- Blue Skies (DMP, 1995)
- Fly Rite (Sharp Nine, 1998)
- Centerpiece (Origin, 2004)
- Luminosity (Doubledave Music, 2007) CD+DVD
- The Revolution Will Be Jazz: The Songs of Gil Scott-Heron (Savant, 2011)
- Miles Tones: Giacomo Gates Sings the Music of Miles Davis (Savant, 2013)
- Everything Is Cool (Savant, 2015)
- What Time Is It? (Savant, 2017)
- You (Savant, 2022)
