= List of Victorious characters =

This is a list of characters from the Nickelodeon sitcom Victorious. The series centers on Tori Vega, a student of Hollywood Arts who gets into unpredictable situations with her friends. Victorious was created by Dan Schneider, who also serves as executive producer.

== Main characters ==
=== Tori Vega ===
Victoria "Tori" Vega (portrayed by Victoria Justice) is a sophomore and the younger sister of Trina Vega and attends Hollywood Arts, a performing arts high school, along with her.

When Trina experiences an allergic reaction to a Chinese herb gargle to try to make her voice sound better, Trina's tongue gets swollen right before a big showcase at school. She is volunteered by Andre Harris to take her place, since she knew how the piece was meant to be performed as well as all the lyrics. Tori performs "Make It Shine", which is the theme song, and everyone is impressed with her performance, including Principal Eikner, who offers her an enrollment to the school. She accepts it and is admitted to Hollywood Arts. Initially feeling out of place at Hollywood Arts, Tori makes new friends and becomes more comfortable. From there, the show details Tori's journey through school as she gets into unusual situations have differences and adventures with her friends. She is one of the favorite students of her teacher, Sikowitz.

She is depicted as creative, kind, caring, forgiving, responsible, positive, easy-going, and friendly, though she can be sneaky, blunt and vindictive, going as low as to manipulate her friends and family, especially her older sister, Trina, but she will always do the right thing in the end. Tori is shown to care for her friends and family a lot and is willing to help them when she is hesitant to.

Tori is friends with Andre Harris, Beck Oliver, Cat Valentine, and Robbie Shapiro. She often tries to be nice to Jade and sometimes describes Jade as her friend, even though Jade herself does not. In some episodes, they seem to be moving towards becoming friends, although most of the time, Jade seems to be "frenemies" with Tori.

In later episodes, Tori is shown to wear glasses when at home and at school, she wears contacts.

She, or another student resembling her, can be seen together with Andre, Beck, Robbie, Jade or people resembling them in the Sam & Cat episode "#MommaGoomer", as Sam and Cat go to Hollywood Arts in order to ask Sikowitz for help.

=== Andre Harris ===
Andre Harris (portrayed by Leon Thomas III) is a sophomore and Tori's best friend and mentor at Hollywood Arts. Andre is an aspiring musician who loves to perform and write his songs. He can play many instruments, including the guitar, keyboard, piano, and the French horn, but prefers the keyboard and piano. Andre takes his music seriously and is usually seen playing at all of Tori's performances. He is a talented singer and songwriter, having co-written nearly every song Tori has performed. He also often gets Tori to be a backup singer for him at his performances.

Andre is shown to be witty and kind and Tori often relies on him for support in her time of need, and he is always there for her, although he is easily distracted at times. Tori often asks him for help or advice. He also likes to make jokes, but none of the other characters find him humorous.

Andre has a grandmother who is mentally unstable. He also has a cousin who works as an actor, and an uncle who is a real estate agent, who once sold a house to Kenan Thompson.

In "Jade Gets Crushed", Andre develops feelings for Jade after they work together on a song for a project for one of Andre's classes and he hears Jade sing beautifully. At the end of the episode, Andre tells Tori that it seems that he is breaking up with Jade, but his former crush on Jade is mentioned again in "Tori Fixes Beck and Jade".

In "Tori Goes Platinum", it is revealed by Andre that singer Bruno Mars is one of his influences to being a musician when he tells Tori, Cat and Jade at Mason Thornesmith's office that he saw Bruno Mars in the men's room and says that Mars is one of his idols.

=== Robbie Shapiro ===
Robbie Shapiro (portrayed by Matt Bennett) is a sophomore and is one of Tori's friends at Hollywood Arts. He speaks along with a puppet, Rex Powers, whom he and all others speak to as if it were an actual person. Robbie is a skilled ventriloquist, but he was uncredited for his talent until the episode "Freak the Freak Out". In the episode, Robbie does not understand why he was referred to as a "ventriloquist", which either jokingly indicates that Rex has a mind of his own and is not controlled by Robbie whatsoever or (in a more serious matter) that Robbie has schizophrenia, therefore considering Rex a real person. He is said to have had Rex since he was little and they are almost always seen together. Robbie personifies Rex, which leads to many arguments about Rex's true sentience. He constantly argues that Rex is not a puppet or dummy when told otherwise. Robbie is close to Rex and affectionate towards him, though Rex ridicules him often.

Robbie is considered shy and nerdy, but a good, loyal, and honest friend to others. Robbie has a great deal of trouble with relationships and attracting girls. Robbie is also in love with Cat Valentine, which is proven in the episode "The Blonde Squad" in which Robbie writes and sings the song 'I Think You're Swell' for her. The song is about what a great person she is, and how they get along so well, and that she is all he thinks about. She, however, does not appear to get the true feelings behind it, though she does appear to greatly enjoy the song. He is also shown to be the only one who knows Cat's full name, Caterina. He does not seem to have a sense of privacy. His only relative who has ever been seen is his grandmother. Robbie is intolerant to gluten, otherwise known as Celiac Disease. It is revealed in the episode 'Wok Star' that Robbie is Jewish because he spent his Bar Mitzvah money on leather pants and male make-up. He is also mistaken for a girl in a couple of episodes such as 'Locked Up!', in which he is in a completely different situation in jail in a foreign country.

Robbie later makes guest appearances in the spin-off series Hollywood Arts, where he is revealed to be a teacher and is reteconned to have a crush on Tori's older sister, Trina Vega, who later returns his feelings.

==== Rex Powers ====
Rex Powers (physically portrayed by a ventriloquist dummy named Christopher Cane, performed by Matt Bennett, voiced by an uncredited Jake Farrow) is Robbie's alter ego, who is a dummy that Robbie carries around everywhere. Robbie has had Rex since he was young. Since Robbie is too shy to speak for himself most of the time, he talks as Rex, using him to voice his actual feelings and thoughts. The others treat Rex as a real person, and both Rex and Robbie dislike it when Rex is called a 'dummy' or 'puppet'. Rex is obsessed with 'Northridge Girls', dumb, talentless and 'easy' girls from a Los Angeles neighborhood.

In "Rex Dies" he gets sucked into a wind machine and is taken to a hospital, even though he is a dummy. Rex is shown to have a huge crush on Tori and constantly flirts with her, though she is annoyed by his affection. Robbie often turns to Rex for advice and insight, though Rex's advice is almost always off-beat. Rex is sarcastic and mean, especially to Robbie, though it is shown that neither can stay without the other.

In the first 3 seasons, Rex is always in Robbie's company. In season 4 for unexplained reasons, Robbie is frequently seen without Rex. Part 2 of 'Freak the Freak Out' was the first episode not to feature Rex.

In 2011, Rex's in-universe actor Christopher Cane hosted a bloopers episode of Victorious titled "Blooptorious" in which he interviewed cast members and showed outtakes from the series. In the episode, Cane is not accompanied by Robbie. He also mentions that, prior to being offered the role of Rex in Victorious, he was almost given the role of Spencer Shay in iCarly, but was ultimately not chosen in favor of Jerry Trainor, whom he hates for that reason, as well as because Trainor is dating his ex-girlfriend. Cane also hosted a 2011 blooper episode of iCarly titled "iBloop 2: Electric Bloopaloo".

Rex later had a guest appearance at the end of the 2015 Game Shakers episode 'Tiny Pickles' (Season 1, Episode 5) where he is a truck driver.

=== Jade West ===
Jade West (portrayed by Elizabeth Gillies) is a sophomore and is the vicious frenemy of Tori from Hollywood Arts. She has a gothic sense of style—always wearing dark clothes (as she's known to dislike color) with eyebrow piercings and different colors of streaks in her hair, and is the long-time girlfriend of Beck Oliver. She is very possessive and sometimes controlling of her boyfriend and is known to lash out at anyone who she views as a threat to their relationship. She shows very little affection for anyone.

In the pilot episode, Jade believes that Tori is flirting with Beck and quickly views her as her enemy, so she later pours coffee onto Tori's head during an acting class to get "revenge". Tori later gets even with her by defeating her in an alphabetical improv game and kissing Beck as they were the only two actors remaining in the scene which leads further into their feud.

Jade has been known to take obsession in triumphing over any enemies or rivals she may find, and occasionally has been known to take an interest in bizarre, dark, or unusual things that usually would repulse or frighten other people. She has a fascination with scissors, as she is sometimes seen holding scissors and her locker is decorated with them, and her favorite movie is "The Scissoring".

In "Ice Cream for Ke$ha", it is revealed that her childhood was a dark and unhappy one, claiming her favorite play toy being a hammer and scissors, and that she had been raised by an unsupportive and similarly emotionless father and a mother she could not emotionally connect with. She is also seen to be an amazing singer and actress, which are the main talents that got her into Hollywood Arts. In the season 1 episode "Jade Dumps Beck", it is revealed that they had been dating for nearly two years. However, they break up in the episode "The Worst Couple" after non-stop fighting, although it becomes clear that Jade still has feelings for him. After taking some time apart, the two make amends in the episode "Tori Fixes Beck and Jade" when Jade sings a song that is implied to be dedicated to Beck, leading them to admit that they have missed each other and get back together.

Jade later appeared in the Sam & Cat episode "#TheKillerTunaJump" where she ends up meeting Sam Puckett and befriending her, whereas Cat had thought that the two girls would kill each other upon first sight due to their similar personalities. It is Sam and Jade's friendship that makes Cat jealous enough to call Freddie Benson to Los Angeles so that she can flirt with him, resulting instead in Sam briefly becoming Robbie Shapiro's girlfriend.

=== Cat Valentine ===
Catarina Valentine (portrayed by Ariana Grande) is a sophomore and is Tori's eccentric friend from Hollywood Arts. She is fun, energetic, and at times oblivious. In a video on TheSlap, she reveals that her full first name is Catarina, but only her grandmother calls her by her full name. It was also revealed by Robbie in "The Blonde Squad" when he yelled "Catarina Valentine, I will not sit here anymore and listen to you talk bad about yourself!" She is relatively friendly and liked by all of the students. She is sweet, naive, bubbly and happy, often unsuspecting of what is going on around her. She is very unlike to a human and has a very short attention span, so she can easily be distracted with colorful items by the others when they want her out of the way. She can be somewhat of a drama queen and does not take criticism very well. She often screams "What's that supposed to mean!?" when offended, which is very often and has become her catchphrase. Cat often says random and strange things which leaves the others, especially Jade, confused or annoyed.

Cat is also an extremely talented singer and actress, as seen in "Freak The Freak Out" where she sings a duet with Jade, and in the crossover episode "iParty with Victorious" where she shows a high vocal range. A running gag of the series is Cat often telling her friends or strangers about her brother, who seems to have many unnatural problems, all of which Cat does not seem to find strange or abnormal. She has bright red hair that she dyed to resemble her favorite snack, a red velvet cupcake. Andre's nickname for her is "Little Red", which she took offense to at first, but then called it "creative". She is occasionally seen carrying stuffed animals. Throughout the series, she has become ditzier and over the top, with a higher-pitched voice and more abnormal conversations.

In January 2013 in the episode "Star-Spangled Tori", Cat's parents move away to Idaho to be with her mentally ill brother at a mental institution for between six months and two years where the doctors can make sure he receives much mental relaxation and cannot escape and keep him institutionalized. Her parents couldn't take her as it was in the middle of the school year and wanted her to stay in Los Angeles and sent to her Uncle Walter and Aunt Pearl, while they are in Idaho but according to Cat, they are very mean. They do not like her red hair, they only eat vegetables, they said she cannot have unlimited texting, and they will not let her flush the toilet unless it is "necessary". This caused Cat to run away and take refuge in the attic of Hollywood Arts' BlackBox theater, where her living habits were discovered by Robbie and Jade. After Jade called up Cat's parents, Cat goes to live with her grandmother – who turned out to be living in Venice, California and not Venice, Italy as Cat had initially thought – until her parents and brother return. She refers to her grandmother as "Nona".

After Victorious aired its final season, Cat becomes a co-lead character on the crossover spin-off Sam & Cat, a sitcom that began airing in 2013 and concluded in 2014. Sam and Cat become roommates when Cat's Nona (portrayed by Maree Cheatham) goes to live in Elderly Acres. Sam and Cat previously met each other in the 2011 iCarly crossover episode "iParty with Victorious", but neither of them made many contacts. In the spin-off, Sam officially meets Cat after saving her from the garbage truck. The next day, Sam and Cat set up a babysitting service to raise some extra cash after watching some kids. Sam and Cat's home is stated to be "the poshest apartment in the building".

=== Beck Oliver ===
Beck Oliver (portrayed by Avan Jogia) is a sophomore and is Jade's boyfriend. He has been together with Jade for over two years and, unlike everyone else, is completely unafraid of her (even laughing when Andre admitted to being scared of her) and often likes to tease and make her jealous because of her reactions, which he finds amusing. Beck seems to be the only one who can calm Jade down when she becomes angry and has some control over her as seen throughout the series.

Beck is seen as soft-spoken, friendly, laid back, modest, open and caring. Although he is shown to get annoyed and even lose his temper, usually by Robbie or Trina, he is normally calm and collected. Because of his good looks and personality, he is possibly the most popular guy at Hollywood Arts and attracts almost all females and girls like Trina, sometimes even older women. He seems to be aware of the effect he has on girls, sometimes using his looks to his advantage. He and Andre are close friends. His school locker is transparent, which is his way of saying that he has no secrets, which is revealed to Tori when she was attempting to find a decorative idea for her locker. He lives in a trailer that is parked in his parents' driveway, being told if he lived with them then he would have to go by their rules, and he stated "my roof, my rules". Beck grew up in Canada before moving to Los Angeles.

It is shown in "Beck Falls for Tori" and "iParty with Victorious" that Beck has never felt true terror, nor has he ever been scared by anything, a fact backed up by Jade who calls him "unscareable". He usually tries to keep peace in the group and hold everyone together. Beck breaks up with Jade in the season 3 episode "The Worst Couple" after getting tired of constantly fighting with her. In the episode "Tori Goes Platinum" Beck tries to kiss Tori, revealing that he has romantic feelings for her, but she rejects him because she viewed it as a betrayal to Jade to kiss her ex-boyfriend. In the episode, "Tori Fixes Beck and Jade", Beck tries dating a girl named Meredith, who wants to do anything he wants, causing him to realize how he prefers dating a girl who "fights back" and "has a big mouth" because it is not easy and that an easy relationship to him is "boring". This causes him to see how much he misses being with Jade and that he loves her, bringing the two back together again. Following this, their relationship is stronger and more stable.

In the Sam & Cat episode "#TheKillerTunaJump", Jade says that the two are still in a relationship. He, or another student resembling him, can be seen together with Tori or a girl resembling her in the episode "#MommaGoomer", as Sam and Cat go to Hollywood Arts in order to ask Sikowitz for help.

=== Trina Vega ===
Trina Vega (portrayed by Daniella Monet) is a junior/senior and is Tori's vain older sister, who also attends Hollywood Arts. Trina's allergic reaction to a Chinese herb gargle in the Pilot episode forces Tori to fill in for her in the school's big showcase, which leads to Tori being offered admission to Hollywood Arts.

Trina believes that her natural acting and singing will get her into any doors in Hollywood and make her a global star, while being very oblivious to the fact that she has little talent. It's revealed that when Trina was an incoming freshman, Sikowitz was the one who voted her into Hollywood arts, while under the effects of an expired fruit, not realizing she was terrible.

Trina's personality shows that she's quite selfish, self centered and shallow most of the time and is portrayed as being extremely difficult to deal with, sometimes even being called a "monster". However, before she was admitted to Hollywood Arts, she was depicted at her audition as a shy, sweet, nerdy girl.

Trina is shown for her love of glamour, fashion, popularity, accessories and "Fazzini Boots", known as ten inch heels.

Despite Trina's shallow personality, she can be concerned about her sister when she wants to be, and it is shown that she does look out for Tori a lot. Later in the series, she showed some minor character growth, such as in "Locked Up!" when she tries to get Tori out of a Yerbanian prison when she was accused of "attacking" the unnamed Yerbanian Chancellor and showed genuine concern for her wellbeing. Other examples of this are evidenced in the episodes "Tori the Zombie", "Beggin' On Your Knees", and "Tori Gets Stuck".

Trina also seems to have bad luck, as she often gets hurt. Some examples include: Falling from the ceiling, a wall falling on her, getting hit in the face with flour, and getting hit with a box of shoes.

By the final episode "Victori-yes", Trina is shown walking around in expensive boots and clothes and boasts about her finally landing a TV role and calls the show she is on "Top Notch Acting". It's later learned by Jade and Tori that show Trina was on was a Spanish comedy. In her show, she is shown portraying a giant piece of cheese being tormented by children in mouse costumes.

Trina later returns in the spin-off series Hollywood Arts where she becomes a teacher.

== Recurring characters ==
=== Sinjin ===
Sinjin Van Cleef (portrayed by Michael Eric Reid) is a strange and questionable student at Hollywood Arts. He is nerdy, disturbing, and very weird, often considered stranger than even Robbie or Cat; his locker has his chewed up food on it and he also likes to collect the teeth of past presidents' relatives. He is usually used as a fake date or bribed to fake date someone, including Cat. He usually interrupts conversations with weird comments that do not make sense. He is a fan of disco music and has a huge crush on Tori and Jade, although both show more irritation than the interest in his presence. Sinjin is skilled in the background work on the school's productions and performances. He is shown to be proficient with audio, lighting, and making props, and is the apparent leader of the technical team. He is also skilled in computer science, to the point of being able to hack into a private server to delete an embarrassing picture of Jade in "The Bad Roommate". He appears in almost every episode of the series, except for "Stage Fighting", "Cat's New Boyfriend", "Sleepover at Sikowitz's", "Locked Up!", "Tori Tortures Teacher, "Jade Gets Crushed", "Terror on Cupcake Street", "The Breakfast Bunch", "Andre's Horrible Girl", "Car, Rain and Fire" and "Driving Tori Crazy". It is revealed in "A Christmas Tori" that he has a sister named Courtney (played by Dominique Grund) who also attends Hollywood Arts.

=== Sikowitz ===
Erwin Sikowitz (/ˈsaɪkoʊwɪts/ SEYE-koh-wits; portrayed by Eric Lange) is the hippie-like acting teacher at Hollywood Arts. His habits might be interpreted as weird and his methods are shown to be often very strange (including throwing a ball at Cat while she is performing), but at times very effective. He often walks around barefoot, which is the supposed trait of the hippies. He likes to enter the class through a window and is almost always seen drinking from coconut because, as Jade says, "the milk gives him visions". Tori gave him two dollars on her first day at Hollywood Arts, thinking he was homeless. He also gave Cat, Jade, Beck, Andre, and Robbie permission to start a fake ping-pong team to make money and have a fancy dinner. He claims to be 34 years old in "The Diddly-Bops".

"Pilot" is the only episode where he is referred to as Mr. Sikowitz. In all other episodes, he is just called Sikowitz. In "Sleepover at Sikowitz's", it is revealed that he has a nephew named Jason, who went out on a date with Cat, although the results are not mentioned. His catchphrase is "Good Gandhi!" As strange as Sikowitz is, he is the favorite teacher of Tori, Cat, Jade, Beck, Andre, and Robbie, and is very open and comfortable with them, to the point he says that he is their friend in a few episodes.

Sikowitz is regularly seen drinking from a coconut (he once drank fermented coconut milk and had visions during Trina's audition). In one episode when Tori goes to him asking for help, he is hanging upside down from the ceiling, and in another, he stored his grandmother in the corner before slinging her over his shoulder and taking her to the hospital. He has an extremely strange house as revealed in "Sleepover at Sikowitz's". At the Hollywood Arts Prom, he brought a pile of tires, matches and a bottle of fuel, thinking for unknown reasons that they were going to have a bonfire of tires.

Sikowitz appeared in the Sam & Cat episode "#MommaGoomer". He is seen teaching his students about backward acting when Sam and Cat come in. Sikowitz scolds Cat for showing up very late with the class being almost over. When the bell rings, Sam and Cat tell Sikowitz that they would like to use his classroom for a charity called "The Salvation Goomers" (which was a cover-up for Goomer claiming to his mother that he is a history teacher). During Goomer's teaching of history to Sam, Cat, Dice, Goomer's mom, and the local shruggers, Sikowitz comes in stating that he had gone to Charityosity.com where he found nothing about "The Salvation Goomers". After Goomer confessed to his mother that he is an MMA fighter, Sikowitz uses an electric shaver to get the fake pit hair off of Dice's armpits claiming that he grew them too soon. In the same series, Cat has a picture of a laughing Sikowitz near her bed in the room that she shares with Sam.

=== Lane ===
Lane Alexander (portrayed by Lane Napper) is the guidance counselor for Hollywood Arts. Lane is a good guidance counselor, and often helps students with their problems and resolves their arguments, but sometimes can be reluctant at times, asking students "Why Me?". He is usually the one making the big announcements at school. He appears to either hate dry skin or is obsessed with lotion (as seen in "The Wood"), as he can be seen frequently applying lotion to his hands. He has a nephew named Devon, as seen in "The Diddly-Bops". Lane is the one who made a reality television series, The Wood, leave the school because it was becoming an issue with the students and disrupting the learning environment.

He tends to be a bit extreme in his dealings such as when he issued a two-week detention to Tori for a supposed accidental hit on Jade during a stage fighting practice, made Robbie and Trina cover for Festus after accidentally injuring him, and having Tori and Jade take Festus home after unknowingly wrecking his car which was similar to one of the janitors' car.

As revealed on his profile on TheSlap.com, Lane's last name is Alexander.

=== David and Holly Vega ===
David and Holly Vega (portrayed by Jim Pirri and Jennifer Carta respectively) are the parents of Tori and Trina. David works as a police officer while Holly's job was never revealed.

They were shown to be loving at times, but mostly were neglectful as they were never home and went on lavish getaways without their daughters. When they were there, they often neglected Trina and Tori's needs, and were absent when it came to parental responsibilities. For example, in "Freak the Freak Out", Trina gets her wisdom teeth removed and their parents decide to go out of town to Santa Barbara, California so they would not have to take care of her, knowing she would get violent. Due to these factors, Trina and Tori were the ones who had to take care of themselves since their parents weren't doing so. Tori likes to point out at times that her father is a cop, usually to get Sinjin back off of her, but also to others, especially if someone is annoying her. David Vega works with the LAPD.

It was hinted in "Crazy Ponnie" that Holly Vega was having an affair with her husband's colleague, Gary.

=== Andre's grandmother ===
Charlotte Harris (portrayed by Marilyn Harris) is Andre's grandmother. She is mentally unstable and often paranoid about things. She is shown to be afraid of nearly everything, including various sensible objects such as clocks and mirrors. In the episode "Wi-Fi in the Sky" she gets scared after seeing her reflection in a mirror and screams "Andre, there's another 'me' on the wall!". When she is greeted by new people, she hides behind anything she can find, while simultaneously shouting out "I don't know you!" Andre tells Tori in the "Pilot" episode that her coming to see Trina perform "Make It Shine" is the first time in six years that she has left her house. He also mentions in "Survival of the Hottest" that before she lost her mind, she used to tell him, "Andre, no matter how bad things get, you can always make it better by singing a song". She often snaps at Andre and is possibly the only way she communicates with anyone. In "Wi-Fi in the Sky", she yells at Andre for "talking to himself" when he was in reality video chatting with Tori, Cat, and Beck then freaks out and punches Andre's computer. During an interview on a video on TheSlap.com in which Andre read off her crazy text messages, her first name is revealed to be Charlotte. She has appeared in "Pilot", "Wi-Fi in the Sky", "Sleepover At Sikowitz's", "iParty With Victorious", "Driving Tori Crazy", "Tori Fixes Beck and Jade" and "The Bad Roommate".

=== Mrs. Lee ===
Mrs. Lee (portrayed by Susan Chuang) is the owner of Tori's favorite Chinese restaurant Wok Star, who volunteers to pay to produce Jade's play in the episode "Wok Star". But things get complicated when Mrs. Lee makes drastic changes to the script and wants to put her daughter, Daisy, in the play.

Mrs. Lee returns in the episode "Andre's Horrible Girl", now operating a Sushi bar called Nozu after Wok Star "mysteriously" burned down in an accidental fire. This prompts Tori to ask if she is Chinese or Japanese, which she answers with a smack to Tori's head. She later appears in the third-season episode "How Trina Got In", making Tori and Robbie chop a pile of squid after they cannot pay their bill. After the bill was worked off, Robbie accidentally breaks some dishes, causing Mrs. Lee to have Robbie work off the damages with one of the jobs being rubbing her chef Kwakoo's feet. She also appears in the fourth-season episode "The Hambone King" where she praises Robbie's hamboning skills. She has a grudge against both Jade and Tori because they left her daughter hanging from the ceiling.

=== Burf ===
Burf (portrayed by Darsan Solomon) is a student who goes to Hollywood Arts and often hangs out with Sinjin. He is first seen in the episode "Tori & Jade's Playdate", spying on Tori and Jade for Sikowitz so they cannot escape Nozu. He then appears in "Driving Tori Crazy" when Cat offers him a bag of rags. He also appears in "The Blonde Squad", and in "Tori Goes Platinum", when he sends in a video of himself singing for a contest. He also appears in the season 4 episodes "Wanko's Warehouse" and "Three Girls and a Moose".
