= The Drowning (film) =

2016 American-Hong Kong film by Bette Gordon

- Directed by: Bette Gordon
- Screenplay by: Stephen Molton; Frank Pugliese
- Based on: Border Crossing by Pat Barker
- Produced by: Daniel L. Blanc; Radium Cheung; Jamin O'Brien
- Starring: Josh Charles; Julia Stiles; Avan Jogia
- Cinematography: Radium Cheung
- Edited by: John David Allen
- Music by: Anton Sanko
- Production company: The Film Community
- Distributed by: Paladin
- Release date: 8 October 2016 (Warsaw)
- Running time: 95 minutes
- Countries: United States; Hong Kong
- Language: English

The Drowning is a 2016 thriller drama film directed by Bette Gordon and starring Josh Charles, Julia Stiles and Avan Jogia. An American-Hong Kong co-production, the film is based on Pat Barker's 2001 novel Border Crossing.

== Plot ==
The Drowning tells the story of a forensic psychologist haunted by his expert witness testimony that sent a young boy to prison for a chilling murder. When the boy later reappears in his life, he is drawn into a destructive, soul-searching reinvestigation of the case.

== Cast ==
- Josh Charles as Tom Seymour
- Julia Stiles as Lauren Seymour
- Avan Jogia as Danny Miller
- Tracie Thoms as Angela
- John C. McGinley as Teddy
- Leo Fitzpatrick as Angus MacDonald
- Robert Clohessy as Captain Miller
- Jasper Newell as Young Danny
- Sam Lilja as Jeremy

== Reception ==
On the review aggregator website Rotten Tomatoes, 46% of 13 critics' reviews are positive, with an average rating of 4.5/10. Metacritic, which uses a weighted average, assigned the film a score of 43 out of 100, based on 8 critics, indicating "mixed or average" reviews. Simon Abrams of RogerEbert.com gave the film one star. Diego Semerene of Slant Magazine awarded the film half a star out of four.
