= Charles Allen Thomas =

American chemist (1900–1982)

- Born: February 15, 1900; Scott County, Kentucky, U.S.
- Died: March 29, 1982 (aged 82); Albany, Georgia, U.S.
- Education: Transylvania University (BA); Massachusetts Institute of Technology (MS)
- Spouse(s): Margaret Stoddard Talbott (1926–1975); Margaret Chandler Porter (1980–1982)
- Awards: Medal for Merit (1946); IRI Medal (1947); Perkin Medal (1953); Priestley Medal (1955)
- Scientific career
- Fields: Chemistry
- Workplaces: Washington University in St. Louis; General Motors; Monsanto; Dayton Project

Charles Allen Thomas (February 15, 1900 – March 29, 1982) was a noted American chemist and businessman, and an important figure in the Manhattan Project. He held over 100 patents.

A graduate of Transylvania College and Massachusetts Institute of Technology, Thomas worked as a research chemist at General Motors as part of a team researching antiknock agents. This led to the development of tetraethyllead, which was widely used in motor fuels for many decades until its toxicity led to its prohibition. In 1926, he and Carroll A. "Ted" Hochwalt co-founded Thomas & Hochwalt Laboratories in Dayton, Ohio, with Thomas as president of the company. It was acquired by Monsanto in 1936, and Thomas would spend the rest of his career with Monsanto, rising to become its president in 1950, and chairman of the board from 1960 to 1965. He researched the chemistry of hydrocarbons and polymers, and developed the proton theory of aluminium chloride, which helped explain a variety of chemical reactions, publishing a book on the subject in 1941.

From 1943 to 1945, he coordinated Manhattan Project work on plutonium purification and production. He also coordinated the development of techniques to industrially refine polonium for use with beryllium in the triggers of atomic weapons in the Manhattan Project's Dayton Project, part of which was conducted on the estate of his wife's family. Shortly before the war ended, he took over the management of the Clinton Laboratories in Oak Ridge, Tennessee. Monsanto pulled out of Oak Ridge in December 1947, but became the operator of the Mound Laboratories in 1948. Secretary of State Dean Acheson appointed Thomas to serve on a 1946 panel to appraise international atomic inspection, which culminated in the Acheson–Lilienthal Report. In 1953 he was appointed as a consultant to the National Security Council, and served as U.S. representative to the United Nations Atomic Energy Commission.

== Early life and education ==
Charles Allen Thomas was born on a farm in Scott County, Kentucky, the son of a Disciples of Christ minister, Charles Allen, and his wife Frances Carrick Thomas. His father died when he was six months old, and he and his mother went to live with his grandmother in Lexington, Kentucky, just across the street from Transylvania College. While living on the farm he was home schooled by his mother and grandmother. After moving to Lexington he attended Hamilton College's preparatory school, and then Morton High School. When he was 16, he entered Transylvania College, which awarded him his Bachelor of Arts (AB) degree in 1920. During World War I, he served in the Student Army Training Corps, and for a time was a rifle instructor at Camp Perry. He then entered the Massachusetts Institute of Technology (MIT), from which he received a Master of Science (MS) degree, majoring in chemistry, in 1924. To help pay for his tuition, he worked as a professional singer, and for a time he considered a career as a vocalist. His singing voice was described by his son as a high baritone.

In 1923 Charles F. Kettering and Carroll A. "Ted" Hochwalt recruited Thomas to work as a research chemist at General Motors (GM). There, he worked with Thomas Midgley Jr., as part of Kettering's team researching antiknock agents. This led to the development of tetraethyllead, which was used in motor fuels for many years before being banned in most parts of the world as a poison. At General Motors, Thomas also worked on a process for extracting bromine from sea water, and with Midgely on making synthetic rubber from isoprene. Thomas left General Motors in 1924 for a job as a research chemist, a joint venture between GM and Esso to make and sell tetraethyllead gasoline additives.

Thomas married Margaret Stoddard Talbott, the sister of Harold E. Talbott Jr. on September 25, 1926. They had four children: Charles Allen Thomas III, Margaret Talbott, Frances Carrick, and Katharine Tudor. That year, he and Hochwalt co-founded Thomas & Hochwalt Laboratories in Dayton, Ohio, with Thomas as president of the company. The company carried out research for various companies, looking into such diverse subjects as a fire extinguisher that would not freeze in unheated buildings, and a means to speed up the aging of whiskey. Their work attracted the attention of Edgar Monsanto Queeny, the chairman of Monsanto, who bought Thomas & Hochwalt Laboratories for $1.4 million in Monsanto stock in 1936. Queeny moved Thomas to St Louis, Missouri, where he became director of Central Research, while Hochwalt remained in Dayton to work on Acrilan, Monsanto's acrylic fiber.

Thomas would spend the rest of his career with Monsanto, becoming a member of its board of directors in 1942, vice president in 1943, executive vice president in 1947, president in 1950, and ultimately chairman of the board from 1960 to 1965. He subsequently served as chairman of Monsanto's Finance Committee from 1965 to 1968. He retired in 1970. In this time, Monsanto's annual sales grew from $34 million to $1.9 billion, and its expenditure on research from $6.2 million to 101.4 million. He researched the chemistry of hydrocarbons and polymers. In studying the chemical reactions between alkenes and dienes, particularly in the presence of an aluminium chloride catalyst, he developed the proton theory of aluminium chloride, which helped explain a variety of chemical reactions, including cracking, polymerization and dehydrogenation. This research culminated in the publication of his book Anhydrous Aluminum Chloride in Organic Chemistry in 1941.

== Manhattan Project ==
In December 1942, during World War II, Thomas joined the National Defense Research Committee (NDRC) as the Deputy Chief of its Division 8, which was responsible for propellants, explosives and the like. Early in 1943, he traveled to the East with Richard Tolman, a member of the NDRC, and James B. Conant, the president of Harvard University and the chairman of the NDRC, to witness a demonstration of a new underwater explosive. Conant and Tolman took the opportunity to quietly investigate Thomas's background. Thomas was then invited to a meeting in Washington DC with Brigadier General Leslie R. Groves, Jr., the director of the Manhattan Project, and, as he discovered when he got there, Conant.

Groves and Conant were hoping to harness his industrial expertise for the benefit of the project. They offered him a post as a deputy to Robert Oppenheimer, at the Los Alamos Laboratory in New Mexico, but he did not wish to move his family or give up his responsibilities at Monsanto. Instead he accepted the role of coordinating the plutonium purification and production work being carried out at Los Alamos, the Metallurgical Laboratory in Chicago, Radiation laboratory in Berkeley, and Ames Laboratory in Iowa. Monsanto's Central Research Department began to conduct research on behalf of the Manhattan Project as part of the Manhattan Project's Dayton Project, some of which was conducted on the estate of his wife's family.

Initially, there were concerns about the purity of plutonium, an element about which little was known, but Thomas was able to report to Groves and Conant in June 1944 that techniques had been developed that would yield highly pure plutonium, and that the problem was solved. Unfortunately, experiments by Emilio G. Segrè and his P-5 Group at Los Alamos on reactor-produced plutonium showed that it contained impurities in the form of the isotope plutonium-240, which has a far higher spontaneous fission rate than plutonium-239, making it unsuitable for use in the Thin Man gun-type nuclear weapon design.

Thomas attended a series of crisis meetings in Chicago with Connant, Groves, Arthur Compton, Kenneth Nichols and Enrico Fermi. It was agreed that the isotopes could not be separated, so high-purity plutonium would not be required. Thomas therefore decided to disband his plutonium purification team. The Los Alamos laboratory then turned to the technologically much more difficult task of building an implosion-type nuclear weapon.

Monsanto was already working on a key component of the device. In April 1943, Robert Serber had proposed that instead of relying on spontaneous fission, the chain reaction inside the bomb should be triggered by a neutron initiator. The best-known neutron sources were radium-beryllium and polonium-beryllium. The later was chosen as it had a 140-day half life, which made it intense enough to be useful but long-lived enough to be stockpiled. Thomas brought in Monsanto to work on the development of techniques to industrially refine polonium for use with beryllium in the urchin detonators.

Thomas established the project in the Runnymede Playhouse on the grounds of his wife's family estate in a wealthy residential section of Oakwood, a suburb of Dayton. He promised the Oakwood City Council that he would return the Runnymede Playhouse building intact after the war, but he was unable to keep this promise because the building became so badly contaminated with radioactivity. The facility, also known as Dayton Unit IV, was in use for nuclear work until 1949 when Mound Laboratories opened in Miamisburg, Ohio. The Playhouse was dismantled in 1950, and buried in Oak Ridge, Tennessee.

Thomas was one of a number of scientists who watched their work come to fruition on July 16, 1945, at the Trinity nuclear test. For his work on the project, he received the Medal for Merit from the president Harry S. Truman in 1946. On May 2, 1945, Groves and Thomas agreed that Monsanto would take over the running of the Clinton laboratories at Oak Ridge, Tennessee from July 1, 1945. Thomas brought in some 60 new staff from Dayton to help run the Clinton Laboratories, and he persuaded Eugene Wigner to come from Chicago to work on new reactor designs. Under Wigner, the Laboratories made a pioneering study of Wigner's disease, the swelling and distortion of the graphite used as a moderator in reactors due to the neutron bombardment produced in a reactor. Thomas became frustrated with restrictions on spending and the uncertainty about the future of the laboratory. In May 1947, he decided not to renew the contract with the Atomic Energy Commission to operate the Clinton Laboratories on a month-to-month basis while a new operator was found. Union Carbide took over the contract in December 1947. Monsanto was, however, given the contract to operate the new Mound Laboratories in early 1948.

== Later life ==
In 1946 Secretary of State Dean Acheson appointed Thomas to serve on a panel with Robert Oppenheimer, David Lilienthal, Chester I. Barnard and Harry Winne to appraise international atomic inspection, culminating in the Acheson–Lilienthal Report. In 1951 Truman appointed Thomas to the Science Advisory Committee, an eleven-man committee of prominent scientists to advise on defense planning. In 1953 President Dwight D. Eisenhower appointed him a scientific consultant to the National Security Council, and he was the U.S. representative to the United Nations Atomic Energy Commission. In the wake of the Sputnik crisis, Thomas was part of a group that persuaded Secretary of Defense Neil H. McElroy to establish DARPA.

Thomas served as a trustee of the Carnegie Corporation of New York and the Universities Research Association, a curator of Transylvania College, chairman of the board of trustees of Washington University in St. Louis, a member of the Corporation that runs MIT, and the chairman of the board of directors of the Washington University Medical Center. He was also member of the board of directors of several companies, including Chemstrand Corporation, Southwestern Bell, St. Louis Union Trust, the First National Bank in St. Louis, the Central Institute for the Deaf, Metropolitan Life Insurance, RAND Corporation and the Civic Center Redevelopment Corporation of St. Louis. He was involved with organizations including the Boy Scouts of America, Radio Free Europe and the St Louis Research Council.

Thomas was elected to the National Academy of Sciences at age forty-eight and was one of the founding members of the National Academy of Engineering. He was also a Fellow of the American Academy of Arts and Sciences and a Member of the American Philosophical Society. In addition, he received over 100 patents, the Industrial Research Institute Medal in 1947, the American Institute of Chemists Gold Medal in 1948, the Missouri Award for Distinguished Service in Engineering in 1952, the Society of Chemical Industry's Perkin Medal in 1953, the American Chemical Society Priestley Medal in 1955, the Société de Chimie Industrielle (American Section) International Palladium Medal in 1963, the American Academy of Achievement's Golden Plate Award in 1965, and the St. Louis Globe-Democrat Man of the Year award in 1966.

Thomas was concerned that the United States did not spend enough money on basic research. To this end he donated $600,000 to Washington University in St. Louis as an endowment for a chair, the Charles Allen Thomas Professor of Chemistry. He rejected the notion large corporations as being driven solely or mainly by greed. In a 1952 speech he enjoined his fellow businessmen to "remember that our businesses and their profits are only a means to an end, a means toward making Americans happier and America a stronger and more unified nation."

In retirement, Thomas spent much of his time managing Magnolia Plantation, a 15,000-acre (6,100 ha) family farm near Albany, Georgia, where he employed a staff of 50 and grew peanuts, pecans, soybeans, corn and timber. His first wife died in 1975, and he married Margaret Chandler Porter in 1980. He died at his farm on March 29, 1982. He was survived by his second wife and four children. His papers are collected at Washington University in St. Louis.
