= Harold E. Talbott =

US Secretary of the Air Force (1888–1957)

Harold Talbott
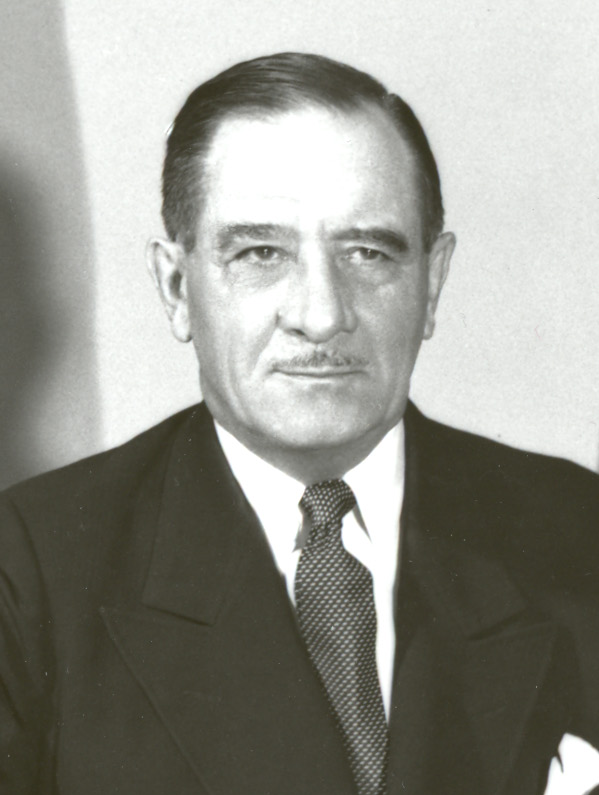

United States Secretary of the Air Force
- In office February 4, 1953 – August 13, 1955
- President: Dwight D. Eisenhower
- Preceded by: Thomas K. Finletter
- Succeeded by: Donald A. Quarles

Personal details
- Born: Harold Elstner Talbott Jr. March 31, 1888 Dayton, Ohio, U.S.
- Died: March 2, 1957 (aged 68) Palm Beach, Florida, U.S.
- Party: Republican
- Education: Yale University (attended)

Military service
- Branch/service: United States Army
- Rank: Major

Harold Elstner Talbott Jr. (March 31, 1888 – March 2, 1957) was the third United States Secretary of the Air Force.

== Biography ==
He was born in Dayton, Ohio, in March 1888 and died in 1957. He attended The Hill School in Pottstown, Pennsylvania, and spent two years at Yale University before returning to his father's construction company in 1911. He was a well-known polo player.

=== Family ===
Talbott's father was a wealthy engineer who was involved in the construction of the Soo Locks on Lake Superior and had various railroad and paper milling interests. Talbott Sr. was the first mayor of Oakwood, Ohio. He was also involved in the recovery of Dayton from the 1913 flood. He served as the director of the City National Bank of Dayton.

His mother was active in the Dayton anti-suffrage league, which opposed giving women the right to vote. She was also involved in the Anti-Saloon League and was a patroness of the Dayton Westminster Choir.

His brother Nelson "Bud" Talbott was the coach for the Dayton Triangles professional football team, a predecessor to today's Indianapolis Colts.

His great-nephew Strobe Talbott was a deputy secretary of state in the Clinton administration.

In 1925, Talbott married Margaret Thayer (1898–1962), who was the daughter of Marian Longstreth Morris Thayer, a survivor of the RMS Titanic disaster, and John B. Thayer, a railroad executive who perished aboard the ship. Harold's and Margaret's children included Margaret Noyes, Pauline Toland, John Thayer Talbott, and H. E. Talbott III. In July 1962 his widow (Margaret Thayer) committed suicide by jumping from the 12th story of their Fifth Avenue apartment in New York City.

During World War II, the Runnymede Playhouse on the Talbott family estate in a residential neighborhood of Oakwood, Montgomery County, Ohio (a suburb of Dayton), hosted the Dayton Project (the part of the Manhattan Project involved in creating the neutron-generating triggers for the first atomic bombs from radioactive polonium). Charles Allen Thomas, a Delco-GM and Monsanto Company chemist who was in charge of the project, was married to Harold's sister Margaret.

=== Career ===
From 1906 to about 1913 Harold Talbott served as president of Platt Iron Works in Dayton along with his polo teammate Edwin F. Platt.

Talbott's interest in aviation dated from the early days of the Wright brothers. He was a pupil of Katharine Wright and a customer of the Wright's bicycle shop. In 1915 Talbott helped build one of the first wind tunnels for aviation experiments in Dayton. In the spring of 1916, his father, Edward A. Deeds, and Charles Kettering formed the Dayton-Wright Airplane Company, which reused the factory buildings of the 1909–1916 Wright Company but was a completely different business. The young Talbott became the company's president, while Orville Wright received a courtesy position as a consulting engineer. Talbott was a passenger on Orville's last flight in 1918.

At the beginning of World War I, Deeds joined the US Army with the rank of colonel and became Chief of Aircraft Production. At McCook Field, a precursor to Wright-Patterson Air Force Base, Deeds supervised aircraft procurement. The Dayton-Wright Company took over the newly built Delco-Light plant. The expanded plant constructed the two-seat fighter, the DeHaviland–4, later modified to the DeHaviland–9, and turned out about 400 training planes. In 1918 the plant, which employed 12,000 people, produced 38 planes per day and manufactured more wartime aircraft overall than any other U.S. plant.

During September 1918, Talbott was commissioned a major in the Air Service of the Signal Corps. His assignment as one of a group of officers in charge of aircraft maintenance and repair in France was canceled by the armistice. In October 1918 Supreme Court Justice Charles Evans Hughes and Attorney General Thomas Watt Gregory reported to President Wilson on the results of an investigation into wartime aircraft production. Hughes criticized the close relationship between Colonel Deeds and Dayton-Wright. Hughes specifically mentioned improper communications between Deeds and Harold Talbott about matters affecting aircraft procurement. Hughes recommended that Colonel Deeds be court-martialed, but the Army did not pursue the case.

In 1919 General Motors acquired DELCO-Light, Dayton-Wright, and the Dayton Metal Products Company. All were businesses associated with Talbott, Deeds, and Kettering.

In 1922 GM established the Inland Manufacturing Division to build wooden steering wheels at the former Dayton-Wright plant. Talbott served as president of Inland.

In 1925 Talbott moved to New York and became a director of Chrysler Corporation. In the 1930s he served as president of the Cloud Club located on the 66th, 67th, and 68th floors of the Chrysler Building in New York City.

General Motors Corporation took a controlling interest in North American Aviation and merged it with its General Aviation division in 1933. In 1932 Talbott became chairman of the executive committee of NAA. In the 1930s he was also a director of TWA. At the time North American held shares in Douglas Aircraft Company which was building military aircraft. Talbott prevailed on Donald Douglas to enter the commercial market by building the DC-1 and DC-2 aircraft to TWA's specification.

Talbott was an active Republican presidential campaign fund-raiser in 1940, 1948 and 1952. He was chairman of the Republican national finance committee in 1948 and 1949. He also had been a member of the War Production Board during 1942 and 1943.

He became the third Secretary of the Air Force on February 4, 1953, during a period when the Korean War had jolted Congress into authorizing additional wings and their supporting infrastructure. Consequently, he was able to focus his efforts on the needs of airmen and their families. He succeeded in obtaining more military housing than had his predecessors. Combining better housing with pay increases and other needed improvements, he raised the service personnel retention rate by linking enhanced military benefits to reenlistment.

In September 1953, Talbott famously confronted Howard Hughes about his management of the AIM-4 Falcon project and the loss of top members of management, within the Hughes Aircraft Co. As a result, ICBM development for the Air Force transitioned to the Ramo-Wooldridge Corp (later TRW Inc.).

During his tenure, Talbott appointed a commission to assist him in selecting the permanent site for the Air Force Academy. After considering 580 proposed sites in 45 states, the commission recommended three locations. From those, he selected the site near Colorado Springs.

In 1955, the Chattanooga Times uncovered that Talbott was using Air Force stationery to solicit business for an engineering firm of which he owned fifty percent, from contractors who sold to the Air Force. After a Congressional investigation, Talbott resigned his position as Secretary in August 1955.

Talbott died of a cerebral hemorrhage in Palm Beach, Florida, on March 2, 1957.

Political offices
Preceded by Thomas K. Finletter	United States Secretary of the Air Force; 1953–1955	Succeeded by Donald A. Quarles
