= List of The Citadel Bulldogs in the NFL draft =

This is a list of The Citadel Bulldogs football players who have been picked in the National Football League draft and American Football League draft.

Each NFL franchise seeks to add new players through the annual NFL draft. The draft rules were last updated in 2009. The team with the worst record the previous year picks first, the next-worst team second, and so on. Teams that did not make the playoffs are ordered by their regular-season record with any remaining ties broken by strength of schedule. Playoff participants are sequenced after non-playoff teams, based on their round of elimination (wild card, division, conference, and Super Bowl).

Before the merger agreements in 1966, the American Football League (AFL) operated in direct competition with the NFL and held a separate draft. This led to a massive bidding war over top prospects between the two leagues. As part of the merger agreement on June 8, 1966, the two leagues would hold a multiple round "common draft". When the AFL officially merged with the NFL in 1970, the "common draft" simply became the NFL draft.

== Key ==
B	Back	K	Kicker	NT	Nose tackle
C	Center	LB	Linebacker	FB	Fullback
DB	Defensive back	P	Punter	HB	Halfback
DE	Defensive end	QB	Quarterback	WR	Wide receiver
DT	Defensive tackle	RB	Running back	G	Guard
E	End	T	Offensive tackle	TE	Tight end

== Selections ==
Year	Round	Pick	Overall	Player	Team	Position
1939	13	1	111	Andy Sabados	Chicago Cardinals	G
1959	14	9	165	Pete Davidson	Los Angeles Rams	T
1960	N/A	N/A	N/A	Wayne Stewart	Los Angeles Chargers	G
1960	N/A	N/A	N/A	Joe Davis	Los Angeles Chargers	T
1960	N/A	N/A	N/A	Paul Maguire	Los Angeles Chargers	E
1960	N/A	N/A	N/A	Pete Davidson	Los Angeles Chargers	T
1960	N/A	N/A	N/A	Harry Rakowski	Buffalo Bills	C
1960	15	1	169	Harry Rakowski	Los Angeles Rams	C
1960	17	2	194	Joe Davis	Chicago Cardinals	T
1964	8	7	63	Vince Petno	Oakland Raiders	DB
1969	16	25	415	Jim McMillan	Baltimore Colts	RB
1970	1	12	12	John Small	Atlanta Falcons	LB
1977	11	25	304	Brian Ruff	Baltimore Colts	LB
1981	9	5	226	Stump Mitchell	St. Louis Cardinals	RB
1987	9	23	246	Greg Davis	Tampa Bay Buccaneers	K
1995	5	36	170	Travis Jervey	Green Bay Packers	RB
2005	7	8	222	Nehemiah Broughton	Washington Redskins	RB
2010	3	24	88	Andre Roberts	Arizona Cardinals	WR
2011	4	31	128	Cortez Allen	Pittsburgh Steelers	DB
