= Pete Davidson (American football) =

American football player (1937–1995)

No. 71
- Position: Defensive tackle

Personal information
- Born: July 25, 1937; Dayton, Ohio, U.S.
- Died: March 25, 1995 (aged 57); Greenwood, Indiana, U. S.
- Listed height: 6 ft 5 in (1.96 m)
- Listed weight: 255 lb (116 kg)

Career information
- High school: Oakwood (Oakwood, Ohio)
- College: The Citadel (1956–1959)
- NFL draft: 1959: 14th round, 165th overall pick
- AFL draft: 1960: 1st round

Career history
- Los Angeles Rams (1960)*; St. Louis Cardinals (1960); Houston Oilers (1960)
- * Offseason or practice squad member only

Awards and highlights
- AFL champion (1960)

Career NFL statistics
- Games played: 1
- Stats at Pro Football Reference

Peter Stewart Davidson Sr. (July 25, 1937 – March 25, 1995) was an American professional football defensive Tackle who played in the American Football League (AFL) with the Houston Oilers. He played college football for The Citadel Bulldogs. Davidson also had stints in the National Football League (NFL) with the Los Angeles Rams and St. Louis Cardinals.

== Early life ==
Davidson was born on July 25, 1937, in Dayton, Ohio. He attended Oakwood High School in Oakwood, Ohio.

== College career ==
Davidson played college football for The Citadel Bulldogs from 1956 to 1959 and was a four-year letterman. He played on the offensive and defensive line for the Bulldogs. Davidson had one reception for five yards in 1957.

== Professional career ==
=== Los Angeles Rams ===
Davidson was selected in the 14th round, with the 165th overall selection, by the Los Angeles Rams in the 1959 NFL draft. He was also drafted by the Los Angeles Chargers of the American Football League (AFL) with their first selection in the 1960 AFL draft.

=== St. Louis Cardinals ===
On August 3, 1960, Davidson was traded to the St. Louis Cardinals for an undisclosed future draft pick. On August 17, 1960, he was placed on waivers.

=== Houston Oilers ===
On September 14, 1960, the Houston Oilers of the AFL signed Davidson. He played in one game for the Oilers before he was released.

== Play-playing career ==
Davidson was a teacher and coach at West Carrollton, Ohio from 1961 to 1965, general manager of the Stouffer Hotel in Indianapolis and administrative assistant to the superintendent of Greenwood Community Schools Corporation.
