= Oakwood High School (Ohio) =

Public, coeducational high school in Dayton, Ohio, US

Location
- 1200 Far Hills Ave. Dayton, (Montgomery County), Ohio 45419; United States; 39°43′15″N 84°10′18″W

Information
- Type: Public, Coeducational high school
- School district: Oakwood City School District
- Superintendent: Dr. Neil Gupta
- Principal: Matt Salyer
- Teaching staff: 35.14 (FTE)
- Grades: 9-12
- Student to teacher ratio: 19.01
- Campus: Suburban
- Colors: Blue and Gold
- Fight song: Stand Up and Cheer
- Athletics conference: Southwestern Buckeye League
- Mascot: Lumberjack/Lumberjill
- Nickname: Jacks/Jills
- Accreditation: North Central Association of Colleges and Schools
- Newspaper: The Ax
- Yearbook: The Acorn
- Athletic Director: Tyler Rhodus
- Website: ohs.oakwoodschools.org

Oakwood High School (OHS) is a public secondary school in Oakwood, Montgomery County, Ohio. As of the 2023–2024 school year, there are around 700 students. The school mascot is the Lumberjack.

Oakwood was named A National Blue Ribbon School by the U.S. Department of Education in 1990–91 and 2007. In the 2021–22 school year, Oakwood was ranked second in the state on the Ohio Department of Education's High School Performance Index.

== Clubs and activities ==
=== Speech and Debate ===
The school's speech and debate program has existed for nearly a century. It has competed in the National Forensics League National Championship Tournament over sixty times. The team offers competition in seven oratory and interp events, and Public forum, Lincoln Douglas, and Congressional debate. They won the Statewide competition in the 2024-2025 season.

=== Academic Decathlon ===
The Oakwood Academic Decathlon team is part of the Academic Decathlon of Ohio and has won the state championship each year between 2011 and 2023. The team has also won the Division III National Championship in 2012–17, 2019, 2021–23 and won the Division II National Championship in 2018. The Oakwood Academic Decathlon set the highest score record for any Division III school in 2016. Oakwood is notable for having the only four competitors in Ohio to break 9000 points at a competition.

== Athletics ==
Oakwood High School plays in the Southwestern Buckeye League.

Oakwood High School's boys' golf team won the SWBL each year between 1992 and 2019.

Oakwood's girls' cross country team has had success with various individual runners. The girls' track and field team also won the Division II State Meet, with Hartman and Butler winning individual titles as well.

Varsity sports offered include basketball, baseball, cheerleading, cross country, field hockey, football, golf, lacrosse, soccer, softball, swimming & diving, tennis, track & field, volleyball, and wrestling.

== Ohio High School Athletic Association State Championships ==
- Boys Baseball – 1997
- Boys Golf – 1985, 2009, 2010, 2012, 2013
- Boys Track and field – 1929, 1930, 1931
- Girls Tennis – 2005
- Boys Swimming – 2013, 2014
- Girls track & field - 2021, 2022, 2026
- Girls Cross Country - 2025, 2026

== Notable alumni ==
- Jesse Cox, YouTube gaming personality, comedian, voice actor, and commentator
- Michael Hoecht, professional football player, Buffalo Bills
- Barry MacKay, tennis champion, tournament director, and tennis broadcaster
- James Reston, journalist and syndicated columnist with The New York Times and two-time Pulitzer Prize winner
- John Sauer, former professional football player, Los Angeles Rams
- Douglas Shulman, former Commissioner of Internal Revenue
- Beth Stelling, comedian and writer
- Annie Wang, entrepreneur and co-founder of Her Campus
- Charles W. Whalen Jr., former U.S. Congressman
