= Coathanger =

Coathanger or coat hanger may refer to:

- Clothes hanger
- Coathanger (Australian rules football), a dangerous high tackle in Australian Rules Football

Coathanger may also refer to:

- Auckland Harbour Bridge, colloquially called this because of its shape
- Brocchi's Cluster (astronomy), a random grouping of stars located in the constellation Vulpecula near the border with Sagitta
- Sydney Harbour Bridge, colloquially called this because of its shape
- Coathanger Antennae, an album by Diesel released in 2006
- Windsor Hanger, an Internet entrepreneur
- The Coathangers, American rock band
- "The Coathanger", a song by Squarepusher from his 2008 album Just a Souvenir
