= Michael Hoecht =

Canadian American football player (born 1997)

No. 55 – Buffalo Bills
- Position: Outside linebacker
- Roster status: Active

Personal information
- Born: October 5, 1997 (age 29); Oakville, Ontario, Canada
- Listed height: 6 ft 4 in (1.93 m)
- Listed weight: 264 lb (120 kg)

Career information
- High school: Oakwood (Oakwood, Ohio, U.S.)
- College: Brown (2016–2019)
- NFL draft: 2020: undrafted
- CFL draft: 2020: 2nd round, 10th overall pick

Career history
- Los Angeles Rams (2020–2024); Buffalo Bills (2025–present)

Awards and highlights
- Super Bowl champion (LVI); Second-team All-Ivy League (2019)

Career NFL statistics as of Week 11, 2026
- Total tackles: 203
- Sacks: 17.0
- Forced fumbles: 3
- Pass deflections: 6
- Stats at Pro Football Reference

Michael Hoecht (/hɔɪt/ HOYT; born October 5, 1997) is a Canadian professional football outside linebacker for the Buffalo Bills of the National Football League (NFL). He played college football for the Brown Bears.

== Early life ==
Hoecht was born in Oakville, Ontario, and lived in Canada until his family moved to Oakwood, Ohio (a community within Dayton, Ohio) when he was three years old. His family moved back to Canada for his first two years of high school, where he lived in Stittsville and went to South Carleton High School, then Toronto where he went to (North Toronto Collegiate Institute), before returning to Oakwood, Ohio, where he attended Oakwood High School for his final two years of high school.

== College career ==
Hoecht played for the Brown Bears for four seasons. He was named second-team All-Ivy League as a senior after finishing the season with 42 tackles, nine tackles for a loss, and four sacks. Hoecht finished his collegiate career with 174 tackles, 29.5 tackles for loss, and 16.5 sacks with two forced fumbles and four fumble recoveries in 37 games played.

=== Statistics ===
Season	GP	Defense				
Season	GP	Tckl	TfL	Sck	Int	FF
2016	7	18	4.0	4.0	0	0
2017	10	45	10.0	5.0	0	1
2018	10	69	6.5	3.5	0	1
2019	10	42	9.0	4.0	0	0
Total	37	174	29.5	16.5	0	2

== Professional career ==
Pre-draft measurables
Height	Weight
6 ft 3 1/4 in (1.91 m)	310 lb (141 kg)
Values from Pro Day

=== Los Angeles Rams ===
Hoecht was signed by the Los Angeles Rams as an undrafted free agent following the 2020 NFL draft on April 26, 2020. He was also selected by the Ottawa Redblacks in the second round of the 2020 CFL draft. Hoecht was waived by the Rams on September 4, 2020, during final roster cuts, and was subsequently signed to the team's practice squad one day later where he spent his first season.

In his second year, Hoecht signed a reserve/futures contract with the team on January 18, 2021. Hoecht made the Rams' 53-man roster out of training camp to start the 2021 season. Hoecht played in all 17 regular season games that year with three starts and had seven tackles. In that year, he also played in all four of the Rams' postseason games, including the team's 23–20 win over the Cincinnati Bengals in Super Bowl LVI.

For the entire 2022 season, Hoecht was on the Rams’ active roster. Midway through the season the Rams moved Hoecht’s position from defensive tackle to outside linebacker. As a starter in the final seven games, Hoecht produced 34 tackles, 4 tackles for loss, and 8 quarterback hits.

On March 15, 2023, the Rams tendered Hoecht as an exclusive rights free agent for the 2023 season which he signed a week later. Hoecht went on to start every game of the 2023 season opposite rookie Byron Young, logging 6 sacks, 81 tackles, a forced fumble, 7 tackles for loss and 11 quarterback hits. He helped the Rams clinch a playoff berth and produced half a sack and 2 quarterback hits in their 23-24 loss to the Detroit Lions in the Wildcard Round.

=== Buffalo Bills ===
On March 14, 2025, Hoecht signed a three-year, $21 million contract with the Buffalo Bills. However, after signing with the Bills, Hoecht was suspended for the first six games of the 2025 season for violating the NFL's PED policy. Hoecht returned from suspension during the Week 7 bye week, and played his first regular season game as a Bill in Week 8, a road game against the Carolina Panthers at Bank of America Stadium. He would play again in Week 9 at home against the Kansas City Chiefs. Early in the fourth quarter of the contest, Hoecht suffered a torn Achilles tendon, but notably stayed on the sidelines to cheer on his teammates despite the injury; he was subsequently placed on season-ending injured reserve.
