= Windsor Hanger =

Windsor Hanger Western (born October 11, 1988) is an entrepreneur who co-founded Her Campus, an online college magazine geared toward college women. At Her Campus, Hanger Western is currently president and publisher. She is a 2010 graduate from Harvard University with a Bachelor's degree in history of science.

== Her Campus ==
Hanger Western met Stephanie Kaplan Lewis and Annie Wang while the three of them were undergraduates at Harvard. The three of them proposed a business plan for Her Campus, a national online magazine with individualized branches for specific colleges and universities across the country, and won the Harvard Student Agencies Investment Award as a winner in the i3 Innovation Challenge. Her Campus was then launched in September 2009.

== Awards ==
Hanger Western was named to Inc. magazine's Inc. magazine's "30 Under 30 Coolest Young Entrepreneurs" for 2010, Glamour magazine's "20 Amazing Young Women", and The Boston Globe's "25 Most Stylish Bostonians for 2010 Hanger Western was the 2016 winner of Target Magazine's Target Marketer of the Year. Hanger Western, Kaplan Lewis and Wang were named to the Forbes 30 under 30 in 2017 as Her Campus Media.

== Personal life ==
Hanger Western married Alex Western in 2013. She currently resides in Atlanta, Georgia, with her husband and their two daughters.

== See also ==
- Ypulse interview
- College Media Matters
- She Takes On The World interview
- Women Grow Business interview
- BNet article
- Wallet Pop article
- College Media Beat
