= Oakwood City School District =

School district in Ohio, United States

Address
- 20 Rubicon Road Dayton, Ohio, 45409; United States

District information
- Type: Public
- Motto: Academic Excellence Since 1908
- Grades: PK–12
- Established: 1908; 118 years ago
- Superintendent: Dr. Neil Gupta
- Schools: 5
- NCES District ID: 3904458

Students and staff
- Students: 2,002 (2024–2025)
- Teachers: 129.52 (on an FTE basis) (2024–2025)
- Staff: 290.55 (on an FTE basis) (2024–2025)
- Student–teacher ratio: 15.46 (2024–2025)

Other information
- Website: www.oakwoodschools.org

Oakwood City School District (Est. 1908) serves Oakwood, Montgomery County, Ohio, United States. The district operates five schools: Oakwood High School, Oakwood Junior High, Edwin D. Smith Elementary School, Harman Elementary School, and The Julian & Marjorie Lange School. The district was ranked 6th among Ohio's 610 school districts in 2007.
