= Dayton Project =

- Unit III, Dayton Project
- U.S. National Register of Historic Places
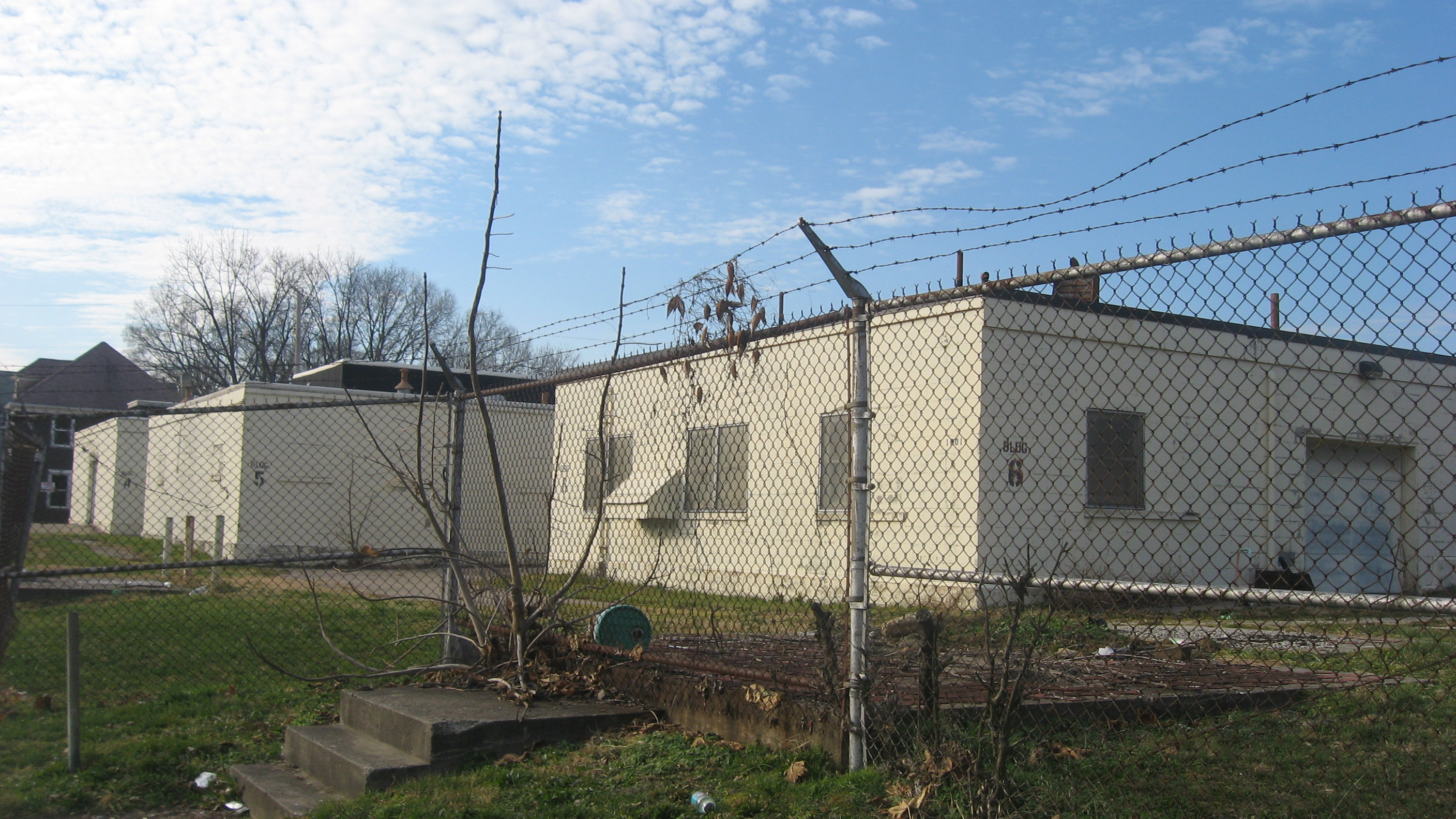
- Buildings at Unit III, seen in 2012

- Location within Ohio Location within the United States
- Location: Dayton, Ohio
- Coordinates: 39°43′29″N 84°10′46″W
- Built: 1944–1945
- NRHP reference No.: 06000480
- Added to NRHP: 10 May 2006

The Dayton Project was a research and development project to produce polonium during World War II, as part of the larger Manhattan Project to build the first atomic bombs. Work took place at several sites in and around Dayton, Ohio. Those working on the project were ultimately responsible for creating the polonium-based modulated neutron initiators that were used to begin the chain reactions in the atomic bombs.

The Dayton Project began in 1943 when Monsanto's Charles Allen Thomas was recruited by the Manhattan Project to coordinate the plutonium purification and production work being carried out at various sites. Scientists at the Los Alamos Laboratory calculated that a plutonium bomb would require a neutron initiator. The best-known neutron sources used radioactive polonium and beryllium, so Thomas undertook to produce polonium at Monsanto's laboratories in Dayton. While most Manhattan Project activity took place at remote locations, the Dayton Project was located in a populated, urban area. It ran from 1943 to 1949, when the Mound Laboratories were completed in nearby Miamisburg, Ohio, and the work moved there.

The Dayton Project developed techniques for extracting polonium from the lead dioxide ore in which it occurs naturally, and from bismuth targets that had been bombarded by neutrons in a nuclear reactor. Ultimately, polonium-based neutron initiators were used in both the gun-type Little Boy and the implosion-type Fat Man used in the atomic bombings of Hiroshima and Nagasaki respectively. The fact that polonium was used as an initiator was classified until the 1960s, but George Koval, a technician with the Manhattan Project's Special Engineer Detachment, penetrated the Dayton Project as a spy for the Soviet Union.

== Background ==
In December 1942, during World War II, Charles Allen Thomas, a chemist and director of research at Monsanto in St. Louis, joined the National Defense Research Committee (NDRC) as the deputy chief of its Division 8, which was responsible for propellants, explosives and the like. Early in 1943, he traveled to the east with Richard C. Tolman, a member of the NDRC, and James B. Conant, the president of Harvard University and the chairman of the NDRC, to witness a demonstration of a new underwater explosive. Conant and Tolman took the opportunity to quietly investigate Thomas' background. He was then invited to a meeting in Washington D.C., with Brigadier General Leslie R. Groves, Jr., the director of the wartime Manhattan Project responsible for building an atomic bomb. When he got there, Thomas found Conant was also present.

Groves and Conant were hoping to harness Thomas's industrial expertise. They offered him a post as a deputy to Robert Oppenheimer, the director of the Los Alamos Laboratory in New Mexico, but he did not wish to move his family or give up his responsibilities at Monsanto. Instead, he accepted the role of coordinating the plutonium purification and production work being carried out at Los Alamos, the Metallurgical Laboratory in Chicago, Radiation Laboratory in Berkeley, and Ames Laboratory in Iowa. Chemistry and metallurgy at Los Alamos would be led by the youthful Joseph W. Kennedy.

At Los Alamos, physicist Robert Serber proposed that instead of relying on spontaneous fission, the chain reaction inside the atomic bomb should be triggered by a neutron initiator. The best-known neutron sources were radium-beryllium and polonium-beryllium. The latter was chosen, as polonium has a 138-day half-life, which made it intense enough to be useful but not long-lived enough to be stockpiled. Thomas took charge of the development of techniques to industrially refine polonium for use with beryllium in the "urchin" internal neutron initiators. This effort became the Dayton Project.

== Organization ==
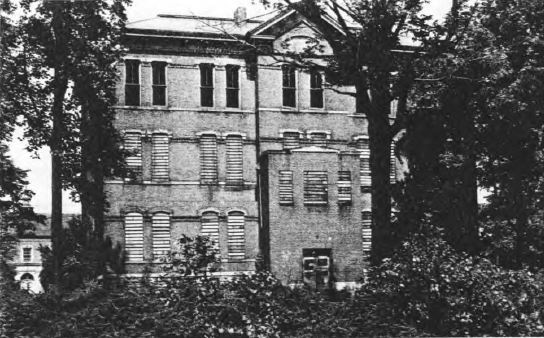
Dayton Project – Unit III in September 1943

Thomas brought in key personnel from Monsanto's Thomas and Hochwalt Laboratories in Dayton, Ohio, including Caroll Hochwalt, James Lum and Nicholas Samaras. Thomas became Director of the Dayton Project, with Hochwalt as Assistant Project Director and Lum as Laboratory Director. They decided that about twelve chemists would be required, and Lum set about recruiting professors, graduate students and industrial chemists from universities and laboratories in the area. The first of these recruits commenced in August 1943, but few had any experience with radiochemistry. Numbers increased from 46 full-time employees at the end of 1943 to 101 at the end of 1944, 201 at the end of 1945, and 334 at the end of 1946, including 34 members of the Army's Special Engineer Detachment.

== Locations ==
Office space was initially found in the Monsanto offices at 1515 Nicholas Rd, which became known as Unit I. Unit II was the Monsanto Rocket Propellant works off Betty Lane near Ohio State Route 741. While it was administered by Monsanto, it was not used by the Dayton Project. The site handled explosives including ammonium nitrate and ammonium picrate, but no radioactive materials were handled there. Work at Unit II ceased in the fall of 1945. Consideration was given to using it in December 1946, but this proposal was rejected in favor of erecting a Quonset hut at Unit III.

A laboratory site was found at 1601 W. First Street that had originally been constructed to house the Bonebrake Seminary. It was a three-story brick building built in 1879, and owned by the Dayton Board of Education, which used it as a warehouse. Monsanto leased the site on 15 October 1943, and began converting it into a laboratory known as Unit III. The building was in poor shape when the Dayton Project took it over, with many broken windows, and the staircase between the second and third floors was missing. New heating and lighting were installed, windows were replaced, new flooring was laid, and some rooms were re-plastered. A pair of guard houses known as buildings J and K were added, as was a chemical storage shed known as building F, and a wire fence. Laboratory activities were transferred there from Unit I on 25 September. Initially only the bottom two floors were occupied, providing 560 square meters (6,000 sq ft) of laboratory space. Later, the third floor was taken over as well, providing another 280 square meters (3,000 sq ft). In May 1945, five additional temporary buildings were constructed on land leased from the Board of Education that housed offices, a cafeteria, locker rooms, a physics laboratory and a laundry. A new guardhouse was also built. To this was added two portable buildings in 1946.

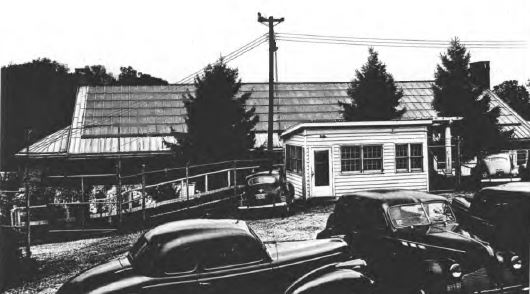
Dayton Project – Unit IV in October 1947

By 1944, space was running short, and Monsanto began negotiations to acquire the Runnymede Playhouse in the wealthy residential Dayton suburb of Oakwood. Built in 1927, the Playhouse was a leisure facility that included an outdoor swimming pool, a ballroom, a squash court, a tennis court with a cork floor and a stage for community theater. It had showers with Italian marble and a 1 1/2-story garage. The estate was owned by the Talbott Realty Company, which was controlled by Thomas's wife's family. The Talbotts were among the heirs of the Delco company, which was by then a part of General Motors. The Oakwood City Council wanted the Playhouse as a community center. Thomas appeared before the council and assured them that it would not be damaged, although he could not disclose what he was intending to use it for. When Talbott Realty proved reluctant to sell, the United States Army Corps of Engineers condemned the property, which became Unit IV on 15 February 1944. A lease was signed on 10 March 1944, under which the Talbott Realty was paid $4,266.72 per annum for the property. The lease was initially up to 30 June 1944, but was then extended annually until 30 June 1949. The lease specified that the property would be returned in its original condition. Talbott Realty were told that the property would be used to produce training films.

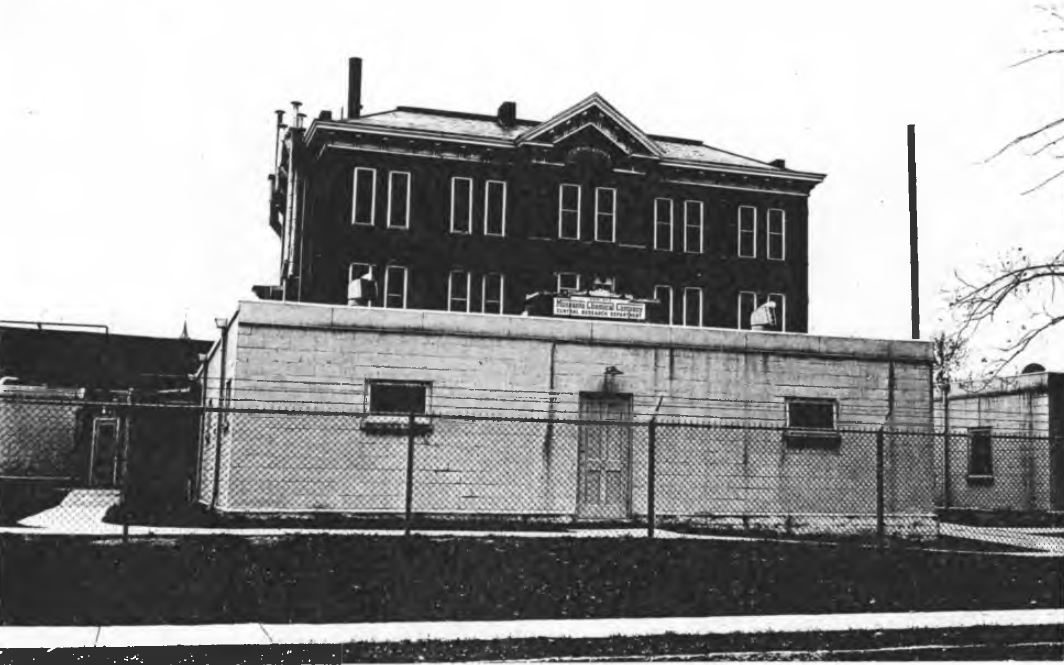
Dayton Project – Unit III in October 1947

Remodeling began on 17 March 1944. The tennis courts were subdivided into multiple rooms. The ceiling was lowered, and heating, air conditioning and air filtration systems were added. One of the greenhouses was converted into a loading dock. The property was enclosed in a barbed wire fence that was floodlit by night, and patrolled around the clock by armed guards; there were 43 guards at Units III and IV. The Production Group began moving in on 1 June. Three guard houses were added, along with a wire fence. Changes to the site were minimized in order to make it easier to restore later. Because it was located in a residential area, efforts were also made to minimize noise and other disruptions.

In May 1945, Monsanto rented three floors of a warehouse at 601 East Third Street from General Electric. Initially it was used to receive and store equipment used by the Project. Later the fourth floor was used as office space, and a laboratory was established on the fifth floor where studies were carried out on the effects of polonium on laboratory animals. Analysis of bioassay samples was carried out there to minimize the danger of polonium contamination of the samples.

== Research ==
Few people had seen polonium before. It was a silvery metal. In a dark room, it gave off an eerie, purple glow. Polonium occurs naturally in various ores, and the lead dioxide residues from the refinery in Port Hope, Ontario, left over after the removal of uranium and radium, were estimated to contain 0.2 to 0.3 milligrams (0.0031 to 0.0046 gr) of polonium per metric ton. A curie of polonium weighs about 0.2 milligrams (0.0031 gr). Port Hope was already under contract from the Manhattan Project for the supply and refining of uranium ore. The first 3,290 kilograms (7,250 lb) of radioactive lead dioxide was delivered to the Dayton Project on 10 November 1943. The first 230-kilogram (500 lb) batch was processed by 8 December, which made 30 microcuries (1.1 MBq) of polonium available for experiments a week later.

Three processes were investigated for extracting the polonium from the ore. J. H. Dillon of the Firestone Tire and Rubber Company had patented a process in which the lead oxide was dissolved in hydrochloric acid:

PbO_{2} + 4 HCl → PbCl_{2} + Cl_{2} + 2H_{2}O

The polonium could then be deposited on copper or nickel sheets. This required large-scale glass-lined equipment not available in Dayton, but available at the Monsanto B plant in Monsanto, Illinois. After small-scale tests at Unit III revealed that the process was practical, some three tons of lead dioxide were sent to the B plant, and 2.50 curies (93 GBq) were recovered. Getting the polonium off the copper and nickel sheets proved more problematic.

A second method attempted was a kiln process. The idea was to simply roast the lead dioxide and vaporize the polonium. The problem was that lead dioxide slagged at 700 °C (1,292 °F), which was too low for the process to work. So lead orthophosphate was tried, which slagged at 900 °C (1,650 °F). This was made by mixing the lead dioxide with phosphoric acid. Experiments showed that the polonium vaporized well when the lead orthophosphate was heated to 750 °C (1,380 °F) for four hours. Unfortunately, the process then ran into problems with dust and other foreign matter, and with contamination of the personnel and equipment involved.

The third method involved dissolving the lead dioxide in a mixture of concentrated nitric acid and hydrogen peroxide:

PbO_{2} + 2HNO_{3} + H_{2}O_{2} → Pb(NO_{3})_{2} + O_{2} + 2H_{2}O

This proved to be the best way to separate the polonium from the lead dioxide, although there were problems with the precipitation of various contaminants, including iron and aluminum. Although about 32 metric tons (35 short tons) of lead dioxide were treated with nitric acid, and about 40 curies (1.5 TBq) of polonium were produced, the process did not proceed beyond the pilot stage because a better source of polonium became available. The lead dioxide was not purchased by the Manhattan Project, and early in the war had been acquired by the Canadian government. In June 1945, the lead was precipitated as a lead carbonate slurry, and shipped to the Manhattan District's Madison Square area to be dried and returned to Canada.

== Production ==
Polonium could also be produced by neutron irradiation of bismuth. In 1943 the only polonium produced in this manner was in cyclotrons, but the Manhattan Project's development of nuclear reactors offered the prospect of producing large amounts of polonium in this manner:

^{209}_{83}Bi + n → ^{210}_{83}Bi → ^{210}_{84}Po + β

A metric ton of bismuth irradiated in the Manhattan Project's X-10 Graphite Reactor at the Clinton Engineer Works in Oak Ridge, Tennessee, contained 32 to 83 curies (1.2 to 3.1 TBq) of polonium, a vast improvement over the yields from Port Hope's lead dioxide. Irradiated bismuth came from Clinton in the form of 30.5-by-9.5-by-9.5-centimeter (12 by 3.75 by 3.75 in) bricks that weighed about 26 kilograms (58 lb). They were shipped to Dayton by rail in wooden boxes, which were stored in a tile-lined cavity in the floor at Unit IV.

These procedures were adequate because the quantity of polonium in the bismuth was still fairly low, but starting in June 1945, the Dayton Project began receiving bismuth irradiated in the more powerful reactors at the Hanford Site in Washington, which now became the major source of supply. Even at Clinton, unprotected bismuth proved problematic when a brick broke apart and chips fell into containers of uranium slugs, and had to be hazardously separated by hand by project personnel. Bismuth slugs irradiated in the reactors at Hanford were therefore canned in aluminium. The canned slugs were 3.8 centimeters (1.5 in) in diameter, and 10 or 20 centimeters (4 or 8 in) long. The problem was that the aluminium contained impurities such as iron, manganese, copper, lead, tin, zinc, silicon, titanium, nickel, magnesium, chromium, vanadium, bismuth and gallium, and when irradiated, these could form radioactive isotopes. Most were of little concern for the Dayton Project, as they had short half-lives, and would become harmless during the slugs' cooling off period in water at Hanford; but iron could form iron-59, which had a half-life of 45 days, and produced gamma radiation. The slugs were therefore shipped in casks, each of which contained several tubes which held the slugs. The spaces between the tubes was filled with lead. At Dayton, the slugs were stored in a lead-lined safe with doors on both sides containing tubes. They were also stored underwater on racks, and could be removed with tongs. A periscope allowed the identification markings on the slugs to be checked without removing them from the pool.

By the end of 1946 Hanford was shipping material that contained up to 13,200 curies (490 TBq) per metric ton of bismuth. Bismuth was purchased from the American Smelting and Refining Company of the highest purity that it could produce. It was sent to Hanford, where it was canned, and placed inside a reactor for 100 days. The irradiated slugs were then shipped by road to Unit IV, where they were bathed in hydrochloric acid, which dissolved the aluminum. This formed an aluminum chloride solution that was disposed of, as it was highly radioactive due to the iron impurities in the aluminum. The bismuth slugs were then dissolved in aqua regia. This was too weak for electroplating the polonium, so the nitric acid was removed, and then the polonium deposited on bismuth by adding powdered bismuth. This resulted in a 100–1 concentration. This could then be repeated by dissolving in aqua regia again to achieve a 1000–1 concentration. This was again dissolved, and the polonium electroplated on platinum foils. The main problem with the process was that it required glass-lined containers due to the aqua regia, and mechanisms for safe handling of the radioactive material. The Dayton Project explored alternative purification methods that were found to be workable, but less efficient or safe.

The first consignment of polonium left for Los Alamos on 15 March 1944 in a lead-lined suitcase carried by a military courier. Regular shipments were made thereafter. Initiator testing at Los Alamos required more polonium than anticipated, and in December 1944, Oppenheimer was forced to ask Thomas if he could ship 20 curies (0.74 TBq) per month. The Dayton Project was able to do so. In February 1945, Thomas agreed to increase shipments to 100 curies (3.7 TBq) per month by June, and 500 per month by December.

The total cost of the Dayton Project up to the end of 1946 was $3,666,507 ($60.5 million in today's dollars).

Estimated final cost of the Dayton Project
Date	Cost
May–November 1943	$133,275.42
January–December 1944	$996,538.41
January–December 1945	$1,131,644.59
January–December 1946	$1,605,048.93
Total expenditures 1943–1946	$3,866,507.35

== Health and safety ==
Dayton Project employees were not allowed to eat or smoke in processing areas, and had to scrub their hands before leaving these areas. The chemists wore protective gear, with surgical, cloth and rubber gloves worn in three layers. When leaving for lunch or at the end of the shift, they had to wash their hands with dilute hydrochloric acid, dilute Clorox, and soap. The radioactive residue on their hands was measured with a special Geiger counter designed for the purpose by physicist John J. Sopka. No more than one thousand counts per minute per hand was permissible. They had to shower at the end of each day's work, and were subjected to weekly urine tests. Employees with elevated levels of polonium were not allowed in the processing areas. Working with polonium without spreading contamination proved to be almost impossible. Fortunately, it is not a bone seeker like radium or plutonium, and is thus readily excreted in urine. Detection methods had already been developed, making it easy to track. The employee at Unit IV with the highest levels of polonium in her urine had contaminated her hair, and often held bobby pins in her mouth.

== Espionage ==
George Koval was drafted into the United States Army in 1943, and was inducted into the Manhattan Project's Special Engineer Detachment. He was initially assigned to the Clinton Engineer Works, where his job as a health physics officer gave him access to much of the site. He began passing secrets relating to the production of polonium at Oak Ridge to the Soviet Union through his GRU (Soviet military intelligence) handler code-named "Clyde". In 1945 Koval was transferred to Dayton. Again, his job as a health physics officer gave him wide access to the secret installation. In 2007 Russian President Vladimir Putin posthumously awarded Koval a gold star, making him a hero of the Russian Federation for his work as the GRU spy "Delmar". Russian officials stated that the initiator for their Joe-1 bomb had been "prepared to the recipe provided by Delmar". The fact that polonium was used as an initiator remained classified until the 1960s.

== Initiators ==
After Leonard I. Schiff calculated that an initiator might improve the efficiency of a gun-type fission weapon, Oppenheimer gave approval on 15 March 1945 for initiators to be included in the Little Boy design. The initiators were tested to ensure they were rugged enough to handle being transported in an airplane and being accidentally dropped. Eventually, about forty initiators were dispatched to Tinian, where four were inserted into the bomb that was used in the bombing of Hiroshima.

The initiator used in the implosion design of the Fat Man bomb that was dropped on Nagasaki was code-named "urchin". In order to increase the efficiency of the explosion, the initiator had to emit a large number of neutrons in a few microseconds while the plutonium core was fully compressed. At the heart of the urchin was a solid beryllium sphere 0.4 centimeters (0.16 in) in diameter. This was gold-plated and coated with 20 curies (0.74 TBq) of polonium. The gold kept the polonium's alpha particles from striking the beryllium. This fitted inside two beryllium hemispheres with 15 parallel grooves cut into the inner surface. These grooves converted the shock wave of the implosion into jets that shattered the spheres and caused the beryllium and polonium to mix and emit neutrons. The hemispheres were nickel-plated and the outer surface was coated in gold and 30 curies (1.1 TBq) of polonium. The 2.0-centimeter (0.79 in) initiator, which was hot to the touch, fitted neatly inside the 20-millimeter (0.8 in) hole in the center of the plutonium pit.

== Mound Laboratories ==
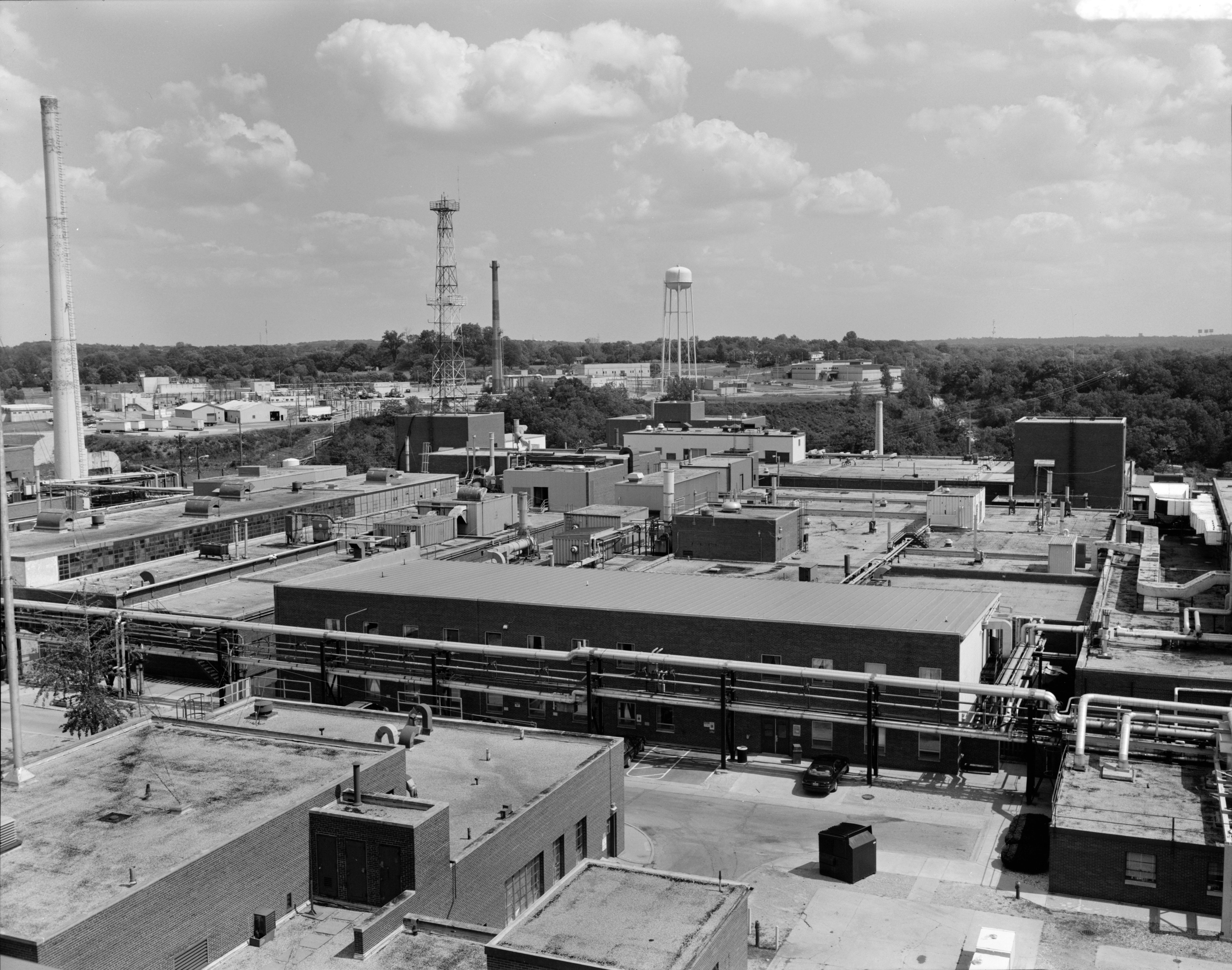
View looking southeast over the Mound Laboratories

By 1945, the Dayton Project had assumed such importance that the Manhattan Project decided to make it into a permanent facility. The original intention was to move operations to Oak Ridge, but it was decided that a site near Dayton was preferable. Few of the scientific and technical staff wanted to move to Tennessee, and there were concerns about the dangers of polonium contamination at a plutonium processing site. A search for a suitable site began in early 1946, and one was found in Miamisburg, about 19 kilometers (12 mi) from Dayton. The 72-hectare (178-acre) site was next to a state park containing a large prehistoric Indian burial mound, which ultimately gave the Mound Laboratories its name. It was initially known as Unit V. Monsanto began construction in May 1946, using the Detroit firm of Giffels and Vallet as architects, while the plant was built by the Maxon Construction of Dayton. The design called for an underground complex that could withstand a direct hit from a 910-kilogram (2,000 lb) bomb, with protection against biological and chemical weapons, at a cost of $17,900,000.

Responsibility for nuclear weapons production was transferred from the Manhattan Project to the Atomic Energy Commission in 1947, but work continued on the Mound Laboratories. The first building was completed in May 1948, and polonium processing commenced at the Mound Laboratories in February 1949. Altogether, 14 major buildings were constructed with a total floor space of 34,000 square meters (366,000 ft^{2}) at a cost of $25.5 million. Due to fear of attack or sabotage, the former Scioto Laboratory Complex in Marion, Ohio, was acquired by the Atomic Energy Commission in 1948. It was maintained as a cold standby site until it was no longer needed in 1953.

== Site cleanup ==
Unit I continued to be used by Monsanto as an administrative facility until 1988, when it was demolished. The land was sold to Quality Chemicals in 1992, and then to DuPont in 2002. Unit III, the former Bonebrake Theological Seminary, was decontaminated in 1950 and returned to the Dayton Board of Education. The original seminary building was subsequently demolished, but several structures remain from the Dayton Project. The site was listed on the National Register of Historic Places on 10 May 2006. Although the lease on Unit IV, the former Runnymede Playhouse, specified that it was to be returned, it was deemed to be too contaminated. The building was demolished in February 1950. The cobblestones in the driveway were removed and taken away, along with 2.1 meters (7 ft) of earth from under the house. The excavation was filled in, and the site was returned to the Talbott family, who were paid $138,750 in compensation. As of 2017, all that remains of the original playhouse is a brass doorknob and part of the greenhouse roof, which are part of the collection of the Mound Science and Energy Museum. Private residences now occupy the site. The Dayton Warehouse was decontaminated in 1950 and returned to its owners. The Mound Laboratories continued to produce polonium initiators until 1969. Polonium continued to be produced there for commercial sales and use in satellites until 1972. The laboratories were decommissioned in 1993, and the area was decontaminated. As of 2017, it houses the Mound Advanced Technology Center.

In 1996, the Department of Energy, which had succeeded the Atomic Energy Commission, decided that since the Dayton sites already had been decontaminated, they did not warrant inclusion in the Army Corps of Engineers' Formerly Utilized Sites Remedial Action Program (FUSRAP). The local community in Dayton was concerned that the cleanup did not meet 21st-century environmental standards. Therefore, the state of Ohio asked the United States Congress to have the Army Corps of Engineers conduct a review. This was carried out in 2004 and 2005. The review concluded that no radioactive contaminants were found that would warrant inclusion in FUSRAP.
