= Her Campus =

Online magazine targeted at female college students

- Website type: Online magazine
- Available in: English
- Founders: Stephanie Kaplan; Windsor Hanger Western; Annie Wang
- Website: hercampus.com
- Commercial: Yes
- Registration: Optional
- Launched: 2009
- Current status: Online
- Content license: Copyright

Her Campus is an online magazine targeted at the female college student demographic. It is based in Boston, Massachusetts at 9 Lansdowne St Suite 2.

In November 2010, Glamour Magazine honored Her Campus' founders at its Women of the Year Awards ceremony, where they were presented with the Amazing Young Women Award from Chelsea Clinton.

== Historical background ==
In January 2009, Stephanie Kaplan Lewis, Windsor Hanger Western, and Annie Wang entered the i3 Innovation Challenge sponsored by Harvard Student Agencies, the Technology and Entrepreneurship Center at Harvard, and the Harvard College Forum. The Challenge rewards business ventures presented by students. The team of women proposed a national online magazine for college women, with student branches at colleges and universities across the United States. After their business plan and proposal received the Harvard Student Agencies Investment Award, they launched Her Campus magazine. The award secured financial assistance and free office space.

== Business overview ==
The website was launched in September 2009. The online magazine runs feature articles targeted toward college survival. Hanger Western serves the magazine as the president and publisher, while Kaplan Lewis functions as the CEO and editor-in-chief. Wang is the Chief Technology Officer and creative director.

The magazine is represented by students at over 380 college campuses in the U.S., Canada, Jamaica, the UK, Japan, and Australia. Each branch has one or two campus correspondents who serve as president and editor-in-chief. These correspondents develops articles and photos for their university.

In 2018, "My Campus" chapters are in South Africa, Puerto Rico, Nigeria, Ireland, India, and Quebec, in addition to the international chapters, and Her Campus Media was named to the Forbes magazine "30 under 30" list under the media category.

Support from influential individuals includes board member Cathryn Cronin Cranston, publisher of the Columbia Journalism Review. Additionally, Joanna Coles, U.S. editor-in-chief of Cosmopolitan, serves as a mentor. These partnerships have allowed Her Campus writers to share their articles with Seventeen Magazine and The Huffington Post.

In May 2019, Her Campus Media acquired the Lala Media Group, Inc., and in August 2019, Her Campus Media acquired College Fashionista.

== Public relations ==
In addition to the online magazine, Her Campus Media LLC, the owner and operator of Her Campus, functions as a marketing and public relations firm. Its clients have included New Balance, Rent the Runway, and Juicy Couture. The firm reports around 100,000 hits daily.

Since the initial launch, Her Campus has been featured or mentioned in The New York Times, Yahoo Finance, CNN Money, AOL Money College, CBS MoneyWatch, The Boston Globe, U.S. News & World Report, Seventeen magazine, Business Insider, ABC News Now, and the FOX network affiliate in Boston.

== Event ==
=== Her Conference ===
Her Conference is an annual summer conference by Her Campus Media that is held in New York City and was once held in Los Angeles in 2019. The conference was launched in 2012 and focuses on teaching female college students more about marketing, journalism, and the media. Past keynote speakers include Jason Waganheim, the publisher and chief revenue officer of Teen Vogue, and Chandra Turner, the executive editor of Parents magazine and U.S. Ambassador.

=== College Fashion Week ===
College Fashion Week is an annual fashion-showcasing fall event by Her Campus Media which takes place in Boston and New York City. The event was first launched in 2013. Past sponsors of College Fashion Week include Primark, Ulta Beauty, Acuvue, PopSugar, and StudentUniverse.

== Network ==
=== Her Campus Chapter Network ===
As of 2024, Her Campus Chapter Network consists of more than 380 chapters worldwide, with more than 7,500 chapter members.

=== InfluenceHer Collective ===
InfluenceHer Collective is a network of blogs and vlogs written by female influencers.
