= Modulated neutron initiator =

Neutron source used in some nuclear weapons

A modulated neutron initiator is a neutron source capable of producing a burst of neutrons on activation. It is a crucial part of some nuclear weapons, as its role is to "kick-start" the chain reaction at the optimal moment when the configuration is prompt critical. It is also known as an internal neutron initiator. The initiator is typically placed in the center of the plutonium pit, and is activated by impact of the converging shock wave.

One of the key elements in the proper operation of a nuclear weapon is initiation of the fission chain reaction at the proper time. To obtain a significant nuclear yield, sufficient neutrons must be present within the supercritical core at the right time. If the chain reaction starts too soon ("predetonation"), the result will be only a 'fizzle yield', well below the design specification. If it occurs too late, the core will have begun to expand and disassemble into a less-dense state, leading to a lowered yield (less of the core material undergoes fission) or no yield at all (the core is no longer a critical mass). Therefore, low spontaneous neutron emission of the pit material is crucial.

For boosted fission weapons, the size of the centrally placed initiator is critical and has to be as small as possible. The use of an external neutron source allows more flexibility, such as variable yields.

== Design ==
The usual design is based on a combination of beryllium-9 and polonium-210, separated until activation, then placed in intimate contact by the shock wave. Polonium-208 and actinium-227 were also considered as alpha sources. The isotope used must have strong alpha emissions and weak gamma emissions, as gamma photons can also knock neutrons loose and cannot be so efficiently shielded as alpha particles. Several variants were developed, differing by the dimensions and mechanical configuration of the system ensuring proper mixing of the metals.

=== Urchin ===
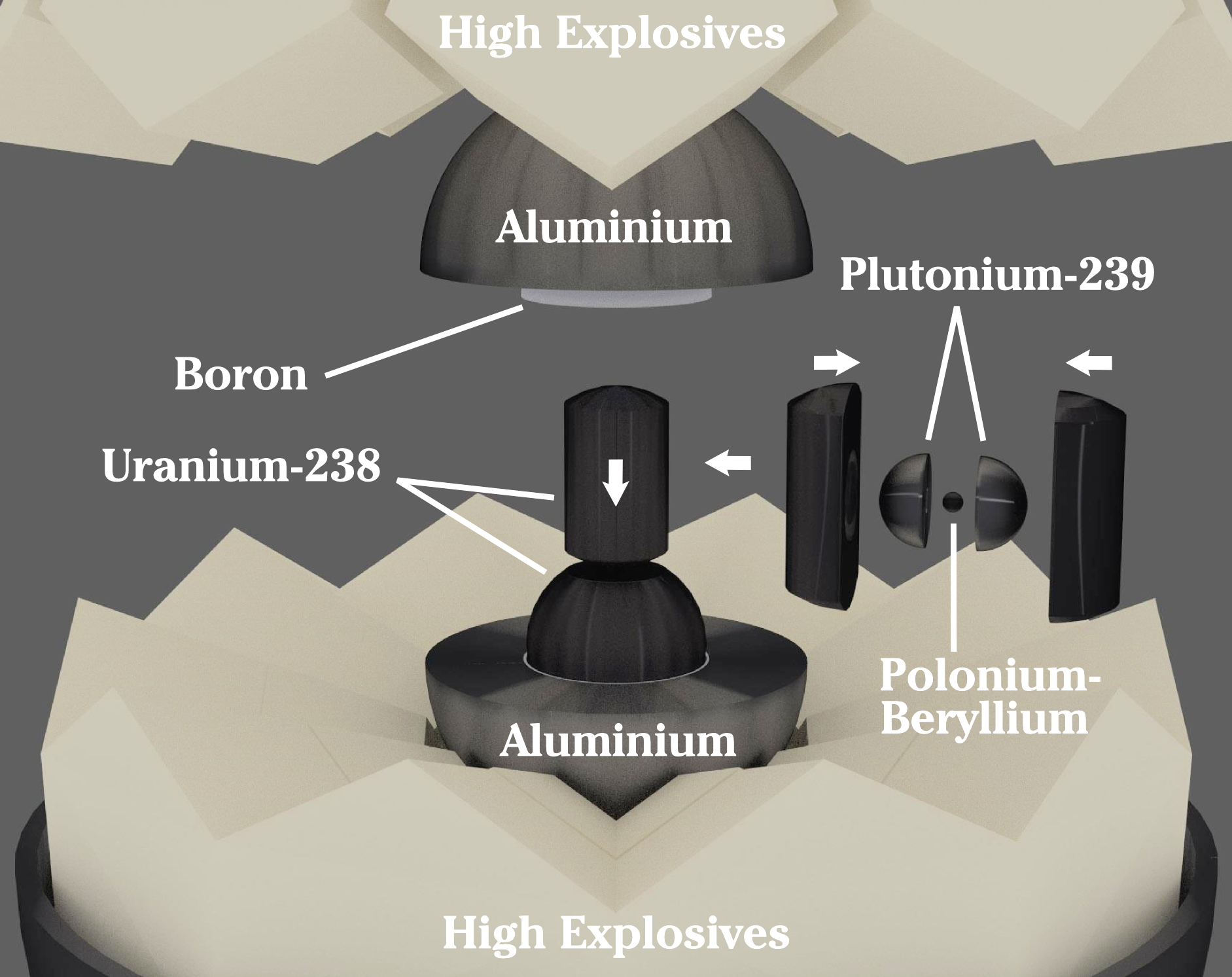
Basic nuclear components of the Fat Man design. The "urchin" is the polonium–beryllium sphere.

Urchin was the code name for the internal neutron initiator used by the Los Alamos Laboratory as a neutron generating device to trigger the nuclear detonation of the earliest plutonium atomic bombs such as The Gadget and Fat Man, once the critical mass had been 'assembled' by the force of conventional explosives.

The initiator used in the early devices, located at the center of the bomb's plutonium pit, consisted of a beryllium pellet and a beryllium shell with polonium-210 between the two. The pellet, 8 mm (1/3 in) in diameter, was coated with nickel and then a layer of gold. The beryllium shell was of 20 mm (4/5 in) outer diameter with wall thickness of 6 mm (1/4 in). The inner surface of that shell had 15 concentric, wedge-shaped latitudinal grooves and was, like the inner sphere, coated with gold and nickel. A small amount of polonium-210 (50 curies, 11 mg) was deposited in the grooves of the shell and on the central sphere: the layers of gold and nickel served to shield the beryllium from alpha particles emitted by the polonium. The whole urchin weighed about 7 grams (1/4 ounce) and was attached to mounting brackets in a 2.5 cm (1-inch) diameter inner cavity in the pit.

When the shock wave from the implosion of the plutonium core arrives, it crushes the initiator. Hydrodynamic forces acting on the grooved shell thoroughly and virtually instantly mix the beryllium and polonium, allowing the alpha particles from the polonium to impinge on the beryllium atoms. Reacting to alpha particle bombardment, the beryllium atoms emit neutrons at a rate of about 1 neutron every 5–10 nanoseconds (See Beryllium). These neutrons trigger the chain reaction in the compressed supercritical plutonium. Placing the polonium layer between two large masses of beryllium ensures contact of the metals even if the shock wave turbulence performs poorly.

The 50 curies of polonium generated about 0.1 watts of decay heat, noticeably warming the small sphere.

The grooves in the inner surface of the shell shaped the shock wave into jets by the Munroe effect, similar to a shaped charge, for fast and thorough mixing of the beryllium and polonium. As the Munroe effect is less reliable in linear geometry, later designs used a sphere with conical or pyramidal inner indentations instead of linear grooves. Some initiator designs omit the central sphere, being hollow instead. The advantage of a hollow design is possibly managing a smaller size while retaining reliability.

The short half-life of polonium-210 (138 days) necessitated frequent replacement of initiators and a continued supply of polonium for their manufacture, as their shelf life was only about 4 months. Later designs had shelf life as long as 1 year.

The US government used "Postum" as a code name for polonium.

Use of polonium for the neutron initiator was proposed in 1944 by Edward Condon, although polonium as an initiator was mentioned as a possibility in the "Los Alamos Primer" lectures given in April 1943. The final "urchin" initiator was designed by James L. Tuck and Hans Bethe and its development and testing was carried out at Los Alamos National Laboratory in "Gadget" division's initiator group led by Charles Critchfield. Other polonium-beryllium initiator designs were considered, but the choice of "urchin" as the production design was made in early May 1945, with input from Enrico Fermi and Niels Bohr.

It has been estimated that the initiators used in the wartime weapons produced on the order of 100 neutrons during the critical ~1 microsecond of assembly time.

=== Abner ===
A different initiator (code named ABNER) was used for the Little Boy uranium bomb. Its design was simpler and it contained less polonium. It was activated by the impact of the uranium projectile to the target. It was added to the design as an afterthought and was not essential for the weapon's function.

=== TOM initiator ===
An improved construction of the initiator, probably based on conical or pyramidal indentations, was proposed in 1948, put into production by Los Alamos in January 1950, and tested in May 1951. The TOM design used less polonium, as the number of neutrons per milligram of polonium was higher than of the Urchin. Its outer diameter was only 1 cm. The first live fire test of a TOM initiator occurred on 28-Jan-1951 during the Baker-1 shot of Operation Ranger. A series of calibration experiments for initiation time vs yield data of the TOM initiators was done during the Operation Snapper, during the Fox test on 25 May 1952.

=== Flower ===
In 1974, India performed the Smiling Buddha nuclear test. The initiator, codenamed "Flower", was based on the same principle as the Urchin. It is believed the polonium was deposited on lotus-shaped platinum gauze to maximize its surface and enclosed in a tantalum sphere surrounded by a uranium shell with embedded beryllium pellets. According to other sources, the design was more similar to the Urchin, with a beryllium shell shaped to create beryllium jets upon implosion. The initiator outer diameter is reported as 1.5 cm, or "about 2 cm".

=== Other designs ===
Uranium deuteride (UD_{3}) can be used for construction of a neutron multiplier.

Boosted fission weapons and weapons using external neutron generators offer the possibility of variable yield, allowing selection of the weapon's power depending on the tactical needs.

== Development ==
The polonium used in the urchin initiator was created at Oak Ridge National Laboratory and then extracted and purified as part of the Dayton Project under the leadership of Charles Allen Thomas. The Dayton Project was one of the various sites comprising the Manhattan Project.

In 1949, Mound Laboratories in nearby Miamisburg, Ohio opened as a replacement for the Dayton Project and the new home of nuclear initiator research & development. Polonium-210 was produced by neutron irradiation of bismuth. Production and research of polonium at Mound was phased out in 1971.

Polonium from Dayton was used by the G Division of Los Alamos in initiator design studies at a test site in Sandia Canyon. The initiator group built test assemblies by drilling holes in large turbine ball bearings, inserting the active material, and plugging the holes with bolts. These test assemblies were known as screwballs. The test assemblies were imploded and their remains studied to examine how well the polonium and beryllium mixed.

The production of the beryllium-polonium TOM initiators ended in 1953. The initiators were replaced with a different design, which slightly reduced the weapon yield but its longer shelf life reduced the complexity of the logistics. The sealed neutron initiator, brought into inventory in late 1954, still required a periodic disassembly to access its capsule for maintenance checks. The capsules were phased out completely in 1962.

Urchin style initiators were later superseded by other means of generating neutrons such as pulsed neutron emitters that do not use polonium. Using tritium with a half-life of 12.3 years instead of polonium they have a much longer replacement interval. These are mounted outside the pit and electrically controlled, since neutrons easily pass through considerable mass without interactions. These initiators were more controllable and enable much improved weapon reliability.

== See also ==
- Nuclear weapon design
- Dayton Project
- Blue Stone (neutron initiator)
