= Annie Wang (entrepreneur) =

American businesswoman

Annie Wang (born January 9, 1989) is an American businesswoman. She is a co-founder of Her Campus Media, a digital media company aimed at college students and young women, and is its chief product officer.

== Career ==
Wang was an undergraduate at Harvard University when she and two fellow students, Stephanie Kaplan Lewis and Windsor Hanger Western, drew up a business plan for an online magazine aimed at college women. The three women proposed a business plan in March 2009 and won the Harvard Student Agencies Investment Award in the i3 Innovation Challenge. Her Campus was launched in September 2009.

Wang's responsibilities at the company cover product, design and technology. In 2010 the three co-founders were included in Inc. magazine's "30 Under 30" list of young entrepreneurs. In 2017 Her Campus Media was named to the media category of the Forbes 30 Under 30 list.

The company expanded by acquisition, buying the sites College Fashionista and Spoon University, among others. In July 2024 Her Campus Media sold a stake to Soros Fund Management, the first outside investment in the company since it was founded fifteen years earlier. The size of the stake was not disclosed, and the company said its day-to-day operations would be unchanged.

== Personal life ==
Wang married Kenneth Fan in 2014.
