= Mound Laboratories =

Nuclear laboratory in Miamisburg, Ohio

Mound Laboratory
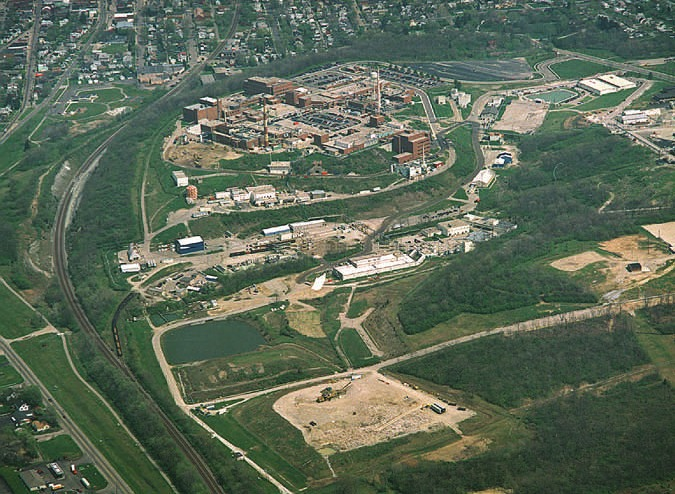
- Aerial view of Mound Laboratories
- Built: 1948
- Location: Miamisburg, Ohio
- Coordinates: 39.6291°N 84.2863°W

Mound Laboratory in Miamisburg, Ohio was an Atomic Energy Commission (later Department of Energy) facility for nuclear weapon research during the Cold War, named after the nearby Miamisburg Indian Mound.

The laboratory grew out of the World War II era Dayton Project (a site within the Manhattan Project) where the neutron generating triggers for the first plutonium bombs were developed.

Post-war construction of a permanent site for Dayton Project activities began in 1947. The lab was originally known as the Dayton Engineer Works. The lab began operations in 1948 and was managed by Monsanto. Mound produced detonators, cable assemblies, timers, firing sets, and other equipment. In 1954, Mound began working with tritium. The lab disassembled bomb components, recovering the tritium within and sending it for repurification at Savannah River Site. Mound supplied enriched non-radioactive isotopes. The lab also produced plutonium-238-powered thermoelectric heat sources called SNAP or Systems for Nuclear Auxiliary Power for the U.S. space program.

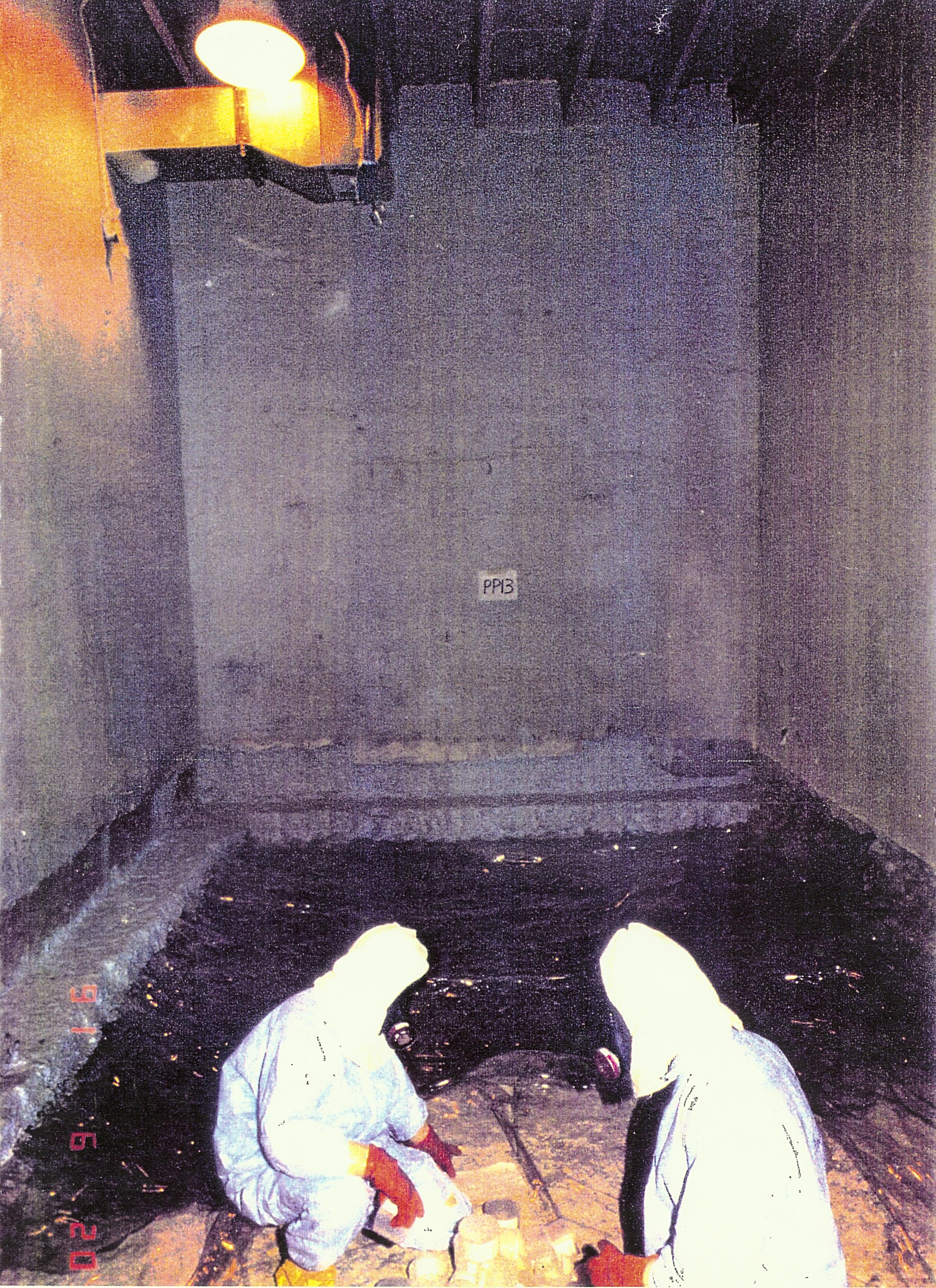
Demolition of the plutonium building at Mound Laboratory.

Workers at the site were represented by the Oil, Chemical and Atomic Workers International Union (OCAW).

Mound was declared a Superfund site and was put on the National Priorities list in 1989. In 2002, a decision was made to close the plant by 2006. Cleanup of the site began in 1995. Work with tritium ended in 1997. Cleanup of the site finished in 2010.

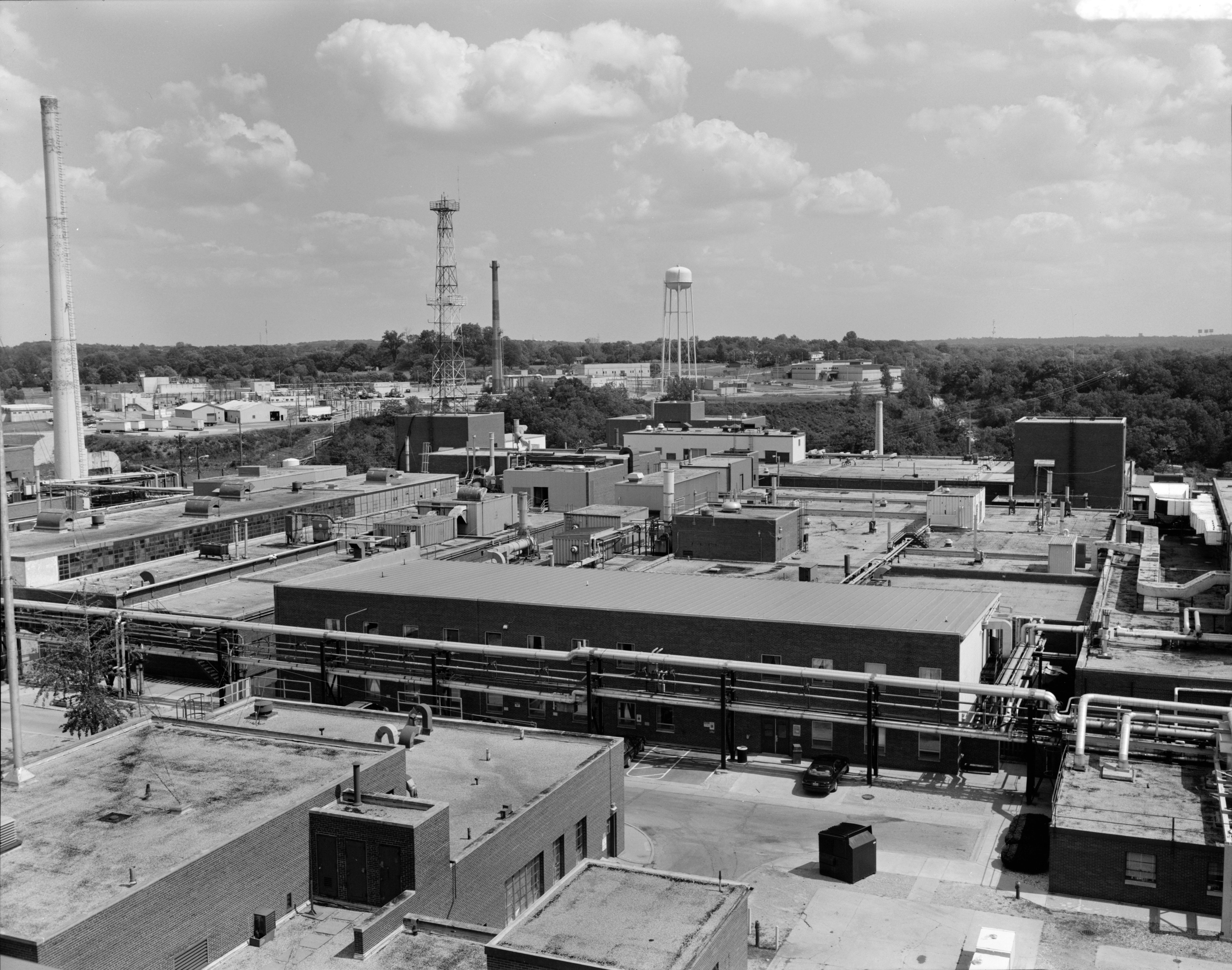
Building E at Mound Laboratory

== Sources ==
- Thomas B. Cochran, William M. Arkin, Robert S. Norris and Milton M. Hoenig of the National Resources Defense Council. Nuclear Weapons Databook Series Volume III: U.S. Nuclear Warhead Facility Profiles. 1987. pp. 59–61
- Radioactive Waste Management Associates on behalf of Alliance for Nuclear Accountability. Danger Lurks Below: The Threat to Major Water Supplies from US Department of Energy Nuclear Weapons Plants, Chapter 8: Mound Facility 2004.
