= Stephanie Kaplan =

Stephanie Kaplan Lewis (born December 5, 1988) is a co-founder, chief executive officer, and editor-in-chief of Her Campus, an online magazine targeted toward American college women. She regularly appears on the local FOX News affiliate in Boston to discuss college-related issues on behalf of Her Campus.

== Biography ==
Kaplan Lewis obtained her bachelor's degree in psychology with a minor in economics from Harvard University in 2010. During her college years, Kaplan Lewis served as the editor-in-chief of Freeze, Harvard's lifestyle and fashion online magazine. In 2009, Kaplan Lewis and two other Harvard undergraduates launched Her Campus.

Kaplan Lewis met fellow Harvard undergraduates Windsor Hanger Western and Annie Wang in fall 2007, while working on the staff of Freeze magazine. In January 2009, Kaplan Lewis, Hanger Western, and Wang entered Harvard's i3 Innovation Challenge business plan competition, which proposed a national online magazine for college women, with dedicated branches at colleges and universities across the United States. After receiving the Harvard Student Agencies Investment Award in the i3 Innovation Challenge in March 2009, the team moved forward and launched Her Campus.

Within her role as chief executive officer and editor-in-chief, Kaplan oversees content and expansion of the magazine to college branches. These partnerships allow Her Campus writers to share their articles with Seventeen magazine and The Huffington Post.

== Recognition ==
Kaplan Lewis was named to Inc. magazine's "30 Under 30 Coolest Young Entrepreneurs" for 2010^{[4]} and Glamour magazine's "20 Amazing Young Women". Kaplan Lewis, Hanger Western and Wang were all listed among the Boston Globe's "25 Most Stylish Bostonians of 2010". Kaplan Lewis was a 2016 EY Entrepreneurial Winning Woman. Kaplan Lewis, Hanger Western and Wang were named to the Forbes 30 under 30 in 2017 under Her Campus Media.

== Personal life ==
Kaplan Lewis married Jason Lewis in 2014. She currently lives in Newton, Massachusetts.
