= Oakwood, Montgomery County, Ohio =

Oakwood, Ohio
- City
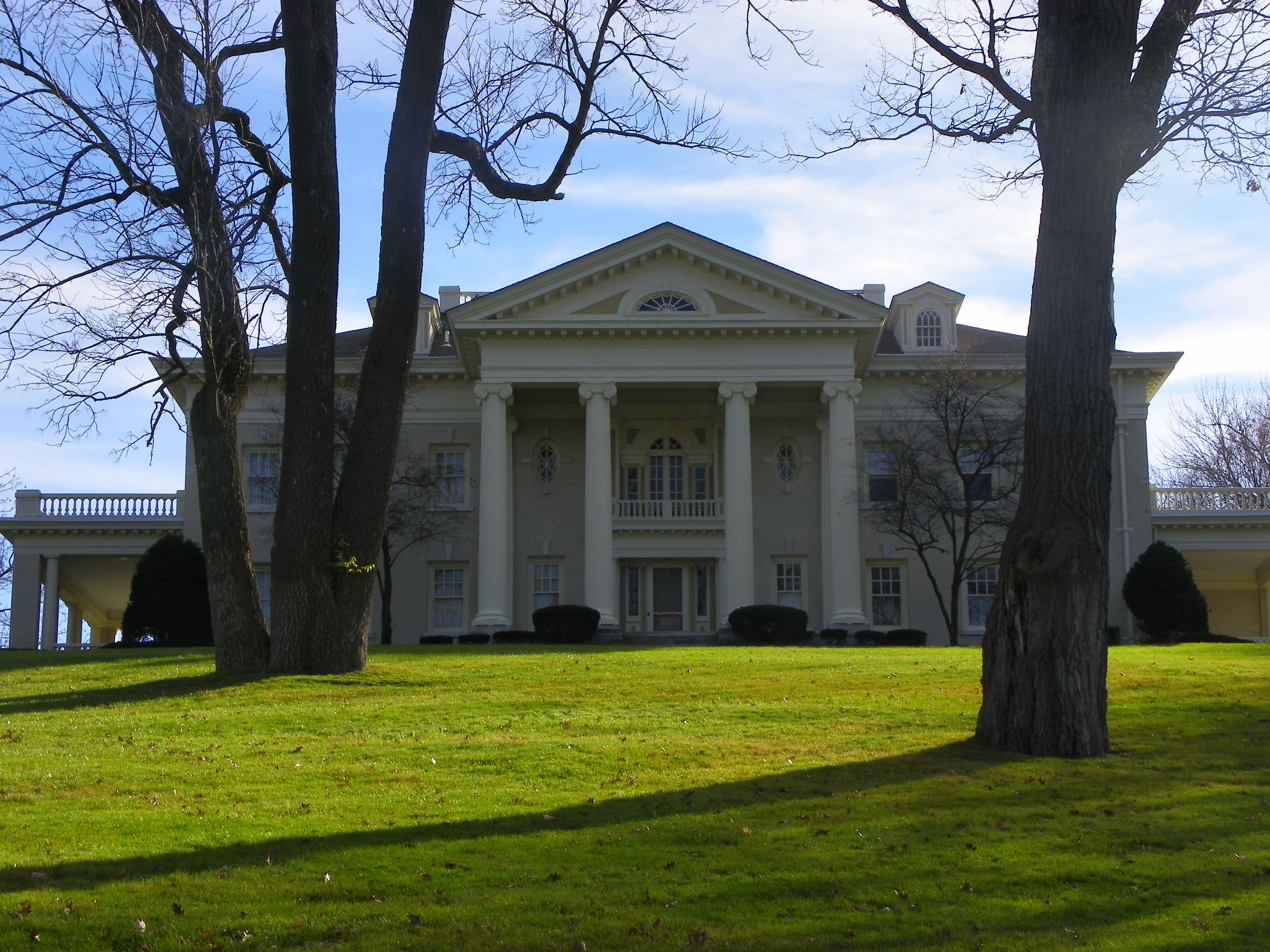
- Hawthorn Hill, home of Orville Wright

- Flag Seal
- Interactive map of Oakwood, Ohio
- Location within Ohio Location within the United States
- Coordinates: 39°43′13″N 84°10′24″W
- Country: United States
- State: Ohio
- County: Montgomery

Government
  - Mayor: William Duncan

Area
  - Total: 2.19 sq mi (5.68 km^{2})
  - Land: 2.19 sq mi (5.68 km^{2})
  - Water: 0 sq mi (0.00 km^{2})
- Elevation: 981 ft (299 m)

Population (2020)
  - Total: 9,572
  - Density: 4,361.6/sq mi (1,684.04/km^{2})
- Time zone: UTC−5 (Eastern (EST))
  - Summer (DST): UTC−4 (EDT)
- ZIP Codes: 45409, 45419
- Area codes: 937, 326
- FIPS code: 39-57764
- GNIS feature ID: 1086677
- Website: www.oakwoodohio.gov

Oakwood is a city in Montgomery County, Ohio, United States. The population was 9,572 at the 2020 census. A suburb of Dayton, Oakwood is part of the Dayton metropolitan area. It was incorporated in 1908. John Henry Patterson, industrialist and founder of the National Cash Register Corporation, is considered the "Father of Oakwood."

Oakwood is completely land-locked by the surrounding municipalities of Dayton and Kettering. Its small, compact geographic area facilitates the response of its single, unified (consolidated) Department of Public Safety, in which all personnel are certified as police officers, firefighters, and emergency medical services (EMS) officers.

== History ==
At the turn of the twentieth century, Oakwood was primarily farmland situated on a hill directly south of the City of Dayton. In 1913, when a disastrous flood devastated downtown Dayton (the Great Dayton Flood), advertising began to tout Oakwood property as "275 feet higher than the intersection of Third and Main Streets."

In light of this real estate advantage and its location adjacent to the City of Dayton, Oakwood's largest period of growth began and by 1930, the population numbered over 6,000. Oakwood incorporated as a city in 1908 and in 1932 adopted the Council/Manager form of government that is still in place.

One of the city's early residents was Orville Wright, whose home, Hawthorn Hill, still stands at the corner of Harman and Park Avenues. John H. Patterson, founder of the National Cash Register Company (NCR) also called Oakwood home. The city is known as a suburban residential area with mostly tree-lined streets.

During World War II, the Runnymede Playhouse in Oakwood hosted Unit IV of the Dayton Project. The Dayton Project was a little-known part of the Manhattan Project involved in creating industrial quantities of polonium for use in the neutron generating triggers of the first atomic weapon.

== Geography ==
It is within the Miami Valley region of southwestern Ohio, and borders on Dayton to its north and east and Kettering, Ohio to its south and west. The campus of the University of Dayton is directly adjacent to Oakwood on the northeast.

According to the United States Census Bureau, the city has a total area of 2.193 square miles (5.68 km^{2}), all land.

The city is unofficially divided into two parts, east and west, by the city's major road, State Route 48, also termed Far Hills Avenue. SR 48 runs north–south and connects the city of Dayton with Oakwood and, further south, with Kettering and other suburbs. The geography of the eastern and western sections differ to a significant extent, with the western side covered in prominent hills, while most of the eastern section is predominantly level or gently sloping.

=== Cityscape ===
Oakwood contains a rich collection of architecture. Because of the city's age, many of the houses were constructed before World War II and are older in design. Houses in Oakwood, which vary greatly in size, have styles which include Tudor, Swiss chalets, Colonial Revival, White Clapboard Colonial, and Gothic Revival. The western end of the city features many large properties and historic houses, such as Hawthorn Hill, home of Orville Wright. The houses in this area tend to lie on well secluded plots of land, surrounded by many trees.

Because of Oakwood's affluence, there is a general societal push for beautification. Run-down houses and unkempt lawns are generally frowned upon by the community; most lawns are well maintained. The city itself gives "Beautification Awards" to the judged most beautiful houses in order to maintain this high level of aesthetic awareness. The city has relatively strict zoning laws that restrict major changes to houses and require city approval for any planned structural additions. The city prohibits chain-link fences that can be seen from the street, and requires all external utility units (such as air conditioning units) to be obstructed from the view from the street.

Public architecture is a general source of pride for the Oakwood community. The city buildings were designed to incorporate the rich variation of traditional architectural styles found in the city's houses. Oakwood High School displays an elaborate external design. The elementary schools, Edwin D. Smith Elementary School and Harman Elementary School, echo this elaborate style. Smith Elementary is built in the Tudor style like the High School while Harman Elementary is Colonial revival. The newest addition to the school system, the Julian and Marjorie Lange School, features Spanish revival architecture. The Oakwood Board of Education occupies a gray stucco manse with red tile roof in the northernmost area of Oakwood on Rubicon Road. Wright Memorial Library offers similar aesthetics, and the police and fire department is reminiscent of a French château.

== Demographics ==
Historical population
Census	Pop.	Note	%±
1910	358		—
1920	1,473		311.5%
1930	6,494		340.9%
1940	7,652		17.8%
1950	9,691		26.6%
1960	10,493		8.3%
1970	10,095		−3.8%
1980	9,372		−7.2%
1990	8,957		−4.4%
2000	9,215		2.9%
2010	9,202		−0.1%
2020	9,572		4.0%
2025 (est.)	9,441		−1.4%

=== 2020 census ===
Oakwood racial composition
Race	Number	Percentage
White (NH)	8,019	83.8%
Black or African American (NH)	118	1.23%
Native American (NH)	8	0.08%
Asian (NH)	321	3.35%
Pacific Islander (NH)	3	0.03%
Other/mixed	739	7.72%
Hispanic or Latino	364	3.80%

=== 2010 census ===
As of the census of 2010, there were 9,202 people, 3,543 households, and 2,521 families residing in the city. The population density was 4,201.8 inhabitants per square mile (1,622.3/km^{2}). There were 3,772 housing units at an average density of 1,722.4 per square mile (665.0/km^{2}). The racial makeup of the city was 95.3% White, 0.9% African American, 0.2% Native American, 1.4% Asian, 0.6% from other races, and 1.6% from two or more races. Hispanic or Latino of any race were 1.8% of the population.

There were 3,543 households, of which 41.3% had children under the age of 18 living with them, 58.0% were married couples living together, 10.0% had a female householder with no husband present, 3.2% had a male householder with no wife present, and 28.8% were non-families. 26.1% of all households were made up of individuals, and 9.3% had someone living alone who was 65 years of age or older. The average household size was 2.58 and the average family size was 3.15.

The median age in the city was 40.5 years. 30.6% of residents were under the age of 18; 5.1% were between the ages of 18 and 24; 21.9% were from 25 to 44; 30.5% were from 45 to 64; and 11.9% were 65 years of age or older. The gender makeup of the city was 47.4% male and 52.6% female.

The median income for a household in the city was $94,731 and the median income for a family was $116,719. The per capita income for the city was $50,258. 70.6% of Oakwood's residents have earned a bachelor's degree or higher.

=== 2000 census ===
As of the census of 2000, there were 9,215 people, 3,633 households, and 2,597 families residing in the city. The population density was 4,209.0 inhabitants per square mile (1,625.1/km^{2}). There were 3,815 housing units at an average density of 1,742.5 per square mile (672.8/km^{2}). The racial makeup of the city was 97.41% White, 0.48% African American, 0.07% Native American, 0.98% Asian, 0.03% Pacific Islander, 0.29% from other races, and 0.75% from two or more races. Hispanic or Latino of any race were 1.20% of the population.

There were 3,633 households, out of which 38.2% had children under the age of 18 living with them, 61.8% were married couples living together, 8.0% had a female householder with no husband present, and 28.5% were non-families. 26.3% of all households were made up of individuals, and 11.1% had someone living alone who was 65 years of age or older. The average household size was 2.53 and the average family size was 3.08.

In the city the population was spread out, with 29.1% under the age of 18, 4.2% from 18 to 24, 27.1% from 25 to 44, 25.8% from 45 to 64, and 13.8% who were 65 years of age or older. The median age was 39 years. For every 100 females, there were 89.0 males. For every 100 females age 18 and over, there were 85.3 males.

The median income for a household in the city was $72,392, and the median income for a family was $88,263. Males had a median income of $70,500 versus $35,833 for females. The per capita income for the city was $41,567. About 1.7% of families and 3.3% of the population were below the poverty line, including 2.7% of those under age 18 and 2.6% of those age 65 or over.

== Education ==
The Lange School is the Oakwood City School District's kindergarten building. Until The Lange School opened in 1999, kindergartens were in each elementary school. The Harman Elementary School and Edwin D. Smith Elementary School provide service to children from first through sixth grades.

One contiguous junior and senior high school provides education for all Oakwood students grades seven through twelve. Oakwood High School graduated its first senior class in 1924 and began the practice of the Baccalaureate ceremony at Westminster Presbyterian Church in downtown Dayton. The end of an Oakwood student's experience is the Senior Awards, Baccalaureate, and Commencement ceremonies. Oakwood High School's yearbook is The Acorn, and its newspaper is The Dome.

Oakwood's educational system places a strong emphasis on post-secondary education. Oakwood High School is a national school of excellence. During the 2016–17 school year, Oakwood High School earned the highest performance index on state tests of any high school in the state. OHS’ index score was 92.0 on a 100-point scale, with no other high school in Ohio above 90. Oakwood High School's English, mathematics, natural science, and foreign language courses are matched by many performing arts opportunities for its students. It is not uncommon for Oakwood's top academic graduates to gain acceptance to some of the most selective universities and colleges in the United States and the world. Most graduates, however, attend schools within a 300-mile radius, with a large percentage remaining in Ohio. Oakwood High School is consistently ranked as one of the top 10 academic institutes in Ohio as well as one of the top 400 in the United States.

== Infrastructure ==
Oakwood is noteworthy for having traditionally hosted route 5 of Dayton's historic trolleybus network, which is the second oldest of only four trolleybus networks still operating in the US, along with those of San Francisco, Seattle, and Philadelphia. In 2023, Greater Dayton Regional Transit Authority (GDRTA) deemed their trolley system obsolete, citing maintenance costs and investment in alternative technology. The trolley lines along Far Hills Avenue through Oakwood and Kettering had not been in use since 2016 despite being along major GDRTA routes service the southern suburbs of Dayton. In 2024, GDRTA, the City of Oakwood, and the city of Kettering partnered to remove the trolley infrastructure along Far Hills Avenue by 2025.

== Sister cities ==
- Le Vésinet, France
- Outremont, Quebec, Canada
- Unterhaching, Germany (friendship pact)

== See also ==
- Oakwood, Cuyahoga County, Ohio
- Oakwood, Paulding County, Ohio
