= City of Glass (Coupland book) =

Book by Douglas Coupland

- Author: Douglas Coupland
- Language: English
- Publisher: Douglas and McIntyre
- Publication date: 2000
- Publication place: Canada
- Media type: Print
- Followed by: Souvenir of Canada

City of Glass is a book by Canadian author Douglas Coupland, published by Douglas and McIntyre in 2000, featuring short essays and photographs of his home town of Vancouver, British Columbia. Each essay deals with a different aspect of the city, such as the glass condominium towers which dominate the Vancouver skyline and give the book its title. It also includes the short story "My Hotel Year", which first appeared in Coupland's Life After God (1994), and the essay on another Vancouver landmark, Lions' Gate Bridge, which was published in Polaroids from the Dead (1996). An updated version of the text was released in 2009.

Canadian-born artist Una Knox produced the majority of photographic images for this book.

== Titles of the Essays ==
The book is broken down into essays, titled with bold section headings. The essays are alphabetical, with a few artistic insertions and juxtapositions.

The essays are:

abc… Backlot North BC Ferries Beads & Granola Bellingham & the Border The Big One Birds Cantonese Chinatown Couples Colours Dim Sum England's Dreaming The Everycity Expo 86 Feng Shui Fleece Greenpeace	The Grouse Grind Grouse Mountain Grow-ops The Harbour Hemp History … or lack thereof Japanese Slackers My Hotel Year (a story from Life After God) Kits Love Boats Main & Hastings Monster Houses Mt. Baker Number 8 Post & Beam Real Estate! The Rest of Canada	Salmon Lions Gate (an essay from Polaroids from the Dead) Seattle See-Throughs SkyTrain Stanley Park Stó:lõ Sushi Trees Vansterdam Victoria Weather The West End Whales Whistler Wildlife Wreck Beach YVR

== Inspiration ==
The book jacket’s text describes Coupland’s influence and motivation to write this book.

I get lots of visitors every year, and they always seem to ask the same questions about Vancouver ... "Why is the number 8 everywhere?" "What’s the deal with pot?" "And what, exactly, is the deal with BC Ferries?" And so on. People want to know what Vancouver feels like to somebody who lives here – from the inside out. So this book arises from both love and laziness: love, because I spent my twenties scouring the globe thinking there had to be a better city out there, until it dawned on me that Vancouver is the best one going; and laziness, because I thought I was going to go mental explaining dim sum, the sulphur pits and Kitsilano for the umpteen-hundredth time.

— Coupland on his inspiration in writing the book
