= Extraordinary Canadians: Marshall McLuhan =

Book by Douglas Coupland

- Author: Douglas Coupland
- Language: English
- Genre: Biography
- Publisher: Penguin
- Publication date: 2009
- Publication place: Canada
- Media type: Print (Hardcover)
- Pages: 251 pp
- Preceded by: Generation A

Marshall McLuhan is a biography written by Canadian author Douglas Coupland as a part of Penguin Canada's Extraordinary Canadians series. It was published in March 2011 in the US by Atlas & Company under the title, "Marshall McLuhan: You Know Nothing of my Work!". The American edition omits the preface describing the Extraordinary Canadians series by John Ralston Saul.

== Style ==
This biography uses many stylistic writing techniques to make both Marshall McLuhan and his ideas relatable to the reader of this biography. The biography follows McLuhan's life from his youth in Winnipeg, through his schooling at Cambridge, and to his founding of the Media Studies program at the University of Toronto. The biography features prominent sections in which the author reflects on how his life and his ideas relate to Marshall McLuhan. From old family connections, to influences of his later works like Generation A, Coupland creates a narrative tale that follows the biographical narrative in which Coupland explores the implications on his life and the world in general that stems from McLuhan's ideas.

Coupland also uses the second person in some sections of the biography, creating an immediacy between the reader and the author that also heightens the relatability of McLuhan's life and his ideas.

The biographical movements are also framed in current technology; the section titles are different keyboard commands, such as "... return" and "... command ... shift". The functions of the keyboard commands relate to the changes happening in McLuhan's biographical narrative.

The novel features some Coupland staples, such as the long lists of repeating, yet changing, words, and vignette-like personal stories which are similar to those found in his other non-fiction works, such as Souvenir of Canada.

Other interesting inserts are the current auction prices for copies of McLuhan's books, as well as many quotes from or about McLuhan. There are also MapQuest derived directions of different places and travels that McLuhan made, which creates a modern relatability of the distances and locations in the biography.

== Themes ==
This biography has many themes. As noted by Coupland, there are other biographies of McLuhan which delve into more personal details, such as the stories of his children and wife. This biography is mostly focused on McLuhan as a man, and the ideas that man created. The biography follows the genesis of his ideas from conception to production to reception, and their effect on him as a person, and how they have shaped the perceptions of the world since.

=== Autism ===
Coupland focuses in this novel on the idea that McLuhan exhibited many signs today recognized as falling somewhere on the autism spectrum. He includes Simon Baron-Cohen's autism-spectrum quotient quiz, and discusses how McLuhan's actions may have been signs of this condition.

Michael McLuhan, executor of the McLuhan estate, criticized Coupland's suggestions of autism. "These ridiculously absurd speculations completely mar what would have been an interesting and unique biographical approach," he said, adding that the biographies by Terrance Gordon and Philip Marchand are superior. Speaking on behalf of all the McLuhan children, he also said their father "was not disabled or challenged in any way. He was not autistic...As his children, we can assure you he had no issues with being touched."

However, Coupland does not state that McLuhan was autistic, but uses McLuhan's actions as a point of relation between himself and his subject. Autism has been a theme in other books by Coupland, himself autistic, such as JPod.

=== Technology ===
The biography also takes a technological approach to the works of Marshall McLuhan, and how his ideas have become even more important with the rise of the Internet.

... you can rest assured he was right on the money four decades ahead of the biggest shift in human communication since the printing press.

— Douglas Coupland

As Coupland has written about the effects of technology in previous works like Microserfs and JPod, he discusses the relations between modern technology and McLuhan's ideas in the modern context, with subject matter like Wikipedia and YouTube.
