= Life After God =

Short story collection by Douglas Coupland

- Author: Douglas Coupland
- Language: English
- Publisher: Pocket Books
- Publication date: March 1994
- Publication place: Canada
- Media type: Print (hardcover & paperback)
- Pages: 360
- ISBN: 0-671-87433-0 (hardcover)
- OCLC: 29256833
- Dewey Decimal: 813/.54 20
- LC Class: PS3553.O855 L54 1994
- Preceded by: Shampoo Planet
- Followed by: Microserfs

Life After God is a collection of short stories by Douglas Coupland, published in 1994. The stories are set around a theme of a generation raised without religion. The jacket for the hardcover book reads "You are the first generation to be raised without religion." The text is an exploration of faith in this vacuum of religion. The stories are also illustrated by the author. Several critics have suggested that this publication marks an early shift in the stylistic vocabulary of Coupland and, according to one critic, he was "excoriated presumably for attempting be serious and to express depression and spiritual yearning when his reviewers were expecting more postmodern jollity". However, the short story would later come to garner more praise (see below) though critics and academics have paid little attention to the publication in terms of academics' articles and commentary.

== Stories ==
These are the stories that appear in the book, in the order of appearance: (Note: All stories are told in the first person)

=== Little Creatures ===
This initial story chronicles a somewhat gloomy road trip a father takes with his child in order to pay a visit to the child's grandfather in Prince George, British Columbia. A contemplation of life's adversities and a pending divorce, the short story features the two characters’ parallel narratives of development in which both father and the child are at frail and liminal points in their lives. Thematically, the story touches upon the almost classic theme of an adult prematurely exposing a child to the harsh realities of life – in this story being alcoholism and the bitterness of a divorce, as one critic has noted.

=== My Hotel Year ===
This story is told in two parts. The story is told by a lonely person living in a hotel, and his interactions with some of the others that live in the hotel. In the first part, Cathy, the narrator analyzes his relationship with his neighbours, Cathy and Pup-Tent, as well as his relationship to Cathy. The second part, Donny, tells the tale of the narrator's relationship with Donny, a hustler, who lives a very dangerous lifestyle. A frequent stabbing victim, Donny lives for the thrill of the dangerous lifestyle. He does not seem to care about his well-being, but still values his life.

=== Things That Fly ===
The narrator of this story is a lonely man, who pays a visit to his parents’ house. While there, he finds himself watching television. He sees a report about how they are planning to kill off Superman. This news leaves the narrator heartbroken. The narrator contemplates the ability to fly and what it will mean if the one truly good person in the world is gone.

=== The Wrong Sun ===
Another story told in two parts. The first part, Thinking of the Sun, is apocalyptic. Nuclear episodes and war cause a cataclysm that ends the world. These episodes are the only non-fiction in the book and come from Coupland's own life. Flashes of light replace the sun, and those who are alive to see it are reminded of their delicate existence. The second part, The Dead Speak, is a collective letter from those who died in this nuclear war. It gives revelations of their last moments on earth. It also relays the message that the living should move on, as the dead are in a new place and have changed souls.

=== Gettysburg ===
A letter from a father to a daughter, this story is a tale of the father's love. The father tells the daughter about his honeymoon, her conception, and he contemplates on the major life changes taking place in his life. It is a story about love in the religious vacuum.

=== In The Desert ===
Dedicated to Michael Stipe from R.E.M., this is the story of the narrator's trip through the desert. He is alone, but not lonely, even on his birthday. The narrator has experienced the deepest depth of loneliness. He stole syringes and steroids, to deliver to a celebrity trainer. The story is a road story, told as the character travels down Interstate 15, and the journey does not quite go as planned. A chance encounter with a desert man changes his outlook on life.

=== Patty Hearst ===
The female narrator of this story wonders about her life and the sequence of events that make it up. She first tells a story of a dog that died of a broken heart after its owner's death. The story itself follows the narrator's trip to possibly find her sister, Laurie, who ran away from home while the main narrator was still young. Laurie had become a drug addict. She explores the feeling of loneliness throughout the tales.

=== 1,000 Years (Life After God) ===
1,000 Years is the tale of a group of childhood friends. It is the longest story in the book. It is narrated by a character named Scout. The story illustrates where each character's life takes them, and their individual searches for meaning. Scout moves away from society, and into the wilderness. He is searching for meaning, or religion, or a connection to God. One researcher has noted that the characters in this story hold "a tacit resentment against the parent generation for" the neglect of not having instilled in them a measure of faith and that this "story in particular, can be read as thematizing the young generation's quest for an alternative narrative of faith."

== Inspiration ==
After Shampoo Planet, Coupland began to look for a low tech topic for his next novel. He began to study the Great Famine of Ireland of 1845–1847. While researching this, short stories "started popping out of [him]". Coupland's religious life as a child was non-existent. He was raised as a blank slate, with no religious influence from his parents. He did not celebrate religious holidays such as Christmas or Easter.

"For me there was nothing—not even the seed of a religious experience to grow from—and I found that I had to build (and continue to) try and build some sort of faith for myself using the components taken from disposable West Coast suburban culture. Malls and nature and fast-food places."

— Coupland, USA Today, 1994.

Life After God is one expression of this pursuit.

== History of the novel ==
While researching the Great Famine, Coupland crafted multiple short stories, complete with images drawn by the author. He then took these short stories, and bound them into individual small books at a copy center. Coupland then gave them out as presents to friends. They were not initially meant to form a complete novel. "I had no idea they'd become a book-book until near the end" (USA Today, 1994).

The original book jacket for the hard cover carried the message "You are the first generation to be raised without religion." It also carried the message "Please remove cover jacket flap before reading". This is because Coupland found the original cover to be a distraction from the text itself: "So the book won't be judged by its cover, and so readers will be aware that they are holding this oddly retro little zero-tech paper-and-word object called a book." (USA Today, 1994). As well, the story "In the Desert" is dedicated to Michael Stipe from R.E.M.

The book was initially met with very mixed reviews. Most critics compared the book to Generation X and Shampoo Planet and found that it was not in the same vein; Coupland's first two novels defined generations, while Life After God was much more introspective. This left critics wanting. Others saw the text's departure from the earlier work a virtue, and praised the text for being "sincere" instead of purely "ironic". Generally, the text was received by critics very negatively.

Throughout the life of the book, however, the popularity of the text has dramatically increased in both respectability and popularity. In reviews for texts such as Hey Nostradamus! and Eleanor Rigby, the text has been referenced as one of the best of Coupland's career. The book has also had an effect in other creative fields. The Ataris have recorded a song based upon "My Hotel Year" with lyrics directly from the story. The anime Ergo Proxy has also named the 18th episode after the title of the text. The book also enjoys a life in the academic world. It has been taught at major universities, such as Simon Fraser University. It has also been written upon in the academic study of Coupland's work, "Contemporary American and Canadian Novelists: Douglas Coupland" by Andrew Tate from Manchester University.

== Criticism ==
- Jensen, Mikkel, "A Drinking Problem Just Like Grandpa’s", in Academic Quarter, no. 4, 2012: 180–191. Link: http://www.akademiskkvarter.hum.aau.dk/pdf/vol4/Jensen_M_Drinking.pdf
- Sørensen, Bent, "Youth and Innocence as Textual Constructs in the Short Stories of J.D. Salinger and Douglas Coupland", OASIS, no. 62, 2004, Odense: SDU Press.
- Geddes, Dan, "Douglas Coupland’s Life After God: A Case of Style Over Substance", The Satirist June, 1999 Link: http://www.thesatirist.com/books/life_after_god.html

== Editions ==
- ISBN 0-671-87433-0 (1994, hardcover)
- ISBN 0-671-71904-1 (1994, UK hardcover)
- ISBN 0-671-87434-9 (1995, paperback)
- ISBN 0-684-86021-X (1999, UK paperback)
- ISBN 0-7432-3151-1 (2002, trade paperback)
- ISBN 0-671-88715-7 (audiobook)
