= Generation A =

Generation A may refer to:

- Generation Alpha, a demographic cohort born between the early 2010s and the 2020s
- Generation A (book), a 2009 book by Douglas Coupland
- "Generation A", a song by Arcade Fire
