= Douglas Coupland =

Canadian writer and graphic designer (born 1961)

Douglas Coupland OC OBC RCA
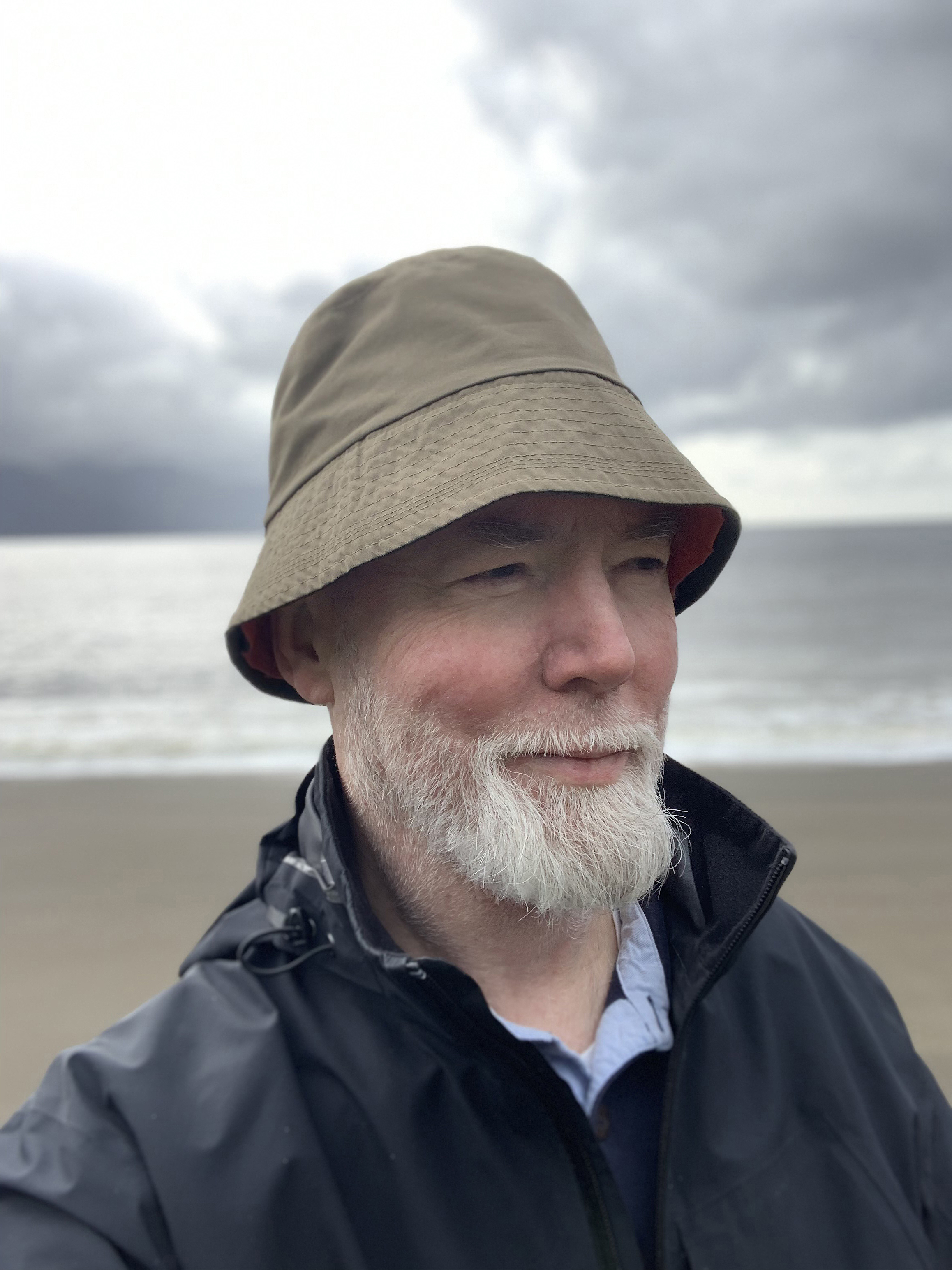
- Coupland in Haida Gwaii (2022)
- Born: December 30, 1961 (age 64); RCAF Station Baden–Soellingen, West Germany
- Occupations: Writer; artist
- Writing career
- Notable works: Generation X (1991); Microserfs (1995); JPod (2006)
- Movements: Postmodernism; modernism
- Douglas Coupland's voice from the BBC programme Bookclub, 7 March 2010
- Website: coupland.com

Douglas Coupland (Note: Pronounced /ˈkoʊplənd/ KOHP-lənd) OC OBC RCA (born 30 December 1961) is a Canadian visual artist and writer. Trained originally as a sculptor, Coupland found unexpected success as a novelist with the publication of his 1991 international bestseller Generation X: Tales for an Accelerated Culture, which popularized the terms Generation X and McJob. He has since gone on to publish dozens of books, including novels, short story collections, and essay collections. He has also worked as a columnist and contributor for a number of periodicals, including the New York Times, the Financial Times, The Guardian, and Wired Magazine.

Coupland has maintained a prolific visual art practice in parallel to his literary career, with the former eventually becoming his main focus. Primarily a mixture of sculpture and painting, his art–like his writing–has explored a variety of interests, including 20th-century pop culture, the relationship between technology and society, environmental pollution, spirituality, ecology, and the nature of Canadian national identity. Coupland’s art has been the subject of numerous exhibitions in galleries and museums around the world: His first major retrospective, Everywhere Is Anywhere Is Anything Is Everything, was shown in Vancouver and Toronto from 2014 to 2015, while his first major solo exhibition in Europe, Bit Rot, was shown at Rotterdam's Kunstinstituut Melly as well as Munich’s Villa Stuck between 2015 and 2017. Coupland has also created numerous public art installations which have been integrated into Canada’s urban landscape. Some of his most famous works in this regard include his Digital Orca in Vancouver; as well as the various pieces created for Toronto’s Canoe Landing Park.

Coupland is an Officer of the Order of Canada, a member of the Royal Canadian Academy of Arts, a member of the Order of British Columbia, and a member of France's Ordre des Arts et des Lettres. Coupland has been long-listed twice for the Scotiabank Giller Prize in 2006 and 2010, was a finalist for the Writers' Trust Fiction Prize in 2009, and was nominated for the Hubert Evans Non-Fiction Prize in 2011 for his Extraordinary Canadians: Marshall McLuhan.

== Early life ==
Coupland was born on December 30, 1961, at RCAF Station Baden-Soellingen in West Germany, the second of four sons of Douglas Charles Thomas Coupland, a medical officer in the Royal Canadian Air Force, and C. Janet Coupland, a graduate in comparative religion from McGill University. In 1965, the Coupland family moved to West Vancouver, where Coupland's father opened a private family medical practice at the completion of his military tour.

French's Mustard with Strawberry Sauce (2023) part of his New Ice Age series.

Coupland describes his upbringing as producing a "blank slate". "My mother comes from a sour-faced family of preachers who from the 19th century to well into the 20th scoured the prairies thumping Bibles. Her parents tried to get away from that but unwittingly transmitted their values to my mother. My father's family weren't that different."

Graduating from Sentinel Secondary School in West Vancouver in 1979, Coupland went to McGill University with the intention of (like his father) studying the sciences, specifically physics. Coupland left McGill at the year's end and returned to Vancouver to attend art school.

At the Emily Carr College of Art and Design on Granville Island in Vancouver, in Coupland's words, "I ... had the best four years of my life. It's the one place I've felt truly, totally at home. It was a magic era between the hippies and the PC goon squads. Everyone talked to everyone and you could ask anybody anything." While there, Coupland formed lasting friendships with fellow students Angela Grossman, Attila Richard Lukacs, Derek Root, and Graham Gilmore, each of whom would go on to find their own recognition as artists.

Coupland graduated from Emily Carr in 1984 with a focus on sculpture, and moved on to study at the Hokkaido College of Art & Design in Sapporo, Japan and the Istituto Europeo di Design (European Design Institute) in Milan, Italy. He also completed courses in business science, fine art, and industrial design in Japan in 1986.

Coupland at the Emily Carr College of Art and Design in 1982.

Established as a designer and researcher working for Magazine House in Tokyo, Coupland developed a painful skin condition brought on by Tokyo's summer climate; he reluctantly returned to Vancouver. Whilst still living in Japan, Coupland had been sending postcards to his friend back home. A mutual friend, the editor and journalist Malcolm Parry, happened to read one of Coupland’s postcards and, impressed by his writing ability, offered him a job at Vancouver Magazine, where Parry was then editor-in-chief. Following the success of Coupland’s first assignment, in which he reported on an art scandal involving Los Angeles gallerist Doug Christmas, the novice writer was given a regular monthly feature at the magazine. (The fourth of these feature articles would contain Coupland’s first ruminations on the generational malaise explored in his debut novel.)

Coupland had begun writing professionally as a means of paying his art studio bills, and it was during this same period that he mounted his first art exhibition. Called Floating World, the exhibition comprised a series of representational sculptures depicting oversized everyday objects. Floating World was hosted at the Vancouver Art Gallery from November 20, 1987 to January 28, 1988. Then 26 years old, Coupland was at that time one of the youngest artists to have received an exhibition at the VAG.

In 1988, Malcolm Parry (Coupland’s boss and mentor at Vancouver Magazine) was hired as editor of the newly launched–and ultimately short-lived–Vista Magazine in Toronto, and he brought Coupland along with him. While working for Vista, Coupland wrote a monthly comic strip, “Generation X,” which picked up on ideas he had first examined in an earlier feature article for Vancouver Magazine. Illustrated by cartoonist Paul Rivoche, the strip “told the story of young office workers, struggling to survive in a competitive office environment, where smug baby boomers had all the best jobs, and all the complacent attitude.” The strip attracted the notice of St. Martin’s, a New York-based publishing house, who advanced Coupland the sum of $USD22,500 to write a book based on the strip. Thus began Coupland’s long, prolific, and indeed unexpected, literary career.

== Literary works ==
=== Generation X (1991) ===
From 1989 to 1990, Coupland lived in the Mojave Desert working on a handbook about the birth cohort that followed the baby boom. He had received a $22,500 advance from St. Martin's Press to write the nonfiction handbook. Instead, Coupland wrote the novel Generation X: Tales for an Accelerated Culture. It was rejected in Canada before being accepted by an American publishing house in 1991. Reflecting on the writing of his debut novel years later, Coupland said, "I remember spending my days almost dizzy with loneliness and feeling like I'd sold the family cow for three beans. I suppose it was this crippling loneliness that gave Gen X its bite. I was trying to imagine a life for myself on paper that certainly wasn't happening in reality."

Coupland pictured in Palm Springs, CA 1990.

Not an instant success, the novel steadily increased in sales; eventually, the book attracted a following behind its core idea of "Generation X". Over his own protestations, Coupland was dubbed the spokesperson for a generation, stating in 2006 "I was just doing what I do and people sort of stuck that on to me. It's not like I spend my days thinking that way." The terms Generation X and McJob, used by Coupland in the novel, ultimately entered the vernacular. Coupland described Gen X as those born in the late 1950s and early 1960s, which ironically are often considered younger baby boomer (Generation Jones) years. In 1999, he described his book as being about "the fringe of Generation Jones which became the mainstream of Generation X."

=== Shampoo Planet (1992) ===
Shampoo Planet was published by Pocket Books in 1992. It focused on the generation after Coupland's, the group called "Global Teens" in his first novel. Coupland defined Global Teens as those born in the mid-late 1960s and 1970s; ironically, this group later came to be known as Generation X in the media. Coupland permanently moved back to Vancouver soon after the novel was published. He had spent his "twenties scouring the globe thinking there had to be a better city out there, until it dawned on [him] that Vancouver is the best one going".

=== Life After God (1994) ===
Coupland had written a collection of small books, which together were compiled, after the advice of his publisher, into the book Life After God. This collection of short stories, with its focus on spirituality, initially provoked polarized reaction before eventually revealing itself as a bellwether text for the avant-garde sensibility identified by Ferdinand Mount as "Christian post-Christian".

Coupland pictured in Legoland Billund, Denmark, 1994.

=== Microserfs (1995) ===
In 1994, Coupland was working for the newly formed magazine Wired. While there, he wrote a short story about the life of the employees at Microsoft Corporation. This short work provided the inspiration for a novel, Microserfs. To research the culture that the novel depicted, Coupland had moved to Palo Alto, California and immersed himself in Silicon Valley life. Microserfs was published in 1995.

=== Polaroids from the Dead (1996) ===
Coupland followed Microserfs with his first collection of non-fiction pieces in 1996. Polaroids from the Dead is a manifold of stories and essays on diverse topics, including: Grateful Dead concerts; Harolding; Kurt Cobain's death; the visiting of a German reporter; and a comprehensive essay on Brentwood, California, written at the time of the O. J. Simpson murder case and the anniversary of Marilyn Monroe's death.

=== Girlfriend in a Coma (1998) ===
Also in 1996, Coupland was touring Europe to promote Microserfs. However, the high workload brought on fatigue and mental strain. He reportedly incorporated his experience with depression during this period into his novel, Girlfriend in a Coma. Coupland noted that this was his last novel to be "... written as a young person, the last constructed from notebooks full of intricate observations". Girlfriend in a Coma was published in 1998. That same year, Coupland contributed the short story "Fire at the Ativan Factory" to the collection Disco 2000; he also wrote the liner notes for Saint Etienne's album Good Humor.

=== Miss Wyoming (2000) ===
In 2000, Coupland published the novel Miss Wyoming. A love story revolving around an ex-beauty queen/soap opera star and an ageing B-movie producer, Miss Wyoming was described as “his weirdest, most wonderful book so far,” with one reviewer remarking that “Coupland’s gift is to make you care about people who, in other people’s novels, would be incidental Aunt Sallys, people to blame or ridicule.”

=== City of Glass (2000) ===
Coupland then published his photographic paean to Vancouver, City of Glass. The book incorporates sections from Life After God and Polaroids from the Dead into a visual narrative, formed from photographs of the city and its culture, supplemented by regional art photographers plus archival news imagery.

=== God Hates Japan (2001) ===
In 2000, Coupland collaborated with Vancouver animator Mike Howatson to produce God Hates Japan, an illustrated novel which was released in 2001. Published only in Japanese, the novel follows the life of a mid-twenties Tokyoite trying to find meaning amid the societal anomie of post-bubble, turn-of-the-century Japan. While Coupland wrote the text, Howatson drew the illustrations.

=== All Families are Psychotic (2001) ===
Coupland's 2001 novel All Families Are Psychotic tells the story of a dysfunctional family from Vancouver coming together to watch their daughter Sarah, an astronaut, launch into space. Coupland began the promotional rounds for the book in New York City, only a few days before the September 11 attacks took place. Years later, in his 2004 one-man play September 10 performed at Stratford-upon-Avon, Coupland would reflect that these were the last days of the 1990s, and the new century had now truly begun.

=== Souvenir of Canada (2002) ===
On July 1 (Canada Day) of 2002, Coupland’s non-fiction book Souvenir of Canada was published–the first in what would be a two-volume series. The book has a format similar to City of Glass, utilizing a mixture of essays and photographs in order to delineate the contours of Canadian national identity. Writing about uniquely Canadian things like the Trans-Canada Highway, Kraft Macaroni and Cheese, and cigarette warning labels, Coupland explored everyday objects and shared cultural references to create a new vernacular language of national identity.

=== School Spirit (2002) ===
In 2002 France’s Editions Disvoir published School Spirit, the result of a collaboration between Coupland and French artist Pierre Huyghe. A mixture of text and images, the book was created from thousands of archival photographs clipped out of Coupland’s extensive collection of high school yearbooks. Huyghe assembled the selected images, while Coupland wrote the first-person narrative which runs through the book, which is told from the point-of-view of a deceased 16-year old whose ghost inhabits a fictional California high school. School Spirit was released in two versions, one in French and one in English. Describing it as “gleefully morbid,” one reviewer wrote that the book “is sure to provoke rueful recognition in anyone who has ever been a teenager, although it is written ostensibly by, and surely for, those who don’t altogether survive the experience.”

=== Hey Nostradamus! (2003) ===
Coupland continued his exploration of alienated adolescence with his 2003 novel Hey Nostradamus!, which describes a fictitious high school shooting similar to the 1999 Columbine High School massacre. Coupland relocates the events to a school in North Vancouver, Canada. Along with Life After God, Hey Nostradamus! also evinces Coupland's long-standing fascination with the fracture lines between the secular and religious worlds.

=== Eleanor Rigby (2004) ===
Coupland followed Hey Nostradamus! with Eleanor Rigby. As with the eponymous song by The Beatles, the novel examines loneliness through its sympathetic portrait of a lonely, unprepossessing middle-aged woman. The novel received some positive acclaim as a more mature work, a notable example being novelist Ali Smith who, in her review of the book for The Guardian, called it a "pivotal novel for Coupland."

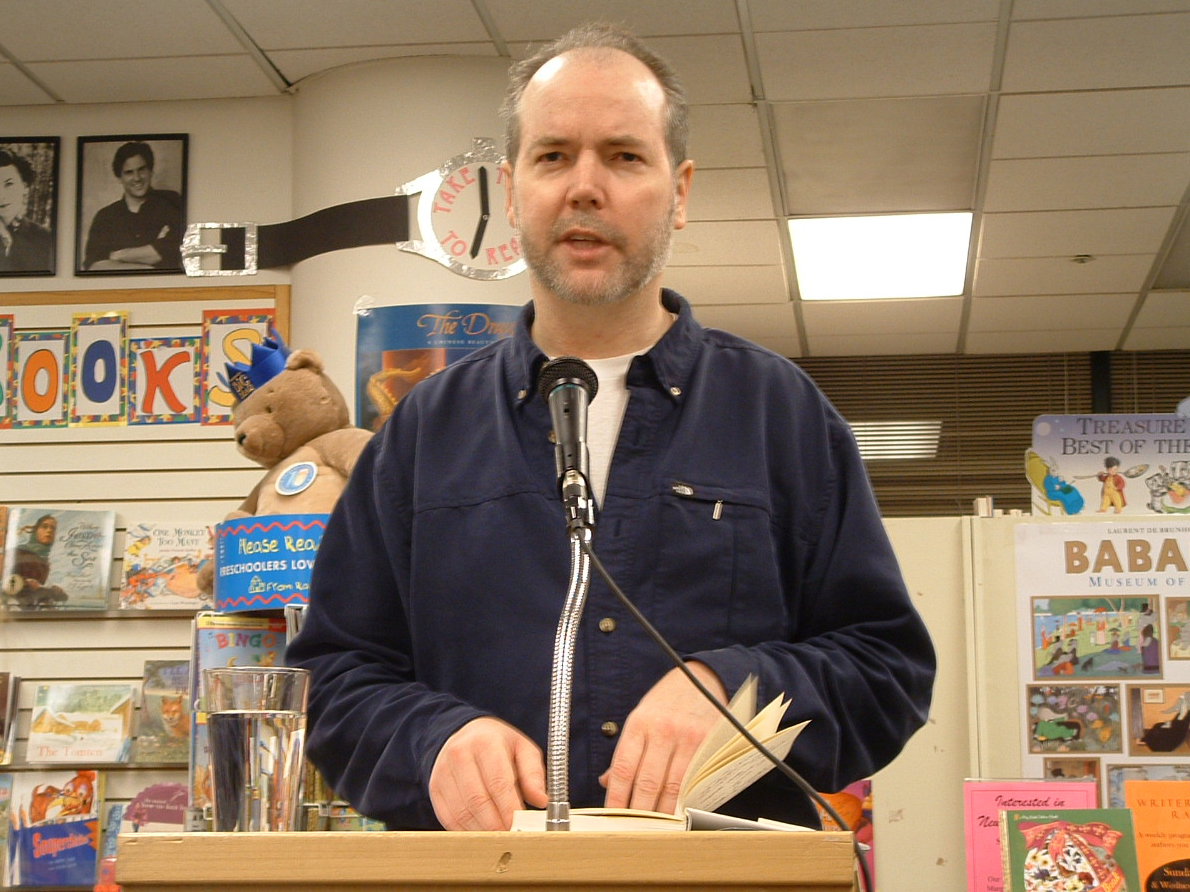
Coupland reading Eleanor Rigby at A Clean Well-Lighted Place for Books in San Francisco, 2005.

=== Souvenir of Canada II (2004) ===
On July 1, 2004, Coupland released the second installment of his two-volume Souvenir in Canada series. As with the first book, Souvenir of Canada II is an idiosyncratic exploration of Canadian identity through reference to Canadian products, cultural references, and Coupland’s personal memories, employing both text and images. Whereas the first Souvenir of Canada featured a series of still life photographs, the second contains photographs of Canada House, a temporary art installation Coupland had created inside a condemned suburban home in 2003 (see Art Exhibits section). Construction of Canada House is captured in the 2006 documentary feature Souvenir of Canada, which was conceived as a motion picture adaptation of the books (see Film, Theatre and Television section).

=== Terry (2005) ===
Using the format of City of Glass and Souvenir of Canada, Coupland released a book for the Terry Fox Foundation titled Terry. It is a photographic look back on the life of Fox, the result of Coupland's exhaustive research through the Terry Fox archives, including thousands of emotional letters from Canadians written to Fox during his one-legged marathon across Canada on Highway 1.

=== JPod (2006) ===
The third work of fiction in this period, written concurrently with the non-fiction Terry, is another re-envisioning of a previous book. Billed as Microserfs for the Google generation, JPod is Coupland's first Web 2.0 novel. The text of JPod recreates the experience of a novel read online on a notebook computer. JPod was a popular success, giving rise to a 13-episode CBC Television series scripted by Coupland (see Television section).

=== The Gum Thief (2007) ===
Coupland's The Gum Thief followed JPod in 2007. The novel takes the form of a journal shared between two despondent co-workers at a North Vancouver Staples outlet: Roger, a divorced, alcoholic, would-be writer; and Bethany, a sensitive, overweight Goth girl living with her mother. Comprising alternating entries in which the two characters reflect on their lives and commiserate, as well as drafts of Roger’s novel, The Gum Thief is one of Coupland’s most narratively experimental works, and the writer’s third foray into the epistolary form following Microserfs and JPod.

=== Generation A (2009) ===
Coupland published Generation A in the summer and fall of 2009. In terms of style, Generation A "mirrors the structure of 1991's Generation X as it champions the act of reading and storytelling as one of the few defenses we still have against the constant bombardment of the senses in a digital world". The novel takes place in the near future, after bees have become extinct, and focuses on five people from around the globe who are connected by being stung.

=== Extraordinary Canadians: Marshall McLuhan (2009), aka Marshall McLuhan: You Know Nothing of my Work! (2010) ===
In September 2009 Coupland released a biography of Canadian media theorist Marshall McLuhan. In Canada the biography was published as part of Penguin's Extraordinary Canadians series; while in the United States it was published in late 2010 under the title Marshall McLuhan: You Know Nothing of My Work! (the subtitle is a reference to a line uttered by McLuhan himself in Woody Allen’s film Annie Hall). The biography was very well received, making the cover of the New York Times Weekend Book Review, with the reviewer noting that “the book rewards by refusing to slip into the numbing vortex of academic discourse, taking a fizzy, pop-culture approach to explaining a deep thinker.”

=== Player One (2010) ===
In 2010, Coupland was selected as the lecturer for the annual CBC Massey Lectures, an acclaimed Canadian lecture series started in 1961. Coupland's contribution for the 2010 Massey Lectures, as opposed to a standard long essay, was a 50,000 word novel entitled Player One – What Is to Become of Us: A Novel in Five Hours. Coupland wrote the novel as five hour-long lectures which aired on CBC Radio from November 8 to 12 of that year. According to Coupland, the novel "... presents a wide array of modes to view the mind, the soul, the body, the future, eternity, technology, and media" and is set "In a B-list Toronto airport hotel's cocktail lounge in August of 2010." The lecture/novel was published in its own right on October 7, 2010. On September 20, 2010, Player One was announced as part of the initial longlist for the 2010 Scotiabank Giller Prize literary award, Coupland's second long-listing for the prize after being long-listed in 2006 with jPod.

=== Highly Inappropriate Tales for Young People (2011) ===
Coupland followed Player One with a second short story collection, this time in collaboration with the artist Graham Roumieu, entitled Highly Inappropriate Tales for Young People. The publisher described the book as "seven pants-peeingly funny stories featuring seven evil characters you can't help but love".

=== Worst. Person. Ever. (2013) ===
Worst. Person. Ever. was released in Canada and the UK in October 2013, and in the US in April 2014. Written first as a short story that appeared in issue 29 of McSweeny’s, the novel is a picaresque following the misadventures of one Raymond Gunt, described by the publishers as “a dreadful human being with absolutely no redeeming social value.”

=== Shopping in Jail (2013) ===
2013 also saw the publication of his collection of essays, Shopping in Jail: Ideas, Essays and Stories for the Increasingly Real Twenty-First Century. Here, Coupland ruminates on topics as various as dumpster-diving, Edward Ruscha, sex and love in the 21st century, and the history and landscape of his home province, British Columbia, in Canada.

=== Kitten Clone: Inside Alcatel-Lucen (2014) ===
With his 2014 non-fiction book Kitten Clone: Inside Alcatel-Lucen, Coupland revisited one of his most enduring fascinations: the relationship between technology and society. Published simply as Inside Alcatel-Lucent in the United States, the book is a journalistic investigation of the titular technology company, which was (prior to its merger with Nokia) responsible for much of the communication infrastructure underlying the internet. The book was described by one reviewer for The Economist as “a multi-continental stroll through the company’s business,” one which is "enlivened" by Coupland’s humour and wit. The book contained photos by Magnum photographer Olivia Arthur.

=== The Age of Earthquakes (2015) ===
In 2015, Coupland co-authored The Age of Earthquakes: A Guide to the Extreme Present along with Shumon Bashar and Hans Ulrich Obrist. The title comes from a geological notion that once melted, vast amounts of melted water from Earth’s poles will create a fundamental shift on earth’s tectonic plates triggering a new seismic age. The book was written in the spirit of Quentin Fiore’s 1969 collaboration with Marshall McLuhan The Medium is the Massage, and has been described as “equal parts self-help and art book.” Consisting of text inter-leavened with images, it is a free-flowing disquisition on how the internet’s reach is changing both humanity and the planet. It also includes a glossary of neologisms attempting to diagnose the spirit of the times, featuring such terms as “no-collar worker,” “de-selfing,” and “smupid.”

=== Search (2015) ===
In 2015 and 2016 Coupland was Artist-in-Residence at the Google Cultural Institute in Paris. One publication that emerged from this period was an elongated hardcover book, Search, which Coupland created in collaboration with Google staff. In it, Coupland takes one thousand search terms and then lists the top one hundred hits emerging from that term. Search thus functions as a snapshot of humanity’s prevailing concerns as reflected in their internet search queries.

=== Bit Rot (2016) ===
In 2016 Coupland released his omnibus Bit Rot. The book was an expanded version of a catalogue he had created for his Bit Rot art exhibition, which was mounted in both Germany and Holland from 2015 to 2017. Composed of an eclectic mixture of short essays and fiction written since 2005, Coupland intended the formal structure and style of the book to replicate the associative, free-ranging process of internet surfing. Though Coupland reflects on a range of topics, his prevailing focus here is on the changes wrought by the advent of the internet.

=== The Extreme Self (2021) ===
"Selfie" (self-portrait) of Coupland in Detroit, 2026

Coupland once again collaborated with Shumon Basar and Hans Ulrich Obrist for The Extreme Self, published in 2021. Conceived as a sequel to The Age of Earthquakes, The Extreme Self similarly employs a dynamic mixture of text and curated images in order to investigate humanity’s experience of self-hood in an age of rapid technological and political flux.

=== Binge (2021) ===
Also in 2021, Coupland published Binge, his first work of fiction in eight years. The book comprises 60 narrative vignettes, each lasting a few pages, and narrated by a diverse range of characters. Written as “an x-ray of our culture at a certain time,” in Coupland’s words, many of the stories deal with characters attempting to square their lived experiences with the information that is broadcast about them online. One reviewer characterized the stories as “blackly funny screenshots of our world.” The book’s cover features an image of Courteney Cox taken from Bruce Springsteen’s iconic 1984 “Dancing in the Dark” music video.

== Visual arts ==
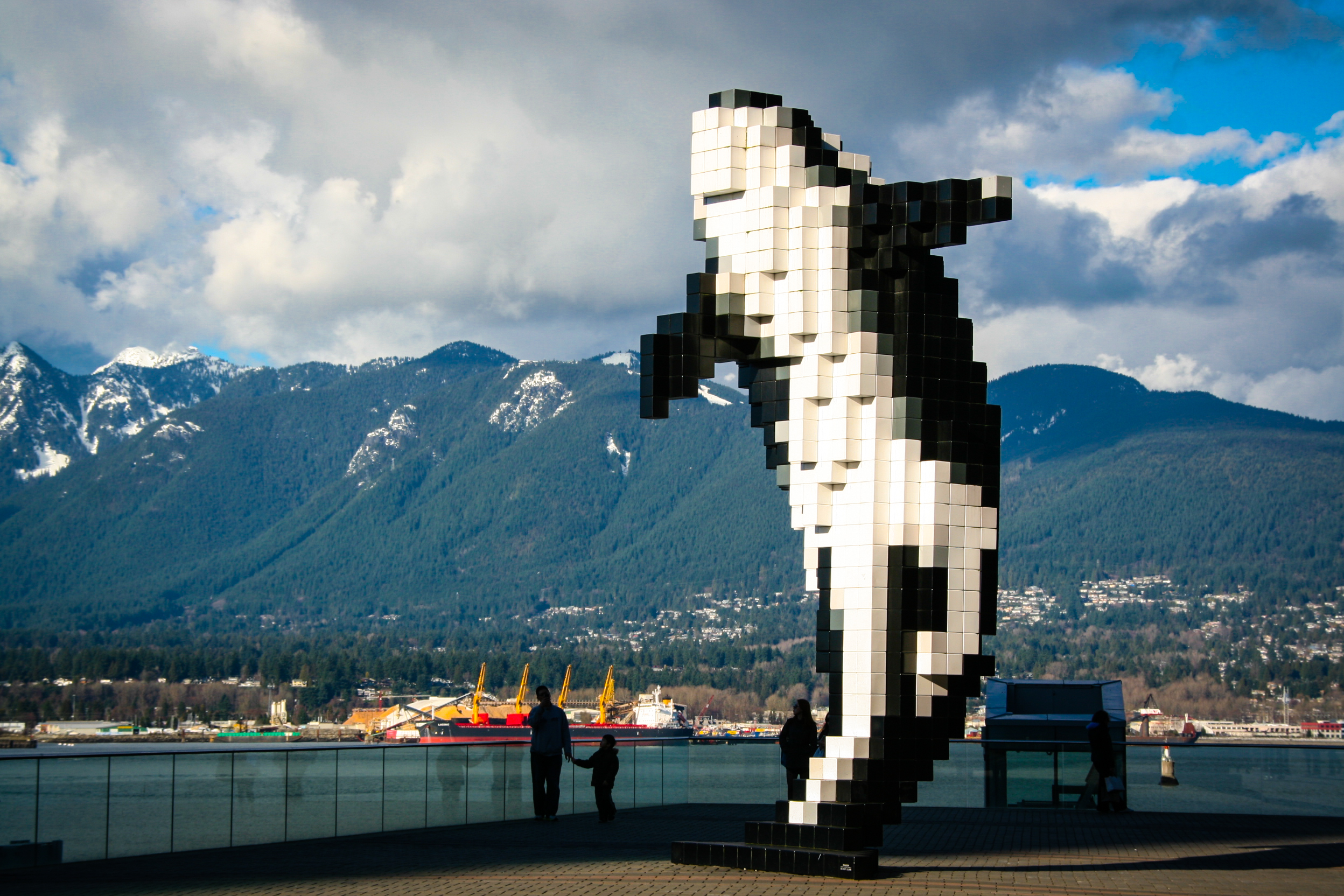
Digital Orca, 2009, located in Vancouver

Around the year 2000, Coupland increasingly began to focus on what had been his original passion–his visual art. Trained originally as a sculptor at Emily Carr University, his is a post-medium practice that employs a variety of materials and techniques, including sculpture, painting, printing, and photography. Coupland is an avid collector of things, and much of his work incorporates found objects and the products of mass manufacturing through assemblage. He is particularly influenced by the 20th-century pop art of Andy Warhol, whom he has cited as a major formative influence alongside artist Jenny Holzer, and a common theme in his work is a curiosity with the corrupting and seductive dimensions of pop culture. At the same time, his art has evinced a concern with the environmental footprint of mass consumption, particularly marine pollution. As much a product of the 21st century as it is of the 20th century, Coupland’s art has also attempted to grapple with the rapid progression of information technology and the societal changes wrought by the advent of the internet. Coupland is a major figure in his native Canada as well as internationally, and his art has also sought to define the contours of Canadian national identity. Another recurring theme is military imagery, the result of growing up in a military family at the height of the Cold War.

Coupland’s art has been exhibited in numerous galleries both in his native Canada and internationally. He has also been commissioned to create numerous public art installations appearing throughout Canada, a few of the most notable being Canoe Landing Park and Monument to the War of 1812 in Toronto, and Digital Orca in Vancouver. Coupland has also taken on the role of curator. In 2019, he co-curated Welcome to the Age of You for the Museum of Contemporary Art Toronto along with Shumon Basar and Hans-Ulrich Obrist.

Coupland is represented by the Daniel Faria Gallery in Toronto.

=== Art exhibitions ===
==== Floating World (1987) ====
Coupland’s very first solo exhibition as a newly-minted art school graduate was his 1987 Floating World, which ran at the Vancouver Art Gallery from November 20 to January 28. The exhibition comprised more than 200 hand-crafted sculptures representing a variety of objects on an oversized scale, including giant pipes, pills, oars, antlers, surveyor’s transits, magnets, metronomes, and slabs of bacon. The show was received favorably, with one reviewer noting that “the sculptures are unique and fascinating in their oddity,” and another observing that “it works as more than a jumble because these objects are set up as sensitively as the Japanese rock gardens and flower arranging Coupland has studied.” Although the show was a success, Coupland’s then-burgeoning trajectory as a writer (he was soon to produce the career-making Generation X) meant he would not mount another art exhibition for more than a decade.

==== Spike (2001) ====
Coupland’s first solo art show marking a return to his roots as a visual artist was Spike, which ran at the Monte Clarke Gallery in Vancouver in 2001. The exhibition featured life-sized plastic toy soldiers with missing limbs, positioned amid giant sculpted bottles of household cleaning products. It reflected anxieties surrounding the everyday chemicals and plastics permeating modern life. After being shown in Vancouver, the exhibition moved to New York City where, opening on September 9 at the Totem Gallery, it was overshadowed by the September 11th attacks on the World Trade Center, a mere few blocks away.

==== The Canada Pictures (2002) ====
Coupland's Canada Picture No. 9, exhibited in Toronto and published in his book Souvenir of Canada.

Installation view of an early iteration of Coupland's Canada House from 2003.

In 2002, Coupland presented The Canada Pictures at Toronto’s Monte Clark Gallery. The series comprised ten large-format photographs originally created for his book Souvenir of Canada, with the exhibition timed to coincide with the book’s release. The photographs depict familiar consumer goods and objects associated with Canadian domestic life, abundantly arranged in the still life tradition. Through these compositions, Coupland constructed a portrait of national identity grounded in everyday material culture.

==== Canada House (2003-2004) ====
In 2003, Coupland extended his exploration of national identity with Canada House, an installation staged within a vacant, soon-to-be-demolished bungalow in suburban Richmond. The interior was filled with custom-designed furniture and artworks assembled from found materials collected from across Canada. Notable pieces included the “Treaty Couch,” whose two seats comprised a wide one upholstered in tartan (a colonial reference to the United Kingdom) and another impracticably narrow one made from a Quw’utsun (Cowichan First Nation) sweater. The house also featured themed-rooms, including the “Hoser Room,” described as “littered with beer cans, Export A cigarette packages, a Rush concert poster, butter tarts and Sears catalogues (left open, of course, to the ladies underwear section).” One critic characterized the project as “an oddly poignant monument to an ad hoc notion of national identity.” The installation was documented in Coupland’s book Souvenir of Canada II and in the 2006 documentary film Souvenir of Canada. Though dismantled shortly after photography, it was reconstructed in 2004 at the Design Exchange in Toronto, with select pieces later exhibited at Canada House in Trafalgar Square, London.

==== Lost and Gained in Translation (2005) ====
In the summer of 2005, Coupland’s show Lost and Gained in Translation ran at the Monte Clark Gallery in Toronto. It included a series of sculptures resembling hornets’ nests, which were created using paper pulp Coupland had made by chewing up the pages from his own published novels. Another nest in the series was similarly made from masticated dollar bills (representing his royalties therefrom), while another incorporated pages from the Gideon Bible–a nod to the hotel rooms of Coupland’s book tours. As Coupland explained, the nests were meant to reposition these cultural products within a biological process, shifting them from cultural to organic time.

==== Super City (2005) ====
Installation view of Super City, Coupland's 2005 exhibition at the Canadian Centre for Architecture.

Also in 2005, the Canadian Centre for Architecture presented Super City, a sculptural installation created by Coupland. Using pieces from toy building kits popular among children in the 1960s (including Lego, Tinkertoy, Meccano and the eponymous Super City) Coupland created modular structures which were then placed alongside large-scale, monochrome models of highrises, watertowers, and other urban buildings. Also included were replicas of Toronto’s CN Tower and New York City’s World Trade Center. Coupland intended the installation as an exploration of the way children’s building kits provide a formative framework for understanding the urban environment. Addressing the World Trade Center replica, he described his intention to “create some sort of architectural heaven for the towers.”

==== Mom and Dad (2009) ====
Coupland’s exhibition Mom and Dad, which ran at Vancouver’s Monte Clark Gallery in 2009, saw the artist grappling with the ubiquitous influence of Andy Warhol. The show comprised two conceptually linked series, Matricide and Patricide. While Matricide reworked Warhol’s famous Marilyn Monroe portraits through acts of embellishment and defacement (incorporating elements such as food labels, skateboard stickers and cartoon flowers), Patricide consisted of a series of peroxide blond wigs–reminiscent of those worn by Warhol himself–flattened under glass and presented in gilt frames. Notably, the wigs–which were designed by Coupland and assembled by drag artist Michael Venus–were made with synthetic hair and real fur, including that of taxidermied animals native to the Canadian arctic.

==== Slogans for the 21st Century (2011) ====
In mid-2011, Coupland began his iterative Slogans for the 21st Century series. Originally conceived as a promotional tool for an event at Vancouver’s Waldorf nightclub, Coupland’s Slogans started off as a series of posters printed with statements prompted by the question “What could I tell myself 10 years ago that would make no sense to that old ‘me’?” Featuring messages such as “I miss my pre-internet brain” and “Lives are no longer feeling like stories,” the idea for the Slogans was inspired by the work of both artist Jenny Holzer and media theorist Marshall McLuhan, with Coupland describing them as an attempt to “address the early 21st century mental condition head on.” Coupland then recreated the series by painting them on plywood, and first exhibited them at the Trepanier Baer Gallery in Calgary in late 2011. Coupland’s Slogans have since gone through a number of expansions and iterations, often in response to contemporary events, and have been featured in numerous exhibitions around the world.

==== Welcome to the Twenty-First Century (2012) ====
Pi to 1,000, part of Coupland's painted QR Code series.

With his exhibition Welcome to the Twenty-First Century, which ran at the Daniel Faria Gallery in Toronto in 2012, Coupland described his intent to “explore how it feels to be inside the 21st-century brain as opposed to the 20th-century brain.” The second to feature his Slogans for the 21st Century series, the exhibition also contained a series of large-scale, brightly-coloured painted QR codes which, when decoded on viewers’ smart phones, delivered ominous messages, or prayers, such as “I Hope We Become Able to Protect Ourselves From Ourselves.” Another series consisted of reproductions of famous landscape paintings by Tom Thomson and the Group of Seven that Coupland had dramatically altered using digital photo-editing programs. The re-worked paintings were described by one reviewer as “an obvious nod to the vast distance the artist, in a high-tech world, feels himself to be from the naturalist painters’ woodsy pursuits.”

==== everywhere is anywhere is anything is everything (2014-2015) ====
In the summer of 2014, the Vancouver Art Gallery hosted the first major retrospective of Coupland’s art. Entitled everywhere is anywhere is anything is everything, it featured upwards of a hundred pieces created over the previous fifteen years as well as several major new works. The exhibition was also captured on Google Street View and displayed virtually in collaboration with Google Arts and Culture. In early 2015, the exhibition moved to Toronto, where it was hosted between two locations, the Royal Ontario Museum and the Museum of Contemporary Art. A special hardcover catalogue of the exhibit was published featuring essays by a number of contributors, including William Gibson, Hans Ultrich Obrist, Chuck Klosterman, James Gleick, Sophia al Maria and Michael Stipe.

==== Bit Rot (2015-2017) ====
Between 2015 and 2017, Bit Rot was exhibited. Coupland’s first large-scale solo show in Europe, it was hosted first in Rotterdam at the (then) Witte de With Center for Contemporary Art (now the Kunstinstituut Melly) in the fall of 2015, before moving to Villa Stuck in Munich in early 2016. Intended as an exploration of the internet and the concomitant accelerated exchange of visual information, it included Coupland’s Deep Face portrait series, wherein the faces of photographed subjects are obscured with colourful blocks of paint (a prophylactic against facial recognition software). It also featured “The Living Internet,” an installation consisting of cast sculptures of various objects affixed to roomba-like devices and given free-run in a large pen. Conceived during Coupland’s 2015 Paris Residency with Google Arts and Culture, the installation was intended as a visual metaphor for the process of online searching. Coupland also released a collection of essays and short fiction–the identically-titled “Bit Rot”–as a catalogue to the exhibition.

==== Vortex (2018-2019) ====
In May 2018, Coupland unveiled Vortex, a major sculptural installation exhibited at the Vancouver Aquarium. Composed largely of plastic man-made debris that had washed ashore on British Columbia’s Haida Gwaii archipelago (much of it as a result of the 2011 Japanese tsunami), the installation was an attempt to visualize the Pacific Trash Vortex and highlight the consequences of marine plastic pollution. Among the debris discovered during the cleanup event was a Japanese fishing boat that was traced back to a fisherman from Ishinomaki, who gave permission for the vessel to be used in the exhibition. Coupland placed the boat in the middle of a large pool, surrounded by floating plastic detritus. Described by one critic as possibly Coupland’s “most didactic work,” the year-long exhibition ran until April 30, 2019.

==== The National Portrait (2018) ====
Coupland’s National Portrait was an exhibition of hundreds of 3D-printed busts of average Canadian citizens which opened on June 29, 2018, at the Ottawa Art Gallery. The project was commissioned by Simons, a Canadian department store, and volunteers from across Canada had their heads digitally scanned at store events between July 2015 until April 2017. Large 3D busts were printed from the scans, which Coupland then painted, embellished, and assembled into a “garden-like formation.” In total, 1,700 members of the public volunteered their image, and each volunteer received a hand-sized version of their own 3D-printed bust. The exhibition ran until August 19, 2018, and has been divided into four subinstallations in various Simons stores across Canada.

Coupland's Fordite 1969 Mustang, shown as part of his 2020 exhibition Fordite: Neominerology in the Anthropocene, on display at the Daniel Faria Gallery in Toronto.

==== Fordite (2020) ====
In early 2020, the Daniel Faria Gallery in Toronto presented Coupland's Fordite: Neominerology in the Anthropocene. The exhibition featured vintage car hoods painted to mimic fordite—a multi-coloured accretion formed from layers of industrial enamel, a byproduct of automotive spray-painting processes. A series of fishing floats, which Coupland had salvaged from the coast of British Columbia following the 2011 Japanese tsunami, were similarly painted and displayed. The works juxtapose the visual allure of fordite with its origin as an industrial residue, foregrounding its status as a toxic material permeating the natural environment.

Doom, by Coupland. A photographic re-enactment of a scene from his novel Girlfriend in a Coma.

==== Rabbit Lane (2022) ====
In the spring 2022, the West Vancouver Art Museum presented Rabbit Lane, a series of large-format photographs re-staging scenes from Coupland’s 1998 novel Girlfriend in a Coma. The photographs were shot in the eponymous West Vancouver neighbourhood where much of the novel takes places, inside local houses and properties, and using local volunteer participants as models. While the images reconstruct narrative moments from the novel, Coupland emphasized the primacy of the built environment appearing in the photographs, noting that “the star of the show is in one sense the houses in the show."

==== The New Ice Age (2023) ====
In Coupland’s solo exhibition The New Ice Age, which ran at Toronto’s Daniel Faria Gallery in 2023, the artist presented a series of hand-painted representations of icebergs on canvas. Coupland had been fascinated by icebergs since childhood, when he would sometimes accompany his pilot father on flights over the Arctic. Coupland conceived the series on a transatlantic flight in 2021 when, looking down at Baffin Island from the air, he observed that “this time, the icebergs, something was wrong with them … they looked like they’d had a spell put on them, a hex…” The paintings marked a major technical shift for Coupland as this was his first entirely hand-made body of visual art. As he noted, “I’ve been doing visual art since 1999, and all of it was in some way mediated by technology. So it became very important that I do painting entirely from my brain.” Notably, he linked this change to grief after his mother’s death: “If you lose someone important in your life, about 14 or 15 months later, you’re going to change as a human being… My mother died and about 14 months later I said, ‘you have to stop using machines, you have to start using your brain, electric signals going through your muscles, bones on the wood, bristles, paint, surface.’ I think having a trace of my central nervous system on a surface became important, then it became addictive, and it remains addictive.”

Selected works from Coupland's New Ice Age exhibition

Tobacco Iceberg

French's Mustard with Strawberry Sauce

Left: Off of Labrador
Right: Ellesmere

==== Lazy Susan (2025) ====
At Toronto's Daniel Faria Gallery in November and December of 2025, Coupland presented Lazy Susan, an exhibition which the Gallery described as representing “a culmination of Coupland’s well-known, decades-long artifact accumulations.” The sculptures featured in the exhibition were made from fragments and cross-sections of various found objects, mixing disposable, mass-produced items with luxurious items, in geometric shapes reminiscent of Cubism. The title of the show referred to Coupland’s process in making the sculptures: each was assembled with the use of a continuously rotating Lazy Susan, allowing Coupland to consider every aspect of a piece during its construction.

Installation view of Coupland's 2025 exhibition Lazy Susan, on display at the Daniel Faria Gallery, Toronto.

==== Group Exhibitions ====
As well as featuring in numerous solo exhibitions, Coupland's art has appeared as part of a number of group exhibitions.

In October 2003, Coupland participated in The Basement Show, a one-week group exhibition staged in the subterranean levels of the former BC Electric Building in Vancouver. The other participating artists–Angela Grossman, Attila Richard Lukacs, Derek Root, and Graham Gilmore–were all friends of Coupland’s, dating from their time together as art students at the Emily Carr College of Art and Design. Coupland’s contribution to the show included an installation entitled Tropical Birds. Inspired by the Columbine Tragedy of 1997, it was a surreal representation of a high school cafeteria, with melted plastic chairs, life-sized figures crouched in prayer and fear, and a recorded soundtrack playing the sound of bird calls (a reference to the chirping of unanswered pagers left abandoned by the evacuating students). Following its run in Vancouver, the Basement Show moved to Calgary, where it ran the Contemporary Art Museum during the summer of 2004.

In 2004, the dormant Saarinen-designed TWA Flight Center (now Jetblue Terminal 5) at John F. Kennedy International Airport briefly hosted an art exhibition called Terminal 5, curated by Rachel K. Ward and featuring the work of 18 artists including Coupland.

In 2016, Assembling the Future was exhibited at The Manege in St. Petersburg, Russia. The exhibition was organized and curated by Marcello Dantas. Also in 2016, Coupland's works were exhibited in It's All Happening So Fast : A Counter-History of the Modern Canadian Environment at the Canadian Centre for Architecture.

Dragon, a sculptural work by Coupland, part of his Chardonnay series, on display at the 2025 Art Toronto fair.

In 2025, Coupland’s sculptural series Chardonnay was featured as part of that year’s Art Toronto, a Toronto-based international art fair. The series was inspired by a freak weather event which occurred in 2024 in British Columbia’s wine-producing Okanagan region, when unseasonably frigid temperatures decimated the grape crop for that year. Coupland salvaged some of the dead vines from vineyards in Osoyoos and cast them in bronze. Individually mounted, the metallic vine forms are meant to resemble animals, and it was Coupland’s intent that together they should represent “the moment when the animals on Noah’s Ark return to the world at the end of the Flood.”

===== Select group exhibitions =====
- Beyond Words, The Dox Centre for Contemporary Art, Prague, 2023
- Art in the Age of Anxiety, Sharjah Art Foundation, 2020
- It's Urgent, LUMA Foundation, Arles, 2020
- IN FOCUS: Statements, Copenhagen Contemporary, 2020
- Electronic Superhighway, Whitechapel Gallery, London, 2017
- It's All Happening So Fast, Canadian Centre for Architecture, Montreal, 2016
- The Heart Is a Deceitful Above All Things, HOME Contemporary Arts Centre, Manchester, 2015
- The Fab Mind, 21 21 Design Sight, the Issey Miyake Foundation, Tokyo, 2014
- Do It, Ciclo (Cycle), Centro Cultural do Brasil, São Paulo, 2013
- Billboard, Biennial of the Americas, Denver, 2013
- Supersurrealism, 2012 Moderna Museet, Stockholm, 2012
- Posthastism, Pavilion Gallery, Beijing, 2011

=== Public works ===
Coupland has created numerous public art installations that are located throughout Canada. Two of his most notable works are Canoe Landing Park in Toronto and Digital Orca in Vancouver.

Monument to the War of 1812 (2008)

In 2008, Coupland installed his Monument to the War of 1812 at the corner of Fleet Street and Bathhurst street in Toronto. Located near the historic battle site of Fort York, the piece is a sculptural commemoration of the War of 1812 between British colonial troops in Canada and American forces. It depicts two giant, 4 metre-high toy soldiers: one in gold representing a British soldier, and another in silver representing an American soldier–the latter lying toppled. Coupland intended the sculpture both as a reminder of the pivotal significance of the war for Canadian nationhood (its outcome ultimately consisted in the successful defense of British territory leading to the establishment of Canada), as well as a simple rejoinder to what Coupland described as recent revisionist attempts by American sources claiming victory in the conflict. With its use of large-scale toy soldiers, the piece also evinces Coupland’s characteristic fascination with the imagery of mass production and pop culture, and harkens back to his 2001 art exhibition Spike.

Digital Orca (2009)

In 2009, Coupland’s Digital Orca was installed in the Jack Poole Plaza next to the Vancouver Convention Centre. A sculptural representation of an orca whale measuring approximately 25 feet in height, it was made up of large black and white aluminum cubes reminiscent of computer pixels, thereby giving it the appearance of a low-resolution digital image. Coupland explained that, “through the act of pixelizing an orca whale in three dimensions - a process that creates a crackling and unexpected sensation in the viewers mind - the orca cliché is turned upside down and what we thought we knew well is rendered exciting and new.”

Canoe Landing Park (various pieces - 2010)

In 2006, Coupland was commissioned to co-create a new park for Toronto’s Concord City Place along with a team of landscape architects. In the spring of 2010 the park–officially named “Canoe Landing Park” following a naming competition–was opened to the public. The park featured a number of art installations conceived by Coupland, including a giant red canoe atop a man-made hill, a group of giant, free-standing fishing float replicas, a large sculpted beaver dam, and a pathway and sculpture commemorating the late Terry Fox. Coupland had also intended to include a toboggan run, but the prospect of a snow-deprived future owing to global warming persuaded him to drop the idea.

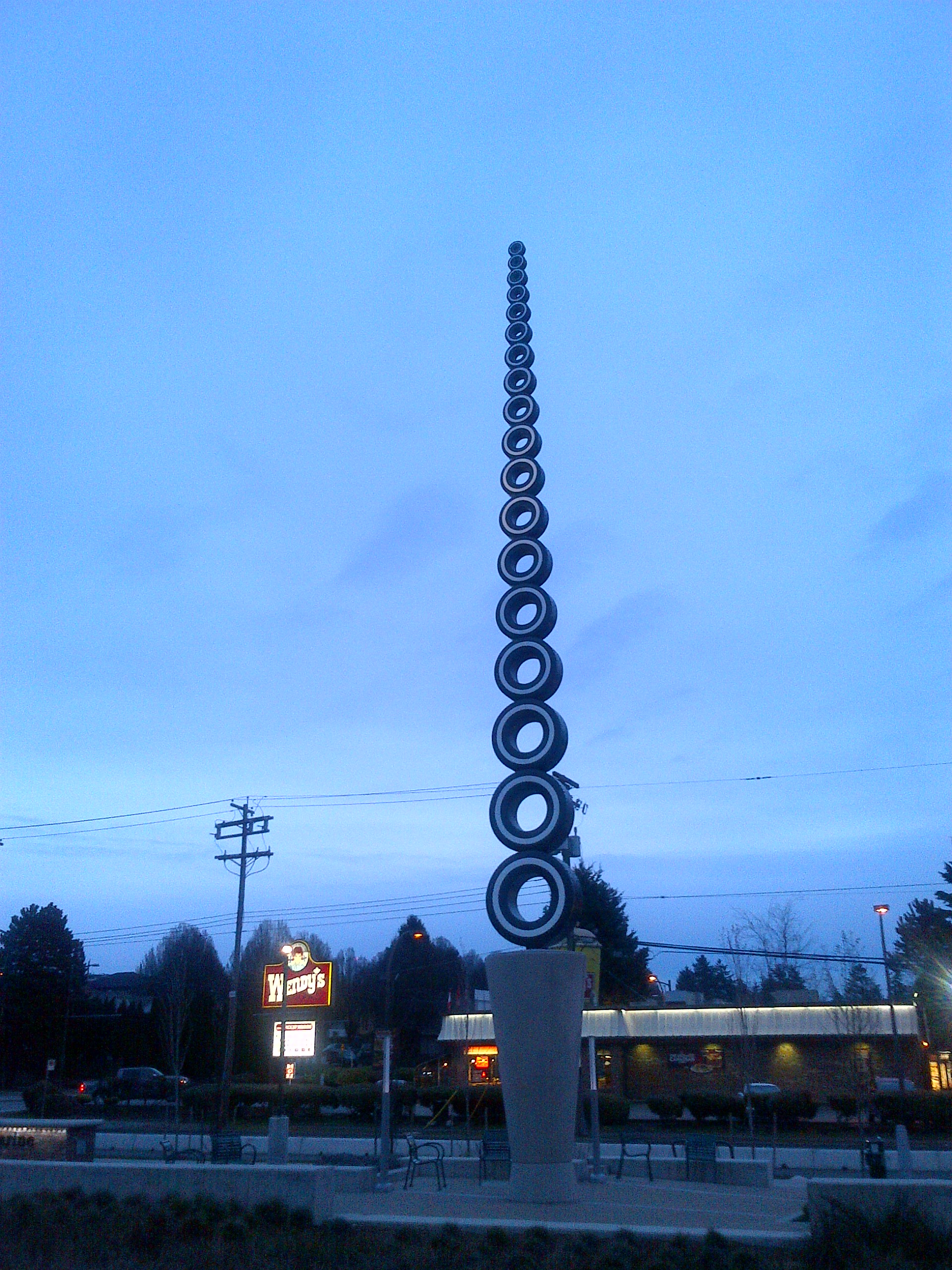
Infinite Tires, 2012, located in Vancouve

Infinite Tires (2012)

In October 2012, the 60-foot tall Infinite Tires was erected as part of Vancouver's public art program to accompany the opening of a Canadian Tire store. The construct was linked to the concept of Romanian artist Constantin Brâncuși's Infinite Column.

Canadian Fallen Firefighters Memorial (2014)

In September 2010, Coupland, in collaboration with Toronto’s PLANT Architect firm, was awarded the commission to create a new national monument in Ottawa honoring fallen firefighters. The resulting work, the Canadian Fallen Firefighters Memorial, was unveiled two years later in September 2012. The central element of the memorial is an 18-feet-tall bronze firefighter positioned at the base of a fire pole, who gestures toward a surrounding granite wall inscribed with the names of firefighters killed in the line of duty or from work-related illnesses. Serving as a national site of remembrance, it is located at LeBreton Flats, directly across from the Canadian War Museum.

Golden Tree (2016)

In 2014, Coupland announced plans to construct in south Vancouver a gold-coloured sculptural replica of Stanley Park's iconic Hollow Tree, a giant, 800-year old western red cedar tree trunk, and a popular tourist site in the city. Golden Tree was unveiled on August 6, 2016. Standing at 14 metres in height, Coupland’s sculpture is a mirror image of the Hollow Tree at 1:1 scale, and is made of steel-enforced resin coated in a gold patina. When asked in an interview why he chose the Hollow Tree as his subject, Coupland commented that the tree represents a conscientiousness towards nature particular to the city of Vancouver. He further offered his thoughts on his decision to finish the sculpture in gold, describing gold as having an otherworldly quality which “makes you think [about] what you're in the presence of.”

Northern Lights (2019)

In 2017, Coupland was commissioned by the developers of the Telus Sky tower in Calgary to create a dynamic LED light installation integrated into the building’s façade. Working in collaboration with the building’s designer, Danish architect Bjarke Ingels, Coupland developed a system of light sequencing that animates the building’s irregular geometry. The result is a large-scale public art installation that transforms the tower into a continuously shifting field of color and pattern in a manner emulating the titular Northern Lights. The piece also extends Coupland’s longstanding interest in nature, technology, and the visual language of data. Northern Lights was unveiled to the public in April 2019.

Gordie Howe Bridge Installation (2025)

On October 24, 2024, the Gordie Howe International Bridge project team named Coupland as the artist selected for its Aesthetic Lighting commission. Coupland announced his plans to illuminate the $6.4 billion bridge–which spans the Detroit River between Windsor, Ontario and Detroit, Michigan–with a field of approximately 5,000 lights. As with the artist’s 2019 Northern Lights installation, Coupland planned for the lights to be activated in slow, undulating sequences intended to echo the movement of the aurora borealis. The Gordie Howe International bridge was due to be opened in September 2025.

==== Complete list of public works ====
CANADA

Alberta

- Northern Lights (2020) - Telus Sky Building, 685 Centre Street, Calgary

British Columbia

- Digital Orca (2009) - Jack Poole Plaza, Vancouver Convention Centre, Vancouver
- Terry Fox Memorial (2011) - Terry Fox Memorial Plaza, corner of Beatty and Robson, Vancouver
- Infinite Tires (2012) - 26 SW Marine Drive, Vancouver
- Bow Tie (2015) - Park Royal Shopping Centre, 1060 Park Royal St, West Vancouver
- Golden Tree (2016) - corner of SW Marine Drive and Cambie Street, Vancouver
- Water off a Duck’s Back (2020) - River Green Development, 6699 River Road, Richmond
- The Snag (2021) - Grosvenor Ambleside Development, 1355 Bellevue Avenue, West Vancouver
- Fordite (2022) - Station Square, 6000 McKay Ave, Burnaby
- Sunset Beach Love Letter (2022) - Muro Building, 1770 Davie Street, Vancouver
- Spawn (2023) - Atrium between Vancouver Centre II and Scotia Tower, 733 Seymour Street, Vancouver
- Ghosts of Blood Alley (2023) - Mural at 23 W. Cordova Street, Vancouver, BC

Ontario

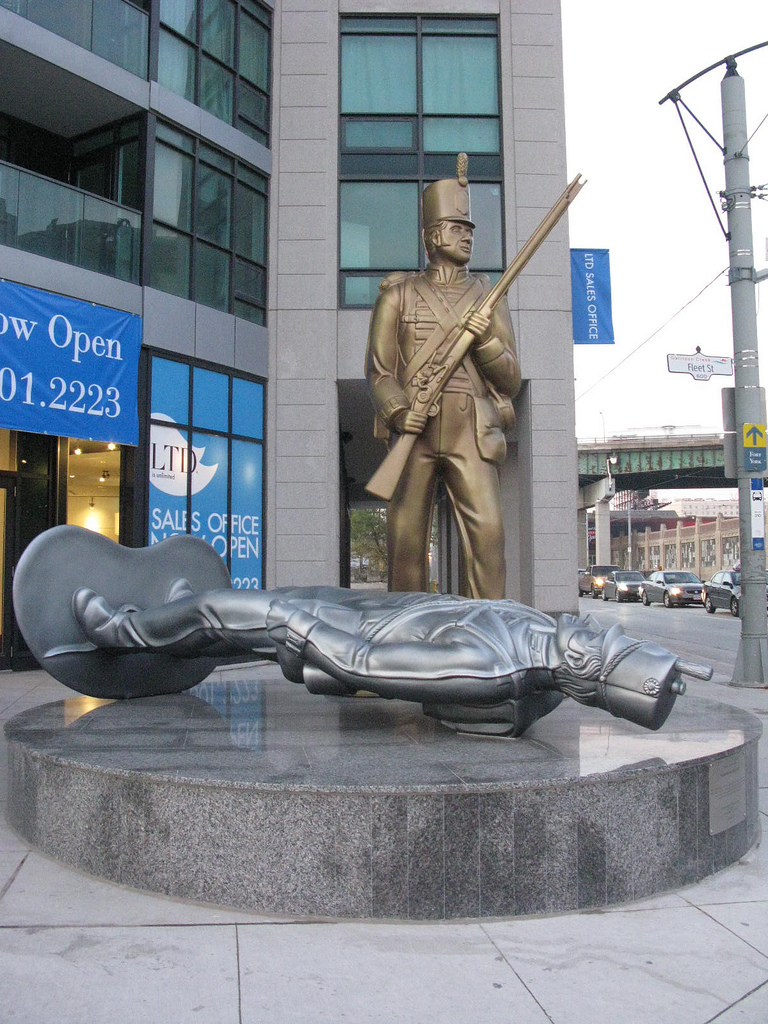
Monument to the War of 1812, 2008, located at the intersection of Fleet and Bathurst Street in Toronto

- Monument to the War of 1812 (2008) - 600 Fleet Street, Toronto
- Canoe Landing Park (various, 2009) - 95 Fort York Blvd, Toronto
  - The Terry Fox Miracle Mile
  - Tom Thompson’s Red Canoe
  - Iceberg Benches
  - Bobbers Plaza
- A History of Fur Trading in Canada (2009) - RBC Centre, 155 Wellington St W, Toronto
- Group Portrait 1957 (2011) - The Robert McLaughlin Gallery, 72 Queen St, Oshawa
- Canadian Fallen Firefighters Memorial (2012) - 220 Lett Street, Ottawa
- Four Seasons (2014) - Parkway Forest Community Centre, 55 Forest Manor Road, Toronto
- Super Signals (2018) - Cedarvale subway station, intersection of Eglinton Avenue West and Allen Road, Toronto
- Lone Pine Sunset (2019) - Parliament station, intersection of O’Connor and Queen Streets, Ottawa

== Journalism ==
Coupland has written extensively across journalism, criticism, and cultural commentary, contributing to a wide range of periodicals over several decades beginning in the late 1980s. His essays and articles have appeared in major international publications and newspapers including Wired, The New York Times, and The Guardian. Coupland is also a longtime columnist for the Financial Times’ FT Magazine, where his essays have addressed contemporary culture and technology. His writing has also appeared in Vice, and in contemporary art publications including Artforum and e-flux journal.

== Design work ==
In addition to his writing and artwork, Coupland has engaged in a number of design projects involving furniture, clothing, and living spaces. After receiving a diploma in sculpture from the Emily Carr College of Art and Design in 1984, Coupland did a semester on scholarship at the Istituto Europeo di Design in Milan, Italy. In 1985, in Richmond, Greater Vancouver, he worked for several months at Storkcraft Furniture designing baby cribs, a job he recalled favorably as providing him with valuable hands-on experience: “I had to learn everything–federal regulations on spray-booth toxicity, pricing woods from all over the world, assembly-line bar-coding, choosing stains, dealing with sales and marketing people, learning the intricacies of assembly lines, and on and on. I don't know how schools teach industrial design ... but there's nothing like getting in there and messing with wood samples and machines."

Having largely devoted himself to his writing in the early 1990s, Coupland began to dabble again in design work in the later part of that decade, creating bespoke sculptural artworks which doubled as functional pieces (such as lamps and chairs) which he sold through his company CMYK. Around this same time, Coupland partnered with the Edmonton-based Pure Design firm to design and produce a line of side tables. Released in 2000 as part of Pure Design’s larger furniture collection for that year, most of Coupland’s 9 laminated plywood tables were inspired by (and named for) a different famous pop artist, with an additional one (“The Henry”) modeled after the famous mid-century sculptural art of Henry Moore; while another (entitled “Hockey Night in Canada”) was inlaid with the iconic red and blue face-off circle of hockey rinks.

Coupland’s design work has not been limited to furniture. In June 2010, he announced his first efforts as a clothing designer by collaborating with Roots Canada on a collection that is a representation of classic Canadian icons. The Roots X Douglas Coupland collaboration was announced in The Globe and Mail and featured clothing, art installations, sculpture, custom designed art and retail spaces. The fashion collection, which was made up of summer streetwear for men and women as well as a line of leather and non-leather accessories, was well-received, and sold in the avant-garde clothing store Colette in Paris in September 2010.

In 2022, the fashion house Valentino released a line of streetwear designed in collaboration with Coupland in which the artist’s contemporary ‘Slogans’ were emblazoned across a series of garments in pink and black. Coupland also designed an invitational booklet for the runway debut of Pink PP, creative director Pierpalo Piccioli’s seasonal collection for that year. Printed in the collection’s signature “Valentino pink”, the booklet contained further iterations of Coupland’s slogans as well as his musings on the emancipatory power of the colour pink. Commenting on the collaboration, Coupland observed that “when you start working with the colour pink, you no longer have to deal with the real world. You automatically enter a world of fantasy, a world where other possibilities are true. It’s free thinking and it’s beautiful thinking.”

In 2025, Coupland was commissioned to redesign a prominent hotel suite in Fairmont’s Pacific Rim Hotel in Vancouver, British Columbia. Coupland conceived of the project as a deliberate rebuttal to what he considers the dull neutrality of most hotel rooms, and designed the room–dubbed 'Suite X'–to resemble his own personal living space, filling it with bright pop art, custom-made furniture, and a curated selection of books. Decorative pieces also included fragments of driftwood and other debris that Coupland had salvaged from the shores of Haida Gwaii following the Japanese tsunami of 2011. Coupland commented that the room reflected a cross between two of his prevailing interests: 20th-century pop culture and marine ecology.

== Television ==
In 2007, Coupland worked with the CBC to write and executive-produce a television series based on his novel jPod. Its 13 one-hour episodes aired in Canada in 2007. The show was cancelled despite a major viewer-initiated campaign to save it.

In 2013, Girlfriend in a Coma was mentioned as in pre-production for a limited series. Nothing has been published since.

== Film ==
2005 marked the release of a documentary about Coupland called Souvenir of Canada. In it, Coupland works on a grand art project about Canada, recounts his life, and muses about various aspects of Canadian identity.

2006 brought the release of Everything's Gone Green, a comedy film starring Paulo Costanzo, directed by Paul Fox, and written by Coupland. The film was produced by Radke Films and True West Films. The distributor is THINKFilm in Canada and Shoreline Entertainment elsewhere. The film, Coupland's first screenplay, won the award for best Canadian feature film at the 2006 Vancouver International Film Festival.

== Awards and recognition ==
Coupland has been described as "... possibly the most gifted exegete of North American mass culture writing today." and "one of the great satirists of consumerism".

In 2015, he was made a member of France's Ordre des Arts et des Lettres. In 2017, Coupland was awarded the 2017 Lieutenant Governor's Award for Literary Excellence. Coupland was made a member of the Royal Canadian Academy of Arts in 2007. In 2013, he was made an Officer of the Order of Canada "for his contributions to our examination of the contemporary human condition as a novelist, cultural commentator and artist". In 2014, Coupland was made a member of the Order of British Columbia.

Coupland received an honorary Doctor of Letters from the Emily Carr University of Art and Design (2001), an honorary Doctor of Letters from Simon Fraser University (2007), an honorary degree from the University of British Columbia (2010), an Honorary Doctor of Laws from Mount Allison University (2011), and an honorary doctorate degree from OCAD University (2013).

In 2010, the University of British Columbia announced that it had acquired Coupland's personal archives, the culmination of a project that began in 2002. The archives, which Coupland plans to continue to add to in the future, currently consist of 122 boxes and features about 30 metres of textual materials, including manuscripts, photos, visual art, fan mail, correspondence, press clippings, audio/visual material and more. One of the most notable inclusions in the collection includes the first hand-written manuscript of 'Generation X,' scrawled on loose-leaf notebook paper and strewn with margin notes. In a statement issued on the UBC website Coupland said, "I am honoured that UBC has accepted my papers. I hope that within them, people in the future will find patterns and constellations that can't be apparent to me or to anyone simply because they are there, and we are here...The donation process makes me feel old and yet young at the same time. I'm deeply grateful for UBC's support and enthusiasm." A new consignment of materials including "[...] everything from doodles and fan mail to a bejeweled hornet's nest to a Styrofoam leg for the archive arrived in July 2012[...]" arrived for sorting in July 2012. The sorting and categorisation of the new material was documented through the UBC School of Archival and Information Studies blog.

== Charity ==
Coupland is involved with Canada's Terry Fox Foundation. In 2005, Douglas & McIntyre published Terry, Coupland's biographical collection of photos and text essays about the life of legendary one-legged Canadian athlete Terry Fox. All proceeds from the book are donated to the foundation for cancer research. Terrys format is similar to that of Coupland's City of Glass and Souvenir of Canada books. Its release coincided with the 25th anniversary of Terry Fox's 1980 Marathon of Hope.

Coupland codesigned Canoe Landing Park, an eight-hectare urban park in downtown Toronto adjacent to the Gardiner Expressway. The park, opened 2009, is embedded with a one-mile run called the Terry Fox Miracle Mile. The Miracle Mile contains art from Terry.

Coupland has raised money for the Vancouver Art Gallery and the Western Canada Wilderness Committee by participating in advertising campaigns.

Coupland is also a regular contributor to Wikipedia; during his appearance at the Cheltenham Literary Festival (UK) in 2013, to promote his novel Worst. Person. Ever., Coupland said that he gives $200 a year to the online encyclopaedia.

== Personal life ==
Coupland lives and works in West Vancouver, British Columbia.

== Bibliography ==
=== Novels ===
- Worst. Person. Ever. (October 2013)
- Player One (2010) (Novel adapted from 2010 to 2011 Massey Lectures, long-listed for the Giller Prize)
- Generation A (2009) (finalist for the 2009 Rogers Writers' Trust Fiction Prize)
- The Gum Thief (2007)
- jPod (2006) (1st Hardcover Ed. ISBN 0-679-31424-5) (long-listed for the Giller Prize)
- Eleanor Rigby (2004)
- Hey Nostradamus! (2003)
- God Hates Japan (2001) (Published only in Japan, in Japanese with little English. Japanese title is 神は日本を憎んでる (Kami ha Nihon wo Nikunderu))
- All Families Are Psychotic (2001)
- Miss Wyoming (2000)
- Girlfriend in a Coma (1998)
- Microserfs (1995)
- Shampoo Planet (1992)
- Generation X: Tales for an Accelerated Culture (1991)

=== Short stories and story collections ===
- Binge (2021)
- Highly Inappropriate Tales for Young People (2011) (with Graham Roumieou)
- "Fire At The Ativan Factory" (1998), short story featured in Disco 2000
- Life After God (1994)

=== Non-fiction ===
- It's All Happening So Fast: A Counter-History of the Modern Canadian Environment (2017) (Contributor)
- Photography at MoMA: 1920 to 1960 (2016) (Contributor)
- Machines Will Make Better Choices Than Humans (2016) (Foreword: Michel Van Dartel)
- Bit Rot (catalog, 2015; expanded edition, 2016)
- The Age of Earthquakes: A Guide to the Extreme Present (2015) (with Shumon Basar and Hans Ulrich Obrist)
- Kitten Clone: Inside Alcatel-Lucent (2014)
- Shopping in Jail: Ideas Essays and Stories for the Increasingly Real 21st Century (2013)
- Extraordinary Canadians: Marshall McLuhan (2009)
- Terry (2005)
- Souvenir of Canada 2 (2004)
- School Spirit (2002)
- Souvenir of Canada (2002)
- City of Glass (2000) (updated version 2010)
- Polaroids from the Dead (1996)

=== Drama and screenplays ===
- All Families Are Psychotic (2009) Announced on 9 February 2016, based on the novel of the same name.
- jPod (2008) (TV series) Premiered January 8, 2008 on CBC]. Canceled on March 7, 2008. Final airing April 4, 2008.
- Everything's Gone Green (2007)
- Souvenir of Canada (2005) (writing and narration)
- September 10 (2004)
- Douglas Coupland: Close Personal Friend (1996)

== Criticism and interpretation ==
=== Essays ===
- Doody, Christopher. "X-plained: The Production and Reception History of Douglas Coupland’s Generation X." Papers of the Bibliographical Society of Canada 49.1 (2011): 5–34.
- Jensen, Mikkel. "Miss(ed) Generation: Douglas Coupland’s Miss Wyoming. Culture Unbound 3 (2011): 455–474.
- McCampbell, Mary. "GOD IS NOWHERE. GOD IS NOW HERE: The Co-existence of Hope and Evil in Douglas Coupland's Hey Nostradamus. Yearbook of English Studies 39.1 (2009): 137–154.
- Dalton-Brown, Sally. "The Dialectics of Emptiness: Douglas Coupland's and Viktor Pelevin's Tales of Generation X and P." Forum for Modern Language Studies 42.3 (2006): 239–48.
- Steen, Marc. "Reading Microserfs : A story of research and development as a search for identity." Proceedings of SCOS 2005 Conference (Stockholm, 8–10 July 2005): 220–232.
- Katerberg, William H. "Western Myth and the End of History in the Novels of Douglas Coupland." Western American Literature 40.3 (2005): 272–99.
- Tate, Andrew. "'Now-here is My Secret': Ritual and Epiphany in Douglas Coupland's Fiction." Literature & Theology: An International Journal of Religion, Theory, and Culture 16.3 (2002): 326–38.
- Forshaw, Mark. "Douglas Coupland: In and Out of 'Ironic Hell'." Critical Survey 12.3 (2000): 39–58.
- McGill, Robert. "The Sublime Simulacrum: Vancouver in Douglas Coupland's Geography of Apocalypse." Essays on Canadian Writing 70 (2000): 252–76.
- McCampbell, Mary. "Consumer in a Coma: Douglas Coupland's Rewriting of the Contemporary Apocalypse" in Spiritual Identities: Literature and the Post-Secular Imagination . Eds. Arthur Bradley, Jo *Carruthers, and Andrew Tate.

=== Books ===
- Zurbrigg, Terri Susan. X = What? Douglas Coupland, Generation X, and the Politics of Postmodern Irony. VDM Verlag, 2008.
- Giles, Paul. The Global Remapping of American Literature. Princeton University Press, 2011 [contains discussion incorporating City of Glass, Generation X, Shampoo Planet, Polaroids from the Dead, Microserfs, Girlfriend in a Coma, Miss Wyoming, and J-Pod].
- Hutchinson, Colin. Reaganism, Thatcherism and the Social Novel. Palgrave Macmillan., 2008 [contains sections covering Generation X, Shampoo Planet, and Microserfs].
- Tate, Andrew. Douglas Coupland. Manchester: Manchester University Press, 2007 [emphasis on religious elements].
- Grassian, Daniel. Hybrid Fictions: American Literature and Generation X. McFarland & Co Inc, 2003 [contains lengthy discussion of Microserfs ].

== See also ==
- Postmodern literature
