= All Families Are Psychotic =

2001 novel by Douglas Coupland

- Author: Douglas Coupland
- Language: English
- Genre: Novel
- Publisher: Random House of Canada (Canada), Bloomsbury (UK)
- Publication date: 2001
- Publication place: Canada
- Media type: Print (hardback, paperback)
- Pages: 279 pp (Fortieth anniversary edition)
- ISBN: 0-679-31140-8 (first edition, hardback)
- OCLC: 46702989
- Preceded by: Miss Wyoming
- Followed by: Hey Nostradamus!

All Families Are Psychotic is the seventh novel by Douglas Coupland, published in 2001. The novel is the fictional story of the dysfunctional Drummond family and their adventures on a trip to see their daughter's space shuttle launch.

== Plot ==
The novel is the tale of the Drummond family from Vancouver gathering together to watch Sarah Drummond's space shuttle blast off at the Kennedy Space Center. The Drummonds are a group of misfits with a wide array of personal foibles and intricacies. The novel's plot is the tale of events that reunite the Drummond family after many years of estrangement.

Several plot points of the book include geriatric HIV, armed robbery, death in Walt Disney World, pharmaceutical drug lords, black market baby sales, Daytona Beach, and suicide attempts.

Early in the book the men of the family travel to nearby Walt Disney World where they receive a package destined for the Bahamas containing a letter written by Prince William stolen from Princess Diana's casket. The men start to travel to the Bahamas to deliver their package, but everything and anything happens to them on the way.

The novel is told in a similar style to Miss Wyoming, with many plot flashbacks. However, the focus in this novel is on the temporally linear plot.

== Characters ==
Wade Drummond
Eldest child and first son of Ted and Janet Drummond, Wade ran away from home at the age of 17 after a particularly violent encounter with his father, and proceeded to, for the next thirty or so years, wander across North America drifting from one job to the next in search of the next cheap thrill. As a result of his various encounters, Wade has contracted AIDS, and has decided to settle down, eventually marrying Beth, a woman whom he met at an STD support group. Wade rarely takes things seriously, and often teases his various family members, most notably his father Ted and brother Bryan.
Ted Drummond
Patriarch of the Drummond family and generally abusive father, Ted resented his sons, Bryan and Wade, and doted on his daughter Sarah throughout most of their respective childhoods. After separating from his first wife Janet, Ted married Nickie, a trophy wife, who, for some reason, cares deeply for him. An alcoholic, Ted can be at times charming and likable, and at others, abrasive and violent.
Janet Drummond
Matriarch of the Drummond family, and Toronto native, Janet married her husband Ted straight out of college, and, as a result, has trouble filling her days following their separation. A caring mother, Janet is deeply concerned for the well-being of her children, and often checks up on them to make sure they are all right. Janet is in her mid 60's and trying to find herself.
Bryan Drummond
The eternally depressed youngest child of Ted and Janet, Bryan has three times tried to kill himself. Finding solace in the wings of political activists and protesters, Bryan lacks focus and drifts aimlessly from cause to cause. Bryan is always the last in a room to get a joke, and has a penchant for the melodramatic. His girlfriend, also an activist, goes by the name Shw.
Sarah Drummond
The only daughter and middle child of Ted and Janet, Sarah is, without a doubt, the best-adjusted member of the Drummond family. Pursuing a career in aeronautics, Sarah became an astronaut, and is the reason for the family's reunion in Florida. Sarah has only one hand, the result of a birth defect, caused by her mother's use of thalidomide while she was carrying Sarah. Always worried for her brothers, Sarah is always the first to know if anything is wrong with either Bryan or Wade, and is the only one able to get them to talk about it.
Nickie Drummond
Ted Drummond's second wife, Nickie used to work for Mr. Drummond. Definitely at odds with Janet, they later bond over a shared medical condition. Nickie accidentally sleeps with Wade at an airport without knowing that he is legally her stepson. The realization by Ted of this encounter's step-incestuous nature causes a very large incident to occur.
Shw
Bryan's girlfriend, Shw, is the child of very hippie parents. They allowed her to choose a new name at 16, when Shw chose Shw. Her real name is a mystery for most of the novel. Shw stands for Sogetsu Hernando Watanabe, a martyred hero of the Peruvian Shining Path terrorist faction. She is pregnant with Bryan's child and has ulterior motives in the birth of the child. She has told Bryan she wants to abort the child, but this is a mask for her real intentions.
Beth Drummond
Beth is Wade's wife. She is a very religious person, a foil to Wade's crazy attitude with life. However, it seems that her religious nature may be affecting Wade's personality. She is pregnant with Wade's child after a procedure in Europe allows her to become pregnant without becoming HIV positive.

== Inspiration ==
The trigger for the book was Coupland's mother's discovery of the Internet, mirrored by Janet's discovery of the Internet in the text.

"My mother discovered the internet about two years ago. She's got this really weird medical condition which only 150 people on the planet have and she's managed to get them all together. It's transformed her as a person, she got rid of all her old friends – they're boring, they don't care about what's happening – chucked out all her clothes, shops only Banana Republic and Gap now. She's always been an interesting person but now she's interested in the world again. Watching that transformation, obviously, is the trigger for this book."

In Coupland's 1995 novel Microserfs, the narrator says about his girlfriend: "All she'll say is they are psychotic, as if everybody else's family isn't."

== History ==
The novel is one of Coupland's more popular. In its initial publication run, it was printed in two halves, glued back to back, so that one cover was upside down. The reader was forced, halfway through the novel, to turn the book upside down to continue reading. This quirk was eliminated on subsequent print runs; however, the cover still retained this peculiar arrangement in some later printings.

The original British cover, which featured a woman in a rocket ship, caused Coupland some grief, as "it misportrays the book's contents and sort of...sends the wrong message out". The original Canadian and American covers featured a Larry Sultan photograph of an older woman staring out a window through curtains.

In 2004, DreamWorks announced that a film version of All Families Are Psychotic would be released in 2006 or 2007. The project remains in development. Writer Mark Poirier was commissioned to adapt the screenplay from Coupland's novel, and Noam Murro was attached to direct.
