= Monument to the War of 1812 =

Public sculpture in Toronto, Ontario, Canada

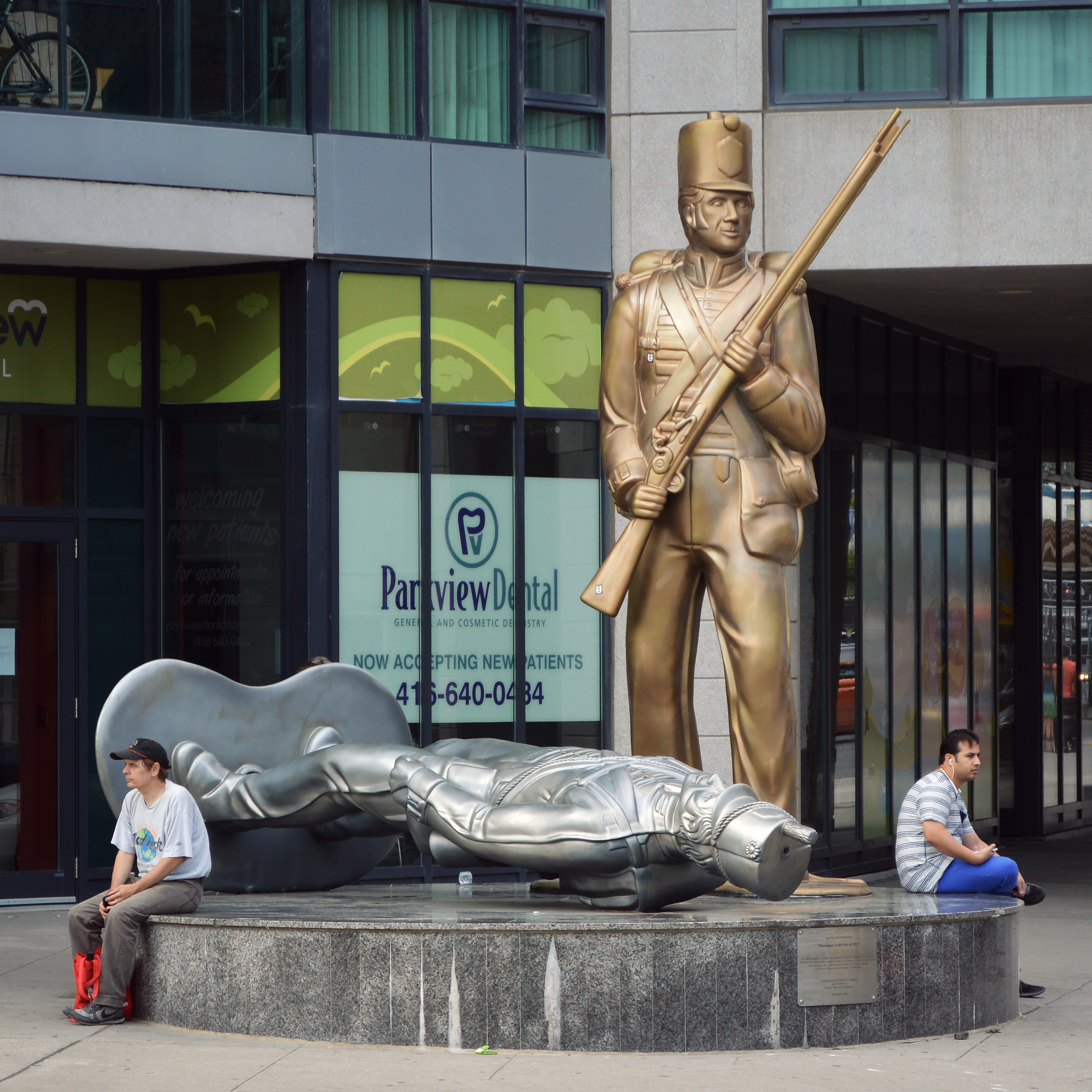
- The monument pictured in 2013
- Interactive map of Monument to the War of 1812
- Location: Toronto, Ontario, Canada
- Coordinates: 43.6367°N 79.4000°W
- Designer: Douglas Coupland
- Type: War memorial
- Material: Steel armature, plastic moulding, and foam (statues)
- Opening date: November 2008

Monument to the War of 1812, also called Toy Soldiers, is a War of 1812 war monument in Toronto, Ontario, Canada. Designed by Douglas Coupland and unveiled in 2008, the monument includes two Styrofoam sculptures over a stone plinth, and commemorates the successful defence of British North America against American forces in the War of 1812.

The sculpture is situated near the intersection of Bathurst Street and Lake Shore Boulevard in the Fort York neighbourhood, south of the historic fort, and serves as the southeastern gateway marker to the Fort York neighbourhood.

== History ==
The monument was commissioned by Malibu Investments, a real estate developer that was building a condominium adjacent to the site of the present monument at 600 Fleet Street. The monument was partly supported by the Percent for Public Art - Private Developer Program, an initiative of the municipal government of Toronto.

Several artists were approached to submit proposals for a monument in 2005. Douglas Coupland's proposal was selected and he was commissioned to conceive and design the monument, who designed it using a 3D model in Vancouver. The monument was built by Heavy Industries, a company based in Calgary. The completed monument was shipped from Calgary on an open flatbed truck and erected at the site by crane. The cost for the monument was approximately C$500,000.

The monument was unveiled in November 2008 near the intersection of Bathurst Street and Lake Shore Boulevard by Joe Pantalone, the deputy mayor of Toronto. Military re-enactors from Fort York and Adrienne Clarkson, the former governor general of Canada, were also in attendance for the unveiling ceremony.

== Design ==
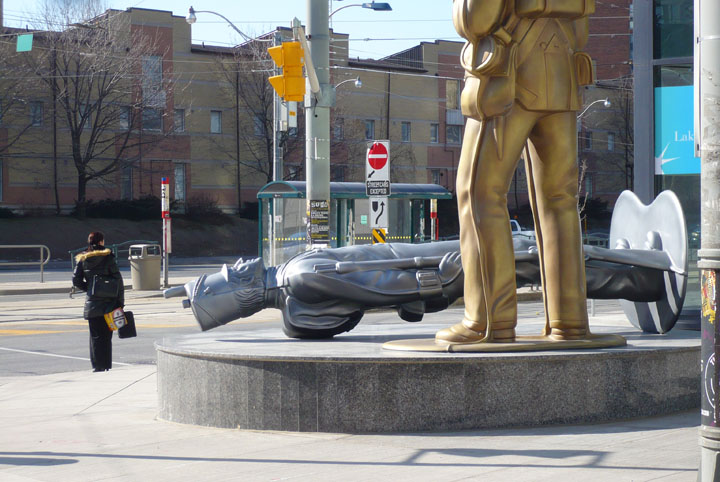
The monument features a silver-coloured soldier of the 16th U.S. Infantry Regiment toppled in front a gold-coloured soldier of the Royal Newfoundland Regiment Fencible Infantry.

The monument features a 60-centimetre-high (24 in) stone base, with a gold and silver soldier, each standing at a height of 4 metres (13 ft), atop the base. The structure is made out of styrofoam over a steel armature. The gold soldier depicts a member of the Royal Newfoundland Regiment Fencible Infantry, and stands erect and alert, grasping his rifle. The silver soldier lies toppled on the ground in front of the gold soldier, and depicts a soldier from the 16th U.S. Infantry Regiment. (Note: The Royal Newfoundland Regiment of Fencible Infantry's lineage is perpetuated by the Royal Newfoundland Regiment. The 16th Infantry refers to a unit constituted in 1812, and was consolidated with several other units to form 2nd Infantry Regiment in 1815.) The pristine surface and colours make the sculptures appear as toy soldiers.

=== Symbolism and reception ===
The monument commemorates the successful defence of British North America against US invasion during the War of 1812. Coupland was motivated to create the statue after seeing, in his opinion, American "creeping revisionism" about the outcome of the war, with some Americans claiming that they had "won that," or that they "didn't lose". In designing the sculpture, Coupland wanted to evoke a "quick haiku moment" for those passing by to think about the War of 1812.

The monument received more attention than usual when it was unveiled, as the design strongly emphasized Canadian victory against the United States during the war. Reception for the design included approving editorials from The Globe and Mail. However, the monument was criticized by Now for ignoring the role First Nations played in the defence of British North America.

== See also ==
- Canadian war memorials
- Victoria Memorial Square, a public square in Toronto with another War of 1812 monument
