= Digital Orca =

Sculpture by Douglas Coupland in Vancouver, British Columbia, Canada

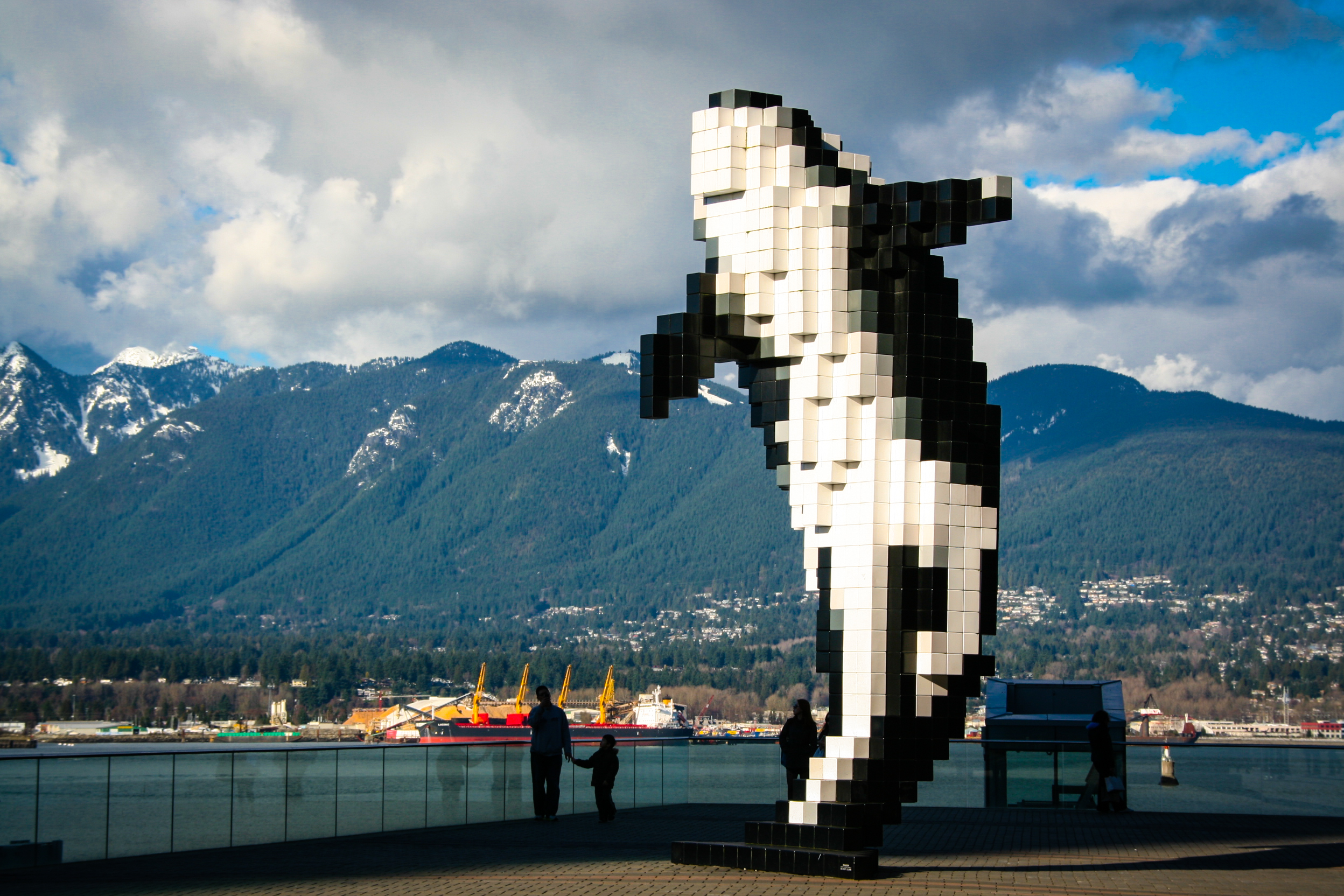
- The sculpture in 2013
- Artist: Douglas Coupland
- Year: 2009
- Medium: Aluminium; stainless steel
- Subject: Killer whale
- Dimensions: 8 m (25 ft)
- Location: Vancouver, British Columbia, Canada; 49.28977°N 123.11679°W
- Owner: Pavco

Digital Orca is a 2009 sculpture of a killer whale by Douglas Coupland, installed next to the Vancouver Convention Centre in Vancouver, British Columbia, Canada. The powder coated aluminium sculpture on a stainless steel frame is owned by Pavco, a crown corporation of British Columbia which operates BC Place Stadium and the Vancouver Convention Centre.

== History ==
The sculpture was installed in 2009 and commissioned by the city of Vancouver.

In 2022, a group protesting the logging of old-growth forests in British Columbia spray painted landmarks around Vancouver, including Digital Orca.

== Description ==
The sculpture is located at Jack Poole Plaza in Vancouver, Canada. The sculpture depicts a killer whale created by black and white cubes, creating a visual effect as if it were a pixellated digital image. The sculpture has a steel armature and aluminum cladding.

== Reception ==
It was described as "both beautiful and bizarre" in Architectural Design. John Ortved in Vogue said the statue "grapples with modernization and the digital age" by making the killer whale less scary.

== See also ==
- 2009 in art
