= Worst. Person. Ever. =

2013 novel by Douglas Coupland

- Author: Douglas Coupland
- Language: English
- Genre: Novel
- Publisher: Random House of Canada
- Publication date: 2013
- Publication place: Canada
- Media type: Print (hardback)
- ISBN: 978-0345813732 (first edition, hardback)
- Preceded by: Player One

Worst. Person. Ever. is the fourteenth novel by Douglas Coupland, published in 2013. The novel is the story of Raymond Gunt, an offensive and shocking narrator, and his journey from London through Los Angeles to Kiribati, an island in the Pacific Ocean, where he is to work on a reality television show.

== Plot ==
Raymond Gunt's journey begins in London, where in a meeting with his ex-wife, Fiona, she offers Raymond a job as a B-Unit cameraman on a reality TV show titled Survival. While preparing to leave for this journey, he befriends and hires a homeless man named Neal as an assistant, and prepares himself to deal with a British/American culture clash.

From this point in the novel, Raymond Gunt's journey is one of offense, crassness, and shock. He travels to Hawaii, then to Los Angeles, with each moment of his journey being rife with strife, mostly of his creation. The characters reflect on this cultural clash between the United States and Britain, and the trouble they get into because of it. Raymond also finds Sarah, his love interest. From there, Raymond and Neal leave for Kiribati, after a run-in with the American military.

Raymond and Neal arrive in Kiribati to begin filming the reality TV series, while the world around them has degraded into a state of turmoil, which may or may not be their fault. International incidents play out while the characters explore the island. As world events spiral out of control, Raymond, his friends, and his family react and respond to the world changing around them.

== Characters ==
Raymond Gunt
The novel's narrator, Raymond is a freelance cameraman from Britain, who has been offered a job at a faraway Pacific island. He is a self-described "reasonable enough citizen", however, the author describes him as "a living, walking, talking, hot steaming pile of pure id" on the book jacket. Raymond is an example of an unreliable narrator. As a narrator, Raymond Gunt constantly explains how he is not at fault for the events he recounts. His abrasive and offensive language juxtaposed with these attempts at humility create this unreliable nature. Raymond Gunt also has a Twitter feed at @RaymondGunt.
Fiona (Fi)
Raymond's ex-wife, Fiona owns a casting agency that offers Raymond his job in Kiribati. Fiona has been living a lesbian lifestyle, which she describes as "growing as a person". She acts as a foil to Raymond; she uses similar offensive language to Raymond, but she is unapologetic for her actions. While Raymond is constantly defending himself, Fiona is defiantly offensive. Fiona's assistant is Tabitha.
Neal Crossley
A British homeless man, with strong sex appeal, whom Raymond hires as an assistant for his trip to Kiribati. Neal is Raymond's sidekick, similar to Sancho Panza's role in Don Quixote. Whenever Raymond gets into trouble, it is Neal who is there when Raymond recovers. Neal also dresses similarly to musicians in bands of the 1980s, in particular, Duran Duran.
Sarah
Sarah is Raymond's love interest, Stuart's girlfriend, and a part of the crew for Survival. She is described as someone who "handles the people for the US network".
Stuart Greene
Stuart is in charge of the filming of Survival in Kiribati. He is Sarah's boyfriend. He would also count as Raymond's primary competition in the pursuit of Sarah.

== Reception ==
The Scotsman described Worst as "profoundly bleak", while the Washington Post called it "scabrously hilarious" and "an erupting Vesuvius of abuse and profanity". The A.V. Club stated that it was "essentially an extended shaggy-dog story", and the Financial Times said that the "plot is a cavalcade of more or less random events", but emphasized that it "succeeds by its verbal energy, the brio of its invention, the snappiness with which successive gags and ever more appalling atrocities are piled on."
