= Terry (book) =

Book by Douglas Coupland

- The book's cover
- Author: Douglas Coupland
- Genre: Pictorial biography
- Publisher: Douglas & McIntyre
- Publication date: 2005
- Publication place: Canada
- Pages: 176
- ISBN: 1-55365-113-8

Terry is a pictorial biography of Terry Fox written by Canadian author Douglas Coupland. It was published by the Canadian publishing house Douglas & McIntyre in 2005 to commemorate the 25th anniversary of Fox's death.

== Overview ==
Written with the support of the Fox family, Terry reflects the minimalist style of Douglas Coupland’s Souvenir of Canada projects. Succinct narrative sections frame some 150 photographs, many of which are previously-unpublished images and memorabilia from the Fox family archives. The book presents Fox’s life, his Marathon of Hope, and his immediate and continuing resonance with the Canadian public. Coupland donates the full royalties from the book to the Terry Fox Foundation in support of cancer research.

== Structure ==
Terry is arranged as a pictorial record of the life and influence of Terry Fox, using the family album or scrapbook as its artistic model. Coupland applies an economy of narrative to give the images, letters, and photography an increased biographical force. Arranged into brief sections that each service two or three pages of photography, Coupland’s narrative presents Fox as an unexceptional suburban Canadian accomplishing an exceptional thing. This artistic decision allows Coupland to demonstrate, at times explicitly, that Fox's heroism is similarly available to any otherwise ordinary person.

== Coda ==
In addition to the funds that it raised for the Terry Fox Foundation, Coupland’s book contributed to the sustained memory and public legacy of the athlete and humanitarian. It is, for instance, credited with having led to the discovery of the van, a 1980 Ford Econoline, in which Fox and his brother lived during the cross-Canada marathon.

Terry endures as a public window into the relics and memorabilia of the Marathon of Hope which Coupland sifted through by the thousands for the items formed into the completed book.
