= The Gum Thief =

2007 novel by Douglas Coupland

- Author: Douglas Coupland
- Language: English
- Genre: Epistolary novel
- Publisher: Random House Canada
- Publication date: September 25, 2007
- Publication place: Canada
- Media type: Print (Hardback)
- Pages: 288 pp (first edition, hardback)
- ISBN: 978-0-307-35628-4 (first edition, hardback)
- Preceded by: JPod
- Followed by: Generation A

The Gum Thief is Canadian author Douglas Coupland's twelfth novel. It was published on September 25, 2007, by Random House Canada in Canada and Bloomsbury Publishing in the United States.

An epistolary novel, The Gum Thief is written as a collection of journal entries, notes, and letters written by various characters. Among these are regular installments of the characters in Roger's novella, titled Glove Pond.

A special boxed edition was also released including a special hardback edition signed by Coupland, as well as a hardback copy of the Glove Pond novella by "Roger Thorpe." The jacket for Glove Pond features a pull-quote written by Douglas Coupland.

== Plot summary ==
Roger and Bethany

The primary plot of this novel involves two characters, Roger and Bethany, employees of a Staples in North Vancouver, British Columbia, Canada. The two characters come from very different walks of life. Roger, a middle-aged alcoholic, is coping with an ugly divorce from his wife and the loss of access to his child. Bethany, a goth girl, is dealing with coming of age and working in what Coupland referred to in his 1991 novel Generation X as a McJob.

What brings the characters together is a journal that Roger has decided to keep. In the journal, Roger begins to discuss his issues and his pressing thoughts, including a novel he would like to write called "Glove Pond." Bethany finds this journal, and writes a letter to Roger. In the letter, Bethany says they should continue to write to each other, but to pretend that they know nothing about each other outside of the letters themselves at work. After writing letters back and forth, Roger and Bethany strike up a friendship in the letters.

Soon, more letters are included in the book from other characters, for instance, from Bethany's mother, DeeDee, who went out on a date with Roger, and also went to high school with him. Other letters include a letter from Roger's wife, emails from employees within the store, and more.

Interspersed within the main text is the novel within the novel: Glove Pond. As Roger begins to write Glove Pond, different characters in the novel respond to his writing in their letters. The Glove Pond sections are interspersed within the other letters.

Glove Pond

Excerpts of Glove Pond are scattered throughout the book, presumably appearing as Roger writes them. Glove Pond is a corruption of Edward Albee's 1962 play, Who's Afraid of Virginia Woolf? It concerns the two main characters, a couple named Steve and Gloria, and their dinner guests, Steve's younger colleague, Kyle Falconcrest, and his wife Brittany, a surgeon.

Roger writes in his diary that Glove Pond was supposed to contain characters such as Elizabeth Taylor and Richard Burton—drunk movie stars who engage in witty repartee. This is a fairly accurate description of Steve and Gloria, who are, in fact, a pair of penniless alcoholics living in a dusty, neglected home. The plot of Glove Pond follows the dinner interactions between these characters.

A reference to Glove Pond is seen in a short scene in the final episode of the TV adaptation of Coupland's jPod. The character of Jim Jarlewski (Alan Thicke) is seen reading a hardcover copy of Glove Pond by Roger Thorpe.

== Characters ==
Main Plot

Roger
Roger is a middle-aged 'aisles associate' at Staples. He is bitter and depressed after a recent divorce and firing from his job at an insurance firm. He begins a friendship with co-worker Bethany after she reads his journal, where he has written a character sketch pretending to be her. He also begins working on a novella, Glove Pond.
Bethany
An unhappy mid-twenties goth, who lives with her mother, DeeDee. Bethany also works at Staples, and she is in charge of restocking aisles 2-North and 2-South. After reading Roger's diary, she writes back, and the two begin an epistolary friendship.
Deedee
Bethany's thrice-divorced mother and Roger's old schoolmate. She is mainly concerned with her daughter's unclear ambitions and wants her to go to college.

Glove Pond

Steve
One of the main characters in Roger's novella Glove Pond. He is married to Gloria, and is a novelist himself, having written five poorly selling novels, and is also the head of the English department at a "large, prestigious university." Steve is an alcoholic, mainly drinking scotch.
Gloria
Another character from Glove Pond. She is Steve's wife, and, like Steve, an alcoholic. Largely self-absorbed and obsessed with her personal appearance, she is a minor actress, playing Lady Windermere in a local production of Lady Windermere's Fan.

Glove Pond has characters that revolve around Roger's life situations. Since Roger is unable to tell his story straight to Bethany he uses the characters of Glove Pond to write about his stand in situations he has been through.

== Inspiration ==
Setting

The Staples location that inspired The Gum Thief is located at the corner of Capilano and Marine Drive, in North Vancouver, British Columbia

"There's a Staples that I go to in North Vancouver at the corner of Capilano and Marine Drive. It's in this building that, when I was in high school, had the chic-est apartments in town and a disco. Margaret Trudeau came to christen the disco. For a brief three-week window, North Van was the place to be. The disco's long gone. The building now looks like the third-best hotel in the second-biggest city in Poland; it's just this concrete hulk, and some of the windows are covered in tinfoil."

— Coupland on the Staples location.

Epistolary Format

The novel is in the epistolary format; that is, it is written as a collection of letters. Coupland chose this format because of the strength of voice within the written letter.

"Part of the fun of this book, in doing it, was experimenting with notions of writing itself," he says. "And you always kind of have to worry about that. You can get generically PoMo about it, and you don't want that. But there's a very truthful voice you get from letter-writing. Not email writing, but writing-writing. And in long-form fiction, I think you have to have that – that sense of truth."

— Coupland on the voice of a letter.

== History of the novel ==
The Gum Thief has been selected for a number of honours. It is a Globe and Mail Best Book, and a New York Times Editor's pick. The novel was advertised through a series of award-winning video clips by a Toronto-based graphic design and production studio, Crush Inc.
