= God Hates Japan =

Novel by Douglas Coupland

- Author: Douglas Coupland
- Language: English
- Publication date: 2001

God Hates Japan (神は日本を憎んでる, Kami wa Nihon wo Nikunderu, in Japanese) is a 2001 novel by Douglas Coupland. It was released solely in Japan and has little English text in it. The book was published by Kadokawa Shoten and illustrated by Michael Howatson.

The story focuses on characters lost in the malaise that swept Japanese culture after the economic downturn in the late 1980s and early 1990s. It also depicts the way some of these characters lived in the shadow of the 1995 sarin gas attack on the Tokyo subway.
