= The Age of Earthquakes =

2015 book by Shumon Basar, Douglas Coupland and Hans Ulrich Obrist

The Age of Earthquakes: A Guide to the Extreme Present
- First edition (US)
- Authors: Shumon Basar; Douglas Coupland; Hans Ulrich Obrist
- Illustrator: Wayne Daly
- Language: English
- Publisher: Penguin Books (UK); Blue Rider Press (US)
- Publication date: March 5, 2015 (UK); March 3, 2015 (US)
- Publication place: United Kingdom
- Media type: Print (paperback) and digital (ebook)
- Pages: 256 pp
- ISBN: 978-0-141-97956-4

The Age of Earthquakes: A Guide to the Extreme Present is a book written by British writer and curator Shumon Basar, Canadian writer and artist Douglas Coupland, and Swiss curator Hans Ulrich Obrist. It was published in 2015 by Penguin Books in the UK, Blue Rider Press in the U.S. and Eichborn in Germany.

== Summary ==
Modelled around the influential 1967 paperback The Medium is the Massage, by Marshall McLuhan, Quentin Fiore and Jerome Agel — which was first published by Penguin Books in the UK — The Age of Earthquakes updates McLuhan's prophetic 20th century pronouncements to the Internet addled, 21st century. "The unpredictable side effects of technology are what dictate the future – there is always an excess to what we invent," say Basar/Coupland/Obrist, "we would argue that it's those excess effects... that produce the most radical – and also sometimes most unsettling – moral, philosophical, social and cultural transformations." The book's abiding premise, therefore, is that, "We haven't just changed our brains these past few years. We've changed the structure of the planet".

== Design ==
The Age of Earthquakes is directly inspired by Quentin Fiore's experimental style he made famous in The Medium is the Massage. For The Age of Earthquakes, graphic designer Wayne Daly took familiar visual cues from contemporary apps and other screen based matter, and translated them onto the printed page, in stark black and white. The text — written and collated by Basar/Coupland/Obrist — appears as aphoristic phrases and quotes. Some pages are left blank, while others require the reader to rotate the book 90 degrees, reminiscent of the portrait/horizontal modes on mobile phones. The reading experience emulates what Fiore achieved with The Medium is the Massage: to create "a dialogue between the computer and the book."

== Visual contributors ==
Most of the images in the book were generated from a process entitled "mindsourcing." The manuscript was sent to 35 artists, from all over the world, some born after 1989, several born before 1945, who were asked to respond with relevant visual work.

They are Farah Al Qasimi, Ed Atkins, Gabriele Basilico, Alessandro Bava, Josh Bitelli, James Bridle, Cao Fei, Alex Mackin Dolan, Thomas Dozol, Constant Dullaart, Cécile B. Evans, Rami Farook, Hans-Peter Feldmann, GCC, Liam Gillick, Dominique Gonzalez-Foerster, Eloise Hawser, Camille Henrot, Hu Fang, K-Hole, Koo Jeong-A, Katja Novitskova, Lara Ogel, Trevor Paglen, Yuri Pattison, Jon Rafman, Bunny Rogers, Bogosi Sekhukhuni, Taryn Simon, Hito Steyerl, Michael Stipe, Rosemarie Trockel, Amalia Ulman, David Weir and Trevor Yeung.

== Reception ==
Pacific Standard magazine described it as "a kind of philosophical Anarchist Cookbook for the online era"; Jon Snow on Channel 4 News called it "absolutely amazing"; Vice.com characterised it as "a new philosophy-cum-modern-self-help book"; and Dazed said it was a "guidebook, map for today and mediation on the madness of our media, it's an awesome, dizzying read." However, The Los Angeles Times accused it of being, "a project that looks backward, rather than ahead,"; and Kirkus Reviews said, "its hipper-than-thou self-satisfaction runs close to the surface of a superficial book." Jarvis Cocker dedicated one of his last BBC Radio 6 Music Sunday Service programs to The Age of Earthquakes. Cocker interviewed Basar and Coupland, in a montage of music and words that echoed the experience of the book.
