= Polaroids from the Dead =

- First edition
- Author: Douglas Coupland
- Language: English
- Publisher: HarperCollins Canada
- Publication date: 1996
- Publication place: Canada
- Media type: Print (hardback & paperback)
- Pages: 198
- Preceded by: Microserfs
- Followed by: Girlfriend in a Coma

Polaroids from the Dead is a collection of short stories and essays by Douglas Coupland. The theme is that each story is written from a collection of old Polaroid photographs that Coupland found in a drawer. It is an attempt to describe the 1990s, a decade that "seemed to be living in a 1980s hangover". Topics of the stories include a Grateful Dead concert (source of "The Dead" in title), a post-mortem letter to Kurt Cobain, Vancouver's Lions Gate Bridge, and an homage to James Rosenquist's painting F-111. The book's ends with a longer essay on Brentwood, California, home to Marilyn Monroe's grave, and the O. J. Simpson murder case. The essay is in part a collage of menus, scraps of conversation, and postings from bulletin boards.

== Synopsis ==
The book is split into three parts. The first part is Polaroids from the Dead, which is a collection of short stories inspired by a series of Grateful Dead concerts. The second is Portraits of People and Places, which is a collection of essays about people and places, including a letter to Kurt Cobain and a discussion of the Lions Gate Bridge. The last part is called “Brentwood Notebook” and is a discussion of Brentwood, California, a suburb of Los Angeles. It is also where Marilyn Monroe died, and where Nicole Brown Simpson was murdered.

=== Part One: Polaroids from the Dead ===
The first part contains ten fictional stories. They have titles like “The 1960s Are Disneyland”, and "T or F: Self-Perfection Is Attainable Within Your Lifetime." The stories focus on both young and old characters and their experiences with Grateful Dead concerts. Interspersed within the text are large, full-page images of the Polaroids that inspired the story. Other images include a picture of Sharon Tate and Charles Manson, in reference to their mention in a story. This section was originally published in a slightly different form in Spin Magazine, in April 1992.

List of Chapters

1. The 1960s Are Disneyland
2. You Are Afraid of the Smell of Shit
3. You are Exhausted by Risk
4. T or F: Self-Perfection Is Attainable Within Your Lifetime
5. Tinkering with Oblivion Carries Risks
6. You Don’t Own Your Body
7. You Fear Involuntary Sedation
8. You Can’t Remember What you Chose to Forget
9. Technology Will Spare Us the Tedium of Repeating history
10. How Clear Is Your Vision of Heaven?

=== Part Two: Portraits of People and Places ===
This section includes multiple essays and letters on a variety of topics. This section is nonfiction, excluding the last story. Some essays are recollections of places and events in Coupland's life, such as an article on the Lions Gate Bridge, or a story about a visiting German reporter. Some are told as postcard recollections of places Coupland has visited. Others are essays about people, such as a letter to Kurt Cobain. The last piece is a collection of microstories about the 1992 American election's Super Tuesday. Many of these essays were published in other publications, such as Spin, Vancouver Magazine, Tempo, Artforum, and The New Republic. The essays appeared in slightly different forms.

List of Chapters

11. Lions Gate Bridge, Vancouver, B.C., Canada: Originally published in Vancouver Magazine under the name “This Bridge Is Ours”
12. The German Reporter: Originally published in Tempo
13. Postcard from the Former East Berlin (Circus Envy)
14. Letter to Kurt Cobain: Originally published in The Washington Post
15. Harolding in West Vancouver: Originally published in The New Republic in February 1994
16. Two Postcards from the Bahamas.
17. Postcard from Palo Alto: Originally published in The New Republic in May 1994.
18. James Rosenquist’s F-111 (F-One Eleven): Originally published in Artforum in April 1994.
19. Postcard from Los Almos (Acid Canyon) : Originally published in The New Republic in May 1994.
20. Washington, D.C.: Four Microstories, Super Tuesday 1992

=== Part Three: Brentwood Notebook ===
This part is a long extended essay discussing Brentwood, Los Angeles, California. The essay is broken down into a chronological time periods, spanning a day from Morning, to Afternoon to Late Afternoon. The essay follows Brentwood from its inception to its notoriety with the death of Marilyn Monroe and the murders of Nicole Brown Simpson and Ron Goldman. It also discusses the idea of post-fame, when fame becomes a liability to the famous. The essay incorporates information off billboards and menus into its text, including interesting historical documents as well. Portions of Brentwood Notebook was published in The New Republic in December 1994.

== Inspiration ==
Coupland discusses his influences in writing this book in the introduction called “Kitchen Drawer Filled with Photos”. He discusses the stories from the past that he collected in this book. The stories in the Polaroids section were experienced at a series of Grateful Dead concerts in December 1991. Jerry Garcia had already died when the book was published in 1996.

“This book is mainly an examination of people and places I found fascinating (for whatever reasons we develop fascinations) during” the period from 1991 to 1994.

— Coupland on Polaroids focus

The Super Tuesday stories were researched by Coupland during the Super Tuesday primaries in 1992.

The Brentwood Notebook was written in 1994 over the course of one day on the thirty-second anniversary of Marilyn Monroe's death. It was also months after the murders of Nicole Brown Simpson and Ron Goldman. It was to be written a year before in a style like the Palo Alto article; however, Coupland lacked a hook for the story.
