= Souvenir of Canada =

2002 book by Douglas Coupland

- Author: Douglas Coupland
- Language: English
- Genre: Non-fiction
- Publication date: 2002
- Publication place: Canada

Souvenir of Canada is a 2002 book written by Canadian author Douglas Coupland. A feature film based on the book was released theatrically in 2006.

In the book's introduction, Coupland states his intention was to author a book about Canada "that only Canadians would get." Souvenir of Canada is thus a book that is a bit about fairly obscure Canadian cultural matters, many of which reflect the author's own experiences growing up as a Canadian.

Arranged alphabetically with some artistic exceptions, the book is a collection of essays on uniquely Canadian experiences and objects, such as bilingualism, Anglophilia, beer bottles, cigarette warning labels, Kraft macaroni and cheese, and the Trans-Canada Highway. Each item is given a witty summary by Coupland, often drawing on personal anecdotes. Most also feature a unique photographic illustration, either through stock footage or an original photo by Coupland himself.

Though much of the book mocks Canadian nationalism and various national myths of Canada, Coupland states that he still considers himself patriotic. In analyzing various mundane items his intent is to show "another side" of Canadian culture that is less glamorous, but "still a part of who we are."

== Titles ==
The titles of the essays are, in order:

Baffin Island Canada™ Canuck? Capitaine Crounche Cheeseheads Chimo Chocolate Cigs Clans CN Tower DEW Line Doug Distance England Flies 49th Parallel FLQG8FTAA911 French Group of Seven	…Game Show Host …Bimbette … Songbird Headlights Hockey Inuksuit Invasion the Kitty Luggage as a grand prize Los Angeles The Maple Leaf Miss Canada Maple-Walnut Ice Cream Money Newfoundland* 1971 Nowhere = Anywhere One Billion Years Ookpik Piss Vinegar	Poutine Power Broker Railway Reserves Rapeseed, Zinc & Cod Rye Stubbies Small Towns Suburbia 222’s Them Trans-Canada Highway Water Wild Young Country The Yukon Zed

== Souvenir of Canada 2 ==

In 2004 a sequel was released, Souvenir of Canada 2. It largely copied the format of the original, profiling new cultural artifacts. It also featured a photo essay on "Canada House," an abandoned pre-fabricated home in Vancouver that Coupland had decorated with sculptures and furniture made of items he considered to be quintessentially Canadian. Photographed by Martin Tessler.

The second book deviates from the format of the first book by featuring more photographs, fewer essays, and the large essay on Canada House. For instance, the Oka article is told without an essay, but as a footnote to two pictures.

=== Canada House ===
Canada House was an art installation in Vancouver, British Columbia, that was built into a 1950s CMHC House. The house was gutted of items, and painted entirely white, including the fireplace, the roof, the floor, and all fixtures.

Coupland, also a trained sculptor, created many different art installations for the house, which embody Canadian experiences, memories and ideals. For instance, he built a sofa called the "Treaty Couch" which had a large seating area upholstered with red plaid, with a very small seat which was upholstered with the pattern of a cowichan sweater.

Canada House was constructed in November 2003, and took two weeks to set up. The installation was open for five days. The construction and the days the installation were open are featured in the film adaptation, Souvenir of Canada. The installation was then moved to Toronto for a brief exhibition before reaching its final destination in the Canadian Embassy in London, England.

=== Titles ===
Big Country Border Canadian Shield Canola CMHC Houses Eaton’s Energy Fish Guns & Ammo Halifax Gitchigumi GST	Hardware Hooch Canada House Kitchen Moose Oirland Oka Plywood Reach for the Top Royal Conservatory Scary Bank Calendar	Shocked & Appalled St. Pierre et Miquelon Sudbury Terry Fox Toronto Treeplanters War Who Do You Think You Are? Y?? Yanks Zut! Zzzzzzzz ... ... the Sleepy Little Dominion

== Film adaptation ==

The feature film adaptation of the book, also entitled Souvenir of Canada, is a humorous and candid portrait of Coupland who is filmed while creating his art installation "Canada House". The film has a much larger biographical focus than the books, with interviews with both Coupland’s parents, family, and friends. The film also addresses the most revealing and touching biographical moments from the books, with actors playing the part of Coupland as a youth and his father as a youth.

The film was directed by Robin Neinstein and interweaves essays from the book visualized imaginatively through animation, dramatic scenes and old stock footage. The film premiered at the Toronto International Film Festival and US Comedy Arts Festival and was produced by Media Headquarters Film & Television and the National Film Board of Canada. It is distributed by Maple Pictures.

== Design ==
The format of this book is derived from Coupland’s book, City of Glass. The book’s design was mostly done by Jen Eby, with City of Glass as the model. His 2005 book Terry, about Terry Fox, is also heavily derivative of the City of Glass/Souvenir of Canada format.
