= Hey Nostradamus! =

Novel by Douglas Coupland

- Paperback edition cover
- Author: Douglas Coupland
- Language: English
- Genre: Novel
- Publisher: Bloomsbury USA
- Publication date: July 2, 2004
- Publication place: Canada
- Media type: Print (Hardcover & Paperback)
- Pages: 244 pp
- ISBN: 1-58234-415-9
- OCLC: 55055459
- Dewey Decimal: 813/.54 22
- LC Class: PS3553.O855 H49 2004
- Preceded by: All Families Are Psychotic
- Followed by: Eleanor Rigby

Hey Nostradamus! is a novel by Douglas Coupland centred on a fictional 1988 school shooting in suburban Vancouver, British Columbia and its aftermath. It was first published by Random House of Canada in 2003. The novel comprises four first-person narratives, each from the perspective of a character directly or indirectly affected by the shooting. The novel intertwines substantial themes, including adolescent love, sex, religion, prayer and grief.

== Plot synopsis ==
The novel follows the stories of victims of a fictional school shooting in North Vancouver in 1988. Coupland has expressed his concern that the killers of the Columbine High School massacre received more focus than the victims; this is his story about the victims of tragedy. The novel is told in four parts, each with a different narrator and focus.

=== 1988: Cheryl ===
Cheryl Anway, the seventeen-year-old victim of a shooting massacre at her high school at Delbrook Senior Secondary, recounts her life from a liminal state where she is dead but can still hear the prayers and curses of those who are alive.

Cheryl was pregnant, having recently consummated her relationship with her long-term boyfriend, Jason, after they married in Las Vegas. Cheryl and Jason are members of a group of young Christians.

During the shooting, Cheryl is trapped under a table in the cafeteria. While the killers make their way through the crowd, one of them decides that he has had enough of the killing and wants to stop. The other killers decide that he has become weak, and kill him. They then turn their attention to Cheryl and her friends, and Cheryl becomes the final casualty. Before Cheryl is murdered, she witnesses Jason killing one of the gunman with a rock, enabling the other students to subdue and kill the final gunman.

=== 1999: Jason ===
Eleven years after the massacre, Jason struggles to cope with life. He writes a letter to his twin nephews, born after the death of his older brother, Kent.

Jason works as a carpenter with no true friends, frequently drinking and occasionally blacking out. He reveals that after he killed one of the school shooters, his father Reg was angry with him and his alcoholic mother left Reg. Jason was investigated by the police and was devastated when his Christian friends and Cheryl's family turn against him. He is eventually cleared and his mother takes him to New Brunswick to recuperate.

During one of his present-day drinking binges, Jason blacks out and comes to in an isolated location aware that he is about to be murdered by Yorgos, a friend of his boss. Jason defends himself and is able to escape from Yorgos; rather than kill him, however, Jason leaves him injured and sends help to him.

At the end of his letter, Jason reveals to his nephews that after Kent died, his widow Barb asked Jason to impregnate her so that she could pass the child off as Kent's. Jason agreed under the condition that Barb marry him; they did so in Las Vegas, mimicking the conditions under which he married Cheryl. During their trip to Vegas, they are spotted by an acquaintance whom Barb later murders to protect her secret. Nine months later the twins are born.

=== 2002: Heather ===
A court reporter, Heather is in distress after her boyfriend Jason goes missing.

She receives a call from a woman named Allison claiming to be a fake psychic who has had a real vision. Allison uses a secret language that is personal to Heather and Jason, making Heather believe that Jason is trying to contact her.

Despite claiming not to want money, Allison begins to extort money from Heather to pass on her messages. Heather decides to try to track down Allison and learns she is named Cecilia. She sees Cecilia with a young woman with whom she believes Jason had been having an affair. When Heather confronts the woman, she reveals she is Cecilia's daughter. Her mother came to know of the secret language because Jason came to her with detailed notes, wanting to pass along the information if he ever went missing.

Heather is left wondering about Jason's past, unaware that his decision was prompted by a chance meeting with Yorgos.

=== 2003: Reg ===
Reg writes an open letter to his son, lamenting that he was a harsh and abusive father under the guise of being a Christian for most of Jason's childhood.

Reg repents of the way he treated both Jason and Kent, and regrets that he destroyed his relationship with a woman named Ruth because he would not divorce Jason's mother. He reveals that though Jason is still missing the RCMP located a shirt of his in the woods and Reg plans to post copies of his letter to trees hoping that somehow Jason will be able to read it.

== Characters ==
Cheryl
A grade 12 student who is a victim of the Delbrook Secondary School massacre. Cheryl grew up in a non-religious environment but becomes religious through her pursuit of Jason. Her family are agnostic and dislike her newfound faith. Cheryl is the last fatality, before Jason kills one of the gunmen. Her story alternates between her former life and current oblivion. Jason and Cheryl wed in Las Vegas. She informs Jason that she is pregnant with his child, just a few hours before the massacre occurs.
Jason
A quiet and rebellious child from a very religious family, Jason is narrates the second section of the novel. His father, Reg, is self-righteous, zealous, and unapologetic, and seems to favour his older brother Kent.
Reg
Reg is the narrator of the fourth part of the novel. Born to a strict father, Reg turned to belief as his salvation. Creating a very strict religious code for himself, Reg married and became the father to two children, Kent and Jason. Kent was his father's child, following in his father's religious footsteps. During the novel, Reg transforms from a narrow fundamentalist mindset to become more open and loving.
Jason's mother
Jason's mother married Reg due to his strong beliefs. She leaves Reg after he casts out Jason, and takes Jason across Canada. She eventually succumbs to alcohol-induced dementia.
Kent
Jason's older brother. He is a leader of a Christian movement and is Reg's favourite son. Kent is married to Barb, and has two twin sons with her. He dies in a car accident in the second part of the novel.
Barb
Kent's wife, but she is the mother of Jason's twin sons, therefore Kent's nephews. She and Kent tried to have kids but it didn't work. Since she was desperate to have kids, and Kent dies, she forces Jason to have sex with her, hoping the child will look like Kent. After a fallout with Reg, she remains close to Jason until his disappearance.
Heather
Jason's romantic partner in the latter half of the novel, Heather is another narrator. She feels distant and is brought back into the world, just as she brings out Jason from his emotional seclusion. She creates characters and stories with Jason, which are later provided back to her by a psychic, who Heather believes will bring her back to the missing Jason.

== Inspiration ==
Coupland began to write the novel in December 2001, after a "nightmarish 40-city tour" of the United States that allowed him to experience the country's "collective sorrow". He began to research the events of the Columbine massacre after this experience.

Some people say, how come you never explored the motives of the ones who did the shooting. To my mind, that was all people talked about. I'm very much a fan of JG Ballard, where you have people in this fantastically quotidian situation that goes suddenly wrong, and how people deal with that. Killers get too much press already. I remember growing up, the stories in which they live happily ever after, and the only part that I was interested was, like, after that. Well it was fun for a while then they broke up and she got into crystal meth, found religion and turned into a lesbian. That's the part I wanted to know. That's far more interesting to me.

— Coupland in The Observer

The quotation from Corinthians that opens the novel was found on a gravestone of a child who died in a high school shooting.

== History of the novel ==
The novel was an international best-seller and was received well by critics.

One lesson I've learned is that you can never guess how a work will be received, … Curiously, The Rocky Mountain News, which is the daily that did the most intense documentation of the incident, and which is the one paper I might have been a bit tetchy about, gave the book an A-minus and told its readers that the memory of Columbine was respected, and in no way diminished or exploited. My personal litmus test was that I didn't want any family member of a Columbine shooting to feel that their loss was being exploited.

— Coupland in The Globe and Mail

The novel was released the same week as Gus Van Sant's film Elephant, which also dealt with a Columbine-like situation.

Coupland also had an art installation on the same topic, called "Tropical Birds", which featured 3D versions of the kneeling figure from the front cover of Hey Nostradamus!, and other pieces which features scenes from a school shooting tragedy.

== See also ==
- Columbine High School massacre
- Delbrook Senior Secondary School
