= PLANT Architect Inc. =

Practice information
- Firm type: Architecture, Landscape Architecture, Installation Artwork
- Founders: Mary Tremain, Chris Pommer, Lisa Rapoport
- Founded: 1994

Website
- https://branchplant.com/

PLANT Architect Inc. is a Toronto based interdisciplinary firm founded in 1994 by Chris Pommer, Lisa Rapoport, and Mary Tremain. Areas of practice for this firm include; architecture, landscape architecture, installation art and much more. With a multidisciplinary background and approach that focuses on design at a variety of scales, PLANT Architect seeks to create design that responds to the overlaps between these areas.

== Founders ==
The founding team consists of Chris Pommer, Lisa Rapoport, and Mary Tremain. They cofounded PLANT Architect in 1994 with the intention of forming an interdisciplinary firm that collaborates and works in many areas of design.

Chris Pommer graduated from the University of Waterloo in 1988. He worked with Ferguson Ferguson Architects before cofounding PLANT. He has also worked with Bruce Mau Design in Toronto as a Senior Designer and has lectured and taught in universities. Universities in which he has lectured and taught include; University of Toronto, University of Waterloo, and University of Manitoba.

Lisa Rapoport – another founding member of the firm – also graduated from the University of Waterloo in 1988. After graduating, she worked for many Toronto firms, and became was a professor at the University of Waterloo and a visiting professor at the Illinois Institute of Technology in Chicago.

The third founding partner of the firm is Mary Tremain. She graduated from the University of Waterloo in 1986 with a Bachelor of Honours in Architecture. Before founding PLANT, she oversaw a lot of different types of projects from realms of landscape to architecture. She has also been a professor at the University of Toronto.

== Notable competitions ==
Some notable competition wins include the following:

Year	Competition	
2006	Stratford Market Square Competition	Winner
2007	Nathan Phillips Square Revitalization Competition, Toronto	Winner
2007	Dublin Grounds of Remembrance, Dublin, Ohio	Winner
2010	Canadian Fallen Firefighters Memorial, Ottawa	Winner
2012	The Kelpies, Edinburgh, Scotland	Finalist
2018	York Street Park, Toronto, Canada	Finalist
2019	Toronto Business Improvement Areas (TABIA) Award	
2019	Toronto Association of Business Improvement Areas (TABIA) Award	
2019	World Landscape Architecture Award	(Shortlisted)
2020	Niagara Biennial Outstanding Achievement Award	
2020	Ontario Association of Architects (OAA) Design Excellence Awards	Finalist
2020	Architizer A+ Awards	(Shortlisted)
2021	Toronto Urban Design Award	(Shortlisted)
