= Eleanor Rigby (novel) =

2004 book by Douglas Coupland

- Author: Douglas Coupland
- Language: English
- Genre: Novel
- Publisher: Bloomsbury USA
- Publication date: December 23, 2004
- Publication place: Canada
- Media type: Print (Hardcover & Paperback)
- Preceded by: Hey Nostradamus!
- Followed by: JPod

Eleanor Rigby is a 2004 novel by Douglas Coupland, about a lonely woman at ages 36 and 42. The novel is written as a first-person narrative by the main character, Liz Dunn. Its title is derived from the 1966 song of the same name by the Beatles.

The novel centres on changes to Liz's life when someone from her past unexpectedly re-enters her life. It is written in a light, often comic, tone, but resonates on many deeper issues, including loneliness, family, religious visions and multiple sclerosis.

== Plot ==
Two distinct plot movements are separated by a break in the narrative flow. The first part of the novel involves two retellings: the story of Liz Dunn’s trip to Europe and her pregnancy, and the story of the re-emergence into her life of her child, Jeremy, who is dying of multiple sclerosis.

As a teenager, Liz traveled to Europe—a highly significant and emotionally charged moment in her life. During this trip, while intoxicated in Italy, she engaged in a sexual encounter with a man whose identity she cannot recall. This experience led to a pregnancy, and she gave birth to a child named Jeremy. Following his birth, Jeremy was placed for adoption; he spent a large portion of his childhood living with various foster families.

Jeremy arrives back into Liz’s life when she is at a low point of loneliness. His illness is terminal, and because of drug abuse, he has only a short time to live. Jeremy’s introduction into Liz’s life rattles the lonely world she has constructed, opening up her and her world.

The first part of the novel, narrated by Liz, jumps between these two moments, constantly reminding the reader that these are moments in the past. There is a symbolic page break between the first section, which takes place in the past, and the second section, which takes place in the novel’s present.

In the present, Jeremy has died. Liz finds a meteorite that she takes to be a very precious object. She sleeps with it under her pillow to keep it close. She eventually, through a list of circumstances, decides to travel to Europe to find Jeremy’s father, a trip which again leads her to a world of excitement, police and army incidents, and a reunion with Jeremy’s father.

== Characters ==
=== Liz Dunn ===
Liz Dunn is the protagonist of this novel. She is an overweight, lonely woman, who lives a removed solitary existence. Her apartment, for instance, can only accommodate one person.

Coupland has spoken extensively about the character of Liz Dunn, claiming that she was his most realistic character.

"…She’s actually one of the first characters I’ve created who I can talk about like she’s real, she comes from an upbringing in a generally democratic society where no one tells you about the currency of lust or the currency of bodies or of family name. Warhol used to say that people get scored out of 40 based on looks, body, money and fame, that you could be rich and good-looking but if you’re not famous or don’t have a good body, you won’t make it. It’s a surprisingly shallow yet surprisingly effective measure to learn ... and Liz, well she’s just slipped through all the cracks."

— Coupland in The Weekend Australian

=== Jeremy ===
Liz’s son Jeremy, who was sent out for adoption, has a terminal case of multiple sclerosis. He has traveled through the foster-care system of British Columbia, residing with many families who abused him. He eventually reconnects with Liz after finding her and registers her as his next of kin for emergencies. When he is hospitalized, Liz reconnects with her son.

Jeremy is cheerful in the face of his condition, happy with the life that he has left to lead. He eventually becomes a successful mattress salesman in the time leading up to his death. He experiences visions of a post-apocalyptic future, which enthralls Liz. He envisions a future where crops have gone foul and farmers ask a divine voice for guidance.

== Inspiration ==
=== Loneliness ===
The inspiration for Eleanor Rigby was loneliness. Coupland suffered through a period in his early twenties he describes as being caused by loneliness.

"If they told us in school that there was this weird thing you were going to experience the moment you turn 20, that would have been a great service. It might be just a North American thing but you always have to smile for the camera and give it your best. Negative emotions, or inevitable emotions, never get discussed."

— Coupland in The Age (Melbourne)

"When you’re lonely, that’s all you can think about. Then the moment you’re not lonely, you run away and avoid lonely people altogether because you don’t want to be reminded of that part of your life. So we don’t talk about it. And when it happens, most people don’t know what it is. They think it must be clinical depression, or an allergy. I think because it is lumped in with depression and other medical conditions, people want to say, ‘Oh, just take your Paxil and come back when you’re feeling better.’ But it’s not like that."

— Coupland in The Globe And Mail

=== The title ===
The novel is named after the Beatles' 1966 song of the same name. The song reference was inspired from a moment in Coupland's past. Coupland heard the song "on a friend's mother's record player. And the story threw me: 'Oh my God, what happened to her?' The lyrics didn't tell you much but in my head I always saw her as an only child of very old parents who didn't have a clue and she was left in a rectory and died without leaving any mark anywhere ... The book's not like that, of course, but it's the mood and the way Liz describes herself." The song itself features in the narrative as it is Liz Dunn's email address.
