= Generation A (book) =

2009 English-language novel by Douglas Coupland

- Author: Douglas Coupland
- Language: English
- Genre: Postmodern literature, novel
- Publisher: Random House Canada
- Publication date: August, 2009 (UK); September 1, 2009 (Canada); November 10, 2009 (US)
- Publication place: Canada
- Media type: Print (hardback)
- Pages: 297
- ISBN: 978-0-307-35772-4
- OCLC: 317353344
- Preceded by: The Gum Thief
- Followed by: Player One – What Is to Become of Us?

Generation A is the thirteenth novel from Canadian novelist Douglas Coupland. It is dedicated to Anne Collins and takes place in a near future, in a world in which bees have become extinct. The novel is told with a shifting-frame narrative perspective, shifting between the novel's five main protagonists. The novel mirrors the style of Coupland's first novel, Generation X: Tales for an Accelerated Culture, which is also a framed narrative. On September 30, 2009, Generation A was announced as a finalist for The Rogers Writers' Trust Fiction Prize by The Writer's Trust of Canada.

== Synopsis ==
Coupland's website has a synopsis of the novel:

"In the near future bees are extinct—until one autumn when five unconnected individuals, in Iowa, New Zealand, Paris, Ontario, and Sri Lanka, are stung. Immediately snatched up by ominous figures in hazmat suits, interrogated separately in neutral Ikea-like chambers, and then released as 15-minute-celebrities into a world driven almost entirely by the internet, these five unforgettable people endure a barrage of unusual and highly 21st-century circumstances. A charismatic scientist with dubious motives eventually brings the quintet together on a remote Canadian island. But their shared experience unites them in a way they could never have imagined."

— Generation A on Coupland.com

== Characters ==
Zack Lammle
Zack is the first character to be stung by a bee. He is a corn farmer in Mahaska County, Iowa. He has Attention Deficit Disorder, and a fondness for cursing and acting against the social grain. For instance, when he is stung, he is currently carving a large image of a penis and testicles into his corn field, so that it could be photographed from space.
Samantha Tolliver
Samantha is the second character to be stung. She is from Palmerston North, Manawatū, New Zealand. Her parents had recently told her that they do not believe in anything anymore, such as God and religion. When she is stung, she is creating an Earth Sandwich, where two people place two slices of bread on exactly opposite sides of the planet using GPS coordinates. (The Earth Sandwich is in reference to a May 2006 challenge issued to viewers by Internet performance artist Ze Frank.).
Julien Picard
Julien is the third character to be stung. He was at the 12th Arrondissement in Paris, France. He was an avid World of Warcraft player whose characters had recently been deleted from the gaming world without notice or cause. He is the child of European intellectuals: his father works for CERN in Geneva. His disposition to the world is similar to Zack's, but he is more withdrawn from the world, where Zack embraces it.
Diana Beaton
Diana is the fourth character to be stung. She is from North Bay, Ontario. She has Tourette's, which leads her to have many strange outbursts of profanities. She claims that her Tourette's causes her to speak the truth about people, no matter how profane the truth is. She is stung in the moment in which she leaves her church over her priest's defense of an animal abuse.
Harj Vetharanayan
Harj is the last character to be stung. He is from Trincomalee, Sri Lanka. His family was washed away in the 2004 tsunami. He is working at a call center for Abercrombie & Fitch. He had created a prank commerce site which sold "silence" MP3s, which were bogus sound files of the putative silence in celebrity rooms . The New York Times was interviewing him at the moment of his sting, from the other side of the planet.

== Style ==
The novel "mirrors the style" of Coupland's breakthrough first novel, Generation X: Tales for an Accelerated Culture. The story is told through non-numbered chapters, just as the first was. The book is told with a shifting narrative perspective. Each chapter title announces whose perspective the rest of the chapter will be in. The book rotates in the order of Harj, Zack, Samantha, Julien, and Diana for most of the work. Some changes happen due to the plot.

The novel is also, like Generation X, a framed narrative. However, as this novel mirrors the style, the framed narrative style is also reflected. The first novel has stories in a frame, where the stories are the important part of the tale. In this novel, the stories help to bring out the characters. Throughout the novel, the importance of stories in a person's life is discussed, and in this novel, the stories are important only so much as they bring out and expand on the character's stories.

== Title ==
The title is also a reference to Coupland's first novel, and it comes from a quote by Kurt Vonnegut. It is listed in an epigraph:

"Now you young twerps want a new name for your generation? Probably not, you just want jobs, right? Well, the media do us all such tremendous favors when they call you Generation X, right? Two clicks from the very end of the alphabet. I hereby declare you Generation A, as much at the beginning of a series of astonishing triumphs and failures as Adam and Eve were so long ago."

— Kurt Vonnegut Syracuse University commencement address May 8, 1994
