= Jack H. Breslow =

American illustrator and painter (1927–2023)

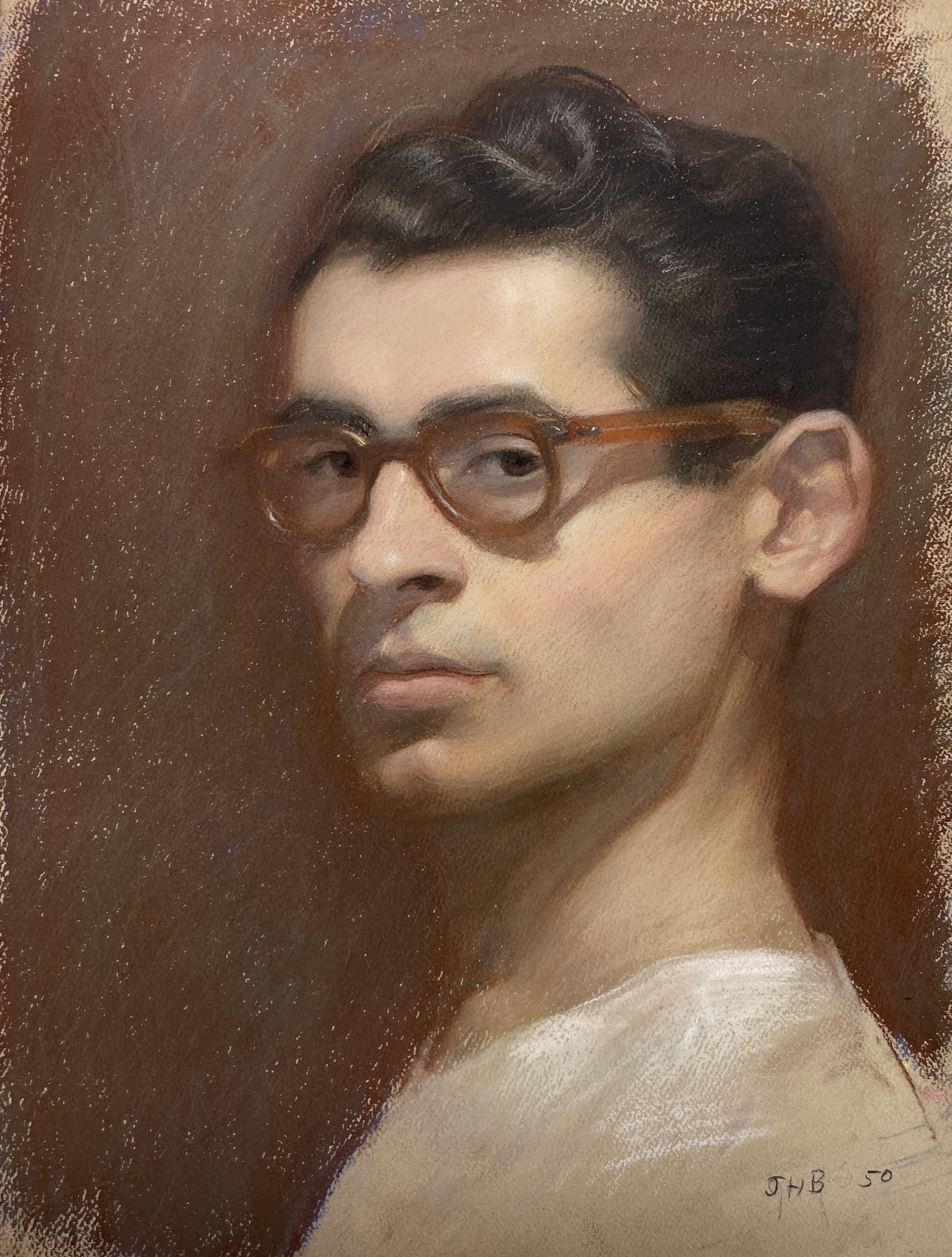
- Breslow's self-portrait
- Born: 1927; The Bronx, New York City
- Died: 2023 (aged 95–96)
- Occupation: Artist
- Known for: Science fiction art Portrait art Abstract art

Jack H. Breslow (1927 - 2023) was an American illustrator and painter known for his illustrations for Time Magazine, cover art for science fiction novels, and works in the National Portrait Gallery. In his later career, he pursued large-scale abstract paintings of nature and landscapes.

== Life and career ==
Jack H. Breslow was raised in the Bronx, New York City. Following military service, Breslow received formal artistic training at the Académie Julian in Paris and the Art Students League of New York. Working in studios, Breslow established himself as a commercial artist, creating movie posters, paintings in the National Portrait Gallery, and book covers, the lattermost including novels by Andre Norton, Arthur K. Barnes, Poul Anderson, and Philip K. Dick. In 1971, Breslow illustrated portrait covers for Time Magazine of musician James Taylor and US President Jimmy Carter. After his illustration career, Breslow focused on fine arts by painting large-scale works of nature and landscapes, mostly in black-and-white.

== Selected works ==
=== Cover art ===
- 1972 Interplanetary Hunter, written by Arthur K. Barnes
- 1972 Star Trek 7, written by James Blish
- 1972 The Game-Players of Titan, written by Philip K. Dick
- 1973 The Best Laid Schemes, written by Larry Eisenberg
- 1973 War of the Wing-Men, written by Poul Anderson
- 1974 The Crack in Space, written by Philip K. Dick
- 1974 Isle of the Dead, written by Roger Zelazny
- 1974 Year of the Unicorn, written by Andre Norton
- 1975 Eye in the Sky, written by Philip K. Dick
- 1977 Warlock of the Witch World, written by Andre Norton

=== Portraiture ===
- 1971 James Taylor for Time Magazine (in the National Portrait Gallery)
- 1971 President Jimmy Carter for Time Magazine (in the National Portrait Gallery)
