= List of Ergo Proxy episodes =

Logo of Ergo Proxy

The following is a list of episodes for the Japanese anime series Ergo Proxy. Ergo Proxy was produced by Manglobe, Inc. and directed by Shūkō Murase, with Dai Satō being chief writer, Naoyuki Onda in charge of character designs and Yoshihiro Ike composing the music. It began broadcasting in Japan on February 25, 2006, on WOWOW. The anime was formerly licensed by Geneon Entertainment in North America, and as of now the license has been rescued by Funimation. Ergo Proxy was at first only released on DVD in North America, until the series was syndicated on Fuse starting on June 9, 2007, at 12:30 a.m. in the United States. The series' opening theme song is "Kiri" by rock group Monoral, and is first shown in episode 3. The ending theme song is "Paranoid Android" by English alternative rock band Radiohead, originally released in 1997. Because of licensing issues surrounding the song's use, the show's Hulu release uses a different ending theme.

== List of episodes ==
No.	Title	Directed by	Written by	Original release date	English air date
1	"Pulse of Awakening / awakening" Transliteration: "Hajimari no Kodō" (Japanese: はじまりの鼓動 / awakening)	Kei Tsunematsu	Dai Satō	February 25, 2006	June 9, 2007
When a series of mysterious attacks involving Cogito infected AutoReivs occur, Re-l is assigned to investigate, and encounters a humanoid monster. Later, she is attacked by two of these monsters at her home.
2	"Confession of a Fellow Citizen / confession" Transliteration: "Yoki Shimin no Kokuhaku" (Japanese: 良き市民の告白 / confession)	Akira Toba	Dai Satō; Yūsuke Asayama	March 4, 2006	June 16, 2007
Re-l struggles to convince her peers of her encounters with the monsters, which she learns are called Proxy. She is removed from the investigation and finds that Iggy has had his memories of recent events erased. Meanwhile, Vincent finds himself on the run from a Proxy and then the city's authorities.
3	"Leap into the Void / mazecity" Transliteration: "Mu e no Chōyaku" (Japanese: 無への跳躍 / mazecity)	Tatsuya Igarashi	Dai Satō; Yūsuke Asayama	March 11, 2006	June 23, 2007
Romdeau is no longer a safe haven for Vincent. He is trying to avoid capture by the authorities. As he flees he comes across the infected AutoReiv Pino. Pino then shows him the way to escape from Romdeau to the outside world. Re-l struggles to contact Vincent and uncover the true nature of his involvement with the Proxy.
4	"Signs of Future, Hades of Future / futu-risk" Transliteration: "Mirai Yomi, Mirai Yomi" (Japanese: 未来詠み、未来黄泉 / futu-risk)	Ōki Hashimoto	Dai Satō	March 18, 2006	July 7, 2007
Vincent and Pino are taken in by a small commune, the inhabitants of which make a living off the refuse dumped from the Dome. Meanwhile, Raul plans his move to locate and capture Vincent.
5	"Recall / TWILIGHT"; Transliteration: "Shōkan" (Japanese: 召還 / TASOGARE)	Sayo Yamamoto	Seiko Takagi	April 1, 2006	July 14, 2007
Re-l braves the outside world in order to bring Vincent back to Romdeau. While there, Raul commences his plan to capture Vincent by attacking the Commune with patrol drones. Re-l's environmental suit is damaged and Vincent is injured in the attack. Re-l's suspicions are confirmed that there is a link between Vincent and the Proxies.
6	"Return Home / domecoming" Transliteration: "Kikan" (Japanese: 帰還 / domecoming)	Kei Tsunematsu	Yūko Kawabe	April 8, 2006	July 21, 2007
Re-l's life becomes endangered when she falls ill after exposure to the harsh environment. Hoody hatches a cunning plan to trick Raul and return to Romdeau. Quinn leads a group on an escape from the Commune using the Rabbit.
7	"re-l124c41+" Transliteration: "Riru 124C41+" (Japanese: リル124C41+)	Akira Toba	Dai Satō	April 15, 2006	July 28, 2007
Re-l recovers from her illness and wanders through the facility, where she stumbles upon Romdeau's artificial birthing system. Daedalus finds her and the two discuss the purpose and relevance of the Dome. Meanwhile, Vincent makes his way to Mosk, his birth place, with Pino and the survivors from the drone attack. Back in Romdeau, Re-l reunites with Iggy. Daedalus also reveals that the entity called Monad Proxy was pilfered from Mosk and is a "life force" made up of indestructible Amrita cells. Comparable to gods, Proxies are connected to the continued survival of humans in this post-apocalyptic world. The trio is suddenly attacked by a group of infected AutoReivs sent by Raul and Re-l appears to be wounded during the fight. On the Rabbit, Pino and Vincent are left alone after the death of their companions. The episode ends with Daedalus filling out Re-l's death certificate.
8	"Light Beam / shining sign" Transliteration: "Kōsen" (Japanese: 光線 / shining sign)	Daiki Nishimura	Dai Satō; Yūsuke Asayama	April 22, 2006	August 4, 2007
Vincent and Pino are caught in the middle of a battle between humans and AutoReivs. Commander Patecatl takes them in and reveals that the remaining inhabitants of Halos are fighting to protect their "womb" (an artificial birthing system similar to Romdeau's) from the invading AutoReivs. When two soldiers are inexplicably killed, Vincent and Pino are imprisoned next to a deranged woman who preaches of moonlight and awakening. As the humans are gradually overtaken by the AutoReivs, Commander Patecatl attempts to escape but is killed by the female Proxy responsible for the soldiers' deaths. Vincent, now in his Proxy form, fights and kills her, seemingly draining her energy through his eyes. The entire battle is narrated by the woman from the prison, who then dies from her injuries. Soon after, a mysterious man with long blond hair arrives and examines the dead Proxy.
9	"Shards of Brilliance / angel's share" Transliteration: "Kagayaki no Hahen" (Japanese: 輝きの破片 / angel's share)	Aki Yoshimura	Yūko Kawabe	April 29, 2006	August 11, 2007
Vincent awakes under the care of the blond man from the last episode, Kazkis Hauer. An alcoholic addicted to red wine, he is the supervisor of Asura Dome. Their exchanges become extremely strained after Pino stumbles upon the army of now inactive AutoReivs responsible for the destruction of Halos. Kazkis reveals himself as the Proxy of Sunlight and explains that the female Proxy killed had been his lover, Senex, the Proxy of Moonlight and supervisor of Halos. He perceives Vincent as her replacement but becomes enraged when it appears as though Vincent has no memories of his past. Through a fight, Kazkis forces Vincent to come to terms with his true nature as Ergo Proxy, the Proxy of Death, before dying and reuniting spiritually with Senex. Vincent then joins Pino on the Rabbit and the two continue their trip to Mosk.
10	"Existence / cytotropism" Transliteration: "Sonzai" (Japanese: 存在 / cytotropism)	Mitsuhiro Yoneda	Seiko Takagi	May 13, 2006	August 18, 2007
Disturbed by recent events, Raul questions the future of Romdeau. After threatening Deadalus, Raul reinstates his position so that he may continue the research on the Proxy Monad. Deadalus, however, has his own plans for the type of research he wishes to perform. It is revealed that it was not Raul, but the administration that attempted to assassinate Re-l. Meanwhile, Re-l and Iggy explore a strange antiquated dome inhabited only by primitive AutoReivs.
11	"In the White Darkness / anamnesis" Transliteration: "Shiroi Yami no Naka" (Japanese: 白い闇の中 / anamnesis)	Kei Tsunematsu	Dai Satō	May 20, 2006	August 25, 2007
Vincent finds a strange bookstore and an even stranger old man, where he discovers more about his true nature. Tumbling through a series of dream-like sequences, he is prodded to recall more of his past and more about the history of what befell the earth. Re-l and Iggy catch up on the Centzon.
12	"When You're Smiling / hideout" Transliteration: "Kimi Hohoemeba" (Japanese: 君微笑めば / hideout)	Akira Toba	Yuko Kawabe	May 27, 2006	September 1, 2007
Vincent tells Re-l that he is a Proxy, but she refuses to believe him. Vincent and Pino take off in the Rabbit, however Re-l and Iggy follow. After Re-l contemplates testing the gun capable of killing Proxies on Vincent, he confesses his love for her. The group then is confronted by a vagrant Proxy and its companion AutoReiv, and Re-l puts her new weapon to use. Re-l sends a conflicted Iggy back to Romdeau, and joins Vincent on his quest for the truth.
13	"Conceptual Blind Spots / wrong way home" Transliteration: "Kōsō no Shikaku" (Japanese: 構想の死角 / wrong way home)	Tatsuya Igarashi	Yūko Kawabe	June 3, 2006	September 8, 2007
The homeless AutoReiv retrieves his master's body from a confused Iggy, and drags him back to a room. Iggy realizes it is an identical Womb Room. The infected Iggy, reflecting on his duty, becomes enraged and kidnaps Re-l, setting out to kill Vincent that he believes has turned Re-l against him. Re-l is again confronted by the homeless AutoReiv but is saved by Iggy, who sacrifices himself to save her.
14	"Someone Like You / ophelia" Transliteration: "Anata ni Nita Dareka" (Japanese: 貴方に似た誰か / ophelia)	Masaki Kitamura	Naruki Nagakawa	June 10, 2006	September 15, 2007
While resting in a long-abandoned dome, strange occurrences take place and the trio's lives are endangered.
15	"Nightmare Quiz Show 1 million points in 30 minutes / WHO WANTS TO BE IN JEOPARDY!"; Transliteration: "Nama Akumu no Kuizu SHOW 30-Bun DE 100-Man En!" (Japanese: 生 悪夢のクイズSHOW 30分DE100万円! / WHO WANTS TO BE IN JEOPARDY!)	Sayo Yamamoto	Dai Satō; Junichi Matsumoto	June 17, 2006	September 22, 2007
Finding himself in a bizarre live game show, Vincent's trivia knowledge is put to the test as he battles for his life.
16	"Dead Calm / busy doing nothing" Transliteration: "Deddo Kāmu" (Japanese: デッドカーム / busy doing nothing)	Kei Tsunematsu	Seiko Takagi	June 24, 2006	September 29, 2007
When winds die out, the trio are stranded aboard the Centzon and Re-l finds herself struggling to hold on to her sanity.
17	"Never-Ending Battle / terra incognita" Transliteration: "Owaranai Tatakai" (Japanese: 終わらない戦い / terra incognita)	Akira Toba	Yūko Kawabe	July 1, 2006	October 6, 2007
Romdeau is on high alert as they search for the fugitive Raul, who plans to activate a deadly weapon. Meanwhile, the trio discover strange humanoids living inside a toxic cave system.
18	"Sign of the End / life after god" Transliteration: "Shūchaku no Shirabe" (Japanese: 終着の調べ / life after god)	Mitsuhiro Yoneda	Naruki Nagakawa	July 8, 2006	October 13, 2007
The trio reach the devastated Mosk, Vincent's home city, and find that the truths lead back to Romdeau.
19	"The Girl with a Smile / eternal smile" Transliteration: "Shōjo Sumairu" (Japanese: 少女スマイル / eternal smile)	Sayo Yamamoto	Dai Satō; Yūsuke Asayama	July 15, 2006	October 20, 2007
Pino explores the mysterious Smile Land with the NaKaMa, and confronts the Creator of the city.
20	"Sacred Eye of the Void / Goodbye, Vincent"; Transliteration: "Kokū no Hijiri Me" (Japanese: 虚空の聖眼 / Goodbye Vincent)	Tatsuya Igarashi	Yūko Kawabe	July 22, 2006	October 27, 2007
Vincent finds himself trapped within Re-l's consciousness, and observes powerlessly as events unfold.
21	"The Place at the End of Time / shampoo planet" Transliteration: "Toki Hate Tsuru Sho" (Japanese: 時果つる処 / shampoo planet)	Kei Tsunematsu	Naruki Nagakawa	July 29, 2006	November 3, 2007
A Cogito outbreak spreads through Romdeau and the city falls into chaos. Raul incites the people to revolt, pushing them to hunt down and kill all AutoReivs.
22	"Bind / bilbul" Transliteration: "Shikkoku" (Japanese: 桎梏 / bilbul)	Akira Toba	Yūko Kawabe	August 5, 2006	November 17, 2007
As the city continues to crumble, Vincent and Re-l encounter Proxy One. Raul is overcome with regret and despair, and sets out to find Pino.
23	"Proxy / deus ex machina" Transliteration: "Dairinin" (Japanese: 代理人 / deus ex machina)	Shūkō Murase	Dai Satō	August 12, 2006	November 24, 2007
Pieces are played and revelations uncovered as the final fight commences. Monad makes her return and tries to convince Vincent to join her.

== DVD ==
Title	Number	Release date
Ergo Proxy Volume 1: Awakening	1	November 21, 2006
1. Awakening (Pulse of Awakening); 2. Confession (Confession of a Fellow Citizen); 3. Mazecity (Leap into the Void); 4. Futu-risk (Signs of Future, Hades of Future)
Ergo Proxy Volume 2: Re-L124C41+	2	January 23, 2007
5. Tasogare (Recall); 6. Domecoming (Return Home); 7. RE-L124C41+ (re-l124c41+); 8. Shining Sign (Light Ray)
Ergo Proxy Volume 3: Cytotropism	3	April 3, 2007
9. Angel's Share (Brilliant Shards); 10. Cytotropism (Existence); 11. Anamnesis (In the White Darkness); 12. Hideout (When You're Smiling)
Ergo Proxy Volume 4: Wrong Way Home	4	May 29, 2007
13. Wrong Way Home (Conceptual Blind Spot); 14. Ophelia (Someone Like You); 15. Who Wants to be in Jeopardy? (Nightmare Quiz Show); 16. Busy Doing Nothing (Dead Calm)
Ergo Proxy Volume 5: Terra Incognita	5	July 24, 2007
17. Terra Incognita (Never-Ending Battle); 18. Life After God (Sign of the End); 19. Eternal Smile (The Girl With a Smile); 20. Goodbye Vincent (Sacred Eye of the Void)
Ergo Proxy Volume 6: Deus ex Machina	6	September 25, 2007
21. Shampoo Planet (The Place at the End of Time); 22. Bilbul (Bonds); 23. Deus ex Machina (Proxy)
