= Eye in the Sky (novel) =

Novel by Philip K. Dick

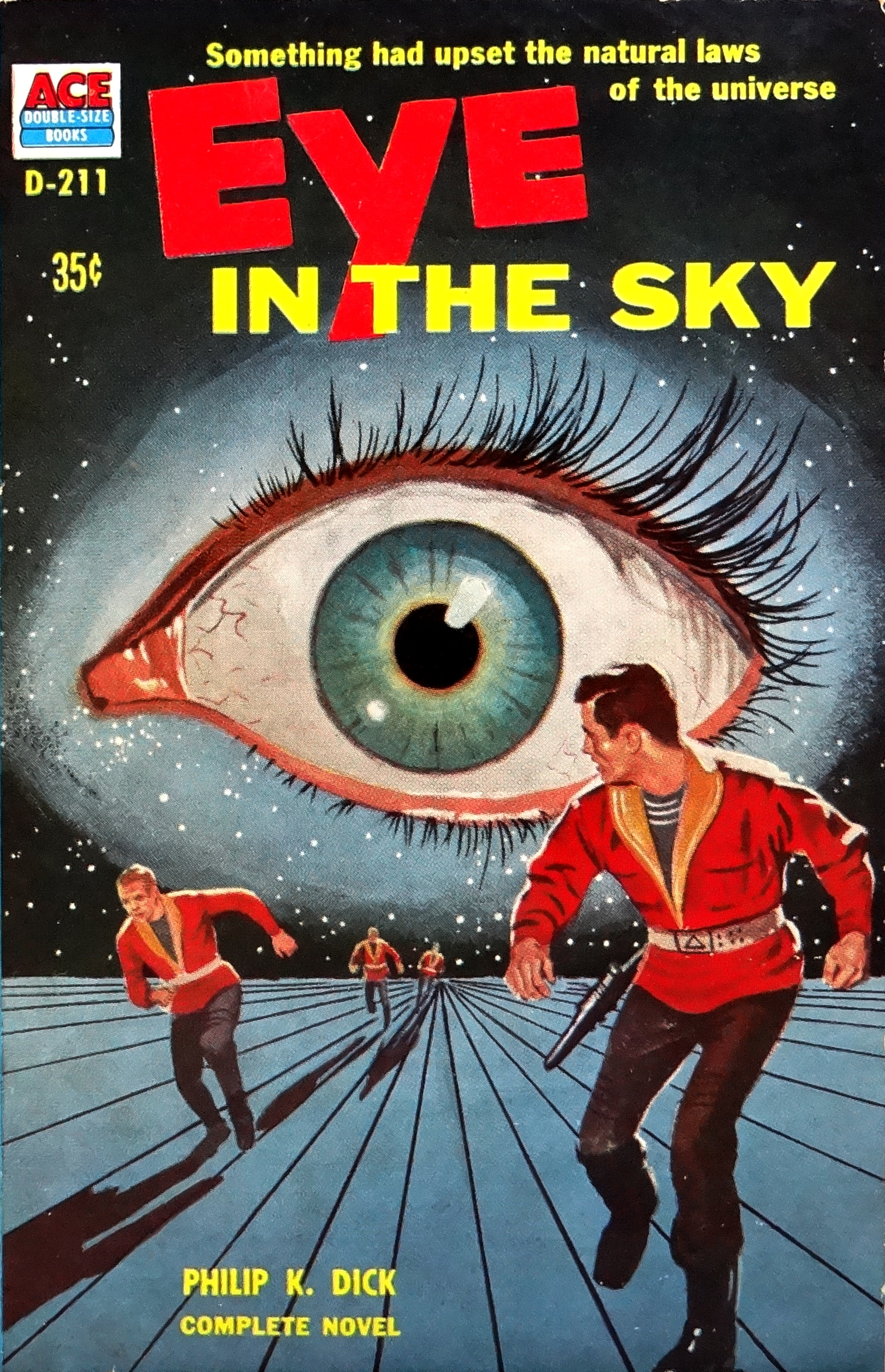
- Cover of first edition (paperback)
- Author: Philip K. Dick
- Language: English
- Genre: Science fiction
- Publisher: Ace Books
- Publication date: 1957
- Publication place: United States
- Media type: Print (hardback & paperback)
- Pages: 255

Eye in the Sky is a science fiction novel by American writer Philip K. Dick, originally published in 1957.

After an accident at the Belmont Bevatron, eight people are forced into several different alternate universes. These ersatz universes are later revealed to be solipsistic manifestations of each individual's innermost fears and prejudices, bringing the story in line with Dick's penchant for subjective realities. As well as his future discussions of theology and fears about McCarthy-era authoritarianism, the novel skewers several human foibles.

The title refers to the eye of God, who appears as a character in the universe of religious fundamentalist Arthur Sylvester.

== Plot summary ==
While on a visit to the (fictional) Belmont Bevatron in the 1957 novel's near-future year of 1959, eight people become stuck in a series of subtly and not-so-subtly unreal worlds. The instigating incident is a malfunction of the particle accelerator, which places all of the injured parties in states of total or partial unconsciousness.

Jack Hamilton, the central protagonist, is dismissed from his job at the California Maintenance Labs due to McCarthy-era paranoia about his wife Marsha's left-wing political sympathies; this dismissal is instigated by security chief Charlie McFeyffe. Bill Laws, an African-American possessing a PhD in Physics, is employed as a lowly tour guide for the Bevatron. Arthur Sylvester is an elderly political conservative and believer in an obsolete geocentric cosmology, derived from a schismatic Bábí offshoot. Joan Reiss is a pathologically paranoid woman, and Edith Pritchet is a maternal but censorious elderly woman. Her son David, along with Charlie McFeyffe, complete the eight-member tour group.

After the Bevatron fails, all eight members of the tour group are injured by a collapsing walkway and high levels of radiation. They awake to a world where miracles, prayer, and curses are common-day occurrences. Hamilton and Charles McFeyffe travel to heaven and glimpse a gargantuan eye of God. They discover that they are inside the mind of Arthur Sylvester and knock him unconscious, hoping that doing so will return them to reality. Instead, they continue to a different universe. The next universe is a caricature of Victorian morality in which Edith Pritchett has abolished everything which she considers unpleasant, and the third universe reveals the paranoid delusions of Joan Reiss.

Finally, the group arrives in a Marxist caricature of contemporary US society. The characters discover that Marsha Hamilton did not create this world. Instead, Charles McFeyffe is revealed as a Communist who is using his position as chief security officer to further the ideals of the Communist Party.

After McFeyffe is knocked unconscious, the group believes they have returned to the real world. Jack Hamilton and Bill Laws form a small business that seeks advances in stereophonic technology. The disclosure of McFeyffe's Marxist–Leninist allegiances is dismissed as unprovable. The novel ends ambiguously, as it is unclear if the group has returned to reality or is still living in someone else's universe. But if so, whoever it is seems to be a hands-off deity, content to let people live as they please and cultivate their own gardens.

== Reception ==
Anthony Boucher lauded the novel as "nicely calculated and adroitly revealed," saying that he had "never seen [its] theme handled with greater technical dexterity or given more psychological meaning."

== In popular culture ==
Episode 20 of the science fiction anime Ergo Proxy, titled "Sacred Eye of the Void/Goodbye, Vincent", is based on Eye in the Sky. In this episode, the protagonist awakens to find himself stuck inside someone's subconscious, presumably one of the main characters, and he must wade through realities within realities while figuring out how to escape—and alongside confirm that he is more than just an imaginative figment of the brain he is trapped in.

== Sources ==
- Nati, Maurizio. “Paura del diverso: Fobie d'oltreoceano in Occhio nel cielo”, in De Angelis & Rossi (eds.), Trasmigrazioni: I mondi di Philip K. Dick, Firenze, Le Monnier, 2006, pp. 131–41.
