= My Best Science Fiction Story =

1949 anthology edited by Leo Margulies and Oscar J. Friend

- dust cover of first edition
- Editor: Leo Margulies, Oscar J. Friend
- Language: English
- Genre: Science fiction
- Publisher: Merlin Press
- Publication date: 1949
- Publication place: United States
- Media type: Print (hardcover)
- Pages: xiv, 556

My Best Science Fiction Story is an anthology of science fiction short stories edited by Leo Margulies and Oscar J. Friend. It was first published in hardcover by Merlin Press in November 1949, and reprinted in August 1950. An abridged paperback edition including twelve of its twenty-five stories was published by Pocket Books in July 1954 and reprinted in November 1955.

The book collects twenty-five self-selected short stories and novelettes by as many science fiction authors, together with a general introduction by the editors and brief introductory essays prefacing each story by its author explaining the selection, each titled "Why I Selected '[Title of Story].' The selections are generally presented in alphabetical order by author (though the Heinlein piece is out of order). The stories were previously published from 1930-1949 in various science fiction and other magazines.

== Contents ==
Note: stories also appearing in the abridged paperback edition annotated PB.

- "Introduction" (Leo Margulies and Oscar J. Friend)
- "Robot AL 76 Goes Astray" (1942) (Isaac Asimov) PB
- "Grief of Bagdad" (1943) (Arthur K. Barnes)
- "The Teacher from Mars" (1941) (Eando Binder) PB
- "Almost Human" (1943) (Robert Bloch) PB
- "Zero Hour" (1947) (Ray Bradbury)
- "Nothing Sirius" (1944) (Fredric Brown)
- "Blindness" (1935) (John W. Campbell, Jr.) PB
- "Visiting Yokel" (1943) (Cleve Cartmill)
- "The Hibited Man" (1949) (L. Sprague de Camp)
- "The Thing in the Pond" (1934) (Paul Ernst)
- "Wanderer of Time" (1944) (John Russell Fearn)
- "The Inn Outside the World" (1945) (Edmond Hamilton) PB
- "The Professor Was a Thief" (1940) (L. Ron Hubbard)
- "Don't Look Now" (1948) (Henry Kuttner) PB
- "The Green Hills of Earth" (1947) (Robert A. Heinlein)
- "The Lost Race" (1949) (Murray Leinster) PB
- "The House of Rising Winds" (1948) (Frank Belknap Long)
- "The Carriers" (1949) (Sam Merwin, Jr.)
- "Dr. Grimshaw's Sanitarium" (1934) (Fletcher Pratt) PB
- "The Uncharted Isle" (1930) (Clark Ashton Smith)
- "Thunder and Roses" (1947) (Theodore Sturgeon)
- "The Ultimate Catalyst" (1939) (John Taine) PB
- "Project Spaceship" (1949) (A. E. van Vogt) PB
- "Space Station No. 1" (1936) (Manly Wade Wellman) PB
- "Star Bright" (1939) (Jack Williamson) PB

== Reception ==
The anthology was reviewed in Startling Stories v. 21, no. 1, March, 1950.
