= Generation X: Tales for an Accelerated Culture =

Novel by Douglas Coupland

- Author: Douglas Coupland
- Language: English
- Genre: Postmodern literature, novel
- Publisher: St. Martin's Press
- Publication date: March 15, 1991
- Publication place: Canada
- Media type: Print (hardback & paperback)
- Pages: 192
- ISBN: 0-312-05436-X (paperback)
- OCLC: 22510632
- Dewey Decimal: 813/.54 20
- LC Class: PS3553.O855 G46 1991
- Followed by: Shampoo Planet

Generation X: Tales for an Accelerated Culture is the first novel by Douglas Coupland, published by St. Martin's Press in 1991. The novel, which popularized the term "Generation X", is a framed narrative in which a group of youths exchange heartfelt stories about themselves and fantastical stories of their creation.

Coupland released the similarly titled Generation A in September 2009.

== Synopsis ==
Generation X is a framed narrative, like Chaucer's The Canterbury Tales or The Decameron by Boccaccio. The framing story is that of three friends—Dag, Claire, and the narrator, Andy—living together in the Coachella Valley in southern California. The tales are told by the various characters in the novel, which is arranged into three parts. Each chapter is separately titled rather than numbered, with titles such as "I Am Not a Target Market" and "Adventure Without Risk Is Disneyland".

The novel was set circa 1990, in the then-rapidly growing and economic booming-turned-into-depressed communities of Palm Springs and the Inland Empire region. Some characters were born and raised in Los Angeles and suburban Orange County.

=== Part One ===
The first part of the novel takes place over the course of a picnic. Andrew, Dag, and Claire tell each other stories—some personal, others imagined—over the course of the day. Through these tales, the reader glimpses the characters' motivations and personalities.

=== Part Two ===
The initial group of characters is expanded in this section, which introduces stories from additional characters: Claire's boyfriend Tobias, Claire's friend and Dag's love interest Elvissa, Andy's brother Tyler, and Andy's boss and neighbour and his wife, Mr. and Mrs. MacArthur. Each character represents a cultural type; Elvissa is constantly stuck in the past, Tobias is a "yuppie", Tyler is a "global teen", and the neighbours represent members of an older generation.

The frame is muted here, as the narrative draws back to reveal more of the main characters, while allowing for other characters' stories to be heard.

=== Part Three ===
In this section, the novel continues to pull back its focus, as Andy and Claire travel away from California. Again, the frame is enlarged to include additional characters. Claire travels to New York, while Andy takes a dreaded trip to visit his family in Portland. Through the characters' personal and mental journeys, more tales are told and more of the characters' personal stories are revealed.

== Characters ==
=== Andrew "Andy" Palmer ===
The book's narrator and main character. Andy is a bartender (a "McJob", as he describes it). He is close friends with Dag and Claire. He is from Portland, Oregon.

=== Dagmar "Dag" Bellinghausen ===
A former office worker, he now works with Andy at the bar, and lives next door to him. He is obsessed with the possibility of a nuclear holocaust, and is prone to occasional erratic behavior. Unlike the other characters (who are American), he is a Canadian, from Toronto.

=== Claire Baxter ===
A friend of Andy and Dag that lives in a neighboring bungalow. She is from a large family connected by multiple divorces. She wants to live life as Andy and Dag are trying to, but struggles, partially because of her relationship with Tobias. She is from Los Angeles, California.

=== Tobias ===
Claire's boyfriend, a superficial yuppie. He finds the lifestyle of Andy, Dag, and Claire to be interesting, but is unable to commit to it. Neither Andy nor Dag likes him, and he is a foil to the other characters in the novel. Yuppies in the novel were thought to represent Orange County (where they grew up), the Inland Empire (where they live) and L.A. (where they commuted to work).

=== Elvissa ===
Claire's best friend, and Dag's love interest. She finds herself constantly trapped in the past, never quite catching up to the modern world. The character represented the poverty and desolation of the Mojave and Sonoran deserts of California, particularly Palm Springs when spring breakers once partied there and where young gay couples moved en masse during the 1980s.

=== Tyler ===
Andy's little brother who is five years younger than Andy. As the youngest child in a large family, he is somewhat spoiled, but secretly wishes he could live as Andy does. He is described as a "global teen" and bears great similarity to the main character in Coupland's second novel, Shampoo Planet, that shares his name and mannerisms.

== Inspiration ==
Douglas Coupland discusses writing the novel
from the BBC programme Bookclub, 7 March 2010

=== Title ===
Coupland has presented different narratives concerning the origin of the title Generation X. In one version, the title came from the work of Paul Fussell. In Fussell's 1983 book Class, the term category X designated a part of America's social hierarchy rather than a generation. As Coupland explained in a 1995 interview, "In his final chapter, Fussell named an 'X' category of people who wanted to hop off the merry-go-round of status, money, and social climbing that so often frames modern existence." However, in a 1989 magazine article Coupland attributed the term Generation X to Billy Idol, since it is the name of the band Idol broke through with.

=== Novel ===
Coupland felt that people his age were being misclassified as members of the Baby Boomer generation.

I just want to show society what people born after 1960 think about things... We're sick of stupid labels, we're sick of being marginalized in lousy jobs, and we're tired of hearing about ourselves from others

— Coupland, Boston Globe, 1991

Later, Coupland described his novel as being about "the fringe of Generation Jones which became the mainstream of Generation X". Generation Jones is a term for tail-end Boomers, born between 1954 and 1964, who felt disconnected from the experiences of older Boomers such as the Vietnam War and the hippie subculture.

=== Character names ===
The characters are named after locations in Antarctica.

== History ==
In 1987, Coupland (who was born in 1961) wrote an article for Vancouver Magazine in which he lamented the lack of realization for people within his own birth cohort. A year later, he received a $22,500 advance from St. Martin's Press to complete a handbook on the "generation" that he had outlined in the article. Coupland moved to the Mojave desert and the Coachella Valley in California to work on the book, which became a novel. This surprised the publishing company, who canceled the work, which was subsequently accepted by St. Martin's Press and published in March 1991.

The novel was a sleeper bestseller, growing in popularity after a slow start. The terms Generation X and McJob entered the popular vernacular through the book, and Coupland was declared a spokesman for Generation X and lauded for having a feeling for the zeitgeist of the age.

The Generation X fanfare continued through the publication of his second novel, Shampoo Planet, the follow-up about a younger generation; it was also met with fanfare, and Coupland again called a spokesman for a generation.

However, Coupland constantly denied both the idea that there was a Generation X and that he was a spokesman.

This is going to sound heretical coming from me, but I don't think there is a Generation X. What I think a lot of people mistake for this thing that might be Generation X is just the acknowledgment that there exists some other group of people whatever, whoever they might be, younger than, say, Jane Fonda's baby boom.

— Coupland, CNN, 1994

Coupland was offered large sums of money to act as a marketing consultant for the Generation X age group, but he turned them down, notably refusing to create an advertisement for Gap. "Generation X" nonetheless became a marketing force, as the name and ideas were used to market products and services, such as the clothing store Generation Next and the 1995 Citroën car models called "La Generation X" as the XM.

In 1994, before the publication of Microserfs, Coupland declared in Details magazine that Generation X was dead. He stated that the term had been co-opted as a marketing term, and that members of Generation X were relatively resistant to marketing ploys.

The biting, ironic tone of the novel and its pop culture allusions helped bring about a new era of transgressive fiction, including the work of authors Irvine Welsh and Chuck Palahniuk. Still in use are the term Generation X and its many derivatives, such as Generation Y and Generation Z. Many critics linked the novel to the popularity of grunge and alternative rock, but it makes no reference to grunge, and the song that is widely credited for boosting grunge into mainstream popularity (Nirvana's "Smells Like Teen Spirit") was released after the novel's publication.

In 2026 Production Companies Dark Slope and No Equal Entertainment acquired the rights to develop Generation X as a television series. Development has begun while the Producers seek out a unique take. Douglas Coupland is quoted as saying “In three and a half decades Gen X has become something eternal, and this still surprises me. I do think J.B. and team Dark Slope can create a project that is equally as timeless."

== Editions ==
- ISBN 0-312-05436-X (paperback, 1991)
- ISBN 0-349-10331-3 (softcover, 1992)
- ISBN 0-312-11814-7 (hardcover, 1994)
- ISBN 0-349-10839-0 (paperback, 1996)
- ISBN 0-06-039250-9 (hardcover, 2000)
