= Mouseheart =

Series of adventure novels by Lisa Fiedler

- Cover of Volume 1
- Volumes: Mouseheart: Book One; Hopper's Destiny: Book Two; Return of the Forgotten: Book Three
- Author: Lisa Fiedler
- Illustrator: Vivienne To
- Country: United States
- Language: English
- Genre: Adventure; Children novel Fantasy
- Publisher: Margaret K. McElderry Books
- Published: 2014 – 2015
- Media type: Print (hardcover and paperback)
- No. of books: 3

The Mouseheart series is an ongoing series of children's adventure novels by Lisa Fiedler. The series currently comprises three books, the first of which was released in 2014 by Margaret K. McElderry Books.

== Plot overview ==
The series follows Hopper, a pet store mouse that escapes, only to end up in Atlantia, a colony created entirely of rats that lie underneath the city of Brooklyn. He quickly makes friends, however, he also finds that rebels and other troubles constantly plague the colony.

== Main characters ==
- Hopper

He is the main character, and very loyal and brave.

- Pinkie

She is Hopper's sister and is stubborn and fierce. The second book mentions that she is 'cold hearted' but later on has a change of character and redemption arc and is described as having a 'broken heart”.

- Pup

The younger brother of Hopper and Pinkie. He is a caring fellow, who turns cold, but later on turns remorseful.

- Zucker

The rat prince of Atlantia and son of Titus. He played a major role in the destruction of Atlantia's refugee camps.

- Firren

Leader of the rebel rats and an ally of the Mūs. She later on becomes the wife of Zucker and Queen of Atlantia.

- Emperor Titus

The evil rat king of Atlantia and father of Zucker. He struck an accord with cat queen, Felina, with a dark secret behind it.

- Felina

The evil cat queen of the tunnels, she holds a nasty reputation with the citizens of Atlantia and the Mūs.

== Books ==
- Mouseheart (2014)
- Hopper's Destiny (2015)
- Return of the Forgotten (2015)

== Critical reception ==
Critical reception has been positive and the series has been routinely recommended to fans of animal fantasy. The Bulletin of the Center for Children's Books gave a mixed review for the first book in the series, commenting "To’s occasional black and white digital illustrations are a little more cuddly than the text, but any kid who sees the glossy jacket illustration will know instantly who the bad guys are in the story despite the narrative’s laboriously slow reveal of that information. Fans of Hunter’s Warriors series or Jacques’ Redwall series may enjoy this, but kids who want a little more depth to their animal fantasy will want to look elsewhere." Booklist was similarly mixed in their reviews, as they praised the first book but stated that the second book had limited general appeal.

== See also ==
- Dating Hamlet - 2002 novel also by Lisa Fiedler
