= The Shape of Things (anthology) =

- cover of first edition
- Editor: Damon Knight
- Cover artist: Eugene Berman
- Language: English
- Genre: Science fiction
- Publisher: Popular Library
- Publication date: 1965
- Publication place: United States
- Media type: Print (paperback)
- Pages: 206

The Shape of Things is an anthology of science fiction short stories edited by Damon Knight. It was first published in paperback by Popular Library in 1965.

The book collects eleven short stories and novelettes by various science fiction authors, together with an introduction by the editor. The stories were previously published from 1944-1952 in various science fiction and other magazines.

== Contents ==
- "Introduction" (Damon Knight)
- "Don't Look Now" (1948) (Henry Kuttner)
- "The Box" (1949) (James Blish)
- "The New Reality" (1950) (Charles L. Harness)
- "The Eternal Now" (1944) (Murray Leinster)
- "The Sky Was Full of Ships" (1947) (Theodore Sturgeon)
- "The Shape of Things" (1948) (Ray Bradbury)
- "The Only Thing We Learn" (1949) (C. M. Kornbluth)
- "The Hibited Man" (1949) (L. Sprague de Camp)
- "Dormant" (1948) (A. E. van Vogt)
- "The Ambassadors" (1952) (Anthony Boucher)
- "A Child Is Crying" (1948) (John D. MacDonald)

== Reception ==
Jeffery A. Beaudry, reviewing the anthology in The Washington Post, characterized its general content as "stories from the late '40s and early '50s ... pulpy and populated by mad scientists, good-guy scientists and helpless young 'girls,' but ... great fun."
