= The Hibited Man =

- Short story by L. Sprague de Camp
- illustration of the story in Thrilling Wonder Stories
- Country: United States
- Language: English
- Genre: Science fiction

Publication
- Published in: Thrilling Wonder Stories
- Publisher: Standard Magazines, Inc.
- Media type: Print (Magazine)
- Publication date: October, 1949

"The Hibited Man" is a classic science fiction short story by L. Sprague de Camp. It was first published in the magazine Thrilling Wonder Stories for October, 1949. It first appeared in book form in the hardcover anthology My Best Science Fiction Story (Merlin Press, 1949). It has also appeared in the paperback anthology The Shape of Things (Popular Library, 1965).

== Plot summary ==
Thomas Otterburn, a shy, mild-mannered engineer, lets himself be talked into becoming the first human guinea pig in an experiment using a psychoelectronic device to generate an armor-shield repelling strong forces. The main concern is that the field extends inward as well as outward from the body surface, possibly affecting the brain; animal trials indicate that it may suppress inhibitions in the subject. The test on Otterburn is successful; the expected field is generated, and he claims to feel no mental effect. But he declines to remove the device afterwards, and on his way out of the lab hits on female engineer Lucy Kneipf for a date; he has always been too timid to ask her out before.

The now ultra-extroverted Otterburn takes Lucy to an expensive restaurant, where he becomes rude and offensive over what he sees as tardy service. On receiving the bill he sends Lucy on to the musical they are to attend while he forcefully disputes the liquor charge. He leaves without paying it, his personal force-field allowing him to act in relative impunity. At the theater he finds the frightened Lucy has stood him up, so he invites in a woman off the street. Unimpressed by the show, he throws tomatoes at the performers and then at the ushers when they come to kick him out. Fleeing behind the scenes he swipes a can of green paint from a scenery painter and amuses himself daubing it on half-naked chorus girls; in the ruckus created he escapes the building. Next he steals a policeman's horse for a joy ride. Abandoning it soon after, he ducks pursuit in a barbershop and contemplates more hell-raising.

The next morning Otterburn is arrested in his home; Lucy, having realized what was going on, has reported him. His laboratory bails him out, and the field-generating device is removed, but Otterburn does not revert to his former self; the effect on his mind, it seems, may be permanent. Reasoning that even in the absence of inhibitions a sense of self-interest will lead him to curb his wild behavior, the lab-workers decide it will be safe to let him go free. For his part, Otterburn is unconcerned, supremely confident in his ability to manage his own life. Quitting his position, he leaves, whistling.

Some time later the altered Otterburn checks in at his former job and reveals he talked the restaurant and theater out of pressing charges, successfully convincing them his escapades were good publicity, and talked himself into a new job as a salesman for the paint brand he had used, at twice his former engineering salary. His boss bewails the loss of one of his best scientists; his low-paid former colleagues, on the other hand, are left chagrined at his new prosperity.

== Reception ==
Jeffery A. Beaudry, reviewing the story with the other pieces in The Shape of Things, singled it out for comment along with two others, noting that he "nodded with bemused sympathy" on reading it. He characterized the general content of the anthology as "stories from the late '40s and early '50s ... "pulpy and populated by mad scientists, good-guy scientists and helpless young 'girls,' but ... great fun."

De Camp himself, at least initially, considered this story to be among his best works, self-selecting it as his entry in the anthology My Best Science Fiction Story (November 1949), and justifying his choice in the brief accompanying introduction "Why I Selected 'The Hibited Man.'"

== Relation to other works ==
De Camp took a different approach to the theme of curing shyness in the similarly-titled "The Guided Man" (1952), whose protagonist buys a service allowing experts to control his actions during difficult moments.
