= The Best Laid Schemes =

- Cover of first edition
- Author: Larry Eisenberg
- Cover artist: Jack H. Breslow
- Language: English
- Genre: Science fiction
- Publisher: Collier Books
- Publication date: 1973
- Publication place: United States
- Pages: 191

The Best Laid Schemes is an anthology of science fiction short stories by American writer Larry Eisenberg. It was published in 1973 by Collier Books.

Eisenberg's first and only science fiction book, it compiles twenty-one short stories, many of which follow the fictional biochemist Emmet Duckworth, a character compared to Homer Nearing's C. P. Ransom. One story, "What Happened to Auguste Clarot?", was originally published in Harlan Ellison's anthology Dangerous Visions while additional works were originally published in The Magazine of Fantasy and Science Fiction, If, Venture Science Fiction, Amazing Stories, and other magazines.

The anthology's short story "Too Many Cooks" was adapted into an episode of the British science fiction series Out of the Unknown.

John F. Carr called the stories in the collection humorous and "possibly what Robots Have No Tails would have been written two decades later in an academic setting."
