= Shampoo Planet =

1992 novel by Douglas Coupland

- Author: Douglas Coupland
- Language: English
- Genre: Novel
- Publisher: Pocket Books
- Publication date: 1992
- Publication place: Canada
- Media type: Print (Hardback & Paperback)
- Pages: 304 pp
- ISBN: 0-671-75505-6 (first edition, hardcover) & ISBN 0-7432-3153-8
- OCLC: 25746138
- Dewey Decimal: 813/.54 20
- LC Class: PS3553.O855 S48 1992
- Preceded by: Generation X: Tales for an Accelerated Culture
- Followed by: Life After God

Shampoo Planet is Douglas Coupland's second novel, published by Pocket Books in 1992. It is a thematic follow up to Coupland's first novel, Generation X: Tales for an Accelerated Culture. The novel deals with Tyler Johnson, a Global Teen, who shares many characteristics of the character Tyler from Generation X, the younger brother of Andy, Generation X's narrator. The novel tells the story of Tyler's life as he arrives home from Europe, and the fallout of this trip and beyond.

== Synopsis ==
=== Part One ===
Part one begins shortly after Tyler's return from a European vacation. He is in a relationship with a girl named Anna-Louise, and he dreams of working for the American defense contractor Bechtel. He is obsessed with haircare products, having a collection of different (mostly fictional) brand-name products.

The first part of the novel details Tyler's life in Lancaster, Washington. The town is a near-ghost town, after the town's largest employer, the Plants, was shut down. The effects of the Plants' shutdown has caused many problems in the town, including the boarding up of many stores in the local mall.

Tyler's family life is composed of himself, his mother, and his two siblings. He calls his mother by her first name, Jasmine. Jasmine is an ex-hippie who is married to an alcoholic man named Dan. At the very introduction of the novel, Dan divorces Jasmine. Tyler, his sister, Daisy, and his brother, Mark, band together to help Jasmine through her troubling time.

Tyler's grandparents are also introduced. They are quite wealthy, but they will not share their wealth with their family members. They have decided to start selling a product satirically labeled KittyWhip, which is a gourmet cat food product line.

=== Part Two ===
Two of Tyler's compatriots, Monique and Stephanie, from his European vacation visit him in Lancaster. Stephanie is Tyler's secret shame from Europe, having had a summer fling with her. Tyler describes his European vacation, the events that lead to him meeting Stephanie, and what he's feeling during Stephanie's visit.

Tyler's world starts to turn upside down as his grandparents lose their fortune, his mother becomes a KittyWhip salesperson, and his relationship with Anna-Louise enters a rough patch. Tyler feels himself become more drawn to Stephanie than to Anna-Louise.

=== Part Three ===
Tyler, deciding that his life in Lancaster is not interesting enough, leaves with Stephanie to live in Los Angeles. His time in Los Angeles is wrought with strife. Tyler's worst fear becomes realized as he finds himself working at a chicken fry shop manning the fryer. It is in Los Angeles that Tyler begins to comprehend advice that his mother gave him about loneliness.

== Inspiration ==
It's about a group I call the Global Teens. They're all under 25 and their greatest tribal identifier is great hair and great clothes. And they're as alien to X as X is to baby boomers.

— Coupland, The Globe and Mail, 1991

The novel is about the generation after Coupland's X generation (the latter of which is now often described as Generation Jones). The primary character, Tyler, is a "Global Teen", those "under 25" in 1991 (who ironically came to be known as Generation X in the media). They are the children of the hippie generation, who "react by loving corporations, and they don't mind wearing ties. To them, Ronald Reagan is emperor". They exist in a globally connected world marked out by advertising and corporate power. They are optimistic when compared with their siblings in the Jones/original X Generation. However, they do not have experience with leaders who show care for other people. Said Coupland: "I still remember Jimmy Carter. I still remember Pierre Trudeau. I still remember a time when society cared about other people. But there's nothing in these kids' databases to show that there are other options, that it wasn't always dog eat dog. Older people have to somehow convince young people that better things are possible."

== History of the novel ==
Being released in the shadow of Generation X, Shampoo Planet is considered another Zeitgeist-catching novel. Its depiction of the Global Teen generation is similar to the depiction of Generation X in the previous novel, yet it suffers from comparison to Generation X. Coupland himself has claimed that the novel is too contrived. However, the novel has retained its individual sense, and become a historical artifact of the times that brought about its creation.

== Popular culture ==
An episode of the show Ergo Proxy was named after the book. It was also referenced by the band Panic! at the Disco, in their songs "London Beckoned Songs About Money Written by Machines" and "I Write Sins Not Tragedies". The Japanese rock band Learners perform a song called "Shampoo Planet," written by Gakuji Matsuda.
