= Cultural references to Ophelia =

References to Shakespeare's character in Hamlet

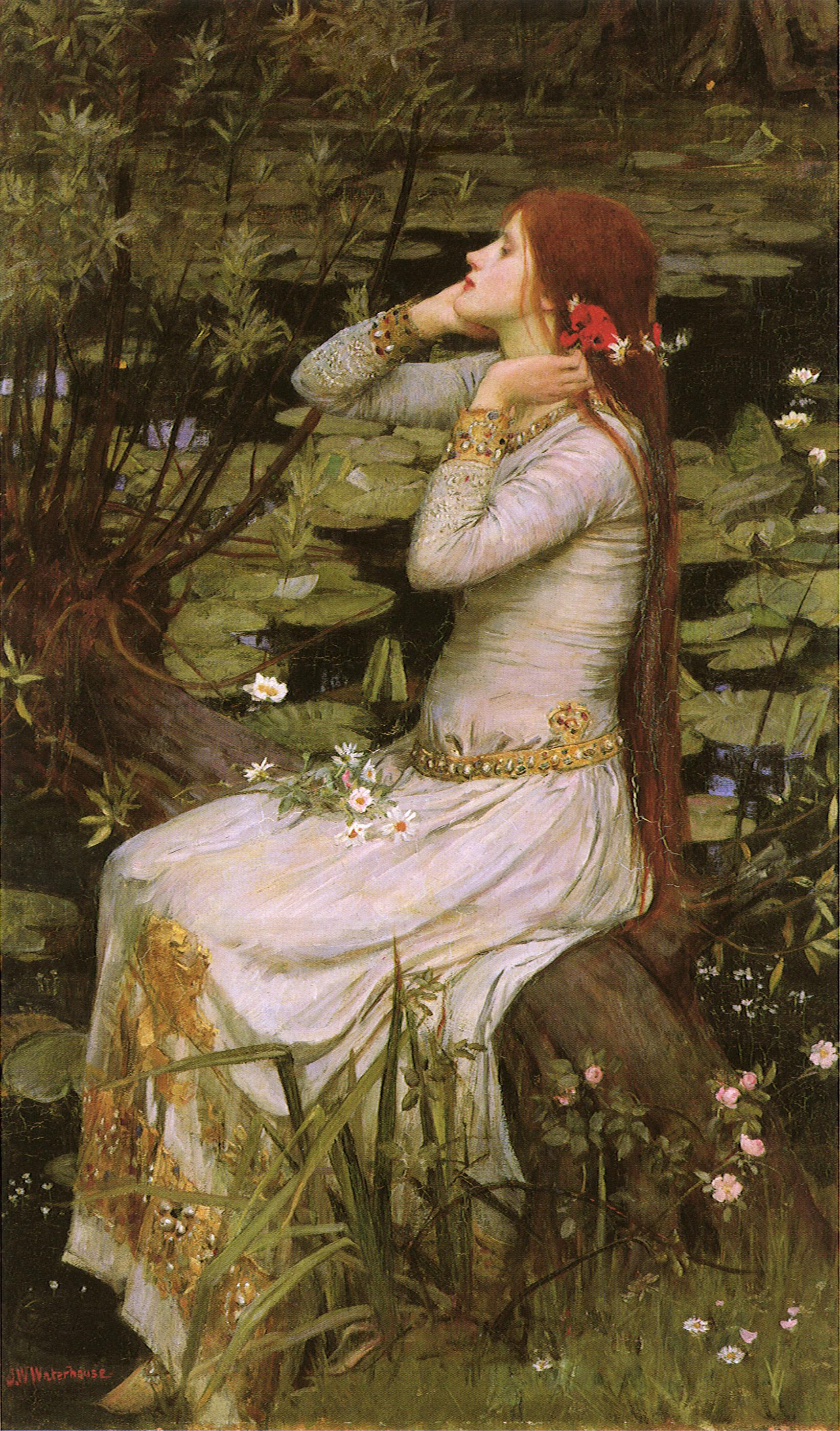
Ophelia was a favourite subject of artist John William Waterhouse.

Ophelia, a character in William Shakespeare's drama Hamlet, is often referred to in literature and the arts, often in connection to suicide, love, and/or mental instability.

== Literature ==
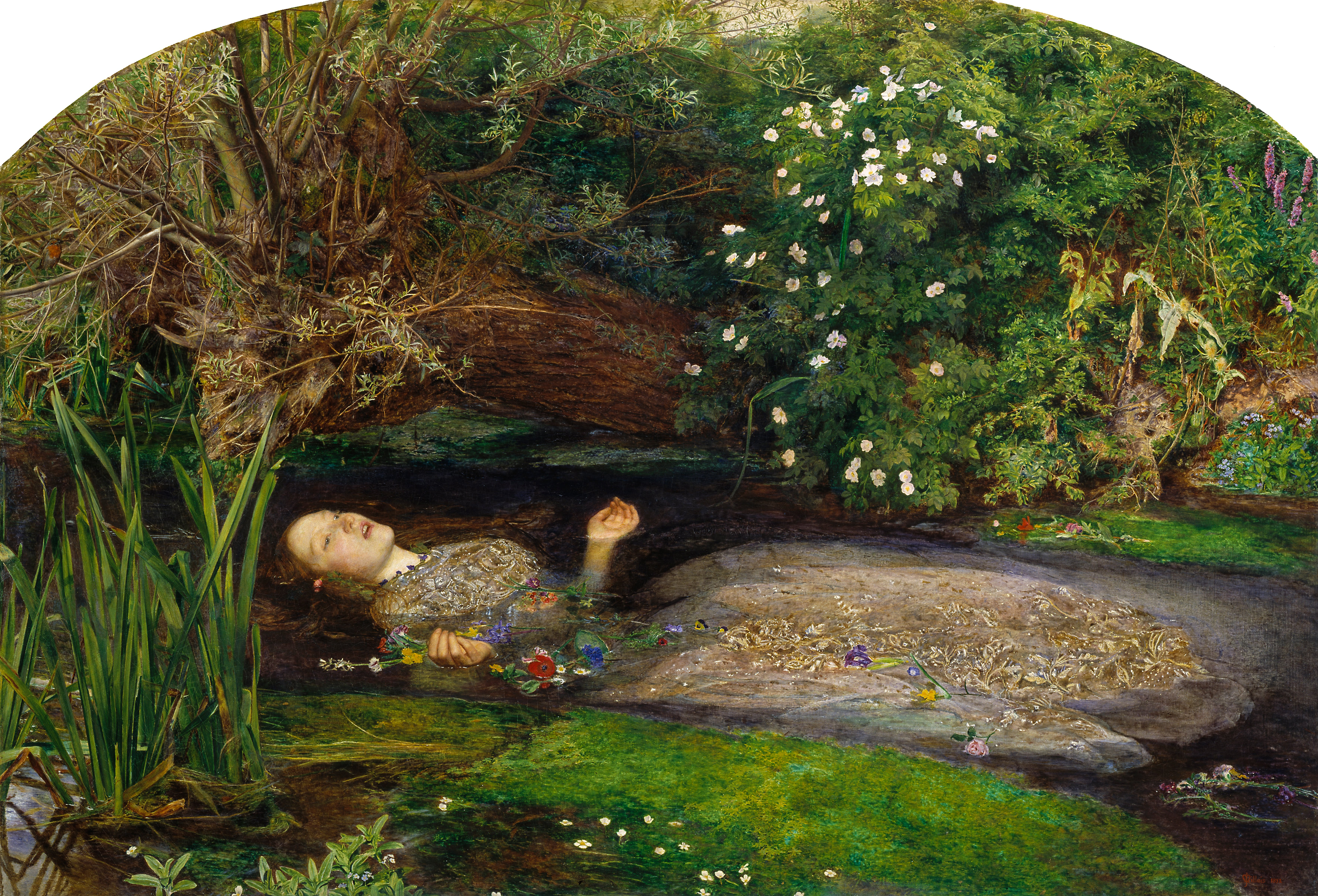
Ophelia by John Everett Millais (1852). His painting influenced the image in both Laurence Olivier's and Kenneth Branagh's films of Hamlet.

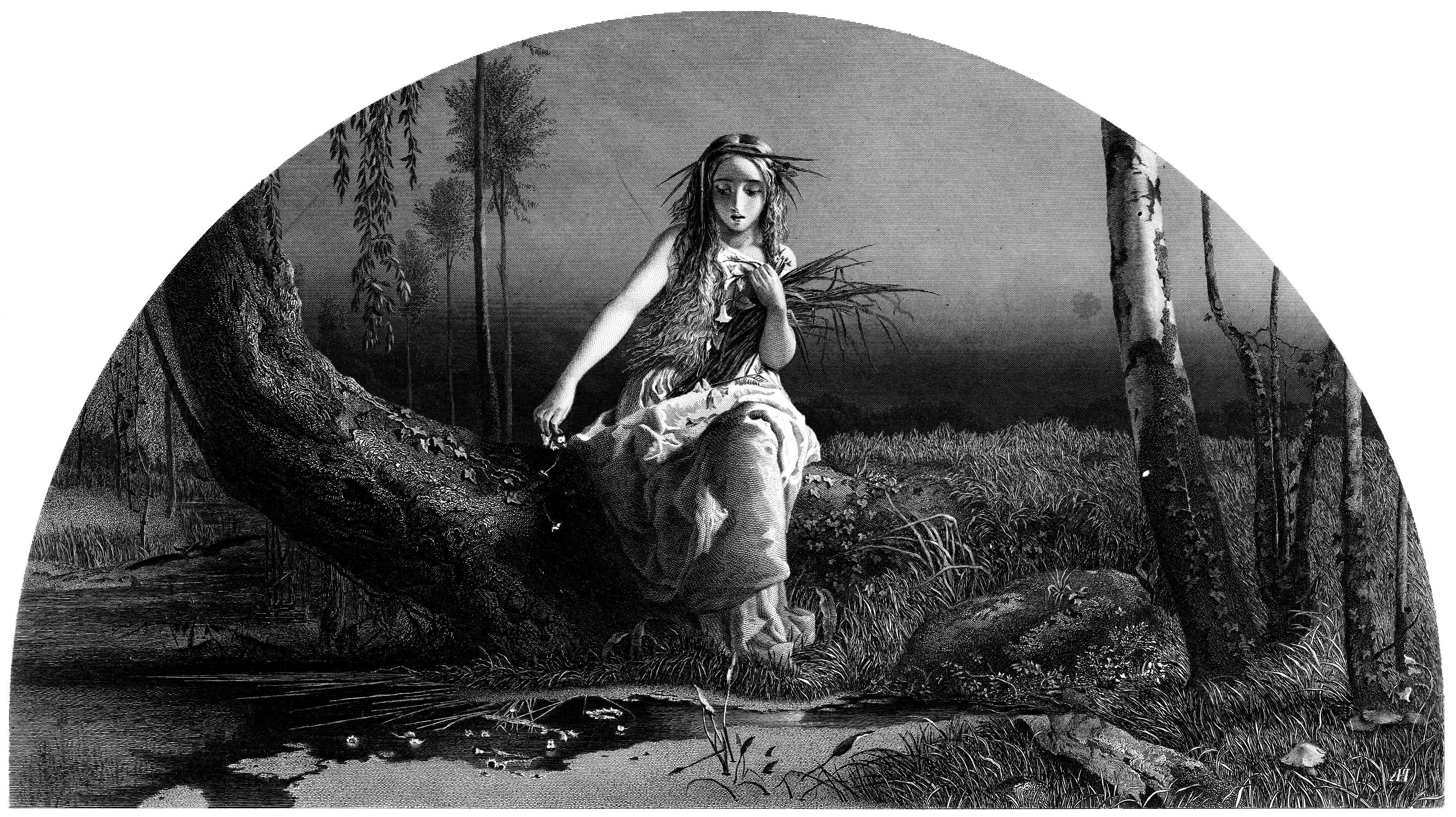
Ophelia as represented in The Works of Shakspere, with notes by Charles Knight, ca. 1873

=== Novels ===
- Russian novelist Fyodor Dostoevsky, in the first chapter of his 1880 novel The Brothers Karamazov, described a capricious young woman who committed suicide by throwing herself off a steep cliff into a river, simply to imitate Shakespeare's Ophelia. Dostoevsky concludes that "Even then, if the cliff, chosen and cherished from long ago, had not been so picturesque, if it had been merely a flat, prosaic bank, the suicide might not have taken place at all." Dostoevsky also depicts the heroine Grushenka as Ophelia, binding the two through the words "Woe is me!" in the chapter titled "The First Torment".
- Dating Hamlet (2002), by Lisa Fiedler, tells a version of Ophelia's story.
- Agatha Christie's characters refer to Ophelia in the novels After the Funeral (1953), Third Girl (1966) and Nemesis (1971).
- In Jasper Fforde's novel Something Rotten (2004) Ophelia tries to take over the play during Hamlet's excursion to the real world.
- Ophelia by Lisa Klein tells the story of Hamlet from Ophelia's point of view.
- In Paul Griffiths' novel let me tell you (2008) Ophelia tells a narrative using only her words from Hamlet, rearranged. The novel has been adapted as music by Hans Abrahamsen.

=== Poetry ===
- French poet Arthur Rimbaud wrote a poem called Ophélie in 1870, inspired by Hamlet.
- In T. S. Eliot's poem The Waste Land, several allusions are made to Ophelia's death: for example, one section is titled "Death by Water".

=== Non-fiction ===
- Mary Pipher alluded to Ophelia in the title of her nonfiction book Reviving Ophelia: Saving the Selves of Adolescent Girls. The book puts forth the thesis that modern American teenage girls are victimised, lost, and unsure of themselves, like Ophelia.

== Drama ==
- In 2011 the Department of Theatre and Performance at the Victoria and Albert Museum invited director Katie Mitchell and Leo Warner of 59 Productions to conceive and produce a video installation exploring the nature of 'truth in performance'. Taking as its inspiration five of the most influential European theatre directors of the previous century, the project examines how each of the practitioners would direct the actress playing Ophelia in the famous 'mad' scenes in the play. This multiscreen video installation, launched at the Chantiers Europe festival at the Théâtre de la Ville in Paris on 4 June, and opened at the museum on 12 July 2011.

== Film and television ==
- The television series Sons of Anarchy included several parallels to Hamlet, including Ophelia influencing the characters Tara Knowles and Opie Winston.
- In the Simpsons episode "Tales from the Public Domain", the story of Hamlet is retold using Simpsons characters. The role of Ophelia is taken by Lisa Simpson who, upon seeing Hamlet (Bart Simpson) talking to a picture of his deceased father (Homer Simpson), claims "Nobody out-crazies Ophelia!" She then backs up her claim by jumping on a table, stepping in people's food and kicking over flowers, before finally cartwheeling out a nearby window and into the moat, presumably to her death.
- In the opening montage of the 2011 film Melancholia, Kirsten Dunst's character is shown in her wedding dress, floating face up in a stream, similar to John Everett Millais' painting of Ophelia.
- In the 2005 film The Libertine, Samantha Morton portrays aspirant actress Elizabeth Barry, who portrays Ophelia, and brings the house down.
- In the 1964 The Addams Family, Morticia's sister is named Ophelia: both sisters are played by Carolyn Jones. Ophelia is depicted with flowers in her hair, and often carrying flowers, alluding to the play.
- In the second episode of the television series Desperate Romantics, Elizabeth Siddal poses for John Everett Millais' Ophelia painting.
- In the 1986 film Fire with Fire, Virginia Madsen plays a Catholic schoolgirl enthralled with John Everett Millais' depiction of Ophelia which she saw in school. She later recreated the scene for a photography project and took pictures of herself immersed in a pond.
- In the 2012 film Savages it is mentioned that the character "O" goes by "O" because she is named after Ophelia, "the bipolar chick who killed herself in Hamlet."
- In the 2006 film Pan's Labyrinth, Ofelia, the main character, alludes to the play.
- The 2013 anime Blast of Tempest has many Shakespearean elements, including references to Ophelia.
- In Queen and Country (2014) the protagonist nick-names his mentally unstable girl-friend Ophelia.
- In Agents of S.H.I.E.L.D. season 4 (2017), during its final arc "Agents of Hydra", the android Aida assumes the name "Ophelia" when inside the Framework, a reference to her unrequited infatuation with Agent Leo Fitz.

== Music ==
=== Classical works ===
- Hector Berlioz made Hamlet the subject of his composition Tristia, and titled one movement "The Death of Ophelia".
- Frank Bridge wrote a symphonic poem for orchestra titled There is a willow grows aslant a brook, taken from the first line of Gertrude's monologue recounting Ophelia's death.
- Dmitri Shostakovich's Incidental Music to Hamlet features a movement titled "Ophelia's Song", which depicts her descent into madness.
- Hans Abrahamsen's Let me tell you, a song cycle for soprano and orchestra.

=== Contemporary ===
- In The Grateful Dead song "Althea" lyricist Robert Hunter references Hamlet in a near-quote from the famous soliloquy: "To be or not to be...To sleep, perchance to dream," The line in the song reads, "Yours may be the fate of Ophelia, sleeping and perchance to dream."
- Natalie Merchant recorded a song and an album called Ophelia, inspired by the play.
- Emilie Autumn has a song and album titled Opheliac in which the singer compares herself to Ophelia, connecting to her own experiences with bipolar disorder.
- Jewel has a song titled "Innocence Maintained" from her album Spirit (1998) with the lyrics "Ophelia drowned in the water, crushed by her own weight".
- Indigo Girls recorded an album called Swamp Ophelia, placing Ophelia in the Deep South.
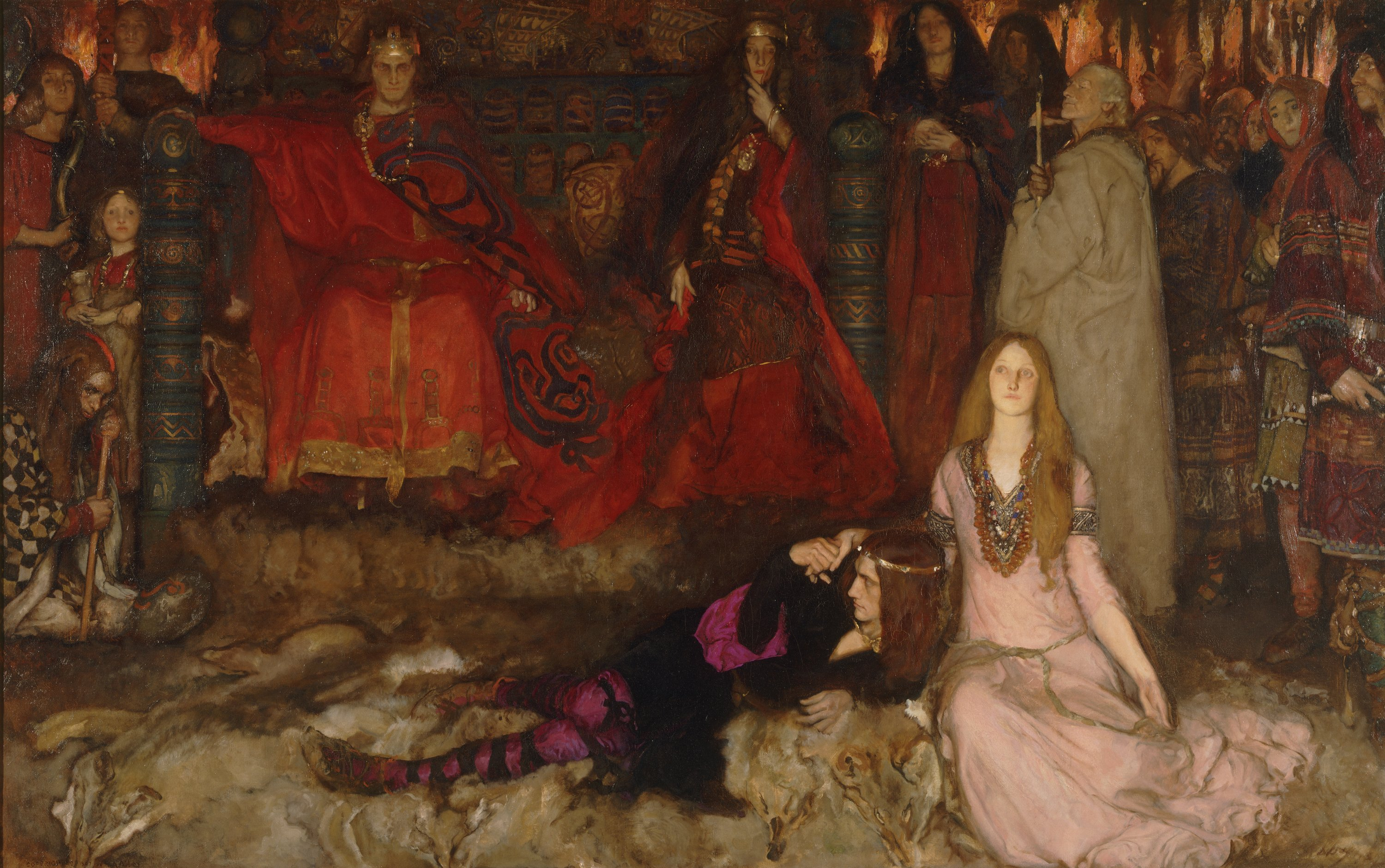
  The Play Scene in Hamlet (1897) by Edwin Austin Abbey.
- British pop singer Toyah Willcox released an album and song titled Ophelia's Shadow, focussing on Ophelia's isolation.
- Melora Creager of Rasputina recorded a song titled "Dig Ophelia" for the album Thanks for the Ether. The song "speaks for and with her".
- Tori Amos recorded a song titled "Ophelia" for the album Abnormally Attracted to Sin, perhaps inspired by Shakespeare's Ophelia.
- British band Wild Beasts' song "Bed of Nails", the second track of Smother, combine Ophelia and Hamlet with the work of Mary Shelley.
- Italian singer-songwriter Francesco Guccini recorded a song titled "Ophelia" for the album Due anni dopo.
- American singer-songwriter Bob Dylan includes Ophelia as one of the characters residing on Desolation Row in the song of the same title from the album Highway 61 Revisited, recorded in 1965.
- The steampunk band Abney Park recorded a song called "Dear Ophelia" that is sung from the point of Hamlet, writing letters to Ophelia expressing that he does, in fact, love her.
- The Band recorded a song titled "Ophelia" for the album Northern Lights – Southern Cross, in which some have interpreted Ophelia as a metaphor for race-mixing.
- French singer-songwriter Nolwenn Leroy recorded a song titled "Ophélia" for her 2012 album Ô Filles de l'eau.
- American singer-songwriter Zella Day recorded a song titled "Sweet Ophelia" for her 2014 album Zella Day – EP.
- The single titled "Ophelia" was released by The Lumineers on 4 February 2016, ahead of the release of their second album Cleopatra which was released on 8 April 2016.
- The video to the song "Where the Wild Roses Grow" by Kylie Minogue and Nick Cave is based on Ophelia by John Everett Millais.
- Gudrun Gut vocalises the role of Ophelia on Die Hamletmaschine (1990), an album by Einstürzende Neubauten, based on the 1977 play by East German author and theatre director Heiner Müller.
- The American singer-songwriter Taylor Swift references the character's death in the cover art of her 2025 album The Life of a Showgirl, which also contains the song "The Fate of Ophelia".

== Science ==
- Uranus's secondmost inner moon, discovered by Voyager 2 in 1986, was named after Ophelia. It is one of the smallest moons in the Solar System (with a diameter of only 16 km).
- 171 Ophelia is an asteroid in the asteroid belt.

== Video games ==
- In The Sims 2, one of the three pre-made neighborhoods, Strangetown, is home to a Sim named Ophelia Nigmos, while another pre-made neighborhood, Veronaville, is based entirely on the plays of William Shakespeare. Ophelia Nigmos's late mother was named Willow Nigmos; in Hamlet, Ophelia drowned in a river after falling from a willow tree.
- Brütal Legend features a supporting character named Ophelia, voiced by Jennifer Hale. Her name and story are references to the plot of Hamlet.
- Elsinore retells Hamlet from the point of view of Ophelia, who is caught in a time loop that always results in her death and seeks to escape it while investigating mysteries in the castle.

== Art ==
=== Arthur Hughes ===
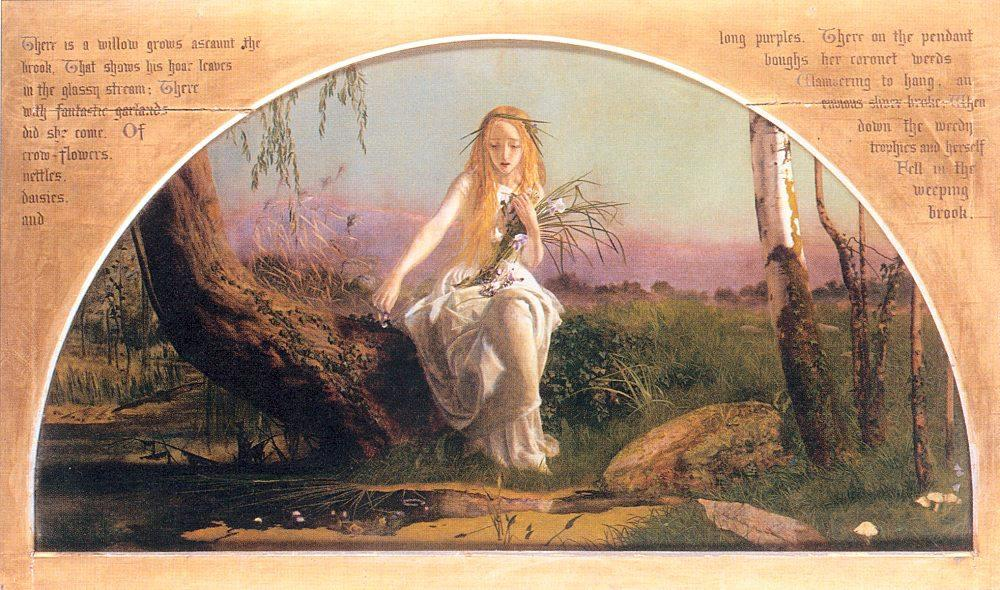
1851

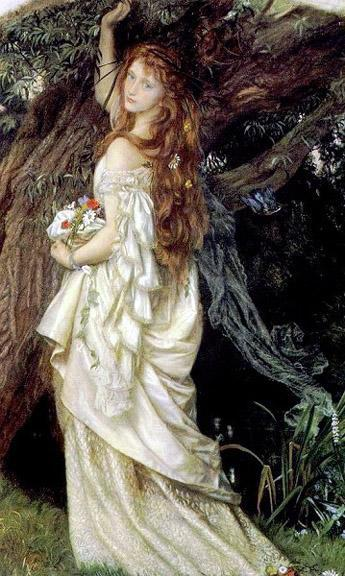
1863

=== John William Waterhouse ===
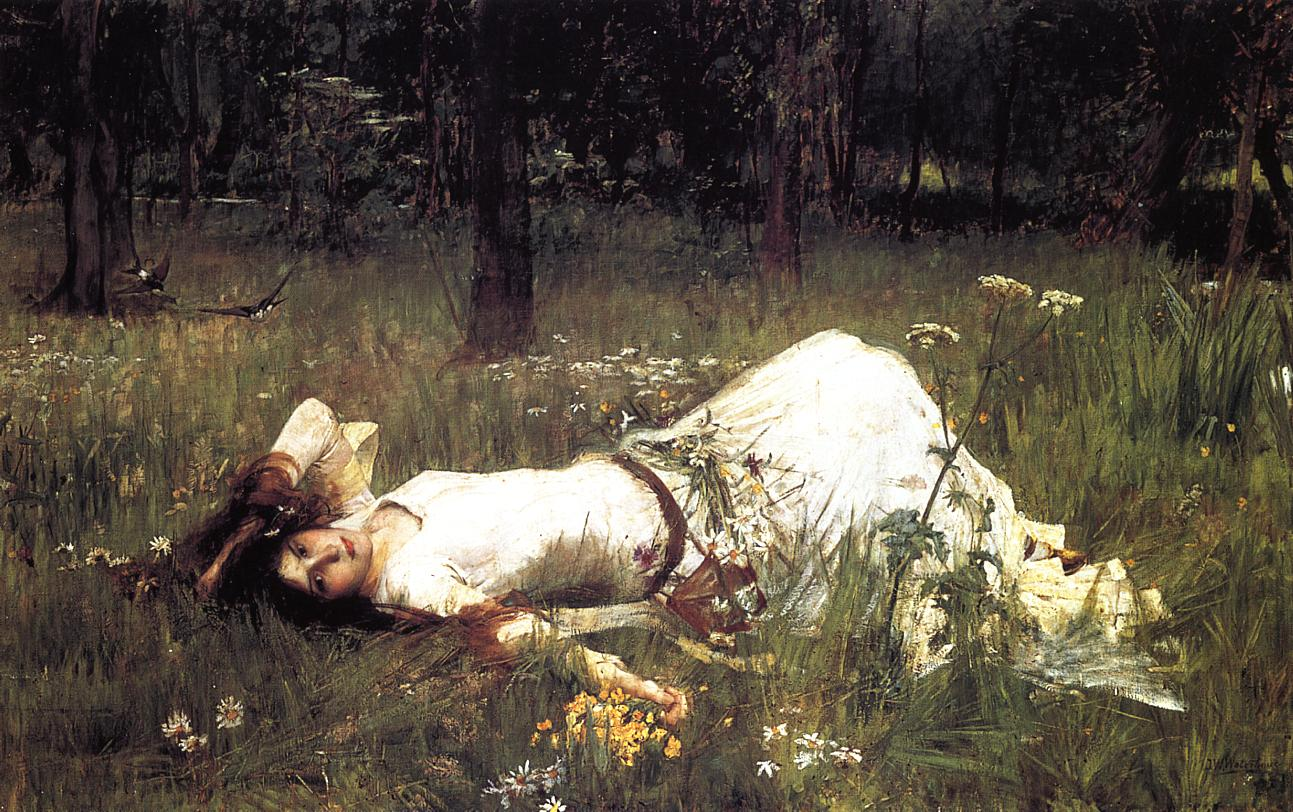
1889

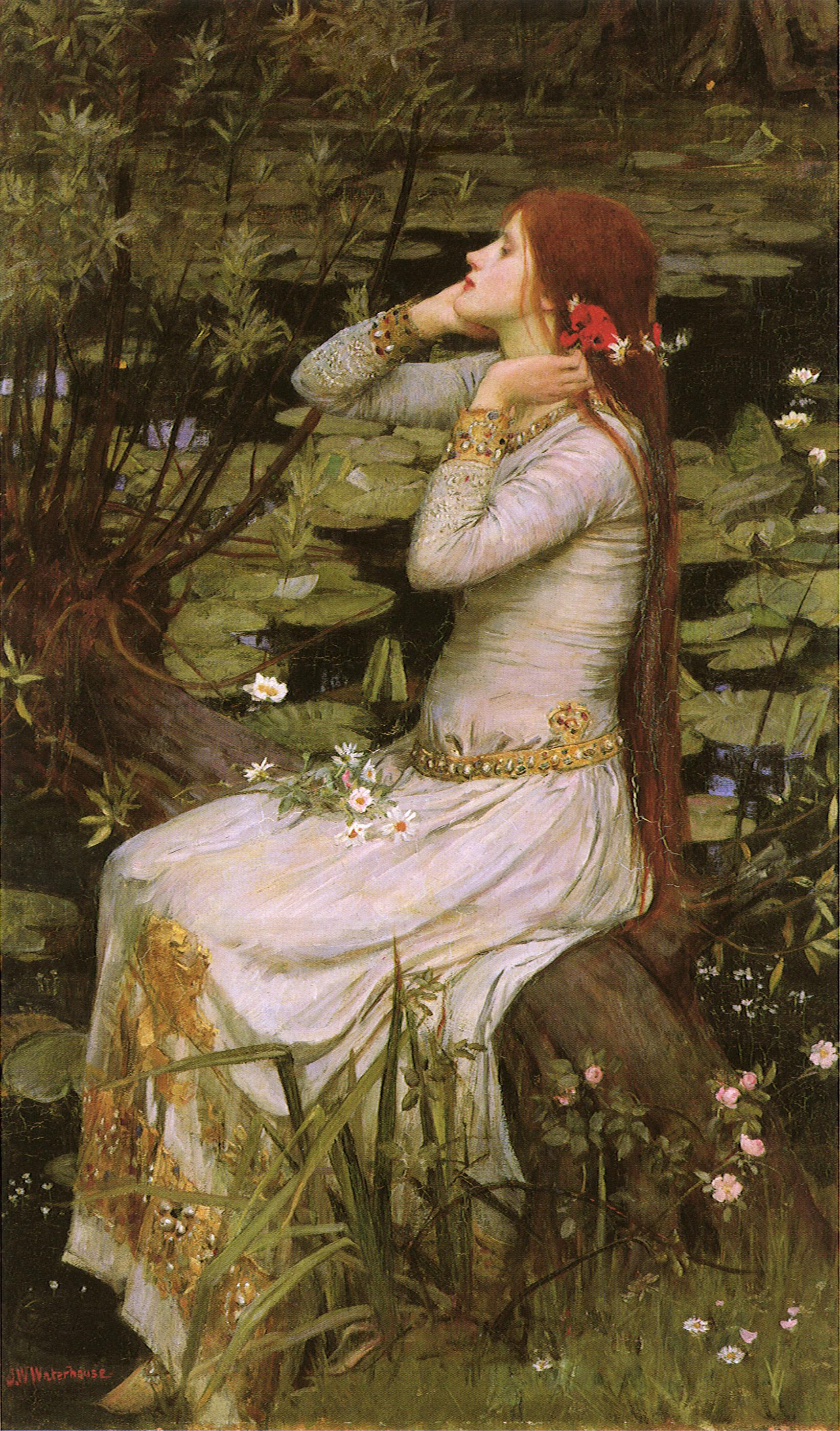
1894

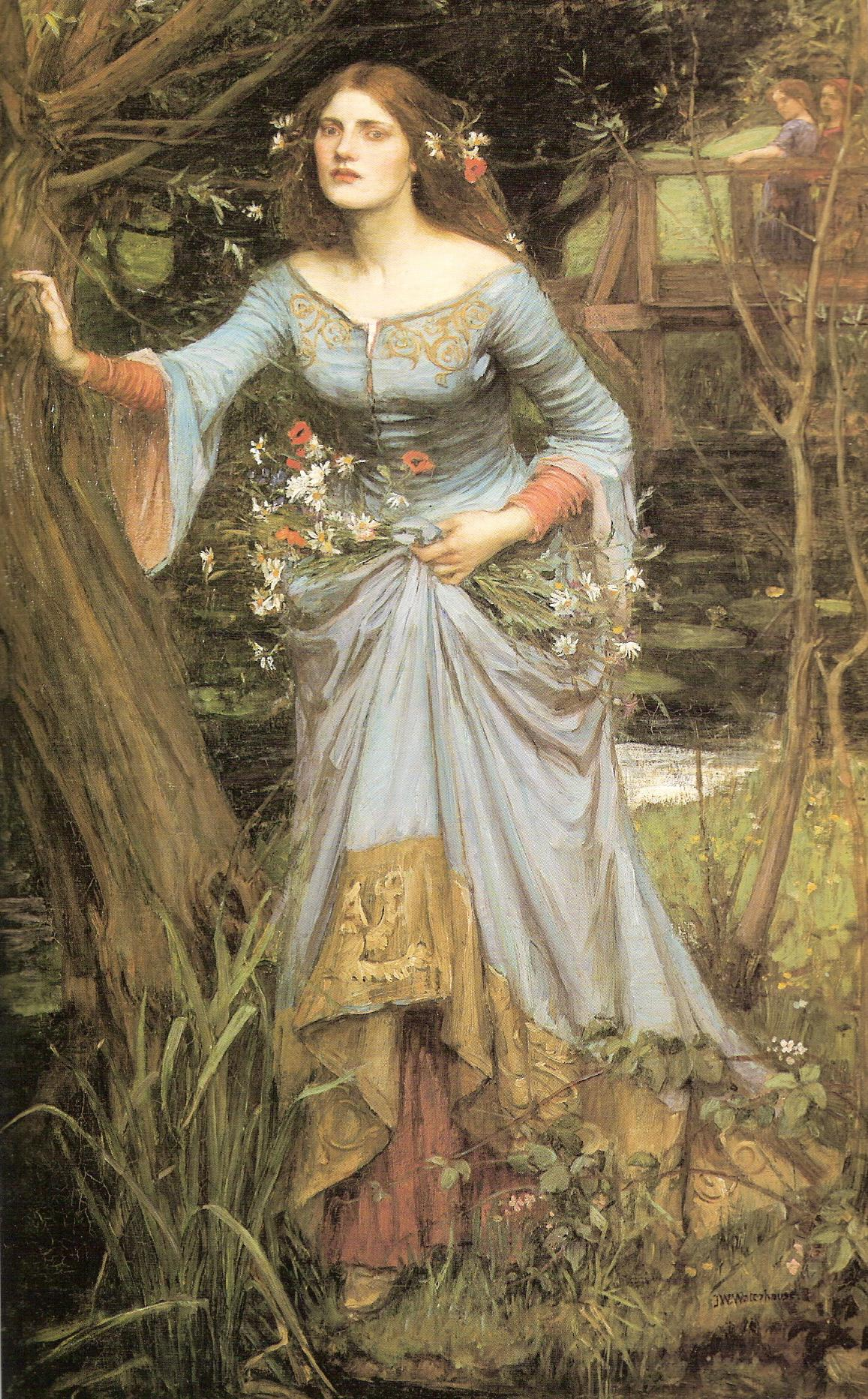
1910

=== Other artists ===
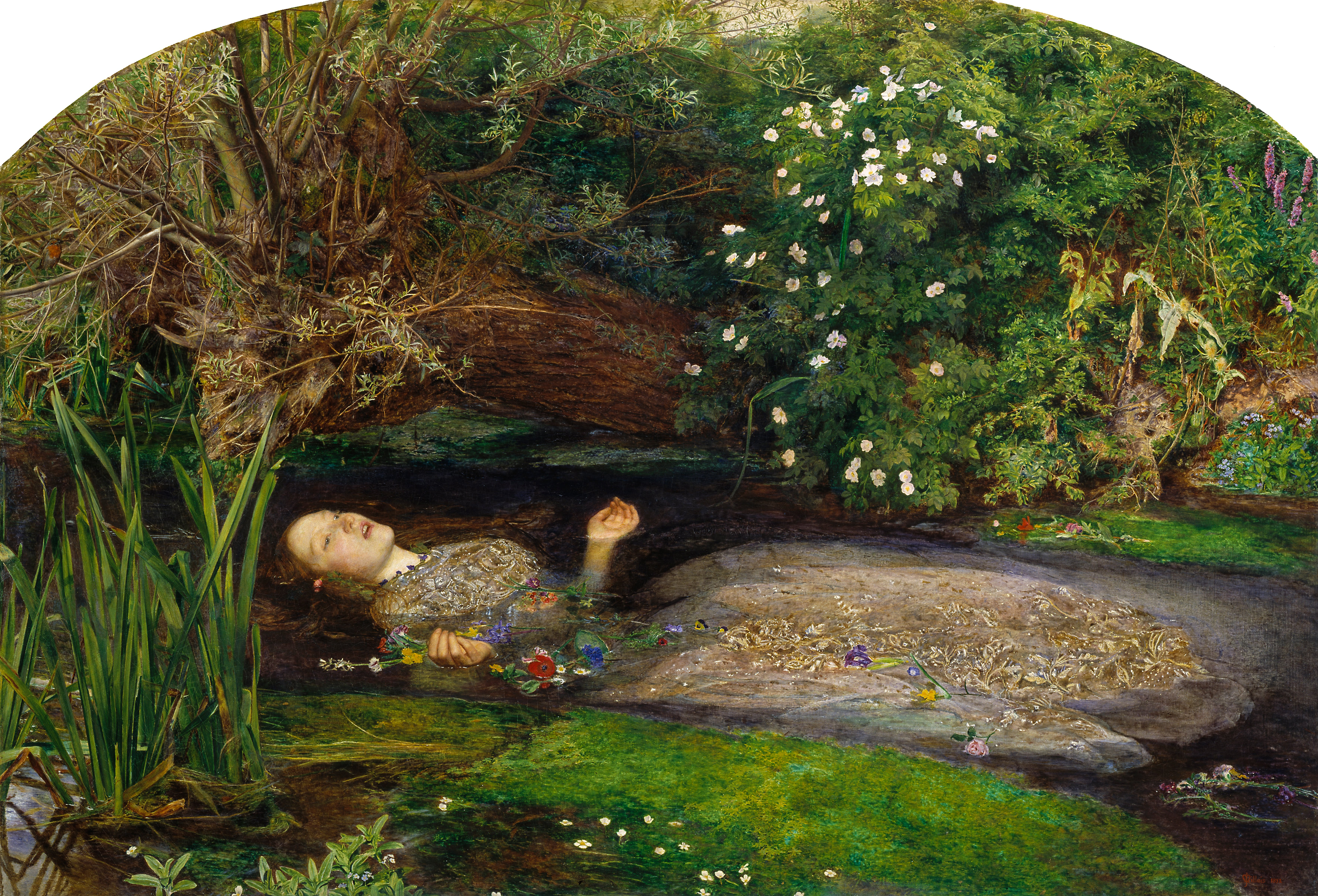
John Everett Millais
1852

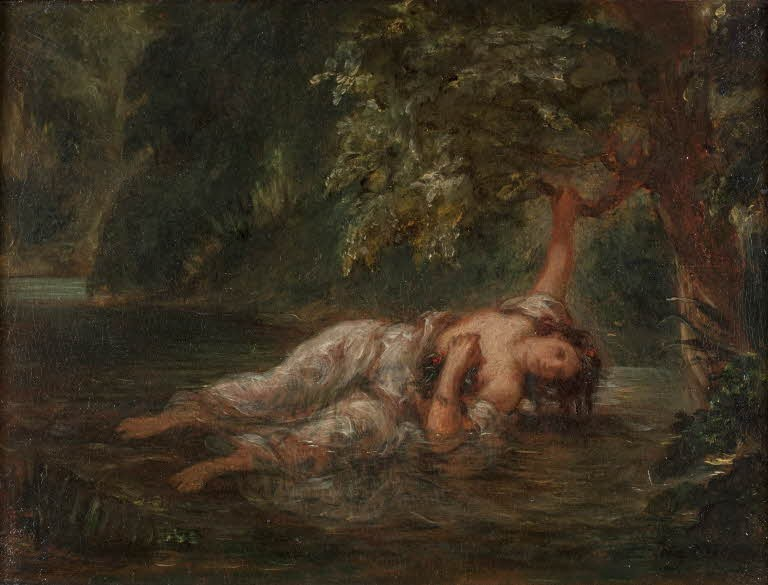
Eugène Delacroix
1853

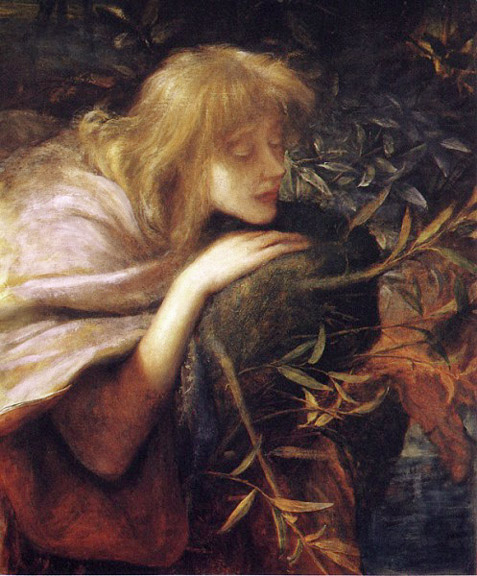
George Frederic Watts
1864

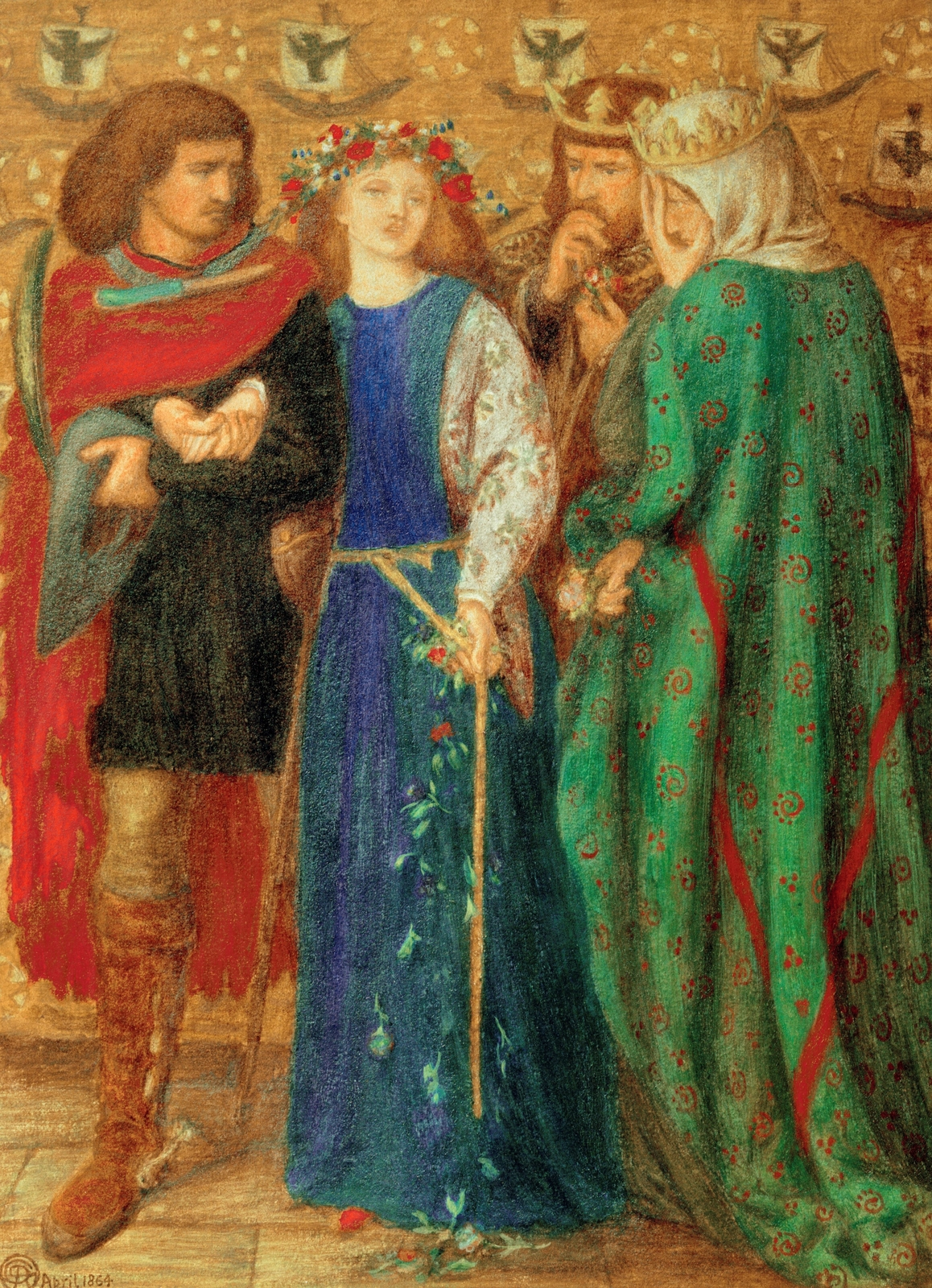
Dante Gabriel Rossetti
1864

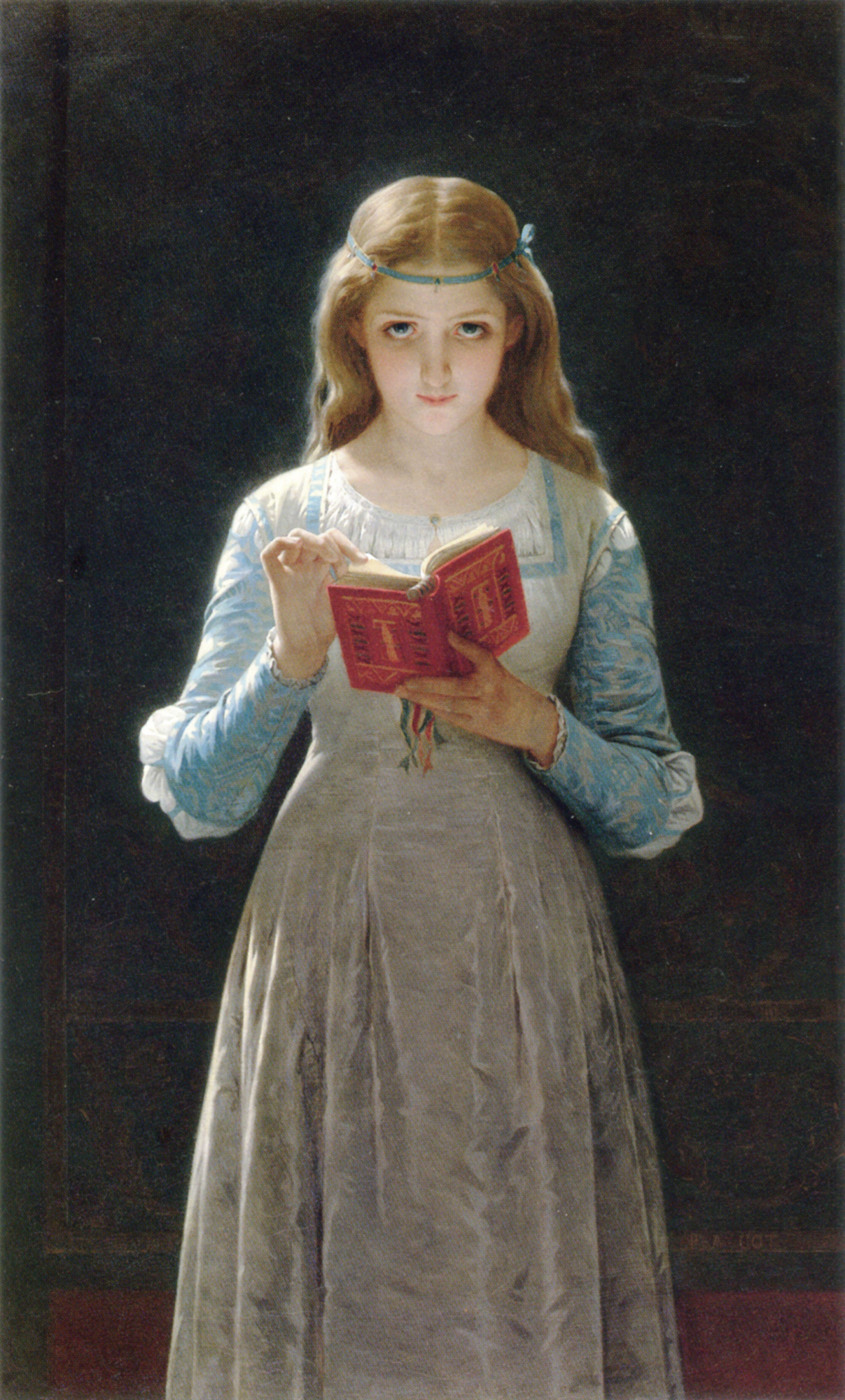
Pierre Auguste Cot
1870

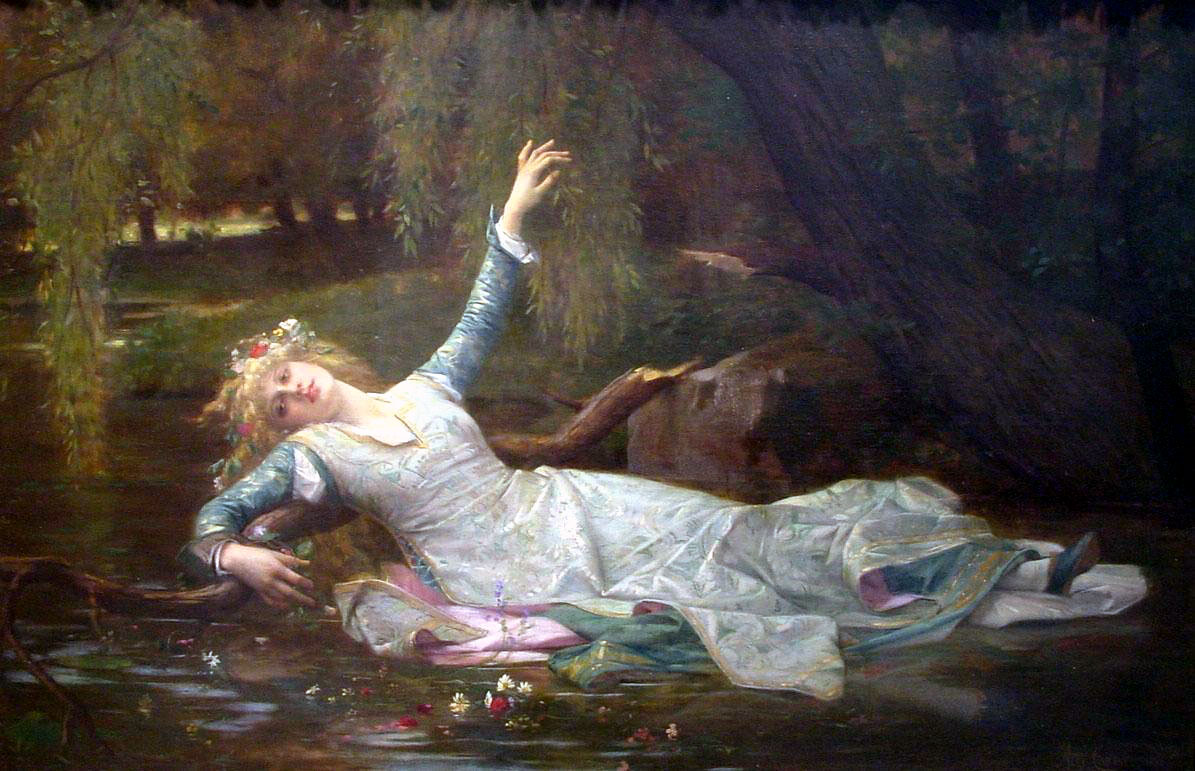
Alexandre Cabanel
1883

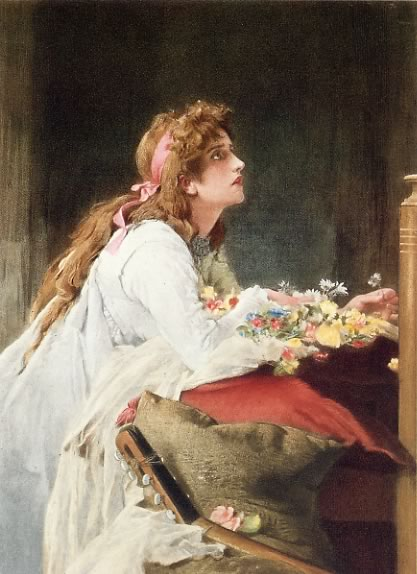
Marcus Stone
1888

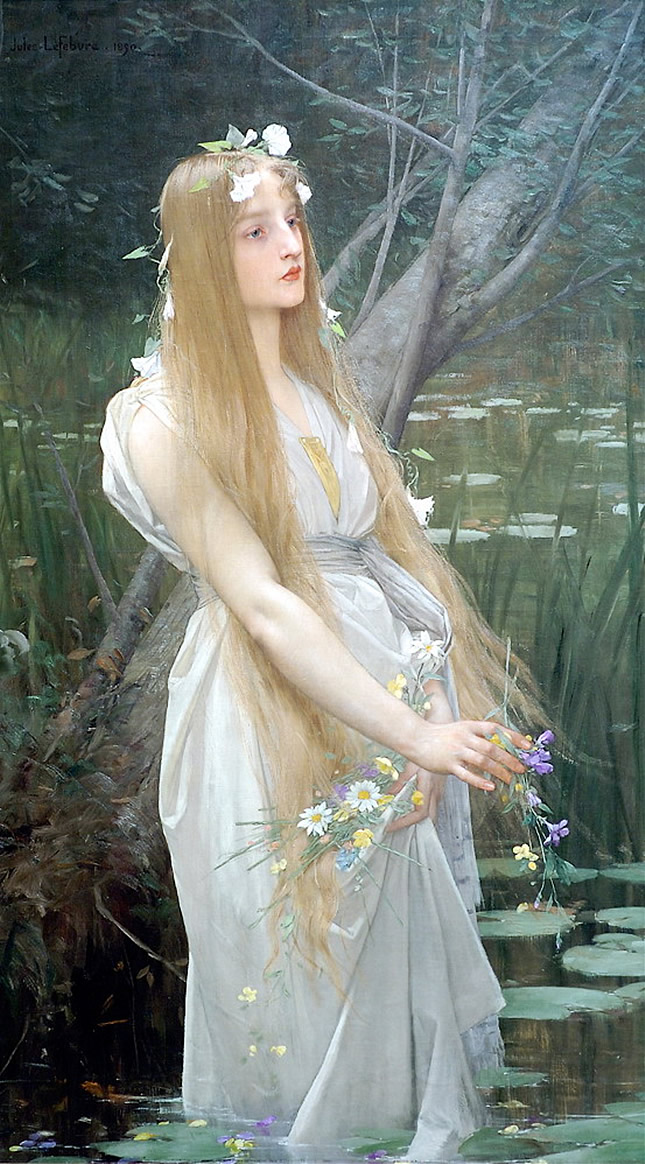
Jules Joseph Lefebvre
1890

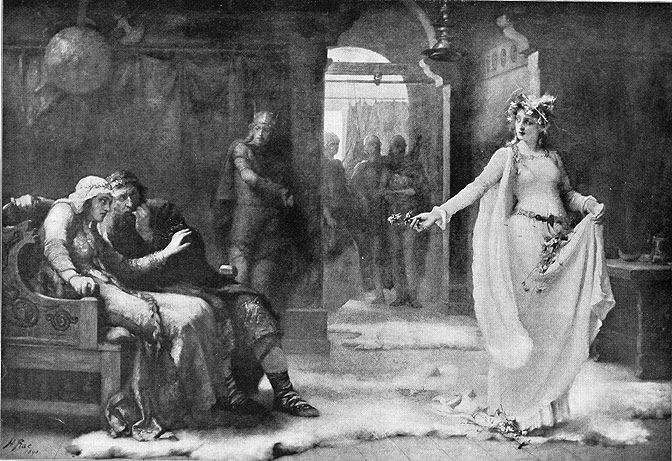
Henrietta Rae
1890
