= Dating Hamlet =

2002 novel by Lisa Fiedler

- Author: Lisa Fiedler
- Language: English
- Genre: Historical, Novel
- Publisher: Henry Holt & Co.
- Publication date: November 2002
- Publication place: United States
- Media type: Print (Hardback & Paperback)
- Pages: 176 p. (hardback edition)
- ISBN: 0-8050-7054-0 (hardback edition)
- OCLC: 50155519
- LC Class: PZ7.F457 Dat 2002

Dating Hamlet is a novel written by Lisa Fiedler, first published in 2002. It is an example of novels that rewrite Shakespeare's plays to reflect the concerns of teenagers.

== Plot ==
The plot of the story is largely the same as Shakespeare's Hamlet, but with a few twists in the tale. The story centres on Ophelia and her views on the activities taking place in Denmark and how they affect Hamlet. The author turns the story on its head by making Ophelia the heroine of the story. She is the one who comes up with the plans to save Hamlet. She is the one who proves to be brave, while Hamlet appears weak and is left to follow.

The novel is a retelling of Hamlet from Ophelia's point of view.

== See also ==
- Mouseheart - children's book series also by Lisa Fiedler

== Sources ==
- "Dating Hamlet: Ophelia's Story by Lisa Fiedler". Kirkus Reviews. November 1, 2002.
- Wetmore, Kevin J. Jr. (2011). "Shakespeare and Teenagers". In Burnett, Mark Thornton; Streete, Adrian; Wray, Ramona (eds.). The Edinburgh Companion to Shakespeare and the Arts. Edinburgh: Edinburgh University Press. pp. 377–387. ISBN 978-0-7486-4934-1.
