= Interplanetary Hunter =

1956 collection of science fiction short stories by Arthur K. Barnes

- Dust-jacket from the first edition
- Author: Arthur K. Barnes
- Cover artist: W. I. van der Poel and Ed Emshwiller
- Language: English
- Genre: Science fiction
- Publisher: Gnome Press
- Publication date: 1956
- Publication place: United States
- Media type: Print (hardback)
- Pages: 231
- OCLC: 2270591

Interplanetary Hunter is a 1956 collection of science fiction short stories by American writer Arthur K. Barnes. It was first published by Gnome Press in 1956 in an edition of 4,000 copies, and later reissued in paperback by Ace Books in 1972. German editions appeared in 1957, and an Italian edition in 1981. An expanded e-book edition, including all nine stories featuring the title character, appeared in 2009 as The Complete Interplanetary Huntress.

The collection contains stories about Barnes' character Gerry Carlyle. The stories all originally appeared in the magazine Thrilling Wonder Stories under different titles.

Galaxy reviewer Floyd C. Gale reported that, despite the stories' age, they remained "surprisingly readable." Anthony Boucher found the stories to be "a good deal of innocent fun" despite being "old-fashioned." P. Schuyler Miller similarly found the collection to be "pure entertainment," characterizing the stories as "old-line space melodramas . . . good fun in their time, and popular, but by no means outstanding." Miller also praised the Emshwiller illustrations for the individual stories.

== Contents ==
- "Venus"
- "Jupiter"
- "Neptune"
- "Almussen’s Comet"
- "Saturn"
