= Larry Eisenberg =

American novelist

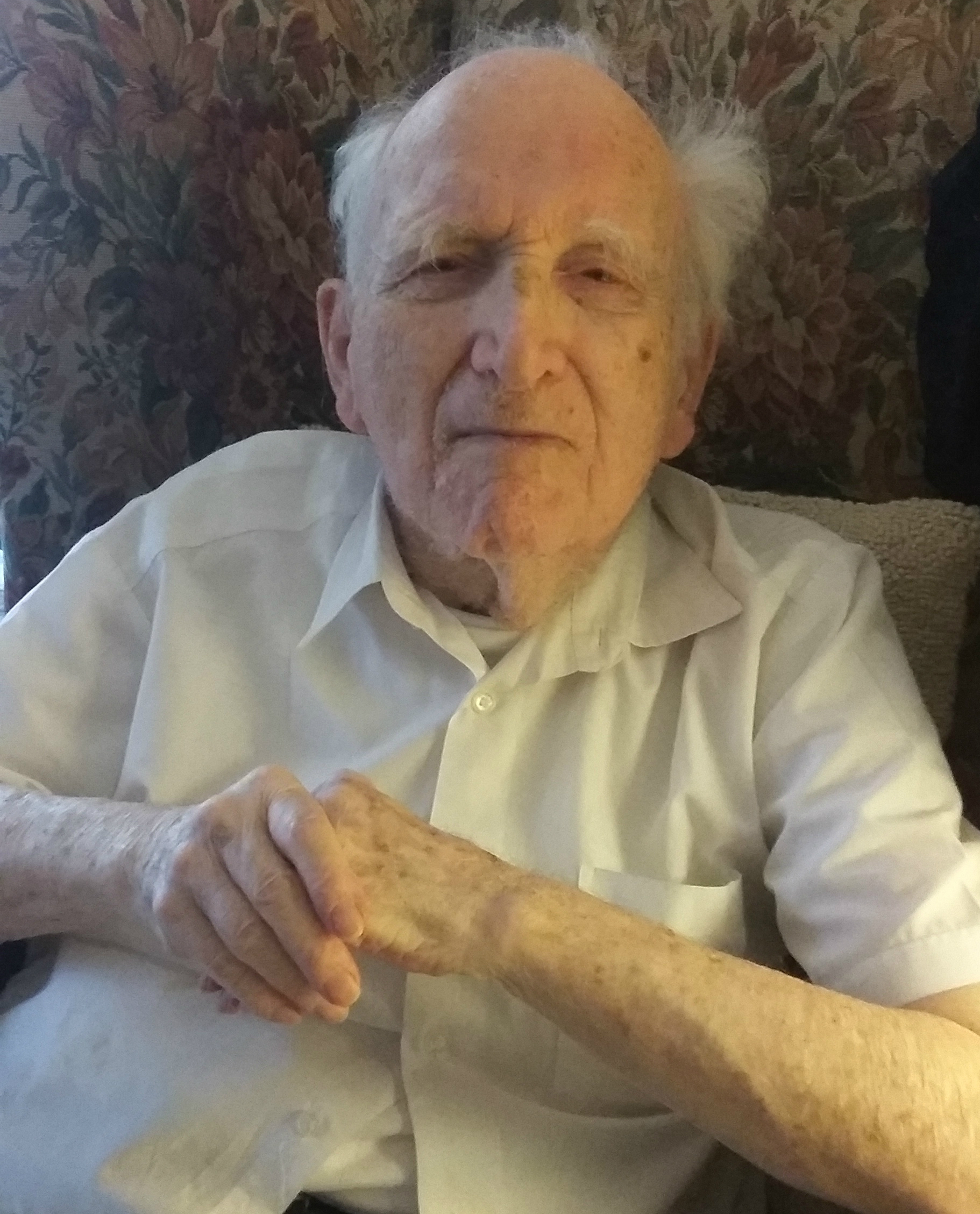
- 2016 photo
- Born: December 21, 1919; New York City, New York, U.S.
- Died: December 25, 2018 (aged 99); Lincoln, Massachusetts, U.S.
- Education: City College of New York; Polytechnic Institute of Brooklyn
- Occupations: Engineer; professor; science fiction writer
- Spouse: Frances Brenner (m. 1950; died 2017)
- Children: 2
- Writing career
- Genres: Science fiction; short stories; limericks
- Notable work: "What Happened to Auguste Clarot?"

Lawrence Eisenberg (December 21, 1919 – December 25, 2018) was an American biomedical engineer and science fiction writer. He is best known for his short story "What Happened to Auguste Clarot?", published in Harlan Ellison's anthology Dangerous Visions. He also wrote limericks, and later in life, he became known for the poems that he posted in the comments sections of various articles in The New York Times.

Eisenberg's stories have been printed in a number of leading science fiction magazines, including The Magazine of Fantasy & Science Fiction, Galaxy Science Fiction, and Asimov's Science Fiction. His stories have been reprinted in anthologies such as Great Science Fiction of the 20th Century, The 10th Annual of the Year’s Best S-F, and Great Science Fiction By the World's Great Scientists.

== Life ==
Eisenberg was born in the Bronx in 1919 to Sidney Eisenberg, a furniture salesman, and Yetta Yellen, and grew up during the Great Depression. Eisenberg graduated from James Monroe High School in the Bronx, then attended City College of New York, where he earned bachelor's degrees in electrical engineering and in mathematics, before going to Polytechnic Institute of Brooklyn, where he received a master's degree and a Ph.D. in electronics. After serving as a radar operator in the Army Air Forces during World War II, Eisenberg married Frances Brenner, a political scientist and social worker, in 1950; she died in 2017. They had one daughter and one son. The couple had lived for many years on the Upper East Side of Manhattan, but by the time of Eisenberg's death he had been living in Somerville, Massachusetts. He died from acute myeloid leukemia on December 25, 2018, at a hospice in Lincoln, Massachusetts. The New York Times ran an obituary with the headline "Larry Eisenberg, 99, Dead; His Limericks Were Very Well Read".

Eisenberg was for many years a biomedical engineer at Rockefeller University, where he and Dr. Robert Schoenfeld were co-heads of the Electronics Laboratory, and taught there until 2000. He designed the first transistorized radio-frequency coupled cardiac pacemaker circa 1960, in collaboration with Dr. Alexander Mauro. It is on display at Caspary Hall, Rockefeller University.

Meet Larry Eisenberg, a feature-length documentary about Eisenberg's life, is in production.

== Writing ==
Eisenberg published his first short story, "Dr. Beltzov's Polyunsaturated Kasha Oil Diet", in Harper's Magazine in 1962. His first science fiction publication was later that year with his story "The Mynah Matter" in the August 1962 Fantastic Stories of Imagination, with Eisenberg debuting alongside Roger Zelazny.

Shortly after that, Eisenberg began publishing his stories in many of the leading science fiction magazines of the day, including The Magazine of Fantasy & Science Fiction, Galaxy Science Fiction, and If. Eisenberg's science fiction takes a humorous approach to storytelling. As Eisenberg has said, "I enjoy wedding humor with science fiction, particularly where some unsavory aspect of our society can be pricked."

Many of Eisenberg's stories feature his character Professor Emmet Duckworth, a research scientist and two-time winner of the Nobel Prize. Duckworth's "bright ideas seem great at first but always end in disaster" with one of the professor's many inventions being "an addictive aphrodisiac clocking in at 150,000 calories per ounce —along with a propensity to turn those taking it into walking bombs." A number of the Duckworth stories were collected in Eisenberg's short story collection, The Best Laid Schemes, published in 1971 by MacMillan.

Eisenberg is best known for his short story "What Happened to Auguste Clarot?," which was published in the anthology Dangerous Visions edited by Harlan Ellison. His stories have also been reprinted in anthologies such as Great Science Fiction of the 20th Century, The 10th Annual of the Year’s Best SF, and Great Science Fiction By the World's Great Scientists.

He published two books of limericks (both with George Gordon) in 1965: Limericks for the Loo and Limericks for Lantzmen; and one collection of short stories, Best Laid Schemes. Latterly he gained a cult following for the limericks he posted in the comments sections of various New York Times articles, which numbered over 13,000 by the time of his death. In 2012, then-opinion editor Andrew Rosenthal called him "the closest thing this paper has to a poet in residence".

Eisenberg wrote the following limerick about his life

A nonagenarian, I,
A sometime writer of sci-fi,
Biomed engineer,
Gen’rally of good cheer,

With lim’ricks in ready supply.

From a New York Times reader: "The Eisenberg Certainty Principle":

There once was a poet named Larry
Whose thoughts one could never quite parry
For when Larry had spoken
The mold it was broken
Though the topics invariably vary.

== Adaptations ==
Eisenberg's short stories The Fastest Draw and Too Many Cooks were adapted for the second series of the BBC2 television science fiction anthology series Out of the Unknown, first broadcast on 8 and 15 December 1966 respectively. Both episodes are now lost.

== Bibliography ==
=== Short story collection ===
- The Best Laid Schemes, MacMillan, New York, 1971.

=== Limericks and other books ===
- Limericks for Lantzmen (1965) with George Gordon.
- Limericks for the Loo (July 1966) with George Gordon.
- Games People Shouldn't Play (November 1966) with George Gordon.

=== Selected short fiction ===
- "Dr. Beltzov's Polyunsaturated Kasha Oil Diet", Harper's Magazine, 1962.
- "The Mynah Matter", Fantastic, August 1962.
- "The Fastest Draw", Amazing Stories, October 1963. Reprinted in Tin Stars, edited by Isaac Asimov, Martin H. Greenberg, Charles G. Waugh, NAL Signet, 1986.
- "The Marvelous Marshal", The Best Laid Schemes by Larry Eisenberg, Macmillan, 1971.
- "The Pirokin Effect", Amazing Stories, June 1964. Reprinted in The 10th Annual of the Year's Best S-F, edited by Judith Merril.
- "The Scent of Love", Fantastic, August 1964.
- "The Two Lives of Ben Coulter", The Magazine of Fantasy & Science Fiction, April 1967.
- "Conqueror", If, October 1967.
- "The Saga of DMM", The Magazine of Fantasy & Science Fiction, December 1967.
- "What Happened to Auguste Clarot?" Dangerous Visions edited by Harlan Ellison, Doubleday, 1967.
- "The Time of His Life", The Magazine of Fantasy & Science Fiction, April 1968. Reprinted in Alpha 1 edited by Robert Silverberg, 1970; Arbor House Treasury of Modern SF edited by Robert Silverberg, Martin H. Greenberg, Arbor House, 1980; Great Science Fiction of the 20th Century edited by Robert Silverberg, Martin H. Greenberg, Avenel Books, 1987.
- "The Open Secrets", Galaxy Science Fiction, May 1969.
- "Hold Your Fire!", Venture Science Fiction, May 1969.
- "Project Amnion", Venture Science Fiction, August 1969.
- "IQ Soup", Venture Science Fiction, November 1969.
- "A Matter of Time and Place", The Magazine of Fantasy & Science Fiction, January 1970.
- "The Cameleon", The Magazine of Fantasy & Science Fiction, March 1970. Reprinted in American Government Through Science Fiction edited by Joseph D. Olander, Martin H. Greenberg, and Patricia S. Warrick, McNally, 1974; Election Day 2084: Science Fiction Stories About the Future of Politics edited by Isaac Asimov and Martin H. Greenberg, Prometheus, 1984;
- "The Quintopods", If, September/October 1970
- "A Matter of Recordings", If, February 1970.
- "Human Element", If, May/June 1970.
- "The Fifth Planet", If, July/August 1970.
- "The Orgy", Venture Science Fiction, August 1970.
- "Duckworth and the Sound Probe", Galaxy Science Fiction, July/August 1971.
- "Heart of the Giant", Worlds of Tomorrow, Spring 1971.
- "The Buyer", Galaxy Science Fiction, May/June 1971.
- "The Teacher", Galaxy Science Fiction, January 1971.
- "The Grand Illusions", Galaxy Science Fiction, May/June 1972.
- "The Executive Rat", Worlds of If Science Fiction, November/December 1972. Reprinted in Psy-Fi One: An Anthology of Psychology in Science Fiction edited by Kenneth B. Melvin, Stanley L. Brodsky, and Raymond D. Fowler Jr., Random House, 1977.
- "Sikh, Sikh, Sikh", Vertex: The Magazine of Science Fiction, December 1973.
- "The Merchant", Worlds of If Science Fiction, September/October 1973. Reprinted in Flying Saucers edited by Isaac Asimov, Martin H. Greenberg, and Charles G. Waugh Fawcett Crest, Ballantine/Fawcett Crest, 1982/1987.
- "Elephants Sometimes Forget", The Magazine of Fantasy & Science Fiction, September 1974.
- "Televerite", Vertex: The Magazine of Science Fiction, April 1974.
- "The Look Alike Revolution", The Magazine of Fantasy & Science Fiction, November 1974.
- "The Money Machine", Vertex: The Magazine of Science Fiction, August 1974.
- "Time and Duckworth", Galaxy Science Fiction, May 1974.
- "The Baby", Galaxy Science Fiction, March 1974. Reprinted in Psy-Fi One: An Anthology of Psychology in Science Fiction edited by Kenneth B. Melvin, Stanley L. Brodsky, and Raymond D. Fowler Jr., Random House, 1977.
- "Dr. Snow Maiden", The Magazine of Fantasy & Science Fiction, August 1975. Reprinted in Great Science Fiction By the World's Great Scientists, edited by Isaac Asimov, Martin H. Greenberg, and Charles G. Waugh, Donald I. Fine, 1985.
- "The Spurious President", Vertex: The Magazine of Science Fiction, April 1975
- "My Random Friend", The Magazine of Fantasy & Science Fiction, August 1977
- "The Interface", The Magazine of Fantasy & Science Fiction, August 1978.
- "Djinn & Duckworth", Isaac Asimov's Science Fiction Magazine, March 1979.
- "Me and My Shadow", The Magazine of Fantasy & Science Fiction, February 1986.
- "Live It Up, Inc.", The Magazine of Fantasy & Science Fiction, March 1988.
