= Monoral =

Japanese band

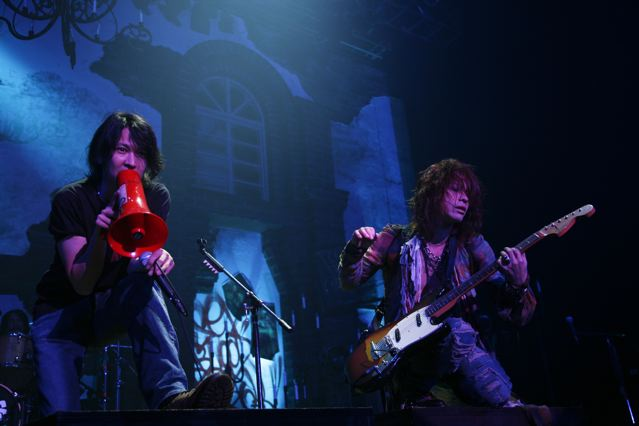
- Monoral in concert

Background information
- Origin: Tokyo, Japan
- Genres: Alternative rock; post-grunge
- Years active: 1999–2010, 2013–2017
- Label: Vamprose
- Members: Anis Shimada; Ali Morizumi
- Website: Official website

Monoral was a Japanese alternative rock band signed to Sony Music Japan. The band consisted of Anis Shimada (lead vocals and guitar) and Ali Morizumi (bass, guitar and keyboards).

== Members ==
Anis, the band's lead singer, born on February 23, 1975, is a British musician who speaks Japanese, English, French, and Arabic. Born in London, England to a Japanese father and a Moroccan-French mother, and raised in France, Anis was first discovered by Tetsuya Komuro, with whom he released a debut single in 1994 under the name of Aniss. He used to be a fashion model, as well as a MTV show host. He also used to support some famous musicians performing on TV as a guitarist. He is often involved with the creation of TV commercial songs, singing backup for other famous musicians, writing English lyrics and helping other artists as an English supervisor.

Ali, born in 1973, is a Japanese-American bassist and guitarist. Born and raised in Tokyo, Japan, he can speak both Japanese and English fluently. He was a VJ on MTV Japan, where he eventually met Anis. Ali is also a professional radio DJ and hosts a show on InterFM as well.

== History ==
Their debut was in July 2001. Only two days after the release of their first mini album in stereo, they performed at the Fuji Rock Festival 2001. The band's second minor debut album ammonite, which rose as high as No. 3 on the Tower Records Indie Charts in Japan, remained in the Top 50 for seven months. In 2005 they released their first major debut with the single "Visions In My Head", under the label Haunted Records (a subsidiary of Sony Music Japan), which was created by the Japanese rock musician, HYDE, lead vocalist of L'Arc-en-Ciel. They are now signed on HYDE's label VAMPROSE.

The songs "Pocketful of joy" and "Visions in my Head" were used for a TV commercial for IXY digital camera by Canon. In 2006, the band performed "Kiri", which became the opening theme to the anime series Ergo Proxy. The song was also released via the iTunes Store on May 25, 2006. Monoral also released their second major album, Turbulence, on July 4, 2007 and Via, on October 29, 2008. After the release of Via, they toured in Latin America, Europe and China.

== Collaborations ==
Monoral's support members are the guitarists Akira Yasue and Hirama Mikio (former member of Tokyo Incidents) and Daigo Kakijima on drums. Former support guitarist Eric Zay played for rock group FAKE?, another former guitarist Tomoya Tsusui has his own band called Tobyas. Monoral have collaborated with various other artists such as Fumiya Fujii, Lisa from M-flo and Mondo Grosso, either through songwriting or performances.

== Discography ==
Studio albums

- Petrol (July 13, 2005)
- Turbulence (July 4, 2007)
- Via (October 29, 2008)

EPs

- In Stereo (July 25, 2001)
- Ammonite (March 24, 2004)

Singles

- "Visions In My Head" (November 2, 2005)
- "Kiri" (May 25, 2006)
- "Tuesday" (May 9, 2007)
- "Casbah" (July 30, 2008)
- "Safira" (September 3, 2008)
- "70 Hours" (November 25, 2008)
- "Origins" (August 28, 2010)
