= Arthur K. Barnes =

American writer (1909–1969)

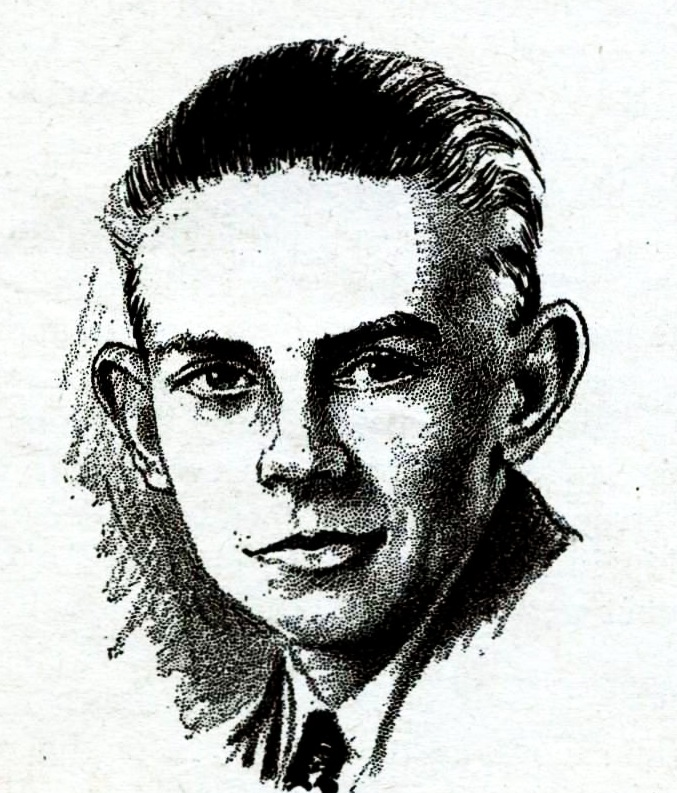
Arthur K. Barnes, as pictured in the February 1932 issue of Wonder Stories.

Arthur Kelvin Barnes (6 December 1909 – 11 March 1969) was an American science fiction author. Barnes wrote mostly for pulp magazines in the 1930s and 1940s. Barnes was most noted for his vivid and believable portrayals of alien life. As such, he is compared to Stanley G. Weinbaum. Before Barnes (and Weinbaum), SF writers usually portrayed aliens as earth-like monsters, with little originality. He was a member of the Mañana Literary Society. Several stories by Barnes were collaborations with the author Henry Kuttner, including several of the Hollywood on the Moon, Pete Manx, and Gerry Carlyle series of stories.

Barnes wrote a series of stories about "interplanetary hunters" Tommy Strike and Gerry Carlyle, collected in the books Interplanetary Hunter (1956) and Interplanetary Huntress (2007).

== Bibliography ==
- Lord of the Lightning, Wonder Stories, (December, 1931)
- Green Hell (1937)
- The Dual World
- Trouble on Titan
- Interplanetary Hunter (1956)
- Interplanetary Huntress (1956)
- The Interplanetary Huntress Returns
- The Interplanetary Huntress' Last Case
- Man about Time
- Pete Manx, Time Troubler
