= Ergo Proxy =

Japanese anime television series

- Cover of the limited edition DVD Set 1 released in 2012
- Genre: Cyberpunk; Post-apocalyptic; Psychological thriller
- Created by: Manglobe
- Anime television series
- Directed by: Shūkō Murase
- Produced by: Akio Matsuda; Satoshi Fujii; Hiroyuki Kitaura; Takashi Kōchiyama
- Written by: Dai Satō
- Music by: Yoshihiro Ike
- Studio: Manglobe
- Licensed by: Crunchyroll (Note: In North America through Crunchyroll, LLC (formerly known as Funimation).); AUS: Universal/Sony; UK: MVM Films
- Original network: Wowow
- English network: AU: ABC2; CA: G4techTV (Anime Current); US: Fuse, Funimation Channel; ZA: Animax
- Original run: February 25, 2006 – August 12, 2006
- Episodes: 23
- Manga

Centzon Hitchers and Undertaker
- Written by: Yumiko Harao
- Published by: Shogakukan
- Imprint: Sunday GX Comics
- Magazine: Monthly Sunday Gene-X
- Original run: February 18, 2006 – November 18, 2006
- Volumes: 2
- icon

Ergo Proxy is a Japanese cyberpunk anime television series, produced by Manglobe, directed by Shūkō Murase and written by Dai Satō. The series ran for 23 episodes from February to August 2006 on the Wowow satellite network. It is set in a post-apocalyptic future where humans and AutoReiv androids coexist peacefully until a virus gives the androids self-awareness, causing them to commit a series of murders. Inspector Re-L Mayer is assigned to investigate, discovering a more complicated plot behind it that involves a humanoid species known as "Proxy" who are the subject of secret government experiments.

The series, which is heavily influenced by philosophy and Gnosticism, features a combination of 2D digital cel animation, 3D computer modeling, and digital special effects. After its release in Japan, the anime was licensed for a DVD release by Geneon Entertainment, with a subsequent television broadcast on Fuse in the United States. The show was also distributed to Australian, British and Canadian anime markets. Since its release, Ergo Proxy has received mostly favorable reviews which praised its visuals and themes.

== Synopsis ==
=== Setting ===
The series is set in a post-apocalyptic, dystopian future. After an ecological disaster thousands of years prior rendered the outside world inhospitable towards life, domed cities were built as safe havens for the population. Inside these domes, one of which is the city of Romdeau (where the series takes place), humans and androids called AutoReivs coexist peacefully. Romdeau's city government adopted a bureaucracy system, in which the government is divided between several entities such as the Intelligence Bureau, the Information Bureau, the Health & Welfare Bureau, and the Security Bureau, all under the control of the Administration Bureau led by an Administrator referred to as the "Regent".

The primary AutoReiv types are referred to as either "Companion"—(AutoReivs who physically possess a human-like appearance)—or "Entourage"—(AutoReivs with a robotic appearance)—depending on their role. There are others designed for leisure or combat. AutoReivs seem to be constructed of varying degrees of bio-cybernetic complexity to fit their specific functions. The humans in the city are grown in artificial wombs but are still biologically related to their ancestors. Throughout the series, it is shown that the humans living in the domes believe they cannot reproduce naturally. Likewise, when a new person is grown, they are done so to fulfill a specific purpose, thus ensuring that person's role in society through a "raison d'être".

=== Plot ===
A series of murders committed by AutoReivs infected with the Cogito virus (which causes them to become self-aware) begins to threaten the delicate balance of Romdeau's social order. Behind the scenes, the government has been conducting secret experiments on a mysterious humanoid life form called "Proxy"; these beings (often described as god-like and immortal) are said to hold the very key to the survival of humanity.

Re-l (pronounced /riːˈɛl/ or "Ree-EL"; also represented by the spelling "R.E.A.L." in the Romdeau citizen database) Mayer, the Regent's granddaughter, is assigned to investigate the murders with her AutoReiv partner, Iggy. She encounters two unknown and highly powerful humanoids. She later learns that these humanoids are the Proxies. The other central character, an immigrant named Vincent Law, is revealed to be connected in some ways with the Proxies. After being hunted down, Vincent temporarily lives in a commune on the outside of the dome. During the massacre of the commune by Raul Creed of the Security Bureau, Vincent leaves the area for Mosk, his birthplace, in an attempt to recover his memories. Re-l later rejoins him to try to discover the truth behind the Proxies and the domes. It is revealed, among other things, that the domes are all created by Proxies and cannot function without their presence within the domes.

== Characters ==
Re-l Mayer (リル・メイヤー, Riru meiyā)
Voiced by: Rie Saitō (Japanese); Karen Thompson (English)
Inspector Re-l Mayer is a 19-year-old official with the Citizen Intelligence Bureau (市民情報局, Shimin Jōhōkyoku). As the granddaughter of Romdeau's Regent, Donov Mayer, her privileged status informs her authoritative demeanor. She heads the investigation into a series of murders committed by AutoReivs infected with the Cogito Virus. Her pursuit of the truth behind these events and the mysterious Proxies leads her to depart Romdeau alongside Vincent Law. Her distinct appearance features dark clothing, black hair, and pronounced blue eye-shadow.
Vincent Law (ビンセント・ロウ, Binsento rou)
Voiced by: Kōji Yusa (Japanese); Liam O'Brien (English)
Vincent Law is an immigrant from Mosk working for Romdeau's AutoReiv Control Division (オートレイブ処理課). He is assigned to the Temporary Immigrant Sector FG (暫定移民区域FG), a unit tasked with disposing of infected AutoReivs. Initially appearing unassuming, his demeanor and physical presence become more serious and confident over time. Vincent initially strives to become a Model Citizen, but the resurfacing of a traumatic past compels him to flee the city. He develops a close relationship with Inspector Re-l Mayer during their subsequent journey.
Pino (ピノ)
Voiced by: Akiko Yajima (Japanese); Rachel Hirschfeld (English)
Pino is a Companion Type AutoReiv infected with the Cogito Virus, possessing the mind and body of a child. Originally owned by Raul and Samantha Creed, she served as a surrogate child for the couple. After a tragedy befalls the Creed family, Pino becomes infected and flees, forming a strong attachment to Vincent Law and joining his journey. She has long purple hair, green eyes, and is often seen in a pink rabbit costume or a dark green jumpsuit. Pino frequently plays a melodica and in the Japanese dub, refers to herself in the third person.
Iggy (イギー, Igī)
Voiced by: Kiyomitsu Mizuuchi (Japanese); Travis Willingham (English)
Iggy is an Entourage AutoReiv who has served Re-l Mayer since her childhood. After contracting a weaponized strain of the Cogito Virus, his devotion becomes a destructive obsession. He blames Vincent Law for taking Re-l away and develops a complex state of both love and hatred for his master. Iggy attempts to imprison Re-l to protect her and kill Vincent. He ultimately sacrifices himself to save her from an explosion, leaving only his damaged head. Re-l, unwilling to let him suffer, ends his existence.
Raul Creed (ラウル・クリード, Rauru Kurīdo)
Voiced by: Hikaru Hanada (Japanese); Patrick Seitz (English)
Raul Creed is the Director-General of the Citizen Security Bureau (市民警備局, Shimin Keibikyoku), reporting directly to the Regent. He and his wife once cared for the AutoReiv Pino as a surrogate child. Initially a loyal official, Creed grows to despise Romdeau's ruling order, and his sanity deteriorates, marked by hallucinations of Vincent Law. After being wounded by a clone of Re-l Mayer, he returns to his ruined home and discovers Pino's drawings, prompting him to search for her. During this search, an infected AutoReiv knocks him onto a large shard of glass, fatally impaling him.
Kristeva (クリステヴァ, Kurisuteva)
Voiced by: Hōko Kuwashima (Japanese); Kirsten Potter (English)
Kristeva is Raul Creed's Entourage AutoReiv, performing her duties with unwavering loyalty. Following Creed's orders, she later assumes the role of Pino's guardian. By the series' conclusion, it is implied she has contracted the Cogito Virus, but her new purpose in caring for Pino allows her to maintain her sanity.
Daedalus Yumeno (デダルス・ユメノ, Dedarusu Yumeno)
Voiced by: Sanae Kobayashi (Japanese); Yuri Lowenthal (English)
Daedalus is the chief physician leading the Proxy Research Team and Director of the Division of Health and Welfare (厚生局, Kōseikyoku). He serves as Re-l Mayer's personal physician and childhood friend, displaying a deep obsession with her. Using Amrita Cells from Monad Proxy, he creates a winged clone of Re-l. After this clone is taken over by Monad Proxy and abandons him, a mentally unstable Daedalus is fatally crushed by falling rubble. He is named after the figure from Greek mythology.
Donov Mayer (ドノブ・メイヤー, Donobu Meiyā)
Berkeley: Voiced by: Yū Shimaka (Japanese); Doug Stone (English)
Derrida: Voiced by: Yōko Sōmi (Japanese); Melodee Spevack (English)
Husserl: Voiced by: Hidekatsu Shibata (Japanese); Michael McConnohie (English)
Lacan: Voiced by: Atsuko Tanaka (Japanese); Barbara Goodson (English)
Donov Mayer is the elderly Regent of Romdeau, also known as its representative. He communicates through a council of four Entourage AutoReivs—Derrida, Lacan, Husserl, and Berkeley—which take the form of stone statues. He is the grandfather of Re-l Mayer. Proxy One murders Donov, and his Entourage council is destroyed when his chamber collapses.

== Production ==
It is set in the future. A group of robots become infected with something called the Kojiro [sic] virus, and become aware of their own existence. So these robots, which had been tools of humans, decide to go on an adventure to search for themselves. They have to decide whether the virus that infected them created their identity, or whether they gained their identity through their travels. This question is meant to represent our own debate over whether we become who we are because of our environment, or because of things that are inherent in us. The robots are all named after philosophers: Derrida and Lacan and Husserl.

— Dai Satō

Ergo Proxy was directed by Shūkō Murase with Dai Satō serving as chief writer and Naoyuki Onda as character designer. The anime was originally announced at the MIP TV Trade Show in France as a 23-episode TV series. Manglobe initially approached Shūkō Murase with a bare-bones vision for a futuristic detective thriller, which included the title, a plot outline for episodes 1–3 and a design concept for Romdeau. Beyond that they let him develop the idea towards a more existentialist slant.

"There was almost too much freedom", he laughs. "A show slated to be on a commercial network carries restrictions according to the time slot", he explains. "Sponsors often have requests intended to help propel the work to hit status; and merchandising entails another set of requirements altogether. By comparison, all Ergo Proxy had to deal with was a DVD release and a TV broadcast over a pay satellite channel."

When asked about how he devised the title Ergo Proxy, Satō simply replied "[I]t sounds cool". Murase explained he originally wanted to use the concept of everyone having another self inside of themselves: the idea that there are two personalities inside a person and noted that René Descartes' phrase "cogito, ergo sum" was the inspiration for it. Satō stated that they originally did not want to explicitly express the concepts of Gnosticism in the anime. However, their personal beliefs ended up reflecting the ideas of Gnosticism and they realized how well these terms fit and decided to use them.

At first they intended to have Vincent as the leading protagonist and Re-l as a supporting character; however, as they fleshed out her character, she became a much stronger character and began to steal the spotlight from Vincent. This gave them the opportunity to split the narrative between the two characters instead of having a single protagonist lead the story.

== Media ==
=== Anime ===
In Japan, Ergo Proxy aired on pay-TV satellite broadcasting network WOWOW from 25 February 2006, concluding on August 12, 2006. Ergo Proxy was then released by Geneon Entertainment onto nine DVD volumes from May 25, 2006, to January 25, 2007. The series was licensed by Geneon Entertainment for Region 1 release, which began on November 21, 2006, and spanned six volumes. The English dub of Ergo Proxy premiered on pay-TV channel Fuse from June 9 to November 24, 2007, in the United States. and a complete DVD collection was later released in December 2008.

On July 3, 2008, Geneon Entertainment and Funimation Entertainment announced an agreement to distribute select titles in North America. While Geneon Entertainment still retains the license, Funimation Entertainment assumed exclusive rights to the manufacturing, marketing, sales, and distribution of select titles which included Ergo Proxy. As of March 29, 2012, the series has been fully licensed by Funimation and re-released the series under their Anime Classics label on July 3, 2012. Geneon also released a four-disc complete Blu-ray box collection on September 25, 2012, and two DVD box collection on September 25, 2012, and August 22, 2012, respectively.

In Australia and New Zealand, the Ergo Proxy DVDs were distributed by Madman Entertainment, the first volume released in March 2007. The first volume of Ergo Proxy was released in the United Kingdom by MVM Films on August 6, 2007. The English dub of Ergo Proxy aired on ABC2 (the national digital public television channel) from July 3 to December 4, 2007. In Canada, the English dub aired on pay-TV digital channel G4techTV's Anime Current programming block from July 26 to December 27, 2007.

=== Manga ===
A manga spin-off, titled Centzon Hitchers and Undertaker (センツォン・ヒッチャーズ&アンダーテイカー, Sentson Hitchāzu & Andāteikā), by Yumiko Harao, was serialized in Shogakukan's Monthly Sunday Gene-X from February 18 to November 18, 2006. (Note: The manga was serialized from the March 2006 to the December 2006 issues (cover dates), released on February 18 and November 18, respectively, of the same year.) Its chapters were collected in two tankōbon volumes, released on August 18, 2006, and February 19, 2007.

=== Soundtracks ===
Ergo Proxy OST opus01 and opus02

Soundtrack album by Yoshihiro Ike
- Released: May 25, 2006 (opus01); August 25, 2006 (opus02)
- Genre: Anime Soundtrack
- Length: 57:00 (opus01); 53:46 (opus02)

Two soundtracks of the anime series, titled Ergo Proxy OST opus01 and Ergo Proxy OST opus02, have been released by Geneon Entertainment in Japan on May 25, 2006 and August 25, 2006, respectively. Both soundtracks feature compositions of Yoshihiro Ike. The first soundtrack, opus01, contains several tracks including the opening and ending themes: "Kiri" (by Monoral) and "Paranoid Android" (by Radiohead). The second soundtrack, opus02, was initially packaged with a special edition of the first Region 1 DVD.

Ergo Proxy OST opus01
No.	Title	Length
1.	"awakening"	1:46
2.	"kiri"	1:46
3.	"new pulse"	3:14
4.	"No. 0724FGARK"	3:15
5.	"prayer"	2:53
6.	"raging pulse"	3:26
7.	"autoreiv contagion"	2:33
8.	"Romdo overshadows"	2:26
9.	"RE-L124c41+"	2:55
10.	"deal in blood"	3:13
11.	"wasteland nostalgia"	4:02
12.	"vital signs"	3:11
13.	"written on clouds"	3:22
14.	"WombSys"	3:22
15.	"last exit to paradise"	3:38
16.	"he the empty"	2:56
17.	"Centzontotochtin"	2:59
18.	"Fellow Citizens"	2:46
19.	"Paranoid Android" (performed by Radiohead)	6:23

Ergo Proxy OST opus02
No.	Title	Length
1.	"futu-risk"	2:45
2.	"mazecity"	3:02
3.	"bilbul"	3:20
4.	"confession"	1:55
5.	"wrong way home"	2:49
6.	"busy doing nothing"	3:22
7.	"cytotropism"	3:13
8.	"angel's share"	3:15
9.	"hideout"	3:01
10.	"ophelia"	1:53
11.	"domecoming"	3:33
12.	"terra incognita"	3:22
13.	"deus ex machina"	3:30
14.	"eternal smile"	1:57
15.	"life after god"	3:14
16.	"Goodbye Vincent"	2:49
17.	"shampoo planet"	2:28
18.	"kiri" (performed by Monoral)	4:18

== Reception ==
Ergo Proxy received mostly positive reviews, with critics praising the series for its intricate visuals, cyberpunk aesthetic and intellectual themes; while criticizing the uneven narrative and its over reliance on philosophical references. Newtype USA stated that they were "excited by the premise of the show, which features complex drama surrounding the strikingly beautiful crime investigator Re-l Mayer, and an intricate sci-fi setting, incorporating robots, living in human society and a grotesque array of unique monsters". Newtype went on to praise the "tremendous supporting cast and carefully woven plot". Newtype USA featured the first Ergo Proxy DVD in their "DVD of the Month", describing it as a "show that rewards viewers with a deep, believable, and above all thoughtful sci-fi story instead of simply bashing robots together". Katherine Luther of About.com praised it for its cyberpunk themes and mix of 2D and 3D animation as well as its deep psychological storyline, calling it creepy, intense and "edge-of-your-seat-delightful".

THEM Anime Reviews praised the visuals and pacing of the plot while noting that the greatest flaw in the series is that the designs can be inconsistent at times. Zac Bertschy of Anime News Network gave it an overall score of B+ and criticized the characters, stating "It's an unfortunate stain on an otherwise excellent series." However, he praised the animation stating "The backgrounds in particular are breathtakingly detailed and beautiful, which is a surprise given the bleak, dystopian surroundings" Carlo Santos, also from Anime News Network, criticized the middle and ending of the anime, stating "Some of the middle episodes fall back on experimental gimmicks and fail to advance the story, while the finale becomes a towering mess as it desperately tries to resolve every single plot point. Even the animation has embarrassing moments of inconsistency." However, Santos continued to state "for trying so hard to scale the heights of a difficult genre, Ergo Proxy still deserves credit. It accomplishes more than most other anime series ever hope to, flaws and all."

IGN contributor D. F. Smith reviewed the series DVD box set in 2008, giving the series a 7.0 out of a possible score of 10. Smith overall found the visuals, music and voice acting of Ergo Proxy to be exceptional, but stated that the overall story was too complex and relied too heavily on philosophical references rather than a strong narrative. In conclusion, D. F. Smith wrote "Ergo Proxy isn't without its share of disappointments, but even so, it has a heck of a lot going for it. What it lacks in the way of a truly gripping, involving story, it makes up for in part with a powerful soundtrack, some powerful visuals, and the occasional powerful insight. If those are the sort of things you go to Japanese animation looking for, you might not find this series disappointing at all". Another IGN columnist, Ramsley Isler, placed Ergo Proxy's opening as the 10th greatest anime opening. Isler praised the opening's use of dark visuals juxtaposed with the opening theme song's optimistic tone, comparing it to a Nine Inch Nails music video.

On June 12, 2015, the Chinese Ministry of Culture announced that they had listed Ergo Proxy among 38 anime and manga titles banned in China.

The Encyclopedia of Science Fiction described Ergo Proxy as an effective science fiction anime, praising its ambitious storytelling, stylish animation and complex exploration of philosophical themes. It highlighted the series' engagement with Gnosticism, metaphysics and questions of identity and creation, alongside numerous allusions to classical mythology, literature and science fiction, including the stories of Daedalus and Icarus, Pinocchio and Hugo Gernsback's Ralph 124C 41+. The encyclopedia praised the show's distinctive noir atmosphere, while noting its sometimes excessive reliance on dark imagery and its tendency toward narrative ambiguity. It also appreciated the occasional humor and lighter episodes that contrast with the generally sombre tone, highlighting the charming character of Pino.
