= Terry Fox (disambiguation) =

Terry Fox (1958–1981) was a Canadian whose Marathon of Hope raised funds and awareness for cancer research.

Terry Fox may also refer to:

== Other people ==
- Terry Fox (American football) (1918–1981), American football player
- Terry Fox (baseball) (born 1935), American former MLB pitcher
- Terry Fox (artist) (1943–2008), American video, conceptual, and performance artist

== Places named after the Canadian ==
- Mount Terry Fox, a peak in the Canadian Rockies
- Mount Terry Fox Provincial Park, the surrounding provincial park
- Terry Fox Field (SFU Stadium at Terry Fox Field) in Burnaby, British Columbia
- Terry Fox Drive, Ottawa
- Terry Fox Memorial and Lookout, a memorial and lookout in Thunder Bay, Ontario
- Terry Fox Secondary School, Port Coquitlam, British Columbia
- Terry Fox Stadium, Ottawa, Ontario
- Terry Fox Stadium (Brampton), Brampton, Ontario
- Terry Fox Station, a transitway stop in Ottawa
- Terry Fox Theatre, Port Coquitlam, British Columbia

== Things named after the Canadian ==
- CCGS Terry Fox, a Canadian Coast Guard icebreaker
- Terry Fox Hall of Fame
- Terry Fox Foundation
- Terry Fox Research Institute, Cancer research institute in Vancouver, British Columbia
- Terry Fox Run, an annual charity event
