= List of monuments and memorials to Terry Fox =

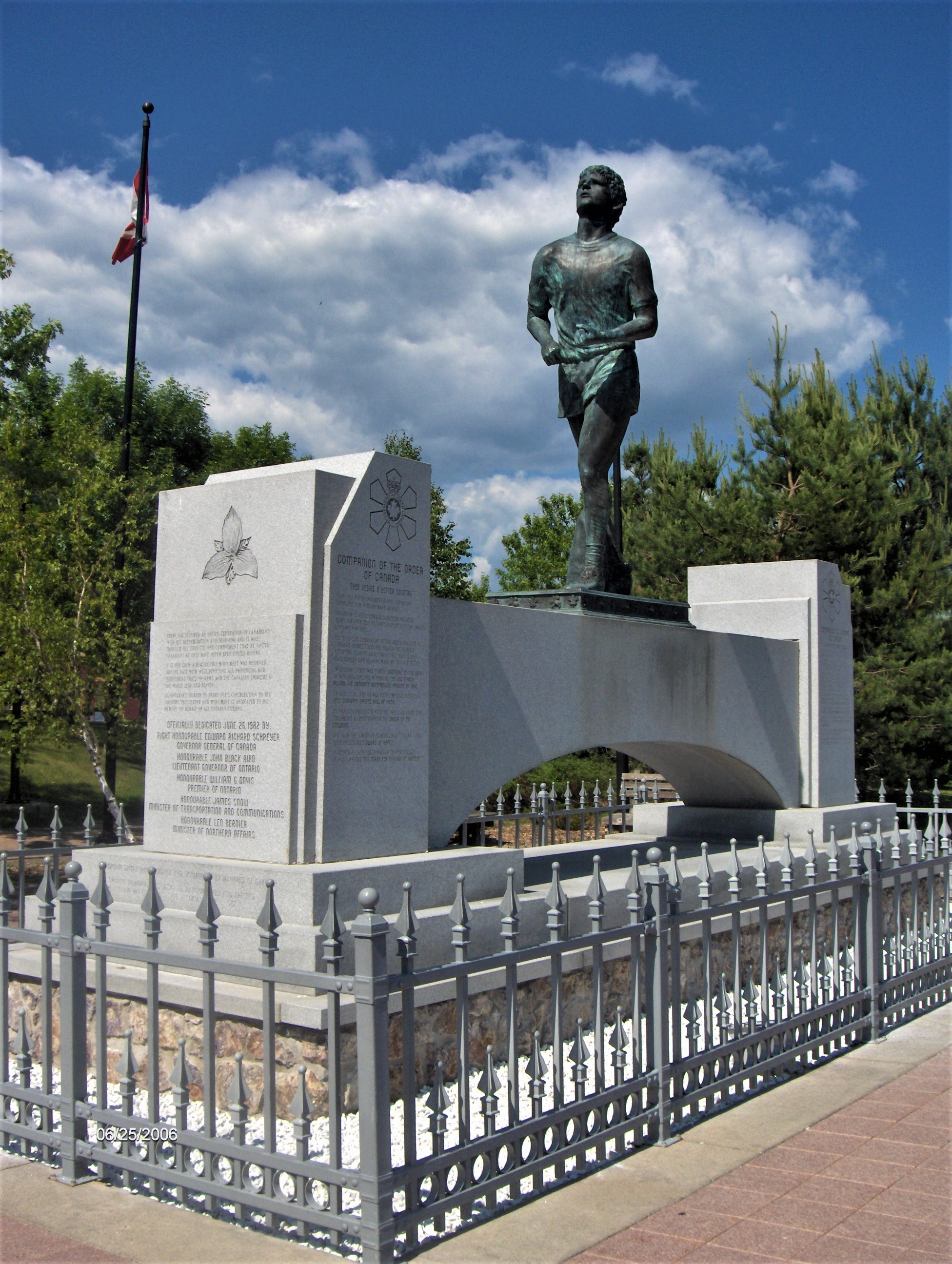
The Terry Fox Monument in Thunder Bay

This is a list of monuments and memorials to Terry Fox.

== General ==
| Monument or memorial | Type | Location | Date | Notes |
|---|---|---|---|---|
| Canada 150 Terry Fox stamp | Postage stamp | | 2017 | One of 10 stamps issued to commemorate the 150th anniversary of Canada. |
| CCGS Terry Fox | Icebreaker | St. John's, Newfoundland and Labrador | 1983 | First leased, then sold to the Canadian Coast Guard |
| Terry Fox Award | Award | | | For the 2010 Winter Olympics |
| Terry Fox Day | Holiday | Manitoba | | Renamed from Civic Holiday in 2015. |
| Terry Fox Foundation | | | 1988 | Split from the Canadian Cancer Society |
| Terry Fox Hall of Fame | Hall of Fame | Toronto, Ontario | 1993 | Renamed to Canadian Disability Hall of Fame in 2009 |
| Terry Fox Humanitarian Award | Scholarship | | 1982 | Program is based in Burnaby, British Columbia |
| Terry Fox, Marathon of Hope | Postage stamp | | 1982 | Issued to commemorate the Marathon of Hope to circumvent Canada Post's usual waiting period of issuing stamps 10 years after an individual's death |
| Terry Fox Memorial and Lookout | Lookout, monument with statue | Thunder Bay, Ontario | 26 June 1982 | Manfred Pirwitz, sculptor |
| Terry Fox Atlantic "Mile 0" site where Marathon of Hope starts | Bronze statue by Luben Boykov, installed on April 12, 2012 | Marathon of Hope began in St. John's, Newfoundland and Labrador | Bronze statue by Luben Boykov; installed as part of a "Mile 0" memorial in St. John's NL on April 12, 2012. | Statue erected next to St. John's Harbor location where Fox dipped his toe into the Atlantic Ocean to start his Marathon of Hope. Quote from Terry Fox in bronze letters on the back wall of memorial - "I just realize people would realize that anything’s possible if you try, dreams are made if people try.”. |
| Terry Fox Pacific "Mile 0" Transcanada Highway site where Marathon of Hope was to end | Bronzed statue by Nathan Scott; erected August 10, 2005 | Marathon of Hope was to end in Victoria, British Columbia | Life-sized (5’9”) bronzed statue on a granite base of Terry Fox depicting him during his Marathon of Hope run across Canada, erected in Victoria on August 10, 2005. | Statue erected on the southwest corner of Beacon Hill Park at 20 Douglas Street (and Dallas Road) in Victoria, BC where Terry Fox was to dip his toe into the Pacific to signify the end of the Marathon of Hope |
| Terry Fox Memorial Sculpture | Sculpture by John Hooper | Ottawa, Ontario | October, 1983 | The sculpture was first placed near the Supreme Court of Canada, then in 1998 moved across the street from Parliament Hill, and in 2024 moved to its current location on Sparks Street in downtown Ottawa. |
| Terry Fox Run | Charity run | Global | 13 September 1981 | Fundraising event for cancer research |
| Terry Fox Plaza | Square with statues | Vancouver, British Columbia | | Square at BC Place Stadium. |

== Buildings and structures ==
| Monument or memorial | Type | Location | Date | Notes |
|---|---|---|---|---|
| Terry Fox Elementary School | School | Abbotsford, British Columbia | | Operated by School District 34 Abbotsford |
| Terry Fox Elementary School | School | Barrie, Ontario | | Operated by Simcoe County District School Board |
| Terry Fox Elementary School | School | Bathurst, New Brunswick | | Operated by Anglophone North School District |
| Terry Fox Elementary School | School | Laval, Quebec | | Operated by Sir Wilfrid Laurier School Board |
| Terry Fox Elementary School | School | Pierrefonds, Quebec | | |
| Terry Fox Field | Sports venue | Burnaby, British Columbia | | Used by Simon Fraser University |
| Terry Fox Laboratory | Research laboratory | Vancouver, British Columbia | 1981 | Housed at the British Columbia Cancer Research Centre |
| Terry Fox Montessori | Montessori school | Mississauga, Ontario | | |
| Terry Fox Public School | School | Ajax, Ontario | | Operated by the Durham District School Board |
| Terry Fox Public School | School | Aurora, Ontario | | Operated by the York Region District School Board |
| Terry Fox Public School | School | Brampton, Ontario | | Operated by Peel District School Board |
| Terry Fox Public School | School | Cobourg, Ontario | | Operated by Kawartha Pine Ridge District School Board |
| Terry Fox Public School | School | Scarborough, Ontario | | Operated by Toronto District School Board; opened in 1981 by the Scarborough Board of Education |
| Terry Fox School | School | Calgary, Alberta | | Operated by the Calgary Board of Education |
| Terry Fox Secondary School | School | Port Coquitlam, British Columbia | 1986 | The school was built in the 1950s and renamed in 1986 |
| Terry Fox Shopping Centre | Strip mall | Kanata, Ontario | | At the corner of Terry Fox Drive and Hazeldean Road |
| Terry Fox Sports Complex | Sports venue | Cornwall, Prince Edward Island | | |
| Terry Fox Sports Complex | Sports venue | Greater Sudbury, Ontario | | On the campus of Collège Boréal |
| Terry Fox Stadium | Sports venue | Ottawa, Ontario | | |
| Terry Fox Stadium (Brampton) | Track and field facility and athletic field | Brampton, Ontario | | Venue at Chinguacousy Park. |
| Terry Fox Theatre | Theatre | Port Coquitlam, British Columbia | 1999 | It is attached to but independent of Terry Fox Secondary School |

== Media ==
| Monument or memorial | Type | Date | Notes |
|---|---|---|---|
| Into the Wind | Film | 2010 | |
| Run Terry Run | Film | 2026 | |
| Terry | Book | 2005 | By Douglas Coupland |
| Terry | Film | 2005 | |
| Terry Fox: A pictorial tribute to the Marathon of Hope | Book | 1980 | By Jeremy Brown and Gail Harvey |
| Terry Fox: His Story | Book | 1981 | By Leslie Scrivener |
| The Terry Fox Story | Film | 1983 | |

== Natural areas ==
| Monument or memorial | Type | Location | Date | Notes |
|---|---|---|---|---|
| Mount Terry Fox | Mountain | Mount Terry Fox Provincial Park, Selwyn Range, British Columbia | 1981 | |
| Mount Terry Fox Provincial Park | Provincial park | British Columbia | 1982 | |
| Parc Terry Fox | Municipal park | Dollard-des-Ormeaux, Quebec | | |
| Parc Terry Fox | Municipal park | Granby, Quebec | | |
| Parc Terry Fox | Municipal park | Kirkland, Quebec | | |
| Parc Terry Fox | Municipal park | Mascouche, Quebec | | |
| Parc Terry Fox | Municipal park | Rouyn-Noranda, Quebec | | |
| Parc Terry Fox | Municipal park | Sainte-Catherine, Quebec | | |
| Terry Fox Creek | Waterway | British Columbia | | Tributary of the Fraser River; portions are in Mount Terry Fox Provincial Park |
| Terry Fox Memorial Park | Municipal park | Cochrane, Alberta | | |
| Terry Fox Park | Municipal park | Fergus, Ontario | | |
| Terry Fox Park | Municipal park | Port Coquitlam, British Columbia | | Adjacent to Terry Fox Secondary School |
| Terry Fox Park | Municipal park | Sarnia, Ontario | | |
| Terry Fox Park | Municipal park | The Pas, Manitoba | | |
| Terry Fox Trail | Route in municipal parks | St. Catharines, Ontario | | |

== Roads and transport ==
| Monument or memorial | Type | Location | Date | Notes |
|---|---|---|---|---|
| Avenue Terry-Fox | Road | Rouyn-Noranda, Quebec | | Connects to Quebec Autoroute 117 |
| Boulevard Terry-Fox | Road | Saint-Eustache, Quebec | | Connects to Quebec Autoroute 640 |
| Impasse Terry Fox | Road | Saint-Hyacinthe, Quebec | | |
| Rue Terry Fox | Road | Clarenceville, Quebec | | |
| Terry Fox Avenue | Road | Abbotsford, British Columbia | | |
| Terry Fox Courage Highway | Road (segment) | Ontario Highway 11 | 30 July 1981 | The segment of Ontario Highways 11 and 17 from Thunder Bay in the west to Nipigon in the east. |
| Terry Fox Drive | Road | Brighton, Ontario | | |
| Terry Fox Drive | Road | Champlain, Ontario | | |
| Terry Fox Drive | Road | Charlottetown, Prince Edward Island | | |
| Terry Fox Drive | Road | Kanata (Ottawa) | | |
| Terry Fox Drive | Road | Kingston, Ontario | | |
| Terry Fox Lane | Road | Burnaby, British Columbia | | |
| Terry Fox Place | Road | Sault Ste. Marie, Ontario | | |
| Terry Fox station | Bus rapid transit station | Ottawa, Ontario | September 2004 | Station of the Transitway |
| Terry Fox Street | Road | Markham, Ontario | | |
| Terry Fox Way | Road (segment) | Mississauga, Ontario | | North of Britannia Road, it continues as Silken Laumann Way. |
| Terry-Fox Avenue | Road | Laval, Quebec | | |
| Terry-Fox Avenue | Road | Carleton Place, Ontario | | |
