= Ruth Frankel =

Ruth Hartman Frankel

Ruth Hartman Frankel, CC (c. 1903 – 3 November 1989) was honoured as a Companion of the Order of Canada in 1969 due to her work for the Canadian Cancer Society.

Frankel was born Ruth Lorley Hartman, in Chicago, Illinois where she was a student at the Kenwood Loring School for Girls and University High School. She studied liberal arts at the University of Illinois and law at the University of Chicago. She emigrated to Canada in 1925 when she married Egmont Leo Frankel (d. 1964). She died in Toronto, predeceased by one of her three children.

Frankel was active with the Canadian Cancer Society in the late 1940s. In 1950, she founded the Toronto chapter of the Canadian Cancer Society. Subsequently, she worked towards the creation of a lodge at the Princess Margaret Hospital, a facility specialising in cancer treatment. She is also the author of the book Three Cheers for Volunteers (1965, Clarke Irwin).

In early 1954, Ontario provincial law was changed to permit Frankel to become the first woman to join the Board of Governors for the Ontario Cancer Treatment and Research Foundation.

The Ruth Hartman Frankel Humanitarian Award was established by the society to honour those who have supported research into cancer. Isadore Sharp was the first recipient on 25 September 1983 for his support for Terry Fox and subsequent Terry Fox Run campaigns. However, as of May 2006, Internet searches that included the Canadian Cancer Society website have not yet found any cases where this award was presented after 1983.

In 1985, Frankel was given an honorary fellowship by Ryerson Polytechnical Institute (now Toronto Metropolitan University).
