= Mount Fox =

Mount Fox may refer to:

- Mount Fox (Antarctica)
- Mount Fox (Selkirk Mountains) in British Columbia, Canada
- Mount Fox (Canadian Rockies), a mountain on the Alberta/British Columbia border, Canada
- Mount Fox (Montana) in Park County, Montana, USA
- Mount Fox (New Zealand) in South Island, New Zealand
- Mount Fox (Queensland) in Queensland, Australia

== See also ==
- Mount Terry Fox, in the Selwyn Range of the Canadian Rockies in British Columbia, Canada
