= Betty Fox =

Canadian cancer research activist

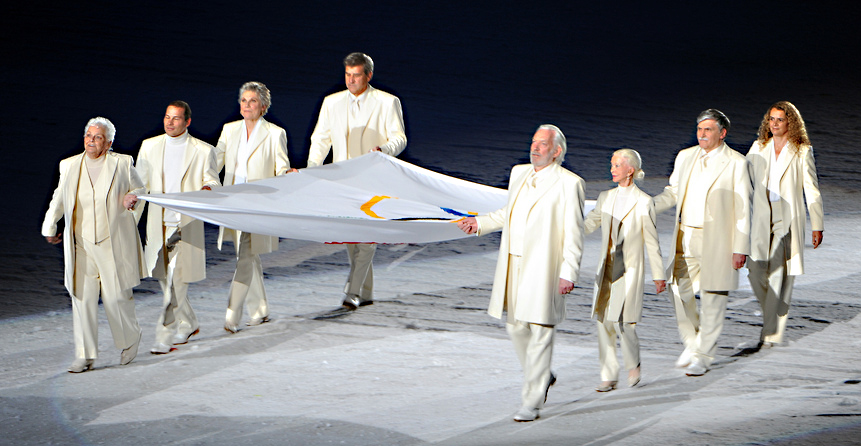
- Betty Fox (far left, front) carries the Olympic flag into the 2010 Winter Olympics opening ceremony in Vancouver.
- Born: Betty Lou Wark; November 15, 1937; Boissevain, Manitoba, Canada
- Died: June 17, 2011 (aged 73); Chilliwack, British Columbia, Canada
- Occupation: Activist
- Spouse: Rolland Fox (m. 1956)
- Children: 4; including Terry

Betty Lou Fox (née Wark; November 15, 1937 – June 17, 2011) was a Canadian cancer research activist, the mother of Terry Fox and founder of the Terry Fox Foundation. She was the most prominent figure in Terry Fox's legacy.

== Biography ==
Fox was born in Boissevain, Manitoba, on November 15, 1937. Her mother, Mary Ann Gladue, was Métis.

Betty Fox was raised in Melita, Manitoba, and in her teens moved to Winnipeg, where she met her husband Rolland "Rolly" Fox, who was working for the Canadian National Railway. They married in 1956.

The Foxes had four children: sons Fred (born 1957), Terry (1958), and Darrell (1961), and daughter Judith (1965). In 1966 the family moved to British Columbia, making Port Coquitlam their home. In March 1977, Terry was diagnosed with osteogenic sarcoma, and his right leg was amputated above the knee.

== Marathon of Hope ==
Terry Fox expressed to his mother his wish to raise awareness and funds for cancer research. His mother discouraged him, angering Fox, though she later came to support the project. She recalled, "He said, 'I thought you'd be one of the first persons to believe in me.' And I wasn't. I was the first person who let him down." He began the Marathon of Hope on April 12, 1980, which was a run across Canada from St. John's, Newfoundland, to Victoria, British Columbia, to raise money for cancer research. He reached 5,373 kilometres (3,339 mi) over 143 days before finding the cancer had spread to his lungs. This forced him to end his run on September 1, 1980, 2/3 of the way across Canada, just before reaching Thunder Bay, ON. Immediately, support to continue his cause came from across the country and overseas. He died on June 28, 1981.

== Terry Fox Run and Foundation ==
After Terry's death, Betty Fox took on the development of the Terry Fox Run with the Canadian Cancer Society. In 1988, The Terry Fox Foundation became its own charitable organization. Fox took the lead on many parts of the run and the foundation, ensuring Terry's wishes and goals were reflected in the run's organization. "It is estimated that Betty spoke to more than 400,000 school children alone during her 25 years of touring the country, leaving each and every child with the inspirational story of the Marathon of Hope. The final words of every speech, 'Never, ever give up on your dreams,' have become her hallmark."

Fox was selected to be one of the Olympic flag-bearers in the opening ceremonies of the Vancouver 2010 Winter Olympics. One month later on March 12, 2010, Fox and her husband Rolly carried the Paralympic Torch into the opening ceremonies of the 2010 Paralympic Games, after a whole segment of those ceremonies were dedicated to their son Terry.

== Death ==
Fox died June 17, 2011, due to complications from diabetes and arthritis. She was survived by her husband, three children, and nine grandchildren. Her memorial was held in Port Coquitlam, at the same church where Terry's memorial was held 30 years previously, almost to the day. It was attended by dignitaries including former Vancouver 2010 Olympic Committee CEO John Furlong and British Columbia Premier Christy Clark, among others. So many turned out for the funeral that the city opened the civic recreation centre to the public, where the memorial was broadcast live. Her death made headlines across North America.

Her husband Rolland died of lung cancer on March 8, 2016.
