= Dawson Hodge =

Canadian gridiron football player (born 2001)

Profile
- Position: Kicker

Personal information
- Born: November 28, 2001 (age 24)
- Listed height: 5 ft 11 in (1.80 m)
- Listed weight: 184 lb (83 kg)

Career information
- High school: Terry Fox (Port Coquitlam, British Columbia)
- University: Wilfrid Laurier (2020–2025)
- CFL draft: 2025: undrafted

Career history
- Toronto Argonauts (2025)*; Saskatchewan Roughriders (2025)*; Calgary Stampeders (2026)*; Saskatchewan Roughriders (2026)
- * Offseason or practice squad member only

Awards and highlights
- Second-team All-Canadian (2022); First-team OUA All-Star (2022)
- Stats at CFL.ca

Dawson Hodge (born November 28, 2001) is a Canadian professional football placekicker. He last played for the Saskatchewan Roughriders of the Canadian Football League (CFL). He played U Sports football for the Wilfrid Laurier Golden Hawks.

== Early life ==
Hodge was born on November 28, 2001. He attended Terry Fox Secondary School in Port Coquitlam, British Columbia, Canada. Hodge learned how to kick from his neighbor, Canadian Football Hall of Famer, Lui Passaglia.

== University career ==
Hodge played U Sports football for the Wilfrid Laurier Golden Hawks from 2020 to 2025. He was the team's kicker and punter for 51 games, averaging 41.4 yards per punt and a long of 94 yards. As the placekicker, Hodge made 76 of 103 field goals with a long of 49 yards and 419 points. In 2022, Hodge was a first-team OUA All-Star and second-team All-Canadian.

== Professional career ==
=== Toronto Argonauts ===
After going undrafted in the 2025 CFL draft, Early signed with the Toronto Argonauts of the Canadian Football League (CFL) as an undrafted free agent. On May 14, 2025, he was released by the team.

=== Saskatchewan Roughriders (first stint) ===
On May 26, 2025, Hodge was signed by the Saskatchewan Roughriders. On June 1, he was released and returned to Wilfrid Laurier University for his final year of eligibility.

=== Calgary Stampeders ===
On December 19, 2025, Hodge signed with the Calgary Stampeders. On May 31, 2026, he was released by the team.

=== Saskatchewan Roughriders (second stint) ===
On August 6, 2026, Hodge was signed to the practice roster of the Roughriders. He was elevated to the active roster on September 11, and made his debut the following day against the Winnipeg Blue Bombers. On October 4, 2026, he was released by the Roughriders.
