= Jewish Museum of Canada =

The Jewish Museum of Canada was a proposed museum to be built in Toronto, Ontario, Canada by a partnership of the family of Rosalie and Isadore Sharp, founder of the Four Seasons Hotels and Resorts, and the United Jewish Appeal Federation of Greater Toronto. The Sharp family has pledged $20 million towards the project, towards a total fundraising goal of $150 million. The museum is to feature three themed galleries with artifact and multimedia-based interactives and three immersive environments entitled: Jewish Experience, Jewish Life in Canada and The Neuberger Holocaust Education Centre.

The proposal, which was announced in September 2014, has been indefinitely shelved due to the United Jewish Appeal prioritizing other fundraising projects while the University of Toronto, which had been a partner in the project, wished to proceed immediately with developing the cultural centre that the museum was to be a part. Isadore Sharp, who initiated the project, said in January 2016 that: "This was a wonderful opportunity that the university was offering to us. They have a project that they are moving forward with, and they certainly wanted [the museum] to be part of it, but we had a timeline to work on it, and it just wasn’t feasible with the commitments that had already been made by federation." Sharp added that: "At this stage, it’s all being put on hold and it is up to the federation sometime in the future if they wish to proceed with it".

Steve Shulman, campaign director of the UJA federation, told the Canadian Jewish News that: "the university wanted to move ahead in a very short period of time, which was particularly challenging, and I think from UJA’s standpoint, we are in a situation where we also have particular priorities in terms of the vulnerable in our community, Jewish education, identity, Jewish advocacy connection with Israel, etc., in our capital campaign."

== Original 90 Queen's Park Crescent proposal ==
The museum was originally to be built on the site of the former McLaughlin Planetarium as part of a cultural complex planned by the University of Toronto at 90 Queen's Park Crescent, which owns the site. The complex is to include a 250-seat performance hall for the University of Toronto's Faculty of Music, space for the university's department of history, the department of Near and Middle Eastern civilizations, the Institute of Islamic Studies, and a research arm for the Centre for Jewish Studies.

In January 2016, however, the university announced that it was proceeding with the construction of what is now to be called the Centre for Civilizations and Cultures, without the participation of the Jewish Museum of Canada, because the UJA "needed to focus on more pressing funding priorities."
