= Riley Senft =

Canadian humanitarian, prostate cancer activist, and ultramarathon athlete

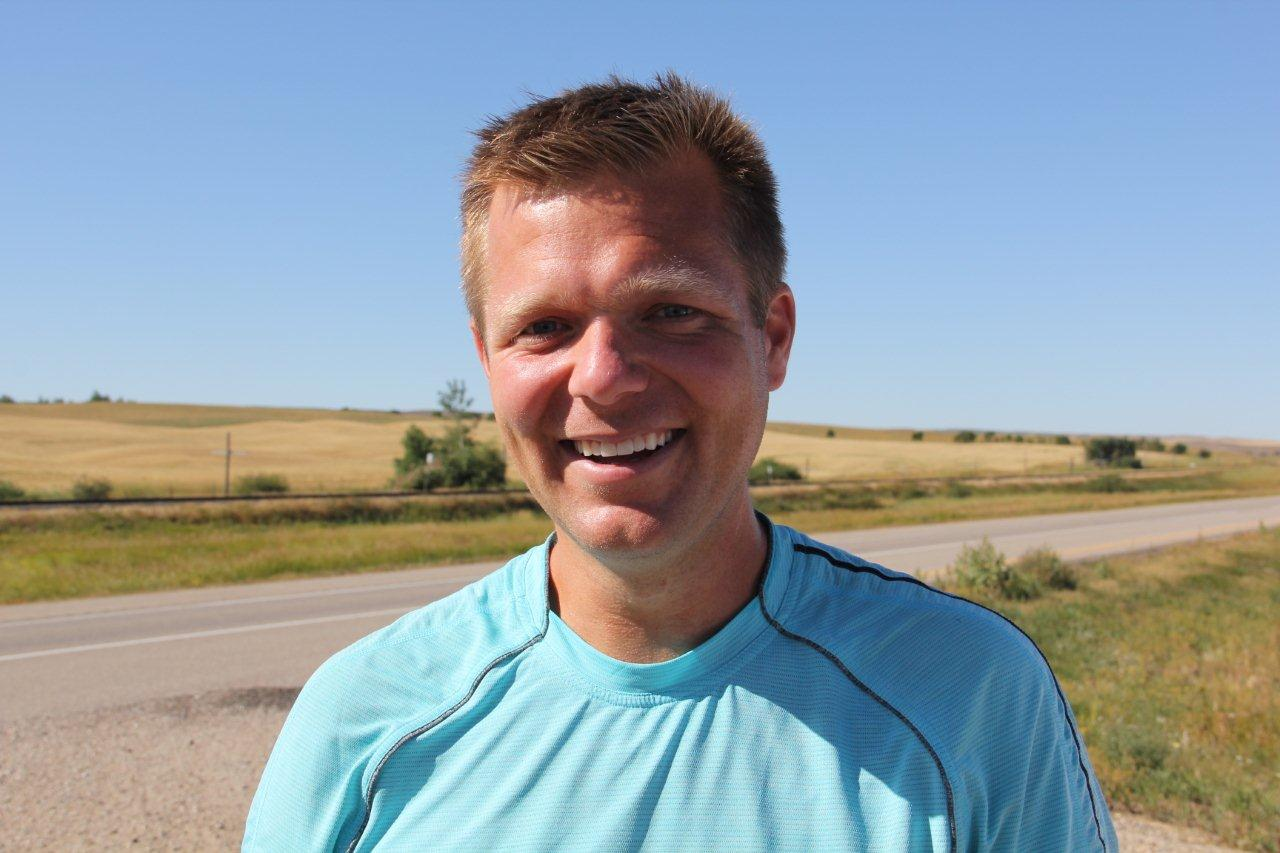
Riley Senft

Riley Senft (born March 16, 1979, in Vancouver, British Columbia) is a Canadian humanitarian, prostate cancer activist, and ultramarathon athlete.

On May 7, 2011, Senft set out to run approximately 6,600 km (4,100 mi) across Canada to raise awareness of prostate cancer and the importance of early detection of the disease, and to raise funds for prostate cancer research.

Senft had lost a grandfather to prostate cancer, and watched his father battle the disease twice in five years. He called his awareness program "Step Into Action" Following in the legacy of Terry Fox, Senft ran approximately 6,600 km across the ten provinces of Canada, from east to west, beginning in Cape Spear, Newfoundland and ending in Vancouver, British Columbia. The purpose of his run was to save the lives of future prostate cancer victims by educating men and women about the steps in early detection.

An experienced athlete, Senft had participated in cycling events in the US to raise money for Habitat for Humanity while a student at Yale University. On October 6, 2011, after 153 days of running upwards of 70 km per day, 6 days a week, Senft officially completed his Step into Action run across Canada when he arrived into Vancouver and finished at the 2010 Winter Olympic Cauldron in Jack Poole Plaza. Upon his arrival, the city of Vancouver lit the Olympic Cauldron aflame in commemoration of his accomplishment.

As of October 2013, Senft and the Step into Action Campaign have raised over Can$838,000 for prostate cancer research, benefiting the Vancouver General Hospital & University of British Columbia Hospital Foundation and the Vancouver Prostate Centre.

During his run, Senft was awarded the keys to the city of Thunder Bay, Ontario from Mayor Keith Hobbs. Vancouver Mayor Gregor Robertson proclaimed October 6, 2011 Dr. Riley Senft Step into Action Prostate Cancer Awareness Day.

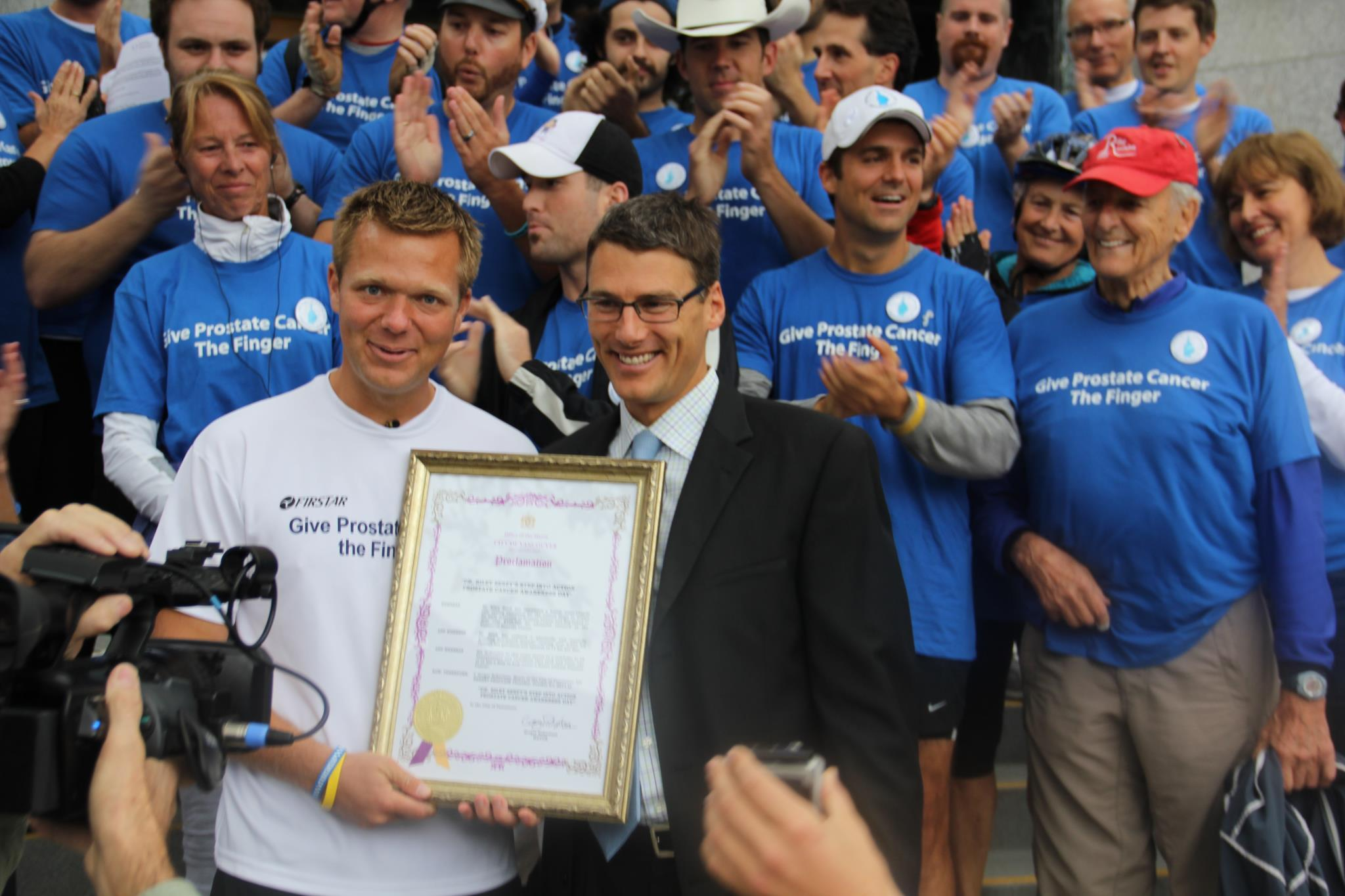
Vancouver Proclamation - Step into Action 2011

After his run ended Senft continued to spread the message of early detection and has given a TEDx Talk about his experience. On June 5, 2013, Senft received the Queen Elizabeth II Diamond Jubilee Medal from Canadian Prime Minister Stephen Harper. Senft currently (as of 2013) lives in Vancouver, BC where he works as an anesthesiologist. He remains an active spokesman for prostate cancer awareness, and the success of his run has led to further fund-raising events by other athletes.
