= Isadore Sharp =

Canadian businessman (born 1931)

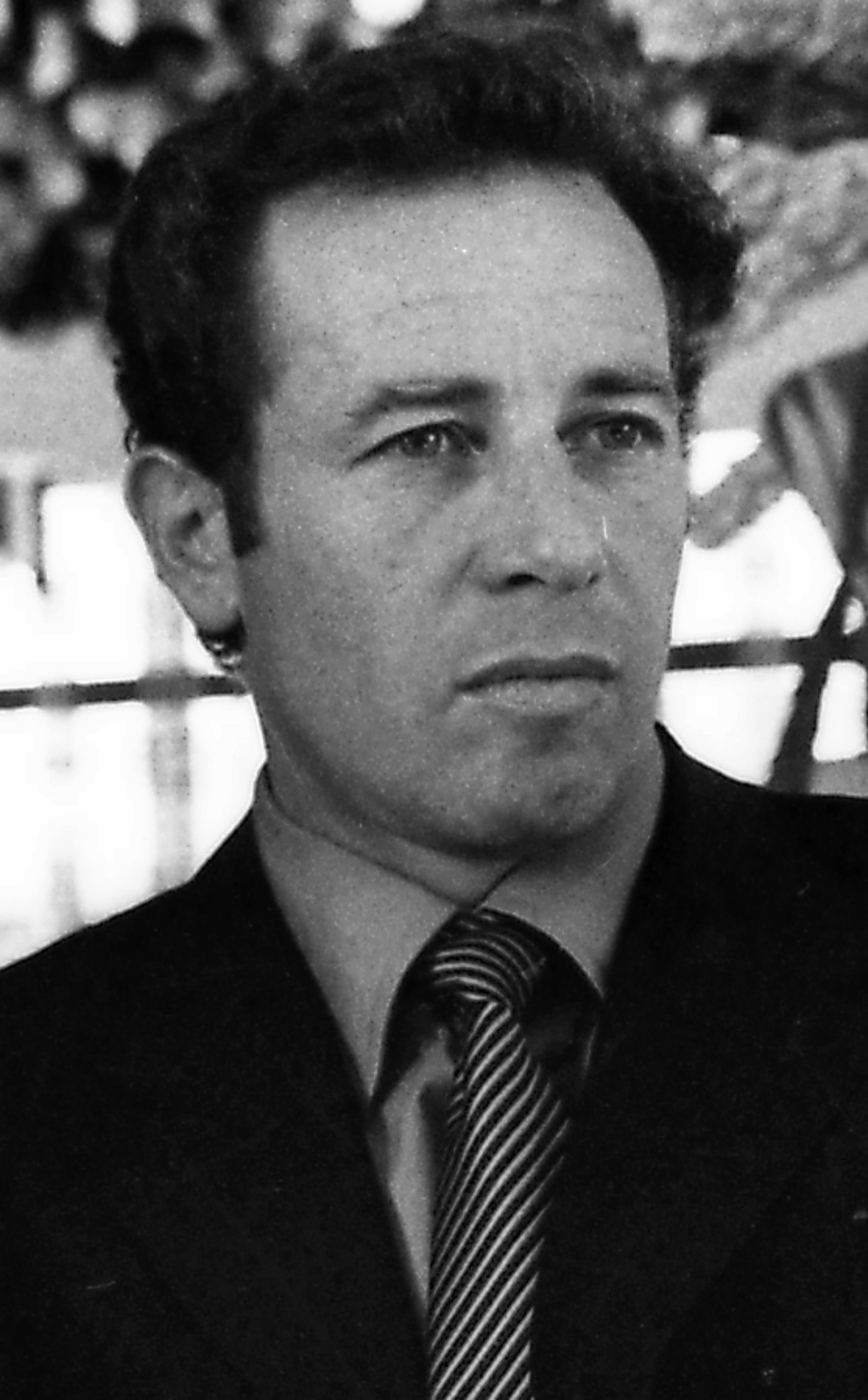
- Isadore Sharp, 1969
- Born: October 8, 1931 (age 94); Toronto, Ontario, Canada
- Occupations: Founder and Chairman, Four Seasons Hotels and Resorts
- Spouse: Rosalie Wise
- Children: Jordan Sharp; Gregory Sharp; Anthony Sharp; Christopher Sharp (deceased)
- Awards: Order of Canada
- Website: Corporate biography

Isadore "Issy" Sharp, OC (born October 8, 1931) is a Canadian hotelier and philanthropist. He is founder and chairman of Four Seasons Hotels and Resorts. He founded the Terry Fox Run.

== Early life and education ==
Sharp was born in Toronto, the son of Polish Jewish immigrants. His father, Max, a devout Torah scholar, was a Polish Jew who emigrated from Poland to the British Mandate of Palestine in 1920, and finally to Toronto five years later. He worked as a plasterer until his family began to grow with the arrival of Issy and three daughters. His father's expertise was in home renovation and he often renovated homes and resold them for a profit as a real estate investor. During the summers, Sharp would obtain experience in the construction business by working for his father. He excelled in sports during his high school years. In 1952, he graduated with high marks from Ryerson Institute of Technology (now Toronto Metropolitan University) with a diploma in architectural technology.

== Career ==
After graduating from Ryerson, Sharp went to work for his father's company full-time as an architect and real estate developer, building apartment buildings and houses. It was his work building a small 22-unit motel (Motel 27) on the outskirts of Toronto for family friend, Jack Gould, that was his introduction to the hospitality business. He founded the Four Seasons Hotel in 1960 and opened the first hotel on Jarvis Street in downtown Toronto in 1961.

On November 6, 2006, American business magnate Bill Gates, through his holding company Cascade Investments LLC, and Saudi businessman, Prince Al-Waleed bin Talal through his company Kingdom Holding Company made an offer to take Four Seasons Hotels private for US$3.4 billion (excluding debt). Sharp would remain chairman and chief executive of the company. He also would be able to realize proceeds from a 1989 incentive plan that would pay him $288 million; the company's headquarters would remain in Toronto.

== Philanthropy ==
Sharp founded and was the director of the Terry Fox Run. He first met Terry Fox when the latter arrived in Montreal in June 1980 during his trek across the country to raise money for cancer research. Sharp invited Fox to rest in one of the city's Four Seasons hotels for a week before resuming his run, helped pay for his cancer treatment, and later pledged to contribute to research funds on his behalf.

Sharp and his wife are prominent Canadian philanthropists, having made significant donations to many sources including the Four Seasons Centre for the Performing Arts, the Ontario College of Art and Design, Mount Sinai Hospital, and the Hebrew University of Jerusalem.

The Sharps are spearheading a proposal to build a Jewish Museum of Canada in Toronto and have pledged $20 million towards the project, towards a total fundraising goal of $150 million. The museum is to feature three themed galleries with artifact and multimedia-based interactives and three immersive environments entitled: Jewish Experience, Jewish Life in Canada and The Neuberger Holocaust Education Centre.

== Personal life ==
Sharp married his high school sweetheart, Rosalie Wise, who was also of Jewish descent. They had four sons, Jordan, Gregory, Anthony, and Christopher. Christopher, the only one who evinced an interest in going into the family business, died of melanoma in 1978. His death at least partly inspired Sharp to support Fox financially during his run. A Ty Beanie Baby named Issy was produced in 2001 in Christopher's memory. All proceeds from American sales went to Memorial Sloan–Kettering Cancer Center in New York, while all Canadian proceeds went to the Terry Fox Foundation.

Sharp had a net worth of Can$540 million in 2009. In 2009, Sharp summarized his experience and business philosophy in a book Four Seasons: The Story of a Business Philosophy, published by Viking Canada. In 2011, a documentary about Sharp's life and achievements, The Four Seasons of Isadore Sharp, aired on City TV.

== Directorships ==
- Honorary Director Scotiabank
- Director of Clairvest Group, Inc.
- Director of the National Terry Fox Run
- Director of Canadian Unity Council
- Governor of the Canadian Council of Christians and Jews
- Honorary Officer of the Board of Directors Mount Sinai Hospital, Toronto

== Honours ==
- In 2022, he was recognized by the International Hospitality Institute on the Global 100 in Hospitality list, featuring the 100 Most Powerful People in Global.
- In 2013 was awarded the Horatio Alger Award
- In 2011 was awarded a Lifetime Achievement Award from the International Luxury Travel Mart
- In 2010 was inducted into the Hall of Leaders by the US Travel Association
- In 2009 was awarded an Honorary Doctor of Laws degree from York University
- In 2009 was awarded a Lifetime Achievement Award from the International Hotel Investment Fund
- In 2008 was named a Companion to the Order from the Canadian Business Hall of Fame (first inducted in 1998)
- In 2008 was awarded the Visionary Awards from the Marketing Hall of Legends
- In 2006 was awarded the Business Leader Award from the Ivey Alumni Association/Toronto
- In 2005 was awarded the Outstanding Philanthropist Award from the Association of Fundraising Professionals Greater Toronto Chapter
- In 2005 was awarded the Honorary Associate Award from The Conference Board of Canada
- In 2005 was awarded a Lifetime Achievement Award from the American Lodging Investment Summit
- In 2005 was named a Canadian Hotel Industry Icon by the Canadian Hotel Investment Conference
- In 2003 was awarded a Lifetime Achievement Award from the Ontario Ernst & Young Entrepreneur of the Year Program
- In 2003 was awarded an Honorary Doctor of Commerce degree from Toronto Metropolitan University (formerly Ryerson University)
- In 1999 was awarded the International Distinguished Entrepreneur Award by I.H. Asper School of Business of the University of Manitoba
- In 1999 was awarded the Distinguished Service Award in International Rehabilitation from the New York-based World Rehabilitation Fund
- In 1998 was awarded the Alumni Award of Distinction from Toronto Metropolitan University
- In 1994 was awarded an Honorary Doctor of Laws degree by the University of Toronto
- In 1993 was made an Officer of the Order of Canada
- In 1992 was named CEO of the Year by the Financial Post Magazine
- In 1992 was awarded an Honorary Doctor of Laws degree from the University of Guelph
- In 1983 he was Ruth Hartman Frankel Humanitarian Award for his support of Terry Fox and the subsequent Terry Fox Run.
