= Mount Terry Fox Provincial Park =

Provincial park in British Columbia, Canada

- IUCN category II (national park)
- Location within British Columbia
- Interactive map of Mount Terry Fox Provincial Park
- Location: British Columbia, Canada
- Nearest city: Valemount
- Coordinates: 52°56′41″N 119°15′28″W
- Area: 19.3 km^{2} (7.5 sq mi)
- Established: June 23, 1982
- Governing body: BC Parks

Mount Terry Fox Provincial Park is a provincial park in British Columbia, Canada. It is located in the Rocky Mountains near Mount Robson and the city of Valemount, British Columbia. The park and Mount Terry Fox, which is within the park, are named in honor of amputee long-distance runner and cancer research activist Terry Fox, a native of Winnipeg, Manitoba who grew up in British Columbia.
