= Terry Fox Secondary School =

- Terry Fox Secondary main entrance and statue

Location
- 1260 Riverwood Gate; Port Coquitlam, British Columbia, V3B 7Z5; Canada; 49.263°N 122.748°W

Information
- Former name: Port Coquitlam Senior Secondary School
- Type: Secondary school
- Motto: "We Pursue Excellence"
- Founded: 1950s
- School board: School District 43 Coquitlam
- Superintendent: Nadine Tambellini
- Area trustee: Michael Thomas
- School number: 04343136
- Principal: Mr. Ross Jacobsen
- Grades: 9-12
- Enrollment: 1622 (2025/26)
- Language: English
- Colours: Black & Red
- Team name: Terry Fox Ravens
- Website: www.sd43.bc.ca/terryfox/
- Last updated: October 17, 2026

Terry Fox Secondary School is a school with approximately 1622 students in Port Coquitlam, British Columbia, Canada. The original building was built in the 1950s under the name Port Coquitlam Senior Secondary School for grades 11 and 12. In 1986, it was renamed Terry Fox Senior Secondary School after 1976 graduate Terry Fox. The "Senior" was dropped from the name after a restructuring by Coquitlam School District 43, when junior high schools were replaced by middle schools.

Terry Fox Secondary's Code of Conduct is compatible with the District Code of Conduct, The BC Human Rights Code, and they also acknowledge their own four pillars of Leadership, Integrity, Kindness, and Perseverance.

In 1999, to help deal with the growing population, the school was relocated to a new, larger building, several kilometres away on Riverwood Gate. However, the new building quickly became overpopulated as well, and is now home to 17 portable classrooms. Fox offers a wide variety of academic courses and programs at all levels.

The Terry Fox football team has also taken part in an exchange with the football team from St. Mark Catholic High School (Ottawa) from Manotick, Ontario since 2009.

== Provincial championships ==
| Year | Team |
|---|---|
| 1989 | Senior Boys AA Football |
| 1993 | Senior Boys AAA Basketball |
| 1994 | Senior Boys AAA Basketball |
| 2006 | Junior Boys AAA Football |
| 2006 | Senior Boys AAA Football |
| 2007 | Junior Boys AAA Football |
| 2008 | Senior Boys AAA Football |
| 2012 | Senior Boys AAA Basketball |
| 2012 | Junior Boys AAA Football |
| 2016 | Senior Boys AAA Football |
| 2019 | Junior Girls Basketball |
| 2022 | Senior Girls AAAA Basketball |

== Notable alumni ==
| Name | Grad Class | Notability |
|---|---|---|
| Bret Anderson | 1993 | Former BC Lions slot back |
| Sandy Beveridge | 1999 | Former Hamilton Tiger-Cats safety |
| Sukh Chungh | 2010 | Winnipeg Blue Bombers offensive lineman |
| Lynn Colliar | 1985 | Anchor of Global BC's Morning News |
| Terry Fox | 1976 | Ran the Marathon of Hope, namesake of the school |
| Dawson Hodge | 2020 | Canadian Football Player |
| Con Kudaba | 2005 | 2008 Olympian ( Beijing ) Canadian National Water Polo Team |
| Pia Guerra | 1990 | Comic book artist |
| Jamall Lee | 2005 | Ed Herberts award recipient, 2006 BCAA AAA Provincial All Star, Football Athlete of the Year, BC Lions Running Back |
| Rachel Marsden | 1992 | Political commentator, Columnist, CNN contributor, Fox News co-host |
| Dan Payne | 1984 | Canadian Football League offensive linesman and Olympic wrestler |
| Christopher Rinke | 1978 | Olympic wrestler. 1984 Bronze medalist in the Men's Freestyle Middleweight (82 kg) category |
| Steve Skroce | 1991 | Comic book and movie storyboard artist |
| Chris Szarka | 1993 | Former Saskatchewan Roughriders fullback |
| Ian Tracey | 1982 | Actor (Da Vinci's Inquest, Intelligence, Huckleberry Finn and His Friends) |
| Keanu Pires | 2009 | Actor (The Sandlot: Heading Home) |
| Brittany Rogers | 2011 | Olympic Gymnast |
| Mark Okerstrom | 1991 | Former CEO of Expedia Group |
| Whitney Peak | 2021 | Actress (Gossip Girl, Home Before Dark, Chilling Adventures of Sabrina) |

== Terry Fox Theatre ==
Terry Fox Theatre entrance

The Terry Fox Theatre, formerly run by the school itself but now operated by an independent charity, adjoins the north side of the school. The school is noted for its many musicals and plays including You're a Good Man, Charlie Brown, Footloose, Hair, The Wedding Singer and Jesus Christ Superstar, Tough, Daddy's Home, The Effect of Gamma Rays on Man-in-the-Moon Marigolds, Of Mice and Men and The 25th Annual Putnam County Spelling Bee. In 2010, Terry Fox Secondary became District Champions of "MetFest" with the musical comedy The 25th Annual Putnam County Spelling Bee, going on to represent Terry Fox Secondary at the Sears British Columbia Drama Festival] where they were awarded 'Best Actor in a Leading Role - Female', 'Special Merit Award for Musical Virtuosity', and 'Best Ensemble/ Choreography'. In 2011, Terry Fox's show "Am I Blue" became District Champions at "MetFest".
