= Terry Fox Theatre =

Theatre in British Columbia, Canada

Coordinates: 49.263147°N 122.748161°W

The Terry Fox Theatre is a proscenium theatre in Port Coquitlam, British Columbia, opened in 1999, named after cancer research activist Terry Fox. Although attached to Terry Fox Secondary School, the theatre is operated as a stand-alone facility by the Port Coquitlam Theatre Society, a registered federal charity governed by a volunteer board of directors.

== Overview ==
The theatre has 336 seats, with 234 seats at orchestra level, and 102 seats on the balcony.
