= Terry Fox Memorial and Lookout =

Public monument near Thunder Bay, Ontario

Terry Fox Memorial Lookout
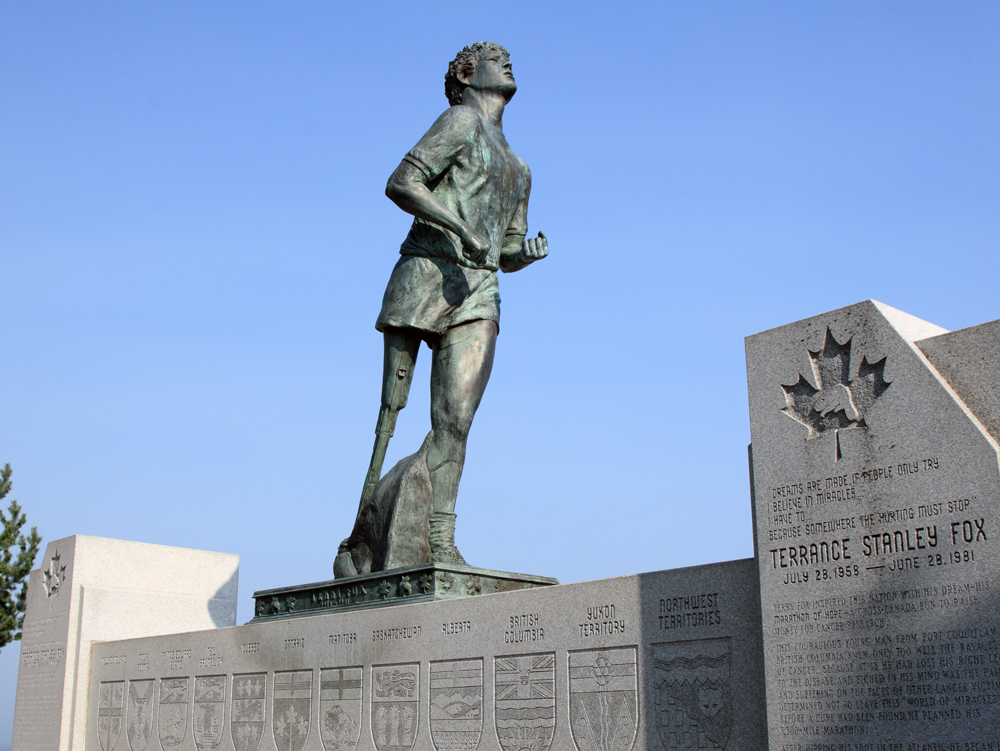
- Terry Fox Monument
- Interactive map of Terry Fox Memorial Lookout
- Location: Thunder Bay, Ontario, Canada
- Coordinates: 48°29′06″N 89°10′07″W
- Completion date: June 26, 1982
- Dedicated to: Terry Fox

The Terry Fox Monument, situated in the outskirts of Thunder Bay, Ontario, Canada, is a public monument commemorating cancer research activist Terry Fox's Marathon of Hope. The monument, which depicts Fox, is open to the public and offers a panoramic view of Thunder Bay and its surroundings.

== History ==
The statue was created by sculptor Manfred Pirwitz to mark the place where Fox was forced to stop his run on August 31, 1980. It is approximately four kilometres (2 1/2 miles) west of the exact spot where Fox ended his run, which is marked by a road sign.

The monument was dedicated on June 26, 1982, just days before the first anniversary of Terry Fox's death, by Governor General Edward Schreyer.

Originally located directly along the route of Highway 17, the statue was later relocated to a dedicated park overlooking the highway to accommodate the widening of the highway route.

By 1989, municipal politicians in Thunder Bay were beginning to call for a provincial tourist information centre, with washrooms on site, to be built at the monument due to reports that some visitors to the site were urinating and defecating in the bushes surrounding the site. An information centre was built on the site at the time of relocation.

Following the monument's relocation in the 1990s, several incidents of vandalism were reported on the site, including littering with empty alcohol bottles and hypodermic needles, amethysts being pried off the statue's base, damage to the onsite washrooms, one of the statue's hands being sawed off, and an aborted partial attempt to saw off the statue's head.

== Cultural significance ==
Many later public events have revolved in some way around the monument. On Steve Fonyo's subsequent Journey for Lives run, he stopped at the monument to reflect before moving forward into the part of the run that Fox was never able to complete.

In 1997, a quadriplegic named Dave Shannon stopped at the monument as part of his own cross-Canada trek for disability awareness.

In 2000, Fox's surviving family members held a public event at the monument to commemorate the 20th anniversary of the beginning of Fox's run.

For the Olympic torch relay across Canada prior to the 2010 Winter Olympics in Vancouver, a cancer survivor named Kailie Kernaghan-Keast was chosen for the leg of the run east of Thunder Bay, with the Terry Fox Monument chosen as the location for her to hand off to the next runner.
