= Terry Fox =

Canadian athlete (1958–1981)

Terry Fox CC OD
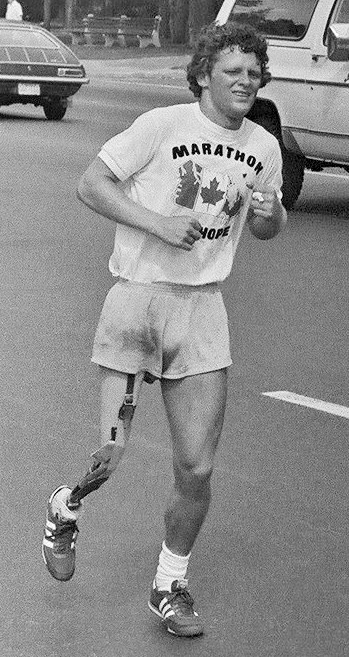
- Terry Fox in Toronto during his Marathon of Hope cross-country run (July 1980)
- Born: Terrance Stanley Fox; July 28, 1958; Winnipeg, Manitoba, Canada
- Died: June 28, 1981 (aged 22); New Westminster, British Columbia, Canada
- Cause of death: Osteosarcoma
- Education: Simon Fraser University
- Known for: Marathon of Hope
- Title: Companion of the Order of Canada
- Mother: Betty Fox

Terrance Stanley Fox (July 28, 1958 – June 28, 1981) was a Canadian athlete, humanitarian, and cancer research activist. In 1980, having had one leg amputated due to cancer, he embarked on a cross-Canada run to raise money and awareness for cancer research. The annual Terry Fox Run, first held in 1981, has grown to involve millions of participants in over 60 countries and is the world's largest one-day fundraiser for cancer research; over C$1 billion has been raised in his name through the Terry Fox Research Institute as of February 2026.

Fox was a distance runner and basketball player for Port Coquitlam Senior Secondary School, later named after him, and Simon Fraser University. His right leg was amputated in 1977 after he was diagnosed with osteosarcoma, though he continued to run using an artificial leg. He also played wheelchair basketball in Vancouver, winning three national championships.

On April 12, 1980, he began the Marathon of Hope to raise money for cancer research. He hoped to raise one dollar from each of Canada's 24 million people at the time. He began with little fanfare from St. John's, Newfoundland and Labrador, and ran the equivalent of a full marathon every day. He had become a national star by the time he reached Ontario, and made numerous public appearances with businessmen, athletes, and politicians in his efforts to raise money. He was forced to end his run outside Thunder Bay on September 1, 1980, after the cancer spread to his lungs. He died nine months later on June 28, 1981.

Fox was the youngest person named a Companion of the Order of Canada and won the 1980 Lou Marsh Award as the nation's top sportsman. He was named Canada's Newsmaker of the Year in both 1980 and 1981 by The Canadian Press. Considered a national hero, he has had many buildings, statues, roads, and parks named in his honour across the country.

== Early life and cancer ==
Terrance Stanley Fox was born on July 28, 1958, in Winnipeg, Manitoba, to Rolland and Betty Fox. Rolland was a switchman for the Canadian National Railway. Fox spent his childhood in the Transcona suburb of Winnipeg, where he attended Wayoata Elementary School. Fox had an elder brother, Fred, a younger brother, Darrell, and a younger sister, Judith. Fox's maternal grandmother was Métis, and Fox's younger brother Darrell became a member of the Métis Nation of British Columbia.

Fox's family moved to Surrey in British Columbia in 1966, then settled in Port Coquitlam in 1968. He had doting parents, and his father recalled that he was extremely competitive. He attempted to join his school's basketball team, but struggled because of his height. His coach suggested that he try cross-country running, which he did in order to impress his coach. Fox continued to improve on his basketball skills, and in grade 12 he won his high school's athlete of the year award. He was unsure whether he wanted to go to university, but his mother convinced him to enrol at Simon Fraser University. He studied kinesiology with the intention of becoming a physical education teacher. He was also a member of the junior varsity basketball team.

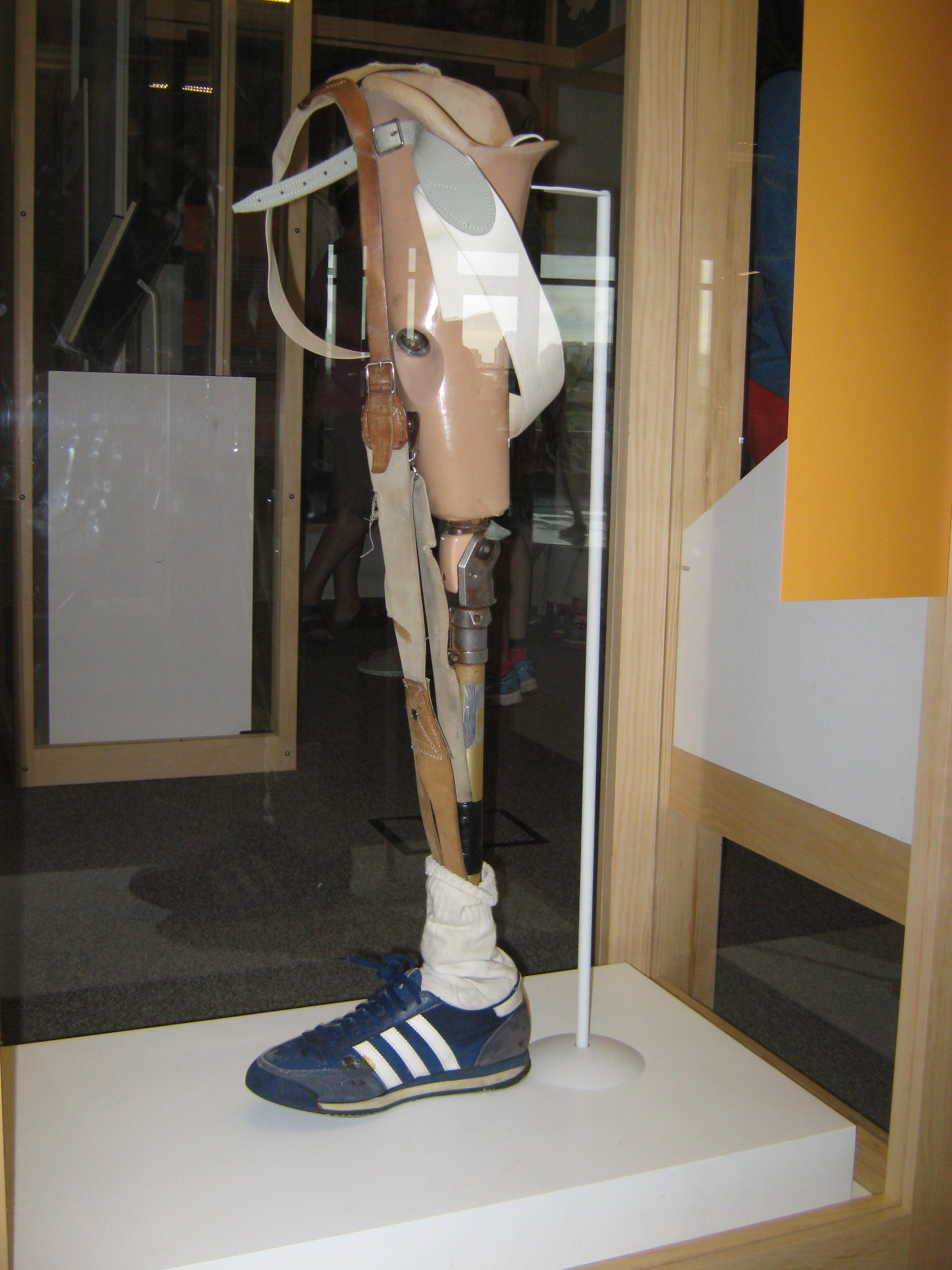
Fox's favourite prosthetic leg used during his Marathon of Hope, on display at the Canadian Museum of History

On November 12, 1976, Fox was driving to the family home in Port Coquitlam when he was distracted by nearby bridge construction and crashed into the back of a pickup truck. He injured his right knee in the crash and felt pain in December, but did not seek treatment until the end of basketball season. By March 1977, the pain had intensified and he went to a hospital, where he was diagnosed with osteosarcoma, a form of cancer that often starts near the knees. Fox believed the crash weakened his knee and left it vulnerable to the disease, though his doctors argued that there was no connection. He was told that his leg had to be amputated, he would require chemotherapy treatment, and that recent medical advances meant he had a 50 per cent chance of survival. He learned that two years before, the figure would have been only 15 per cent; the improvement in survival rates impressed on him the value of cancer research. With the help of an artificial leg, Fox was walking three weeks after the amputation. Doctors were impressed with his positive outlook, saying it contributed to his rapid recovery. He underwent sixteen months of chemotherapy, and found the time he spent in the British Columbia Cancer Control Agency facility difficult as he watched fellow cancer patients suffer and die from the disease.

In the summer of 1977, Rick Hansen, working with the Canadian Wheelchair Sports Association, invited Fox to try out for his wheelchair basketball team. Less than two months after learning how to play the sport, he was named a member of the team for the national championship in Edmonton, Alberta. He won three national titles with the team, and was named an all-star by the North American Wheelchair Basketball Association in 1980.

== Marathon of Hope ==
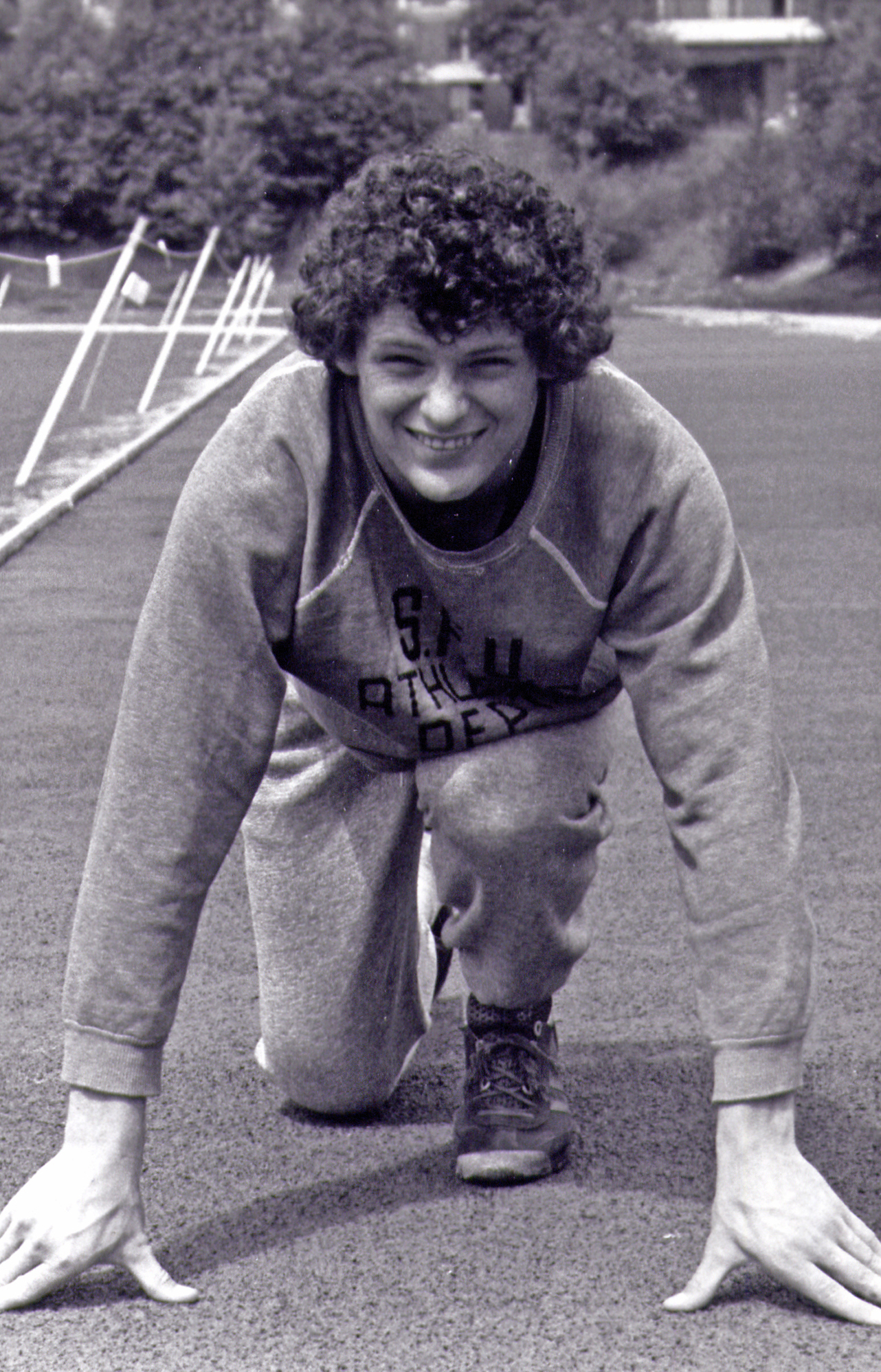
Fox on the SFU track, 1979

The night before his cancer surgery, Fox had been given an article about Dick Traum, the first amputee to complete the New York City Marathon. The article inspired him; he embarked on a 14-month training program, telling his family he planned to compete in a marathon himself. In private, he devised a more extensive plan. His hospital experiences had made Fox angry at how little money was dedicated to cancer research. He intended to run the length of Canada in the hope of increasing cancer awareness, a goal he initially divulged only to his friend Douglas Alward.

Fox ran with an unusual gait, as he was required to hop-step on his good leg due to the extra time the springs in his artificial leg required to reset after each step. He found the training painful as the additional pressure he had to place on both his good leg and his stump led to bone bruises, blisters, and intense pain. Fox found that after about 20 minutes of each run, he crossed a pain threshold and the run became easier.

On September 2, 1979, Fox competed in a 17-mile (27 km) road race in Prince George. He finished in last place, ten minutes behind his closest competitor, but his effort was met with tears and applause from the other participants. Following the marathon, he revealed his full plan to his family. His mother discouraged him, angering Fox, though she later came to support the project. She recalled, "He said, 'I thought you'd be one of the first persons to believe in me.' And I wasn't. I was the first person who let him down". Fox initially hoped to raise $1 million, then $10 million, but later sought to raise $1 for each of Canada's 24 million citizens.

=== Preparation ===
On October 15, 1979, Fox sent a letter to the Canadian Cancer Society in which he announced his goal and appealed for funding. He stated that he would "conquer" his disability, and promised to complete his run, even if he had to "crawl every last mile". Explaining why he wanted to raise money for research, Fox described his personal experience of cancer treatment:

I soon realized that that would only be half my quest, for as I went through the 16 months of the physically and emotionally draining ordeal of chemotherapy, I was rudely awakened by the feelings that surrounded and coursed through the cancer clinic. There were faces with the brave smiles, and the ones who had given up smiling. There were feelings of hopeful denial, and the feelings of despair. My quest would not be a selfish one. I could not leave knowing these faces and feelings would still exist, even though I would be set free from mine. Somewhere the hurting must stop ... and I was determined to take myself to the limit for this cause.

Fox closed his letter with the statement: "We need your help. The people in cancer clinics all over the world need people who believe in miracles. I am not a dreamer, and I am not saying that this will initiate any kind of definitive answer or cure to cancer. I believe in miracles. I have to."

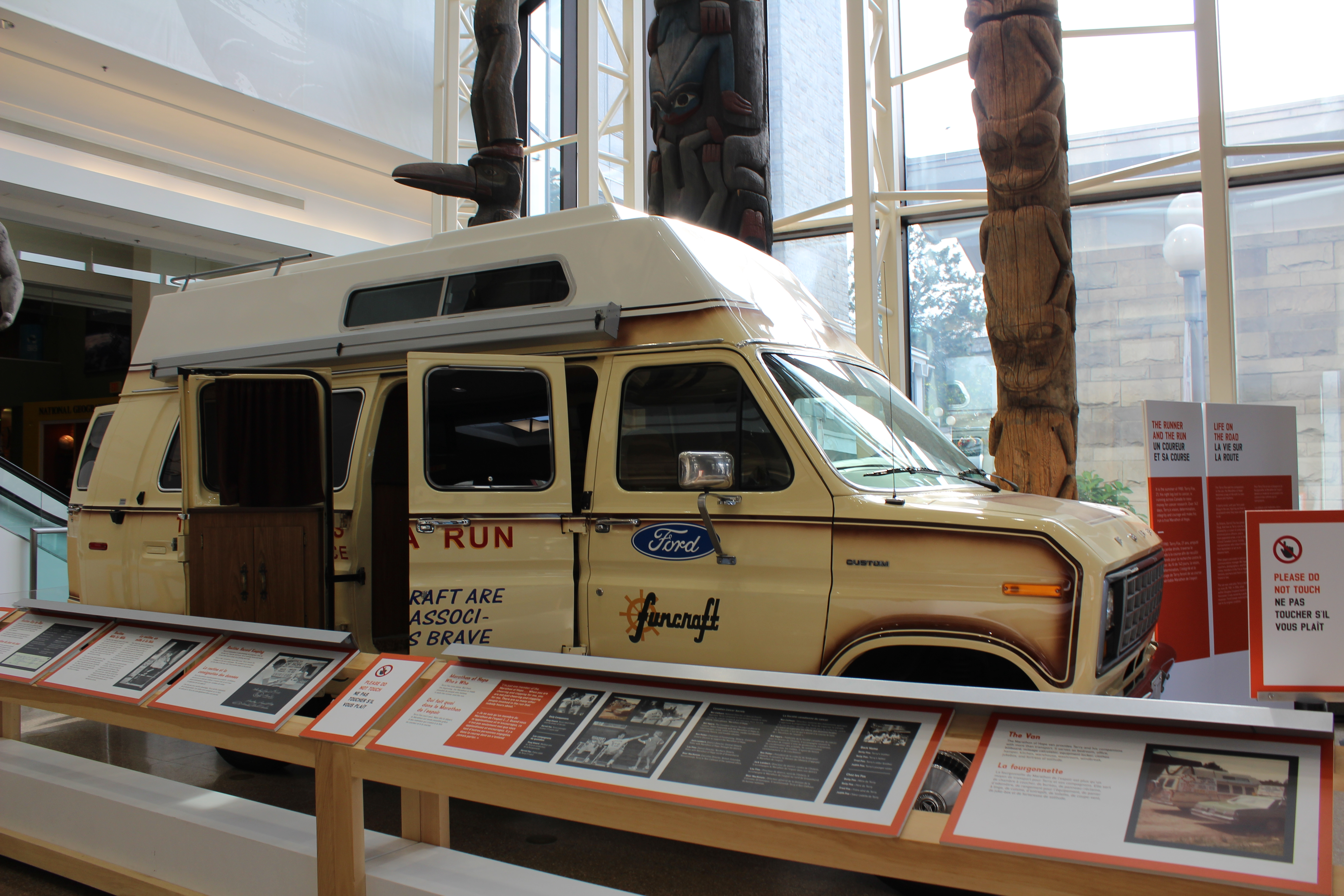
The van used in the Marathon of Hope on display at the Royal British Columbia Museum

The Cancer Society was skeptical of his success but agreed to support Fox once he had acquired sponsors and requested he get a medical certificate from a heart specialist stating that he was fit to attempt the run. Fox was diagnosed with left ventricular hypertrophy – an enlarged heart – a condition commonly associated with athletes. Doctors warned Fox of the potential risks he faced, though they did not consider his condition a significant concern. They endorsed his participation when he promised that he would stop immediately if he began to experience any heart problems.

A second letter was sent to several corporations seeking donations for a vehicle and running shoes, and to cover the other costs of the run. Fox sent other letters asking for grants to buy a running leg. The Ford Motor Company donated a camper van, while Imperial Oil contributed fuel, and Adidas his running shoes. Fox turned away any company that requested he endorse their products and refused any donation that carried conditions, as he insisted that nobody was to profit from his run.

=== Start of the marathon ===
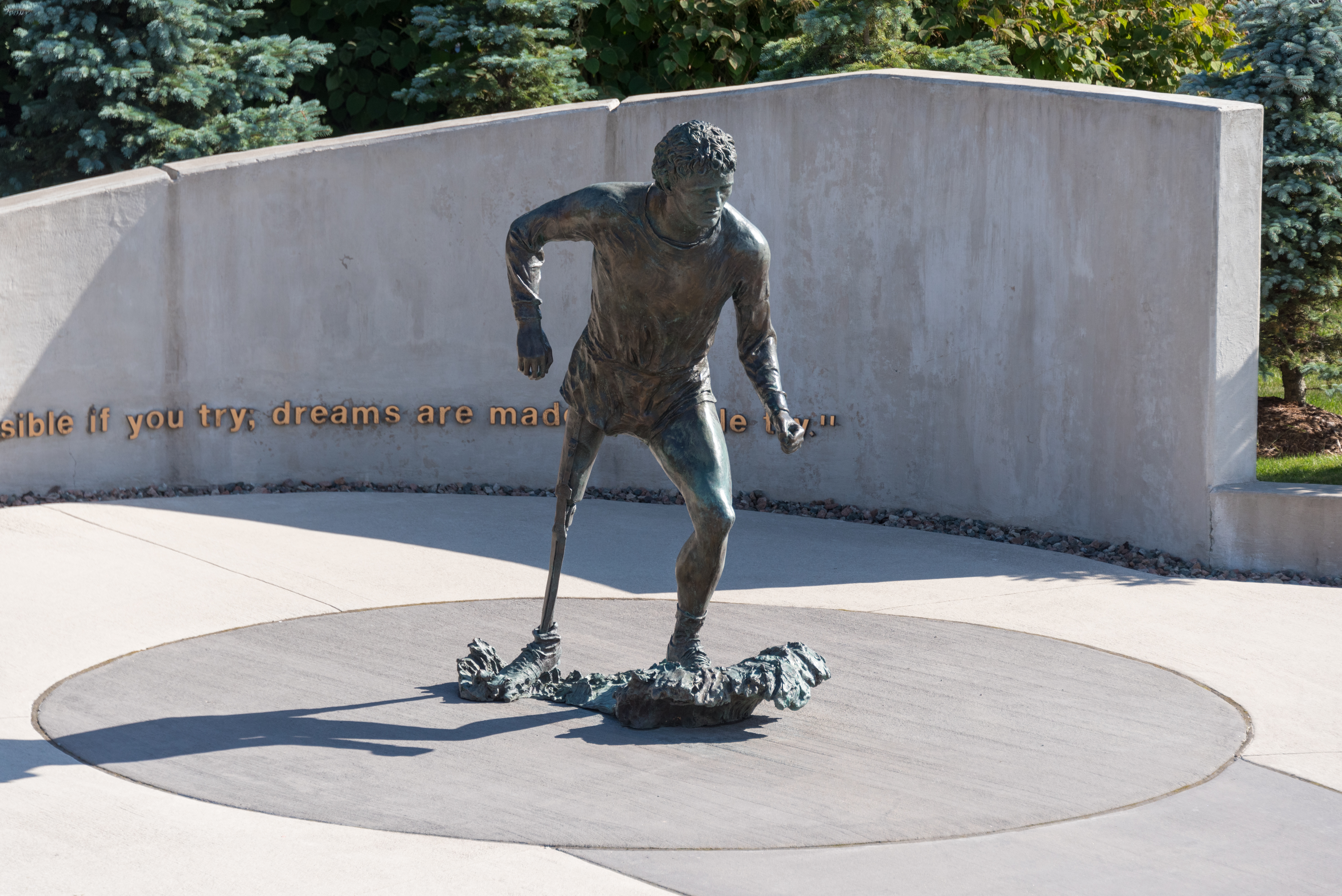
Terry Fox Statue at Mile 0 in St. John's, Canada

The Marathon began on April 12, 1980, when Fox dipped his right leg in the Atlantic Ocean near St. John's, Newfoundland and Labrador, and filled two large bottles with ocean water. He intended to keep one as a souvenir and pour the other into the Pacific Ocean upon completing his journey at Victoria, British Columbia. Fox was supported on his run by Doug Alward, who drove the van and cooked meals.

Fox was met with gale-force winds, heavy rain, and a snowstorm in the first days of his run. He was initially disappointed with the reception he received but was heartened upon arriving in Channel-Port aux Basques, Newfoundland and Labrador, where the town's 10,000 residents presented him with a donation of over $10,000. Throughout the trip, Fox frequently expressed his anger and frustration to those he saw as impeding the run, and he fought regularly with Alward. When they reached Nova Scotia, they were barely on speaking terms, and it was arranged for Fox's brother Darrell, then 17, to join them as a buffer.

Fox left the Maritimes on June 10 and faced new challenges upon entering Quebec due to his group's inability to speak French and drivers who continually forced him off the road. Fox arrived in Montreal on June 22, one-third of the way through his 8,000-kilometre (5,000 mi) journey, having collected over $200,000 in donations. Fox's run caught the attention of Isadore Sharp, the founder and CEO of Four Seasons Hotels and Resorts, who lost a son to melanoma in 1978 just a year after Terry's diagnosis. Sharp gave food and accommodation at his hotels to Fox's team. When Fox was discouraged because so few people were making donations, Sharp pledged $2 a mile and persuaded close to 1,000 other corporations to do the same. Fox was convinced by the Canadian Cancer Society that arriving in Ottawa for Canada Day would aid fundraising efforts, so he remained in Montreal for a few extra days.

=== Ontario and marathon's end ===
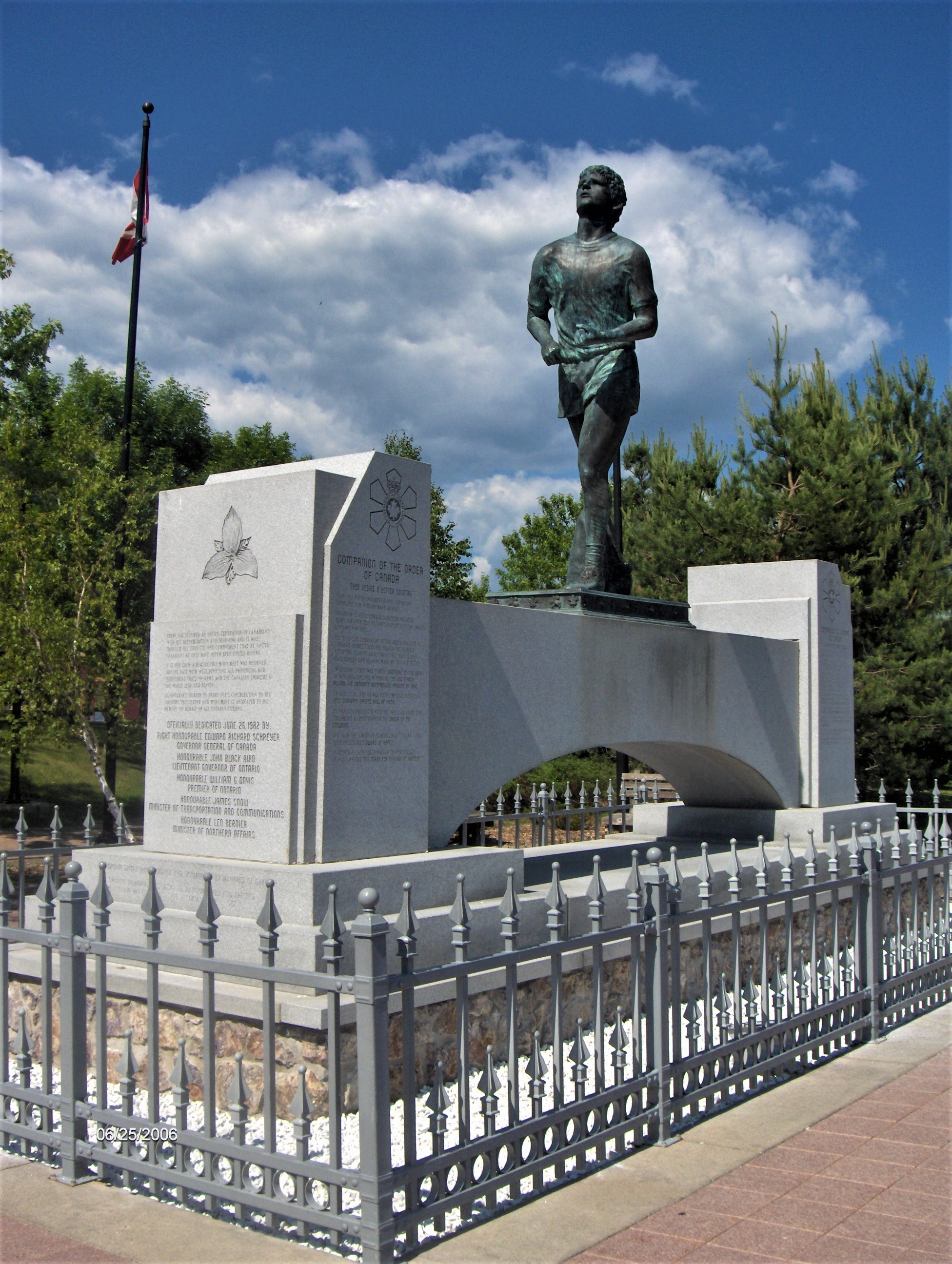
The Terry Fox Monument in Thunder Bay

Fox crossed into Ontario on the last Saturday in June, and he was met by a brass band and thousands of residents who lined the streets to cheer him on, while the Ontario Provincial Police gave him an escort throughout the province. Despite the sweltering heat of summer, he continued to run 26 miles (42 km) per day. On his arrival in Ottawa, Fox met Governor General Ed Schreyer, Prime Minister Pierre Trudeau, and was the guest of honour at numerous sporting events in the city. In front of over 16,000 fans, he performed a ceremonial kickoff at a Canadian Football League game between the Ottawa Rough Riders and Saskatchewan Roughriders, and was given a standing ovation. Fox's journal reflected his growing excitement at the reception he had received.

On July 11, Fox arrived in Toronto where a crowd of 10,000 people met him and he was honoured in Nathan Phillips Square. As he ran to the square, he was joined on the road by many people, including National Hockey League star Darryl Sittler, who presented Fox with his 1980 All-Star Game jersey. The Cancer Society estimated it collected $100,000 in donations that day alone. That evening he threw the ceremonial first pitch at Exhibition Stadium preceding a baseball game between the Toronto Blue Jays and the Cleveland Indians. As he continued through southern Ontario, he was met by hockey star Bobby Orr who presented him with a cheque for $25,000. Fox considered meeting Orr the highlight of his journey.

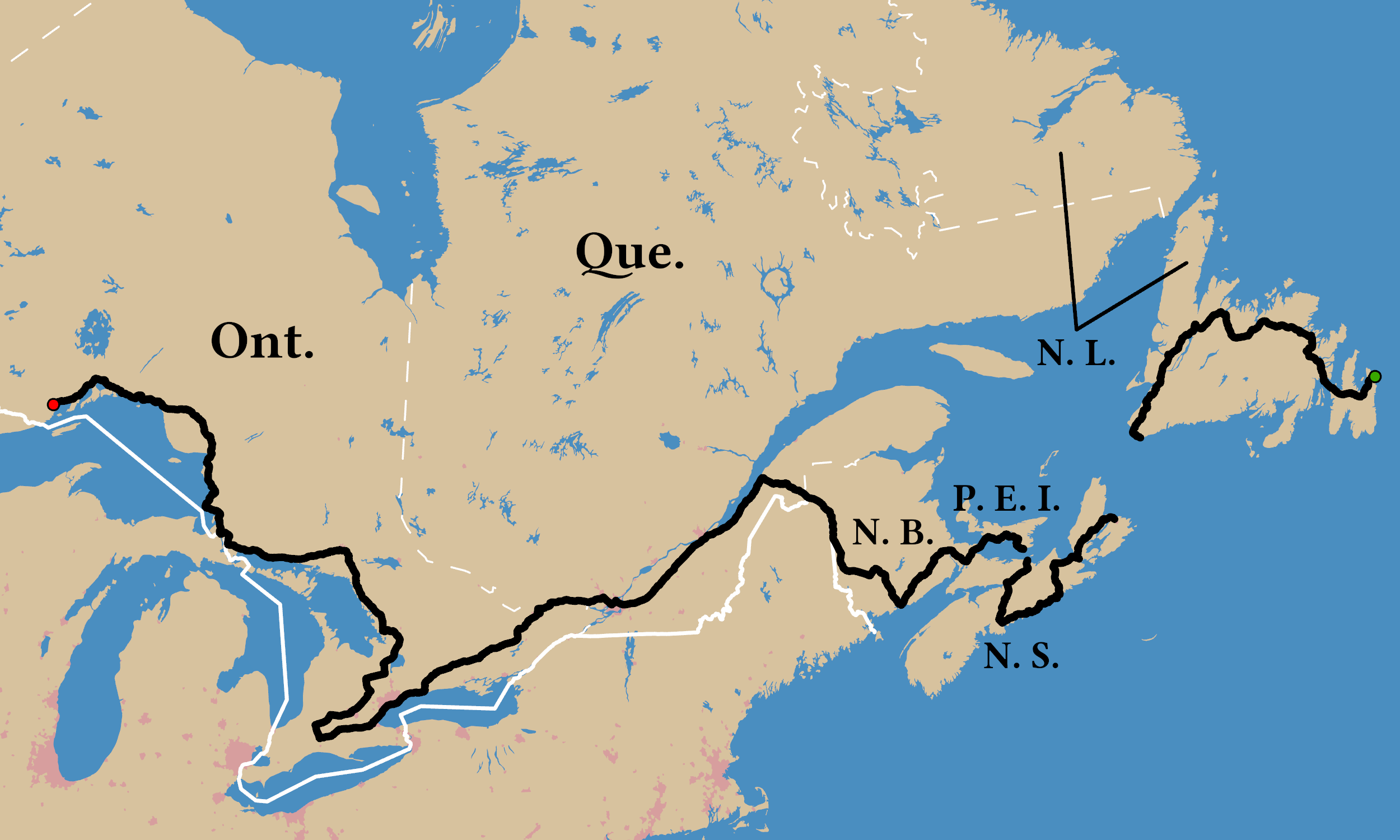
Fox's path across eastern Canada. He began at St. John's on the east coast and ran west.

As Fox's fame grew, the Cancer Society scheduled him to attend more functions and give more speeches. Fox attempted to accommodate any request that he believed would raise money, no matter how far out of his way it took him. He bristled, however, at what he felt were media intrusions into his personal life, for example when the Toronto Star reported that he had gone on a date. Fox was left unsure whom he could trust in the media after negative articles began to emerge, including one by The Globe and Mail that highlighted tensions with his brother Darrell and claimed he was running because he held a grudge against a doctor who had misdiagnosed his condition, allegations he referred to as "trash".

The physical demands of running a marathon every day took their toll on Fox's body. Apart from the rest days in Montreal taken at the request of the Cancer Society, he refused to take a day off, even on his 22nd birthday. He frequently had shin splints and an inflamed knee. He developed cysts on his stump and experienced dizzy spells. At one point, he had a soreness in his ankle that would not go away. Although he feared he had developed a stress fracture, he ran for three more days before seeking medical attention, and was then relieved to learn it was tendonitis and could be treated with painkillers. Fox rejected calls for him to seek regular medical checkups, and dismissed suggestions he was risking his future health. By late August, Fox described that he was exhausted before he began the day's run. On September 1, outside Thunder Bay, he was forced to stop briefly after he had an intense coughing fit and experienced pains in his chest. He resumed running as the crowds along the highway shouted out their encouragement. A few miles later, short of breath and with continued chest pain, he asked Alward to drive him to a hospital. The next day, Fox held a tearful press conference during which he announced that his cancer had returned and spread to his lungs. He was forced to end his run after 143 days and 5,373 kilometres (3,339 mi). Fox refused offers to complete the run in his stead, stating that he wanted to complete his marathon himself.

=== National response ===
External videos
- " The Terry Fox Story" – Terry Fox Foundation (4:03 min)

Fox had raised $1.7 million (equivalent to $6 million in 2025) when he was forced to abandon the Marathon. A week after his run ended, the CTV Television Network organized a nationwide telethon in support of Fox and the Canadian Cancer Society. Supported by Canadian and international celebrities, the five-hour event raised $10.5 million (equivalent to $39 million in 2025). Among the donations were $1 million each by the governments of British Columbia and Ontario, the former to create a new research institute to be founded in Fox's name and the latter an endowment given to the Ontario Cancer Treatment and Research Foundation. Donations continued throughout the winter, and by April over $23 million had been raised (equivalent to $76 million in 2025).

Supporters and well-wishers from around the world inundated Fox with letters and tokens of support. At one point, he was receiving more mail than the rest of Port Coquitlam combined. Such was his fame that one letter sent from the United States addressed simply to "Terry Fox, Canada" was successfully delivered.

In September 1980, Fox was invested in a special ceremony as a Companion of the Order of Canada; he was, and remains, the youngest person to be so honoured. The Lieutenant Governor of British Columbia named him to the Order of the Dogwood, the province's highest award. Canada's Sports Hall of Fame commissioned a permanent exhibit, and Fox was named the winner of the Lou Marsh Award for 1980 as the nation's top athlete. He was named Canada's 1980 Newsmaker of the Year. The Ottawa Citizen described the national response to his marathon as "one of the most powerful outpourings of emotion and generosity in Canada's history".

== Illness and death ==
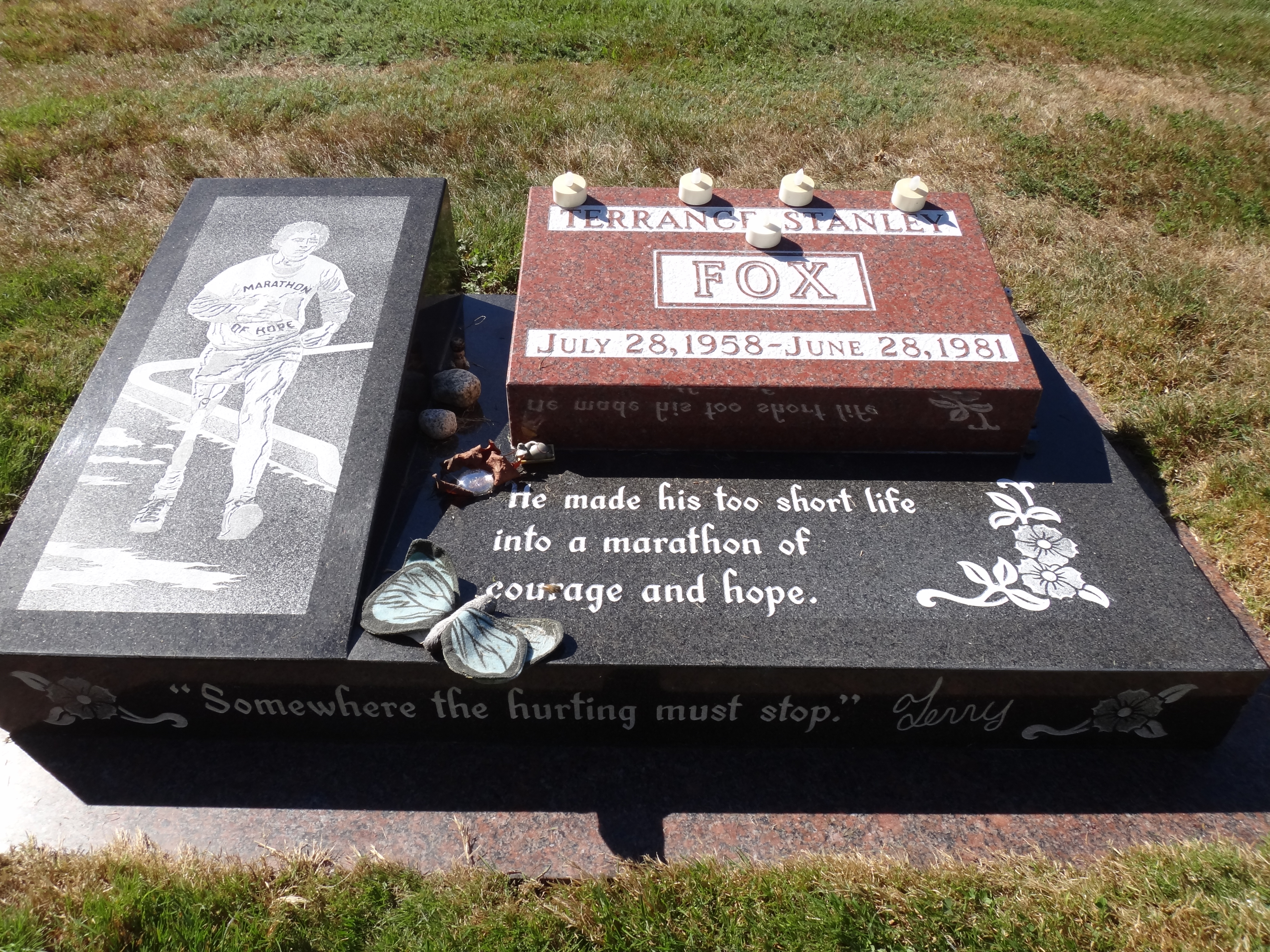
Terry Fox's grave in Port Coquitlam, Canada

In the following months, Fox received multiple chemotherapy treatments, but the disease continued to spread. As his condition worsened, Canadians hoped for a miracle and Pope John Paul II sent a telegram saying that he was praying for Fox. Doctors turned to experimental interferon treatments, though their effectiveness against osteogenic sarcoma was unknown. He had an adverse reaction to his first treatment, but continued the program after a period of rest.

Fox was re-admitted to the Royal Columbian Hospital in New Westminster on June 19, 1981, with chest congestion and developed pneumonia. He fell into a coma and died at 4:35 a.m. PDT on June 28, 1981. The Government of Canada ordered flags across the country lowered to half mast, an unprecedented honour that was usually reserved for statesmen. Addressing the House of Commons, Trudeau said, "It occurs very rarely in the life of a nation that the courageous spirit of one person unites all people in the celebration of his life and in the mourning of his death ... We do not think of him as one who was defeated by misfortune but as one who inspired us with the example of the triumph of the human spirit over adversity".

His funeral in Port Coquitlam was attended by 40 relatives and 200 guests, and broadcast on national television. Hundreds of communities across Canada also held memorial services, a public memorial service was held on Parliament Hill in Ottawa, and Canadians again overwhelmed Cancer Society offices with donations. Fox is buried at Port Coquitlam Municipal Cemetery.

== Legacy ==
External videos
- " Terry Fox" – Historica Canada - Heritage Minutes (1:00 min)
- SFU Clan Celebrating 50 Years: Marathon of Hope -Simon Fraser University (3:01 min)

Fox remains a prominent figure in Canadian folklore. His determination united the nation; people from all walks of life lent their support to his run and his memory inspires pride in all regions of the country. A 1999 national survey named him as Canada's greatest hero, and he finished second to Tommy Douglas in the 2004 Canadian Broadcasting Corporation program The Greatest Canadian. Fox's heroic status has been attributed to his image as an ordinary person attempting a remarkable and inspirational feat. Others have argued that Fox's greatness derives from his audacious vision, his determined pursuit of his goal, his ability to overcome challenges such as his lack of experience and the very loneliness of his venture. As Fox's advocate on The Greatest Canadian, media personality Sook-Yin Lee compared him to a classic hero, Phidippides, the runner who delivered the news of the Battle of Marathon before dying, and asserted that Fox "embodies the most cherished Canadian values: compassion, commitment, perseverance". She highlighted the juxtaposition between his celebrity, brought about by the unforgettable image he created, and his rejection of the trappings of that celebrity. Typically amongst Canadian icons, Fox is an unconventional hero, admired but not without flaws. An obituary in the Canadian Family Physician emphasized his humanity and noted that his anger – at his diagnosis, at press misrepresentations and at those he saw as encroaching on his independence – spoke against ascribing sainthood for Fox, and thus placed his achievements within the reach of all.

=== Views on Fox's disability ===
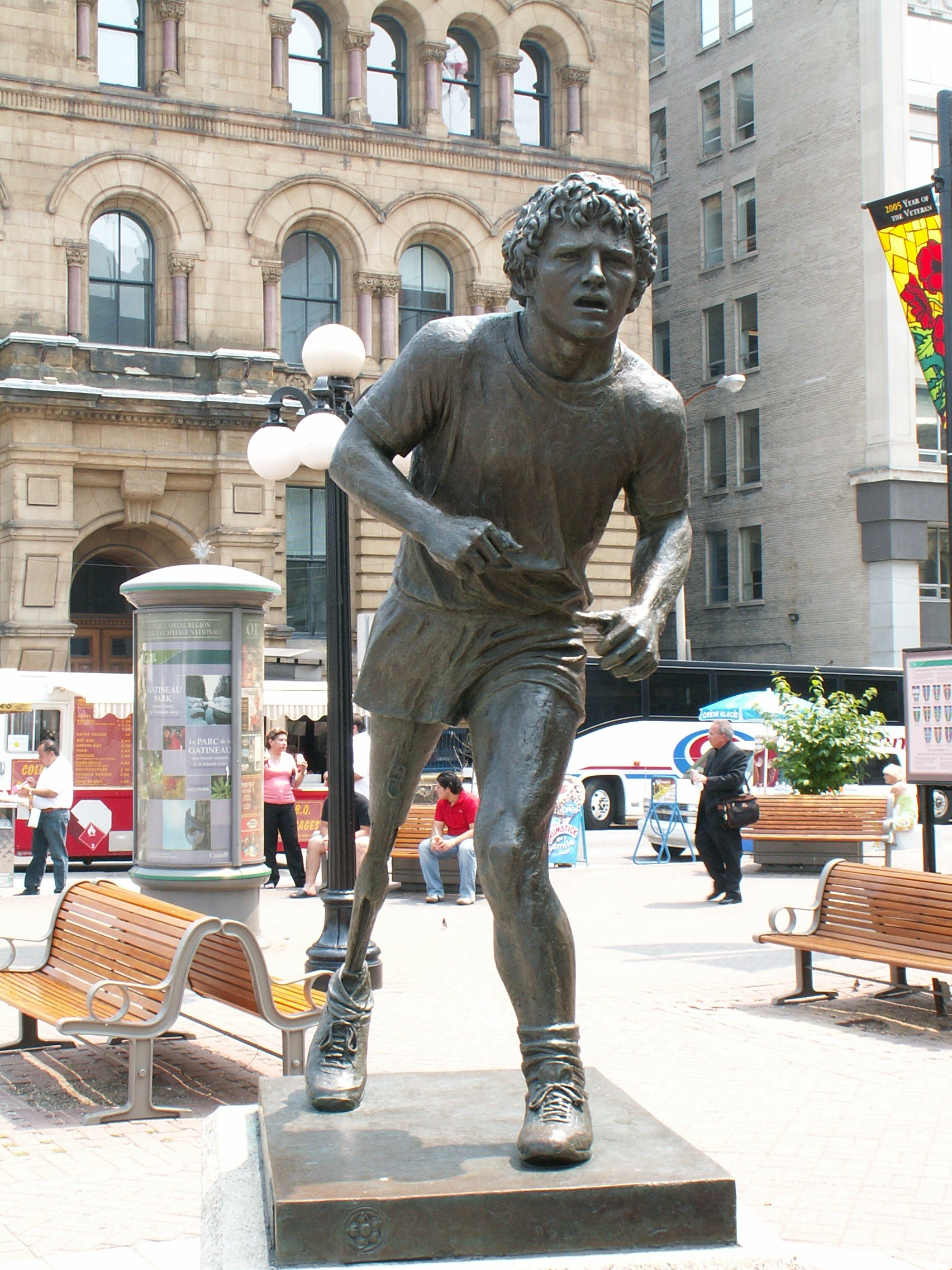
Terry Fox statue in Ottawa, Ontario

Fox refused to regard himself as disabled, and would not allow anyone to pity him, telling a Toronto radio station that he found life more "rewarding and challenging" since he had lost his leg. His feat helped redefine Canadian views of disability and the inclusion of disabled people in society. Fox's actions increased the visibility of people with disabilities, and influenced the attitudes of those with disabilities by showing disability portrayed in a positive light. Rick Hansen commented that the run challenged society to focus on ability rather than disability, writing, "What was perceived as a limitation became a great opportunity. People with disabilities started looking at things differently. They came away with huge pride".

The narrative surrounding Fox has been critiqued as illustrating the media's focus on stereotyped portrayals of the heroic and extraordinary achievements of people with disabilities, rather than more mundane accomplishments. Actor Alan Toy noted "Sure, it raised money for cancer research and sure it showed the human capacity for achievement. But a lot of disabled people are made to feel like failures if they haven't done something extraordinary. They may be bankers or factory workers – proof enough of their usefulness to society. Do we have to be 'supercrips' in order to be valid? And if we're not super, are we invalid?" The media's idealization of Fox has also been critiqued for emphasizing an individualistic approach to illness and disability, in which the body is a machine to be mastered, rather than the social model of disability where societal attitudes and barriers to inclusion play a prominent role in determining who is disabled.

=== Terry Fox Run ===
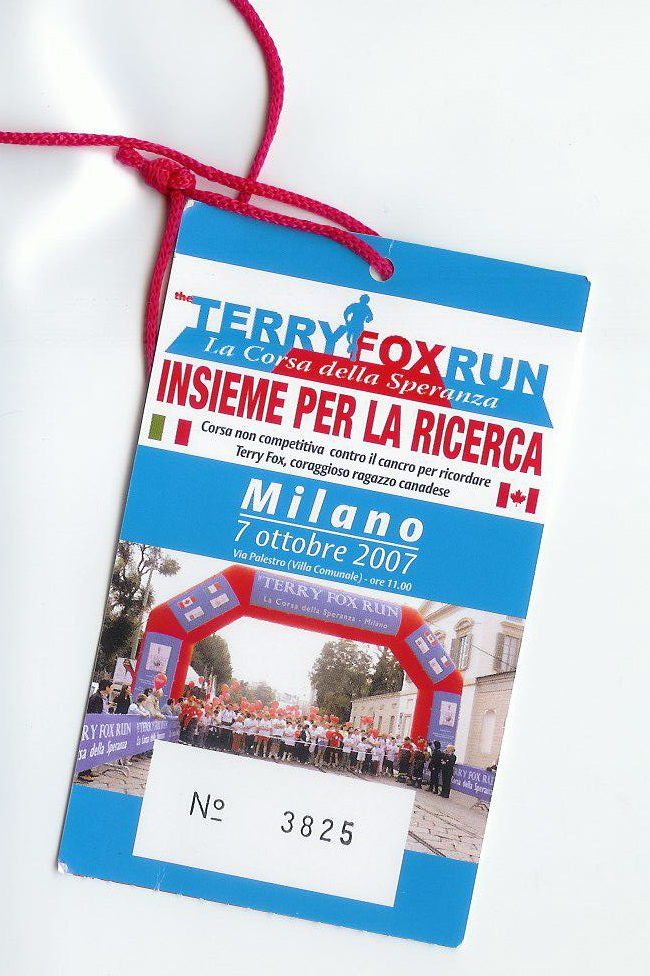
A runner's tag for a Terry Fox Run in Milan, Italy in 2007

During Fox's marathon, Sharp proposed an annual fundraising run in Fox's name; Fox agreed, but insisted that the runs be non-competitive and include any who wanted to participate. Sharp faced opposition to the project: the Cancer Society feared that a fall run would detract from its traditional April campaigns, while other charities believed that an additional fundraiser would leave less money for their causes. Sharp persisted, and he, the Four Seasons Hotels and the Fox family organized the first Terry Fox Run on September 13, 1981.

Over 300,000 people took part and raised $3.5 million in the first Terry Fox Run. Schools across Canada were urged to join the second run, held on September 19, 1982. School participation has continued since, evolving into the National School Run Day. The runs, which raised over $20 million in their first six years, grew into an international event as over one million people in 60 countries took part in 1999, raising $15 million that year alone. By the Terry Fox Run's 25th anniversary, more than three million people were taking part annually. Grants from the Terry Fox Foundation, which organizes the runs, have helped Canadian scientists make numerous advances in cancer research. The Terry Fox Run is the world's largest one-day fundraiser for cancer research, and over $850 million has been raised in his name as of May 2022.

=== Honours ===
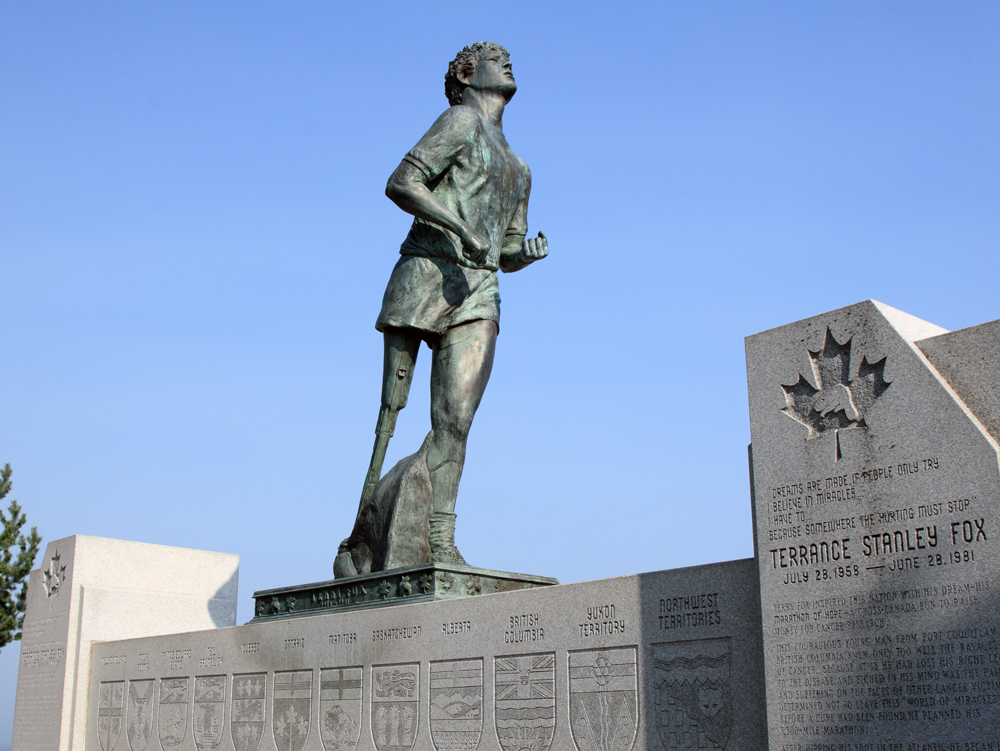
Memorial erected outside Thunder Bay on the Trans-Canada Highway near the spot where Fox was forced to end his marathon.

The physical memorials in Canada named after Fox include:

- Approximately 32 roads and streets, notably Terry Fox Drive, Ottawa, and the Terry Fox Courage Highway near Thunder Bay, near where Fox ended his run and where a statue of him was erected as a monument the Terry Fox Memorial and Lookout;
- 14 schools, including a new school in a suburb of Montreal that was renamed Terry Fox Elementary School shortly after he died, and the Port Coquitlam high school from which he had graduated, which was renamed Terry Fox Secondary School on January 18, 1986;

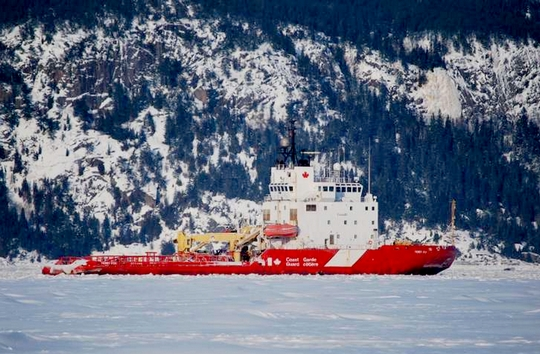
CCGS Terry Fox, in winter 2009 on the Saguenay River

- 14 other buildings, including many athletic centres, and
  - Terry Fox Stadium, Ottawa, Ontario
  - Terry Fox Station, a transitway stop in Ottawa
  - Terry Fox Theatre, Port Coquitlam, British Columbia
  - the Terry Fox Research Institute and the Terry Fox Laboratory, the major research unit of the British Columbia Cancer Agency;
- Seven statues, including:
  - the Terry Fox Monument in Ottawa, which was the genesis of The Path of Heroes, a federal government initiative that seeks to honour the people that shaped the nation;
  - In 2011, a series of four bronze sculptures of Fox, designed by Douglas Coupland and depicting Fox running toward the Pacific Ocean, was unveiled at Terry Fox Plaza outside BC Place in downtown Vancouver.
- Nine fitness trails;
- A previously unnamed mountain in the Canadian Rockies in the Selwyn range, which was named Mount Terry Fox by the government of British Columbia; the area around it is now known as Mount Terry Fox Provincial Park;
- The Terry Fox Fountain of Hope was installed in 1982 on the grounds of Rideau Hall;
- The Canadian Coast Guard icebreaker CCGS Terry Fox, which was commissioned in 1983.

Shortly after his death, Fox was named the Newsmaker of the Year for 1981, and Canada Post announced the production of a commemorative stamp in 1981, bypassing its traditionally held position that stamps honouring people should not be created until ten years after their deaths. British rock star Rod Stewart was so moved by the Marathon of Hope that he was inspired to write and dedicate the song "Never Give Up on a Dream" – found on his 1981 album Tonight I'm Yours – to Fox. Stewart also called his 1981–1982 tour of Canada the "Terry Fox Tour". In 1982 the groundwork was laid for the Terry Fox Canadian Youth Centre, a residential hostel in Ottawa for high school students to come from across Canada to spend a week learning about the country. It was set up by the Canadian Unity Council; the programme later became known as Encounters with Canada and the building was renamed the Historica Canada Centre.

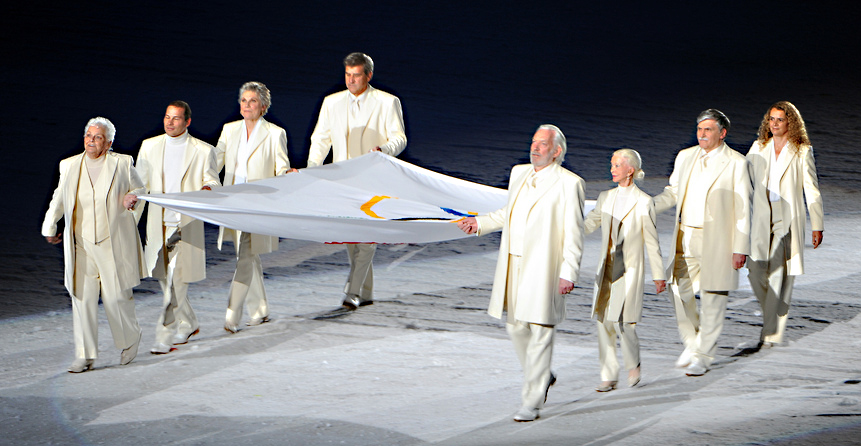
Betty Fox (far left, front) carries the Olympic flag into the 2010 Winter Olympics opening ceremony in Vancouver.

In 2012, Fox was posthumously inducted into the Canadian Medical Hall of Fame in the Builder category in recognition of his public service in the name of research fundraising.

The Terry Fox Hall of Fame was established in 1994 to recognize individuals that have made contributions that improved the quality of life of disabled people.

In 2005, the Royal Canadian Mint issued a special dollar coin designed by Stanley Witten to commemorate the 25th anniversary of the Marathon of Hope. It was their first regular circulation coin to feature a Canadian.

In 2008, Fox was named a National Historic Person of Canada, a recognition given by the Canadian government to those persons who are considered to have played a nationally significant role in the history of the country. Fox's designation was due to his status as an "enduring icon", his personal qualities, and for the manner in which the Marathon of Hope had captivated the country and resonated deeply with Canadians.

Fox's mother, Betty Fox, was one of eight people to carry the Olympic Flag into BC Place Stadium at the opening ceremonies of the 2010 Winter Olympics in Vancouver. The games saw the Terry Fox Award bestowed on Olympic athletes who embodied Fox's characteristics of determination and humility in the face of adversity.

Beginning in 2015, Manitoba designated the first Monday in August, formerly known as Civic Holiday, as Terry Fox Day.

On September 13, 2020, Google celebrated Fox with a Google Doodle.

=== Film and stage ===
Fox's story was dramatized in the 1983 biographical film The Terry Fox Story. Produced by Home Box Office, the film aired as a television movie in the United States and had a theatrical run in Canada. The film starred amputee actor Eric Fryer and Robert Duvall, and was the first film made exclusively for pay television. The movie received mixed but generally positive reviews, but was criticized by Fox's family over how it portrayed his temper. The Terry Fox Story was nominated for eight Genie Awards, and won five, including Best Picture and Best Actor.

Rock musician Ian Thomas had written and recorded a song in response to Fox's story, "Runner", which ended up being included in the film. It also was covered by Manfred Mann's Earth Band, reaching #22 on the Billboard Hot 100 and #34 in Canada in 1984.

A second movie, titled Terry, focused on the Marathon of Hope, was produced by the CTV Television Network in 2005. Fox was portrayed by Shawn Ashmore. He is not an amputee; digital editing was used to superimpose a prosthesis over his real leg. The film was endorsed by Fox's family, and portrayed his attitude more positively than the first movie. Canadian National Basketball Association star Steve Nash, who himself was inspired by Fox when he was a child, directed a 2010 documentary Into the Wind, which aired on ESPN as part of its 30 for 30 series.

Run Terry Run, a documentary film by Sean Menard compiled from largely-unseen footage shot by John Simpson during the original Marathon of Hope, premiered at Roy Thomson Hall in 2025, before receiving a gala screening at the 2026 Toronto International Film Festival.

=== Steve Fonyo and Rick Hansen ===
Fox was not the first person to attempt to run across Canada. Mark Kent crossed the country in 1974 as he raised money for the Canadian team at the 1976 Summer Olympics. While he lived, Fox refused to let anyone else complete the Marathon of Hope, having promised to finish it himself once he recovered. Steve Fonyo, an 18-year-old with the same form of cancer and who also had a leg amputated, sought in 1984 to duplicate Fox's run, calling his effort the "Journey for Lives". After leaving St. John's on March 31, Fonyo reached the point where Fox was forced to end his marathon at the end of November, and completed the transcontinental run on May 29, 1985. The Journey for Lives raised over $13 million for cancer research.

Canadian Paralympic athlete Rick Hansen, who had recruited Fox to play on his wheelchair basketball team in 1977, was similarly inspired by the Marathon of Hope. Hansen, who first considered circumnavigating the globe in his wheelchair in 1974, began the Man in Motion World Tour in 1985 with the goal of raising $10 million towards research into spinal cord injuries. As Fonyo had, Hansen paused at the spot Fox's run ended to honour the late runner. Hansen completed his world tour in May 1987 after 792 days and 40,073 kilometres (24,900 mi); he travelled through 34 countries and raised over $26 million.

=== Government documents ===
Fox is shown in the 2013 rendering of the Canadian passport. In December 2024, Fox was chosen to appear on a future issue of the Canadian $5 bill.

== See also ==
- Riley Senft – Canadian humanitarian, prostate cancer activist, and ultramarathon athlete
- Terry – Book by Douglas Coupland
