= Terry Fox Run =

Annual charity event for cancer research

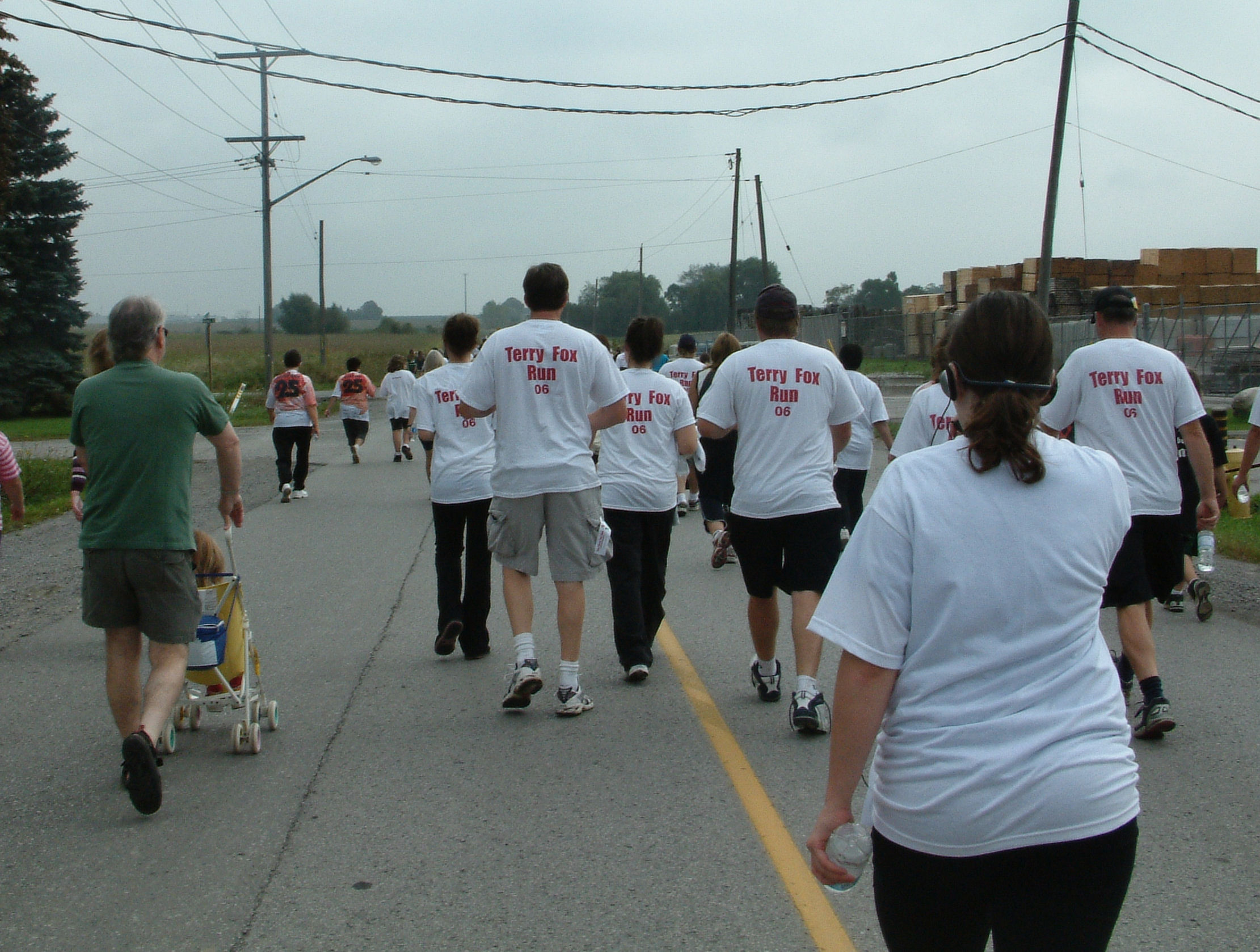
- 2006 Terry Fox Run in Bowmanville, Ontario, Canada
- Status: Active
- Genre: Cancer fundraiser
- Frequency: Annually, second Sunday after Labour Day
- Years active: 45 years
- Inaugurated: 13 September 1981; 45 years ago
- Founder: Isadore Sharp, technically Terry Fox
- Next event: 19 September 2027
- Website: www.terryfox.org

The Terry Fox Run is an annual non-competitive charity event held around the world to raise money for cancer research in commemoration of Canadian cancer activist Terry Fox and his Marathon of Hope.

The event was founded in 1981 by Isadore Sharp, who had contacted Fox in hospital by telegram and expressed his wishes to hold an annual run in Fox's name to raise funds for cancer research. Sharp had lost his son to cancer in 1979. The event is held every year on the second Sunday following Labour Day. Since its inception, it has raised via the Terry Fox Foundation over $1 billion (CAD). The run is informal which means that the distance often varies, usually between 5–15 km (3.1–9.3 mi); participation is considered to be more important than completing the set distance. There are also runs at schools of every level throughout Canada, often with shorter distances than the community runs.

The Terry Fox Run has no corporate sponsorship, in accordance with Terry Fox's original wishes of not seeking fame or fortune from his endeavour. During his cross-Canada run, he rejected every endorsement he was offered, as he felt that it would detract from his goal of creating public awareness. The Terry Fox Runs have no advertisements on any race related materials (such as T-shirts, banners, etc.), and the Terry Fox Foundation's policies are explicitly against profiting from association with the charity goal of the run, though not-for-profit support is welcomed.

== History ==
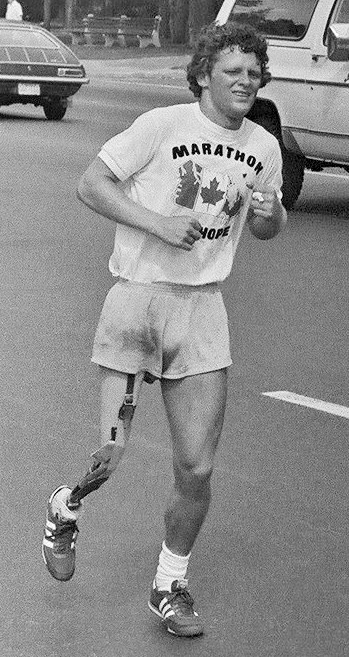
Terry Fox

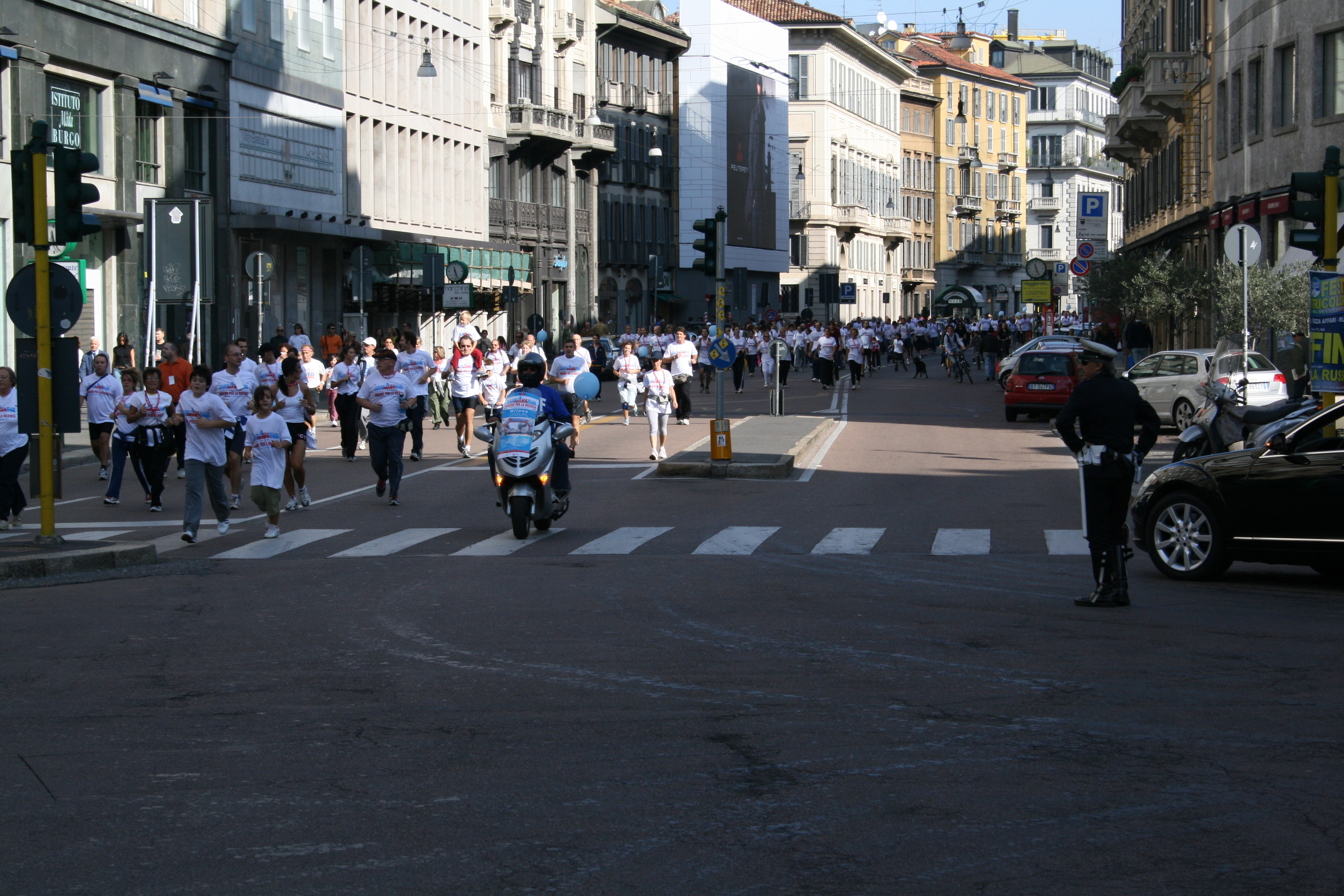
The Terry Fox Run in Milan, Italy, in 2007

The Terry Fox Foundation was founded in 1988 after it separated from the Canadian Cancer Society. Since its inception, the Terry Fox Foundation has raised over $950 million for cancer research. Currently, Terry Fox Runs take place every year with many participants from all over the world. The Run is a volunteer led, all-inclusive, non-competitive event with no corporate sponsorship, incentives or fundraising minimums. Fox laid out these wishes before his death in 1981.

In 2007, the Terry Fox Foundation created the Terry Fox Research Institute to conduct transnational research to significantly improve outcomes for cancer patients. In the fiscal year, ending on March 31, 2013, the Terry Fox Foundation directed $27.7 million to its cancer research programs.

The Terry Fox Foundation has expanded beyond the traditional Run as well, by holding various other events. These events include National School Run Day, where schools throughout Canada hold a Run to commemorate Fox and raise funds, and the Great Canadian Hair "Do", which is a fundraising event that can take place at any time of the year. Participants are able to make the event as creative as they want— shave their heads, dye their hair a wacky colour, include a manly leg wax, and recruit friends to shave their heads as well.

In October 2026, the Terry Fox Foundation received $25 million from the Larry and Judy Tanenbaum Family Foundation. It is the biggest single donation for the Terry Fox Foundation.

== Debuts by country ==
=== The Americas ===
- Canada – September 13, 1981, at 760 sites
- Cuba – 1998. In 2005, over 1.9 million people used 3,600 sites. In 2006, it had around 2.6 million participants. The tenth run in 2007 had 4,652 sites and 2.267 million runners.
- United States – 1990 in Bangor, Maine
- Venezuela – 1998 at the Colegio Internacional de Caracas

=== Europe ===
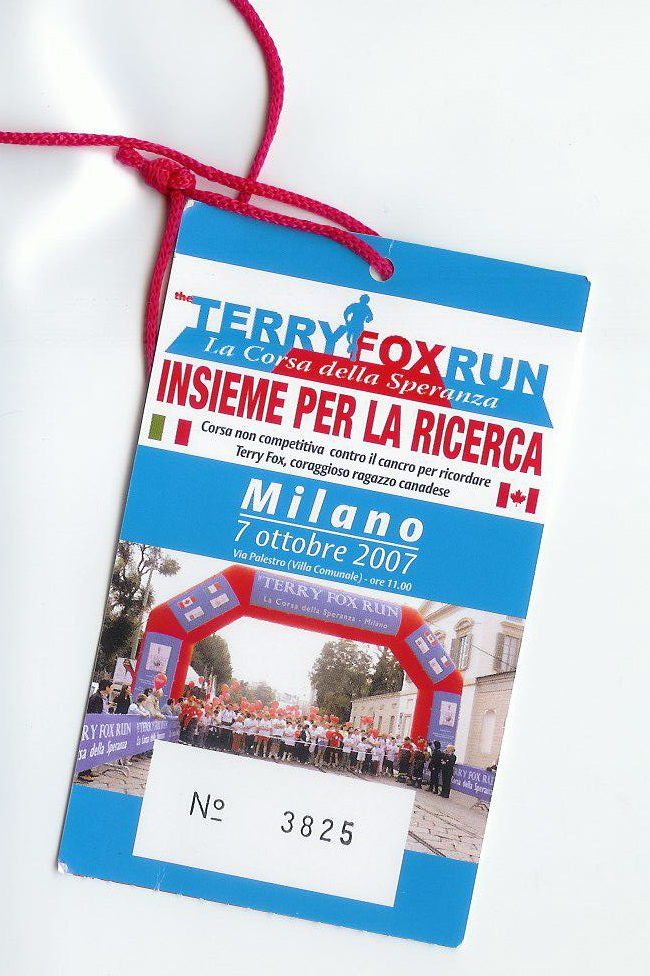
A runner's tag for a Terry Fox Run in Milan, Italy, in 2007

- Bulgaria – 2013 and 2017 at the Anglo-American School of Sofia
- Croatia – 2000
- Hungary – 1999, ended in 2005
- Poland – 2006
- Portugal – 1994
- Spain – 2017

=== Asia-Pacific ===
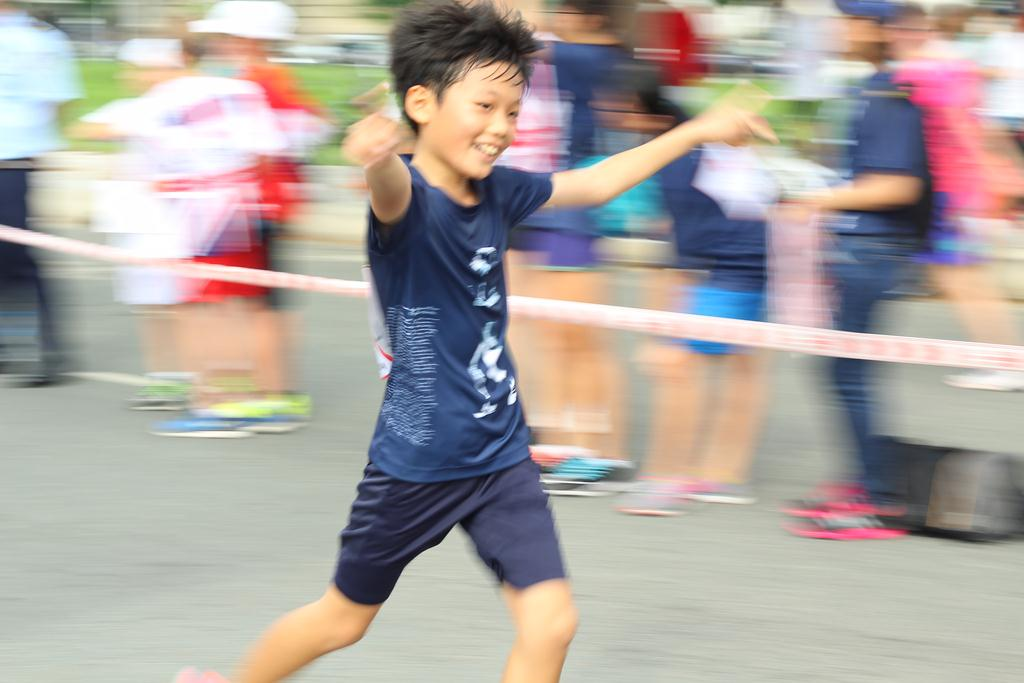
A moment at the TFR 2014 in Ho Chi Minh City, Vietnam (2014)

- Australia – September 1988 in Brisbane (legacy from Expo '88) raising $22,000 AUD
- China – 1998
- Hong Kong – 2013
- Malaysia – Early 1990s in Kuala Lumpur
- New Zealand – 2023 in both Auckland and Christchurch
- Oman – 2008
- Philippines – 2001 in Cebu City
- Syria – 1991, ended after 2010 due to the civil war
- Taiwan – 2001 in Taipei City
- Thailand – 1995 in Bangkok
- Vietnam – 1996 in Ho Chi Minh City. In 2014, it drew about 16,500 participants and the organization committee included the Canadian Chamber of Commerce in Vietnam.

== See also ==
- List of monuments and memorials to Terry Fox
- Pan-Mass Challenge, the largest charity athletic event in the USA to fund cancer research
- Relay for Life
- The Ride to Conquer Cancer
