= Mount Terry Fox =

Mountain in British Columbia, Canada

- Location within British Columbia

Highest point
- Elevation: 2,645 m (8,678 ft)
- Prominence: 503 m (1,650 ft)
- Listing: Mountains of British Columbia
- Coordinates: 52°55′58″N 119°14′08″W

Naming
- Etymology: Terry Fox

Geography
- Country: Canada
- Province: British Columbia
- District: Cariboo Land District
- Protected area: Mount Terry Fox Provincial Park
- Parent range: Selwyn Range
- Topo map: NTS 83D14 Valemount

Mount Terry Fox is a peak in the Selwyn Range of the Canadian Rockies in British Columbia, Canada. In 1981, the previously unnamed mountain was named in honour of Terry Fox. It is 10.5 kilometres (6.5 mi) north of Valemount, British Columbia and 21 kilometres (13 mi) southwest of Mount Robson, and is within Mount Terry Fox Provincial Park.
