= JPod (disambiguation) =

jPod is a 2006 novel by Douglas Coupland.

JPod may also refer to:

- jPod (TV series), a 2008 television comedy series based on the novel
- John Podhoretz (born 1961), American writer
- James Podsiadly (born 1981), Australian rules footballer
- J Pod, a community of southern resident killer whales in the northeastern Pacific Ocean
