= Benjamin Ayres =

Canadian actor (born 1977)

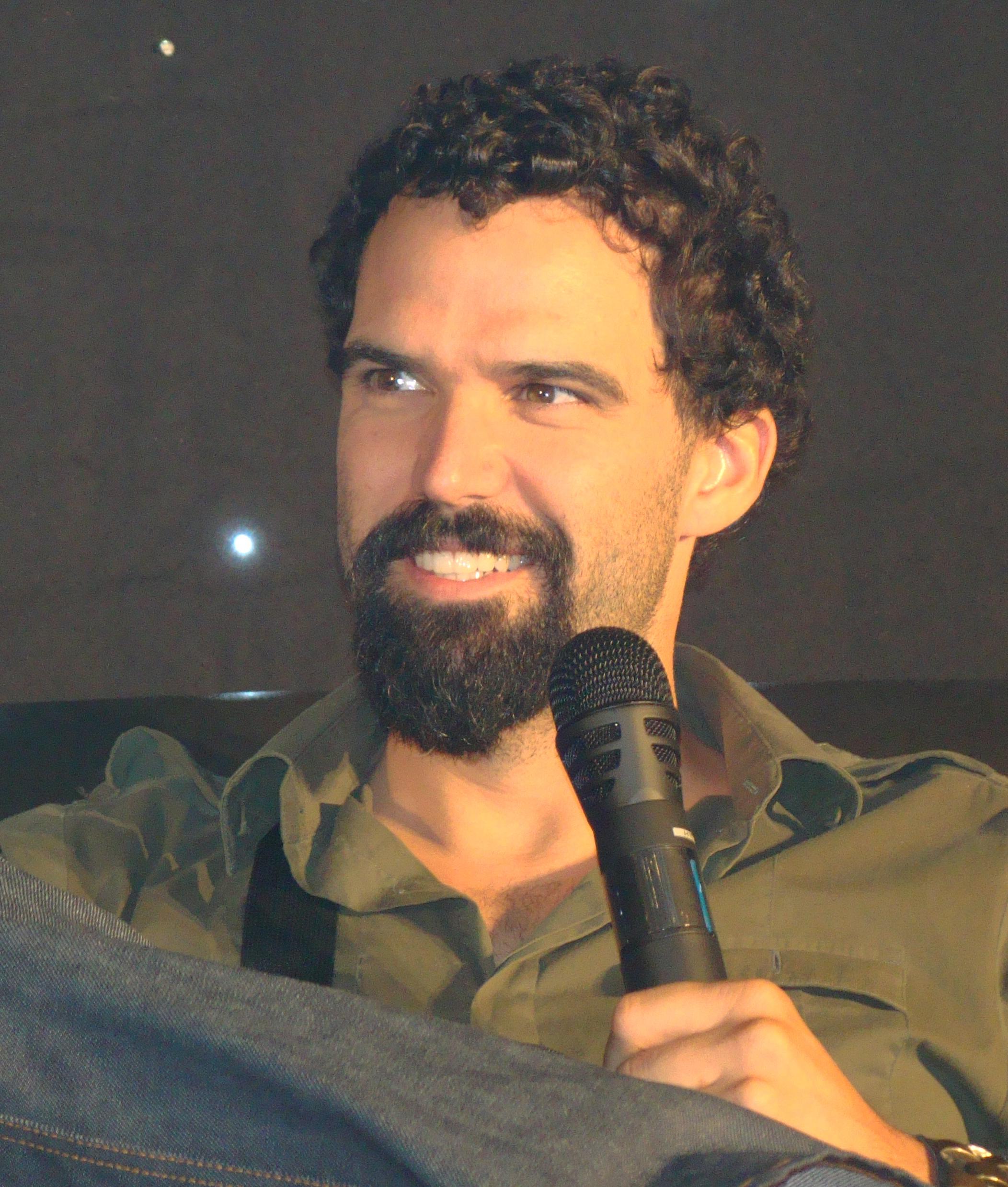
- Ayres in September 2010
- Born: January 19, 1977 (age 49); Kamloops, British Columbia, Canada
- Occupation: Actor Writer
- Years active: 2002–present
- Known for: Saving Hope jPod
- Spouse: Erin Ayres
- Children: 2
- Relatives: Boris Karloff
- Website: https://www.benjaminjamesayres.com/

Benjamin James Ayres (born January 19, 1977) is a Canadian actor best known for his role as Dr. Zach Miller of the CTV series Saving Hope. He also recurred on the Gemini Award–winning HBO Canada series Less Than Kind for which he was nominated for a Canadian Screen Award. His first series regular role was Casper Jesperson (a.k.a. "Cancer Cowboy"), the chain-smoking sex addict who is morbidly obsessed with death, in the critically acclaimed cult hit CBC Television series jPod, based on the Douglas Coupland novel of the same title.

He is a distant relative of character actor Boris Karloff.

== Filmography ==
=== Film ===
Year	Title	Role	Notes
2002	Summer	Jake	
2003	Quietanzato	Tony	Short film
2004	Spare Change	Miles	Short film
2004	Desolation: A Comedy	Fred the Cop	
2005	Crazy Late	Travis	Short film
2007	Numb	Brad	
2007	Fantastic Four: Rise of the Silver Surfer	Guard #1	
2007	Good Luck Chuck	Groomsman	
2009	A Gun to the Head	Dwayne	
2009	Good Image Media	Ron Miner	Short film
2009	Scott's Land	Helix	Short film
2010	Lullaby for Pi	Sonny	
2012	Dead Before Dawn	Griffith Galloway	
2012	Charlie	Officer Benson	
2013	Cottage Country	Dov Rosenberg	
2013	The Golden Ticket	Dooley	Short film
2014	Death Do Us Part	Derrick Harris	
2014	What an Idiot	Zane	
2015	American Riot	Warden Montgomery	Short film
2016	A Sunday Kind of Love	Mark	
2016	Unless	Arthur Springer	
2018	Birdland	Calvin	
2019	Canadian Strain	Luke	
2019	Lie Exposed	Gregg	
2022	Don't Hang Up	Officer Halton	

=== Television ===
Year	Title	Role	Notes
2002	Jeremiah	Guard	Episode: "And the Ground, Sown with Salt"
2003	Stargate SG-1	Muirios	Episode: "Space Race"
2004	The Collector	The Devil / Pool Hustler	Episode: "The Actuary"
2004	Da Vinci's Inquest	Bartender	Episode: "First the Seducing Then the Screwing"
2005	Survivors	Eric LeMarque	Miniseries; episode: "Dead Man Boarding"
2005	Battlestar Galactica	Lt. George 'Catman' Birch	Episode: "Home: Part 1"
2005	Supernatural	Homeland Security Man #1	Episode: "Phantom Traveler"
2005	Reunion	Nate	Episode: "1989"
2005	Chasing Christmas	Mike	TV movie
2006	Killer Instinct	Ty Graham	Episode: "She's the Bomb"
2006	Eight Days to Live	Reporter	TV movie
2006	Whistler	Joe	Episode: "Out of the Shadows"
2006	My Silent Partner	Arthur Bannister	TV movie
2006	Sketch with Kevin McDonald	Various Characters	TV movie
2007	The L Word	Lorenzo	Episode: "Long Time Coming"
2007	Holiday in Handcuffs	Nick	TV movie
2007	Blue Smoke	Hugh	TV movie
2007	Termination Point	Officer Dunbar	TV movie
2007	Smallville	Jason Bartlett	5 episodes
2007	Betrayals	Javier Sarmiento	TV movie
2008	jPod	Casper Jasperson (Cancer Cowboy)	13 episodes
2008	Psych	Howie Tolkin	Episode: "Murder?... Anyone?... Anyone?... Bueller?"
2009	Impact	Bob Pierce	2 episodes
2009	Diamonds	Steve Dyson	Miniseries
2009	The Vampire Diaries	Mr. William Tanner	Episodes: "Pilot", "The Night of the Comet" & "Friday Night Bites"
2009	Mistresses	Carter Blackwell	TV movie
2010–2011	Dan for Mayor	Mike Norman	26 episodes
2010–2013	Less Than Kind	Eric Blake	12 episodes
2011	Combat Hospital	Lt. Christian Bettany	Episode: "Wrong Place at the Right Time"
2011	Reel Love	Bobby Calgrove	TV movie
2011	InSecurity	Cal Thompson	Episode: "Agent Ex"
2011	Flashpoint	Decklan Pownell	Episode: "Day Game"
2011	12 Dates of Christmas	Jack Evans	TV movie
2012–2017	Saving Hope	Dr. Zach Miller	83 episodes
2013	Lost Girl	Endymion / Eddy	Episode: "Sleeping Beauty School"
2013	His Turn	Buck Bolan	TV movie
2014	Working the Engels	Dennis Karinsky	Episode: "Picture Night"
2014	Seed	Frank Dacosta	Episode: "Et Tattoo Bruté?"
2014	Rookie Blue	Geno Jones	Episode: "Heart Breakers, Money Makers"
2014–2016	Bitten	Jorge Sorrentino	3 episodes
2015	Schitt's Creek	Grant	Episode: "Little Sister"
2015	Vox	Cal Hollister	TV movie
2016	Love By Chance	Dr. Eric Carlton	TV movie
2017	Falling for Vermont	Dr. Jeff Callan	TV movie
2017	Emma Fielding Mysteries	Will	TV movie
2017	Yellow	Husband	TV movie
2018	Frankie Drake Mysteries	Ben Sellers	Episode: "Now You See Her"
2018–2019	Suits	Gavin Andrews	5 episodes
2018–2020	Burden of Truth	Alan Christie	9 episodes
2019	Baroness von Sketch Show	Graham / Mr. Rothersby	2 episodes
2019	A Blue Ridge Mountain Christmas	David Lyndon	TV movie
2019	Best Intentions	Jack Mayhan	TV movie
2019–2021	Chronicle Mysteries	Drew Godfrey	5 episodes
2019–2022	Detention Adventure	Bruno Black	9 episodes
2020	Cranberry Christmas	Gabe	TV movie
2020	Private Eyes	Professor Dan Bryan	Episode: "Tappa Kegga Daily"
2021	The Good Doctor	Whyatt	Episode: "The Uncertainty Principle"
2021	You, Me & the Christmas Trees	Jack	TV movie
2021	Chronicle Mysteries: Helped to Death	Drew Godfrey	Hallmark Movie
2022	The Kids in the Hall	Blank Face	Episode #1.6
2022	Color My World with Love	Nic	TV movie
2022	The Bad Seed Returns	Robert Costa	TV movie
2022	Long Lost Christmas	Blake	TV movie
2023	Field Day	Dan Aldridge	TV movie
2023	Our Christmas Mural	Hayden	TV movie (uncredited)
2023	Miracle in Bethlehem, PA.	Joe	TV movie
2024	True Justice	D.A. Quinn	TV movie
2024	Paging Mr. Darcy	Golfer Bro	TV movie
2024	Love & Jane	Trevor Fitzsimmons	TV movie
2024	Family Law	Ben Cohen	6 episodes
2024	Santa Tell Me	Nick A	TV Movie
2024	Happy Holidays From Cherry Lane	Eli	TV Movie
2024	The Santa Class	Dan	TV Movie
2025	Mistletoe Murders	Handsome Janitor Hollis	Episode "Cold War"

== Nominations ==
Year	Award	Category	Film/Series
2008	Leo Awards	Best Supporting Performance by a Male in a Dramatic Series	jPod
2010	Gemini Award	Best Comedy Program or Series	Dan for Mayor
2011	Canadian Comedy Awards	Best Performance By an Ensemble—Television	Dan for Mayor
2012	Leo Awards	Best Performance by a Male in a Comedy Series	Less Than Kind
2013	Canadian Screen Awards	Best Performance by a Male in a Comedy Series	Less Than Kind
