= List of jPod episodes =

The following is a list of jPod episodes, a comedic CBC Canadian show. The series is based on Douglas Coupland's best-selling novel. It premiered on January 8, 2008, in its regular time slot of 9:00 P.M.

== Episodes ==
=== Season 1 ===
No.	Title	Original release date	Prod. code
1	"I Love Turtles"	January 8, 2008	101
Ethan Jarlewski and his four co-workers at Neotronic Arts are introduced to their new and awkward boss, Steve Lefkowitz, who decides that the Skateboarding game they are developing needs a turtle character much to the disapproval of the podsters. Ethan's mother accidentally kills a man named Tim in her basement and gets her son to help hide the body, while his father begins an affair with a much younger girl from Ethan's high school.
2	"A Fine Bro-mance"	January 15, 2008	102
Ethan gets mixed up with Kam Fong, a Chinese smuggler, when his brother Greg uses his apartment as a storage for illegal immigrants which Ethan has to take care of. Carol and Jim find good uses for the immigrants such as fixing Jim's costume and helping Carol packaging her marijuana crop. Jim auditions for a big part in a movie but fails because he doesn't have a German accent. Carol is harassed by Dwight, the friend of Tim who tells her to deliver the newly packaged crop to him. When Carol does, Dwight starts to choke her but is saved by Steve only to let his car ram straight in to Dwight (presumably killing him) after disposing the body, Steve was briefly traumatized by the event but his spirits are lifted by Carol. Later, Steve names the turtle character Dwight. Bree Jyang is offered a job as assistant to the vice president of the UK Neotronic Arts office but declines. Kaitlin Joyce starts attending a night school so she can finish high school with Cowboy giving moral support. Later in the episode, Ethan begins his encounter with Kam Fong. Kam Fong goes to a ballroom and finds Jim. The two later become friends, much to Carol's dismay
3	"Emo-tion Capture"	January 22, 2008	103
A competition between Ethan and Kaitlin for a pair of Nikumas heats up when Kam Fong blackmails Ethan. Cowboy tutors John Doe in the ways of the player, and his latest conquest has a family connection. Frightened of Ellen's devotion to him, Jim asks Kam Fong for a favour. After a night out with Carol as thanks for judging the competition, Steve is arrested for using his PDA while driving.
4	"Feed the Need"	January 29, 2008	104
While at a local fast food restaurant, the podsters encounter Katlin's ex boyfriend, Kevin, who is now working there as a clown after his TV show fizzled out. John Doe and his mother have an argument after he steals a lasagna made from placenta. The podsters, minus Kaitlin, work on a cola beverage, jCola, to debut at a BoardX production update.
5	"Crappy Birthday to You"	February 8, 2008	105
It's Bree's 29th birthday and the Podsters minus Kaitlin design an e-card for her. Bree enjoys the e-card very much but Kaitlin brings a better surprise, helium. Ethan warns her about bringing helium into Jpod but Kaitlin still does the surprise which nobody found funny. Ethan explained to her that Evil Mark brought helium in the Jpod as well, killing him leaving a frustrated Kaitlin to leave. Meanwhile, Jim wants to get on White Ghost, a Hong Kong TV show that airs videos of North Americans doing stupid stuff and borrows Carol's father's stun gun to stun himself. Jim and Kam Fong throw a karaoke party at Ethan's apartment. Ethan finds out and wants everyone to leave. Instead, Ethan gets drunk and sings Air Supply's "All out of Love" in front of a video camera and the video was sent to AllTube (a parody of YouTube) which was viewed by everyone at Neotronic, much to Ethan's horror. At Jpod, Steve wants to add the Happy Birthday song to the video game since Conner's birthday is coming up and he wants it to be a surprise. But it is hard to add it due to copyright issues. When all the podsters except Ethan had a meeting with the copyright person, she does not cooperate by insulting everyone. Kaitlin and the rest of the podsters take her back to the Jpod where they demand her to apologize but the copyright person keeps refusing until Ethan forces her to apologize by saying that they will put an embarrassing video of her online. The copyright person finally concedes and signs a contract provided by Ethan. After she throws the pen but it hits Ethan's mouse thus, sending the video to Alltube. The copyright person leaves angry and embarrassed. That night the Jarlewskis and Kam Fong went to Ethan's apartment to watch White Ghost to see if he won but the outcome results in the copyright person's video winning instead, disappointing Kam Fong. Carol walks away and finds Steve in his apartment and is stunned to see Steve cleaning a mural with her on it. The episode ends with Kaitlin watching Ethan's video.
6	"The Hero's Journey"	February 15, 2008	106
Just as Ethan musters up the nerve to ask Kaitlin out, her old flame Kevin becomes a hero. Jim is delighted to have an opportunity to do research for an upcoming bikesploitation movie when he and Carol visit a biker's house in hopes of expanding her marijuana market. Cowboy helps a former Neotronic employee who ended up in Guantanamo Bay after 9/11 update his code.
7	"Sprite Quest"	February 22, 2008	107
After Steve goes missing, the Podsters get a new boss in Alistair Parrish, the former Guantanamo prisoner who stole Cowboy's code. Carol becomes depressed after Steve's disappearance, so Jim attempts to cheer her up, and they mistakenly end up at a swinger's convention.
8	"The Last Shot"	February 29, 2008	108
Ethan passes out invitations to the Jarlewski Annual Chuckshot, a celebration in honour of his late maternal grandfather. Part of the family tradition is that an animal, shot in the wild, provides the meat for the event. The biker Carol accidentally shot is out for revenge. Kaitlin's boyfriend, Kevin, the disgraced spokesclown, crashes the party.
9	"Fine China"	March 7, 2008	109
Ethan and Cowboy are detained when they arrive in Beijing - they had no idea their luggage contains 50 bags of heroin. Carol agrees to let Kam Fong shoot an adult film in her home.
10	"The Betty and Veronica Syndrome"	March 14, 2008	110
The Podsters have their first meeting with the new heroin-addicted Steve - they aren't impressed. Bree asks Cowboy for a favour. Will Ethan be able to decide between two women who are friends?
11	"Senseless Prom Death"	March 21, 2008	111
The Podsters decide to throw Kaitlin a prom. Cowboy notices things are missing from his desk. Jim takes up screenwriting, determined to write his way to fame. Carol leaves.
12	"Steve Leaves"	March 28, 2008	112
Jim finds Steve's dead body in the driveway. At freedom's lesbian commune, Carol gets a "makeunder". Bree joins John Doe on his quest to rescue Carol from being converted by freedom.
13	"Colony Collapse Disorder"	April 4, 2008	113
A power surge creates a mainframe glitch and, just as it was created, jPod is going to be disbanded.
