= The Night of the Comet =

- The Vampire Diaries episode
- Episode no.: Season 1 Episode 2
- Directed by: Marcos Siega
- Written by: Kevin Williamson; Julie Plec
- Cinematography by: Paul M. Sommers
- Editing by: Joshua Butler
- Production code: 2J5001
- Original air date: September 17, 2009

Guest appearances
- Chris William Martin as Zach Salvatore; Benjamin Ayres as William Tanner

Episode chronology
← Previous "Pilot"	Next → "Friday Night Bites"
- The Vampire Diaries season 1

"The Night of the Comet" is the second episode of the first season of the American supernatural teen drama television series The Vampire Diaries. It aired on The CW on September 17, 2009. The episode was written by series developers Kevin Williamson and Julie Plec, and directed by supervising producer Marcos Siega.

== Plot ==
Jeremy (Steven R. McQueen) visits Vicki (Kayla Ewell), who is still hospitalized after being attacked by Damon (Ian Somerhalder). She rebuffs him due to her feelings for Tyler (Michael Trevino), who has started showing more interest in her. Jenna (Sara Canning) meets with Jeremy's teacher Mr. Tanner (Benjamin Ayres), where she learns that he is missing classes due to his drug and alcohol abuse. Jenna tries to convince him to improve his behavior, but fails.

Matt (Zach Roerig) tells Elena (Nina Dobrev) that Vicki claims to have been attacked by a vampire, but he does not believe her. Stefan (Paul Wesley) overhears and worries that Vicki will expose Damon and him. He goes to the hospital and psychically compels her to remember it as an animal attack. Vicki continues to have nightmares where she sees Damon's face.

Caroline (Candice Accola) tells Bonnie (Kat Graham) that she recently met a mysterious guy who turns out to be Damon. When Elena joins them, Caroline convinces her to give Stefan a chance. Elena goes to the Salvatore house and meets Damon, who tells her about Stefan's former lover, Katherine. Stefan arrives and tells Elena to leave.

That night, Mystic Falls residents are out to watch a comet pass over the town, and Elena and Stefan meet up. She expresses discomfort that he had not discussed Damon or Katherine with her, and he apologizes. Meanwhile, Vicki is discharged from the hospital and encounters Damon, whom she vaguely remembers. Damon attacks her and takes her to a rooftop, where Stefan hears her screaming from afar. Damon compels her to believe that Stefan attacked her, trying to convince Stefan to kill her and protect their identities. When Stefan refuses, Damon again compels her to believe that an animal attacked her and refuses to explain why he returned to Mystic Falls.

Stefan returns home and is met by Elena, who says that she was afraid to begin a relationship with him due to her previous traumas. He reassures her and they kiss. Meanwhile, Damon seduces and bites Caroline.

== Reception ==
=== Ratings ===
In its original American broadcast, "The Night of the Comet" was watched by 3.78 million; down by 1.13 from the previous episode.

=== Reviews ===
"The Night of the Comet" received positive reviews.

Liana Aghajanian from Mania gave the episode a B rate saying that Damon steals the show "with his cocky attitude and intentions to ruin Stefan’s high school fantasy and budding relationship with Elena."

Zeba from Two Cents TV states that this episode is better than last week's: "Though still incredibly formulaic, this episode was certainly better than last week’s. The plot seems to be thickening and as usual Ian Somerhalder is incredibly enjoyable as the villain."

Cynthia from Every Joe gave a good review to the episode saying that it was "hot".

Lucia from Heroine TV also gave a good review to the episode stating: "I must admit that I’m really loving this show–I have re-watched both episodes multiple times, which is a rarity for me. I’m definitely in for the long haul."
