= Death Do Us Part =

- DVD released by Anchor Bay Entertainment
- Directed by: Nicholas Humphries
- Written by: Julia Benson; Ryan Copple; Peter Benson
- Produced by: Kaleena Kiff; Julia Benson; Ryan Copple; Peter Benson
- Starring: Kyle Cassie; Julia Benson; Dave Collette; Peter Benson; Emilie Ullerup; Aaron Douglas; Benjamin Ayres; Christine Chatelain
- Cinematography: Christopher Charles Kempinski
- Edited by: Kirby Jinnah
- Music by: Kim Oxlund; Maya Saxell
- Production company: Nine Worlds Entertainment
- Distributed by: Anchor Bay Entertainment
- Release date: April 15, 2014 (United States)
- Running time: 89 minutes
- Country: Canada
- Language: English

Death Do Us Part is a 2014 horror film directed by Nicholas Humphries, and written by Julia Benson, Ryan Copple, and Peter Benson.

== Plot ==
A disheveled woman in a bridal gown is found stumbling along a highway, and is brought to a ranger station. As they wait for the sheriff, the only on-duty ranger asks the woman her name, and what happened to her. The bride refers to herself as Kennedy, and the film flashes back to the previous day, to when Kennedy, her fiancé Ryan, Kennedy's half-sister Hannah, their friend Emily, Ryan's cousin Derrick, and Ryan's friend Chet travelled to a secluded cabin for a Stag and doe party.

As the characters set up at the cabin, it is revealed that almost all of them have a dark secret; Kennedy's unspecified mental illness is flaring up due to wedding-related stress, Ryan is having an affair with Hannah, Derrick intends to extort Kennedy through Ryan in order to get the money he owes a drug dealer, and the caretaker, Bo, is the prime suspect in the disappearance of his wife, Susan. That night, while everyone else is participating in a scavenger hunt, Derrick is murdered with an axe. Upon noticing that Derrick is missing, the others go to look for him, and become separated, with Kennedy and Ryan finding Derrick's corpse, and Emily presumably being murdered after she, Chet, and Hannah encounter Bo, who has the axe that was used to kill Derrick. The remaining partiers regroup at the cabin, and discover that the power has been cut, the vehicle has been sabotaged, and that all of the cellular phones have been thrown into the stove. Chet then goes missing, Bo is found dying from a head wound, and Hannah is knifed by someone wearing a burlap sack as a mask. Kennedy stumbles onto Emily and Chet's bodies, and then Hannah's, which Ryan is with. Thinking Ryan is the killer, Kennedy attacks him, and runs off.

At dawn, Ryan returns to the cabin, where he and Kennedy fight, ending with Kennedy stabbing Ryan to death after Ryan spitefully declares that he never loved her. Kennedy then goes into hysterics, puts on her wedding dress, and runs into Emily, who claims that she had only been injured, and had faked being dead. The two women begin to walk to safety, until Emily lets slip information that only the killer could know. Kennedy confronts Emily, who asserts that she slew Derrick and Hannah, and had intended to murder Ryan, to protect her, with Chet and Bo being collateral damage. Kennedy snaps, and strangles Emily.

The film returns to the intro, and the bride lifts her veil to reveal that she is Emily, who had recovered, bludgeoned Kennedy, and taken her gown. The ranger offers his condolences for all that "Kennedy" has gone through, and when he gives Emily a pen to write down who he should contact for her, she stabs him in the neck with it, and walks out into the woods, leaving her fate unknown.

== Cast ==
- Julia Benson as Kennedy Jamieson
- Peter Benson as Ryan Harris
- Emilie Ullerup as Emily Hawkins
- Christine Chatelain as Hannah Jamieson
- Kyle Cassie as Chet Donovan
- Benjamin Ayres as Derrick Harris
- Dave Collette as Bo Emery
- Aaron Douglas as Harry Simpson
- Viv Leacock as Steve
- Willis Horst as Gunther

== Reception ==
Nav Qateel of 1nflux Magazine said that, while Death Do Us Part had its shortcomings, it was still something "I wouldn't hesitate recommending to anyone into horror". A lukewarm review was given was by Christian Bates-Hardy of Rock! Shock! Pop!, who concluded, "Death Do Us Part does a fairly good job of building tension up between the characters and establishing subplots and drama between them, but once it becomes a horror film the whole thing unravels and quickly becomes a directionless mess. The characters do a lot of pointless running around and screaming for no apparent reason, and it becomes very tedious until the last ten to fifteen minutes. I was ready to divorce this movie until the final twist was revealed. The ending has a surprisingly nasty edge that somewhat redeems the movie, but doesn't quite make up for the lack of direction and poor script". In his coverage of Death Do Us Part for the Canadian Film Review, Mark Weeden called the picture a hackneyed affair that was devoid of fright, but full of boring kills, cringe-worthy attempts at emotion, and "Huh?"-inducing plot developments. DVD Verdict's Patrick Bromley wrote that the "totally forgettable" Death Do Us Part is "the most frustrating kind of horror movie: the kind that strives only for mediocrity and achieves it".
