= Raugi Yu =

Canadian actor (born 1963)

Yu Raugi
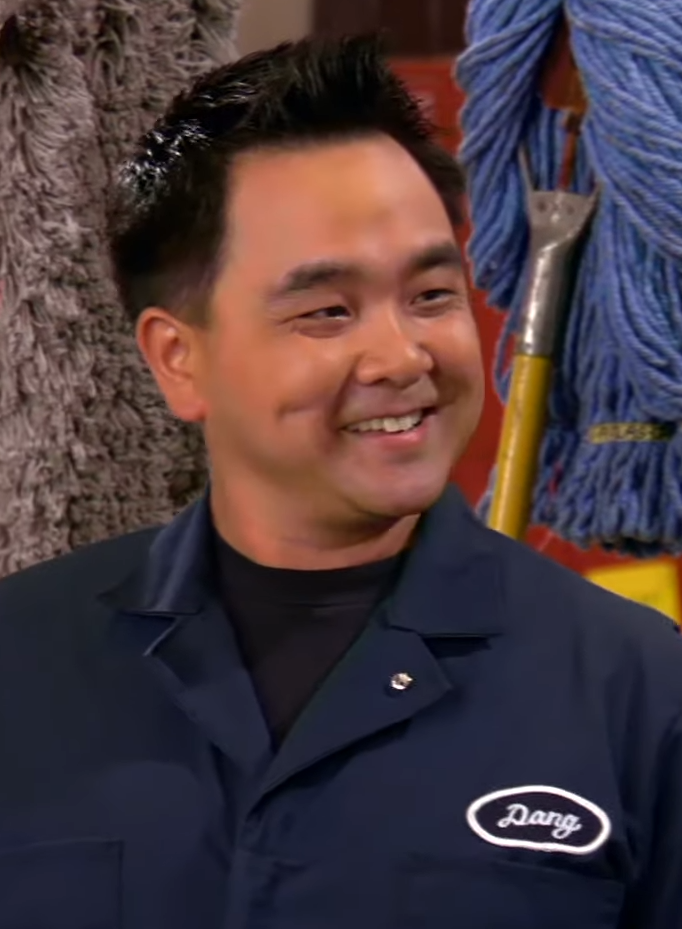
- Yu as Dang in Mr. Young
- Born: December 31, 1963 (age 62); Montreal, Quebec, Canada
- Occupation: Actor
- Years active: 1998; 2001-2008; 2011-2014; 2016-2017; 2021

Raugi Yu is a Canadian actor. He is best known for his role as Kam Fong in JPod. He is also a director and acting coach. Yu trained at Dawson College's theatre program in Montreal. He then moved to Vancouver, British Columbia, where he earned his BFA through the acting program at the University of British Columbia.

== Television career ==
In the late 1990s, Yu began appearing on television. In 1998, he appeared in one episode of The Sentinel. In 2001, he was the voice of the Cook in several episodes of the PBS children's animated series, Sagwa, the Chinese Siamese Cat and also in an episode of Dark Angel. From 2002 – 2004, he appeared in three episodes of Da Vinci's Inquest. He was seen in one episode of Gather Up Little People episodes of Dead Like Me in 2003, two episodes of The Dead Zone in 2003 and 2004, as well as playing the Chinese son in the film Spook in 2003.

In 2005, he also supplied the voice of Wendy's Butler in an episode of the animated series The Cramp Twins. He is also friends with Selene Rose – a notable member of UBC Improv of Vancouver, British Columbia

In 2006, Yu appeared in the television shows Intelligence, and Masters Of Horror. In 2007, he played Dennis in When a Man Falls in the Forest and Wayne Kwan in an episode of Eureka. Most recently, Yu was seen as Kam Fong on the series JPod.

Yu was part of the recurring cast of Mr. Young as Dang the janitor.

In the 2017 film 8 Minutes Ahead, Yu plays one of the lead roles, Danny.

== Theatre ==
During his early acting years, Yu was seen in several theatre productions, which soon grew into his film and television work.

For several years, during the 90s and early 2000s, Yu was an actor at Bard On The Beach in Vancouver, where he now continues to be an acting coach.

In 2002, Yu portrayed The King Of Siam in Theatre Under The Star's theatre production of The King And I.

Yu played Dom in The Shoplifters, a play written and directed by Morris Panych, in 2019.

== Directing ==
In the spring of 2008, Yu directed The Odd Couple for the Vancouver Asian Canadian Theatre company.

As of 2010–2011, Raugi teaches acting courses at New Image College of Fine Arts in Vancouver, British Columbia. He also teaches the summer Young Shakespearian program which Bard puts on every year for youth ages eight to eighteen.

== Filmography ==
=== Film ===
- Diary of a Wimpy Kid (2010) as Vice Principal Roy
- Marmaduke (2010) as Drama Trainer

=== Television ===
- The Sentinel (1998) as Monk
- Police Academy: The Series (1998) as Manager
- Sagwa, the Chinese Siamese Cat (2001) as Cook
- Dark Angel (2001) as Ticket Taker
- Da Vinci's Inquest (2002–2004) as Constable
- Dead Like Me (2003) as Raugi
- The Dead Zone (2003-2004) as Michael Nazawa
- The Cramp Twins (2005) as Wendy's Butler
- The Evidence (2006) as CSU Cop
- Intelligence (2006) as Henry Yu
- Masters Of Horror (2006) as Phantom
- Eureka (2007) as Wayne Kwan
- JPod (2008) as Kam Fong
- A Fairly Odd Movie: Grow Up, Timmy Turner! (2011) as Asian Waiter
- Mr. Young (2011-2013) as Dang
- Arrow (2013) as Asian Driver
- Jinxed (2013) as Science Teacher
- The Stanley Dynamic (2014) as Chapman
- Supernatural (2016) as Crew Member #2
- Some Assembly Required (2016) as Mr. Jannetty
- iZombie (2017) as Stanley Chen
- Prison Break (2017) as Driver
- Kung Fu (2021) as Professor Chau

=== Staff work ===
- Air Bud: World Pup (2000) - Set Dresser
- War (2007) - Stunts
