= Pilot (The Vampire Diaries) =

- The Vampire Diaries episode
- Episode no.: Season 1 Episode 1
- Directed by: Marcos Siega
- Teleplay by: Kevin Williamson; Julie Plec
- Cinematography by: Ramsey Nickell
- Editing by: Joshua Butler
- Production code: 296766
- Original air date: September 10, 2009

Guest appearance
- Chris William Martin as Zach Salvatore

Episode chronology
| ← Previous — | Next → "The Night of the Comet" |
- The Vampire Diaries season 1

"Pilot" is the first episode of the first season of the American supernatural teen drama television series The Vampire Diaries. It aired on The CW on September 10, 2009. The teleplay was written by Kevin Williamson and Julie Plec, and directed by Marcos Siega.

== Plot ==
A young couple (Steve Belford and Cindy Busby) are driving when the area suddenly fills with thick fog. They hit a person, and when they stop to see if they are injured, the person kills them.

In the small town of Mystic Falls, Virginia, Elena Gilbert (Nina Dobrev) and her younger brother Jeremy (Steven R. McQueen) are struggling with the deaths of their parents in a car crash, which Elena survived. Their aunt Jenna (Sara Canning) takes them in as their legal guardian. Elena is emotionally withdrawn after breaking up with her boyfriend and former best friend, Matt Matt (Zach Roerig), while Jeremy begins using drugs. Elena's friend Bonnie (Kat Graham) drives her to school, telling Elena that her grandmother said she is a psychic. At school, Elena meets a mysterious new student, Stefan Salvatore (Paul Wesley), who is secretly a vampire that is over 150 years old.

While Elena is visiting her parents' grave, a crow appears and fog starts covering the cemetery. She starts running and trips, cutting her leg open and dropping her journal. Stefan finds her, but the smell of Elena's blood causes a change in Stefan's face and he vanishes. He later goes to Elena's house to return the journal and apologize for leaving. She invites Stefan to a restaurant with Matt, Bonnie, and their friend Caroline (Candice King), where they all plan to attend a back-to-school party the following night.

At the Salvatore house, Stefan's relative Zach (Chris William Martin) asks Stefan why he returned and accuses him of killing the couple. Stefan denies involvement with the attack and leaves to attend the party. There, Bonnie touches Elena and has a vision of the crow and the fog-covered cemetery. Suspicious of Stefan, she touches him and senses death.

Meanwhile, Jeremy finds Matt's sister Vicki (Kayla Ewell) in the woods, bitten by something they believe to be an animal; he takes her to the hospital. Stefan realizes that there is another vampire in town who is responsible for the attacks. He returns home and finds his brother, Damon (Ian Somerhalder), who is also a vampire. Damon explains that he is in town for Elena as she looks identical to Katherine, a woman whom Stefan keeps a picture of from 1864. Damon tells Stefan to feed on Elena and the siblings get into a fight. Damon, who is stronger from feeding on human blood, beats Stefan and tells him not to intervene.

When Vicki wakes up in the hospital, Matt asks what attacked her. She whispers "vampire" before falling back asleep.

== Production ==
Initially, Kevin Williamson had little interest in developing the series, finding the premise too similar to other vampire tales. However, at Julie Plec's urging, he began to read the novels and started to become intrigued by the story: "I began to realize that it was a story about a small town, about that town's underbelly and about what lurks under the surface." Williamson has stated the town's story will be the main focus of the series, rather than high school.

On February 6, 2009, Variety announced that The CW had greenlit the pilot for The Vampire Diaries with Williamson and Julie Plec set as the head writers and executive producers. On May 19, 2009, the series was officially ordered for the 2009–2010 season.

The pilot episode was filmed in Vancouver, British Columbia, but the rest of the episodes have been filmed in Covington, Georgia (which doubles as the fictional small town of Mystic Falls, Virginia) and various other communities around Greater Atlanta, to take advantage of local tax incentives.

== Feature music ==
In the Pilot episode of the show we can hear the songs:

- "Here We Go" by Mat Kearney
- "Siren Song" by Bat for Lashes
- "Never Say Never" by The Fray
- "Back to Me" by The All-American Rejects
- "Death" by White Lies
- "Running Up that Hill" by Placebo
- "Kids" by MGMT
- "Thinking of You" by Katy Perry
- "Say (All I Need)" by OneRepublic
- "Consolers of the Lonely" by The Raconteurs
- "Sort Of" by Silversun Pickups
- "Take me to the Riot" by Stars
- "Kuh" by Lalala

== Reception ==
=== Ratings ===
The initial 30 minutes of the episode was watched by 4.713 million of viewers, with 5.100 million of viewers tuning in for the second half of the hour, bringing the total of viewers up to a total of 4.906 million of viewers. Plus the Live + 7 DVR Ratings the series premiere scored an even higher 5.7 million of viewers. Till date, is the most watched episode in the history of the show.

=== Reviews ===
Dan Phillips from IGN gave the episode 7/10 and compared it with the Twilight movie and the series Dawson's Creek. "The Vampires Diaries obviously isn't the most original show, but it's not without its redeeming qualities. A good chunk of the show's target demographic of angst-ridden teenagers will likely fall in love at first sight, and their male counterparts might even derive some entertainment out of it as well. That said, if my girlfriend voiced an interest in sitting down to watch this romantic vampire show together, I'd probably ask her if we could watch True Blood instead."

Alyse Wax of Fearnet stated that the show is "worth viewing" with a "strong cast" and she was "pleasantly surprised". "I honestly thought it was going to be another teen throwaway, capitalizing on the success of Twilight. But having Kevin Williamson (Scream, Dawson's Creek) at the helm definitely bumps up the quality of the show several notches. Pilots are notoriously weak: they have to set up an entire cast of characters, an episode plot as well as a series arc, and often have significantly less time and resources than a standard series episode. The Vampire Diaries pilot took its time – Damon wasn't even introduced until the last act."

Liana Aghajanian of Mania gave a good review to the episode saying that is "not as sucky as you think" and stated: "For all its plot similarities to other current vampire dramas, somewhat stagnant dialogue and hard to believe scare tactics, “The Vampire Diaries” has zoned in on an audience that will remain faithful to the show – no matter how many times they've seen the bites, camera and action before."

Cheril Vernon of Crushable also gave a good review to the episode saying that it was "creepy at times" and with "great supporting characters".

Emily St. James from The A.V. Club rated the episode a C−.
