= Friday Night Bites =

- The Vampire Diaries episode
- Episode no.: Season 1 Episode 3
- Directed by: John Dahl
- Written by: Barbie Kligman; Bryan M. Holdman
- Cinematography by: Paul M. Sommers
- Editing by: Lance Anderson
- Production code: 2J5002
- Original air date: September 24, 2009

Guest appearance
- Benjamin Ayres as William Tanner

Episode chronology
← Previous "The Night of the Comet"	Next → "Family Ties"
- The Vampire Diaries season 1

"Friday Night Bites" is the third episode of the first season of the American supernatural teen drama television series The Vampire Diaries. It aired on The CW on September 24, 2009. The episode was written by co-executive producer Barbie Kligman and executive story editor Bryan M. Holdman, and directed by John Dahl.

== Plot ==
Caroline (Candice Accola) awakens after the night she spent with Damon (Ian Somerhalder) to find bite marks on her neck. She tries to escape from her room before Damon hears her, but he thwarts her attempt and attacks her again.

Bonnie (Kat Graham) worries about Elena (Nina Dobrev) being with Stefan (Paul Wesley) after the bad feeling she had when she touched his hand. She tries to talk Elena out of committing to dating him but Elena is not convinced and instead she arranges a dinner at her place where Bonnie will have the chance to know Stefan better and see that there is nothing wrong with him.

Vicki (Kayla Ewell) invites Jeremy (Steven R. McQueen) to a concert as friends. But he becomes angry, because he wants to be more than her friend and, out of frustration, he accuses her of only sleeping with him for the drugs.

Tyler (Michael Trevino) picks on Matt (Zach Roerig) for his lack of action as Elena and Stefan grow noticeably closer. When Tyler throws a football at Stefan's head in an attempt to make a fool of him, Stefan deftly catches it, surprising everyone. Elena suggests that Stefan should join the football team in order to make friends, something that Stefan does even though at the beginning he is not very positive to the idea. Stefan asks Mr Tanner (Benjamin Ayres) to let him join the team but Tanner refuses because Stefan embarrassed him during history class. But Mr Tanner lets him try out and, impressed by his skills, lets Stefan join the team.

Meanwhile, at cheer practice, Caroline shows up late because of Damon and Elena messes up the routine and eventually stops to watch Stefan play football.

Elena and Bonnie prepare the dinner while waiting for Stefan and Bonnie tells Elena that she keeps seeing the numbers 8, 14 and 22, but she does not know what they mean. Stefan arrives but the dinner is awkward until Elena mentions that Bonnie's grandmother claims that their family are witches that come from Salem. Stefan tells Bonnie that her family heritage of witches is something to be proud of and Bonnie becomes more comfortable around Stefan.

Caroline and Damon arrive unexpectedly and Stefan tries to convince Elena not to invite him in the house but she does not listen. During the evening's conversation, Damon makes a cryptic comment referring to their past with Katherine. Elena guesses that Damon also loved Katherine, surprising him by expressing her sympathy for him having lost her too. Meanwhile, Stefan confirms his suspicion that Damon is feeding off Caroline and attempts to convince him that humans are not to be used as toys. In response, Damon reminds Stefan that he has been invited into Elena's house and he can come back whenever he wants and do whatever he wants. He comes back in the evening and invades in one of Elena's dreams.

Stefan ponders how to make Damon see his own humanity and how to protect Elena. At the football game, he gives her a necklace with vervain in it so Damon will not be able to affect her. Prior to the game, Mr Tanner gives a pep talk that highlights Stefan's talents, infuriating Tyler. A drunken Jeremy attacks Tyler because of the way he treats Vicki and a fight ensues between them. Stefan attempts to break it up but he cuts his hand. Elena sees his injured hand but when she tries to check on him, the wound has already healed, making her suspicious. This suspicion leads Elena to question Bonnie about her strange feeling she has for Stefan, and Bonnie tells her that it felt like death.

Damon follows Elena to her car and attempts to compel her, and then he tries to kiss her. Elena slaps him and reminds him that she is not Katherine. Damon figures out that the necklace Stefan gave her contains vervain and that is why he was not able to compel her. He confronts Stefan and threatens to harm Elena. Stefan tells him that no matter how tough he is trying to be, he still has humanity in him. Damon, to prove him wrong, kills Mr Tanner before his eyes.

Matt discovers Mr Tanner's body and calls for help. As the ambulance takes away the body, Bonnie watches in shock when she sees a sign for building eight, the number 14 on a license plate, and parking space 22 where Mr Tanner was killed - the three numbers she was seeing the whole day.

Elena is confused and upset by the evening's events and Stefan assures her that they will be fine. After what happened, Stefan later writes in his journal that he is now convinced that there is nothing good left in Damon and that he must be stopped. At the same time, Damon is in Elena's room watching her sleep, (hinting he may have some type of feelings for her) but he leaves just as she wakes up.

== Feature music ==
"Friday Night Bites" uses the following songs:

- "Slow Poison" by The Bravery
- "Blue Day" by Darker My Love
- "Starstrukk" by 3OH!3
- "Strange Times" by The Black Keys
- "You're A Wolf" by Sea Wolf
- "Papillon" by The Airborne Toxic Event
- "Temptation" by Moby
- "Hang You from the Heavens" by The Dead Weather
- "Cut" by Plumb

== Cultural references ==
- While Damon reads Stefan's journal, he tells him, "Very Emerson, the way you reveal your soul with so many adjectives." referring to the American writer Ralph Waldo Emerson.

== Reception ==
=== Ratings ===
In its original American broadcast, "Friday Night Bites" was watched by 3.81 million, slightly up by 0.03 from the previous episode.

=== Reviews ===
"Friday Night Bites" received positive reviews with some of them commenting on the chemistry between Damon and Elena.

Lucia from Heroine TV wrote, "The third episode is my favorite episode of The Vampire Diaries yet. Vampires plus Friday Night Lights? The death of the most annoying character on television? Sweet Matt standing up to Tyler, and making friends with Stefan? What’s not to love? I’m a very happy viewer."

Lauren Attaway from Star Pulse gave a B rating to the episode saying that "the big event of the episode was Stefan joining the football team".

Robin Franson Pruter of Forced Viewing rated the episode 3/4, praising the character of Damon. "Although the series hasn't hit its stride yet, this episode represents an improvement over the first two, largely as a result of the development of the character of Damon Salvatore. The character emerges as one of the most charmingly complex on television in two nicely juxtaposed scenes at Elena’s dinner party. [...] The character work done on Damon elevates this episode above its predecessors, and that character and all his charisma and contradictions will carry the series through the next few episodes."

Popsugar gave a good review to the episode stating, "I'm pretty psyched — with its third episode, "Friday Night Bites," Diaries has become one of my favorites of the Fall season [...] I'm really intrigued for the next few episodes — I want to know more about this Katherine-Damon-Stefan love triangle and, surprisingly, Bonnie." She also commented on the chemistry between Damon and Elena: "...the sexual tension between Elena and Damon is out of control, rejections notwithstanding. Her chemistry with Stefan is also great, but the Damon-Elena dynamic is worthy of Eric and Sookie on that other vampire show [True Blood]."

Zeba of Two Cents TV also gave a good review, saying that it was a step up from the previous week. Zeba also commented on the chemistry between Damon and Elena and compared it to the triangle of the show True Blood. "The dynamic between the two of them is pretty darn interesting – Damon is clearly trying to play the predator, the manipulator, but Elena can almost see all the way through his facade. Somehow she manages to bring out something semi-human in him. [...] Things are finally picking up in terms of plot and character development, and I cannot wait to see where the Damon and Elena storyline goes. The whole situation is very reminiscent of the Beel/Sookeh/Eric set up on True Blood."

Tiffany Vogt of The TV Watchtower wrote a good review saying, "Giving a new meaning to the phrase "walk of shame" this week’s episode opened with a classic horror movie scene [...] The horror-level is certainly not diminishing as we delve deeper into the series. If anything, it is more prevalent. For just when you think it is safe to breathe again, something jumps out and attacks — and all you can hear is your heart beating loudly as you jump with fright." On the Damon/Elena chemistry she wrote, "Surprisingly, the scenes between Damon and Elena were a lot more interesting and sizzling than one would expect. The kitchen scene where he tells Elena about Katherine was more poignant, especially after Elena softly told Damon: "I'm sorry" and when he looks back at her puzzled, she explained, " – about Katherine. You lost her too." Damon looks utterly surprised and oddly touched."

Frankie Diane Mallis from First Novels Club said that although it was not her favorite episode it was still pretty excellent.

== Book references ==
- In The Awakening, Elena no longer finds herself as enthusiastic about school activities as she once was, which is reflected in this episode.
- In the books, Stefan joins the football team as wide receiver. Matt Honeycutt is the quarterback.
- Mystic Falls High School's team colors are black and red, the same as Robert E. Lee High School.
- Mr Tanner was also killed in the books by Damon.
- In the novels, Bonnie's heritage leads back to the Celtic Druids and Stefan mentions them in the episode when he is talking to Bonnie during dinner at the Gilbert house.
- In The Struggle, Damon haunts Elena's dream before Stefan gives her vervain as protection.
- At the beginning of The Struggle, Elena confronts Damon and gives him "a good hard slap", which is also her move when he accosts her in the parking lot after the football game.
- Just as Stefan tries to get through to his brother in this episode, in Dark Reunion he tells him, "You can pretend you don't care. You can fool the whole world. But I know differently."
