= Riese: Kingdom Falling =

Television series

- DVD cover for the series
- Genre: Science fiction Fantasy; Steampunk
- Created by: Ryan Copple; Kaleena Kiff
- Starring: Christine Chatelain; Sharon Taylor; Ben Cotton; Patrick Gilmore; Allison Mack; Alessandro Juliani; Emilie Ullerup; Ryan Robbins
- Narrated by: Amanda Tapping
- Original language: English
- No. of seasons: 1
- No. of episodes: 10

Production
- Producers: Galen Fletcher; Nicholas Humphries
- Production locations: Vancouver, British Columbia
- Running time: 6–11 minutes

Original release
- Network: Syfy.com
- Release: 2011

Riese: Kingdom Falling is a science fiction-fantasy web series which debuted on Syfy.com on November 2, 2009 (under the title Riese: The Series). The series is about a traveller named Riese, who flees across the wartorn lands of Eleysia with her wolf, Fenrir. Hunted by a terrifying religious group, The Sect, Riese must evade the assassins that have been sent to kill her and discover their true objective.

== Production ==
Riese is co-created by Ryan Copple and Kaleena Kiff, and produced by Galen Fletcher and Nicholas Humphries. Production of the first five episodes was completed on Sept. 2, 2009. The first chapter went online during the fall of 2009 and was very successful, so that a second chapter was developed. This drew Syfy's attention: Syfy digital owned by NBC Universal decided to buy the broadcasting rights.

The cast of Riese includes actors and actresses from other notable science fiction and fantasy television series, such as Stargate and Sanctuary's Amanda Tapping; Sanctuary's Ryan Robbins and Emilie Ullerup; Stargate Universe's Patrick Gilmore and Peter Kelamis; Stargate Atlantis's Ben Cotton; Battlestar Galactica's Alessandro Juliani and Smallville's Allison Mack.

Syfy started airing Riese on October 26, 2010 with a new name: Riese: Kingdom Falling.

On November 30, 2010, Space announced that Riese will start airing on spacecast.com early in 2011, making Canada the first country after the United States to air the complete webseries.

Riese has been noted for its usage of the Red One, a digital cinematography camera. It is also one of the first live action sci-fi web series to feature the steampunk genre. Production-value wise, it has been compared to the web efforts of Sanctuary and features a cast of top Sci-Fi actors from a variety of shows. It is also one of the first dramatic web series to incorporate animals as one of their cast ensemble.

== Characters & organizations ==
- Riese (Christine Chatelain) – daughter of Empress Kara and King Ulric of Eleysia, a fugitive since Amara's coup.
- Fenrir (Tundra) – Riese's companion, a wolf, formerly of the royal bodyguard.
- The Narrator (Amanda Tapping, Riese: Kingdom Falling only)
- Empress Amara (Sharon Taylor) – cousin of the late queen. She was a baroness until she aided the Sect in slaughtering members of the royal family, thus establishing herself as the Empress of Eleysia.
- Magister Herrick (Ben Cotton) – senior magister of the Sect, he leads the hunt for Riese.
- Trennan (Patrick Gilmore) – a mid-ranking Sect member, liaison between Empress Amara and the Sect. Though Trennan must assist Herrick, he finds his methods unnecessarily cruel.
- Rand (Ryan Robbins) – leader of the Resistance.
- Garin (Alessandro Juliani) – tactical commander of the Resistance.
- Aliza (Emilie Ullerup) – Rand's second in command, and the de facto general of the Resistance army. She plans to use the Resistance army to establish a people's government.
- Marlise (Allison Mack) – an ambitious, sadistic and manipulative member of the Sect.
- Ritter – Original founder of the Sect, supposedly chosen by Goddess Sonne herself. He was the first to have the holy artifacts of the Sect fused to his body. Is said to have perished centuries ago.
- Arkin – Previous Prince of Eleysia, and brother of Riese. Was believed killed in the coup that was organized by Amara and the Sect. It is later revealed that he survived the coup.
- Kara – Previous Empress of Eleysia. Was killed in the coup that was organized by her cousin, Amara, and the Sect.
- Ulric – Previous King of Eleysia. Was killed in the coup that was organized by his wife's cousin, Amara, and the Sect.
- The Sect – This enigmatic group, now the official religion of Eleysia, is as powerful as it is merciless. Worshipping the Goddess Sonne, they believe the end of the world is coming, and the only path to salvation is eliminating all those who refuse to follow their path.
  They orchestrated the coup against the previous rulers of Eleysia to place the Anointed One on the throne, using Amara as a puppet to act temporarily as empress.
  Sect members are infamous for the strange relics that are affixed to both their clothing and skin. According to their lore, these holy artifacts bring them closer to their Goddess, Sonne.
- The Resistance – a group whose goal is to reverse Amara's conquest of Eleysia and its surrounding countries.

== Web series (2009) ==
The original Riese web series ("Riese: The Series") was divided into two chapters, with a total of six episodes. It was available on the creators' website and on YouTube, beginning November 2, 2009.

- Chapter 1: Helmkin
  - 1 – The Hunt (09:03 minutes)
  - 2 – Fragments (09:09 minutes)
  - 3 – Bind (08:58 minutes)
  - 4 – Spares (08:41 minutes)
  - 5 – Dawn (10:20 minutes)
- Chapter 2: Vidar
  - 1 – Beast (11:34 minutes)

Shortly after releasing Beast, the producers withdrew all online episodes, due to the deal with Syfy, who purchased the broadcast rights.

== TV series (2010–11) ==
Syfy broadcast one season of Riese: Kingdom Falling, consisting of ten episodes, beginning October 26, 2010, also available on their website and Hulu.

Existing webisodes were recut, rearranged and renamed for the Syfy broadcast, and new footage was added introducing Amanda Tapping as narrator.

No.	Title	Directed by	Written by	Original release date	Length
1	"Hunt"	Kaleena Kiff	Ryan Copple, Kaleena Kiff, Miguel Valdez Lopez, Alyssa Ciccarelli	26 October 2010	9:44
Riese and her wolf, Fenrir, fight off hunters the Sect has sent to capture her. She is wounded and seeks help in the village of Helmkin.
2	"Bind"	Kaleena Kiff	Ryan Copple, Kaleena Kiff, Miguel Valdez Lopez, Alyssa Ciccarelli	27 October 2010	9:05
Riese is treated in a hospital, and discovers a secret ward full of newborn babies. The empress assigns Herrick to track her down.
3	"Fragments"	Kaleena Kiff	Ryan Copple, Kaleena Kiff, Miguel Valdez Lopez, Alyssa Ciccarelli	2 November 2010	9:15
Riese finds the babies in a warehouse, ready to be shipped away.
4	"Spares"	Kaleena Kiff	Ryan Copple, Kaleena Kiff, Miguel Valdez Lopez, Alyssa Ciccarelli	3 November 2010	8:24
Riese finds a ledger documenting the Sect's baby shipments and escapes from Helmkin.
5	"Dawn"	Kaleena Kiff	Ryan Copple, Kaleena Kiff, Miguel Valdez Lopez, Alyssa Ciccarelli	8 November 2010	7:26
Riese slips out of Helmkin and continues on her journey for safety.
6	"Prey"	Nicholas Humphries	Ryan Copple, Alyssa Ciccarelli, Kaleena Kiff	1 February 2011	6:22
Riese follows the trail of child shipments to Vidar only to find the town strangely empty of citizens.
7	"Beast"	Nicholas Humphries	Ryan Copple, Alyssa Ciccarelli, Kaleena Kiff	15 February 2011	8:45
The terrible secret of Vidar is revealed.
8	"Indoctrination"	Nicholas Humphries	Ryan Copple, Alyssa Ciccarelli, Kaleena Kiff	1 March 2011	9:20
Riese searches for safety as she is pursued by the Sect's failed creations.
9	"Retribution"	Nicholas Humphries	Ryan Copple, Alyssa Ciccarelli, Kaleena Kiff	15 March 2011	8:17
Still in Vidar, Riese learns of a more complex plot weaved by the Sect that involves a close family member.
10	"Reunion"	Nicholas Humphries	Ryan Copple, Alyssa Ciccarelli, Kaleena Kiff	29 March 2011	11:18
Tired from her journey and numb from the realization of the Sect's twisted plot, Riese is caught by surprise by Herrick and his henchmen.

== The Sect Is Here – alternate reality game ==
The Sect Is Here, an online alternate reality game, began on 20 September 2009 at thesectishere.com. The game centers around the Sect, the villainous religious cult from Riese, existing in our world. Players must solve numerous online and location-specific puzzles in order to unravel the true objectives of the Sect.
