= When a Man Falls in the Forest =

- Directed by: Ryan Eslinger
- Written by: Ryan Eslinger
- Produced by: Mary L. Aloe; Christian Arnold-Beutel; Alain de la Mata; Kirk Shaw
- Starring: Timothy Hutton; Sharon Stone; Dylan Baker; Pruitt Taylor Vince
- Cinematography: Lawrence Sher
- Edited by: Jamie Alain; Ryan Eslinger
- Music by: Billy Corgan
- Distributed by: Screen Media Films
- Release date: February 12, 2007 (Berlin Film Festival)
- Running time: 86 minutes
- Country: United States
- Language: English

When A Man Falls in the Forest is a 2007 American drama film directed by Ryan Eslinger and starring Dylan Baker, Timothy Hutton, Sharon Stone, and Pruitt Taylor Vince. It premiered in competition at the 2007 Berlin Film Festival where it was nominated for the Golden Bear and later screened at the SXSW Film Festival.

Smashing Pumpkins leader Billy Corgan contributed three previously unreleased songs to the film's soundtrack: "Shangra-La", "Sky of Blue", and "Whisper".

== Cast ==
- Dylan Baker as Bill
- Stacie Bono as Sadie
- Timothy Hutton as Gary Fields
- Sharon Stone as Karen Fields
- Pruitt Taylor Vince as Travis
- Nicholas Elia as Eric
- John Prowse as Business Man 3
- Phillip Mitchell as Mr. Curtis
- Kendall Cross as Tricia, woman in bar
- Tony Alcantar as Hardware store customer
- Michael Eklund as Hardware store cashier
- Raugi Yu as Dennis
- Bill Mackenzie as Fred
- Dean Redman as Security guard
- Link Baker as Adam
- Monique Ganderton as Woman with red scarf
