= Christine Chatelain =

Canadian actress (active 1996– )

- Born: 8 February 1985 (age 41)
- Occupation: Actress
- Years active: 1996–present

Christine Chatelain (born 8 February 1985) is a Canadian film and television actress. She had a recurring role on The Collector as Taylor Slate. Originally an art student in Vancouver, she tried acting as a hobby and quickly gained roles in 40 Days and 40 Nights and 3000 Miles to Graceland.

== Filmography ==
=== Film ===
| Year | Title | Role | Notes |
|---|---|---|---|
| 1999 | Late Night Sessions | Zoie | |
| 2000 | Final Destination | Blake Dreyer | |
| 2001 | Seeking Winonas | Kaitlin | |
| 2001 | 3000 Miles to Graceland | Sexy Waitress | |
| 2002 | 40 Days and 40 Nights | Andie | |
| 2002 | Stark Raving Mad | Tonya | |
| 2004 | Intern Academy | Mitzi Cole | |
| 2004 | Road Kill | Andie | Short film |
| 2008 | Chaos Theory | Tracy | |
| 2008 | Dr. Dolittle: Tail to the Chief | Selma Dixon | |
| 2009 | The Mechanic | Jenny | Short film |
| 2010 | The Appointment | Disgusted Woman | Short film |
| 2010 | Me or the Porn | Colette | Short film |
| 2011 | At Lunchtime: A Story of Love | Lady in Green Hat | Short film |
| 2013 | Leap 4 Your Life | Katie | |
| 2014 | Death Do Us Part | Hannah Jamieson | |
| 2014 | What an Idiot | Angela | |
| 2017 | My Little Pony: The Movie | Additional voices | |
| 2017 | A Family for the Holidays | Becky | Short film |
| 2022 | Never Broken | Shirley Gordon | Short film |

=== Television ===
| Year | Title | Role | Notes |
|---|---|---|---|
| 1996 | For Hope | Ellen | TV movie |
| 1997 | Breaker High | Devia | Episode: "When in Rome..." |
| 2000 | Beggars and Choosers | Cindy | Episode: "Russian Roulette" |
| 2000 | 2gether | Lorelei | Episode: "Lorelei: Pilot" |
| 2000 | Dark Angel | Max's Young Mother | 2 episodes |
| 2000 | The Immortal | Moreena | Episode: "Prime Location" |
| 2000 | Call of the Wild | Rose | 2 episodes |
| 2001 | Strange Frequency | Farrah | Episode: "Disco Inferno" |
| 2001 | Mysterious Ways | Jenny Tergeson | Episode: "The Last Dance" |
| 2002 | Glory Days | Denise Forester | Episode: "No Guts, No Glory" |
| 2002 | Beyond Belief: Fact or Fiction | Allie Prescott | Episode: "House of Shadows" |
| 2002 | Just Cause | Laura Tyler | Episode: "Bet Your Life" |
| 2003 | The Dead Zone | Nicole | Episode: "Cabin Pressure" |
| 2003 | Out of Order | Brenda | 6 episodes |
| 2004 | Andromeda | Cavava | Episode: "The Spider's Stratagem" |
| 2005–2006 | The Collector | Taylor Slate | Main cast (22 episodes) |
| 2006 | The L Word | Marilyn | Episode: "Labia Majora" |
| 2006 | Whistler | Barbara Newman | Episode: "Coming Together, Coming Apart" |
| 2006 | Psych | Lacey Maxwell | Episode: "Speak Now or Forever Hold Your Piece" |
| 2006–2020 | Supernatural | Jenny/Dr. Ellen Piccolo | 3 episodes |
| 2007 | Blood Ties | Sinead | Episode: "Deadly Departed" |
| 2007 | Smallville | Tempest Drake | Episode: "Fierce" |
| 2007 | Masters of Science Fiction | Marissa Summer | Episode: "Watchbird" |
| 2007 | The Dark Room | Abby Allbright | TV movie |
| 2008–2009 | Sanctuary | Clara Griffin | 5 episodes |
| 2009 | Fear Itself | Jackie | Episode: "Chance" |
| 2009 | Storm in the Heartland | Helen | TV movie |
| 2009 | Storm Seekers | Jessica Tillner | TV movie |
| 2009–2010 | Riese: Kingdom Falling | Riese | Main cast (10 episodes) |
| 2010 | Fringe | Krista Manning | Episode: "Northwest Passage" |
| 2011 | Yesterday, Today and Tomorrow | Jackie Bell | TV movie, a.k.a. Time after Time |
| 2011 | Kits | Ali | TV movie |
| 2011 | Magic Beyond Words | Bryony Evens | TV movie |
| 2011 | White Collar Poet | Gloria | 5 episodes |
| 2012 | Alcatraz | Megan Palmer | Episode: "Clarence Montgomery" |
| 2013 | Motive | Grace Jacobs | Episode: "Crimes of Passion" |
| 2014 | When Calls the Heart | Laurel Miller | 2 episodes |
| 2015–2016 | The Man in the High Castle | Laura Crothers | 3 episodes |
| 2016 | Dater's Handbook | Nadia | TV movie |
| 2016 | Christmas List | Trish | TV movie |
| 2017 | Rogue | Melanie Lunsford-Riley | Episode: "Bifocals" |
| 2017 | My Favorite Wedding | Amber Tilton | TV movie |
| 2018 | Hailey Dean Mystery: A Marriage Made for Murder | Christy Bridgestone | TV movie |
| 2018 | Wedding March 4: Something Old, Something New | Kelsey Atwell | TV movie |
| 2018 | Take Two | Lisa Garlin | Episode: "Death Becomes Him" |
| 2018 | Falling for You | Dana Davis | TV movie |
| 2019 | The InBetween | Lydia Stern | Episode: "Let Me In Your Window" |
| 2019 | Love and Sunshine | Emma Craig | TV movie |
| 2019 | Holiday Date | Cheryl | TV movie |
| 2020 | Riverdale | Mrs. Chipping | Episode: "Chapter Sixty-Nine: Men of Honor" |
| 2021 | Deceitful Darling | Alice | TV movie |
| 2021 | Sweet Carolina | Ellie | TV movie |
| 2021 | Framed by My Husband | June Lowe | TV movie |
| 2022 | Batwoman | Samantha | Episode: "We're All Mad Here" |
| 2023 | Fire Country | Mom | Episode: "My Kinda Leader" |
| 2024 | Dead Boy Detectives | Stacey Devlin | Episode: "The Case of the Devlin House" |
| 2024 | A Novel Noel | Mayor Binky | TV movie |
| 2025 | Sight Unseen | Mrs. Avery | Episode: "Chain Reaction" |
| 2025 | Alert: Missing Persons Unit | Joan | Episode: "Carmen" |

== Awards and nominations ==
Chatelain has twice been nominated for Leo Awards, first in 2005 in the category of Best Guest Performance by a Female: Dramatic Series for her role in the episode "The Superhero" of television series The Collector and again in 2013 in the category of Best Supporting Performance by a Female: Motion Picture for her role in Death Do Us Part.
