= JPod (TV series) =

Canadian television series

jPod
- Genre: Comedy drama
- Created by: Douglas Coupland; Michael MacLennan
- Based on: jPod by Douglas Coupland
- Starring: David Kopp; Emilie Ullerup; Steph Song; Ben Ayres; Torrance Coombs; Colin Cunningham; Sherry Miller; Alan Thicke; Raugi Yu
- Theme music composer: Bonobo
- Opening theme: "Flutter"
- Country of origin: Canada
- No. of episodes: 13 (list of episodes)

Production
- Executive producers: J.B. Sugar; Larry Sugar
- Production locations: Vancouver, British Columbia
- Camera setup: Single-camera
- Running time: 45 minutes
- Production companies: I'm Feeling Lucky Productions; No Equal Entertainment

Original release
- Network: CBC Television
- Release: January 8 – April 4, 2008

jPod is a Canadian comedy-drama television series based on Douglas Coupland's 2006 novel of the same name. It premiered on CBC Television on January 8, 2008. Starting with the fifth episode, the show began airing Fridays at 9:00pm.

On March 7, 2008, it was announced that the CBC had cancelled the show due to low ratings. All of the remaining episodes—apart from episode 11, which was skipped and made available online—were broadcast.

The show's opening title theme is "Flutter" by Bonobo. Produced by I’m Feeling Lucky Productions for the CBC, jPod was created by Coupland and Michael MacLennan. Coupland also co-wrote many of the sole season's episodes.

== Plot ==
jPod chronicles the often shocking lives of Ethan Jarlewski and four of his co-workers at Neotronic Arts as they confront "Chinese gangs, boneheaded bosses, sexual swinging, British royalty and gore-laced video games." The pod was created by a Y2K glitch, which caused workers with surnames beginning with the letter J to be assigned desks together in the company's basement. jPod is made up of Ethan, Bree, Cancer Cowboy and John Doe, plus the new hire, Kaitlin.

As the series begins, jPod is assigned a new boss, Steve, who begins demanding changes to the video game jPod is working on. The team struggles to cope with the changes, which they view as detrimental, through tactics that are familiar to them: doing as little work as possible and goofing around.

Ethan also has family problems. While both his parents, Jim and Carol, appear to be normal middle class suburbanites, they harbor secrets. Carol runs a marijuana grow-op in her basement to fund her retirement. When she kills a dealer in apparent self-defense, she calls in Ethan to help her hide the body. Jim, a failing actor, has extra-marital affairs and enlists Ethan's help to keep his latest one a secret. Jim befriends Kam Fong, a Chinese mobster who appreciates him for his championships in ballroom dancing competitions. When Jim's girlfriend becomes a problem for him, he asks Kam Fong to kidnap her.

Ethan quickly falls for Kaitlin, but several things come between them, including the problems and antics in the office and the Jarlewski family, as well as the imposition of their own exes.

Steve falls in love with Carol and attempts to win her heart, despite her disinterest. Jim becomes jealous and has Kam Fong kidnap Steve. In jPod, Steve is replaced as manager by Alistair, an insane but genius designer, who makes life miserable for the jPodders.

At a party at the Jarlewski house, John Doe and Bree begin a romance.

When at the same party Ethan discovers that Jim was involved in Steve's disappearance, Kam Fong explains that Steve has been impressed into factory slavery in China. Ethan and Cowboy go to China to rescue Steve. When they arrive they discover that Steve has been forcibly addicted to heroin as a means of control. Ethan and Cowboy bring Steve back to Vancouver. There he resumes his position as jPod manager after Alistair blows himself up in a failed terrorist attack on Neotronic Arts.

Steve builds a hug machine.

When his addiction creates friction with the jPodders and his ex-wife and son, the jPodders warn Steve that he must either quit heroin or become a high functioning addict. He fails and eventually gets fired.

After discovering Jim's infidelity, Carol leaves home and moves to a lesbian commune run by John Doe's mother on the Sunshine Coast. As she leaves, she accidentally hits Steve with her car. She drives away unaware. Jim finds Steve's body and asks Ethan to help dispose of it, fearing that he had killed him while drunk. When the two determine that Carol had killed Steve, they swear to never tell her. They bury Steve's body and send a forged letter to Steve's son to explain his disappearance.

Neotronic Arts promotes Kaitlin to Steve's position just as her relationship with Ethan seems about to start. Due to a strict company policy they cannot begin the relationship after all.

A freak computer glitch reorganizes the desk assignments at Neotronic Arts, and the company president tells jPod they are being disbanded. The five jPodders must seek new positions within the company. Bree, Kaitlin, and John Doe find places in departments that they judge are more suited to their talents and personalities, but before long each one realizes they miss jPod. Meanwhile Ethan plans to leave for the San Francisco branch, and Cowboy secretly befriends an artificial intelligence that has spontaneously assembled itself from Neotronic Arts code. He tries to use this friendship to get a position as head of Neotronic Arts' artificial intelligence division. The AI asks him to connect it to the hug machine for a demonstration.

Throughout the series the team creates short gore sequences to demonstrate the video games they work on, though a finalized product is never released. In the season finale, they assemble a video farewell to jPod using all the gory material they created.

They hack the video into the company president's board meeting presentation and shock the administration of Neotronic Arts. They expect to be fired for this, but they all agree it was worth it. While John Doe, Cowboy, and Bree head off to play a last game of Defendoids, Ethan finally expresses his feelings for Kaitlin and they share a passionate kiss. When Ethan steps away to retrieve a present for Kaitlin, Kaitlin tries out the hug machine. The artificial intelligence begins to crush Kaitlin, seeing her as a rival for Ethan's affections. Ethan pulls her from the hug machine, but not before she falls into a coma.

The series ends with several cliffhangers unresolved.

== Main cast and characters ==
- David Kopp as Ethan Jarlewski, a twenty-something "gore specialist". Ethan was in med school until he dropped out, presumably to work at Neotronic Arts. He is caring but long-suffering and spends most of his time fixing the lives of people around him. He likes sneaker-collecting, old computers, old video games, and IKEA products. He became interested in gore as a child when his police officer grandfather showed him scrapbooks of crime scene photos. He is romantically interested in Kaitlin.
- Emilie Ullerup as Kaitlin Joyce, the newest jPod member. An American and a former employee of Apple, Kaitlin escaped poverty as a teen when she took a job as a surrogate mother. Her pregnancy interrupted her schooling, so she never acquired a high school diploma. This puts her job in jeopardy. She is perky, eager to please the management, and initially desperate to leave jPod. She eventually settles in and enjoys the environment, while still being the hardest working member of jPod. She was once seriously overweight but lost 150 lbs. on the "Underground Sandwich Diet". She and Ethan begin to date late in the series.
- Steph Song as Bree Jyang, a "Junior Cougar". Bree's Chinese parents raised her with extremely high standards and often made her feel inadequate for not being born a male. This results in perfectionist behavior. Bree is a "junior cougar" or a "puma". She is training to become a "cougar" (an older woman who preys on younger men for dates) and attends meetings with women who have the same goal. She and John Doe begin to date mid series.
- Ben Ayres as Cancer Cowboy (real name Casper Jesperson), a chain smoking sex addict who likes to drink cough syrup for a buzz. To scare him away from smoking, his parents told him that all the cowboys were dying of lung cancer. The plan backfired, and Cowboy started smoking because he thought it was cool. Cowboy's parents died in a murder-suicide pact when he was ten. This left him with a morbid obsession with death. He went to Yale, and is an extremely talented coder.
- Torrance Coombs as John Doe, a twenty-something who attempts to be as statistically normal as possible in response to his statistically unusual upbringing. John Doe was raised on a lesbian commune, with no television, radio, soda, or other men. His original given name was crow well mountain juniper, but he had it legally changed to John Doe shortly before the series began. John is a virgin, but very talented at cunnilingus. He begins to date Bree after she learns this.
- Colin Cunningham as Steve Lefkowitz, the new boss of jPod. Steve is friendly and high-strung. He is attempting to gain custody of his son, Connor. In the meantime, Steve makes up for not being able to see Connor by working a skateboarding turtle into Board-X, the jPodder's current game under development, because Connor likes turtles. Steve falls in love with Carol, which leads to his kidnapping, forced labor in a Chinese sweatshop, and addiction to heroin. He is eventually fired from Neotronic Arts and then hit by a car and killed.
- Sherry Miller as Carol Jarlewski, Ethan's mother, a classic uptight housewife and mother, who grows marijuana and sells it through drug dealers. Carol has an extensive gun collection, inherited from her police officer father, with which she is very proficient. She longs to be a grandmother and badgers and interferes with the lives of her sons. Late in the series, she moves to a lesbian commune, but claims that she is not a lesbian despite appearances.
- Peter Benson as Greg Jarlewski, Ethan's older brother who is a real estate agent and dates cougars (older women who like younger men). He is a friend of Kam Fong.
- Alan Thicke as Jim Jarlewski, Ethan's father, who is attempting to become an actor but only finds work as an extra. He is a ballroom dancing champion and occasionally cheats on his wife, Carol. When things get messy in his life, he turns to his friend Kam Fong to provide instant solutions.
- Raugi Yu as Kam Fong, a wealthy Chinese mobster involved in human trafficking, drugs, pornography, rigging game shows, and various other illegal activities. Kam is an avid ladies' man. He lives to ballroom dance and spend time with Jim. He can be a great friend but a dangerous enemy.

== Cancellation ==
On March 7, 2008, CBC Television announced the cancellation of jPod. After earning high praise from some critics but little viewership, CBC moved the program to Friday nights beginning with the fifth episode. This may have further brought down its ratings. "jPod has been in trouble since February, when CBC moved it from mid-week to Friday night, when viewers are difficult to attract" wrote CBC news.

== DVD release ==
On September 9, 2008, Morningstar Entertainment released a region-free DVD set in Canada containing all 13 episodes of jPod, with bonus features including deleted and alternate scenes, including segments from the unaired pilot, a gag reel, animations and interstitials.

A pressing error forced playback to skip to the next episode partway through Episode 8, The Last Shot. Morningstar soon offered a disc replacement program to those with an affected set.

== Digital distribution ==
In Canada, jPod was available to stream on demand on the CBC's website. This was a first for scripted television on the network, which previously had dabbled with online distribution of news programming. jPod was seen as an early step in the CBC's digital distribution plans, which included releasing programs via BitTorrent.

jPod was also made available to stream on demand with the relaunch of The WB in the summer of 2008 at TheWB.com. Intellectual property restrictions prevented those without American IP addresses from viewing the series on The WB.

The show was syndicated on local CBS, NBC, ABC and Fox stations in the US.

The show was also released on iTunes. There was originally a file error on iTunes which caused Episode 8: The Last Shot to play in lieu of Episode 9: Fine China. iTunes subsequently corrected the file contents and released an update to customers who purchased the series.

In the UK, the full series of jPod was available on Netflix UK and the Virgin On Demand service in both SD and HD to XL subscribers only, as well as offering the first four episodes on the Virgin Central channel in June 2009.

== Soundtrack ==
=== Episode 1: I Love Turtles ===
- Fndmntl – Celly Cue
- The Tragically Hip – Flamenco
- Tegan and Sara – Walking With A Ghost
- Bonobo – Noctuary
- Stars – What The Snowman Learned About Love

=== Episode 2: A Fine Bro-Mance ===
- Chromeo – Tenderoni
- Cassette Won't Listen – The Sidewalk Cruise
- Bonobo – Noctuary
- Joel Plaskett – Fashionable People
- Linda Martinez – Cha Cha
- Bonobo – Ketto
- Linda Martinez – High Society Social
- Thaddeus Hillary – Dance And Swing
- Mr. Scruff – Blackpool Roll
- The Dragons – Food For My Soul

=== Episode 3: Emo-tion Capture ===
- Bonobo – Wayward Bob
- Datarock – Fa-Fa-Fa
- Bonobo – Ketto
- DJ Vadim – Black Is The Night
- Bonobo – The Plug
- Sorce and Smoxz – Spank Pod
- Young & Sexy – Life Through One Speaker
- Robert Cote Jr. – Lay Me Down
- Milosh – It's Over

=== Episode 4: Feed The Need ===
- Elliot Lipp – Flashlight
- Datarock – The Most Beautiful Girl In The World
- Bonobo – Transmission 94
- Panurge – Listen To Your Own

=== Episode 5: Crappy Birthday to You ===
- Pointed Sticks – What Do You Want Me To Do
- Chromeo – My Girl Is Calling Me A Liar
- Ethan's Karaoke Version – All Out Of Love

=== Episode 6: The Hero's Journey ===
- Cold Cut – Man In The Garage
- Fndmntl – Bodega Dub
- Nasty On – You're No Good
- Dream Life Misery – Out Of Nowhere
- Mr. Scruff – Sea Mammal
- Sons Of Freedom – You're No Good
- Cassettes Won't Listen – The Sidewalk Cruise
- When In Rome – The Promise
- The Seams – Things Are Gonna Get Worse

=== Episode 7: SpriteQuest ===
- Bonobo – Walk In The Sky
- Elliot Lipp – Neutral
- Bonobo feat. Fink – If You Stayed Over
- Datarock – Night Flight To Uranus
- Cassettes Won't Listen – To Have A Crush
- Sorce – Breakin' Ass
- Telefon Tel Aviv – John Thomas On The Inside Is Nothing But Foam

=== Episode 8: The Last Shot ===
- Bonobo – Noctuary
- The Dragons – Sandman
- Fndmntl – Camouflage
- Stars – What The Snowman Learned About Love
- Remy Shand – Everlasting
- Stars – Elevator Love Letter

=== Episode 9: Fine China ===
- The Payolas – China Boys
- Agoria – Baboul Hair Cutton' feat. Scalde
- Fink – If Only

=== Episode 10: The Betty and Veronica Syndrome ===
- Fndmntl – Buttergroove
- Bonobo – Ketto
- Fink – Pretty Little Thing

=== Episode 11: Senseless Prom Death ===
- Fndmntl – Buttergroove
- Steve Rio – Shine On Me
- Fndmntl – Fireside
- Fndmntl – Minutae5
- Eliot Lipp – Neutral
- Cinematic Orchestra – To Build A Home
- Images In Vogue – Call It Love
- Men Without Hats – The Safety Dance
- Sheriff – When I'm With You
- Payolas – Eyes Of A Stranger
- Neverending White Lights – Always

=== Episode 12: Steve Leaves ===
- Fndmntl – Why
- Bonobo – The Fever
- The Awkward Stage – West Van Girl
- Panurge – Black Box
- Bonobo – Between The Lines
- Tegan & Sara – Back In Your Head

=== Episode 13: Colony Collapse Disorder ===
- Panurge – Le Petit Citrouille
- Echo Pilot – Woob Ray Dub
- Sinewave – A Ton Of Automotons
- Veal – Skid
- Othello 9 – Droan
- Fink – So Long
- Bonobo – The Plug
- Cassettes Won't Listen – To Have A Crush
- Fischerspooner – Emerge
- Telefon Tel Aviv – Sound In A Dark Room
- Honeycut – The Day I Turned To Glass
