= Emilie Ullerup =

Danish actress (born 1984)

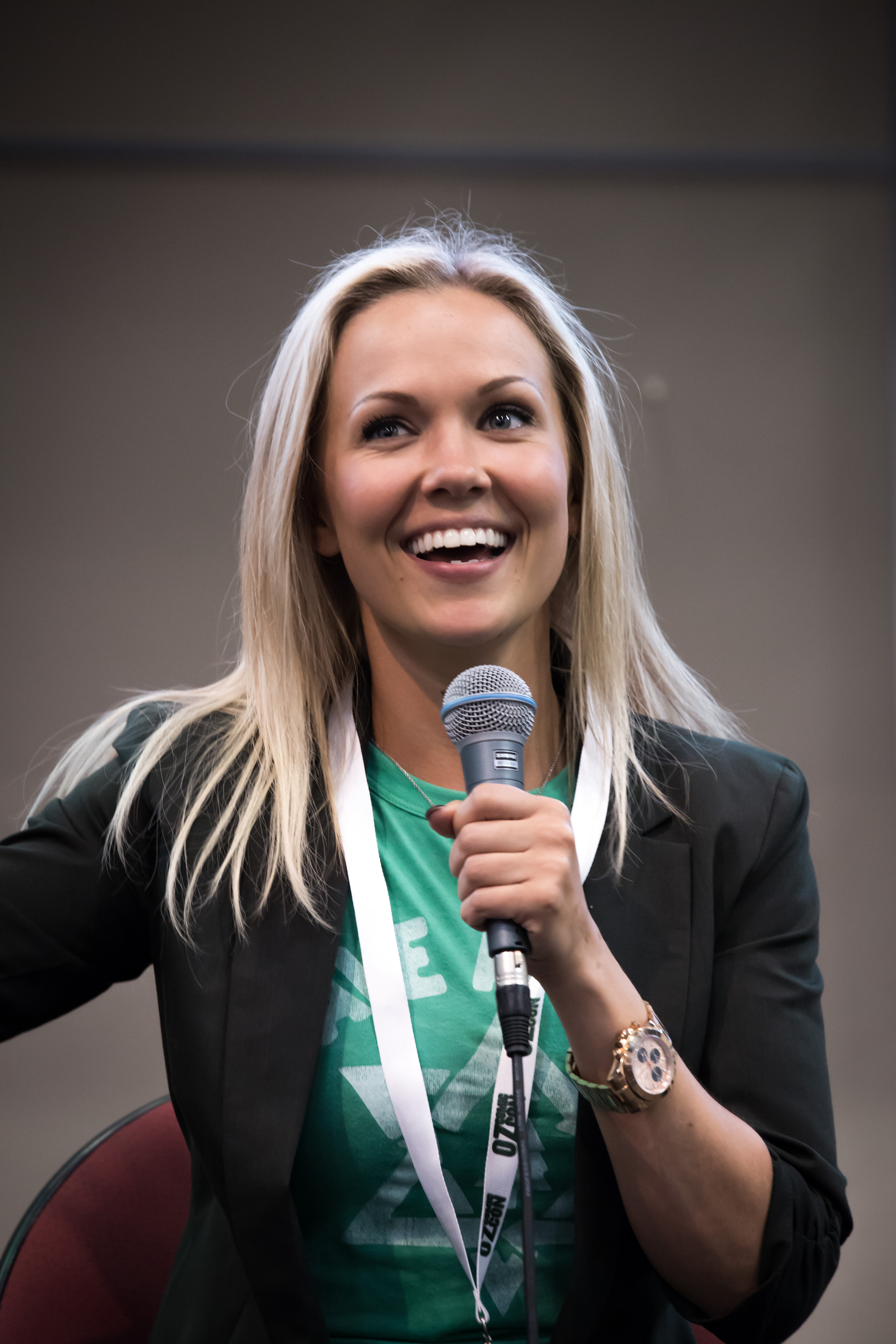
- Ullerup at OzComicCon in 2013
- Born: Emilie Ullerup-Petersen; 27 October 1984 (age 41); Copenhagen, Denmark
- Occupation: Actress
- Years active: 2006–present
- Spouse: Kyle Cassie (m. 2018)
- Children: 2

Emilie Ullerup (born 27 October 1984) is a Danish actress. She is best known for playing Ashley Magnus on the television series Sanctuary and Bree O'Brien on the Hallmark Channel drama series Chesapeake Shores.

== Early life and education ==
Ullerup was born in Copenhagen, Denmark. Her father, Ove Ullerup, served as the Danish ambassador to Vietnam when she was a teenager, and as ambassador to Sweden after she had started her acting career. After graduating from high school in Copenhagen in 2003, she moved to Vancouver, Lower Mainland, British Columbia, and attended the Vancouver Film School, graduating in 2005.

== Career ==
Ullerup's first role was that of Julia Brynn on the remake television series of Battlestar Galactica in 2006, which aired on the Sci Fi Channel. She played Ashley Magnus in the first and second seasons of the television show Sanctuary until her character was written out. Her departure remained a topic of heated debate among fans, with many of them wanting her brought back in future episodes, until the show was canceled in 2012.

In 2016, Ullerup was cast as Bree O'Brien in Chesapeake Shores. Ullerup played Maggie Thomas, the estranged wife of Michael Thomas, in the disaster movie Asteroid: Final Impact (2015). Since 2016 Ullerup has had a recurring role as Dale Travers in Hallmark's Signed, Sealed, Delivered movies series. She played Katie Ryan in Love and Glamping in 2020.

In 2024, Ullerup starred in the Lifetime film Mormon Mom Gone Wrong: The Ruby Franke Story as part of its "Ripped from the Headlines" feature films where she portrayed Ruby Franke. She also appeared in the Hallmark Channel’s Retreat to You in the same year. In 2026, she reunited with her Hearts of Christmas co-star Kristoffer Polaha for the Hallmark Channel movie Missing the Boat.

== Personal life ==
Ullerup speaks Danish, English and Vietnamese – which she learned while her father was the Danish ambassador to Vietnam. Her father later held the title of Lord Chamberlain for the Danish royal family.

In 2008, she was found to have a benign but aggressive tumor wrapped around her spinal nerves. She underwent surgery to remove the tumor in 2009, at which time her coccyx and half of the sacrum of her pelvis were removed. After about five months, she recovered enough to return to work.

On 14 August 2018, she married her longtime boyfriend actor Kyle Cassie. In 2020, they had a son, and in 2022, they had a daughter.

== Filmography ==
=== Film ===
Year	Title	Role	Notes
2010	Hunt to Kill	Dominika	Direct-to-video film
2011	Complexity	Clara Belmont	
2011	The House	Liz Carrington	
2012	A Little Bit Zombie	Penelope Pendleton	
2013	Step Dogs	Sabrina	
2014	Death Do Us Part	Emily Hawkins	
2014	Leprechaun: Origins	Catherine	
2015	The Blackburn Asylum	Chelsea	
2016	True Memoirs of an International Assassin	Stephanie	
2022	Brazen	Kathleen/Desiree	
2023	Assassin's Fury	Michelle Moretti/Shadow	

=== Television ===
Year	Title	Role	Notes
2006	Battlestar Galactica	Julia	Episodes: "Exodus: Part 2", "Torn"
2007	Blood Ties	Sandra	Episodes: "Blood Price: Parts 1 & 2"
2008	jPod	Kaitlin Joyce	Main cast
2008–2010	Sanctuary	Ashley Magnus	Main cast
2009	Smallville	Catherine Grant	Episode: "Crossfire"
2009–2010	Riese: Kingdom Falling	Aliza	Web series
2010	Concrete Canyons	Maggie	TV movie
2011	Mr. Young	Sidney Finkelbaum	Episode: "Mr. Younger Man"
2011	Supernatural	Mia	Episode: "Defending Your Life"
2011	True Justice	Angelina	Episode: "Black Magic"
2012	True Justice	Anna Zemenko	Recurring role
2012	Witchslayer Gretl	Ehren	TV movie
2012	The Philadelphia Experiment	Molly Gardner	TV movie
2012	The Music Teacher	Dee Dee	TV movie
2012–2014	Arctic Air	Astrid Poulsen	Main cast
2013	Fatal Performance	Leesa Thomas	TV movie
2014	Almost Human	Sarah Courtney	Episode: "Beholder"
2014	Signed, Sealed, Delivered	Present Day Dr. Marie Moore	Episode: "Soulmates"
2014	Package Deal	Chelsea	Episode: "Two Half Men"
2015	Asteroid: Final Impact	Maggie Thomas	TV movie
2016–2022	Chesapeake Shores	Bree O'Brien	Main cast
2016	Signed, Sealed, Delivered: From the Heart	Dale Travers	TV movie
2016	Signed, Sealed, Delivered: One in a Million	Dale Travers	TV movie
2016	Signed, Sealed, Delivered: Lost Without You	Dale Travers	TV movie
2016	Hearts of Christmas	Jenny Miller	TV movie
2017	Sleepwalking in Suburbia	Michelle Miller	TV movie
2017	Signed, Sealed, Delivered: Home Again	Dale Travers	TV movie
2017	With Love, Christmas	Melanie	TV movie
2018	Christmas Bells are Ringing	Samantha	TV movie
2019	Stalked by My Doctor: A Sleepwalker's Nightmare	Michelle Miller	TV movie
2019	Winter Castle	Jenny	TV movie
2020	Nature of Love	Katie	TV movie
2022	Don't Forget I Love You	Taylor	TV movie
2022	Motherland: Fort Salem	Kara Brandt	Recurring role
2023	Retreat to You	Abby	TV movie
2024	Mormon Mom Gone Wrong: The Ruby Franke Story	Ruby Franke	TV movie
2024	Abracadabra and the Christmas Miracle	Ally	TV movie
2026	Missing the Boat	Kelly	TV movie
2026	Neagley	Annika	Recurring Role

== Awards ==
- 2008 Leo Award – Best Lead Performance by a Female in a Drama Series for her role as Kaitlin Joyce on JPod

== Nominations ==
- 2012 Leo Award - Best Supporting Performance by a Female in a Dramatic Series (Arctic Air)
- 2013 Leo Award - Best Supporting Performance by a Female in a Dramatic Series (Arctic Air)
- 2013 Leo Award - Best Supporting Performance by a Female in a Motion Picture (Death Do Us Part)
- 2013 UBCP/ACTRA Awards - Best Actress (Arctic Air)
