= Liana Aghajanian =

Armenian-American journalist

Liana Aghajanian is an Armenian-American journalist. She specializes in longform, narrative story telling and international reporting. Aghajanian was born in Tehran, Iran and raised in Los Angeles, California. Currently she lives and writes in Los Angeles, California.

== Journalism ==
Aghajanian's work has appeared in The New York Times, BBC, The Guardian, Newsweek, Foreign Policy and Al Jazeera America. She is also the editor of the independent Armenian news magazine, Ianyan.

Aghajanian has also reported extensively in Armenia, and from several countries such as UK, Germany and Mongolia. She has received a number of fellowships and grants such as the Metlife Foundation Journalists in Aging Fellowship, International Reporting Project at Johns Hopkins University and the Hrant Dink Foundation’s fellowship for Turkish-Armenian dialogue.

== Awards ==
In 2015, Aghajanian was awarded the second Write a House permanent writing residency.
