= JPod =

2006 novel by Douglas Coupland

- Author: Douglas Coupland
- Cover artist: Will Webb
- Language: English
- Genre: Epistolary, satire
- Publisher: Random House of Canada (first edition); Bloomsbury USA (first edition)
- Publication date: 9 May 2006
- Publication place: Canada
- Media type: Print (Hardback & paperback)
- Pages: 528 (Canadian Hardback), 448 (USA hardback)
- ISBN: 0-679-31424-5 (first edition, Canadian hardback); ISBN 1-59691-233-2 (first edition, USA hardback)
- OCLC: 61864559
- Preceded by: Eleanor Rigby
- Followed by: The Gum Thief

JPod is a novel by Douglas Coupland published by Random House of Canada in 2006. Set in 2005, the book explores the strange and unconventional everyday life of the main character, Ethan Jarlewski, and his team of video game programmers whose last names all begin with the letter 'J'.

JPod was adapted into a CBC television series of the same name co-created by Douglas Coupland and Michael MacLennan. It premiered on January 8, 2008, and ran until its cancellation on March 7, 2008, leaving the series with a permanent cliffhanger. The first thirteen episodes of the series aired in the United States on The CW.

== Plot ==
JPod is an avant-garde novel of six young adults, whose last names all begin with the letter 'J' and who are assigned to the same cubicle pod by someone in human resources through a computer glitch, working at Neotronic Arts, a fictional Burnaby-based video game company. Ethan Jarlewski is the novel's main character and narrator, who spends more time involved with his work than with his dysfunctional family. His stay-at-home mother runs a successful marijuana grow-op which allows his father to abandon his career and work as a futile movie extra. Ethan's realtor brother Greg involves himself with Asian crime lord Kam Fong who serves as the plot's crux of character connection.

The JPod staff are required to insert a turtle character based on Jeff Probst into the skateboard game that they are developing as 'BoardX'. The marketing manager, Steven Lefkowitz, mandates the turtle's addition to the game, much to the team's chagrin, to please his son during a custody battle. "JPod" is then drastically challenged and changed when Steve goes missing and the new executive replacement declares further deeply unpopular changes to the game, including changing Jeff the turtle into an adventurous prince who rides a magic carpet, and renaming it "SpriteQuest". The JPodders, upset that they would not be able to finish their game, decide to sabotage SpriteQuest by inserting a deranged Ronald McDonald-inspired character into a secret level where Ronald works malevolence, thus creating a culturally-suitable game for the target market.

Ethan begins to date the newest addition to JPod, Kaitlin, and their relationship grows as she discovers that most of the members of the team, including herself, are mildly autistic. Kaitlin develops a hugging machine after researching how autistic people enjoy the sensation of pressure from non-living things on their skin.

Douglas Coupland, as a character, is inserted into the novel when Ethan visits China to bring a heroin-addicted Steve back to Canada. This Google-version of Douglas Coupland consistently bumps into Ethan and manages to weave himself into the narrator's life. JPod finds itself in a digital world where technology is everything and the human mind is incapable of focusing on just one task.

== Related works and influences ==
- BookShorts; a short video film depicting characters of JPod was filmed in 2006 by BookShorts.com project with support from Random House Canada.
- Microserfs; JPod has been described frequently as an updating of Coupland's 1995 novel Microserfs for the 2000s. Publishers Weekly even called JPod "Microserfs 2.0". Both novels centre around a group of eccentric young programming professionals. Both books are narrated by a young male (Ethan Jarlewski in JPod, Daniel Underwood in Microserfs). Both of these characters write the novel manuscript on a laptop, and both novels feature random product names, slogans, and messages in varying font size. In Microserfs, Daniel types in these random messages in an attempt to tap into his computer's subconscious, while in JPod, the messages reflect the stream of messages, and consciousness, that computer users experience every day. The narrator in both novels also begins and maintains a relationship with a female co-worker; Daniel dates Karla and Ethan dates Kaitlin. Both novels also deal heavily with lifestyle in the modern age of technology. In addition, the characters in both novels are introduced by the narrator through a piece of pop culture: in Microserfs, Daniel lists his co-workers' dream categories in a game of Jeopardy! and in JPod, Ethan asks his co-workers to design an eBay page for themselves. Finally, both novels touch on autism, a condition Coupland has himself. In Microserfs, Daniel says that he thinks that all tech people are autistic, and in JPod, Kaitlin describes all of her co-workers and her boss as mildly autistic. Hugging machines as described in the novel have actually been developed to help those with autism.
- Sitcoms; JPod was called by one reviewer "a 448 page sitcom". The style of humour is very similar to that of sitcoms, and especially of Arrested Development. The humour mostly originates from character flaws. The characters themselves do not have much depth, and their flaws are exaggerated for comic effect. For example, John Doe is obsessed with being an 'average person' and many of his actions result from this singular character trait.
- Terry; Terry is Douglas Coupland's pictorial biography of Terry Fox, written to commemorate the 25th anniversary of Terry's 1981 death and published in 2005. Coupland was writing both Terry and JPod simultaneously, and Coupland was quoted in the Jerusalem Post saying that all of his "more noble character traits went into [Terry]. There was a tar-pit of ooze left over that wanted to go somewhere. JPod was it." This helps to explain the malicious version of Douglas Coupland (Anti-Doug) who appears in the novel.
- Epistolary novels; Parts of the text of JPod are written as e-mails, text messages, and other messages written by the characters themselves. Therefore, JPod can be considered partly an epistolary novel; however, much of the novel is also standard narrative format.
- Self-insertion; JPod makes extensive use of the literary device of self-insertion, in which the author himself appears as a character. Other examples of this technique appear in The Canterbury Tales, The Divine Comedy, and numerous other fictional works.
- Video gaming; JPod draws similarities to several real-life elements of the video gaming world. For example, the company that the characters work at is called Neotronic Arts, which is extremely similar to the real company Electronic Arts. Besides the similarity in the name, both video game companies have their main office in Burnaby, close to the freeway, and both deal heavily in sports games.
- TV series; A TV series based on the novel was produced by CBC and began airing in January 2008. The show starred David Kopp, Emilie Ullerup, Ben Ayres, Steph Song, Torrance Coombs, Colin Cunningham, Sherry Miller, and Alan Thicke. Six of the episodes were written or co-written by Douglas Coupland. The show began airing on Tuesday nights, but because of low ratings it was moved to Friday nights. The continued low ratings resulted in CBC announcing the cancellation of the series in March 2008, despite the fan-based protest that this sparked. A total of 13 episodes were produced. The executive producer of the series, Larry Sugar, blamed CBC for the cancellation, saying that they had not done enough to promote the show.

== Reception ==
JPod has been received with mixed reception from literary critics. Some felt it is just an unsuccessful update of Microserfs, with no added substance, while others enjoyed its entertaining style and satire.

=== Favourable ===
Favourable reviews of JPod largely focus on its entertaining qualities arising from the improbable-probable lives and quirks of the characters. As a Post-Gutenberg novel, JPod is recognized for reflecting the fragmented state of a technology saturated generation, illustrating the stereotype of current generations being unable to concentrate on one item or task for more than a few seconds.

John Elk's review of JPod comments on the novel being an affirmative updating of Coupland's previous Microserfs, for the "Google generation". Coupland is mentioned as being "possibly the most gifted exegete of North American mass culture writing today", with JPod being "his strongest, best-observed novel since Microserfs." JPod is described as an engaging book, with bizarre characters and devices making it "definitely worth the read" and while it is "not fully satisfying, it is entertaining".

Another review of JPod describes how the fragmentation of the book relates to the autistic characteristics of the characters. The book is about employees in technology and video game generation, who "paradoxically have superhuman powers on concentration, yet can't seem to focus on anything". This message is brought up throughout the book, which tends to provoke the reader to really think about the effects of technology on our society.

=== Unfavourable ===
On the other hand, many critics were frustrated and irritated by the book. Dennis Lim of The Village Voice called it "smug, vacuous, easily distracted, and often supremely irritating". He did note, however, that this "may be purposeful, but it's not in service of a meaningful larger point—unless you count the unmissable observation that too much information is, like, overwhelming". John Elk said that Coupland "is neither a master of plot nor of characterization", and his characters were also called "hollowed-out cartoons".

Coupland was further criticized by critics like David Daley of USA Today, who wrote that "subtlety still eludes Coupland" and that his "relentless riffing can be exhausting". The 41 pages spent listing digits of pi, for example, were found by many to be pointless and, as Patrick Ness noted, "lazily assembled". As well, many critics found that Coupland's appearance as a character was annoying, "narcissistic" and "an obvious and sort of sad attempt to turn [himself] into a cultural icon". Other critics wondered if Coupland simply inserted himself because he didn't know how else to end the novel.
