= Miranda Cosgrove discography =

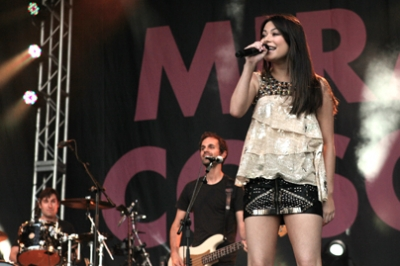
- Cosgrove in the Dancing Crazy Tour in 2012
- Studio albums: 1
- Extended plays: 2
- Singles: 4
- Music videos: 8
- Promotional singles: 8

American singer and actress Miranda Cosgrove has released one studio album, two extended plays, four singles, and eight promotional singles. Cosgrove's debut as a recording artist began with the iCarly theme song "Leave It All to Me". The song features Drake Bell was released as a single in 2007 and peaked at number 100 on the Billboard Hot 100.

In June 2008, Nickelodeon and Columbia Records released the iCarly soundtrack, which featured four songs performed by Cosgrove. In December 2008, a cover of the holiday song "Christmas Wrapping" was released to promote the hour-long special Merry Christmas, Drake & Josh. On February 3, 2009, Cosgrove released her first solo recording, the extended play About You Now, exclusively on the North American iTunes Store. The song of the same title, "About You Now" reached number 47 on the Hot 100 in January 2009, becoming her most successful song to date. To promote the 2009 animated film Cloudy with a Chance of Meatballs, Columbia Records released a promotional single entitled "Raining Sunshine".

Cosgrove released her first studio album, Sparks Fly on April 27, 2010 and peaked at number eight on the US Billboard 200 chart. The album sold 36,000 copies in its first week. The first single from her album, "Kissin U", was released on March 22, 2010, and peaked number 54. In January 2011, Cosgrove revealed that her second EP would be titled High Maintenance, which was eventually released two months later. Its lead single, titled "Dancing Crazy", was written by Avril Lavigne and peaked at number 36 on the US Billboard Mainstream Top 40 chart and 100 on the Hot 100.

== Studio albums ==
List of studio albums, with selected chart positions
Title	Studio album details	Peak chart positions					Sales
Title	Studio album details	US	AUT	GER	MEX	SWI	Sales
Sparks Fly	Released: April 27, 2010; Formats: CD, digital download, streaming; Label: Nickelodeon, Columbia	8	46	96	84	35	US: 209,000 (Note: Sales of Sparks Fly in the United States as of August 11, 2011.)

== Extended plays ==
List of extended plays, with selected chart positions
Title	Extended plays details	Peak chart positions	Sales
Title	Extended plays details	US	Sales
About You Now	Released: February 3, 2009; Format: Digital download, streaming; Label: Nickelodeon, Columbia	—	
High Maintenance	Released: March 15, 2011; Formats: CD, digital download, streaming; Label: Nickelodeon, Columbia	34	US: 11,000 (Note: Sales of High Maintenance in the United States as of March 23, 2011.)
"—" denotes items which did not chart in that country.

== Singles ==
List of singles, with selected chart positions and certifications, showing year released and album name
Title	Year	Peak chart positions									Sales	Certifications	Album
Title	Year	US	US Adult	US Pop	US Pop 100	AUT	CAN CHR	CAN Hot AC	GER	JPN Hot	Sales	Certifications	Album
"Leave It All to Me" (featuring Drake Bell)	2007	100	—	—	83	—	—	—	—	—	US: 355,000 (Note: Sales of "Leave It All to Me" in the United States as of April 24, 2010.)		iCarly
"About You Now"	2009	47	—	—	—	—	—	—	—	—	US: 74,000 (Note: Sales of "About You Now" in the United States as of January 1, 2009.)		About You Now
"Kissin U"	2010	54	36	19	*	51	37	48	67	—		RIAA: Gold	Sparks Fly
"Dancing Crazy"	2010	100	—	36	*	—	—	—	—	56			High Maintenance
"—" denotes items which did not chart in that country. "*" denotes the chart is discontinued.

=== Promotional singles ===
List of promotional singles, with selected chart positions, showing year released and album name
Title	Year	Peak chart positions		Album
Title	Year	US Bub.	US Kid	Album
"Stay My Baby"	2008	—	—	iCarly
"Christmas Wrapping"	2008	—	—	Non-album single
"Raining Sunshine"	2009	—	—	Cloudy with a Chance of Meatballs
"Daydream"	2011	—	—	Sparks Fly
"Disgusting"	2011	—	—	Sparks Fly
"Leave It All to Shine" (iCarly and Victorious casts featuring Miranda Cosgrove and Victoria Justice)	2011	24	2	Victorious: Music from the Hit TV Show
"All Kinds of Wrong"	2012	—	—	iCarly: iSoundtrack II
"Million Dollars"	2012	—	—	iCarly: iSoundtrack II
"—" denotes items which did not chart in that country.

== Other appearances ==
List of non-single appearances, showing year released and album name
Title	Year	Album
"Headphones On"	2008	iCarly

== Music videos ==
List of music videos, showing year released, other artists featured and directors
Title	Year	Other artist(s)	Director(s)	Ref.
As lead artist
"Leave It All to Me"	2008	Drake Bell	Dan Schneider	
"Stay My Baby"	2008	None	Jesse Dylan	
"About You Now"	2008	None	Bille Woodruff	
"Raining Sunshine"	2009	None	Erik White	
"Kissin U"	2010	None	Alan Ferguson	
"Dancing Crazy"	2011	None	Kenneth Montas	
"High Maintenance"	2011	Rivers Cuomo	Unknown	
As featured artist
"Leave It All to Shine"	2011	iCarly and Victorious casts Victoria Justice	Unknown	
Guest appearances
"Our Deal"	2011	Best Coast	Drew Barrymore	
"Happy"	2013	Pharrell Williams	We Are from LA; Yoann Lemoine	
"Happier"	2018	Marshmello	Mercedes Bryce Morgan	

== See also ==
- List of awards and nominations received by Miranda Cosgrove
