= High Maintenance (disambiguation) =

High Maintenance is an American television and web series that premiered in 2012.

High Maintenance may also refer to:

- High Maintenance (Miranda Cosgrove EP), 2011
- High Maintenance (Saweetie EP), 2018
- "High Maintenance" (song), a 2011 song by Miranda Cosgrove
- "High Maintenance", a song by Meli'sa Morgan from the album I Remember, 2005
- High Maintenance, a 2001 novel by Jennifer Belle
- High Maintenance, a 2006 film shown at the 56th Berlin International Film Festival
