= List of awards and nominations received by Miranda Cosgrove =

Miranda Cosgrove awards and nominations
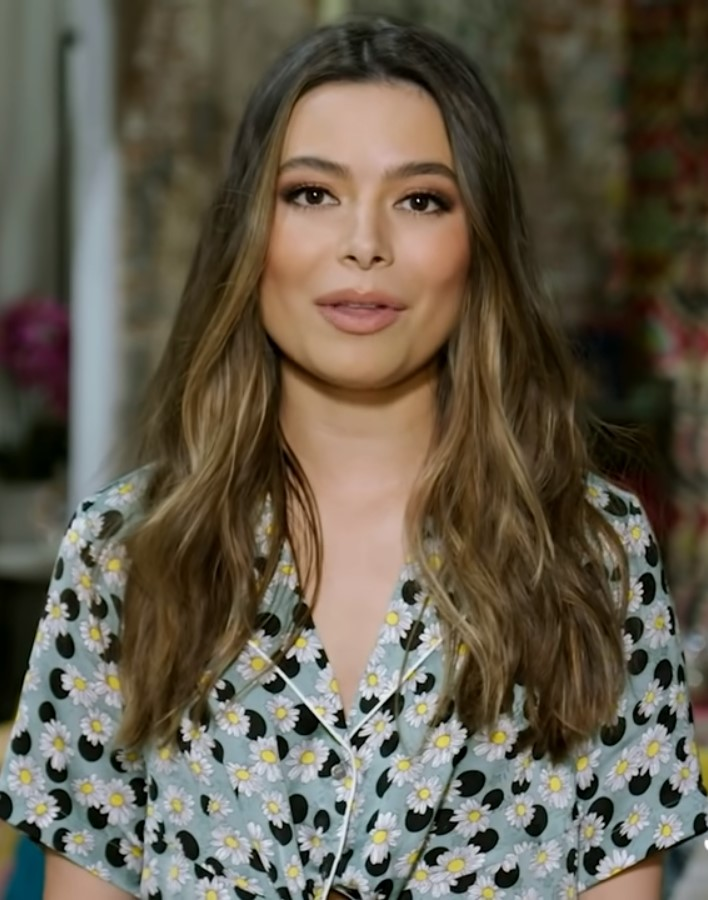
- Cosgrove in 2021
Awards and nominations
Award	Wins	Nominations
Daytime Emmy Awards	0	1
Gracie Allen Awards	1	1
Kids' Choice Awards	3	6
Teen Choice Awards	1	6
Young Artist Awards	2	10

Totals (Note: Certain award groups do not simply award one winner. They acknowledge several different recipients, have runners-up, and have third place. Since this is a specific recognition and is different from losing an award, runner-up mentions are considered wins in this award tally. For simplification and to avoid errors, each award in this list has been presumed to have had a prior nomination.)
- Wins: 13
- Nominations: 47

Miranda Cosgrove is an American actress and singer. Her career began at the age of three, when she appeared in television commercials. Her film debut came in 2003, when she played Summer Hathaway in School of Rock. She appeared in a number of minor television roles over several years before coming to prominence as Megan Parker on the Nickelodeon TV series Drake & Josh. A few years later, she landed the role of Carly Shay, the lead character in the Nickelodeon TV series iCarly.

As of May 2010, Cosgrove earned $180,000 per episode of iCarly, making her the second-highest-paid child star on television. She was listed in the 2012 edition of Guinness World Records as the highest paid child actress for iCarly. Following the success of iCarly, a soundtrack album was released in June 2008, in which she performed four songs. Her debut album, Sparks Fly, was released on April 27, 2010.

== Alliance of Women Film Journalists ==
Year	Category	Work	Result	Ref.
2011	Best Animated Female	Despicable Me	Won	

== Capricho Awards ==
Year	Category	Work	Result	Ref.
2011	Best International Actress	iCarly	Nominated	
2011	Best International Singer	Herself	Nominated	
2011	Best Style	Herself	Nominated	
2011	Best International Song	"Kissin U"	Nominated	
2011	Best International Music Video	"Kissin U"	Nominated	

== Common Sense Media Awards ==
Year	Category	Work	Result	Ref.
2011	Best Example to the Youth	Herself	Won	

== Daytime Emmy Awards ==
Year	Category	Work	Result	Ref.
2020	Outstanding Educational or Informational Series	Mission Unstoppable with Miranda Cosgrove	Nominated	

== Gracie Allen Awards ==
Year	Category	Work	Result	Ref.
2011	Outstanding Female Rising Star in a Comedy	iCarly	Won	

== Hollywood Teen TV Awards ==
Year	Category	Work	Result	Ref.
2012	Favorite Television Actress	iCarly	Nominated	

== MTV Awards ==
=== MTV Movie Awards ===
Year	Category	Work	Result	Ref.
2004	Best On-Screen Team	School of Rock	Nominated	

== Nickelodeon Awards ==
=== Australian Kids' Choice Awards ===
Year	Category	Work	Result	Ref.
2008	Fave International TV Star	iCarly	Nominated	
2009	Fave International TV Star	iCarly	Nominated	
2009	So Hot Right Now	Herself	Nominated	
2010	Fave TV Star	iCarly	Nominated	
2010	LOL Award	Herself	Won	
2011	Fave TV Star	iCarly	Nominated	

=== Kids' Choice Awards ===
Year	Category	Work	Result	Ref.
2009	Favorite TV Actress	iCarly	Nominated	
2010	Favorite TV Actress	iCarly	Nominated	
2011	Favorite TV Actress	iCarly	Nominated	
2012	Favorite TV Actress	iCarly	Nominated	
2013	Favorite TV Actress	iCarly	Nominated	
2014	Favorite Voice from an Animated Movie	Despicable Me 2	Won	
2022	Favorite Female TV Star (Family)	iCarly	Won	
2023	Favorite Female TV Star (Family)	iCarly	Nominated	
2024	Favorite Female TV Star (Family)	iCarly	Won	

=== Kids' Choice Awards Mexico ===
Year	Category	Work	Result	Ref.
2010	Favorite International Character Female	iCarly	Won	

=== Meus Prêmios Nick (Brazil) ===
Year	Category	Work	Result	Ref.
2010	Favorite International Artist	iCarly	Nominated	
2013	Favorite International Artist	iCarly	Won	

=== UK Kids' Choice Awards ===
Year	Category	Work	Result	Ref.
2008	Favorite Female TV Star	iCarly	Nominated	

== Ology Awards ==
Year	Category	Work	Result	Ref.
2012	Best Rising Female Star	iCarly	Won	

== People's Choice Awards ==
Year	Category	Work	Result	Ref.
2011	Favorite Family TV Movie Star	Despicable Me	Nominated	

== Teen Choice Awards ==
Year	Category	Work	Result	Ref.
2009	Choice TV Actress: Comedy	iCarly	Nominated	
2010	Choice TV Actress: Comedy	iCarly	Nominated	
2010	Choice Smile	Herself	Nominated	
2010	Choice Music: Breakout Artist – Female	iCarly	Nominated	
2011	Choice TV Actress: Comedy	iCarly	Nominated	
2012	Choice TV Actress: Comedy	iCarly	Nominated	
2012	Acuvue Inspire Award	Herself	Won	

== Young Artist Awards ==
Year	Category	Work	Result	Ref.
2004	Best Young Ensemble in a Feature Film	School of Rock	Nominated	
2006	Best Performance in a Feature Film – Young Ensemble Cast	Yours, Mine and Ours	Nominated	
2007	Best Performance in a TV Series (Comedy or Drama) – Supporting Young Actress	Drake & Josh	Nominated	
2008	Best Performance in a TV Series – Leading Young Actress	iCarly	Nominated	
2009	Best Performance in a TV Series (Comedy or Drama) – Leading Young Actress	iCarly	Won	
2009	Outstanding Young Performers in a TV Series	iCarly	Nominated	
2010	Best Performance in a TV Series (Comedy or Drama) – Leading Young Actress	iCarly	Nominated	
2010	Outstanding Young Performers in a TV Series	iCarly	Nominated	
2011	Best Performance in a TV Series (Comedy or Drama) – Leading Young Actress	iCarly	Nominated	
2012	Best Performance in a Cross-Over	iCarly	Won	

== See also ==
- Miranda Cosgrove discography
