= Shuriken School =

Television series

- From left to right: Okuni, Eizan, Jimmy
- Genre: Coming-of-age; Martial arts comedy
- Created by: Emilio Gallego; Jesùs Gallego
- Developed by: Pascal Morelli
- Directed by: Pascal Morelli
- Starring: French; Hélène Bizot; Sophie Arthuys; Emilie Rault; Pierre Baton; Patricia Legrand; Sauvane Delanoë; Isabelle Volpe; Stéphanie Lafforge; Ariane Aggiage; Bruno Magne; Denis Laustriat; Philippe Valmont; Jean-Claude Donda; Brigitte Lecordier; Benjamin Pascal; Pascal Massix; English; Nathan Kress; Charlie Adler; Jessica DiCicco; Kimberly Brooks; Maurice LaMarche
- Music by: Hervé Lavandier
- Countries of origin: Spain; France
- Original languages: Spanish; French; English
- No. of episodes: 26

Production
- Executive producer: Marc du Pontavice
- Producers: Marc du Pontavice; José Maria Castillejo
- Running time: 23 minutes
- Production companies: Xilam Animation; Zinkia Entertainment

Original release
- Network: France 3 (France); Jetix (Europe)
- Release: August 20, 2006 – December 21, 2007

Shuriken School is an animated television series that first aired on August 20, 2006. It was produced by Xilam Animation and Zinkia Entertainment (known for producing Pocoyo) in association with France 3 and Jetix Europe.

== Characters ==
=== Main ===
- Eizan Kaburagi (voiced by Nathan Kress) is a 10-year-old ninja student of Shuriken. Eizan is intelligent, hardworking, and eager to learn. His dream since childhood is to become a ninja. It is hinted that he has a crush on Okuni and also has a rivalry with Naginata. His weapon is a green plastic ruler. He is also clumsy as shown in the episode "Phantom of the Kabuki".
- Okuni Dohan (voiced by Jessica DiCicco) is a 11-year-old ninja student of Shuriken, and the only female member of the main group, also the most studious of them. She frequently cites examples from important lessons, and possesses great deductive skills and origami talent, and her weapon is a jump rope. She also has quite a short fuse, and has a crush on Eizan. There is a rivalry between Okuni and the Kimura Twins from Katana.
- Jimmy B (voiced by Kimberly Brooks) is an 11-year-old ninja student of Shuriken. Jimmy comes from a comfortable New York family, but spent his time with his rap gang, developing a real talent for break-dancing. His parents sent him to Tokirohama to stay with his aunt and uncle. Before coming to Shuriken, he went to Katana School, but was expelled after a week. His weapon is a skateboard.
- Nobunaga (voiced by Brooks): He comes from a long line of skilled sumo wrestlers, and dresses accordingly. He is fairly well respected among his peers, and his size and strength make him a formidable opponent. He appears as a fat boy with a large belly spilling over his mawashi. His girth makes him slow, but he trained to be agile enough to keep up with his peers. He was named after the Sengoku warlord, Oda Nobunaga.
- Tetsuo Matsura (voiced by Charlie Adler): A bitter second-year student who looks down on all freshmen with disdain. He is a powerful and skilled ninja, but his anger keeps him from advancing further. This, combined with his great height, may mean that he has been held back for an unspecified amount of time. Constantly following him is his mindless lackey, Yota. He may be named after Tetsuo Shima from Akira.
- Yota Sugimura (voiced by Jessica DiCicco): Tetsuo's very short and ever-present lackey, following him about like a remora follows a shark. He has little personality of his own, often inheriting the personality of the person he is with. He is extremely clumsy, but ironically is good at sneaking.
- Ami Saeki (voiced by Jessica DiCicco): A blonde young girl with long hair who wears a sailor fuku-type uniform and a red bow on the back of her head. She is very vain, constantly obsessing over her appearance. However, her pampered looks conceal a great aptitude for disguise and deception. She has a crush on Jimmy B. which is implied in the episode, "Flip Flops of Fury". Daisuke seems to like her quite a lot; however, she does not return the feeling (though she did kiss him once in "Phantom of the Kabuki"). She was initially one of the students selected to go to the cheerleading school, but she gave her ticket to Okuni. She bears a resemblance to Minako Aino, and her first name may derive from Ami Mizuno, both from the Sailor Moon franchise.
- Marcos Gonzalez (voiced by Nathan Kress): A Latin-American student who came to Shuriken School to hide from a vicious group, called the 3-Saints Gang, from Mexico. It turned out that he ran to Shuriken because he saw them with their masks off. Thinking they were after him, he hid in the aforementioned school. It was revealed in the episode "An XXL Lie" that they abandoned their masks to become Midwestern singers, making his whole escape humorously pointless. He is very sly and mysterious, and he wears sunglasses in order to hide his face. He excels in covert strikes, and possesses all-around good skills in other fields as well.
- Jacques Morimura (voiced by Nathan Kress): A rather confused young, French man who believes Shuriken School is a diving school, due to the similarities between the uniforms. He dresses in a black scuba suit, reminiscent of Jacques Cousteau, whom he may be named after. His specialty is underwater combat.
- Choki (voiced by Kress): A Tibetan monk who possesses the powers of telepathy and psychokinesis. He spends most of his time asleep or meditating, and has a very easy-going personality. Most of the time, he prefers floating over walking.
- Daisuke Togakame (voiced by Maurice LaMarche): An arrogant student who cares more about his hair than his studies, Daisuke is a known coward, and is quick to run from a fight. However, he is not completely useless; his nimble fingers make him a very good tailor. He has a crush on Ami, constantly hitting on her and trying to randomly kiss her in almost every episode he appears in. In the episode "An XXL Lie", it is shown that he genuinely likes Ami. In the episode "Eizan's Shadow", Daisuke is seen not washing his hands after using the bathroom, suggesting poor hygiene habits.
- Pork: Pork is, perhaps, the most mysterious of all the Shuriken School students. He appears to be an anthropomorphic pig, and is apparently mute (except for a small grunt in "An XXL Lie"). He communicates via musical instruments, which he is proficient in using. He is also very good at detecting the purpose and personality of disguised and supernatural enemies such as in the episodes "Funny Chick" and "The Demon and Mrs. Clean" respectively, where he detects that the Chick has foul purposes and tries to get the group to stop it, and that the demon messing up the place is really a possessed Mrs. Clean; thus he is not afraid of it unlike the others, but rather enjoys the actions of the former. These actions imply that in place of speech, he has been granted clairvoyance. He is shown to have mind control powers in one episode. He seems to have an interest in art.
- Principal of Shuriken (voiced by Charlie Adler): Also called "Principal-sama", the principal is always worried about the school's funding and is also money-obsessed to the point that in the episode "Eizan's Shadow", he actually asked Kazumi's parents to put the withdrawn check on the phone so he could talk to it. However, he does have exceedingly good ninjitsu skills that made him the principal. He usually has a positive thinking in many situation. He has an allergy to animals.
- Vladmir Keitawa (voiced by Charlie Adler): One of the three teachers at Shuriken School. He has a comically long middle name. According to himself in episode "Vlad's Past", his middle name is "Edovich Petrovich Petervich Gochkavich Michkavich Ventravich Pechkavich Pechkavich Vichvich". He comes from Russia, has great physical strength and has a weakness for attractive women. Vlad once pretended to be a foreign exchange student named "Ed" in the episode "Vlad's Past", as it is revealed that although he teaches at Shuriken School, he is not a certified teacher because – due to his massive fear of tests – he did not pass the stealth and evasion course. Eizan and the gang disguise him as an exchange student and help him hide from the inspector, who is after Vlad to expose him. After conquering his fear and fooling Kubo and the inspector, it is proven that he has passed the course, making him a certified "Ninja Teacher".
- Kubo Utamaro (voiced by Maurice LaMarche): One of the three teachers at Shuriken School. Kubo teaches boring theory lessons and has a crush on Kita. He also dreams of being principal one day.
- Kita Shunai (voiced by Jessica DiCicco): One of the three teachers at Shuriken School. She has masterful skills with ninja weapons, contrasted with her fiery temper. She used to be a teacher at Katana School. She is also the only female teacher of Shuriken School.
- Zumichito (voiced by Maurice LaMarche): Shuriken School's groundskeeper. He used to be a student there; thus he knows all of the secrets of the school, and knows a lot of stories about it as well.
- Mrs. Clean (voiced by Charlie Adler): Real name Michiyo, Mrs. Clean is the Shuriken School's cleaning lady. She has spent her whole life around Shuriken School and knows some ninja moves as well. She takes great pride in her work, and if her cleaning is disrupted, she transforms into a terrifying demon.

=== Katana School ===
- Naginata (voiced by Maurice LaMarche): An 11-year-old student of Shuriken's rivaling school, Katana. He is selfish, evil, and a twisted loner, who masters the art of trickery like no other, only using his ninjutsu for the cause of others' misfortune. He and his group sucks up to Katana's principal and usually cheats in battles where he's losing. He is also the only one of his gang that is not afraid of the principal. He has an intense rivalry with Eizan, having lost against him in the episode, "The Winning Ninja".
- Bruce Chang (voiced by Kimberly Brooks): A 10-year-old ninja student of katana and is one of Naginata's loyal followers, Bruce likes getting into fights. He has a bad temper and also a loud mouth, which coincidentally, gets the group into trouble. He has a rivalry with Jimmy B. He is a brave fighter but is very reckless, usually jumping into a battle without a 2nd thought. He sleeps with a teddy bear.
- The Kimura Twins (voiced by Jessica DiCicco): 10-year-old ninja students of katana and are followers of Naginata, they are sneaky and will usually gather information for Naginata. They act tough when they are together but when apart, they weaken. They are also dependent on each other. They are sexist as well, hating Okuni the most.
- Doku: Another one of Naginata's followers, Doku is big and easily outwitted. His mother still brings him lunch every day.
- Principal of Katana (voiced by Charlie Adler): Everyone seems to fear this man. He owns a cute ninja chick that he always keeps by his side named Chirpy Chick, and his face is always covered by an ominous shadow. Naginata and his group suck up to him to earn his favor, and he clearly despises Shuriken and its students. His hairstyle is similar to that of Heihachi Mishima from the Tekken fighting games.

== Voice cast ==
- Nathan Kress - Eizan, Jacques, Choki, Marcos
- Charlie Adler - Vladimir, Principal of Shuriken, Tetsuo, Principal of Katana, Cleaning Lady
- Jessica DiCicco - Okuni, Ami, Kita, Kimura Twins, Yota
- Maurice LaMarche - Daisuke, Naginata, Kubo, Zumichito
- Kimberly Brooks - Jimmy, Nobunaga, Bruce Chang

== Episodes ==
No.	Title	Written by	Storyboarded by	Original release date
1	"The Winning Ninja" "Ninja Gagnant"	Pierre Oliver	Jean-Luc Abiven	August 20, 2006
2	"Catnap Burglar" "Un Voleur à Dormir Debout"	Richard Elliott; Simon Racioppa	Jesùs and Emilio Gallego	August 26, 2006
3	"Eizan's Shadow" "L'ombre d'Eizan"	Story by : Christopher Host; Teleplay by : Mike Ryan	Charles Vaucelle	September 3, 2006
4	"Vlad's Past" "La Passé de Vlad"	Richard Elliott; Simon Racioppa	Jesùs and Emilio Gallego	September 10, 2006
5	"Flip Flop of Fury" "La Furie des Tongs"	Paul Dawson	Pascal Morelli	September 17, 2006
6	"Lousy Labyrinth" "Maudit Labyrinthe"	Jean-Louis Bachellier	Jesùs and Emilio Gallego	September 24, 2006
7	"An XXL Lie" "Un Trop Gros Mensonge"	Story by : Jérôme Erbin; Teleplay by : Jean Pêcheux; Pascal Morelli	Christopher Villez	October 1, 2006
8	"Kubo's Mystery" "Le Secret de Kubo"	Wendell Morris	Jesùs and Emilio Gallego	October 8, 2006
9	"The Demon and Mrs. Clean" "Le Démon"	Story by : Richard Elliott; Simon Racioppa; Teleplay by : Mike Ryan	Jean-Luc Abiven	October 15, 2006
10	"Cherry on the Cake" "Ras Le Pompon!"	Jean Brune; Grégory Chambet	Charles Vaucelle	October 22, 2006
11	"Super Ninja"	Jean-Louis Bachellier	Jean-Luc Abiven	October 29, 2006
12	"Old School Ninjitsu" "Ninja pour Toujours"	Story by : Christopher Host; Teleplay by : Mike Ryan	Jesùs and Emilio Gallego	November 5, 2006
13	"Class Photo" "La Photo de Classe"	Jean Pêcheux	Jean-Pierre Barja	November 12, 2006
14	"The Old Master" "Le Vieux Maître"	Florent Baudry	Pascal Morelli	November 19, 2006
15	"Okuni for President" "Le Chef de Classe"	Wendell Morris	Javier Jerez	November 26, 2006
16	"Funny Chick" "Drôle de Poussin"	Alain Vallejo; Jean Brune	Laurent Salou	March 14, 2007
17	"The Lost Treasure" "Le Trésor Perdu"	Wendell Morris	Jean-Luc Abiven	March 21, 2007
18	"Phantom of the Kabuki" "Le Fantôme du Kabuki"	Mike Ryan	José Maria Guzman	March 28, 2007
19	"The Saber and it's Shadow" "La Sabre et Son Ombre"	Jean Pêcheux	Stéphane Portal	April 4, 2007
20	"Shuriken School Secrets" "Le Secrets de Shuriken"	Jean Brune; Grégory Chambet	Pascal Morelli	April 11, 2007
21	"The Big Illusion" "La Grande Illusion"	Jean-Louis Bachellier	José Maria Guzman	April 18, 2007
22	"Pop Star for a Day" "Pop Star d'un Jour"	Jean Pêcheux; Pascal Morelli	Pascal Morelli	April 25, 2007
23	"The Master of Darkness" "Le Maître des Ténèbres"	Jean Pêcheux; Pascal Morelli	José Maria Guzman	May 2, 2007
24	"Detective Mania" "Détective-Mania"	Jean Pêcheux; Pascal Morelli	Pascal Morelli; Jean-Luc Abiven	May 9, 2007
25	"Eyes Wide Shut" "Les Yeux Fermés"	Mike Ryan	Pascal Morelli	May 23, 2007
26	"Dirty Rice Balls" "Drôles de boulettes"	Wendell Morris	Jean-Luc Abiven	May 30, 2007

== Broadcast ==
The series made its worldwide debut on ITV's CITV block in January 2006. The series premiered in France in July on France 3 and was soon expanded to Jetix networks across Europe, the Middle East and North Africa, alongside Latin America. Other broadcasters that had acquired the series included Nickelodeon and Nicktoons Network in the United States as well as in Australia, Mediaset in Italy, TV2 in Denmark and Disney Channel in Asia.

== Home video ==
In the United States, the entire series was released onto DVD on August 12, 2014, from Cinedigm.

== Movie ==
An animated film, entitled Shuriken School: The Ninja's Secret (also known as The Ninja's Secret: A Shuriken School Adventure), has been produced by Xilam. It was released on DVD in France on 26 September 2007, and aired on 21 December 2007 on Disney Channel Asia. In the US, it was released onto DVD on April 15, 2014, from Cinedigm.

=== Plot ===
The plot of Shuriken: The Movie follows lead protagonists Eizan, Jimmy and Okuni during the summer holidays. The three friends soon engage an interesting albeit dangerous struggle for reputation, family, and a whole lot more when Eizan's dad is kidnapped by professional ninjas. Upon setting out to find and rescue Eizan's father, the kids must employ the skills and techniques they studied so fervently during their first year of ninja training. Things are difficult however, when they learn that the Jade Shuriken, an ancient symbol of extreme ninja power, threatens Eizan's dreams and potential to become a true ninja. A series of events unravel as Eizan strives to clear his name, realize his dreams and secure his place at Shuriken School.

=== Voice cast ===
- Nathan Kress - Eizan
- Charlie Adler - Vladimir, Principal of Shuriken, Tetsuo, Principal of Katana, Eizan's Father
- Jessica DiCicco - Okuni, Ami
- Kimberly Brooks - Jimmy, Nobunaga, Bruce Chang, Eizan's mother
- Maurice LaMarche - Daisuke, Naginata, Kubo, Zumichito
- Billy West (uncredited) - additional voices
