= Gym Teacher: The Movie =

2008 television film by Paul Dinello

- DVD cover
- Written by: Daniel Altiere; Steven Altiere
- Directed by: Paul Dinello
- Starring: Christopher Meloni; Amy Sedaris; David Alan Grier; Nathan Kress
- Music by: Daniel Licht
- Countries of origin: United States; Canada
- Original language: English

Production
- Producer: Scott McAboy
- Cinematography: Attila Szalay
- Editors: David Codron; Cindy Parisotto
- Running time: 103 minutes
- Production companies: Once Upon a Time Films; Pacific Bay Entertainment Canada; Dolphin Entertainment; Nickelodeon Productions
- Budget: $3 million

Original release
- Network: Nickelodeon
- Release: September 12, 2008

Gym Teacher: The Movie is a 2008 sports comedy television film directed by Paul Dinello, starring Christopher Meloni, Amy Sedaris, David Alan Grier, and Nathan Kress. The film premiered on Nickelodeon on September 12, 2008.

== Plot ==
David "Dave" Stewie is a middle school PE teacher who sees a forthcoming award as a way to redeem himself of his greatest regret, a failure to make the 1988 US Olympic Team. Meanwhile, Roland Waffle is a new transfer student who is completely non-athletic and wears a helmet at all times due to his mother worrying he will get hurt. Abigail "Abby" Hoffman is the principal who carries "a Filipino fighting stick" to assault night prowlers lurking after school, and Morgan, Champ and Derrick, who are students of the school.

== Cast ==
- Christopher Meloni as Coach David "Dave" Stewie
- Nathan Kress as Roland Waffle
- Amy Sedaris as Principal Abigail "Abby" Hoffman
- David Alan Grier as Coach Shelly Bragg
- Chelah Horsdal as Winnie Bleeker
- Brenna O'Brien as Morgan
- Avan Jogia as Champ Townsend
- Jordan Becker as Derrick
- Alexia Fast as Susie Salisbury
- Ellie Harvie as Ms. Shoenbourg
- Caitlyn Jenner (Note: Credited as Bruce Jenner; Jenner came out as a trans woman and changed her name in 2015.) as Bruce Jenner
- Chris Kattan as ESPN Announcer / Sploopers Show Host

== Production ==
The film was shot in Vancouver, British Columbia; all school scenes were filmed at Templeton Secondary School.

== Home media ==
The film was released on DVD on February 3, 2009, by Sony Pictures Home Entertainment.
