= Girlfriend in a Coma (novel) =

1998 novel by Douglas Coupland

- Author: Douglas Coupland
- Language: English
- Genre: Novel
- Publisher: HarperCollins Canada
- Publication date: 1998
- Publication place: Canada
- Media type: Print (Hardback and Paperback)
- Pages: 288 pp
- ISBN: 0-00-224396-2 (First edition, hardcover), 0694519510 (First American edition)
- OCLC: 247636406
- Preceded by: Polaroids from the Dead
- Followed by: Miss Wyoming

Girlfriend in a Coma is a novel by Canadian writer and artist Douglas Coupland. It was first published by HarperCollins Canada in 1998. The novel tells the story of a group of friends growing up in Vancouver, British Columbia, Canada in the late 1970s. On the night of a teenage house-wrecking party, one of the protagonists, Karen, falls into a coma. Peculiarly, she seemed to expect it, having given her boyfriend, Richard, a letter detailing the vivid dreams of the future she had experienced and how she wanted to sleep for a thousand years to avoid that dystopia.

The book was named after the 1987 single "Girlfriend in a Coma" by The Smiths. Additionally, Coupland uses other Smiths lyrics, song and album titles within the book such as "Bigmouth Strikes Again", "Hand in Glove", and "The Queen Is Dead".

== Plot summary ==
The first part of the book covers the 17 years in the lives of a group of friends, after one of the friends, Karen, lapses into a coma. Richard has to cope with losing Karen but gaining a daughter, Megan, as fatherhood is thrust upon him: the outcome of their mutual loss of virginity just hours before Karen fell into her coma. Wendy throws herself into work and Linus loses himself, looking for that which is lost. Pamela becomes a supermodel and Hamilton a demolition expert, but none of the friends' lives turn out how they imagined. Broken and lacking, they return to the suburbs of their youth to try to pull themselves together until one day, almost two decades after she fell asleep, Karen regains consciousness.

The book is divided into three parts. The first chapter of the book is narrated by Jared, the ghost of a friend of the characters who died of leukemia at a young age. The rest of Part 1 is narrated by Richard, in the first person, as he tells the story of what happened in the 17 years.

The second part of the book, with no narrator, deals with Karen's return to the world. It also begins to explain where she had been all those years and the reality she had hoped to escape. Then, suddenly, the world ends. This section is narrated in the third person, with insight to all the characters' minds.

The final part of the book details life after everyone except these seven people have fallen asleep and not reawakened. This section is again narrated by Jared. The characters have to deal with the end of the world as predicted by Karen in her coma.

== Characters ==
Karen
Thrust into a coma after having a glimpse of the future, Karen is the tragic figure in this novel. She has a vision of the future she carries into her coma. Upon returning from her coma, she has the mind of a seventeen-year-old, and a daughter, Megan, physically the same age as she is mentally. She constantly wonders what the future and technology has really given humanity.
Richard
The boyfriend of the comatose girlfriend, and the father of her child, Richard's struggle through life is one of the primary focuses of the first part of the novel. He was a close friend to Jared. Jared's death and Karen's coma cause Richard's mental state to be quite weak. A frequent alcoholic, Richard struggles with addiction while waiting for Karen to possibly wake up.
Wendy
The smart one of the group, Wendy moves on to become a doctor working in the Emergency Room of the hospital. While the other characters seem to disappear into addiction or misery, Wendy gives herself to her schooling and work. She later gets together with Linus, though her heart still bears feelings for Jared.
Linus
Shortly after university, Linus leaves to travel the world in a quest to find himself. He spends quite a stay in Las Vegas, but what Linus finds only leaves him feeling emptier than when he left. Linus later marries Wendy.
Pamela
Pamela is the supermodel of the group. She leaves them to enter the decadent lifestyle of the rich and famous. Pamela continually drops celebrity names in conversation, and hints at many drug-induced exploits. She later marries Hamilton, with whom she indulges in her heroin frenzy.
Hamilton
Hamilton is an eccentric member of the group. He, like Pamela, has a problem with heroin and the two marry.
Megan
Born to Karen while in her coma, Megan is raised by Karen's parents. She is a rebellious child, finding solace in thoughts of death. Her father Richard is distant yet there when needed. She dates a very low class man named Skitter and becomes pregnant by him.
Jared
A high school friend of the main cast, Jared was a very promiscuous jock. At the beginning of the novel, he has already died of leukemia and exists as a ghost. The leukemia progressed rapidly, giving him little time after learning of his disease. He is the only other presence to visit the main cast after the End of the World.

== Inspiration ==
Girlfriend wasn't a consciously planned book. It pretty well erupted out of me. I started writing it at the start of 1996, during what was probably the darkest period of my life. I'd just returned in December 1995 from that disastrously exhausting European tour.

— Coupland, from a letter sent to members of the media

In late 1995, Coupland was touring for Microserfs throughout Europe. Coupland returned from his tour burnt out and very fatigued mentally. The period after this tour was, for Coupland, "one of the darkest periods of [his] life". "I could barely open a can of soup or put gas in the car tank". During this dark period, Coupland began to write a new novel. This novel became Girlfriend in a Coma; however, he wasn't sure where the novel was going to take him when he began to write it. The novel "pretty well erupted out of [him]".

The novel is set in Vancouver "because [his] brain was so incapacitated [he] decided [it] had to be set in [his] own neighbourhood."

Comas were also an inspiration for him. "Comas really are peculiar only to the late 20th century. Before, say, 1960, people who might have gone into a coma simply died. Comas are more modern than plastics or TV. I like the notion that comas can allow a person to radically reinvent themselves upon awakening. I think we all want to do that—radically reinvent ourselves—I think it's our deepest need."

Karen's full name is Karen Ann McNeil; further, the circumstances of her lapse into a coma are similar to those in the famous Karen Ann Quinlan case.

The title, a Smiths song title, was chosen because "It's clearly descriptive of the book, but it's also a little salute to those points in my life when I was melting down to soundtracks provided by British gloom rockers."

== History of the novel ==
It is considered one of Coupland's finest novels, with a stronger narrative than some of his earlier books but still providing relevant cultural criticism and commentary. In the UK, The Guardian described the book as Coupland "becoming extraordinary" (25 April 1998) and The Times as "a disturbing, thought-provoking and moving novel. Girlfriend in a Coma has something of the quality of a fairytale, but it contains a sharp realism that makes the book scarily contemporary" (15 May 1999).

BBC Radio 3 broadcast an adaptation of the novel as part of its "Drama on 3" strand on 24 February 2008. It was adapted by Dan Rebellato.

== Television adaptation ==
- It was announced on 22 January 2013, that NBC ordered a pilot for an adaptation. It is written by Liz Brixius and starring Christina Ricci and Miranda Cosgrove. On March 19, 2013, it was announced that Ricci would not be a part of the cast and the show was cancelled.
- A TV movie directed by David Frankel was in pre-production as of August 2013.

== Editions ==
- ISBN 0-00-224396-2 (first edition, hardback, 1998)
- ISBN 0-06-098732-4 (paperback, 1999)
- ISBN 0-00-638542-7 (paperback, 2000)
