= Sparks Fly (album) =

Studio album by Miranda Cosgrove
- Released: April 27, 2010
- Recorded: 2008–2010
- Genres: Pop; pop rock; electropop
- Length: 25:18
- Labels: Columbia; Epic
- Producers: Josh Alexander; Ammo; Mauli B; Backhouse Mike; Matt Beckley; Benny Blanco; Desmond Child; Rivers Cuomo; Scott Cutler; Espionage; Rodney Jerkins; Kool Kojak; Greg Kurstin; Raine Maida; Max Martin; the Matrix; Mozella McDonald; Tom Meredith; Anne Preven; Rock Mafia; Lucas Secon; John Shanks; Shellback; Sheppard Solomon; Shayne Swayney; Jon Vella; Greg Wells

Miranda Cosgrove chronology
About You Now (2009)	Sparks Fly (2010)	High Maintenance (2011)

Singles from Sparks Fly
- 1. "Kissin U" Released: March 22, 2010

Sparks Fly is the only studio album by American actress and singer Miranda Cosgrove. It was released on April 27, 2010, by Sony Music. After making her musical debut on the iCarly soundtrack in 2008, Cosgrove began planning her first album with the Columbia label. Musically, Sparks Fly is a pop record that incorporates electropop elements. Contributions to the album's production came from several producers, including the Matrix, Espionage, Rock Mafia, Darkchild and Max Martin.

Sparks Fly sold 36,000 copies in its first week and peaked at number 8 on the Billboard 200 chart in the United States. "Kissin U" was released as the sole single from the album in March 2010, peaking at number 54 on the Billboard Hot 100 chart. Sparks Fly received mixed reviews from music critics, with some complimenting Cosgrove's vocal ability and likening it to that of Miley Cyrus, while others were unimpressed with the album and criticized the production and lyrical content, calling it predictable and unoriginal. Cosgrove promoted the album mainly through live performances, including a concert segment on Today as well as the Dancing Crazy Tour in 2011, where she promoted both Sparks Fly and her follow-up extended play High Maintenance.

== Background and development ==
Cosgrove's musical career first began with her recording the theme song of the Nickelodeon television series iCarly called "Leave It All to Me", on which Cosgrove starred as the title character on the show. The song features her former Drake & Josh castmate Drake Bell, and was written by Michael Corcoran, one of Bell's band members. Following the success of iCarly, Columbia Records released a soundtrack album of the show on June 10, 2008. The soundtrack album included four songs recorded by Cosgrove that were "Leave It All to Me", "Stay My Baby", "About You Now" and "Headphones On". Cosgrove stated, "Before that, I didn't see myself making an album, but when I spent time in the studio doing the theme song and saw how much fun it was, I wanted to go back."

In July 2008, Cosgrove officially announced plans for a solo album, stating that the album was "different" from her contributions to the iCarly soundtrack, with her "co-writing and getting really into it," and saying that "[I'm] playing a character on iCarly, but this shows more of myself. Some people might think I'm just another actress putting out an album, but I wanted to prove that I'm more than that." The album took two years to make, with Columbia Records' marketing manager Chris Poppe stating in May 2010 that "Miranda started working on [the album] at 14, and she's 16 now. The difference between those two ages is huge, and the songs have had to grow along with her."

On February 5, 2009, Cosgrove released her debut solo recording; the five-song EP About You Now exclusively onto the iTunes Store. The EP included the title track "About You Now", a remix of it, a remix of "Stay My Baby", "F.Y.I." and "Party Girl".

In February 2010, Cosgrove announced the album's first single would be titled "Kissin U", which was first heard by the public live in an interview with Ryan Seacrest. The album's title Sparks Fly comes from the first two words of "Kissin U". The track list, including the four deluxe edition bonus tracks, was announced on Tommy2.net on March 12, 2010, and the artwork was later revealed on March 19, 2010. The song "Daydream" was co-written and originally recorded by Avril Lavigne, co-written by Chantal Kreviazuk and produced by Raine Maida, and was planned for Lavigne's second studio album Under My Skin. The song "Disgusting" was co-written and originally recorded by Kesha, co-written by Pebe Sebert and Sheppard Solomon and Tom Meredith, who produced it with HitmanKTI, and was planned for Kesha's debut studio album Animal. Both songs were unreleased and eventually recorded by Cosgrove. The song "Shakespeare" is a cover, co-written and originally recorded by Susan Cagle, co-written by Jason Brett Levine and was released as a single on Cagle's debut self-recorded album The Subway Recordings. The song was produced by John Shanks and HitmanKTI for this album. The song "Adored" was co-written by Cosgrove and the Matrix, who produced it and was a free digital download two years before the album's official release, first as a rough mix and later as a fully mastered version. The song "Charlie" was co-written by Nicole Morier and Greg Kurstin who produced it and was released as a bonus track exclusively on the iTunes deluxe edition of the album.

== Composition ==
Cosgrove has stated that in the album she was trying to find her own style, so the album experiments with several different kinds of music. In an interview, Cosgrove stated that she tried to put a little bit of her own flare into each and every song on the album. Cosgrove described the album's lead single "Kissin U", as "kind of a really happy, sweet song". The songs on the album generally deal with love and relationships. Cosgrove has stated that this was unintentional, but she realized this after she had already picked all of the songs on the album.

In their review of the album, Portrait Magazine stated the album would target teenagers, saying,

The verdict on Miranda's musical effort is, like her album, a little confusing. I don't think she's quite at the point of being on mainstream radio; she's got a little bit of work to do before that. But her bubblegum tracks are good enough to be played on children's radio stations, like Radio Disney, for example. Her current sound, the mixture of club beats and the sugary sweet pop, will probably hit well with the younger end of her audience. I just don't know if anyone over the age of thirteen is going to want to listen to her album all that often. Tracks like “Disgusting” will probably land well with older teens, but when they can listen to its writer on the radio already, I don't see the need for them to buy this album.

An essentially pop album, Sparks Fly exhibits others elements and multi-tracked harmonies. "Kissin U", "Shakespeare", "Disgusting" and "Charlie" features a catchy pop tune and "Adored", "What Are You Waiting For?" and "Hey You" featured the pop ballad. Other harmonies included the electropop tracks "BAM", "Oh Oh", "There Will Be Tears" and "Brand New You", the R&B track "Beautiful Mess" and the pop rock-driven "Daydream". "BAM" was produced by Antonina Armato (who has worked with Miley Cyrus and Selena Gomez), Tim James and Rodney Jerkins (who has worked with Britney Spears, Brandy, Janet Jackson and Destiny's Child). "Daydream" was written by Avril Lavigne. "Kissin U" and "Oh Oh" was produced by Dr. Luke and Max Martin, respectively, the biggest producers of the time.

Teenink also praised the lyrical content and friendly nature of the music, stating, "Any girl would love this album because it is upbeat and describes the way most girls feel when they are in love. Sparks Fly is a wonderful CD because it is upbeat, and has music that is very easy to relate to. Love may hurt and break your heart, but this album is sure to put a smile on your face." They later went on to say, "The album Sparks Fly has a good musical beat and positive lyrics. The song BAM is fast-paced and is an easy song to relate to. [...] This song is saying that once you find the one person that you love everything else doesn't matter, because the only thing that's important is being with the one that you love."

== Promotion ==
To promote the album, Cosgrove performed the single "Kissin U" live at the Kids Choice Awards pre-show. Nickelodeon also aired a television special titled 7 Secrets: Miranda Cosgrove, which aired on April 24, 2010. The half-hour show revealed things about Cosgrove, such as how she got her start in the business, to some of her most embarrassing moments. The days following the album's release, Cosgrove did several album signings and appearances, including a stop at a Toys-R-Us in New York City. Cosgrove embarked on a radio promotional tour, and has made appearances at radio concerts in the summer of 2010. On September 6, 2010, she performed "Kissin U", "BAM" which was written and produced by Rock Mafia and Darkchild, and "About You Now" which is a cover, co-written by Cathy Dennis and Dr. Luke who produced it and was originally recorded by the Sugababes and released as a single on their fifth studio album Change, on Today. On a special episode of iCarly, season 4: episode 5 titled "iDo", Cosgrove performed the song "Shakespeare" at a wedding (in character as Carly Shay). The song is performed when the bride has second thoughts about the wedding due to her love for Carly's older brother, Spencer (played by Jerry Trainor). The song is sung by Carly to remind the couple about how in love they are.

Cosgrove headlined her own tour, titled Dancing Crazy Tour which is named after Cosgrove's single "Dancing Crazy" co-written by Avril Lavigne with Max Martin and Shellback, who produced it and was released on Cosgrove's second EP High Maintenance which was released on March 15, 2011. The tour began on January 24, 2011, and ended on August 10, 2011, due to Cosgrove having a broken ankle from a tour bus collision. Cosgrove resumed touring the following year. The tour featured dates in House of Blues locations such as ones located in Houston, Texas, and Anaheim, California. She also performed at several theatres on the tour including locations in cities such as Atlanta, GA, Tampa, FL and Orlando FL. Cosgrove opened up the tour on its first show by saying,

"I used to always think I was just going to be an actress, but now I'm leaning towards music and singing too. In the beginning, I didn't really think about my sound too much. I was just trying to figure out the kind of music that was really me and my thing. But my songs are about the experiences I've been through, and when I'm singing them, I try to put myself into it, so hopefully my music just reflects me."

Accompanying Cosgrove on the tour was Greyson Chance, who rose to fame when a video of him singing "Paparazzi" by Lady Gaga emerged on popular video sharing website YouTube. Chance performed several of his own original songs, as well as covers from famous artists. The tour was financially successful. The second show on the tour, which took place in Minneapolis, sold about 54% of its tickets. The shows total gross revenue was $37,256. The fourth show of the tour, which took place in Rosemont, Illinois, was much more successful, selling 90% of the available tickets. The total gross revenue for the show was $118,435.

== Singles ==
"Kissin U" is the album's lead and only single. Along with being the lead single from this album, it and "Adored" were the only two songs that Cosgrove co-wrote for it. Lyrically, the track talks of the feeling Cosgrove gets as she's kissing her boyfriend. The lyrics as well as the melody were received positively by several music critics. The song was released onto iTunes on March 22, 2010. The single debuted at 87 on the Billboard Hot 100, after hitting the digital tracks chart the previous week. The song eventually peaked at 54. It is also her first single to chart outside of the United States, entering the charts in Germany and Austria, among others. The music video was directed by Alan Ferguson, and features Cosgrove and her love interest as they flirt doing daily things. The video also features scenes of Cosgrove singing and walking down the beach.

"Daydream" and "Disgusting" were released exclusively on iTunes in Japan as promotional singles.

== Critical reception ==
Professional ratings
Review scores
Source	Rating
AllMusic	2/5 stars
Billboard	3/5 stars
Common Sense Media	3/5 stars

The album was met with a generally mixed reception from critics. Stephen Thomas Erlewine, who reviewed the album for AllMusic, gave the album a negative review, stating that "Miranda winds up buried underneath the weight of production on Sparks Fly — it often comes across like a cross of Miley Cyrus and Kesha's full-frontal assault." Erlewine also stated that "Sparks Fly is bedecked in modern electronic rhythms and icy hooks, yet the glassy surface sheen flies in the face of the natural charm Cosgrove displays on iCarly and its accompanying soundtrack." However, Jeff Giles of Popdose gave the album a more positive review, stating "...Sparks Fly is a perfectly bite-sized chunk of perfectly bite-sized pop - In other words, songs about boys and girls, written by men and women, and performed by some of the sharpest studio vets in the business." Greg Victor of Parcbench also gave the album, as well as Cosgrove herself, a positive review, stating "It is brilliantly produced and won’t let you down if you are looking for some fun, new, uncomplicated music." He also commented on Cosgrove as an artist, saying "She is a fresh voice that stands out in an over-crowded field of pop princesses." The review ended with Victor awarding the album three out of four stars. Sparklingstar.net also gave the album a positive review, and stated that "Sparks Fly has that classic pop album sound and songs, if you are a fan of Miley Cyrus and Britney Spears you will be fan of Miranda, one thing I must say is that her voice sounds great throughout the entire CD, and she took it to find songs that fit her voice."

Commonsensemedia.org gave the album a mixed review, saying "Formulaic at best, painfully predictable at its worst, Sparks Fly could only be appealing to the youngest of ears, not jaded by hundreds of similarly sounding releases. Miranda Cosgrove does bring a unique sincerity to this bubblegum love-in, and despite the forgettable accompanying pop instrumentals, her message comes through loud and clear. With a dash of spunky attitude she saves the CD from completely drowning in a sea of sweetness." Starletinc.com was also mixed in their review, saying that "This is a first attempt by Miranda as recording artist and she did quite alright. It still lacks a little bit of identity but that isn’t anything shocking for a sixteen year old, especially when they’re [sic] main trade is actress rather than recording artist [...] While it all isn’t anything special it’s still enjoyable enough to listen to." The review ended with them awarding Sparks Fly three out of five stars.

Erin Clendaniel of Billboard said in her review of the album, "Full of saccharin-sweet pop riffs and head-bobbing beats that one would expect from a Nickelodeon TV actress, iCarly star Miranda Cosgrove's debut album, Sparks Fly, delivers the total tween package. Production from the Matrix and Espionage, among others, enhances Cosgrove's pretty standard delivery, but some of her lyrics are strangely vague. Over an electropop melody on the song "Disgusting" (co-penned by Kesha), Cosgrove sings, 'It's disgusting how you change me from a bandit to a baby.' And the piano-based ballad 'Hey You' briefly alludes to the Greek myth of Icarus and Daedalus, while 'Shakespeare' name-drops Jeff Buckley (who died in 1997 when Cosgrove was only 4 years old). Elsewhere, paired with upbeat guitars and drum machines on the girl-power anthem 'There Will Be Tears,' the singer happily belts out about being 'the one that got away.' Parents will likely tire of it quickly, but Sparks Fly will surely be stuck on repeat in minivans across the country.

== Commercial performance ==
Sparks Fly sold 36,000 copies in its first week, earning it the eight position on the Billboard 200 on the issue dated May 5, 2010. The album spent one week inside the top 10, before falling out the next week. Sparks Fly spent five weeks inside the Top 50, before quickly sliding down. The album has also become successful in foreign countries as well. In Mexico, the album debuted at number 84. The following week, the album fell twelve spots to 96. The album has currently sold a total of 3,000 copies there. The album was also successful on the music charts in Austria, where it managed to peak inside the Top 50 of the albums chart, entering at number 46. The album also spent one week on the German album charts, debuting and peaking at number 96. On the Swiss album's chart, the album peaked inside of the Top 40, debuting at number 35 on the chart.

== Track listing ==
Sparks Fly track listing
No.	Title	Writer(s)	Producer(s)	Length
1.	"Kissin U"	Lukasz Gottwald; Claude Kelly; Miranda Cosgrove	Ammo; Kool Kojak; Emily Wright^{[a]}	3:18
2.	"BAM"	Rodney Jerkins; Antonina Armato; Tim James	Jerkins; Rock Mafia	2:51
3.	"Disgusting"	Tom Meredith; Kesha Sebert; Pebe Sebert; Sheppard Solomon	Meredith; Solomon	3:39
4.	"Shakespeare"	Nathan Nelson; Jason Brett Levine; Susan Florea Cagle	John Shanks	3:42
5.	"Hey You"	Paula Winger; C. F. Kip Winger	Greg Wells	3:57
6.	"There Will Be Tears"	Joshua Coleman; Allan Grigg; Bonnie McKee	Ammo; Kojak; Wright^{[a]}	3:14
7.	"Oh Oh"	Max Martin; Savan Kotecha; Peer Åström	Meredith; Sidh Solanki^{[b]}	2:54
8.	"Daydream"	Chantal Kreviazuk; Avril Lavigne	Raine Maida	3:11
Total length:				25:18

Deluxe edition bonus tracks
No.	Title	Writer(s)	Producer(s)	Length
9.	"Brand New You"	James Bourne; Espen Lind; Amund Bjørklund	Espionage; Brother Theresa^{[c]}	3:33
10.	"What Are You Waiting For?"	Bourne; Lind; Bjørklund	Espionage	3:35
11.	"Adored"	Lauren Christy; Graham Edwards; Scott Spock; Cosgrove	The Matrix	3:32
12.	"Beautiful Mess"	Christy; Desmond Child; Jon Vella; Shayne Swayney	Child; Vella; Swayney	3:03
Total length:				41:01

iTunes Store deluxe edition / 2017 digital deluxe reissue
No.	Title	Writer(s)	Producer(s)	Length
13.	"Charlie"	Greg Kurstin; Nicole Morier	Kurstin; Mauli B	3:13
Total length:				44:14

Japanese edition
No.	Title	Writer(s)	Producer(s)	Length
1.	"Kissin U"	Gottwald; Kelly; Cosgrove	Ammo; Kojak; Wright^{[a]}	3:18
2.	"Disgusting"	Meredith; K. Sebert; P. Sebert; Solomon	Meredith; Solomon	3:38
3.	"High Maintenance" (featuring Rivers Cuomo)	Billy Steinberg; Rivers Cuomo; Josh Alexander	Alexander; Cuomo	3:09
4.	"Dancing Crazy"	Shellback; Martin; Lavigne	Martin; Shellback	3:40
5.	"There Will Be Tears"	Coleman; Grigg; McKee	Ammo; Kojak; Wright^{[a]}	3:13
6.	"Kiss You Up"	Jimmy Harry; Tony Kanal; Mozella McDonald	McDonald	3:06
7.	"Shakespeare"	Levine; Cagle	Shanks	3:42
8.	"Daydream"	Kreviazuk; Lavigne	Maida	3:10
9.	"About You Now"	Gottwald; Cathy Dennis	Matt Beckley; Benny Blanco; Dr. Luke^{[d]}	3:11
10.	"Oh Oh"	Martin; Kotecha; Åström	Meredith; Solanki^{[b]}	2:53
11.	"Hey You"	P. Winger; C. Winger	Wells	3:56
12.	"Face of Love"	Lucas Secon; Carsten Mortensen; Scott Cutler; Anne Preven	Secon; Cutler^{[e]}; Preven^{[e]}	3:32
13.	"BAM"	Jerkins; Armato; James	Rock Mafia; Jerkins	2:50
14.	"Sayonara"	Kurstin; Morier; McKee	Kurstin	2:41
15.	"Leave It All to Me" (featuring Drake Bell)	Michael Corcoran	Backhouse Mike	2:41
Total length:				48:40

Notes

- ^{^[a]} – Vocal production
- ^{^[b]} – Additional vocal production
- ^{^[c]} – Co-production
- ^{^[d]} – Executive production
- ^{^[e]} – Main and vocal production
- "Shakespeare" is a cover of the song by Susan Cagle, which was released in 2006.
- "Kiss You Up" is a cover of the song by Shontelle, which was released in 2010.
- "About You Now" is a cover of the song by Sugababes, which was released in 2007.

== Personnel ==
- David Campbell – string arrangements
- Miranda Cosgrove - main vocals
- John Hanes – mixing
- Clyde Haygood – hair stylist
- Steven Jensen – management
- Rodney Jerkins – producer
- Devrim Karaglu – programming
- Jennifer Karr – background vocals
- Suzie Katayama – contractor
- Claude Kelly – background vocals
- The Kids – stylist
- Martin Kirkup – management
- Kool Kojak – engineer, musician, producer, programming
- Bill Lefler – drums
- Natalie Leggett – violin
- Tom Lord-Alge – mixing
- Nigel Ludemo – engineer
- Ian McGregor – engineer
- Raine Maida – bass, engineer, acoustic guitar, producer, programming
- Bonnie McKee – background vocals
- Tom Meredith – engineer, musician, producer, programming
- Armen Pakchian – assistant
- Alyssa Park – violin
- Sara Parkins – violin
- Steve Richards – cello
- Tim Roberts – assistant
- Rock Mafia – producer
- Jeff Rothschild – drums, engineer, mixing
- John Shanks – bass, guitar, keyboards, producer
- Sidh Solanki – vocal producer
- Sheppard Solomon – producer
- Teresa Stanislav – violin
- Rudolph Stein – cello
- Shari Sutcliffe – production coordination
- Miranda Penn Turin – photography
- Josefiha Vergara – violin
- Greg Wells – bass, drums, guitar, mixing, piano, producer
- Rob Wells – programming
- Paula Winger – background vocals
- Lucy Woodward – background vocals
- Emily Wright – vocal producer

== Charts ==
Weekly chart performance for Sparks Fly
Chart (2010)	Peak position
Austrian Albums (Ö3 Austria)	46
German Albums (Offizielle Top 100)	96
Mexican Albums (Top 100 Mexico)	84
Swiss Albums (Schweizer Hitparade)	35
US Billboard 200	8
