= Miss Wyoming (novel) =

2000 novel by Douglas Coupland

- Author: Douglas Coupland
- Language: English
- Genre: Novel
- Publisher: Random House
- Publication date: 2000
- Publication place: Canada
- Media type: Print (Hardback, Paperback)
- Preceded by: Girlfriend in a Coma
- Followed by: All Families Are Psychotic

Miss Wyoming is a novel by Douglas Coupland. It was first published by Random House of Canada in January 2000.

The novel follows two protagonists, Susan Colgate, a former Miss Wyoming, and John Johnson, a former action film producer. Both have experienced early success but now find themselves in terminal career decline and with a host of personal problems. When circumstances intervene to offer routes out of their lives and then to bring them together, they are afforded the opportunity to discover themselves and to brighten their futures.

The title concretely derives from a plot point in the book in which a driven stage mother moves the family to Wyoming because it is the easiest state from which to land contestants in national competitions; however, it has been noted that the title also comments on the peculiar notion of longing for something a person hasn't experienced herself.

== Plot ==
The novel is the story of John Johnson and Susan Colgate. It begins with a meeting between Susan and John after their yearlong absences from the world, and then progresses to tell the stories of their disappearances through flashbacks. The flashbacks have no temporal order. Each chapter is a different flashback, intermixed with chapters of temporally present plot.

Susan Colgate
A former child pageant star, a 1980s television family daughter, a closeted rock star's wife, and a B movie actress. She was on a plane heading across the United States that crashed, but she survives without a scratch. She takes this opportunity to disappear into the night, leaving behind her identity.
John Johnson
A decadent film producer. His life is composed of drugs and women. He dies from the flu, but his death is only temporary. While dead, he has a vision of Susan Colgate. Once revived, Johnson decides to give away his decadent lifestyle and to live on the road like Jack Kerouac.

The novel tells their stories, the stories of the characters that they encounter, and the story of their lives after they meet. The novel is written in the third person.

== Inspiration ==
The whole thing with beauty pageants is really mother-driven. What three-year-old wants to be a beauty queen? … There's all this unhappiness and they think by making their kids a receptacle of all that unhappiness they can turn it into gold. The male version of this is Hollywood, full of hungry, unfulfilled people. I thought it would be interesting to take male and female versions of these people and put them together when they both wanted to change.

— Coupland on the roles of the characters

The inspiration for Miss Wyoming was a 1998 article in The National Enquirer entitled "Leathery movie producer Robert Evans marries Eighties soap star Catherine Oxenberg".

Coupland also based his opinions on celebrity life on his experiences with the rich and famous. "I guess a lot of it's residue from the fact that I've met all these famous people over the years. Some of them became friends. Some of them I met in passing, but I ended up with this huge reservoir of things [about fame] that wanted to be tapped."

== History ==
Between 1989 and 1997 or so, I did not go anywhere without a notebook that could fit in my pocket. . . . Then around '97, whatever I was doing became internal. So that with 'Miss Wyoming' there's not a single note for it. . . . Now it all just comes out of my head, and because it comes out of my head I think it's a bit more emotionally driven than artifactually or environmentally driven.

— Coupland on the change in creation for Miss Wyoming.

Miss Wyoming marked a radical departure from Coupland's writing style for earlier novels. Previously, he wrote his notes from a notebook filled with observations. For Miss Wyoming, Coupland internalized the note-taking process. It was also his first novel written entirely in the third person.

== Criticism and Interpretation ==
Jensen, Mikkel "Miss(ed) Generation: Douglas Coupland's Miss Wyoming. in Culture Unbound: Journal of Current Cultural Research, Volume 3, 2011, pp. 455–474. Direct link: https://doi.org/10.3384/cu.2000.1525.113455
