= Dan Rebellato =

English dramatist and academic

Dan Rebellato (born 1968) is an English dramatist and academic born in South London.

He is Professor of Contemporary Theatre at Royal Holloway, University of London and has written extensively for radio and the stage. He has twice been nominated for a Sony Award, and writes regularly for The Guardian Theatre Blog.

== Stage plays ==
- Here's What I Did With My Body One Day. Lightwork: Pleasance Theatre, London. National Tour, 2006.
- Mile End. Analogue: Edinburgh Festival, 2007. International tour, 2007. Southwark Playhouse, 2008.
- Static. 22 April–10 May 2008 at the Soho Theatre, London
- Theatremorphosis. Part of the CCA Glasgow's Stage Fright event 4 April–23 May 2009.
- Beachy Head. Written with Emma Jowett and Lewis Hetherington. Analogue: Edinburgh Fringe Festival 2009; National Tour, 2011.
- Chekhov in Hell. 4–20 November 2010 at the Drum at the Theatre Royal, Plymouth, before transferring to the Soho Theatre, London 20 April–14 May 2011

== Radio plays and adaptations ==
- The Midwich Cuckoos. Adaptation of novel by John Wyndham. BBC Radio 4, November 2003. [Released as a BBC Audiobook 2007]
- Dead Souls. Adaptation of novel by Nikolai Gogol. BBC Radio 4, April 2006.
- Cavalry. BBC Radio 4, March 2008.
- Girlfriend in a Coma. Adaptation of a Douglas Coupland novel by the same name. BBC Radio 3, February 2008.
- And So Say All of Us. Written with Linda McLean and Duncan Macmillan. (First broadcast on BBC Radio 3 on 2 May 2010)
- My Life is a Series of People Saying Goodbye. BBC Radio 4, April 2011)
- Negative Signs of Progress. BBC Radio 4, February 2013

== Notable publications ==
- 1956 and all That, London: Routledge, 1999.
- Static, London: Oberon Books, 2008.
- Theatre & Globalization, Basingstoke: Palgrave, 2009.
- Contemporary European Theatre Directors, co-edited with Maria M. Delgado, London: Routledge, 2010.
- Chekhov in Hell, London: Oberon, 2010 (rev. ed. 2011).
- Beachy Head, co-written with Emma Jowett and Lewis Hetherington. London: Oberon, 2011.
- The Suspect Culture Book co-edited with Graham Eatough, London: Oberon, 2011.
- Modern British Playwriting 2000-2009: Voices, Documents, New Interpretations London: Methuen Drama, 2013.
