= London Elise Moore =

American actress and stunt performer (born 1992)

- Born: November 2, 1992 (age 32); Texas, U.S.
- Other names: London Kress; London Elise Kress
- Occupations: Actress; stunt performer
- Years active: 2013–present
- Spouse: Nathan Kress (m. 2015)
- Children: 3

External image
- London Elise Moore IMDb photo

London Elise Kress (née Moore; born November 2, 1992) is an American actress, juggler and stunt performer.

== Career ==
She appeared in the movie Into the Storm (2014) with her future then-to-be husband Nathan Kress. She acted in The Other Woman (2014), Need for Speed (2014), Insidious: Chapter 3 (2015) and the TV series Rake (2014). She has done stunt double work as well for the movies Insidious Chapter 3, Grandma, Into the Storm, and Oz the Great and Powerful.

== Personal life ==
Moore married actor Nathan Kress on November 15, 2015. Together, they have two daughters and one son: Rosie Carolyn (b. 2017), Evie Elise (b. 2021), and Lincoln William (b. 2023).
