= ICarly 2: iJoin the Click! =

2010 video game

iCarly 2: iJoin the Click!
- Cover of North American Wii version
- Developer: Big Blue Bubble
- Publisher: Activision
- Series: iCarly series
- Platforms: Wii, Nintendo DS
- Release: NA: November 16, 2010; AU: November 17, 2010; EU: November 19, 2010
- Genre: Social simulation
- Mode: Single-player

iCarly 2: iJoin the Click! is a 2010 social simulation video game developed by Big Blue Bubble, published by Activision, and licensed by Nintendo for the Wii and Nintendo DS. It is loosely based on the TV series of the same name and the standalone sequel to the original iCarly game.

== Development and release ==
iCarly 2 was announced in July 2010. It was developed by Big Blue Bubble, a company which had previously worked on a Windows game called iCarly: iDream in Toons in 2009.

The game was released for the Wii and Nintendo DS in the US on November 16, 2010, along with a line of iCarly toys from Playmates with in-game codes. In a press release, actors from the cast of the show remarked on the game, with Nathan Kress saying the game has "a much more in-depth feel" than the original installment. Miranda Cosgrove said: "It's so exciting to see the end results for the video game and hear my own voice come from my animated character."

== Gameplay ==
Players begin as a new student at Ridgeway Secondary School. They can interact with main characters Carly, Sam and Freddie at locations from the show, such as Groovy Smoothie, the Pacific Place Mall, and Carly's apartment. Gameplay is not the same as the original, with the player being able to create an avatar who can explore an open world from a third-person perspective. While the main cast of Carly, Sam, Freddie, Spencer, and Gibby are voice acted, the rest of the characters speak in gibberish.

== Reception ==
iCarly 2, like its predecessor, released to limited critical reception. It did not receive enough reviews on Metacritic for either platform to have a score listed.

Common Sense Media called iCarly 2 "a messy, sometimes incomprehensible mish-mash of a game", citing its dialogue as the only redeeming quality for fans of the show.
