= High Maintenance (song) =

Song by Miranda Cosgrove

from the EP High Maintenance and the album Sparks Fly (Japan edition)
- Length: 3:09
- Label: Columbia
- Songwriters: Josh Alexander; Rivers Cuomo; Billy Steinberg
- Producers: Josh Alexander; Rivers Cuomo

"High Maintenance" is a song by American singer and actress Miranda Cosgrove from her second extended play of the same name in 2011. The song features additional vocals by Rivers Cuomo from Weezer. The song was written by Cuomo, Josh Alexander and Billy Steinberg, and peaked on the Slovakia chart IFPI at number seventy-nine.

== Background ==
In an interview with Billboard, Cosgrove revealed a duet with Rivers Cuomo, co-written by Cuomo, along with Josh Alexander and Billy Steinberg and produced by Cuomo.

"It's the first duet I've ever done, and it was really fun. My part of the song is this girl who's high maintenance, and Rivers is this guy who's having to put up with it. I really enjoyed working with (Cuomo). He's really cool. I've worked with Dr. Luke for awhile... and he ended up introducing me to Rivers.

— Cosgrove about new EP and collaboration with Rivers Cuomo"

== Reception ==
=== Critical reception ===
Hiponline said of the song, "Title track “High Maintenance” sees Miranda trading tongue-in-cheek vocals about her carefree, fun-loving ways with Rivers Cuomo, who contributed as a songwriter and producer to the track.". Lauren Carter of The Boston Herald compared the sound to the likes of Avril Lavigne and Kesha and commented "High Maintenance is mostly high-octane fun, Cosgrove's all-grown-up soundtrack to letting loose and testing the rules without breaking them." Mikael Wood of Entertainment Weekly said the song is stronger than before. Allison Stewart of The Washington Post said that High Maintenance will sound familiar to anyone who heard her modestly received, similar-sounding 2010 full-length debut, Sparks Fly or any other teen pop disc released in the last five years."

=== Commercial performance ===
The song peaked on the Slovakia chart IFPI at number seventy-nine.

== Charts ==
| Chart (2011) | Peak position |
|---|---|
| Slovakia (IFPI) | 79 |
