= Susan Justice =

American singer-songwriter (1980–2024)

- Born: Susan Cagle; March 10, 1980; Aruba Island
- Origin: New York City, NY, US
- Died: July 24, 2024 (aged 44)
- Genre: Pop rock
- Occupations: Singer-songwriter, guitarist
- Instruments: Vocals, guitar
- Years active: 2002–2024
- Labels: Columbia Records, Warner Bros. Records, EMI
- Website: MySpace page

Susan Cagle (March 10, 1980 – July 24, 2024), also known professionally as Susan Justice, was an American pop rock singer-songwriter and guitarist.

She is known best for her debut self-recorded album, The Subway Recordings.

== Early life ==
Susan Cagle was born on March 10, 1980 in Aruba Island. Cagle is the second-oldest of ten children. Accompanied by several of her siblings as The Susan Cagle Band, she started performing in subway stations in New York City as part of the Music Under New York program. In addition to singing, Cagle plays the guitar in the majority of her performances, with her sister Caroline playing bass and her brother Jesse on second guitar.

As a child, Cagle traveled the world with her family, living in or visiting countries including Venezuela, Mexico, Greece, Italy, France, Germany, England, Scotland, and Ireland. Her parents were members of the Children of God new religious movement, widely referred to as a cult, and like actors River Phoenix and Rose McGowan (who also spent their early childhood in the group), she and her siblings would often busk on street corners for passers by.

== Career ==
Cagle began playing guitar at the age of 7, and by the age of 14 was writing poetry and songs. When older, she decided to leave her family and the Children of God group, at odds over their beliefs, and moved to New York. She soon began writing, recording music and performing in subway stations (her album, The Subway Recordings, is cut from live shows).

During a show in the 34th Street – Herald Square subway station, Cagle was discovered by producer Jay Levine, who introduced her to then new president of Columbia Records, Steve Greenberg. She soon became his first signing in this placement. Cagle released her debut album, The Subway Recordings, in 2007 with Lefthook Entertainment and Columbia Records.

After leaving Columbia Records in 2009 and signing to Warner Bros., Cagle changed her stage name to Susan Justice, saying it happened "of its own accord" and it (the name change) was something she felt she "needed to do". Her second album is titled Eat Dirt and was released March 26, 2012. The album was released by Capitol Records.

=== Notable performances ===
On May 10, 2007, Cagle and her band performed "Dear Oprah", an ode to billionaire talk show host Oprah Winfrey, on The Oprah Winfrey Show. "Dear Oprah" features such lyrics as: "Dear Oprah, Have you ever felt like breakin’ down/ when there ain't no one who cares around/did you ever feel this way back in the day so blue/ what did you do?"

The band appeared in the 2006 MTV Video Music Awards warm up in the "You Hear It First".

She appears in the Gary King independent film New York Lately as Truly Hanssen. The film was released in 2008 to generally favorable reviews.

Her life and music were the subject of a profile and interview on the NPR program Morning Edition that aired Monday, March 26, 2012.

She died on July 24, 2024.
