= ICarly (video game) =

2009 video game

iCarly
- Nintendo DS North American box art
- Developers: Blitz Games (Wii); Human Soft (Nintendo DS)
- Publisher: Activision
- Director: John Jarvis
- Designers: Mike Bithell; Jonathan Tainsh; Kory Vandenberg
- Programmers: Chris Bunner; Duncan Chambers; Andrew Hague; Matthew Hayward
- Artists: Auburn Hodgson; Matthew Norledge; Owen Williams
- Writers: Myles McLeod; Stuart Maine
- Composer: Matt Black
- Platforms: Wii, Nintendo DS
- Release: Nintendo DS: NA: October 27, 2009; AU: November 6, 2009; EU: November 6, 2009; Wii: NA: October 20, 2009; AU: November 6, 2009; EU: November 6, 2009
- Genre: Party
- Modes: Single-player, multiplayer

iCarly (or iCarly: The Game) is a 2009 party video game loosely based on the TV series of the same name. The Wii version of the game was developed by Blitz Games, while the Nintendo DS version was developed by Human Soft, with Activision publishing and Nintendo licensing both versions. The game was released in North America for the Nintendo DS on October 27, 2009, and for the Wii on October 20, 2009. Both versions were also released in Europe and Australia on November 6, 2009.

The game received a standalone sequel titled iCarly 2: iJoin the Click!, which was released for the Wii and Nintendo DS on November 16, 2010.

== Development and release ==
In May 2009, Activision announced they had partnered with Nickelodeon to create an iCarly game for the Wii and Nintendo DS to be released in fall of that year. The game was released in October 2009, with David Oxford of Activision Publishing describing it as "an energetic gameplay experience that is non-stop entertainment" and Steve Youngwood of Nickelodeon saying it would "tap[...] into kids' creativity to provide them with endless fun."

== Gameplay ==
Based on the TV series, iCarly is about a girl named Carly Shay who creates her own web show called iCarly with her best friends Sam and Freddie. Carly's videos that are uploaded on the iCarly site are being deleted, and it turns out that Nevel has taken down their website. So Carly and her friends have to get their website back by playing 10 minigames, presented as show skits, and they allow players to work with the characters through new adventures. The iCreate mode lets players add their own touches to the webisodes by swapping out props, characters, color schemes, audio, intros, outros and other elements. Up to four players can either compete or cooperate to complete the skits and earn Web-Creds, which can then be used to purchase new items, props, accessories and locations from in-game websites.

The Wii version of the game allows for up to four players at once.

== Reception ==
Common Sense Media commented in their review that the contained mini-games were "genuinely fun, easy to learn but hard to master", but that "there just aren't enough of them, which leads to a lot of repetition" Digital Spy praised the game's voice acting and story, but criticized the gameplay as "slightly repetitive", the customization as "rather surface level", the game as having "limited substance".
