= Dancing Crazy Tour =

2011 concert tour by Miranda Cosgrove

- Tour by Miranda Cosgrove
- Promotional poster for the tour
- Location: North America
- Associated album: Sparks Fly; High Maintenance
- Start date: January 22, 2011
- End date: August 10, 2011
- Legs: 2
- No. of shows: 44
- Box office: $573,958

Miranda Cosgrove concert chronology
- Dancing Crazy Tour (2011); Summer Tour (2012)

The Dancing Crazy Tour was the debut concert tour by the American entertainer Miranda Cosgrove. Visiting North America, it supported her debut studio album, Sparks Fly. The tour began in Missouri and traveled throughout the United States and ended in Ohio. Cosgrove continued the tour into the summer to promote her second EP, High Maintenance. Dubbed the Dancing Crazy Summer Tour, the singer traveled the United States and Canada and performed at music festivals and state fairs.

== Background ==
Originally conceived as the "Sparks Fly Tour", Cosgrove provided a few tour dates on her official website in October 2010. In December, Cosgrove announced the tour on her official website before the news hit various media outlets the next day. Now known as the Dancing Crazy Tour, Cosgrove toured the United States in theaters and music halls. Later, Cosgrove released the single "Dancing Crazy", which was co-written by Avril Lavigne with Max Martin and Shellback, who produced it. Joining Cosgrove on tour was American singer-songwriter Greyson Chance, who gained notoriety in 2010 with his cover of Lady Gaga's "Paparazzi". To introduce the tour, Cosgrove stated,

"I used to always think I was just going to be an actress, but now I'm leaning towards music and singing too. In the beginning, I didn't really think about my sound too much. I was just trying to figure out the kind of music that was really me and my thing. But my songs are about the experiences I've been through, and when I'm singing them, I try to put myself into it, so hopefully my music just reflects me."

== Cancellation ==
On August 11, 2011, the tour was interrupted when Cosgrove's tour bus was involved in a traffic collision on Interstate 70 in Vandalia, Illinois. Cosgrove and four other passengers were injured, with her sustaining a broken ankle. Initial reports confirmed that the tour would be postponed while Cosgrove recovered. A week later, Cosgrove released a statement stating that the tour was canceled by the doctor's orders.

== Tour dates ==
List of 2011 concerts
Date	City	Country	Venue	Opening acts	Attendance	Revenue
January 22	Kansas City	United States	Uptown Theater	Greyson Chance	—	
January 25	Minneapolis	United States	State Theatre	Greyson Chance	1,104 / 2,040 (54%)	$37,256
January 26	Milwaukee	United States	Pabst Theater	Greyson Chance	—	
January 28	Rosemont	United States	Rosemont Theatre	Greyson Chance	3,806 / 4,227 (90%)	$118,435
January 29	Indianapolis	United States	Murat Theatre	Greyson Chance	—	
January 30	Cleveland	United States	State Theatre	Greyson Chance	—	
February 1	Detroit	United States	The Fillmore Detroit	Greyson Chance	—	
February 2	Munhall	United States	Carnegie Library Music Hall	Greyson Chance	—	
February 4	Wallingford	United States	Oakdale Theatre	Greyson Chance	—	
February 5	New York City	United States	Beacon Theatre	Greyson Chance	2,215 / 2,793 (79%)	$107,619
February 6	Glenside	United States	Keswick Theatre	Greyson Chance	—	
February 8	Montclair	United States	Wellmont Theatre	Greyson Chance	—	
February 9	North Bethesda	United States	Music Center at Strathmore	Greyson Chance	—	
February 10	Lowell	United States	Lowell Memorial Auditorium	Greyson Chance	2,340 / 2,634 (89%)	$81,195
February 12	Montclair	United States	Wellmont Theatre	Greyson Chance	—	
February 13	Westbury	United States	NYCB Theatre at Westbury	Greyson Chance	—	
February 15	Atlanta	United States	Center Stage Theater	Greyson Chance	—	
February 16	Tampa	United States	Tampa Theatre	Greyson Chance	959 / 1,385 (69%)	$40,642
February 17	Hollywood	United States	Hard Rock Live	Greyson Chance	—	
February 19	Grand Prairie	United States	Verizon Theatre at Grand Prairie	Greyson Chance	2,398 / 6,052 (40%)	$71,829
February 20	Houston	United States	House of Blues	Greyson Chance	—	
February 23	Tempe	United States	Marquee Theatre	Greyson Chance	—	
February 24	Anaheim	United States	House of Blues	Greyson Chance	—	
February 25	Los Angeles	United States	Club Nokia	Greyson Chance	1,254 / 1,254 (100%)	$54,660
July 15	Columbus	United States	Lifestyle Communities Pavilion	Cody Simpson	—	
July 16 (Note: This concert is a part of Time Warner Cable In-Park Concert Series.)	Darien	United States	Darien Lake Performing Arts Center	Cody Simpson	—	
July 17 (Note: This concert is a part of the Summer Concert Series.)	Hershey	United States	Hersheypark Amphitheatre	Cody Simpson	—	
July 19	Gilford	United States	Meadowbrook U.S. Cellular Pavilion	Cody Simpson	1,539 / 5,942 (26%)	$62,322
July 21	Wantagh	United States	Nikon at Jones Beach Theater	Cody Simpson	—	
July 22	Philadelphia	United States	Mann Center for the Performing Arts	Cody Simpson	—	
July 23	Holmdel Township	United States	PNC Bank Arts Center	Cody Simpson	—	
July 25	Vienna	United States	Filene Center	Cody Simpson	—	
July 26	Erie	United States	Warner Theatre	Cody Simpson	—	
July 27 (Note: This concert is a part of the Wilmington Trust Grandstand Concert Series.)	Harrington	United States	Wilmington Trust Grandstand	Cody Simpson	—	
July 29	Poughkeepsie	United States	Mid-Hudson Civic Center	Alex Goot	—	
July 30 (Note: These concerts are a part of Busch Gardens Live.)	Williamsburg	United States	Royal Palace Theatre	Cody Simpson	—	
July 31	Williamsburg	United States	Royal Palace Theatre	Cody Simpson	—	
August 2 (Note: These concerts are a part of the Starburt Summer Concert Series.)	Agawam	United States	River's Edge Picnic Grove	Cody Simpson	—	
August 3	Cohasset	United States	South Shore Music Circus	Cody Simpson	—	
August 4	Hyannis	United States	Cape Cod Melody Tent	Cody Simpson	—	
August 6 (Note: This concert is a part of Spiedie Fest and Balloon Rally.)	Binghamton	United States	Otsiningo Park	Cody Simpson	—	
August 7 (Note: This concert is a part of Musikfest.)	Bethlehem	United States	Sand Steels Stage at PNC Plaza	Cody Simpson	—	
August 9	Gurnee	United States	Southwest Amphitheatre	Cody Simpson	—	
August 10	Kettering	United States	Fraze Pavilion	Cody Simpson	—	
Total					15,615 / 26,327 (59%)	$573,958

=== Cancelled ===
Date (2011)	City	Country	Venue	Ref.
August 12	Park City	United States	Hartman Arena	
August 13 (Note: This concert would have been a part of Elitch Gardens' Summertime Concert Series.)	Denver	United States	Elitch Gardens Theme Park	
August 14	Beaver Creek	United States	Vilar Performing Arts Center	
August 16	Eagle	United States	Eagle River Pavilion	
August 18 (Note: This concert would have been a part of the Oregon Zoo Summer Concerts.)	Portland	United States	Oregon Zoo Amphitheatre	
August 19	Kennewick	United States	Columbia Park Bandshell	
August 20	Tacoma	United States	Pantages Theater	
August 21 (Note: This concert would have been a part of the Fair at PNE Summer Night Concerts.)	Vancouver	Canada	WestJet Concert Stage	
August 24	Reno	United States	Grand Theatre	
August 26	Davis	United States	Jackson Hall	
August 27	Oakland	United States	Fox Oakland Theatre	
August 31	Alpharetta	United States	Verizon Wireless Amphitheatre	
September 2	St. Augustine	United States	St. Augustine Amphitheatre	
September 3 (Note: This concert would have been a part of the Rays Summer Concert Series.)	St. Petersburg	United States	Tropicana Field	
September 4	Valdosta	United States	All-Star Amphitheater	
September 5	Boca Raton	United States	Mizner Park Amphitheater	
September 16	Henderson	United States	Henderson Pavilion	
September 17 (Note: This concert would have been a part of the End of Summer Concert Series.)	Pomona	United States	Fairplex Park Budweiser Grandstand	
October 9 (Note: This concert would have been a part of the Panama City Beach Concert Series.)	Panama City Beach	United States	Aaron Bessant Park Amphitheater	
October 15 (Note: This concert would have been a part of Table Mountain Concert Series.)	Fresno	United States	Paul Paul Theatre	
October 23 (Note: This concert would have been a part of the Arizona State Fair Concert Series.)	Phoenix	United States	Arizona Veterans Memorial Coliseum	
