= Kissin U =

2010 single by Miranda Cosgrove

Single by Miranda Cosgrove

from the album Sparks Fly
- Released: March 22, 2010
- Recorded: 2009
- Genre: Pop rock
- Length: 3:18
- Label: Columbia
- Songwriters: Lukasz Gottwald; Claude Kelly; Miranda Cosgrove
- Producers: Ammo; Kool Kojak

Miranda Cosgrove singles chronology
"About You Now" (2009)	"Kissin U" (2010)	"Dancing Crazy" (2010)

Music video
- "Kissin U" on YouTube

"Kissin U" is a song by American singer and actress Miranda Cosgrove, released by Columbia Records as the sole single from her debut studio album, Sparks Fly. Cosgrove co-wrote the song with Dr. Luke and Claude Kelly, with production handled by Ammo and Kool Kojak. It was released digitally on March 22, 2010, and to mainstream radio on May 11, 2010.

The song was well received critically and was a moderate chart success. The song is her first to enter the U.S. Mainstream Top 40 chart, where it peaked at number 19. The single peaked at number 54 on the Billboard Hot 100. It also charted in several international music charts, including Germany and Austria. The song appeared on the 2010 compilation album Now That's What I Call Music! 35.

== Background ==
"Kissin U" was first announced in late February 2010. The single was previewed on Ryan Seacrest's radio show, On Air with Ryan Seacrest on March 12, 2010, and was released on digital download format on March 22, 2010. During an interview with MTV about the song, Cosgrove stated that

[...] "The song's about your first love or thinking you're falling in love, so it's just kind of a really happy, sweet song. I did write it about a guy, and I'm afraid he might have heard it and he's going to figure it out!"

During the same interview, Cosgrove stated the song provided her with the inspiration to title her debut album Sparks Fly, saying that "The reason I ended up naming it Sparks Fly [is because] those are the first two words you hear when you pop my album in." The single was released for radio airplay on May 11, 2010. On June 29, 2010 a remix EP containing three remixes of the song was released for digital download.

== Critical reception ==
Idolator.com praised the song and compared it to releases by Kesha, and noted that the song "is a zippy if cookie-cutter pop song—not terribly exciting or risky, but with enough listens you'll find yourself singing along with the chorus." Commonsensemedia praised the song's "purely poppy sounds and Cosgrove's limitless enthusiasm" but was also critical of the song's lyrics.

The song ranked number eighty-eight on Bill Lamb's List of Top 100 Songs of 2010.

== Commercial performance ==
"Kissin U" peaked at number 54 on the US Billboard Hot 100. The song was also a top twenty hit on the US Mainstream Top 40 chart. On January 14, 2011, it was announced that "Kissin U" had been certified gold by Recording Industry Association of America (RIAA) for sales of over 500,000 units. The song peaked at number 67 in Germany and at number 51 in Austria.

== Promotion and performances ==
Cosgrove performed "Kissin U" live at the Nickelodeon Kids' Choice Awards pre-show. On September 6, 2010, she performed "Kissin U" on Today.

== Music video ==
The music video was shot in Santa Monica, California and debuted on March 19, 2010. It was directed by Alan Ferguson. The video shows Cosgrove on the beach singing and walking, to meet her love interest who is a sidewalk artist. They go to his house and she sees all the paintings he has painted, as well as trying to teach her how to draw, and later washing his car in front of her house, she splashes him with the hose and he chases her around the car. Later they are seen at a party where it seems they kiss. When she wakes up that morning she looks out the window to see a drawing of a butterfly with images of her and him in the wings on the sidewalk.

== Track listing ==
- Digital download
1. "Kissin U" – 3:18
- CD and digital download (2-track)
1. "Kissin U" – 3:19
2. "Kissin U" (Mike Rizzo extended club remix) – 5:56
- Digital download (remix EP)
1. "Kissin U" (Jason Nevins radio remix) – 3:11
2. "Kissin U" (Mike Rizzo radio remix) – 3:08
3. "Kissin U" (Smash Mode radio remix) – 3:22

== Charts ==
Chart performance for "Kissin U"
Chart (2010)	Peak position
Austria (Ö3 Austria Top 40)	51
Canada CHR/Top 40 (Billboard)	37
Canada Hot AC (Billboard)	48
Germany (GfK)	67
US Billboard Hot 100	54
US Adult Pop Airplay (Billboard)	36
US Pop Airplay (Billboard)	19

== Certifications ==
Certifications for "Kissin U"
Region	Certification	Certified units/sales
United States (RIAA)	Gold	500,000^{*}
^{*} Sales figures based on certification alone.

== Release history ==
Release dates and formats for "Kissin U"
Region	Date	Format	Version(s)	Label	Ref.
Australia	March 22, 2010	Digital download	Original	Columbia; Sony Music	
Austria	March 22, 2010	Digital download	Original	Columbia; Sony Music	
Canada	March 22, 2010	Digital download	Original	Columbia; Sony Music	
New Zealand	March 22, 2010	Digital download	Original	Columbia; Sony Music	
Switzerland	March 22, 2010	Digital download	Original	Columbia; Sony Music	
United States	March 22, 2010	Digital download	Original	Columbia; Sony Music	
United States	May 11, 2010	Contemporary hit radio	Original	Columbia; Sony Music	
Austria	May 28, 2010	Digital download	Original; Mike Rizzo extended club remix	Columbia; Sony Music	
Germany	May 28, 2010	Digital download	Original; Mike Rizzo extended club remix	Columbia; Sony Music	
Switzerland	May 28, 2010	Digital download	Original; Mike Rizzo extended club remix	Columbia; Sony Music	
United States	June 29, 2010	Digital download	Remix EP	Columbia; Sony Music	
Germany	July 9, 2010	CD	Original; Mike Rizzo extended club remix	Columbia; Sony Music	
