= Miranda Cosgrove =

American actress and producer (born 1993)

- Cosgrove in 2021
- Born: Miranda Taylor Cosgrove; May 14, 1993 (age 33); Los Angeles, California, U.S.
- Education: University of Southern California (BA)
- Occupations: Actress; singer; producer
- Years active: 1996–present
- Awards: Full list
- Musical career
- Genre: Pop
- Instruments: Vocals; guitar
- Labels: Nickelodeon; Columbia

Signature
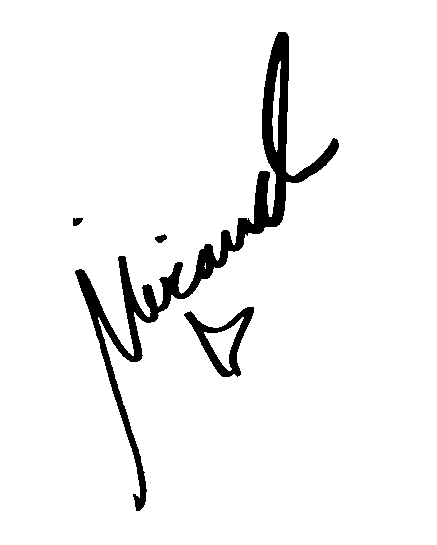

Miranda Taylor Cosgrove (born May 14, 1993) is an American actress, singer, and producer. A teen idol of the 2000s and early 2010s, she was listed as the highest-paid child actor of 2012 by Guinness World Records and appeared on Forbes' "30 Under 30" list in 2022. Her accolades include four Kids' Choice Awards and an Emmy nomination.

Cosgrove began her career at the age of seven, making several appearances in television commercials. She made her acting debut as Summer Hathaway in the film School of Rock (2003). She had her breakout role as Megan Parker on the Nickelodeon sitcom Drake & Josh (2004–2007) and achieved mainstream breakthrough success as Carly Shay on the Nickelodeon sitcom iCarly (2007–2012). She made her musical debut in mid-2008 with the soundtrack for iCarly, in which she performed four songs, including the show's theme song, "Leave It All to Me". In early 2009, she released her debut extended play, About You Now. The following year, she released her debut studio album, Sparks Fly, which peaked at number eight on the Billboard 200 chart while its lead single "Kissin U" peaked at number 54 on the Billboard Hot 100 and was certified gold.

Cosgrove began voicing Margo in the Despicable Me franchise in 2010, which are her highest-grossing films. She released her second extended play, High Maintenance (2011) and embarked on the Dancing Crazy Tour. She starred in the independent films The Intruders (2015), 3022 (2019), and North Hollywood (2021), and hosts the CBS series Mission Unstoppable with Miranda Cosgrove (2019–present). She then reprised her role as Carly Shay in iCarly's Paramount+ revival (2021–2023), which she also executive produced. She has since starred in the films Drugstore June, Mother of the Bride (both 2024) and The Wrong Paris (2025).

== Early life ==
Miranda Taylor Cosgrove was born on May 14, 1993, at Long Beach Memorial Medical Center in Long Beach, California. Her father, Tom Cosgrove, owns a dry-cleaning business, and her mother Chris (née Casey) is a homemaker. She is of Irish, English, French, Mexican, and Ashkenazi Jewish descent. She is an only child and was homeschooled from sixth grade onwards. She struggled with body image during childhood. Before becoming an actress, she wanted to be a veterinarian.

At the age of three, she was discovered by a talent agent while singing and dancing at the Los Angeles restaurant Taste of L.A. Cosgrove says that when the agent approached her and her mother, she had "never really thought of being an actress" and "was lucky". She then appeared in numerous television commercials for McDonald's and Mello Yello, and also modeled for various brands. At the age of seven, she began auditioning for theater and television roles.

== Career ==
=== 2000s ===
Cosgrove's first television appearance was in 2001 when she provided the voice of young Lana Lang in the pilot episode of Smallville. She made her film debut in School of Rock (2003), directed by Richard Linklater. In the movie, she played Summer Hathaway, a young girl with great ambition and discipline who finds herself adjusting to the free-spirited nature of her new music teacher (Jack Black). On working with Black, Cosgrove said that "He just acts [as] the most normal, nice guy. He doesn't seem like he thinks he's Jack Black at all." She also cited the scene in which her character tries to sing as particularly difficult: "[I'd] been taking singing lessons for about five years, so getting to sing badly was new. The director kept saying, 'Try to sing even worse, Miranda,' so it was weird." School of Rock was both a box office hit, grossing over $130 million worldwide, and a critical success. David Ansen of Newsweek described her performance as "spot on".

In 2004, Cosgrove landed her first major role in a television series when she was cast in the Nickelodeon series Drake & Josh, alongside Drake Bell and Josh Peck. In the series, she portrayed Megan Parker, the mischievous younger sister of the title characters. In 2005, Cosgrove was awarded the role of Munch in the Cartoon Network film Here Comes Peter Cottontail: The Movie. In the film, Cosgrove portrays a female mouse who is rescued from a hawk by Junior and Flutter and who goes on to join them on their adventure. Cosgrove also guest-starred on two episodes of the animated comedy, Lilo & Stitch: The Series. She won her second major role in a theatrical film when she cast alongside her Drake & Josh co-star Drake Bell in the comedy film Yours, Mine & Ours. The film performed mildly at the box office. Yours, Mine & Ours opened in third place, earning $17 million at the U.S. box office during its first weekend. Cosgrove's third theatrical release, Keeping Up with the Steins, was released in 2006. It received generally negative reviews from critics and performed poorly at the box office.

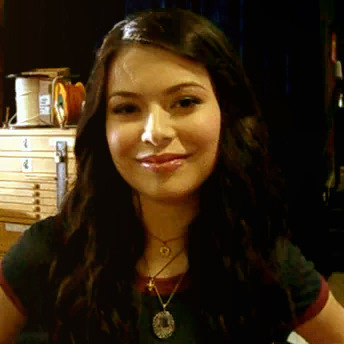
Cosgrove in June 2009

Cosgrove made guest appearances in a number of Nickelodeon series, the first of which was Zoey 101 as Paige Howard. Cosgrove later guest starred on an episode of Unfabulous, which starred Emma Roberts. Cosgrove was then cast as the titular lead character in the sitcom iCarly, which premiered on September 8, 2007. Creator Dan Schneider tailored iCarly around the interest young people have in the internet; viewers could submit their own videos and be included in the sitcom. The final Drake & Josh episode was aired on September 16, 2007. By the summer of 2008, iCarly was the third highest rated series in the 9–14 demographic. The iCarly Saves TV special became the most-viewed entertainment show on cable television in June 2008.

Her debut as a recording artist began with the iCarly theme song "Leave It All to Me", which featured Drake Bell and was released as a single on December 2, 2007. In June 2008, Columbia Records released the iCarly soundtrack, which featured four songs performed by Cosgrove and debuted at number one on the Billboard Kid Albums chart. "Stay My Baby" was released as a promotional single from the album. In December 2008, a cover of the Christmas song "Christmas Wrapping" was released to promote the two hour-long film Merry Christmas, Drake & Josh. On January 28, 2009, Cosgrove released "About You Now" as the lead single from her upcoming debut extended play of the same name, that was released on February 3, 2009. "About You Now" peaked at number 47 on the Billboard Hot 100. To promote the 2009 animated film Cloudy with a Chance of Meatballs, Columbia Records released the promotional single "Raining Sunshine" with an accompanying music video in August 2009. Cosgrove became one of MTV's Female Pop Rookies of 2009. The same year, Cosgrove had a role in the straight-to-DVD film The Wild Stallion (2009).

=== 2010s ===
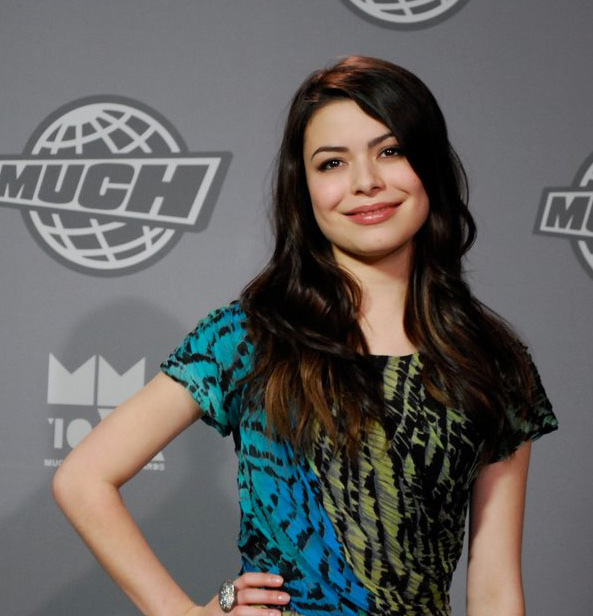
Cosgrove at the 2010 MuchMusic Video Awards

On March 17, 2010, it was reported that Cosgrove signed a deal, reportedly in the "low- to mid-seven-figure range" to do 26 additional episodes of iCarly. Cosgrove also voiced Margo in the Universal Studios animated feature Despicable Me, released in July 2010. In 2010, Cosgrove worked with songwriters The Matrix, Dr. Luke, Max Martin, Leah Haywood and Daniel James for her debut studio album, Sparks Fly. "Kissin U" was released as the sole single from Sparks Fly and premiered on Ryan Seacrest's radio show on March 12, 2010. "Kissin U" became Cosgrove's best-selling single release, peaking at number 54 on the Billboard Hot 100 and being certified gold. Sparks Fly was released in April 2010 and peaked at number 8 on the US Billboard 200 chart. In March 2011, Cosgrove released her follow-up EP High Maintenance. It was preceded by the single "Dancing Crazy", which was written by Max Martin, Shellback and Avril Lavigne, and produced by Martin and Shellback. The single peaked on the Billboard Hot 100 at number 100.

On January 24, 2011, she embarked on the Dancing Crazy Tour. The tour began in Missouri, traveled throughout the United States, and ended in Ohio. On July 15, 2011, the tour continued with the title, Dancing Crazy Summer Tour; Cosgrove traveled the United States and Canada and performed at music festivals and state fairs. On May 17, 2012, it was announced that iCarly's sixth season would be its last. The series finale, "iGoodbye", aired on November 23, 2012. On January 24, 2012, Cosgrove was featured on the iCarly soundtrack, iCarly: iSoundtrack II. Following the filming of iCarly's finale in June 2012, Cosgrove embarked on a new tour dubbed the Summer Tour in July and August 2012.

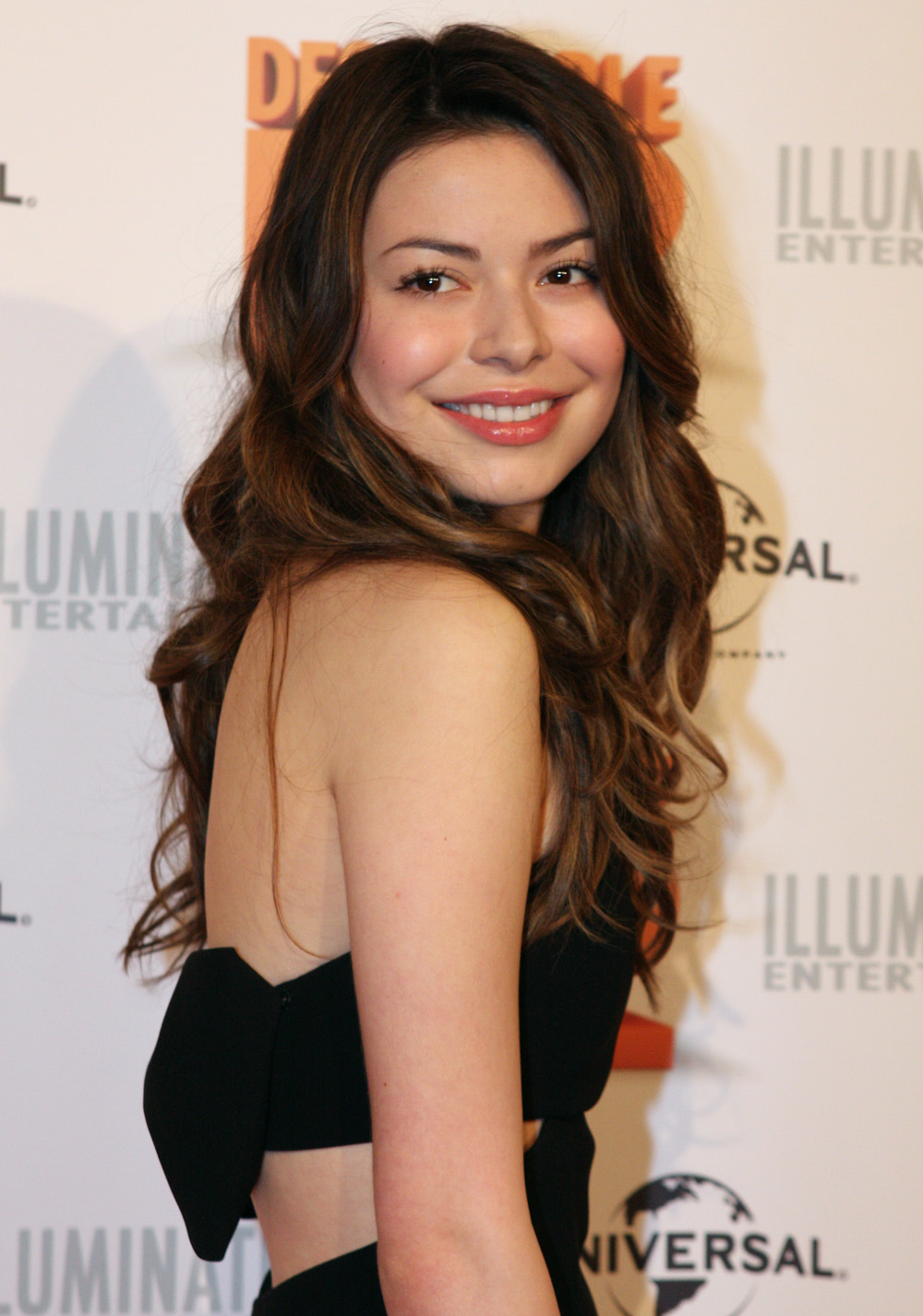
Cosgrove in June 2013

On February 15, 2013, Deadline reported that Cosgrove would star in Girlfriend in a Coma, a television series written by Liz Brixius for NBC and adapted from the novel of the same title by Douglas Coupland. However, following production difficulties, the project was canceled. Cosgrove again voiced Margo in Despicable Me 2, released on June 5. In 2013, she appeared in the animated short films Training Wheels as Margo and Gru's Girls as Savana. In December, she announced on The Today Show that she was recording a new album. In 2014, Cosgrove performed voice work in the animated film A Mouse Tale, which was released on DVD on February 10, 2015. Cosgrove also starred in the horror film The Intruders with Austin Butler, portraying the role of Rose Halshford. She was cast in the NBC sitcom Crowded, which aired from March 15 to May 22, 2016.

In 2017, Cosgrove reprised her role as Margo once again in Despicable Me 3, which was released on June 14, 2017. In 2019, she appeared in the limited budget Netflix science fiction film 3022. Since 2019, she has been the host of Mission Unstoppable with Miranda Cosgrove, a show which airs on CBS and earned the actress a Daytime Emmy Award nomination in 2020.

=== 2020s ===
In 2021, Cosgrove played Rachel in the independent film North Hollywood. She reprised her role as Carly Shay in an iCarly revival, which premiered on Paramount+ in June 2021, and ran for three seasons until July 2023. She additionally served as an executive producer for the series, on which Cosgrove stated "I knew from a really young age how the executive producer of the show pretty much got to decide almost every aspect, now I get to have a say in everything." The first season received a 100% rating on Rotten Tomatoes. She won the award for Favorite Female TV Star at the 2022 Kids' Choice Awards, marking her second win from the association. Cosgrove told Yahoo! Lifestyle in 2022 that she has no plans to return to music.

Cosgrove had a role in the comedy film Drugstore June, which earned a limited theatrical release in February 2024. She next starred in the Netflix film Mother of the Bride opposite Brooke Shields, which was released in May 2024. Of her experience with the film, Cosgrove said that "all the people in this movie were so nice, from the crew to all the actors. It couldn't have come at a more perfect moment in my life." While Mother of the Bride received mixed reviews, Amy Amatangelo of Paste believed Cosgrove "shines" in the film's emotional moments, and Courtney Howard of Variety called her performance "nuanced" and "thoughtful". Cosgrove then reprised the role of Margo in Despicable Me 4, which was released in July 2024. In October 2026, Cosgrove, along with Edi Patterson and Ali Wong, was set to guest star in an Abbott Elementary episode.

== Media image ==
Cosgrove is considered a teen idol of the 2000s and early 2010s, both for her Nickelodeon roles and her musical career. She found this challenging, telling People magazine that "when you're a little kid and someone's calling you a role model, it's like, 'Oh no, I don't want to let anyone down,' but you also aren't fully formed and you don't really know how to be a role model. So there are nice things about it but it's also challenging." On how she is perceived in the media, Cosgrove told Bustle that "there's still a little part of me that's like, 'It'd be nice if people could see me in a different light.' I like my little bubble and my life, so I'm torn a lot because I'm like, how much should I put out there on social media? How much should I really want people to know about me? Maybe it's nice that I just have one thing people think of me [for], and at least it's a nice thing, and then I can live my life on the inside."

Cosgrove was chosen by Common Sense Media as the role model of 2011, being the youngest artist honored at the time. In the 2012 edition of the Guinness World Records, Cosgrove was listed as the highest paid child actress. Cosgrove was included on Forbes magazine's "30 Under 30" list in 2022.

Cosgrove hosted the 2022 Kids' Choice Awards alongside Rob Gronkowski. She appeared on Whitney Cummings' Good for You podcast in 2020, and a clip of her cursing went viral on TikTok two years later in 2022.

== Personal life ==
Cosgrove graduated from the University of Southern California with a degree in psychology. She is an active supporter of St. Jude Children's Research Hospital in Memphis, Tennessee. She also visits other children's hospitals and considers Education Through Music one of her favorite charities. She is a national spokesperson for Light the Night Walk, an organization that creates awareness for blood cancer.

In 2014, Cosgrove was granted a restraining order from a Los Angeles court against a stalker who had allegedly followed her, sent her unsolicited gifts and threatened suicide. The man was subsequently arrested for violating that order and sentenced to three years of probation.

On December 16, 2016, a man shot at a woman in a car near Cosgrove's home in Outpost Estates before lighting himself on fire and shooting himself in Cosgrove's yard. The man was found dead at the scene.

== Filmography ==
=== Film ===
Year	Title	Role	Notes
2003	School of Rock	Summer Hathaway	
2005	Yours, Mine & Ours	Joni North	
2006	Greatest Ever Comedy Movies	Herself	Documentary
2006	Khan Kluay	Kon Suay	Voice role; English dub
2006	Keeping Up with the Steins	Karen Sussman	
2009	The Wild Stallion	Hannah Mills	
2010	Despicable Me	Margo	Voice role
2010	Despicable Me: Home Makeover	Margo	Voice role; short film
2011	Our Deal	Night Creepers	Short film
2013	Despicable Me 2	Margo	Voice role
2013	Despicable Me: Training Wheels	Margo	Voice role; short film
2015	A Mouse Tale	Samantha	Voice role
2015	The Intruders	Rose Halshford	
2017	Despicable Me 3	Margo	Voice role
2019	Despicable Me: Minion Scouts	Margo	Voice role; short film
2019	3022	Lisa Brown	
2021	North Hollywood	Rachel	
2024	Drugstore June	Kelly	
2024	Mother of the Bride	Emma	
2024	Despicable Me 4	Margo	Voice role
2025	The Wrong Paris	Dawn	Also executive producer

=== Television ===
Year	Title	Role	Notes
2001	Smallville	Young Lana Lang	Episode: "Pilot"
2004	Grounded for Life	Jessica	Episode: "You Better You Bet"
2004–2007	Drake & Josh	Megan Parker	Main role
2005	Lilo & Stitch: The Series	Sarah	Voice role; episode: "Morpholomew"
2005	What's New, Scooby-Doo?	Miranda Wright	Voice role; episode: "A Terrifying Round with a Menacing Metallic Clown"
2005	All That	Herself	Episode: "10th Anniversary Reunion Special"
2005	Here Comes Peter Cottontail: The Movie	Munch	Voice role; television film
2006	Drake & Josh Go Hollywood	Megan Parker	Television film
2007	Zoey 101	Paige Howard	Episode: "Paige at PCA"
2007	Just Jordan	Lindsey Chandler	Episode: "Piano Stressin"
2007	Unfabulous	Cosmina	Episode: "The Talent Show"
2007–2012	iCarly	Carly Shay	Lead role
2008	The Naked Brothers Band	Herself	Episode: "Mystery Girl: Part Two"
2008	Merry Christmas, Drake & Josh	Megan Parker	Television film
2010	7 Secrets with Miranda Cosgrove	Herself	Television documentary
2010	The Good Wife	Sloan Burchfield	Episode: "Bad Girls"
2010	Big Time Rush	Herself	Episode: "Big Time Christmas"
2016	Crowded	Shea Moore	Main role
2019–present	Mission Unstoppable	Host	Educational series; also executive producer
2020	The Goldbergs	Elana Reid	Episode: "Preventa Mode"
2020	Minions Holiday Special	Narrator	Voice role; television special
2021–2023	iCarly	Carly Shay	Lead role; also executive producer
2026	Abbott Elementary	Natalie Scott	Episode: "Tryouts"

=== Video games ===
Year	Title	Role	Notes
2007	Drake & Josh: The Video Game	Megan Parker	Character design
2007	Drake & Josh: Talent Showdown	Megan Parker	Character design
2009	iCarly	Carly Shay	Voice role
2010	iCarly 2: iJoin the Click!	Carly Shay	Voice role

== Discography ==
- Sparks Fly (2010)

== Tours ==
- Dancing Crazy Tour (2011)
- Summer Tour (2012)

== Awards and nominations ==
Cosgrove has won two Young Artist Awards and three Kids' Choice Awards, and was nominated for a Daytime Emmy Award. She has won various awards in recognition for her public image.
