= Dancing Crazy =

2010 single by Miranda Cosgrove

Single by Miranda Cosgrove

from the EP High Maintenance
- Released: December 21, 2010
- Studio: Maratone, Stockholm
- Genre: Bubblegum; pop-punk; synth-pop; new wave; rock
- Length: 3:40
- Label: Columbia
- Songwriters: Shellback; Max Martin; Avril Lavigne
- Producers: Max Martin; Shellback

Miranda Cosgrove singles chronology
"Kissin U" (2010)	"Dancing Crazy" (2010)

Music video
- "Dancing Crazy" on YouTube

"Dancing Crazy" is a song by American singer and actress Miranda Cosgrove from her second extended play High Maintenance (2011). It was released as the lead single from the extended play on December 21, 2010, by Columbia Records. The song was written by Avril Lavigne and its producers Shellback and Max Martin. According to Cosgrove, the song is about friendship and having fun.

The song was met with mixed reviews from music critics, who praised the track as a fun, catchy dance track while others dismissed it as unoriginal and forgettable. In the United States, the single peaked on the Billboard Hot 100 at number 100. It was moderately successful in some countries, such as Slovakia, where it peaked at number seventeen. The song's music video debuted on February 13 and features Cosgrove and her friends sneaking out and going to a party that is taking place on a high school football field.

== Background ==
In October 2010, Cosgrove announced new tour dates for the Sparks Fly Tour which was later renamed to the Dancing Crazy Tour. "Dancing Crazy" was released for digital download on December 21, 2010.

"Dancing Crazy" was written by Avril Lavigne, Max Martin, and Shellback, and produced by the latter two.

== Composition ==
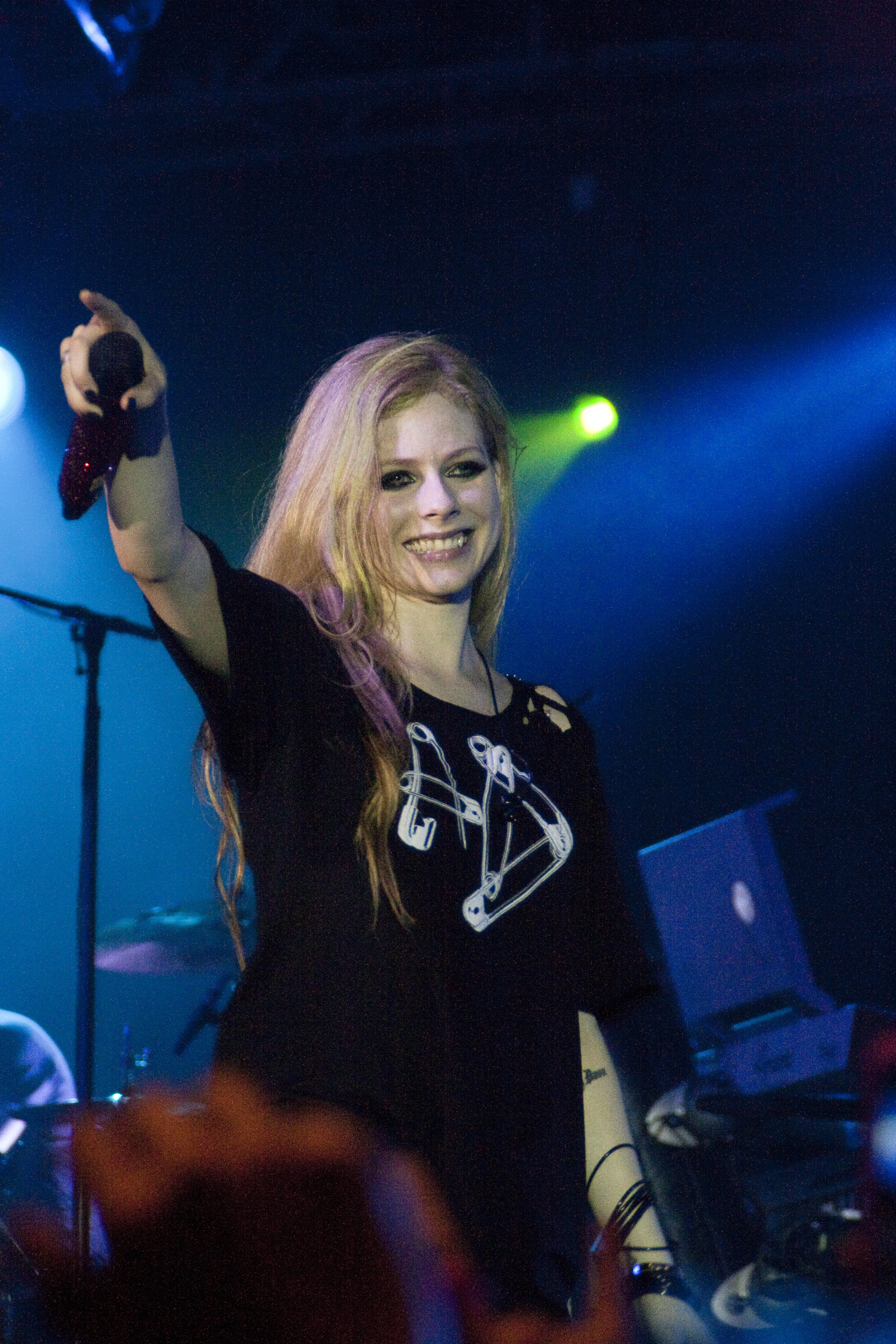
Avril Lavigne wrote the song, about dancing through the night.

The single is written in a common verse-chorus style. The song closes with the ending word "Smack". During a Behind the Scenes look at the recording of the song, Cosgrove stated,

"Dancing Crazy is so fun. I just think about going out with my friends and going to parties and having a good time. [One of my] favorite parts of the song is when is when I say 'I know whatever happens, you will be right by my side'. It's just like, you know you'll always have your friends there."

Commonsensemedia wrote, "Dancing Crazy, ... has one thing on its mind: cutting loose on the dance floor until the wee hours of the morning. Written by Avril Lavigne, the song describes staying out all night, spending most of it dancing (with a little kissing thrown in) – "You, me in the spotlight / Running around till the end of the night / Hot, hot keep it comin' / We can rock out till the early morning." Though the actions in this tune aren't necessarily irresponsible, they may be a little iffy for the youngest tweens."

"Dancing Crazy" has been described as bubblegum pop-punk, synthpop, new wave and rock song with a similar composition to What the Hell by Avril Lavigne.

== Reception ==
=== Critical reception ===
The song was met with mixed reviews from critics. Idolator said of the song "Poppy! Fun! Kinda 80s Bananarama-ish! The "You! Me! In the spotlight!" bit in particular sounds like "Girlfriend"-esque Avril, not to mention the low-key guitar on the bridge. We're guessing this tune didn't make the cut of Lavigne's upcoming album Goodbye Lullaby and Miranda snatched up her scraps. Still, even as leftovers, it's a pretty tasty track and much like she did with Kesha's 'Disgusting', Miranda can pull it off." Common Sense Media gave the song 3 out of 5 stars, saying, "Ultimately, it's hard to tell this song apart from the sea of similar-sounding tunes out there, making it a fairly forgettable track overall."

=== Commercial performance ===
In the US, the song peaked on the Billboard Hot 100 at number 100. It peaked at number thirty-six on the Pop Songs chart and on the Billboard Top Heatseekers chart at number twenty-one. In Slovakia, it debuted and peaked at number seventeen on the official Hot 100 singles chart.

== Live performances ==
The song was first performed live on the Dancing Crazy Tour, which began in January 2011. The song was the fourteenth and final track to be performed on the tour. The song was performed live on the March 9, 2011, episode of The Ellen DeGeneres Show. As Cosgrove started to sing the final chorus of the song, Greyson Chance, who had opened up for her on her Dancing Crazy Tour, appeared on stage to sing with her. On March 15, the day of the EP's release, Cosgrove performed the song at the Hard Rock Cafe in Hollywood, California. During the Dancing Crazy Summer Tour, Cosgrove again performed the song with Chance.

== Music video ==
The music video for "Dancing Crazy" was first announced during Cosgrove's interview on Today. While there, she also showed a snippet of the music video. During a Behind the Scenes look, Cosgrove stated:

"Basically, in the video, I'm sneaking out of the house with my friends in this cool vintage red car. As we're driving, other cars show up behind us and other people that are our friends follow. And we all wind up at this high school. We sneak into the Football Field and just have this big party. Dancing Crazy is just about going out and having a good time. One of my best friends in the world is in the video, and it's gonna be fun, just dancing with her and having fun."

The video opens up to several girls waiting for Cosgrove outside of her house. It is 11:00 pm; Cosgrove gets out of bed and sneaks outside. As the group leaves, Cosgrove sees her teenage neighbor and the two briefly smile at one another. Cosgrove and her friends drive down a road and several other cars filled with teenagers are following them. They arrive at a high school football field, where a car and large speakers have been set up. The teens begin to dance with one another. Cosgrove sits on the car and the neighbor that Cosgrove saw previously arrives. Cosgrove and her neighbor walk to bleachers and hold hands; they later kiss and dance. Sprinklers turn on and the teens run back home. Cosgrove drives back home with her friends as the sun begins to rise. Cosgrove arrives home and lays down; her alarm clock goes off. The video closes with her pressing the snooze button.

== Track listing ==
Digital download / promotional CD single

1. "Dancing Crazy" – 3:43

== Credits and personnel ==
Credits and personnel are adapted from the High Maintenance extended play liner notes.

- Shellback – writer, producer, recording, drums, guitars, bass
- Max Martin – writer, producer, recording, keyboards
- Avril Lavigne – writer
- Serban Ghenea – mixing
- Michael Ilbert – engineering
- Miranda Cosgrove – vocals
- John Hanes – mixing engineer
- Tim Roberts – assistant mixing engineer

== Charts ==
Weekly chart performance for "Dancing Crazy"
Chart (2011)	Peak position
Japan (Japan Hot 100)	56
Slovakia (Singles Digital Top 100)	17
US Billboard Hot 100	100
US Pop Airplay (Billboard)	36

== Release history ==
Country	Date	Format	Label
Canada	December 21, 2010	Digital download	Nickelodeon; Columbia
United States	December 21, 2010	Digital download	Nickelodeon; Columbia
