= High Maintenance (Miranda Cosgrove EP) =

EP by Miranda Cosgrove
- Released: March 15, 2011
- Recorded: 2010–2011
- Genres: Pop; electropop
- Length: 16:08
- Labels: Columbia; Epic
- Producers: Josh Alexander; Rivers Cuomo; Scott Cutler; Greg Kurstin; Max Martin; Mozella McDonald; Anne Preven; Lucas Secon; Shellback

Miranda Cosgrove chronology
Sparks Fly (2010)	High Maintenance (2011)

Singles from High Maintenance
- 1. "Dancing Crazy" Released: December 21, 2010

High Maintenance is the second extended play by American actress and singer Miranda Cosgrove. It was released on March 15, 2011 by Columbia and Epic Records. The EP was preceded by the release of its lead single, "Dancing Crazy", which was co-written by Avril Lavigne and produced by Max Martin and Shellback. The single peaked at number 100 on the Billboard Hot 100 chart in the United States. Musically, High Maintenance mainly incorporates the pop genre with electropop influences.

High Maintenance received mixed to positive reviews from music critics, with many complimenting the EP's sound and production as more adult than Cosgrove's previous teen pop-oriented releases. However, others maintained that Cosgrove and her music lacked originality. The EP was promoted mainly through touring and live promotional appearances on television, including the Dancing Crazy Tour.

== Background and development ==
In October 2010, Cosgrove announced new tour dates for the Sparks Fly Tour, in support of her debut full-length studio album of the same name. It was later renamed the Dancing Crazy Tour, named after her single "Dancing Crazy". On January 11, 2011, Cosgrove tweeted a picture from the photoshoot of the EP. In an interview with Billboard, Cosgrove revealed the title of the EP to be High Maintenance, named after the track of the same name, which is a duet with Rivers Cuomo that was co-written by Cuomo, along with Billy Steinberg and Josh Alexander, and produced by Alexander and Cuomo.

"It's the first duet I've ever done, and it was really fun. My part of the song is this girl who's high maintenance, and Rivers is this guy who's having to put up with it. I really enjoyed working with (Cuomo). He's really cool. I've worked with Dr. Luke for awhile [sic]... and he ended up introducing me to Rivers.

— Cosgrove about new EP and collaboration with Rivers Cuomo"

Along with the first two confirmed tracks, three more songs were confirmed for the EP which were: the electropop song "Sayonara" that was co-written by Greg Kurstin, Nicole Morier, and Bonnie McKee, and produced by Kurstin, a cover of the Shontelle ballad "Kiss You Up" that was produced by Mozella, who co-wrote it with Jimmy Harry and Tony Kanal, and "Face of Love", which was co-written by Scott Cutler, Carsten Mortenson, Anne Preven and Lucas Secon, who produced it.

== Composition ==
The EP's sound is pop music. The EP's lead single, "Dancing Crazy", was reviewed by Common Sense Media: "Dancing Crazy, [...] has one thing on its mind: cutting loose on the dance floor until the wee hours of the morning. [...] Though the actions in this tune aren't necessarily irresponsible, they may be a little iffy for the youngest tweens." Hiponline said of the album, "The High Maintenance EP is a pop-rock whirlwind, complete with sing-along choruses, candy-coated vocals and dance floor friendly beats." They later went on to say "Title track 'High Maintenance' sees Miranda trading tongue-in-cheek vocals about her carefree, fun-loving ways with Rivers Cuomo, who contributed as a songwriter and producer to the track. From the sentimental ballad 'Kiss You Up' to the explosive, electronic 'Sayonara' this album shows Miranda's true versatility as an artist embracing multiple styles and influences."

== Promotion ==
Cosgrove headlined the Dancing Crazy Tour, which was named after the EP's lead and only single "Dancing Crazy". The tour began January 24, 2011 and ended February 25, 2011. The tour featured dates in House of Blues locations. Accompanying Cosgrove on the tour was Greyson Chance

During the week before the EP's release, the music video for "Dancing Crazy" was available for free digital download on iTunes. Aside from being performed while on tour, the song was also performed live on the March 9, 2011 episode of The Ellen DeGeneres Show. As Cosgrove started to sing the final chorus of the song, Greyson Chance came onto the stage to sing with her. On March 15, 2011, the day of the EP's release, Cosgrove performed at the Hard Rock Cafe in Hollywood, California. The first 500 customers to purchase the EP from FYE or the performance at the Hard Rock Cafe received a free wristband, which grants them access to an album signing held by Cosgrove.

Nickelodeon also aired the television special Dancing Crazy With Miranda Cosgrove on Saturday, March 19, 2011. The special showed footage of Cosgrove recording the single as well as its music video. It also showed a behind-the-scenes look at her tour.

On April 5, 2011, Cosgrove tweeted that she would be going on tour again in the summer. Greyson Chance again opened up for her on the North American part of the tour.

On August 11, 2011, Cosgrove's tour bus was involved in a traffic collision on Interstate 70 in Vandalia, Illinois. Five passengers were injured including Cosgrove, who sustained a broken ankle. Initial reports confirmed that the tour would be postponed while Cosgrove recovered. A week later, Cosgrove released a statement stating that the tour was canceled by the doctor's orders. Cosgrove admitted that she would resume touring by the following year.

The tracks on High Maintenance were released on the Japanese edition of Cosgrove's debut album Sparks Fly.

=== Single ===
"Dancing Crazy" is the EP's lead and only single, co-written by Avril Lavigne with Max Martin and Shellback, who produced it. The song was released for digital download on December 21, 2010, while the music video was released onto Nickelodeon on February 13, 2011. It featured Cosgrove and her love interest at a party on a high school football field. In the US, it peaked at number 36 on the Billboard Pop Songs chart. On the Top Heatseekers chart, it debuted and peaked at number 21. It peaked on the Billboard Hot 100 at 100.

== Critical reception ==
Professional ratings
Review scores
Source	Rating
AllMusic	2.5/5 stars
Boston Herald	(Positive)
Entertainment Weekly	(B+)
USA Today	2.5/5 stars
The Washington Post	(Mixed)

Upon its release, High Maintenance was met with mixed to positive reviews. James Christopher Monger of Allmusic wrote that the extended play (EP) had a more adult pop sound, and gave the album a rating of two and a half stars out of five. Lauren Carter of The Boston Herald compared the EP to the likes of Avril Lavigne and Kesha and commented "High Maintenance is mostly high-octane fun, Cosgrove's all-grown-up soundtrack to letting loose and testing the rules without breaking them." Mikael Wood of Entertainment Weekly said that Cosgrove's return to music is stronger than before. Allison Stewart of The Washington Post gave a mixed view of the EP, stating, "Cosgrove's new EP, High Maintenance will sound familiar to anyone who heard her modestly received, similar-sounding 2010 full-length debut, Sparks Fly or any other teen pop disc released in the last five years." However, the editors for USA Today gave the EP a negative review, noting, "She has been singing since the start of Nickelodeon's iCarly, but Cosgrove's new electro-inspired EP is the first release to distinguish the 17-year-old from the show's lead character. But the break's not too sharp."

== Commercial performance ==
The EP debuted at number 34 on the Billboard 200 chart in the US.

== Track listing ==
No.	Title	Writer(s)	Producer(s)	Length
1.	"Dancing Crazy"	Shellback; Max Martin; Avril Lavigne	Martin; Shellback	3:40
2.	"High Maintenance" (featuring Rivers Cuomo)	Billy Steinberg; Rivers Cuomo; Josh Alexander	Alexander; Cuomo	3:09
3.	"Face of Love"	Lucas Secon; Carsten Mortensen; Scott Cutler; Anne Preven	Secon; Cutler^{[a]}; Preven^{[a]}	3:32
4.	"Kiss You Up"	Jimmy Harry; Tony Kanal; Mozella McDonald	McDonald	3:06
5.	"Sayonara"	Greg Kurstin; Nicole Morier; Bonnie McKee	Kurstin	2:41
Total length:				16:08

Bonus
No.	Title	Length
6.	"High Maintenance" (video)	8:31

Note

- ^{^[a]} – Main and vocal production
- "Kiss You Up" is a cover of the song by Shontelle, which was released in 2010.

== Charts ==
Weekly chart performance for High Maintenance
Chart (2011)	Peak position
US Billboard 200	34
