= Jake Zyrus discography =

Filipino singer

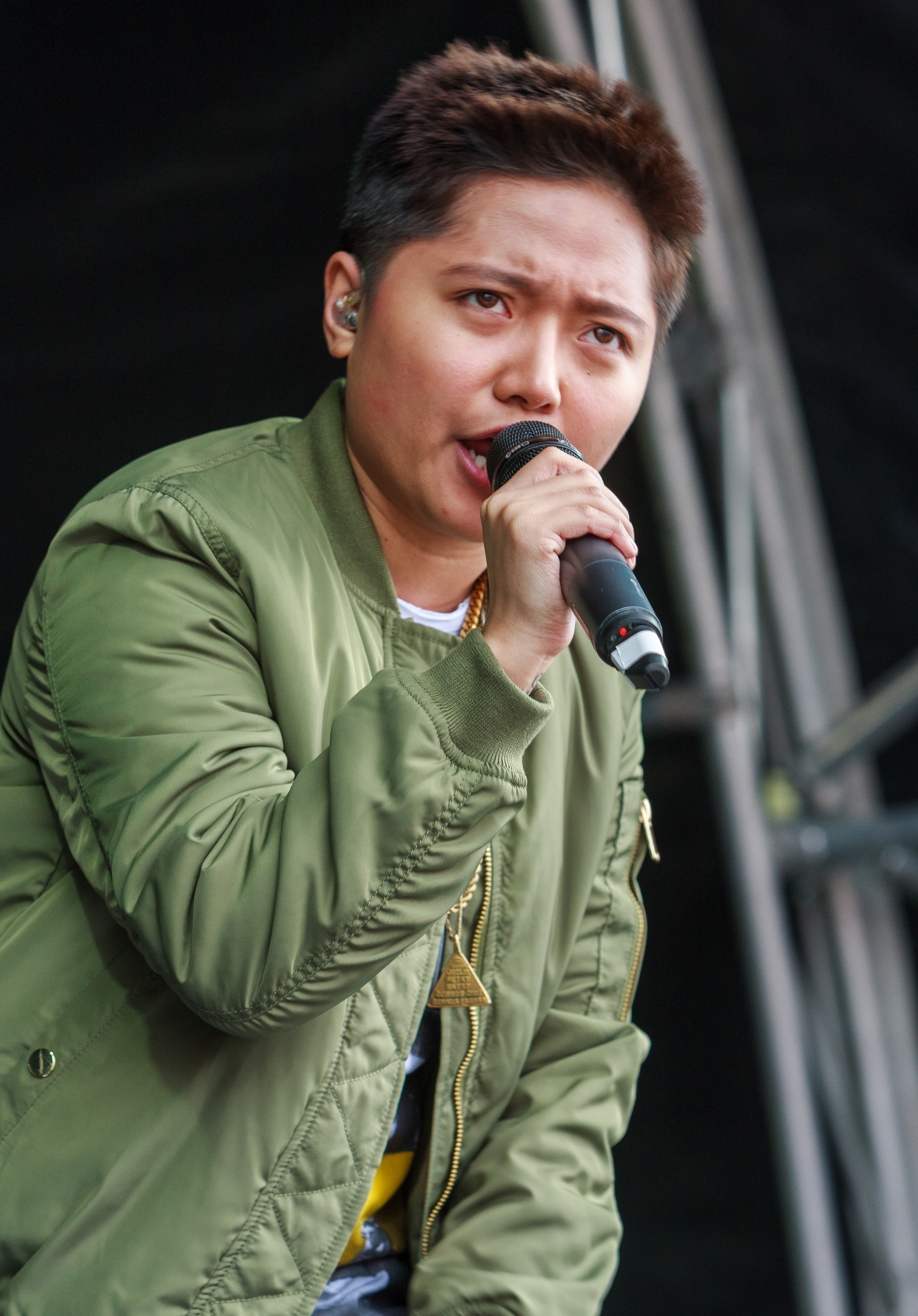
- Studio albums: 5
- Extended plays: 3
- Singles: 15
- Music videos: 8

The discography of Jake Zyrus, a Filipino singer, consists of five studio albums, three extended plays (EP), fifteen singles, and eight music videos. Jake recorded under the name Charice before coming out in 2017 as a transgender man. He was the first Asian solo artist to reach the top 10 of Billboard 200 chart. Forbes listed him among the most influential singers in Asia. Guinness World Records recognized him as the world's "youngest winning judge".

In 2008, Zyrus released his debut EP under Star Records entitled Charice, which was certified platinum. In 2009, he released his first full studio album, the Philippines-exclusive My Inspiration, which was also certified platinum.

On the May 18 episode "Finale: Oprah's Search for the World's Most Talented Kids" of The Oprah Winfrey Show, he debuted his first internationally released single "Note to God", written by Diane Warren and produced by David Foster. The single was made available for digital download on the same day and debuted at number 44 on the Billboard Hot 100, and number 35 on the Canadian Hot 100 chart. He released the single for his international debut album, "Pyramid", which featured rapper, Iyaz. It became his most successful single to date, charting within the top 40 in a number of countries, and also debuted on The Oprah Winfrey Show, where he sang live.

He released his first international studio album, Charice in 2010. The album entered the Billboard 200 at number eight. In late 2010, he released an extended play titled Grown-Up Christmas List.

In 2011, Jake began working on his second international album, Infinity, collaborating with various artists. "Before It Explodes" was released as the lead single from the album, written by Peter Gene Hernandez (Bruno Mars) and Ari Levine of The Smeezingtons, who produced it. According to Billboard magazine, "Louder" was the album's second single, released in May 2011.

== Albums ==
List of albums, with selected chart positions and certifications
Title	Album details	Peak chart positions				Certifications
Title	Album details	CAN	JPN	KOR	US	Certifications
Credited as Charice
My Inspiration (Note: My Inspiration was only released in the Philippines.)	Released: April 3, 2009; Label: Star; Formats: CD, digital download	—	—	—	—	PARI: Gold
Charice	Released: May 11, 2010; Label: 143, Reprise; Formats: CD, digital download	4	6	25	8	RIAJ: Platinum; TECA: Gold
Infinity (Note: Infinity was only released in Asia.)	Released: October 5, 2011; Label: 143, Reprise; Formats: CD, digital download	—	8	—	—	
Chapter 10 (Note: Chapter 10 was only released in the Philippines.)	Released: September 6, 2013; Label: Star; Formats: CD, digital download	—	—	—	—	PARI: Gold
Catharsis (Note: Catharsis was only released in the Philippines.)	Released: October 7, 2016; Label: Star; Formats: CD, digital download	—	—	—	—	
"—" indicates the album did not chart or was not released on that chart.

== Extended plays ==
List of extended plays, with certifications
Title	Details	Certifications
Credited as Charice
Charice (Note: Charice was only released in the Philippines.)	Released: May 1, 2008; Label: Star; Formats: CD, digital download	PARI: Gold
Grown-Up Christmas List	Released: November 30, 2010; Label: 143, Reprise; Formats: CD, digital download	
Credited as Jake Zyrus
Evolution	Released: September 4, 2019; Label: Star Music; Formats: CD, digital download	

== Singles ==
=== As lead artist ===
List of singles as lead artist, with selected chart positions and certifications, showing year released and album name
Title	Year	Peak chart positions									Certifications	Album
Title	Year	AUS	CAN	IRE	JPN	KOR	NLD	UK	US	US Dance	Certifications	Album
Credited as Charice
"It Can Only Get Better" (Note: Released as a commercial single only in the Philippines.)	2008	—	—	—	—	—	—	—	—	—		Charice (EP)
"Always You"	2009	—	—	—	—	—	—	—	—	—		My Inspiration
"Note to God"	2009	—	35	—	—	—	—	—	44	—		Charice
"Pyramid" (featuring Iyaz)	2010	45	41	21	4	8	53	17	56	1	RIAJ: Gold	Charice
"Crescent Moon" (Note: Released as a commercial single only in Japan.)	2010	—	—	—	—	—	—	—	—	—		Charice
"Before It Explodes"	2011	—	—	—	—	—	—	—	—	—		Infinity
"One Day"	2011	—	—	—	—	—	—	—	—	—		Infinity
"Louder"	2011	—	—	—	34	—	—	—	—	—		Infinity
"Far as the Sky"	2011	—	—	—	29	—	—	—	—	—		Infinity
"New World"	2011	—	—	—	—	—	—	—	—	—		Infinity
Credited as Jake Zyrus
"Hiling"	2017	—	—	—	—	—	—	—	—	—		Evolution (EP)
"I'll Be There for You" (from The Good Son (soundtrack))	2018	—	—	—	—	—	—	—	—	—		Evolution (EP)
"DNM"	2018	—	—	—	—	—	—	—	—	—		Evolution (EP)
"Diamond"	2018	—	—	—	—	—	—	—	—	—		Evolution (EP)
"Love Even If"	2019	—	—	—	—	—	—	—	—	—		Evolution (EP)
"—" indicates the single did not chart or was not released on that chart.

=== As featured artist ===
List of singles as featured artist, with selected chart positions, showing year released and album name
Title	Year	Peak chart positions	Album
Title	Year	US AC	Album
Credited as Charice
"Have Yourself a Merry Little Christmas" (David Archuleta featuring Charice)	2009	22	Christmas from the Heart
"Wherever You Are" (Unique featuring Charice)	2010	—	From Brooklyn to You
"I'm Not Perfect" (Cheesa featuring Charice)	2012	—	Naked
"—" indicates the single did not chart or was not released on that chart.

== Other charted songs ==
Year	Single	Peak chart positions	Album
Year	Single	JPN	Album
Credited as Charice
"Happy Xmas (War Is Over)"	2010	83	Grown-Up Christmas List

== Other appearances ==
Year	Song	Album
2006	"I'll Be There"	Little Big Star
2006	"Awit ng Kabutihang Asal" (with Little Big Star Finalists) (Translation: The Song of Good Deeds)	Little Big Deeds
2006	"Handang Tumulong" (Translation: Ready to Help)	Little Big Deeds
2006	"Sana" (with Little Big Star Finalists) (Translation: How I Wish)	Little Big Deeds
2007	"Smile"	H.O.P.E. (Healing of Pain and Enlightenment)
2008	"A Song for Mama"	Love Life (Life Songs & Life Stories of Boy Abunda)
2008	"The Bodyguard Medley (I Have Nothing/I Will Always Love You)"	Hit Man: David Foster & Friends
2009	"And I Am Telling You (I'm Not Going)"	OPM Number 1's
2009	"It Can Only Get Better"	I Move. I Give. I Love.
2009	"Pilipino, Kaya Natin 'To" (OPM artists)	Pilipino, Kaya Natin 'To
2009	"Note to God"	NOW That's What I Call Music, Vol 31
2009	"Have Yourself a Merry Little Christmas" (David Archuleta featuring Charice)	Christmas from the Heart
2009	"The Christmas Song"	A Very Special Christmas Vol.7
2009	"No One" (The Chipettes featuring Charice)	Alvin and the Chipmunks: The Squeakquel: Original Motion Picture Soundtrack
2010	"Pyramid" (featuring Iyaz)	Nrj Summer Hits Only 2010
2010	"In This Song"	David Foster Presents Love, Again
2010	"Pyramid" (featuring Iyaz)	Now: The Hits of Spring 2010
2010	"Pyramid" (Barry Harris Radio Edit)	Scott Mills Presents Big Ones
2010	"Wherever You Are" (Unique featuring Charice)	From Brooklyn to You
2011	"Pyramid" (featuring Iyaz)	The FINEST Presents BEST HIT R&B – THE HOTTEST R&B HITS AND MEGA MIX
2011	"Earth Song" (with Ne-Yo and Robert Randolph)	Hit Man Returns: David Foster & Friends
2011	"To Love You More"	Hit Man Returns: David Foster & Friends
2011	"All By Myself"	Hit Man Returns: David Foster & Friends
2011	"Wherever You Are" (Unique featuring Charice)	Manhattan Records "The Exclusives" Outlet Hits!! 2 mixed by DJ Motoyosi
2011	"Waiting Outside the Lines (Remix)" (Greyson Chance featuring Charice)	Waiting Outside the Lines (Digital EP)
2012	"Waiting Outside the Lines (Remix)" (Greyson Chance featuring Charice)	Hold On 'til the Night (Special Asia Edition)
2013	"Yakap" (Translation: Embrace)	Muling Buksan Ang Puso Soundtrack

== Music videos ==
Year	Title
2008	"It Can Only Get Better"
2009	"Always You"
2010	"Pyramid" (featuring Iyaz)
2011	"Far As the Sky"
2011	"One Day"
2011	"Louder"
2011	"One Day" (Japanese version)
2017	"Killing Myself to Sleep"
