= Charice (disambiguation) =

Charice is the former stage name of Jake Zyrus (born 1992), Filipino singer.

Charice may also refer to:

- Charice (album), a 2010 studio album
- Charice (EP), a 2008 extended play
- Charice, one of the members of Kaia (group)
