= Portraits (Greyson Chance album) =

2019 studio album

Studio album by Greyson Chance
- Released: March 15, 2019
- Genre: Synth-pop
- Length: 35:28
- Label: AWAL
- Producers: Willy Beaman; Christian Medice; Todd Spadafore

Greyson Chance chronology
Somewhere Over My Head (2016)	Portraits (2019)	Trophies (2021)

Singles from Portraits
- 1. "Shut Up" Released: February 8, 2019; 2. "Timekeeper" Released: March 8, 2019; 3. "Yours" Released: March 21, 2019; 4. "White Roses" Released: August 22, 2019

Portraits is the second studio album by American singer-songwriter Greyson Chance. It is Chance's first full release since Hold On 'til the Night in 2011. The album was released through AWAL Recordings America on March 15, 2019. The album was supported by three singles: "Shut Up", "Timekeeper", and "Yours". Willy Beaman is the primary producer on the album, with Christian Medice and Todd Spadafore individually contributing production on two tracks.

== Track listing ==
All tracks are written by Greyson Chance and Willy Beaman, and produced by Beaman, except where noted.

No.	Title	Writer(s)	Producer(s)	Length
1.	"Shut Up"			2:50
2.	"Bleed You Still"	Chance; Beaman; Josh Zegan		2:38
3.	"Yours"	Chance; Beaman; Jamall Anthony Smith; Nick Bailey		3:46
4.	"Plains"	Chance		0:57
5.	"West Texas"	Chance; Christian Medice	Medice	3:36
6.	"White Roses"			3:56
7.	"Lights"	Chance		0:25
8.	"Black on Black"	Chance; Todd Spadafore; Cole Citrenbaum	Spadafore	3:23
9.	"Seasons Nineteen"			2:48
10.	"Timekeeper"			3:57
11.	"Stand"			3:25
12.	"Lakeshore"			3:47
Total length:				35:28

2026 special edition LP
No.	Title	Length
13.	"Summertrain '25"	4:30
14.	"Waiting Outside the Lines '25"	3:16
Total length:		43:14
