= Truth Be Told, Part 1 =

EP by Greyson Chance
- Released: November 19, 2012
- Recorded: 2011–12
- Genre: Pop rock
- Length: 16:27
- Label: Geffen, eleveneleven
- Producer: Ellen DeGeneres (exec.), The Nexus, Brandon Salaam Bailey, Michael Warren, Toby Gad

Greyson Chance chronology
Hold On 'til the Night (2011)	Truth Be Told, Part 1 (2012)	Somewhere Over My Head (2016)

Singles from "Truth Be Told, Part 1"
- 1. "Sunshine & City Lights" Released: October 2, 2012

Truth Be Told, Part 1 is the first extended play by Greyson Chance. It contains five original songs, and was released on November 19, 2012.

== Background ==
The EP was described by critics as a taste of what was yet to come in his full next length studio album. "I changed it up on this EP and it's very different from Hold On 'til the Night. The idea behind it is that this is what music should be about Truth BeTold," Chance said in an interview with Total Girl Philippines.

== Singles ==
"Sunshine & City Lights" is the lead single off the EP, released on October 2, 2012. The music video premiered on Vevo on November 16, 2012, and was directed by Clarence Fuller.

== Track listing ==
No.	Title	Writer(s)	Producer(s)	Length
1.	"Sunshine & City Lights"	Greyson Chance, James Bauer-Mein and David Sneddon	The Nexus	3:43
2.	"You Might Be the One"	Greyson Chance, Brandon Salaam Bailey, Michael Warren	Brandon Salaam Bailey, Michael Warren	3:23
3.	"Leila"	Greyson Chance, Toby Gad, Lindy Robbins	Toby Gad	2:49
4.	"California Sky"	Greyson Chance, Toby Gad, Lindy Robbins	Toby Gad	2:52
5.	"Take My Heart"	Greyson Chance, Brandon Salaam Bailey, Michael Warren	Brandon Bailey, Michael Warren	3:38
Total length:				16:27

== Release history ==
Country	Release date	Format	Label
Worldwide	October 29, 2012	CD	Geffen Records
Worldwide	November 19, 2012	Digital download	Geffen Records
