= 23rd Awit Awards =

2010 Philippine music awards ceremony

- Date: September 30, 2010
- Location: SM Mall of Asia, Bay City, Pasay
- Hosted by: Tutti Caringal; Yeng Constantino; Karylle
- Preshow hosts: Nicole Hyala; Chris Tsuper

Highlights
- Most awards: Noel Cabangon; Gloc-9 (4)
- Most nominations: Noel Cabangon; Ito Rapadas; Gary Valenciano (9)
- Album of the Year: Byahe by Noel Cabangon
- Song of the Year: "Upuan" by Gloc-9

Television/radio coverage
- Produced by: Bellhaus Entertainment

The 23rd Awit Awards were held on September 30, 2010 at the SM Mall of Asia in Bay City, Pasay. They honored achievements in the Philippine music industry for the year 2009.

Noel Cabangon, Ito Rapadas and Gary Valenciano received the most nominations with nine. They were followed by Jonathan Manalo and Martin Nievera with seven.

The People's Choice Awards was renamed Music Uplate Live Texters' Choice Poll just for this year as sponsored by the television show which its namesake.

Before the awards night, the Music Expo was held in September 28 to 29, which includes music seminars and performances. The pre-show was hosted by radio jocks, Nicole Hyala and Chris Tsuper, while the main ceremony was hosted by Tutti Caringal, Yeng Constantino and Karylle. Noel Cabangon and Gloc-9 won the most awards with four. For the first time in the history of Awit Awards, a rap song won the Song of the Year, which was "Upuan" by Gloc-9.

== Winners and nominees ==
Winners are listed first and highlighted in bold. Nominated producers, composers and lyricists are not included in this list, unless noted. For the full list, please go to their official website.

=== Performance Awards ===
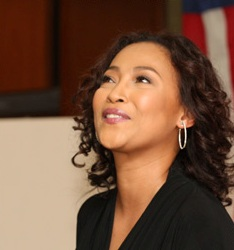
Jaya, Best Female winner

Best Performance by a Female Recording Artist	Best Performance by a Male Recording Artist
**"Hiding inside Myself" – Jaya**; "Himig ng Pag-ibig" – Yeng Constantino; "Right Here Waiting" – Sarah Geronimo; "Single Ladies" – Princess; "Bette Davis Eyes" – Aiza Seguerra	**"Kahit Maputi na ang Buhok Ko" – Noel Cabangon**; "Just Tell Me You Love Me" – Kris Lawrence; "Maybe This Time" – Martin Nievera; "Why Can't It Be" – Gino Padilla; "Naglalambing" – Paolo Santos; "How Can I" – Gary Valenciano
Best Performance by a Group Recording Artists	Best Performance by a New Female Recording Artist
**"Castaway" – Franco**; "Hanggang sa Muli" – Kenyo; "Mr. Musikero" – Sinosikat?; "Parang si Ely Buendia" – Soapdish; "Dangal" – Rivermaya	**"Kasalanan Nga Ba?" – Gretchen Espina**; "Sa Kanya" – Apple Chiu; "Dahil Ikaw ang Mahal Ko" – Hanna Flores; "Dumating Ka" – Martha Joy; "Single Ladies" – Princess
Best Performance by a New Male Recording Artist	Best Performance by a New Group Recording Artists
**"Never Can Say Goodbye" – Rhap Salazar**; **"That Girl" – Young JV**; "I Don’t Wanna Talk About It" – Benj; "Poker Face" – Davey Langit; "Sayang" – Myrus	**"Surf's Up" – Krissy & Ericka**; "Castaway" – Franco; "Ikaw pa Rin" – Letter Day Story; "Lumayo Ka man sa Laklak" – Moymoy Palaboy; "Crazy Crazy" – Pop Girls; "Kaibigang Hangin" – Skabeche
Best Performance by a Child/Children Recording Artist/s	Best Collaboration
**"Never Can Say Goodbye" – Rhap Salazar**; "May Bukas Pa" – Kyle Balili	**"Upuan" – Gloc-9 feat. Jeazell Grutas**; "Miss You Like Crazy" – Dianne Elise feat. Reuben Laurente; "Martilyo" – Gloc-9 feat. Dex Yu; "I Will Take You Forever" – Kris Lawrence feat. Denise Laurel; "As 1" – Martin Nievera & Gary Valenciano

=== Creativity Awards ===
Album of the Year	Song of the Year
**Byahe – Noel Cabangon**; Romance Revisited: The Love Songs of Jose Mari Chan – Christian Bautista; As 1 – Martin Nievera & Gary Valenciano; Unchanging Love – Zsa Zsa Padilla; Aiza Seguerra Live! – Aiza Seguerra	**"Upuan"** **Aristotle Pollisco (composer & lyricist)**; "Always You" Jonathan Manalo (composer & lyricist); "As 1" Gina Godinez (composer) Albert Chan (lyricist); "Lapit" Yeng Constantino (composer & lyricist); "Nung Iniwan Mo Ako" Ebe Dancel (composer & lyricist)
Best Selling Album of the Year	Best Ballad Recording
**Ikaw na Nga – Willie Revillame**	**"Tayong Dalawa" – Gary Valenciano**; "Tell Me Your Name" – Christian Bautista; "Kahit Maputi na ang Buhok Ko" – Noel Cabangon; "Why Can't It Be" – Gino Padilla; "Nung Iniwan Mo Ako" – Sinosikat?
Best Rock/Alternative Recording	Best World Music Recording
**"Martilyo" – Gloc-9 feat. Dex Yu**; "Castaway" – Franco; "Wala" – Kamikazee; "AYT" – Sponge Cola feat. Gary Valenciano; "Hay Buhay" – Sugarfree	**"Binibini" – Noel Cabangon**; "Loko" – Chris Cayzer; "Himig ng Pag-ibig" – Yeng Constantino; "Eres Mio" – Josh Santana; "Kaibigang Hangin" – Skabeche
Best Novelty Recording	Best Inspirational/Religious Recording
**"Lumayo Ka man sa Laklak" – Moymoy Palaboy**; "Politiko" – Richie D'Horsie; "Mahal Kita Kasi" – Nicole Hyala & Chris Tsuper; "Bratatat" – Pokwang; "Mas Mahal na Kita Ngayon" – Young Men	**"Always You" – Charice Pempengco**; "Iukit ang 'Yong Batas" – Noel Cabangon & Bukas Palad Music Ministry; "Saranggola sa Ulan" – Sharon Cuneta; "Nariyan Ka" – Juris; "Now That I Have You – Philippine Madrigal Singers
Best Christmas Recording	Best Rap Recording
**"You Know It’s Christmas" – Hanna Flores**; **"Ganyan ang Pasko" – Toni Gonzaga**; "Tuloy pa Rin ang Pasko" – Nicole Hyala & Chris Tsuper; "Gumising" – Pavi & Tropicalia; "Narito na ang Pasko" – Ariel Rivera; "Star ng Pasko" – ABS-CBN Artists	**"Upuan" – Gloc-9 feat. Jeazell Grutas**; "Nagmahal Ako" – Dagtang Lason; "Meron Akong Ano" – Kamikazee; "Hala Bira" – Pinoy Republic; "That Girl" – Young JV
Best Jazz Recording	Best R&B Recording
**Mr. Musikero" – Sinosikat?**; "From Long Ago" – Johnny Alegre	**"Moments of Love" – Kris Lawrence**; "Kasalanan Nga Ba?" (R&B Version) – Gretchen Espina; "How Do I Make You Love Me?" – Gian Magdangal; "H.S. Romance" – Sinosikat?
Best Song Written for Movie/TV/Stage Play
**"Ang Buhay Nga Naman" (from Ded na si Lolo) – Noel Cabangon**; "Tagumpay" (from Pinoy Fear Factor) – Chivas; "Alay na Alaala" (from The Forgotten War) – Kenyo

=== Technical Achievement Awards ===
Best Musical Arrangement	Best Vocal Arrangement
**"Mr. Musikero" – Philippe Arriola**; "Upuan" – Jonathan Ong; "Tayong Dalawa" – Marvin Querido; "Ang Huling El Bimbo" – Mike Villegas; "Himig ng Pag-ibig" – Paulo Zarate	**"Apologize" – Danny Tan**; "How Did You Know?" – Christopher Borela; "I Will Take You Forever" – Arnold Buena; "Never Can Say Goodbye" – Jonathan Manalo; "He'd Look My Way" – Richard Poon
Best Engineered Recording	Best Album Package
**"Upuan" – Robert Javier & Jonathan Ong**; "Tin Man" – Don Manalang; "Kumot at Unan" – Ferdie Marquez & Efren San Pedro; "Hope for Humanity – Ferdie Marquez & Efren San Pedro; "Gravity" – Angee Rozul; "Kalesa" – Angee Rozul	**Decades** **Patrick Kevin Cabrera IV (graphic design)** **Malou Santos (album concept)** **Raymund Isaac (photography)**; Aiza Seguerra Live! Andrew Castillo (graphic design) Annabelle Borja (album concept) Jojit Lorenzo (photography); Maharlika Mich De Guzman (graphic design) Mich De Guzman & Kenyo (album concept) Carlo Cecilio & Mich De Guzman (photography); Nut House Timothy Wong (graphic design) Hilera, Willie Monzon & Timothy Wong (album concept) Treb Monteras II (photography); The Apparition Inksurge (graphic design & album concept)
Music Video of the Year
**"Diamond Shotgun" – Chicosci** **Pancho Esguerra (director)**; "Kahit Maputi na ang Buhok Ko" – Noel Cabangon Galileo Te (director); "Wag Kang Magtatanong" – Yeng Constantino Avid Liongoren (director); "Gravity" – Urbandub Pancho Esguerra (director); "That Girl" – Young JV Treb Monteras II (director)

=== Digital Awards ===
ABS-CBN Interactive's Most Downloaded Song for 2009	ABS-CBN Interactive's Most Downloaded Artist for 2009
**"Muli" – Bugoy Drilon**	**Bugoy Drilon**
EGG's AllHits.ph Most Downloaded Song for 2009	EGG's AllHits.ph Most Downloaded Artist for 2009
**"O Jo' Kaluguran Daka" – Ara Muna**	**Sarah Geronimo**
myMusic.ph's Most Downloaded Song for 2009	myMusic.ph's Most Downloaded Artist for 2009
**"Teacher's Pet" – Pupil**	**Pupil**

=== Music Uplate Live Texters' Choice Poll ===
Best Performance by a Female Recording Artist	Best Performance by a Male Recording Artist
**"Right Here Waiting" – Sarah Geronimo**; "Himig ng Pag-ibig" – Yeng Constantino; "Hiding inside Myself" – Jaya; "Single Ladies" – Princess; "Bette Davis Eyes" – Aiza Seguerra	**"Just Tell Me You Love Me" – Kris Lawrence**; "Kahit Maputi na ang Buhok Ko" – Noel Cabangon; "Maybe This Time" – Martin Nievera; "Why Can't It Be" – Gino Padilla; "Naglalambing" – Paolo Santos; "How Can I" – Gary Valenciano
Best Performance by a Group Recording Artists	Album of the Year
**"Dangal" – Rivermaya**; "Castaway" – Franco; "Hanggang sa Muli" – Kenyo; "Mr. Musikero" – Sinosikat?; "Parang si Ely Buendia" – Soapdish	**Romance Revisited: The Love Songs of Jose Mari Chan** – **Christian Bautista**; Byahe – Noel Cabangon; As 1 – Martin Nievera & Gary Valenciano; Unchanging Love – Zsa Zsa Padilla; Aiza Seguerra Live! – Aiza Seguerra
Song of the Year
**"Lapit"** **Yeng Constantino (composer & lyricist)**; "Always You" Jonathan Manalo (composer & lyricist); "As 1" Gina Godinez (composer) Albert Chan (lyricist); "Nung Iniwan Mo Ako" Ebe Dancel (composer & lyricist); "Upuan" Aristotle Pollisco (composer & lyricist)

=== Special awards ===
International Achievement Award
Recipient	Achievement
**Rhap Salazar**	The 2009 Junior Grand Champion Performer of the World in the World Championships of Performing Arts.

Special Citation	Posthumous Award	Dangal ng Musikang Pilipino Award
**Paalam, Maraming Salamat, President Corazon C. Aquino**	**Fred Panopio**	**Asin**; **Boy Katindig**; **Sampaguita**

== Performers ==
This is in order of appearance.

Artist(s)	Song(s)
Pre-show
Philippine All Stars	
Letter Day Story	"Sama-sama"
Skabeche	"Awit"
Kyle Balili	"May Bukas Pa"
Aria Clemente	"Malayo pa ang Umaga" (Rey Valera cover)
Sam Concepcion	"Missed You"
Sinosikat?	"Mr. Musikero"
Ogie Alcasid	"Bagong Pilipinas"
Main show
Protein Shake; Kean Cipriano; Ney Dimaculangan; Gloc-9	"Kaya Mo"
Denise Laurel; Kris Lawrence	"I Will (Take You Forever)" (Christopher Cross & Frances Ruffelle cover)
Kyla; Jay R	"Back in Time"
Young JV	"That Girl"
PYT	
Liezel Garcia	"Di Ko Kayang Limutin"
Six Part Invention	"Falling in Love"
Bugoy Drilon	"Hindi na Bale"
General Luna	"Nandito"
Lito Camo; Calzada	"Bulaklak" (Viva Hot Babes cover) "Jumbo Hotdog" (Masculados cover) "Spaghetti Song" (Sexbomb Girls cover)
Carol Banawa	"Iingatan Ka"
Rhap Salazar	
Jay Durias; Yeng Constantino; Sinosikat?	Homage to Dangal ng Musikang Pilipino awardees "I Will Always Stay in Love This Way with You" (Boy Katindig); Unknown (Sampaguita); Unknown (Asin)
Noelle Cassandra; Princess; Sabrina; Aiza Seguerra; Toto Sorioso; Top Suzara; Yael Yuzon	Performance of some past Song of the Year winners "Take Me out of the Dark" (Gary Valenciano/1989) "Yugto" (Rico Blanco/2009) "Rainbow" (South Border/2005) "Forevermore" (Side A/1996) "Kailan" (Smokey Mountain/1991) "Narda" (Kamikazee/2007) "Kailangan Ko'y Ikaw" (Regine Velasquez/2001) "Pagdating ng Panahon" (Aiza Seguerra/2002) "Hallelujah" (Bamboo/2006)
Gloc-9; Yeng Constantino; Aiza Seguerra	"Upuan"
