= Portraits World Tour =

2019–20 concert tour by Greyson Chance

- Tour by Greyson Chance
- Promotional poster for the Portraits World Tour
- Associated album: Portraits
- Start date: July 11, 2019
- End date: January 31, 2020
- Legs: 6
- No. of shows: 54

Greyson Chance concert chronology
- Hold On 'Til the Night Tour (2011–2012); Portraits World Tour (2019–2020); Trophies World Tour (2021–2022)

The Portraits World Tour was the second headlining concert tour by American singer Greyson Chance in support of his second studio album, Portraits. The tour began on July 11, 2019, in Seattle and concluded on January 31, 2020, in Chicago.

== Background and development ==
On June 10, 2019, Chance announced he would be embarking on a six-month world tour. Additional European dates were added due to high demand. Chance added additional European dates on December 11.

== Tour dates ==
List of 2019 concerts
Date	City	Country	Venue
July 11, 2019	Seattle	United States	Neumos
July 12, 2019	Vancouver	Canada	Fox Cabaret
July 13, 2019	San Diego	United States	San Diego Pride Festival
July 27, 2019	Jakarta	Indonesia	The Pallas
September 6, 2019	Columbus	United States	A&F Challenge
September 14, 2019	Nashville	United States	Outloud Festival
September 17, 2019	Taipei	Taiwan	Legacy
September 18, 2019	Hong Kong	China	Music Zone
September 19, 2019	Shenzhen	China	Hou Live
September 20, 2019	Guangzhou	China	T:Union
September 21, 2019	Chongqing	China	Cultural Palace Grand
September 22, 2019	Chengdu	China	Zhengou Art Center
September 26, 2019	Hangzhou	China	Mao Livehouse
September 27, 2019	Shanghai	China	Modern Sky Lab
September 28, 2019	Nanjing	China	Euler Art Space
September 29, 2019	Beijing	China	Candy Line
September 30, 2019	Xi'an	China	Core Space
October 5, 2019	Amsterdam	Netherlands	Paradiso
October 9, 2019	Ghent	Belgium	Charlatan
October 10, 2019	Berlin	Germany	Badehaus
October 11, 2019	Dublin	Ireland	The Academy 2
October 12, 2019	London	England	The Courtyard
October 13, 2019	Oslo	Norway	Parkteatret
October 15, 2019	London	England	The Courtyard
October 16, 2019	Paris	France	1999
October 18, 2019	Glasgow	Scotland	The Garage
October 19, 2019	Amsterdam	Netherlands	Paradiso
October 31, 2019	Orlando	United States	Soundbar
November 1, 2019	Atlanta	United States	Hell at Masquerade
November 2, 2019	Washington, D.C.	United States	Rock & Roll Hotel
November 7, 2019	Toronto	Canada	Mod Club Theatre
November 8, 2019	Montreal	Canada	Bar Le Ritz
November 9, 2019	New York City	United States	Sony Hall
November 10, 2019	Boston	United States	Brighton Music Hall
November 14, 2019	Des Moines	United States	Vaudeville Mews
November 15, 2019	Minneapolis	United States	Studio B at Skyway Theatre
November 16, 2019	Milwaukee	United States	The Miramar Theatre
November 21, 2019	Cincinnati	United States	Top Cats
November 22, 2019	Kansas City	United States	recordBar
November 23, 2019	Tulsa	United States	The Vanguard
November 27, 2019	Denver	United States	Globe Hall
December 6, 2019	Phoenix	United States	The Rebel Lounge
December 7, 2019	Los Angeles	United States	El Rey Theatre
December 12, 2019	Houston	United States	White Oak Music Hall
December 13, 2019	Austin	United States	Barracuda
December 14, 2019	Dallas	United States	Dada
December 18, 2019	Honolulu	United States	Blue Note

List of 2020 concerts
Date	City	Country	Venue
January 10, 2020	Oakland	United States	The New Parish
January 11, 2020	Portland	United States	Stage 722
January 18, 2020	Salt Lake City	United States	The Complex
January 19, 2020	Detroit	United States	The Shelter
January 20, 2020	Philadelphia	United States	Foundry at Fillmore
January 23, 2020	Seattle	United States	The Crocodile
January 24, 2020	Bellingham	United States	Mount Baker Theatre
January 31, 2020	Chicago	United States	Bottom Lounge
