= Greyson Chance =

American singer-songwriter and musician (born 1997)

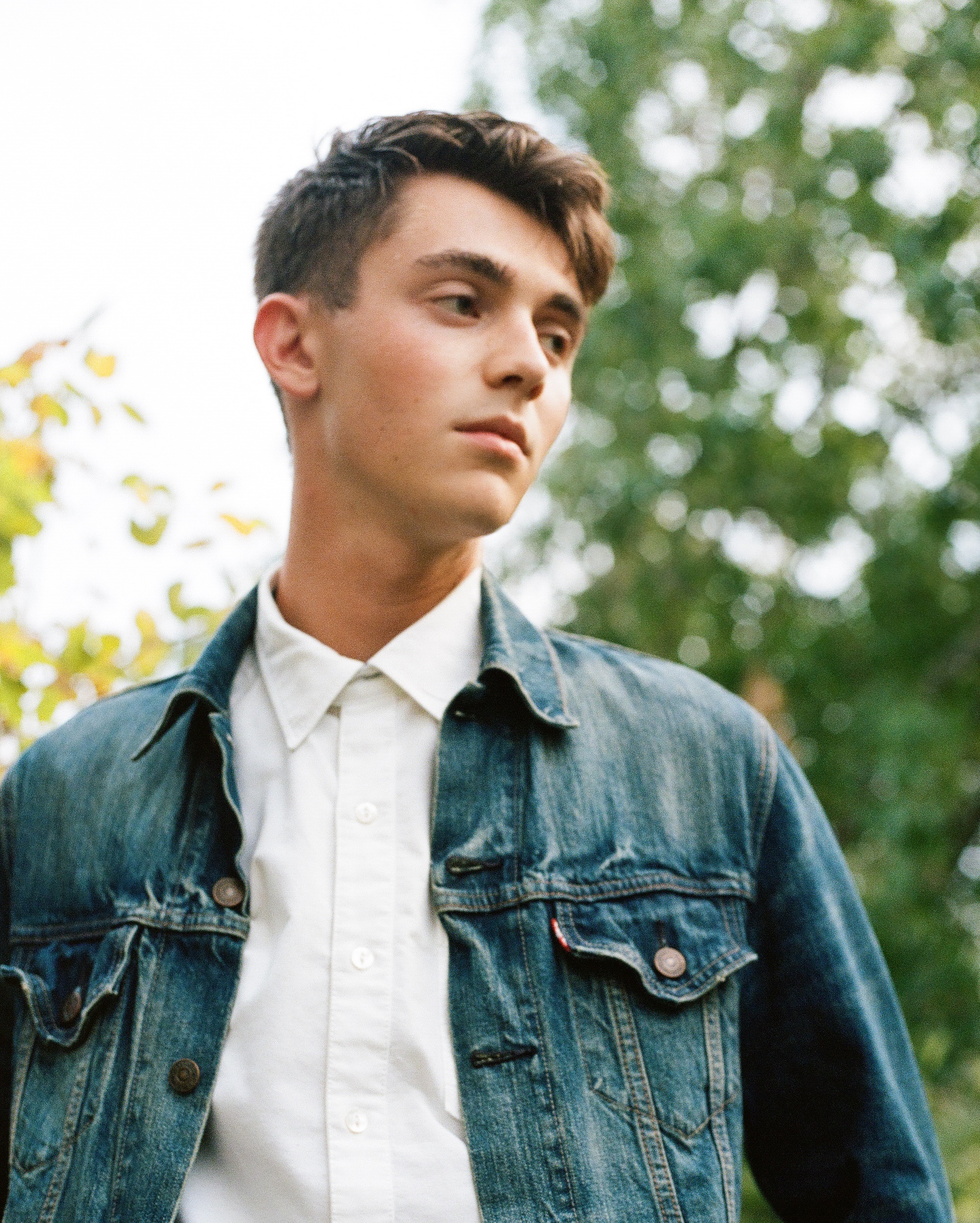
- Chance in 2017

Background information
- Born: Greyson Michael Chance; August 16, 1997 (age 29); Wichita Falls, Texas, US
- Origin: Edmond, Oklahoma, US
- Genres: Pop; pop rock; electronic; dance-pop
- Occupations: Singer-songwriter; musician
- Instruments: Vocals; piano
- Years active: 2010–present
- Labels: eleveneleven; Maverick; Geffen; AWAL; Arista; Sony Music
- Website: greysonchancemusic.com

YouTube information
- Channel: Greyson Chance
- Years active: 2010–present
- Genre: Music
- Subscribers: 893 thousand
- Views: 219 million
- Last updated: June 19, 2026

Greyson Michael Chance (born August 16, 1997) is an American singer-songwriter. He rose to national attention in 2010 as a child singer after his performance of Lady Gaga's "Paparazzi" went viral on YouTube and gained over 72 million views. Two of his original songs, "Stars" and "Broken Hearts", gained over six and eight million views, respectively, on his channel the following year. He signed a joint-venture recording contract with Ellen DeGeneres' eleveneleven – an imprint of Maverick, Streamline, and Geffen Records – to release his debut commercial single, "Waiting Outside the Lines", in October 2010. His debut studio album, Hold On 'til the Night (2011) was released the following year and peaked at number 29 on the Billboard 200, remaining his only charting release.

Chance released his second extended play, Somewhere Over My Head in May 2016. It was preceded by the lead single, "Afterlife", in October 2015, and by the singles "Hit & Run" and "Back on the Wall" in early 2016. Later, Chance independently released his second studio album, Portraits (2019), which explored synth-pop. This album was preceded by the singles "Shut Up" and "Timekeeper".

== Early life ==
Chance was born August 16, 1997, in Wichita Falls, Texas, and grew up as a Catholic in Edmond, Oklahoma. The youngest child of Scott and Lisa Chance, he has an older sister and an older brother, both of whom also make music. Chance began playing the piano at age eight and had several years of piano lessons before he first went viral.

== Career ==
=== 2010: Musical beginnings ===
Chance's cover of Lady Gaga's "Paparazzi" was posted to YouTube on April 28, 2010, and for almost two weeks, the video generated low views. At least two social websites, GossipBoy.ca and Reddit, posted video embeds on May 10, 2010. The next morning, it was embedded on ryanseacrest.com, which reported finding the video via BuzzFeed, a website that attempts to track and predict emerging viral internet memes. Later in the day, TVGuide, The Huffington Post, and Yahoo! Music's video blog, Video Ga Ga, also posted articles embedding the video; TVGuide mentioned that a Facebook fan page had already been started for Chance. That afternoon, Ryan Seacrest and Ellen DeGeneres linked the video on their Twitter accounts, as did celebrity Ashton Kutcher later that evening.

DeGeneres first saw the video after Chance's brother, Tanner Chance, wrote to her show suggesting she watch it. The video had about 10,000 views when DeGeneres first saw it. On the afternoon of May 11, Yahoo! Music reported: "As of this writing, the video has had more than 36,000 views so far, and he's even been invited to perform on The Ellen DeGeneres Show. On May 12, DeGeneres' announcement of Chance's booking on the show was broadcast at different times across the US and posted to her website. The Wall Street Journal and Los Angeles Times, among other mainstream media, posted articles embedding the video and announcing the forthcoming appearance. Chance taped an interview and performance of "Paparazzi" in Los Angeles. During the interview, Chance received a phone call from Gaga, who the boy says is his "true inspiration." That evening, ABC World News broadcast a report on Chance, introduced by Diane Sawyer, who said the story struck ABC News as "part Billy Elliot and part Glee." On May 13, Chance's appearance on The Ellen DeGeneres Show was broadcast, and mainstream media, including CBS and People, reported on the appearance. That morning, Ryan Seacrest posted another link on Twitter, this time to the video of Chance appearing on The Ellen DeGeneres Show.

On May 15, Chance created an official Myspace page and an official Twitter account. Chance made a second appearance on Ellen, airing May 26, 2010, on which he performed his original song "Broken Hearts", received a $10,000 award for winning Ellen's Wonderful Web of Wonderment contest, a brand new Yamaha piano, and was announced as DeGeneres's first signed artist to her recording label eleveneleven. While explaining her reasons for naming her record label, she listed as one reason the fact that she first saw Chance's "Paparazzi" cover on May 11, 2010. Also, she states that 11 is Chance's soccer jersey number. Guy Oseary, who manages Madonna's career, and Troy Carter, who manages Gaga's career, would be co-managers of Chance's career, but no partnership with a major recording label had been finalized.

Because of his quick rise, including fast creations of fan sites, and high quality of the videos, The Christian Science Monitor examined the story to see if it was genuine or a clever marketing campaign, ultimately stating the "video is legit." In May 2010, ITN News raised many of the same questions; highlighting aspects of Chance's "Paparazzi" video, media industry analyst Alan Stevens pointed out the growing inability within modern media culture to distinguish between videos which are produced by amateurs and videos which are produced by professionals but made to appear amateur in origin.

=== 2010–2014: Hold On 'til the Night and Truth Be Told, Part 1 ===
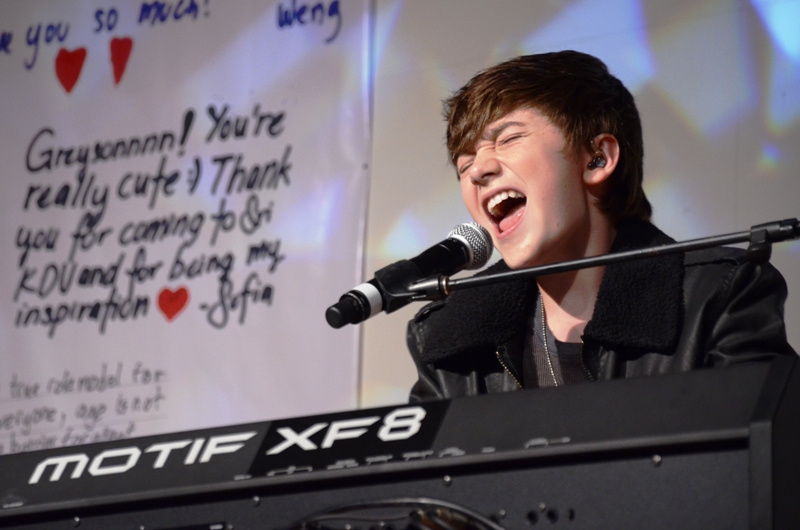
Chance performing in Malaysia in 2011

His debut single, "Waiting Outside the Lines", was released to iTunes on October 26, 2010. It was released digitally in the UK on December 9. The single also contained a remix featuring Filipino singer Jake Zyrus (then Charice), as well as studio versions of his covers of Lady Gaga's "Paparazzi" and "Fire" by Augustana. Throughout December, Chance appeared at We Day 2010 in downtown Toronto at the Air Canada Centre, where he performed "Fire", and visited both Paris and London, appearing on local radio stations and giving private concerts in both cities. On February 5, 2011, Chance entered the National spotlight again with a performance of "Waiting Outside the Lines" on CBS's Early Show, while stopping through New York on Miranda Cosgrove's Dancing Crazy Tour. He then started the Waiting 4U tour with Australian pop/R&B singer Cody Simpson on April 9 in Ivins, Utah. The tour ended on May 18, 2011, in Portland, Oregon.

On May 17, 2011, his second single, "Unfriend You", was released to iTunes and, on May 23, Chance visited The Ellen DeGeneres Show to premiere the single. After the performance, Chance revealed a solid release date for his debut album Hold On 'Til the Night, which was released on August 2, 2011. The music video features an appearance by Ariana Grande. On September 15, he again appeared on The Ellen DeGeneres Show to talk about his album, and also revealed that he had taken his first steps into acting, portraying a younger version of Jimmy Chance, the protagonist of Fox's comedy Raising Hope, in the series' second-season premiere. The episode aired on September 20, 2011.

In November 2011, Chance undertook a tour of Southeast Asia to promote his album, which had just been released in the region. The tour started in Kuala Lumpur, Malaysia, where in addition to a showcase performance he was invited to perform at the Malaysian Music Industry Awards show (the first foreign artist so invited since 1999) with Malaysia YouTube sensation, Najwa Latif, Chance also gave performances in Singapore; Kota Kinabalu (Borneo, Malaysia); Manila, Philippines; and Jakarta, Indonesia.

In March 2012, Chance returned to Asia to support the release of a special edition of the album, which was released to the Asian market on March 20. He was accompanied by his full four-part band and gave full concert performances in Kuala Lumpur, Singapore, Jakarta, and Manila, before going on without the band on a promotional tour to Taiwan, Hong Kong, and Bangkok, Thailand. In early July, he was back in the region for promotional and TV appearances in Hong Kong and Changsha (Hunan, China). In August, he performed at the MTV-CCTV Mandarin Music Awards show in Beijing and won the award for Most Popular New International Artist of the Year.

In November 2012, after releasing his EP Truth Be Told Part 1, he again returned to Asia for a promo tour starting in Kota Kinabalu (Borneo, Malaysia) to Kuala Lumpur, Malaysia, Singapore and Manila, Philippines.

=== 2014–2018: Somewhere Over My Head ===
On January 13, 2014, Chance released the song "Temptation" onto his SoundCloud. He performed the song at the Sundance Film Festival. Throughout the year, he continued the process of writing and recording his EP Somewhere Over My Head. On September 16, Chance released a single called "Thrilla in Manila". Another track named "Meridians" was released on March 24, 2015. Both songs, ultimately, did not appear on the final track list. The official lead single, "Afterlife", was released on October 29, 2015. In 2016, it was succeeded by "Hit & Run" on February 5 and "Back on the Wall" on April 29 as the second and third singles, respectively. On April 28, he released a music video for his single "Back on the Wall" on his YouTube channel. The EP was released May 13, 2016.

Before the release of Somewhere Over My Head, from January 27 to February 1, 2016, Chance performed three shows in Los Angeles, Chicago and New York City. He held a release party for his EP in YouTube Space LA on May 13, 2016, and on May 28 and 29, he had another two shows after the release of the EP in San Francisco and Seattle. During promotion of the EP, Chance was also featured on an electronic dance track by tyDi and Jack Novak titled "Oceans", which was released on February 19, 2016. In February 2016, he was picked as Elvis Duran's Artist of the Month and was featured on NBC's Today show hosted by Kathie Lee Gifford and Hoda Kotb and broadcast nationally where he performed live his single "Hit & Run". In June 2016, one month after releasing his EP Somewhere Over My Head, Chance returned to Asia for a short promo tour starting in Singapore, Kuala Lumpur and Penang in Malaysia, and Manila, Philippines.

On September 15, 2016, Frank Pole released a song titled "Anything" which featured Chance. On December 23, 2016, Chance released a song called "London". On May 6, 2017, Chance is also featured on Fabian Mazur's song called "Earn It". On May 12, 2017, Chance's cover of "Hungry Eyes" was released as part of the soundtrack album for the television film remake of Dirty Dancing. On June 30, 2017, Chance released a song called "Seasons". On December 8, 2017, Chance released his single "Low", and on May 4, 2018, he released his single "Lighthouse", collaborating with Danish-American DJ & music producer Fabian Mazur. Another single was released on June 8, 2018, called "Good As Gold".

=== 2019–2025: Portraits, Trophies, and Palladium ===
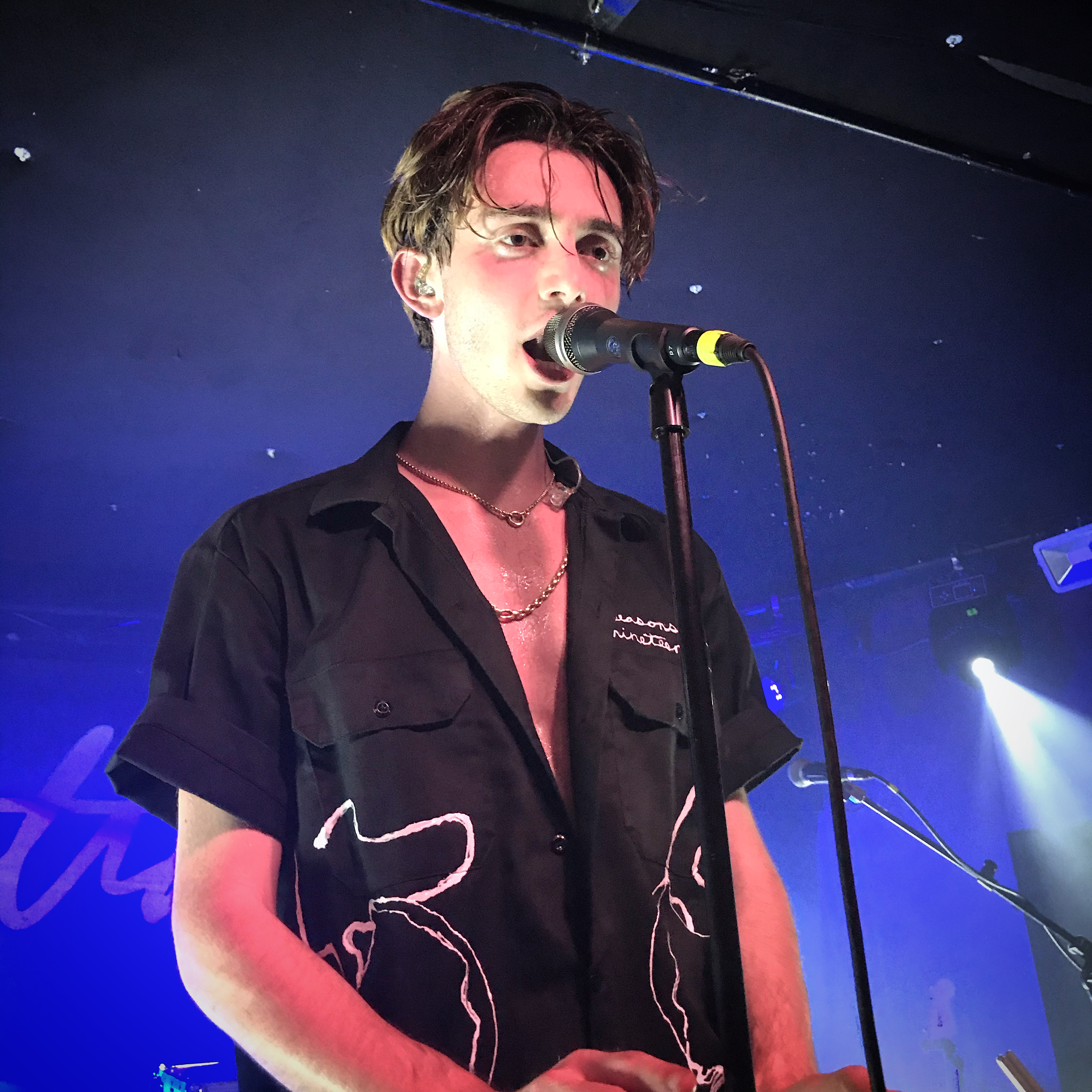
Chance performing in Berlin in October 2019

On March 15, 2019, Chance released his second studio album, Portraits. Due to his success independently, Chance signed his second major record deal with Sony Music Global and Arista Records, which will release any subsequent material he produces, in June 2019. In the same month he also announced a world tour promoting Portraits.

On January 15, 2021, Chance released "Holy Feeling", the lead single from his next studio album. The second single, "Hellboy", was released on April 23. Chance announced on April 29 that his third studio album, Trophies, would be released on June 25, 2021. That May, he announced he would be embarking on the Trophies World Tour, visiting various cities in North America and Europe over 2021 and 2022. In March 2022, it was announced that Chance would make his feature film debut, starring in Maybelline Prince.

Chance's fourth studio album, Palladium, was released on September 22, 2022. He then embarked on a North American tour which ended that December. On March 2, 2023, Chance announced on his Twitter account that a deluxe edition of Palladium would be released. It was released on April 21, 2023, and contained two additional songs, "Sex & Other Drugs" and "Herringbone". On June 2, 2025, in an Instagram post, Chance announced the Gold Tour, visiting cities in south east Asia – including Bangkok, Manila, Singapore and Jakarta – in October and November 2025.

=== 2026: Boystown ===
On June 17, 2026, Chance released "Jock Porn", a single from his studio album Boystown, which is scheduled for release in September 2026.

== Personal life ==
In 2017, Chance was attending the University of Tulsa and majoring in history, but he later dropped out to focus on music. On July 19, 2017, Chance came out as gay in an Instagram post. On August 14, 2020, Chance revealed he struggles with anorexia nervosa.

In 2022, in an interview with Rolling Stone, he accused DeGeneres of being manipulative and felt "completely abandoned" by her by the time his second album was released.

In early 2025, People reported that Chance had been hospitalized for a collapsed lung.

== Discography ==
=== Studio albums ===
Title	Album details	Peak chart positions
Title	Album details	US
Hold On 'til the Night	Released: August 2, 2011; Label: eleveneleven, Maverick, Geffen, Streamline; Formats: CD, digital download	29
Portraits	Released: March 15, 2019; Label: Greyson Chance Music, AWAL; Formats: CD, digital download	—
Trophies	Release: June 25, 2021; Label: Greyson Chance Music, Arista Records; Formats: LP, digital download	—
Palladium	Released: September 22, 2022; Label: Lowly; Formats: LP, digital download	—
Boystown	Released: September 25, 2026; Label: Greyson Chance Music; Formats: LP, digital download	—
"—" denotes items which were not released in that country or failed to chart.

=== Extended plays ===
Title	EP details
Waiting Outside the Lines	Release: April 19, 2011; Label: Geffen; Formats: Digital download
Truth Be Told, Part 1	Release: October 29, 2012 (Asia); Label: eleveneleven, Maverick, Geffen, Atom Factory; Formats: CD, digital download
Somewhere Over My Head	Release: May 13, 2016; Label: Greyson Chance Music; Formats: CD, digital download
Palladium Reimagined	Release: May 19, 2023; Label: Lowly; Formats: Digital download

=== Singles ===
==== As lead artist ====
Title	Year	Peak chart positions		Album
Title	Year	US Heat	BEL (FL)	Album
"Waiting Outside the Lines"	2010	12	95 (Note: "Waiting Outside the Lines" did not enter the Flanders Ultratop 50 but peaked at number forty-five on the Ultratip chart.)	Hold On 'til the Night
"Unfriend You"	2011	—	—	Hold On 'til the Night
"Hold On 'til the Night"	2011	—	—	Hold On 'til the Night
"Take a Look at Me Now"	2012	—	—	Hold On 'til the Night
"Sunshine & City Lights"	2012	—	—	Truth Be Told, Part 1
"Thrilla in Manila"	2014	—	—	Non-album singles
"Meridians"	2015	—	—	Non-album singles
"Afterlife"	2015	—	—	Somewhere Over My Head
"Hit & Run"	2016	—	—	Somewhere Over My Head
"Back on the Wall"	2016	—	—	Somewhere Over My Head
"London"	2016	—	—	Non-album singles
"Seasons"	2017	—	—	Non-album singles
"Low"	2017	—	—	Non-album singles
"Lighthouse" (with Fabian Mazur)	2018	—	—	Non-album singles
"Good as Gold"	2018	—	—	Non-album singles
"Twenty One"	2018	—	—	Non-album singles
"Shut Up"	2019	—	—	Portraits
"Yours"	2019	—	—	Portraits
"White Roses"	2019	—	—	Portraits
"Boots"	2019	—	—	Non-album singles
"Dancing Next to Me"	2020	—	—	Non-album singles
"Honeysuckle"	2020	—	—	Non-album singles
"Bad to Myself"	2020	—	—	Non-album singles
"Holy Feeling"	2021	—	—	Trophies
"Hellboy"	2021	—	—	Trophies
"Nobody"	2021	—	—	Trophies
"Overloved"	2021	—	—	Non-album single
"Palladium"	2022	—	—	Palladium
"Athena"	2022	—	—	Palladium
"Homerun Hitter"	2022	—	—	Palladium
"Herringbone"	2023	—	—	Palladium
"Rearview Mirror"	2024	—	—	Non-album singles
"Haymaker"	2024	—	—	Non-album singles
"Meet Me Outside"	2024	—	—	Non-album singles
"Summertrain '25"	2025	—	—	Portraits
"Waiting Outside the Lines '25"	2025	—	—	Portraits
"Flip the Record"	2025	—	—	Non-album singles
"Savana"	2025	—	—	Non-album singles
"Red Flags"	2026	—	—	Boystown
"Jock Porn"	2026	—	—	Boystown
"Sugar Rush"	2026	—	—	Boystown
"—" denotes items which were not released in that country or failed to chart.

==== As featured artist ====
Title	Year
"Oceans" (tyDi and Jack Novak featuring Greyson Chance)	2016
"Anything" (Frank Pole featuring Greyson Chance)	2016
"Earn It" (Fabian Mazur featuring Greyson Chance)	2017
"Walk Away" (Sick Individuals featuring Greyson Chance)	2017

=== Promotional singles ===
Title	Year	Album
"Timekeeper"	2019	Portraits

=== Music videos ===
Year	Song	Director
2010	"Waiting Outside the Lines"	Sanaa Hamri
2011	"Unfriend You"	Marc Klasfeld
2011	"Hold On 'til the Night"	Dano Cerny, Marielle Tepper
2012	"Sunshine & City Lights"	Clarence Fuller
2016	"Back on the Wall"	Rage
2018	"Good as Gold"	Bobby Hannaford
2019	"Shut Up"	Bobby Hannaford
2019	"Yours"	Bobby Hannaford
2019	"White Roses"	Bobby Hannaford
2019	"Boots"	Bobby Hannaford
2020	"Dancing Next to Me"	Edgar Daniel
2020	"Honeysuckle"	Rahul Chakraborty
2020	"Bad to Myself"	Rahul Chakraborty
2021	"Holy Feeling"	Bobby Hannaford
2021	"Hellboy"	The Lee Family
2021	"Nobody"	Greyson Chance
2022	"My Dying Spirit"	Damien Blue

== Tours ==
Headlining

- Hold On 'Til the Night Tour (2011–2012)
- Portraits World Tour (2019–2020)
- Trophies World Tour (2021–2022)
- Palladium World Tour (2022–2023)
- The Gold Tour (2025)

Co-headlining

- Waiting 4U Tour (2011)

Opening

- Dancing Crazy Tour (2011)

== Awards and recognition ==
Year	Category	Award	Result
2010	Choice Web Star	Teen Choice Awards	Nominated
2010	Icon of Tomorrow	J-14 Teen Icon Awards	Nominated
2010	Teen Pick: YouTube Artist	Hollywood Teen TV Awards	Won
2011	Favorite Viral Video Star	People's Choice Awards	Nominated
2011	Rockin' New Artist of the Year	Youth Rock Awards	Won
2012	Most Popular New International Artist of the Year	MTV-CCTV Mandarin Music Awards	Won
2013	Singer	Shorty Awards	Won
2013	Most Dedicated Fan Army	Heat Tweets Award	Won
2013	Greatest YouTube Star	Popdust Award	Nominated
