= Waiting Outside the Lines =

Single by Greyson Chance

from the album Hold On 'til the Night
- Released: October 26, 2010
- Recorded: 2010
- Genre: Pop rock
- Length: 3:52
- Label: eleveneleven; Maverick; Geffen
- Songwriters: Marcos Palacios; Ernest Clark; Aaron Cox; Eric Bellinger; Greyson Chance
- Producers: Da Internz; Ron Fair

Greyson Chance singles chronology
"Waiting Outside the Lines" (2010)	"Unfriend You" (2011)

Music video
- "Waiting Outside the Lines" on YouTube

"Waiting Outside the Lines" is the debut single of American pop rock singer Greyson Chance. The song was written by Aaron Michael Cox and produced by Da Internz and Ron Fair. It was released exclusively to iTunes on October 26, 2010. The CD single was later released on December 14, 2010 under eleveneleven, Maverick Records, and Geffen Records . It also contained a studio version of cover hits from Lady Gaga and Augustana. The official remix features vocals from Filipino pop and R&B singer Jake Zyrus. The song also appeared on the 2011 compilation album Now That's What I Call Music! 37

The song's accompanying music video was directed by Sanaa Hamri.

== Track listing ==
Digital download

1. "Waiting Outside the Lines" – 3:52

US & UK CD single

No.	Title	Writer(s)	Length
1.	"Waiting Outside the Lines"	Marcos Palacios; Ernest Clark; Aaron Cox; Eric Bellinger; Greyson Chance	3:52
2.	"Paparazzi (originally performed by Lady Gaga) "	Lady Gaga; Rob Fusari	3:22
3.	"Fire (originally performed by Augustana)"	Dan Layus	3:01

Digital Download
No.	Title	Writer(s)	Length
4.	"Waiting Outside the Lines (Remix - featuring Charice)"	Palacios; Clark; Cox; Bellinger; Chance	3:52

CD single - Scholastic Book Club Exclusive CD (comes with a "locker poster" and an exclusive bonus track)
No.	Title	Length
4.	"Light Up the Dark"	3:24

== Charts ==
Chart (2010)	Peak position
Belgium (Ultratip Bubbling Under Flanders)	45
US Heatseekers Songs	12

== Release history ==
Region	Date	Format
United States	October 26, 2010	Digital download
United Kingdom	December 9, 2010	Digital download
United States	December 14, 2010	CD single
United Kingdom	December 14, 2010	CD single
