= Infinity (Charice album) =

Studio album by Charice
- Released: October 5, 2011
- Recorded: 2010–2011
- Genres: Pop; R&B
- Length: 44:09
- Label: Warner Bros.
- Producers: Superfly; Oak; The Y's; Wayne Wilkins; Soulshock; Nick Jonas; Kara DioGuardi; Deekay; The Smeezingtons

Charice chronology
Grown-Up Christmas List (2010)	Infinity (2011)	Chapter 10 (2013)

Singles from Infinity
- 1. "Before It Explodes" Released: April 18, 2011; 2. "One Day" Released: April 19, 2011; 3. "Louder" / "Lost the Best Thing" Released: May 20, 2011; 4. "Far as the Sky" Released: August 3, 2011 (Japan); 5. "New World" Released: September 21, 2011

Infinity (stylized as ∞) is the second international studio album and fifth overall release by Filipino pop and R&B singer Jake Zyrus (formerly Charice). The album was released exclusively in Asia on October 5, 2011 by Warner Bros. Records. The album was credited under the name Charice, Zyrus' name prior to his gender transition.

Zyrus launched a seven-city tour across Asia in order to promote the album in Summer 2012. The tour began on March 2, 2012.

The album's release in America was planned, but eventually cancelled due to unsuccessful singles.

== Background ==
On August 16, 2011, Zyrus's record label, Warner Bros. Records, announced their plans to release his second studio album early in Japan on October 5, 2011. On August 30 it was announced that the album would be titled Infinity.

On March 28, 2012, Zyrus said that he had been working on the American release of the album and that its track listing would differ from the Asian version. No release date had been decided at the time.

On July 27, 2013, he revealed the main reason why the album was never released in America: "Some of the songs didn't pass their standards. They're more about upbeat, danceable songs over there," he said in a statement.

== Composition ==
"Before It Explodes" was released as the album's lead single on April 18, 2011. "Louder" was released as the album's second single. Bundled with another track titled "Lost the Best Thing", the song was released on May 20, 2011. "One Day" was released as promotional single as a part of Acuvue's "ACUVUE® 1•DAY Contest".

"Far as the Sky" was served as single in Japan on July 27, 2011 for the Japanese drama series, Bull Doctor. "New World" was then released as single in Japan and is featured in Square Enix's role-playing video game Final Fantasy XIII-2.

== Release and promotion ==
To promote the early exclusive release of the album in Japan, Zyrus held a free concert titled "Special 'One Day' Free Live" at Shinjuku Square Garden in Tokyo. Around 1,000 fans reportedly turned up to watch Zyrus perform five songs from the second album despite the bad weather and he also thanked them for coming. He also chose four dancers from the audience to accompany him on one of his stage performances.

== Track listing ==
No.	Title	Writer(s)	Producer(s)	Length
1.	"Louder"	Daniel James; Leah Haywood; Shelly Peiken	Dreamlab	3:01
2.	"Lost the Best Thing"	Carsten Schack; Sean Hurley; Cathy Dennis	Soulshock	3:37
3.	"Bounce Back"	Lars Halvor Jensen; Kasia Livingston; Johannes "Josh" Joergensen; Daniel "Obi" Klein	DEEKAY	3:39
4.	"Before It Explodes"	Bruno Mars; Ari Levine; Phillip Lawrence	The Smeezingtons	4:00
5.	"Heartbreak Survivor"	Rico Love; Wayne Wilkins; Joanna Levesque	Wayne Wilkins	4:04
6.	"New World"	Koichi Tabo (多保孝一 of Superfly)		6:11
7.	"Lesson for Life"	Jason Derulo; Kara DioGuardi; Alex Francis; Dinavon Bythwood; Jordan Kyle; Joseph Angel	The Ghostwriters ・ Jordan Kyle	2:58
8.	"Never Always"	Frankie Storm; Warren Felder	Oak	4:05
9.	"One Day"	Nick Jonas; Dan Muckala; Jason Ingram	Nick Jonas; Dan Muckala	3:13
10.	"Lighthouse"	Natasha Bedingfield; Mike Elizondo; Danielle Brisebois	The Y's	3:59
Total length:				38:43

Japanese release
No.	Title	Writer(s)	Producer(s)	Length
1.	"Louder"	Daniel James; Leah Haywood; Shelly Peiken	Dreamlab	3:01
2.	"New World"	Koichi Tabo (多保孝一 of Superfly)		6:11
3.	"Bounce Back"	Lars Halvor Jensen; Kasia Livingston; Johannes "Josh" Joergensen; Daniel "Obi" Klein	DEEKAY	3:39
4.	"Far as the Sky"	Yusuke Tanaka (田中ユウスケ)		5:26
5.	"Lost the Best Thing"	Carsten Schack; Sean Hurley; Cathy Dennis	Soulshock	3:37
6.	"Heartbreak Survivor"	Rico Love; Wayne Wilkins; Joanna Levesque	Wayne Wilkins	4:04
7.	"Before It Explodes"	Bruno Mars; Ari Levine; Phillip Lawrence	The Smeezingtons	4:00
8.	"Lesson for Life"	Jason Derulo; Kara DioGuardi; Alex Francis; Dinavon Bythwood; Jordan Kyle; Joseph Angel	The Ghostwriters ・ Jordan Kyle	2:58
9.	"Never Always"	Frankie Storm; Warren Felder	Oak	4:05
10.	"One Day"	Nick Jonas; Dan Muckala; Jason Ingram	Nick Jonas; Dan Muckala	3:13
11.	"Lighthouse"	Natasha Bedingfield; Mike Elizondo; Danielle Brisebois	The Y's	3:59
Total length:				44:09

== Charts and certification ==
Chart (2011)	Peak position
Japan Billboard Top Albums	8
