= One Day (Charice song) =

Single by Charice

from the album Infinity
- Released: April 19, 2011
- Recorded: 2011
- Genre: Pop; R&B
- Length: 3:13
- Label: 143; Reprise
- Songwriters: Nicholas Jerry Jonas; Dan Muckala; Jason Ingram
- Producers: Nick Jonas; Dan Muckala

Charice singles chronology
"Before It Explodes" (2011)	"One Day" (2011)	"Louder" (2011)

Music video
- "One Day" on YouTube

"One Day" is a song by Filipino pop and R&B recording artist Charice, now known as Jake Zyrus. The song was co-written and co-produced by American recording artist Nick Jonas. The song was released for digital download on April 19, 2011.

== Background ==
The following day after the release of "Before It Explodes", a follow-up announcement was made by Zyrus.

To promote the song's release, an online competition was launched by Acuvue Contact Lenses. The winners of the contest were given a chance to appear in the music video for the song. The song was used as a part of Acuvue's "ACUVUE 1•DAY Contest".

== Music video ==
The music video for the song was filmed in Los Angeles on June 17. It premiered on July 27, 2011, on AOL Music's website. In the video, instead of making fun of a teenage boy for drawing a sketch of another boy, his classmates compliment him on his artwork. In another room, two students stay focused and learn not to give up on their dance routine. The video ends with a student from every rung on the high school social ladder engaging in a dance party. Zyrus is seen watching as the events unfold, singing by the staircase and dancing with the students.

A Japanese version of the music video was released on October 19, 2011, and was uploaded on Warner Bros Japan's YouTube channel. In the video, while Zyrus is singing a montage of people pursuing their dreams can be seen behind him. In another scene, while he is walking around the streets he meets a few dancers who later on accompany him in the video. He is then seen at a party surrounded by a crowd of people whose pictures were posted on the montage that was seen earlier in the video. There are also intercut scenes that show them studying and trying to pursue their dreams.

== Track listing ==
- Digital download
1. "One Day" – 3:13

== Release history ==
Country	Date	Format	Label
United States	April 19, 2011	Digital download	Reprise Records
