= Somewhere Over My Head =

EP by Greyson Chance
- Released: May 13, 2016
- Genre: Pop; R&B
- Length: 20:03
- Label: Greyson Chance Music; Universal
- Producer: Jordan Palmer; Stuart Crichton; Willy Beaman; David Ryan Harris

Greyson Chance chronology
Truth Be Told, Part 1 (2012)	Somewhere Over My Head (2016)	Portraits (2019)

Singles from Somewhere Over My Head
- 1. "Afterlife" Released: October 29, 2015; 2. "Hit & Run" Released: February 5, 2016; 3. "Back on the Wall" Released: April 29, 2016

Somewhere Over My Head is the second extended play (EP) by American singer Greyson Chance. The EP was released on 13 May 2016 through his own independent label, Greyson Chance Music, and Universal Music.

== Singles ==
Chance released three singles from the EP. The first single, "Afterlife", was released on October 29, 2015. "Hit & Run" was released as the second single on February 5, 2016. The third and final single, "Back on the Wall", was released on April 29, 2016. On February 1, 2016, Chance performed songs from his EP live in The Studio at Webster Hall in New York City.

== Track listing ==
No.	Title	Writer(s)	Producer(s)	Length
1.	"Afterlife"	Adam Stidham; Greyson Chance	Jordan Palmer	3:18
2.	"Back on the Wall"	Claire Reynolds; Chance	Stuart Crichton	3:25
3.	"Hit & Run"	Chance	Willy Beaman	3:50
4.	"No Fear"	Chance	Beaman	3:43
5.	"More Than Me"	David Ryan Harris; Chance	Harris	5:47
Total length:				21:03

10th anniversary edition LP
No.	Title	Length
6.	"Thrilla in Manila"	3:35
7.	"Temptation" (remastered)
8.	"London" (remastered)

== Charts ==
Chart (2016)	Peak position
US Independent Albums (Billboard)	43

== Release history ==
Country	Release date	Format	Label
Various	May 13, 2016	Digital download	Greyson Chance Music
Indonesia	May 13, 2016	CD	Universal
Malaysia	May 13, 2016	CD	Universal
Taiwan	May 13, 2016	CD	Universal
United States	May 13, 2016	CD	Universal
