= Hold On 'til the Night =

Studio album by Greyson Chance
- Released: August 2, 2011
- Recorded: 2010–11
- Studio: Tinderbox and Sound Factory, Los Angeles, CA
- Genre: Pop rock
- Length: 36:07
- Label: eleveneleven; Maverick; Streamline; Geffen
- Producer: Da Internz; Josh Alexander; Billy Steinberg; The Matrix; Danielle Brisebois; Nick Lashley; Matt Squire; Martin Terefe; Fisticuffs; David Jost; Jochen Naaf

Greyson Chance chronology
Hold On 'til the Night (2011)	Truth Be Told, Part 1 (2012)

Singles from Hold On 'til the Night
- 1. "Waiting Outside the Lines" Released: October 26, 2010; 2. "Unfriend You" Released: May 17, 2011; 3. "Hold On 'til the Night" Released: November 6, 2011; 4. "Take a Look at Me Now" Released: February 5, 2012

Hold On 'til the Night is the debut studio album by American singer Greyson Chance. The album was released on August 2, 2011, by eleveneleven, Maverick Records, Streamline Records, and Geffen Records. Chance's album is the first to be released on Ellen DeGeneres' record label eleveneleven. The album's release was preceded by two singles, "Waiting Outside the Lines" and "Unfriend You". The album was recorded in Los Angeles and produced by The Matrix, Billy Steinberg and Ron Fair.

== Singles ==
"Waiting Outside the Lines" was released as the first single on October 26, 2010 and as an EP release on April 19, 2011. The music video, directed by Sanaa Hamri, was released December 13, 2010.

"Unfriend You" was released as the second single on May 17, 2011. The music video, which features Ariana Grande, was released on June 30, 2011.

"Hold On 'til the Night", the title track, is the third single from the album. A music video for the song was shot on November 6, 2011. The music video premiered on Friday, December 9 on VEVO.

"Take a Look at Me Now" was released in Asia on February 5, 2012, as the fourth single from the album.

== Critical reception ==
Professional ratings
Review scores
Source	Rating
Allmusic	2.5/5 stars
Entertainment Weekly	(B)
Rolling Stone	2/5 stars
Toronto Star	3.5/4 stars
Us Magazine	3/4 stars

Chance's debut album has received mixed to positive reviews. Us Magazine rewarded Chance with three stars and a positive review, claiming that he "outdoes himself with 10 originals". Entertainment Weekly gave Chance a positive review as well by complimenting his mature voice saying, "Chance reveals a surprisingly mature voice on 'Hold On 'Til the Night' ('Heart Like Stone' provides a welcome touch of outsider brooding), though the Facebook-spurred melodrama of 'Unfriend You' reminds listeners that he is, after all, just a kid." The overall grade for the album was a B. John Terauds of the Toronto Star gave it three-and-a-half stars, writing that "the boy's debut 10-track album is a solid effort that owes a massive debt to the boy bands of the 1990s" and ended with, "This YouTube phenom is standing on solid artistic ground here."

Rolling Stone gave the album a two star review, stating that "the 13-year-old is anything but threatening on this potential blockbuster of a debut", however the Rolling Stone community gave the album four and a half stars. NY Daily News also gave the album two stars explaining that "the singer's androgynous pitch — which lies well north of Justin Bieber's — limits his ability to make the CD's love songs credible for anyone over his own age".

Metacritic gave the album a 58 out of 100 based on 4 reviews, indicating "mixed to average reviews".

== Commercial performance ==
In the US, the album sold 16,185 copies in its first week, debuting at number 29 on the Billboard 200. In Canada, the album debuted at number 67 on the Canadian Albums Chart. The album re-entered the Billboard 200 chart on September 22, 2011, at number 144.

== Track listing ==
No.	Title	Writer(s)	Producer(s)	Length
1.	"Waiting Outside the Lines"	Marcos Palacios; Ernest Clark; Aaron Cox; Eric Bellinger; Greyson Chance	Da Internz	3:51
2.	"Unfriend You"	Josh Alexander; Billy Steinberg	Alexander; Steinberg	3:20
3.	"Home Is in Your Eyes"	Greyson Chance; Cox; Palacios; Clark	Da Internz	3:30
4.	"Hold On 'til the Night"	Lauren Christy; Graham Edwards; Scott Spoke; Greyson Chance	The Matrix	3:41
5.	"Heart Like Stone"	Greyson Chance; Danielle Brisebois; Nick Lashley	Lashley; Brisebois; Matt Squire	3:48
6.	"Little London Girl"	Martin Terefe; Sacha Skarbek; Andreas Olsson; James Walsh; Greyson Chance	Terefe	2:58
7.	"Cheyenne"	Kaci Brown; Dillon Rodriguez; Brian Warfield; Maclean Robinson	Fisticuffs	2:55
8.	"Summertrain"	David Jost; Alexander Zuckowski	Jost; Jochen Naaf	4:31
9.	"Stranded"	Priscilla Hamilton; Cox; Palacios; Clark	Da Internz	3:44
10.	"Take a Look at Me Now"	Christy; Edwards; Spoke; Greyson Chance	The Matrix	3:35

iTunes Store bonus track
No.	Title	Writer(s)	Producer(s)	Length
11.	"Slipping Away"	Alexander; Steinberg	Alexander; Steinberg	3:32
Total length:				36:44

Amazon MP3 bonus track
No.	Title	Writer(s)	Length
11.	"Purple Sky"	Greyson Chance; Danielle Brisebois	3:52
Total length:			37:04

Japanese bonus track
No.	Title	Writer(s)	Length
11.	"Light Up the Dark"	Greyson Chance; Danielle Brisebois; Matt Squire	3:27
Total length:			36:39

South East Asia bonus track
No.	Title	Writer(s)	Producer(s)	Length
11.	"Running Away"	James Bryan McCullom; Paul Herman; Greyson Chance	Martin Terefe	3:34
Total length:				36:46

Bonus QVC-exclusive DVD
No.	Title	Length
1.	"In-Studio Webisode"	1:42
2.	"Canada Webisode"	2:18
3.	"Paparazzi YouTube HQ Performance"	4:11
4.	"Waiting Outside the Lines - Behind the Scenes"	2:18
5.	"Waiting Outside the Lines"	4:08
6.	"LA Live Tree Lighting"	2:34
7.	"EPK"	3:47
8.	"Minnesota Mall of America"	3:02
9.	"Live at the House of Blues - Behind the Scenes"	2:02
10.	"Making the Album: Hold On 'til the Night"	4:07
Total length:		28:17

Special Asia edition additional tracks
No.	Title	Writer(s)	Producer(s)	Length
11.	"Running Away"	James Bryan McCullom; Paul Herman; Greyson Chance	Martin Terefe	3:34
12.	"Slipping Away"	Alexander; Steinberg	Alexander; Steinberg	3:32
13.	"Purple Sky"	Greyson Chance; Danielle Brisebois		3:52
14.	"Light Up the Dark"	Greyson Chance; Danielle Brisebois; Matt Squire		3:27
15.	"Paparazzi (Lady Gaga cover"	Lady Gaga; Rob Fusari		3:22
16.	"Fire (Augustana cover)"	Dan Layus		3:01
17.	"Waiting Outside the Lines (Remix) (featuring Charice)"	Chance; Palacios; Clark; Cox; Bellinger		3:52
Total length:				56:32

Special Asia Edition bonus DVD
No.	Title	Length
1.	"Waiting Outside the Line (Music video)"	4:02
2.	"Unfriend You (Music video)"	3:31
3.	"Hold On 'til the Night (Music video)"	3:46
4.	"Take a Look at Me Now (Special 'For Asia' video)"	3:42
5.	"Paparazzi (Video)"	4:09
6.	"Waiting Outside the Lines (Behind the scenes)"	2:24
7.	"Unfriend You (Behind the scenes)"	2:06
8.	"Hold On 'til the Night (Behind the scenes)"	2:34
9.	"EPK"	3:34
10.	"Track by Track"	4:04
Total length:		32:32

== Charts ==
Chart (2011)	Peak position
Canadian Albums Chart	67
US Billboard 200	29
