= Louder (Charice song) =

Single by Charice

from the album Infinity
- A-side: "Lost the Best Thing"
- Released: May 20, 2011
- Recorded: 2011
- Genre: Teen pop; dance-pop
- Length: 3:01
- Label: 143; Reprise
- Songwriters: Daniel Jamas; Leah Haywood; Shelly Peiken
- Producer: Dreamlab

Charice singles chronology
"One Day" (2011)	"Louder" (2011)	"Far as the Sky" (2011)

Music video
- "Louder" on YouTube

"Louder" is a song by Filipino pop and R&B singer Jake Zyrus, as the third single from his second international studio album Infinity released on May 20, 2011, ahead of its planned May 30 release, as a double A-side bundled with "Lost the Best Thing". It was credited under the name Charice, a name Zyrus used prior to his gender transition. This song was written by Daniel Jamas, Leah Haywood, Shelly Peiken and produced by Dreamlab.

== Critical reception ==
'Louder' gained positive reviews from contemporary music critics. According to Amanda Hensel of PopCrush, Zyrus "actually comes to terms with the soiled love affair pretty quickly, and vows to keep marching on because it’s the right thing to do" saying that she "also addressed ‘Louder’ to be destined for greatness as the feel-good anthem of the summer".

== Music video ==
After his 9/11 performances in Florida, Zyrus shot the music video for "Louder" on September 13, 2011. The music video was directed by Tim Cruz. Gil Duldulao, who choreographed the "One Day" music video, again lent his talent to the "Louder" music video. The music video premiered on EW.com on 18 October 2011. On November 18, 2011, the music video received the Best Music Video Award in the 2011 International Film Festival Manhattan (IFFM).

=== Story ===
In the video, Zyrus is shown singing by a window before it is swapped with an empty room where he continues singing. The room then goes back again to the first scene before shifting towards another room where he is seen being accompanied by two unknown dancers. As he sings the chorus, the scene changes to different location while on the line "feel that rhythm" the video vibrates as if imitating shock waves.

== Track listing ==
- Digital download
1. "Louder" – 3:01
2. "Lost the Best Thing" – 3:36

== Charts ==
Chart (2011)	Peak position
Japan (Japan Hot 100)	34

== Release history ==
Country	Date	Type
United States	May 20, 2011	Digital download
Canada	May 20, 2011	Digital download
Luxembourg	May 20, 2011	Digital download
Greece	May 20, 2011	Digital download
Canada	May 20, 2011	Digital download
United Kingdom	May 20, 2011	Digital download
Japan	September 28, 2011	Digital download
