= Charice (album) =

Studio album by Jake Zyrus
- Released: May 7, 2010
- Recorded: 2009–2010
- Length: 46:03
- Labels: Reprise; 143; Warner Bros.
- Producers: David Foster; Emanuel Kiriakou; Twin; Alke; Deekay; Josh Alexander; Billy Steinberg; Claude Kelly; Brian Kennedy; Klaus D; Oak; Papa Justifi; Scott Cutler; Anne Preven; Jochen van der Saag; Sebastian Thott; Steve Diamond; Chris Judge; Ty Knox

Jake Zyrus chronology
| My Inspiration (2009) | Charice (2010) | Grown-Up Christmas List (2010) |

Japan edition cover

Singles from Charice
- 1. "Note to God" Released: May 15, 2009; 2. "Pyramid" Released: March 2, 2010; 3. "Crescent Moon" Released: June 23, 2010 (Japan)

Charice is the debut international studio album and third overall release by Filipino pop singer Jake Zyrus, then known as Charice. It was released on May 7, 2010, under Reprise Records, making him the third Filipino singer to be signed on an international record label, the first being Lea Salonga (on Atlantic Records in 1993) and Regine Velasquez (on Mercury Records in 1994).

It was launched on The Oprah Winfrey Show during the World's Most Talented Kids episode with Iyaz on the same day. The album, immediately upon release in the United States, debuted at number eight on the Billboard 200, making Zyrus the first Asian artist to reach the top 10 on the chart solo.

The lead single, "Pyramid", featuring Iyaz, was released as the second and last single from the album on March 2, 2010. The single reached number 17 on the UK Singles Chart, making Zyrus the first Filipino singer to have a top 20 single in the UK. In Japan, the album was the 81st best selling album of 2010 according to Oricon, selling over 98,000 copies.

== Promotion ==
Upon the release of the album, Zyrus appeared on The Oprah Winfrey Show, where he performed, "Pyramid" and "In This Song". He also performed it on QVC with his other songs from his self-titled album, Zyrus, such as "I Love You", "Note to God" and "In This Song". He also sang "In This Song" on Live with Regis and Kelly.

== Singles ==
- "Note to God" was released as the album's first North American single on May 15, 2009.
- "Pyramid", featuring Iyaz was released as the album's lead international and second US single on March 2, 2010.
- "Crescent Moon" was released as third single in Japan.

== Critical reception ==
"Pyramid" (featuring Iyaz)
A 24-second sample of "Pyramid" with Zyrus singing the chorus.

Mikael Wood from the Los Angeles Times gave the album a mixed review, saying that it "darts somewhat haphazardly from sleek dance-pop tunes ... to schmaltzy slow jams" but also that "it also feels like an honest showcase of the singer's voice ... its strength lives up to that of [his] collaborators."

AllMusic's Andy Kellman gave it 3 out of 5 stars and wrote "As a showcase for a teenage powerhouse vocalist, Charice does succeed, but a more balanced mix of heart-heavy and upbeat material would have made the desired Whitney Houston and Mariah Carey comparisons more accurate".

Billboard gave the album a generally positive review, noting that "the set's stylistic shifts—from teen-oriented pop to a touch of rock ("In Love So Deep") to anthemic ballads—ultimately leaves you wondering just which audience [Zyrus] is eyeing: [his] teen peers or their moms," before concluding that "Though it doesn't hit on all cylinders, the album leaves no doubt as to [Zyrus's] talent—and promising future."

== Commercial performance ==
The album debuted at number eight on the Billboard 200 chart (issue of May 29, 2010), with sales of 43,000 copies in its first week of release in the United States. In Canada the album debuted at number four on the Billboard Canadian Albums.

== Track listing ==
Charice track listing
| No. | Title | Writer(s) | Producer(s) | Length |
|---|---|---|---|---|
| 1. | "Pyramid" (featuring Iyaz) | Lyrica Anderson; Niclas Molinder; Joacim Persson; Johan Alkenäs | Twin; Alke | 3:58 |
| 2. | "Reset" | Peter Habib; Adam Nierow; Johannes R. Joergensen | Deekay | 4:23 |
| 3. | "In This Song" | David Foster; Claude Kelly; Emanuel Kiriakou | Kiriakou; Foster | 3:36 |
| 4. | "Nobody's Singin' to Me" | Anne Preven; Scott Cutler | Brian Kennedy; Cutler; Preven | 3:38 |
| 5. | "Thank You" | Tom Leonard; Klaus Derendorf | Klaus D | 4:16 |
| 6. | "I Love You" | Kate Akhurst; Vince Pizzinga | Oak; Papa Justifi | 3:05 |
| 7. | "In Love So Deep" | Andrea Corr; Caroline Corr; Jim Corr; Sharon Corr; Billy Steinberg; Rick Nowels | Steinberg; Alexander | 4:08 |
| 8. | "All That I Need to Survive" | Carole Bayer Sager; Jorgen Elofsson | Jochen van der Saag | 4:05 |
| 9. | "Nothing" | Didrik Thott; Sebastian Thott; Steve Diamond | S. Thott; Diamond | 3:50 |
| 10. | "The Truth Is" | Alex James; Jud Friedman; Allan Rich; Carsten Lindberg | Chris Judge; Ty Knox (add. production) | 3:22 |
| 11. | "I Did It for You" | Molinder; Alkenäs; Persson; Ryan Tedder | Twin; Alke | 3:43 |
| 12. | "Note to God" | Diane Warren | Foster; Jochen van der Saag | 3:59 |
| Total length: | | | | 46:03 |

Japanese edition bonus track
| No. | Title | Writer(s) | Length |
|---|---|---|---|
| 13. | "Crescent Moon (三日月 "Mikazuki")" | Ayaka (lyrics/music); Yoshihiko Nishio (music) | 4:38 |

International edition bonus track
| No. | Title | Writer(s) | Producer(s) | Length |
|---|---|---|---|---|
| 13. | "I Did It for You" (with Drew Ryan Scott from Varsity Fanclub) | Molinder; Alkenäs; Persson; Tedder | Twin; Alke | 3:44 |

Japanese digital reissue bonus track
| No. | Title | Writer(s) | Length |
|---|---|---|---|
| 14. | "Crescent Moon (三日月 "Mikazuki")" | Ayaka (lyrics/music); Yoshihiko Nishio (music) | 4:38 |

Japanese Amazon.com limited edition bonus tracks
| No. | Title | Writer(s) | Length |
|---|---|---|---|
| 14. | "Pyramid" (Dave Audé Radio Edit) |
| 15. | "I Love You" (Dave Audé Radio Edit) | | 3:51 |
| 16. | "Crescent Moon (三日月 "Mikazuki")" | Ayaka (lyrics/music); Yoshihiko Nishio (music) | 4:38 |

iTunes Store and Target edition bonus tracks
| No. | Title | Writer(s) | Producer(s) | Length |
|---|---|---|---|---|
| 13. | "Breathe You Out" | Peter Habib; Adam Nierow | J Remy; Bobby Bass | 3:14 |
| 14. | "Are We Over" | Warren | Brent Paschke; Gabe Lopez | 3:55 |

QVC deluxe edition bonus tracks
| No. | Title | Writer(s) | Producer(s) | Length |
|---|---|---|---|---|
| 13. | "Fingerprint" | Jonas Jeberg; Robbie Nevil; Lauren Evans | Nevil; Jeberg | 3:25 |
| 14. | "Thank You" (piano/vocal) | Leonard; Derendorf | Klaus D | 4:16 |
| 15. | "Pyramid" (solo version) | Anderson; Molinder; Persson; Alkenäs | | 3:23 |
| 16. | "Pyramid" (dance mix) | Anderson; Molinder; Persson; Alkenäs | | 3:54 |

UK extended play release
| No. | Title | Length |
|---|---|---|
| 1. | "Pyramid" (featuring Iyaz) | 3:56 |
| 2. | "Reset" | 4:22 |
| 3. | "In This Song" | 3:36 |
| 4. | "Nobody's Singin' to Me" | 3:38 |
| 5. | "I Love You" | 3:05 |
| 6. | "Nothing" | 3:50 |
| 7. | "The Truth Is" | 3:22 |
| 8. | "Pyramid" (music video) | 4:06 |

Additional notes

- "Reset" contains Filipino lines in the bridge part of the song.

== Charts ==
Chart performance for Charice
| Chart (2010) | Peak position |
|---|---|
| Canadian Albums (Billboard) | 4 |
| Japanese Top Albums (Billboard) | 6 |
| South Korean Albums (Gaon) | 25 |
| US Billboard 200 | 8 |

== Release history ==
Release history and formats for Charice
| Country | Date | Label | Formats |
|---|---|---|---|
| New Zealand | May 7, 2010 | WEA International | CD, digital download |
| Australia | May 7, 2010 | WEA International | CD, digital download |
| United States | May 11, 2010 | 143; Reprise | CD, digital download |
| Canada | May 11, 2010 | WEA International | CD, digital download |
| Philippines | May 12, 2010 | WEA International | CD |
| South Korea | May 20, 2010 | WEA International | CD |
| Brazil | May 27, 2010 | WEA International | CD |
| South Africa | June 14, 2010 | Gallo Record Company | CD, digital download |
| Japan | July 7, 2010 | WEA International | CD, digital download |
| United Kingdom | September 27, 2010 | WEA International | Digital download |
