= Grown-Up Christmas List (EP) =

EP by Charice
- Released: November 30, 2010
- Recorded: 2010
- Genre: Christmas
- Length: 10:31
- Labels: 143; Reprise

Charice chronology
Charice (2010)	Grown-Up Christmas List (2010)	Infinity (2011)

Grown-Up Christmas List is the debut Christmas extended play (EP) and the fourth album by Filipino singer Jake Zyrus, released on November 30, 2010, and credited as Charice.

== Promotion ==
Jake Zyrus appeared in NBC's Christmas Tree Lighting at Rockefeller Center on November 30, 2010, where he performed "Grown-Up Christmas List" and "Jingle Bell Rock" accompanied by David Foster. He also appeared on Japan's Mezamashi TV, where he performed "Happy Xmas (War Is Over)". His promotions also took him to Japanese radios stations, where he performed "Happy Xmas (War Is Over)" live on J-Wave.

== Track listing ==
No.	Title	Writer(s)	Original artist	Length
1.	"Grown-Up Christmas List"	David Foster; Linda Thompson-Jenner	David Foster	3:39
2.	"Jingle Bell Rock"	Joe Beal; Jim Boothe	Bobby Helms	2:53
3.	"Happy Xmas (War Is Over)" (re-issue bonus track)	John Lennon; Yoko Ono	John Lennon and Yoko Ono/Plastic Ono Band with the Harlem Community Choir	3:59
Total length:				10:31

== Charts ==
The song "Happy Xmas (War Is Over)" debuted on the Billboard Japan Hot 100 at no. 83.
