= Note to God =

2009 single by Jake Zyrus

Song by JoJo

from the album The High Road
- Released: October 17, 2006
- Recorded: 2005–2006
- Genre: R&B; pop; gospel
- Length: 4:27
- Label: Da Family; Blackground
- Songwriter: Diane Warren
- Producers: David Foster; Peter Stengaard

"Note to God" is a song written by Diane Warren and first recorded by American R&B singer JoJo in 2006 for her album The High Road. "Note to God" is partly an emotional prayer. The lyrics are composed of things that would be written in a letter to God.

== Charice version ==
"Note to God"

Single by Charice

from the album Charice
- Released: May 15, 2009
- Recorded: 2009
- Genre: Pop; CCM
- Length: 3:59
- Label: 143
- Songwriter: Diane Warren
- Producer: David Foster

Charice singles chronology
"Always You" (2009)	"Note to God" (2009)	"Pyramid" (2010)

On May 18, 2009, Filipino pop singer Jake Zyrus performed it on The Oprah Winfrey Show. The song recording produced by David Foster, was performed prior to Zyrus's gender transition. It served as the first North American single for his album, Charice. It was only released as a digital download but it charted in the US and Canada due to high digital sales.

Multiple Grammy Award-winner Diane Warren confirmed on The Oprah Winfrey Show that she immediately knew the song "Note to God" was perfect for Zyrus the moment she heard the young singer's voice. She also expressed her enchantment with Zyrus's rendition of her song and how the singer surpassed the expectations she set for this composition.

This emotionally packed song, which brought the studio audience to their feet and Oprah Winfrey to tears on The Oprah Winfrey Show, was accompanied by an orchestra, David Foster and the Western Michigan University's vocal jazz ensemble, Gold Company when it debuted on the show.

=== Promotion ===
Zyrus launched his debut single "Note to God", also credited under his former name Charice, with a performance on The Oprah Winfrey Show on May 18, 2009. This number served as the final act of Oprah's "Search for the World's Smartest and Most Talented Kids"; a year-long series which showcased kids with outstanding skills and talents from across the globe.

On May 30, 2009, Zyrus sang the song on the popular Italian television show, Ti lascio una canzone.

On December 27, 2009, he appeared on the grand finale of Singapore Idol as a guest performer and sung two of his signature songs, a medley of songs from The Bodyguard and "Note to God".

=== Chart performance ===
On the issue date of June 6, 2009, "Note to God" entered the Billboard Hot 100 at number 44, making Zyrus the second Filipino singer to enter the chart since Jaya's debut single "If You Leave Me Now" peaked on the Billboard Hot 100 at number 44 in 1990. It also debuted at number 35 on the Canadian Hot 100 in the same week.

"Note to God" peaked on the Billboard Hot Digital Songs chart at number 24, and the Hot Canadian Digital Singles chart at number 9.

=== Charts ===
Chart (2009)	Peak position
Canada Hot 100 (Billboard)	35
US Billboard Hot 100	44
