= Pyramid (song) =

2010 single by Charice featuring Iyaz

Single by Charice featuring Iyaz

from the album Charice
- Released: February 23, 2010
- Genre: Pop; R&B
- Length: 3:56 (album and single version); 3:51 (radio edit); 3:22 (Charice solo version)
- Label: 143; Reprise
- Songwriters: Lyrica Anderson; David Jassy; Niclas Molinder; Joacim Persson; Johan Alkenäs
- Producers: Twin; Alke

Charice singles chronology
"Note to God" (2009)	"Pyramid" (2010)	"Before It Explodes" (2011)

Iyaz singles chronology
"Solo" (2010)	"Pyramid" (2010)	"So Big" (2010)

Alternative cover
- Pyramid Remix EP

Music video
- "Pyramid" on YouTube

"Pyramid" is a song by Filipino pop singer Jake Zyrus, credited under his pre-gender transition name Charice. The song features vocals from British Virgin Islands singer Iyaz, was written by David Jassy, Niclas Molinder, Joacim Persson, Johan Alkenäs and R&B singer-songwriter Lyrica Anderson, and produced by Twin and Alke. It served as the lead international single from Zyrus' debut album, Charice.

A remix of "Pyramid" was to be released on iTunes on February 16, 2010, but was later changed to February 23, the same day as the release of the album version. The album version was itself then delayed and released on March 2. "Pyramid" had already received airplay before it was released to iTunes. It aired on 104.3 in Las Vegas before its release as a single. The album version was released to US mainstream radio on March 15, 2010. It is his first single to achieve mainstream airplay.

"Pyramid" peaked at number 56 on the US Billboard Hot 100. It also reached number one on the Billboard Dance Club Songs chart. The song was sung in Simlish for The Sims 3: Ambitions, an expansion pack for the strategic life simulation computer game, The Sims 3.

== Music video ==
"Pyramid" (featuring Iyaz)
A 24-second sample of "Pyramid" featuring vocals from Zyrus and Iyaz during the chorus.

The promotional music video for the track was released on March 2, 2010. The video shows Zyrus and Iyaz in the studio singing and recording the vocals to the song.

The official music video for the track was directed by Scott Speer and released on April 12, 2010, premiering on Oprah Winfrey's website. The video was shot at the Orpheum Theatre, in downtown Los Angeles on March 8, 2010. The music video shows Zyrus upset at not being selected for further school auditions. Zyrus steps out on stage and Iyaz films his singing on his camera phone.

== Live performances ==
Zyrus's first live performance was on The Oprah Winfrey Show with Iyaz on May 11, 2010. He also performed it on QVC with his other songs from his self-titled album, Charice such as "I Love You", "Note to God" and "In This Song".

== Track listings ==
- Digital download
1. "Pyramid" (featuring Iyaz) (album version) – 4:07
- Remix EP – digital download
1. "Pyramid" (Barry Harris Club)
2. "Pyramid" (Barry Harris Radio Edit)
3. "Pyramid" (Jonathan Peters Club)
4. "Pyramid" (Jonathan Peters Radio Edit)
5. "Pyramid" (Dave Audé Club)
6. "Pyramid" (Dave Audé Radio Edit)
- iTunes Canada single version
1. "Pyramid" – 3:21
- Europe digital – EP
1. "Pyramid" (featuring Iyaz) – 3:56
2. "Pyramid" (Dave Audé Club) – 7:04
3. "Pyramid" (Dave Audé Radio Edit) – 3:59
4. "Pyramid" (Jonathan Peters Radio Edit) – 3:43

== Charts ==
=== Weekly charts ===
Chart (2010)	Peak position
Australia (ARIA)	45
Canada Hot 100 (Billboard)	41
Canada Hot AC (Billboard)	29
Ireland (IRMA)	21
Netherlands (Single Top 100)	53
Scottish Singles Sales (Official Charts)	20
South Korea (Gaon Chart)	8
UK Singles (Official Charts)	17
UK Hip Hop/R&B (Official Charts)	5
US Billboard Hot 100	56
US Dance Club Songs (Billboard)	1
US Digital Song Sales (Billboard)	32

=== Year-end charts ===
Chart (2010)	Position
Japan (Oricon)	59
Japan Adult Contemporary (Billboard Japan)	32
US Dance Club Songs (Billboard)	17

== Certifications ==
Region	Certification	Certified units/sales
Japan (RIAJ) Digital single	Gold	100,000^{*}
^{*} Sales figures based on certification alone.

== Release history ==
Country	Date	Format	Label
United States	February 23, 2010	Digital download	Reprise
Canada	February 23, 2010	Digital download	Reprise
Netherlands	February 23, 2010	Digital download	Reprise
Japan	February 23, 2010	Digital download	Reprise
Australia	February 23, 2010	Digital download	Reprise
United Kingdom	September 17, 2010	Rhythmic airplay	Reprise

== See also ==
- List of number-one dance singles of 2010 (U.S.)
