= Always You (Charice Pempengco song) =

Single by Charice

from the album My Inspiration
- Released: May 1, 2009
- Genre: Pop
- Length: 4:50 (album version)
- Label: Star
- Songwriter: Jonathan Manalo

Charice singles chronology
"It Can Only Get Better" (2008)	"Always You" (2009)	"Note to God" (2009)

Music video
- "Always You" on YouTube

"Always You" is a pop ballad and the second single by Filipino singer Charice Pempengco, now known as Jake Zyrus, included on his second studio album, My Inspiration. Receiving ample radio airplay, it debuted on the MYX Music Chart at #20. It was written by Filipino songwriter Jonathan Manalo. The song was released only in the Philippines and South Korea. The song was nominated twice (including the prestigious Song of the Year) in the 23rd edition of Awit Awards in 2010. Awit is the Philippine version of Grammy Awards organized by the Philippine Association of the Record Industry. It received the Best Inspirational or Religious Recording but lost the Song of the Year award to Gloc-9's "Upuan".

== Song information ==
The song is the first collaboration between Zyrus and Jonathan Manalo, a Metropop Song Festival and Awit Award-winning songwriter. The concept behind the composition of "Always You" is about being able to fight in a battle of life because of the strength given by someone's inspiration. The song was released on Mother's Day of May 2009 as a tribute to Zyrus's mother. A music video was released on the day of the release of the single at MYX.

== Music video ==
The music video features Zyrus alongside his mother Raquel. Photos of him and his mother can be seen in some clips of the video.

== Promotion ==
Zyrus first performed "Always You" at Wowowee on ABS-CBN Network during the release of My Inspiration. He also performed his single at ASAP '09 on July 5, 2009.

== Awards and nominations ==
=== 23rd Awit Awards ===
Year	Nominee / work	Award	Result
2010	"Always You"	Song of the Year (for Jonathan Manalo, songwriter)	Nominated
2010	"Always You"	Best Inspirational or Religious Recording (for Charice)	Won
