= Acuvue =

Disposable contact lens brand

Acuvue logo

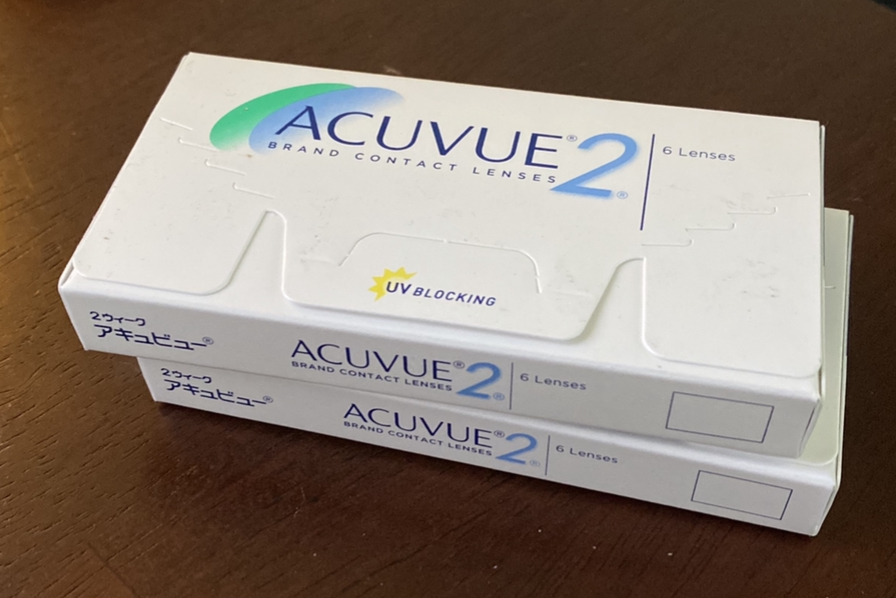
Acuvue 2

Acuvue (from "Accurate view") is a brand of disposable contact lenses made by Johnson & Johnson Vision (JJV), a subsidiary of Johnson & Johnson (J&J). Created in 1959 under the name of Frontier Contact Lens Company they renamed to Vistakon after being accquired by Johnson & Johnson, as a result and after a major overhaul of production Acuvue was introduced into the lenses market.

== History and profile ==
Acuvue lenses got their start at Frontier Contact Lens Company, founded in Buffalo, New York in 1959 by Dr. Allen Isen, George Sitterle, and Dr. William Feinbloom. Its early growth was attributed to its highly successful toric lens. In 1962, Seymour Marco joined the venture and Frontier moved its operations to Jacksonville, Florida. With 30 employees, Frontier manufactured a line of hard contact lenses through the 1970s.

During the 1970s, Frontier developed a new material (etafilcon A), and the company began making soft lenses. Frontier was among the first in the US to take this material, widely used in Europe, and combine it with a lathe cutting process to produce soft contact lenses.

In 1981, Johnson & Johnson acquired Frontier Contact Lenses and renamed the company Vistakon. The production process at the time of sale was very manual—every employee on the production line handled the lenses, whether they were lathing, polishing, or inspecting. Vistakon decided to invest in a new production process in order to scale.

Utilizing Stabilized Soft Molding (SSM) technology, Vistakon undertook a major overhaul in its production processes. As a result, Acuvue was introduced to the market in 1987. The lens was originally indicated for seven-day extended wear and later became a daily wear lens. Eventually the product line grew to range from the 1-day wear to two-week lenses such as the Acuvue 2 and Oasys and the Vita monthly lens.

All but one of Vistakon's manufacturing facilities are located in the United States. That exception is a plant located in Limerick, Ireland.

== Acuvue brands ==
Daily Disposable:

- 1-Day Acuvue Moist – (etafilcon A) hydrogel material (also available for astigmatism and presbyopia). Introduced in 2006.
- 1-Day Acuvue Define – (etafilcon A) hydrogel material, cosmetic contacts (UK release solely in Boots and D&A opticians in 2010)
- Acuvue Oasys 1-Day – (senofilcon A) silicone hydrogel material (available for astigmatism)
- Acuvue Oasys MAX 1-Day – (senofilcon A) silicone hydrogel material (available for presbyopia and astigmatism). Introduced in 2022.
- 1-Day Acuvue Define - (Etafilcon A) Silicone Hydrogel material colored contact lenses collection, popular in Asia. Introduced in 2015.

Two Week Disposable:

- Acuvue 2 – (etafilcon A) hydrogel material. Introduced in 1999.
- Acuvue Oasys – (senofilcon A) silicone hydrogel material (available for presbyopia and astigmatism). Introduced in 2005.

Monthly Disposable:

- Acuvue Vita – (senofilcon C) silicone hydrogel material (available for astigmatism). Introduced in 2016.

Surevue was also produced by Vistakon but not under the Acuvue brand. Surevue contact lenses were a less expensive alternative to Acuvue.

== Discontinued brands ==
- Acuvue – (etafilcon A) Original 1–2 week lenses, introduced in 1987. Discontinued 3/31/2015.
- 1-Day Acuvue – (etafilcon A) Original daily lenses, introduced in 1995. Discontinued 12/31/2017.
- Acuvue Advance – (galyfilcon A) Introduced in 2003. Discontinued 3/31/2015.
- 1-Day Acuvue TruEye – (narafilcon A) first silicone hydrogel daily disposable released 2008 in European markets and 2010 in North America.
- Acuvue Oasys with Transitions - (senofilcon A). Discontinued 6/30/2024.
