= Eleveneleven =

Record label company

eleveneleven
- Company type: Private
- Industry: Music
- Founded: May 2010; 16 years ago
- Founder: Mike Hamlin; Ellen DeGeneres
- Defunct: 2012; 14 years ago
- Fate: Defunct
- Headquarters: United States
- Key people: Ellen DeGeneres
- Products: Music
- Owners: A Very Good Production; Warner Bros.
- Parent: Ellen Digital Ventures

eleveneleven was a record label founded in 2010 by Mike Hamlin, Ellen DeGeneres and her production company, A Very Good Production, in association with longtime affiliate Warner Bros. DeGeneres announced it on her talk show, saying that the label would concentrate on lesser known artists and that she had been looking for videos of performances on YouTube. DeGeneres explained her choice of name, claiming that she often sees the number 11:11 when looking at her clocks, that she found Greyson Chance on the 11th, and that the singer's soccer jersey has the number 11. All of the artists on the label have been distributed via Interscope Geffen A&M.

== Artists ==
- The first act to be signed to the label was Greyson Chance, who gained fame after his cover of Lady Gaga's "Paparazzi" performed at a school in Edmond, Oklahoma went viral. He released his debut album Hold On 'til the Night on August 2, 2011. In 2022, Chance recalled being "completely abandoned" by DeGeneres and the label after he signed in 2010. He stated that DeGeneres came off as "controlling" until he started to underperform and then she grew distant, eventually dropping him.
- On September 16, 2010, DeGeneres announced her label's second signed artist, Tom Andrews, from the United Kingdom.
- In the fall of 2010, the label signed Jessica Simpson. She released her first album under the label called Happy Christmas on November 22, 2010.
- In March 2011, DeGeneres announced that she had signed Savannah Robinson to her label and had her on the show to perform a duet with Jennifer Hudson.
- In October 2011, DeGeneres announced that she had signed Charlie Puth and Emily Luther to her label after seeing their cover of Adele's "Someone Like You". Puth & Luther performed the song on the show. On January 25, 2012, they came back to The Ellen DeGeneres Show and performed Lady Antebellum's "Need You Now" and an original written by Puth titled "Break Again" (co-written with Robert Gillies). In 2022, Puth acknowledged that he and Greyson Chance had markedly different experiences at their label. While Puth said he never encountered the kind of rudeness others had reported, he agreed with Chance’s criticism that the label lacked meaningful support—particularly after the release of his first demo EP. He clarified that he was not placing blame on any one individual, but rather on the collective group. Puth signed to Atlantic in 2015.

The eleveneleven section on her official website shortlisted the four most popular acts from the web and asked for a democratic voting from her community to help her make an informed choice on the next artist to be signed to the label.
