= Jake Zyrus =

Filipino singer (born 1992)

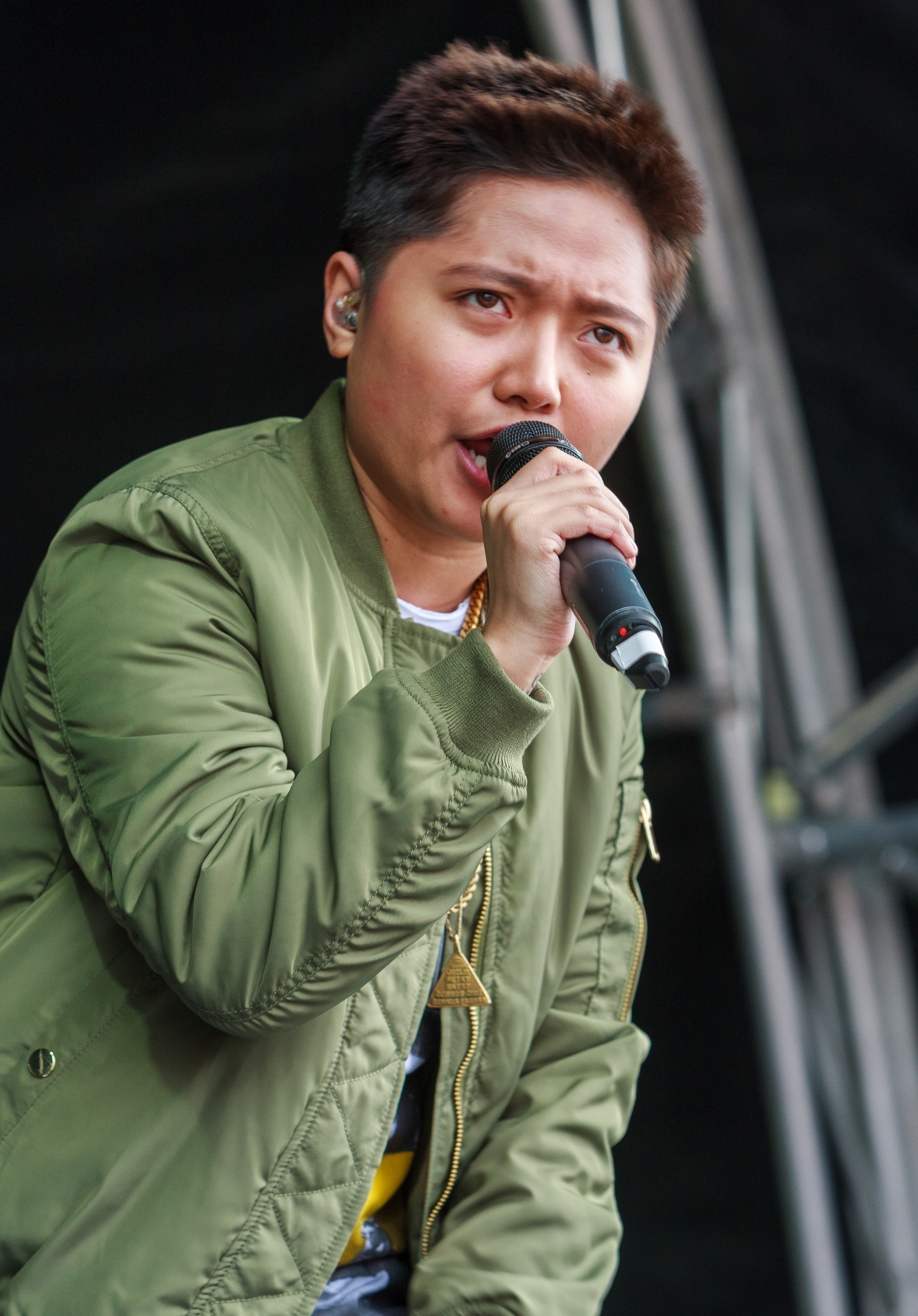
- Zyrus performing at the Barrio Fiesta in London, June 2016

Background information
- Also known as: Charice Pempengco; Charice (both; 2005–2017)
- Born: May 10, 1992 (age 34); Cabuyao, Laguna, Philippines
- Genres: P-pop; Pop; R&B; dance
- Occupations: Singer; television personality; actor
- Years active: 2005–present
- Labels: Star; Warner Bros.; 143; Reprise

Jake Zyrus (Tagalog: [ˈsaɪɾus]; born May 10, 1992), formerly known professionally as Charice Pempengco (Tagalog: [t͡ʃɐˌɾis pɛmˈpɛːŋ.ko]) and under the mononym Charice, is a Filipino singer and television personality.

In 2007, after competing in many singing competitions and several appearances on Filipino television, Zyrus performed on The Ellen DeGeneres Show in the United States. The following year, in 2008, he made several international televised appearances, including a special on The Oprah Winfrey Show, which documented his musical ambitions, home life and family, and featured Zyrus singing for Oprah's studio audience. On that appearance, Zyrus was surprised by one of his singing inspirations, Céline Dion (appearing from her tour via Skype), who invited him to sing with her at New York City's Madison Square Garden, during her 2008 world tour. At the concert, the two sang "Because You Loved Me", dedicating the moment to Zyrus' mother. The performance was eventually replayed on another special episode of Oprah's talk show.

Zyrus then began performing in concerts with David Foster and Andrea Bocelli, among others, and released an album My Inspiration (2009). Zyrus released the studio album Charice in 2010, which entered the Billboard 200 at number eight, making it the first album of an Asian solo singer ever to land in the top 10. The single "Pyramid" from that album, featuring singer Iyaz, is Zyrus' most successful single to date, charting within the top 40 in a number of countries after its debut live performance on The Oprah Winfrey Show.

Crossing over to acting and television, Zyrus joined the cast of the musical-comedy-drama TV series Glee, later in 2010, as Sunshine Corazon. In 2011, "Before It Explodes", written by Bruno Mars, was released as the lead single from Zyrus' second international studio album, Infinity. Zyrus would release two further albums, Chapter 10 (2013) and Catharsis (2016). Zyrus also made his own concert tours in Asia. Zyrus was one of the four judges of the Philippine version of The X Factor, on ABS-CBN, in 2012.

Zyrus identified as a lesbian from 2013 to 2017. When he came out as a transgender male after having male chest reconstruction and beginning testosterone treatment, he adopted the name Jake Zyrus and discontinued the use of the name Charice.

== Early life ==
Zyrus was born as Charmaine Clarice Relucio Pempengco in Cabuyao, Laguna province, the Philippines, and was raised by single mother Racquel. To help support the family, Zyrus began to enter singing contests at the age of seven, from town fiestas in various provinces to singing competitions on TV, eventually competing in almost a hundred such contests.

In 2005, Zyrus joined Little Big Star, a talent show in the Philippines loosely patterned after American Idol. Eliminated after the first performance, Zyrus was called back as a wildcard contender and eventually became one of the finalists. Although a consistent top scorer in the final rounds, Zyrus finished the show in third place. After Little Big Star, Zyrus made several appearances on local television shows and commercials, but did not receive wider notice until 2007 when an avid supporter, FalseVoice, started posting a series of Zyrus' performances on YouTube. These videos received over 15 million views, making Zyrus an internet sensation.

== Career ==
=== 2007–2008: Discovery and early work ===
In June 2007, producers at Ten Songs/Productions, a music publishing company in Sweden, invited Zyrus to record demos after seeing the online videos. Zyrus recorded seven songs, six covers and an original song called "Amazing", and was next invited to the South Korean talent show Star King on October 13, 2007, singing "And I Am Telling You I'm Not Going" and a duet of "A Whole New World" with Kyuhyun from Super Junior.

Having also seen the online videos, Ellen DeGeneres invited Zyrus to appear on her show, his first appearance in the United States, where he performed two songs on the December 19, 2007, episode: "I Will Always Love You" and "And I Am Telling You". Zyrus then made a second appearance on Star King in Korea on December 28 as the "Most Requested Foreign Act", performing Gloria Gaynor's "I Will Survive" and singing a duet with Lena Park. In January 2008, Zyrus was invited to Malacañang Palace to perform for President Gloria Macapagal Arroyo.

Zyrus next guested on the April 8, 2008, episode of The Paul O'Grady Show in London, England. The Philippine debut EP Charice was released in May 2008; this mini album, consisting of six songs and six backing tracks, was awarded gold certification in the Philippines in October and reached platinum status in 2009. Zyrus appeared on the May 12, 2008, episode of The Oprah Winfrey Show, "World's Smartest Kids", performing Whitney Houston's "I Have Nothing". After the show, Oprah Winfrey contacted David Foster to see what the music producer could do for Pempengco.

Zyrus performed with Foster for the first time as one of the entertainers on the May 17, 2008, opening of the MGM Grand at Foxwoods Resort Casino in Ledyard, Connecticut. This was followed by Foster's May 23 tribute concert, Hitman: David Foster and Friends, at the Mandalay Bay Resort and Casino in Las Vegas, Nevada, performing a medley of songs from The Bodyguard as well as "And I Am Telling You". A CD/DVD of this concert, including Zyrus' The Bodyguard medley, was released on November 11, 2008. The show was aired several times on PBS and other public television networks starting in December 2008 under the Great Performances banner. One of the singers at the concert was Pempengco's idol, Andrea Bocelli. Bocelli subsequently expressed interest in performing a duet with Zyrus with an invitation to be a guest on his birthday concert "The Cinema Tribute" held on July 20 at the Teatro del Silenzio in Lajatico, Tuscany, Italy. Aside from a solo performance, Zyrus sang a duet of "The Prayer" with the tenor in front of more than 8,000 people.

In a guest appearance on the "Dreams Come True" episode of The Oprah Winfrey Show on September 9, 2008, Oprah referred to Zyrus as "The Most Talented Girl in the World". After singing Celine Dion's "My Heart Will Go On" with David Foster on piano, Zyrus was surprised by Celine Dion's appearance via satellite, inviting Pempengco to sing a duet with her at New York City's Madison Square Garden as part of Dion's Taking Chances Tour. The duet, on September 15, of "Because You Loved Me", received rave reviews in news outlets including The New York Times, and was eventually featured on September 19 episode of The Oprah Winfrey Show. Zyrus sang at the Feyenoord's Centennial Anniversary in the Netherlands held on September 26, singing the team's anthem, "You'll Never Walk Alone" in front of a crowd of about 50,000 football (soccer) fans Zyrus then performed at the Andre Agassi Grand Slam for Children Benefit Concert at the Wynn Las Vegas casino resort in October. In November, Zyrus and David Foster appeared on Good Morning America to promote Foster's tribute album, Hitman: David Foster and Friends, performing The Bodyguard medley and "I Will Survive".

=== 2009–2010: First major performances ===
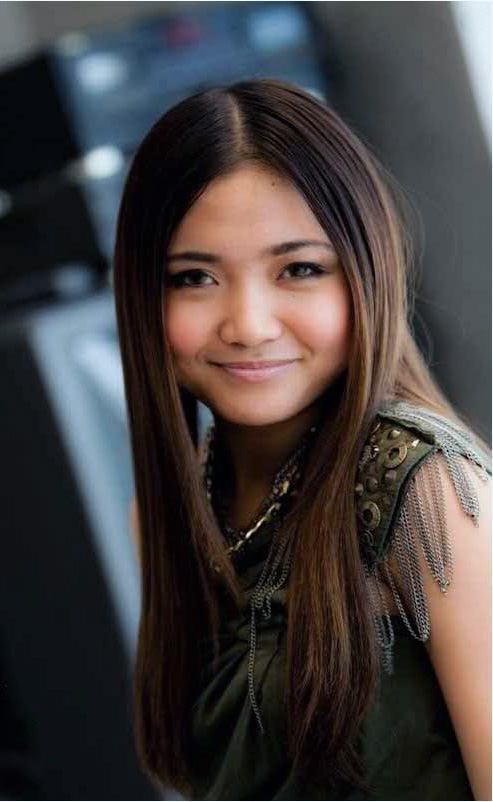
Zyrus in 2010

In January 2009, Zyrus performed at two pre-inauguration events in Washington, D.C., in the lead up to the first inauguration of Barack Obama: the "Realizing the Dream" gala at the Hyatt Regency Hotel and the "Pearl Presidential Inaugural Gala" at the Mandarin Hotel. February performances at two post-Oscar award events followed: Oscar Night at Mr. Chow's and Oprah's Oscar After Party, held in the Kodak Theatre. Zyrus then debuted a new original song, "Fingerprint", composed by Robbie Nevil and produced by David Foster, and then appeared in April in the season premiere of Ti lascio una canzone, an Italian musical variety show televised from Teatro Ariston in the city of Sanremo. Zyrus performed "I Will Always Love You", "I Have Nothing", "The Prayer", and "Listen", and went on to sing "The Star-Spangled Banner" in front of 57,000 baseball fans during the Los Angeles Dodgers 52nd season home opener at Dodger Stadium.

In April, Zyrus released a second Philippine album, My Inspiration. The album consists of 12 tracks, including "Always You" and a cover of Helen Reddy's "You and Me Against the World" performed as a duet with Pempengco's mother. The album was certified gold in the Philippines within two months after release, and then platinum in December 2009. Also in May, Zyrus would again perform at a David Foster and Friends concert held at the Mandalay Bay Resort and Casino in Las Vegas, Nevada. On May 18 episode "Finale: Oprah's Search for the World's Most Talented Kids" of The Oprah Winfrey Show, Zyrus debuted a first internationally released single, "Note to God", written by Diane Warren and produced by David Foster. The single was made available for digital download on the same day and debuted at #24 on the Billboard Hot Digital Songs chart, #44 on the Billboard Hot 100, #9 on the Hot Canadian Digital Singles chart and #35 on the Canadian Hot 100. Later that same month, Zyrus was again invited to sing at the Ti lascio una canzone show as a special guest.

The first major concert for Zyrus was called Charice: The Journey Begins, presented to a sold-out crowd on June 27 at the SMX Convention Center, SM Mall of Asia in the Philippines. Guests included Christian Bautista, Kuh Ledesma and Little Big Star finalists. On June 28, 2009, in concert, Zyrus revealed a planned duet with legendary pop singer Michael Jackson, explaining that Jackson's lawyer said that Michael had chosen Zyrus to be his special guest on his tour, but Jackson died before the tour could begin. Zyrus contributed to two Christmas albums in 2009, first as David Archuleta's duet partner for the song "Have Yourself a Merry Little Christmas" on his Christmas album, Christmas from the Heart, then contributing a rendition of "The Christmas Song" to the compilation album, A Very Special Christmas 7. Zyrus was one of the headlining acts on the David Foster and Friends 10-city North American Tour that ran during the fall of 2009, and made a cameo appearance in the feature film Alvin and the Chipmunks: The Squeakquel, released in North America on December 23. The official movie soundtrack includes Zyrus' rendition of "No One" by Alicia Keys, accompanied by The Chipettes. Later in the month, Zyrus appeared on the grand finale of Singapore Idol as a guest, performing two signature songs, The Bodyguard medley and "Note to God".

=== 2010–2012: Charice and Infinity ===
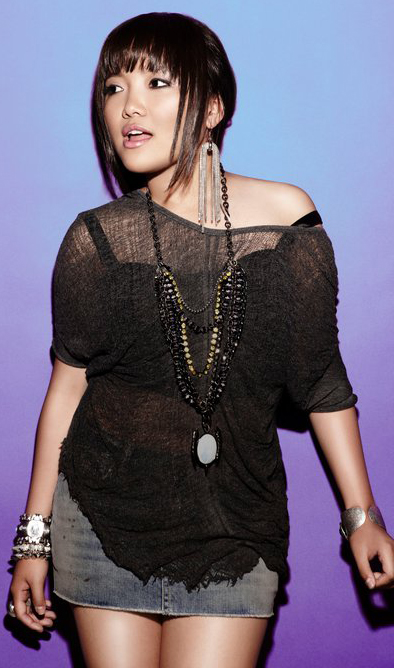
Zyrus in 2011

On January 23, 2010, Zyrus appeared on Io Canto, a renowned singing competition in Italy, performing international standards and an Italian favorite called "Adagio" (made popular by Lara Fabian), in Italian. On January 31 Zyrus was featured as one of the musical acts on the NBC Sports program Silk Soy Milk Skate for the Heart, raising awareness of heart disease. Zyrus performed "Note to God" and debuted two new songs included in the debut album, "In This Song" and "Breathe Out" (later retitled as "Breathe You Out"). The album version and club remixes of a second single from the international debut album, "Pyramid" (featuring Iyaz), were released on February 23, 2010, and March 2, 2010, while Reprise Records dropped the album itself on May 11, 2010. On the same day the launch, he made another guest appearance on The Oprah Winfrey Show along with Justin Bieber. Pempengco's worldwide promotion of the album was the subject of a 12-part mini-documentary 30 Days with Charice, filmed by Alloy TV and published at Teen.com. On June 22, Pempengco confirmed joining the cast of the hit US television series Glee for its second season. Later the same week, Charice released a promotional single called "Crescent Moon" in Japan, an English rendition of the Japanese song "Mikazuki" by Ayaka.

During the inauguration of Philippine President Benigno Aquino III on June 30, 2010, Zyrus sang the Philippine national anthem in front of a crowd estimated at more than half a million. July's promotional tour for the album took Zyrus to Thailand, the Philippines, Japan and South Korea, including a third appearance on Star King. On September 7 the premiere of Glee's second season was held in Hollywood with Zyrus in attendance. Zyrus' character Sunshine Corazon, an exchange student from the Philippines, presents lead character Rachel Berry (played by Lea Michele) with serious competition. On November 30, Zyrus appeared on NBC's Christmas in Rockefeller Center, performing two songs from the Christmas EP, "Grown-Up Christmas List" and "Jingle Bell Rock", with producer and mentor David Foster. Zyrus also performed "The Prayer" with the Canadian Tenors and David Foster on the piano for a Christmas special on CBC Television. In December of that year, Zyrus became Operation Smile's official Smile Ambassador, joining such celebrities as Jessica Simpson, Billy Bush, and Zachary Levi in the organization's global efforts to provide free surgeries to children born with cleft lip, cleft palate and other facial deformities. On January 8, 2011, Zyrus was launched as the new endorser of Aficionado Germany Perfume; this event, at the SM Mall of Asia Concert Grounds, titled 1@11, gathered an audience of 85,000. On February 13, 2011, Jake's music special Charice: Home for Valentine's was broadcast on the GMA 7 television network in the Philippines. From February 21 to 25, Zyrus embarked on a solo tour to Japan, performing in four shows held at three Zepp music halls, in Nagoya, Tokyo dates and Osaka.

It was announced that Zyrus had begun to record new material for an upcoming second international album. The comeback single, "Before It Explodes", written by Bruno Mars, was released on April 18, 2011. The day after its release, another single, "One Day" was released on iTunes, co-written and co-produced with Nick Jonas. "Louder", the third single, was released on May 20 bundled with another song, "Lost The Best Thing". On September 14, 2011, it was revealed in a Japanese broadcast that Zyrus would be singing the theme song to the video game Final Fantasy XIII-2, "New World". The second studio album, Infinity, was released exclusively in Japan on October 5, 2011.

On January 18, 2012, Zyrus launched a ten-city tour across Asia to promote the official release of the studio album, Infinity, due later in 2012; the tour began in March.

=== 2013–2015: Chapter 10 and Power of Two ===
On June 8, 2013, Zyrus revealed plans to release his third album in the Philippines entitled Chapter 10, containing covers of a favorite modern songs, before heading back to Los Angeles to record a new international album. The album was released on September 6, 2013, through Star Records; the lead single was a cover of "Titanium". On August 10, 2013 GMA Network's drama anthology series Magpakailanman aired an episode titled "The Charice Pempengco Story", in which Zyrus reenacted scenes based on his life. A joint concert with Aiza Seguerra followed on September 28 at the Smart-Araneta Coliseum, dubbed the "Power of Two".

Zyrus sang "Right Where I Belong" for the direct-to-DVD movie The Swan Princess: A Royal Family Tale (2014). Zyrus appeared on October 19, 2014, episode of Oprah: Where Are They Now?.

In 2015, Zyrus reunited with Foster to perform a version of Sam Smith's "Lay Me Down" on Asia's Got Talent.

== Artistry ==
=== Influences ===
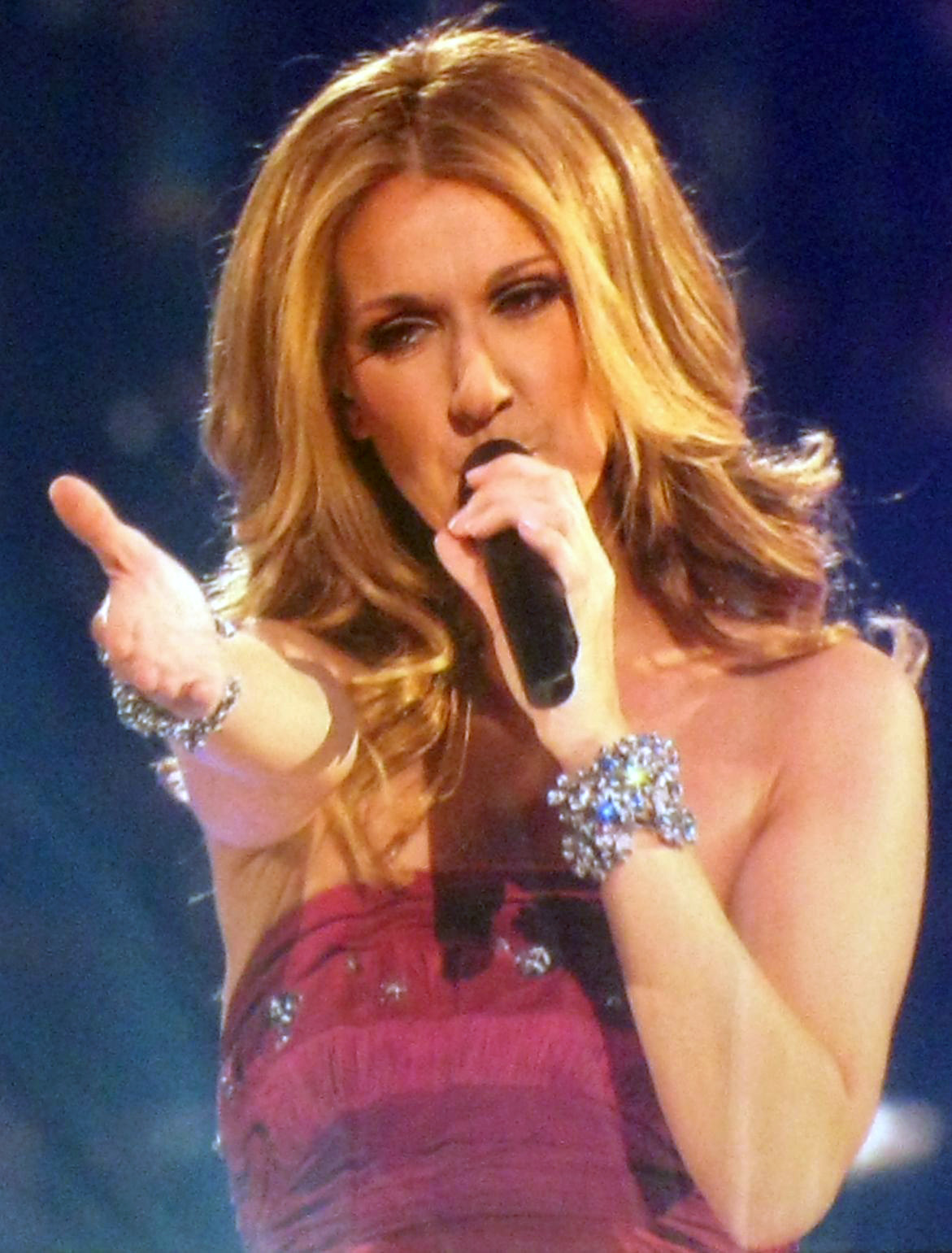
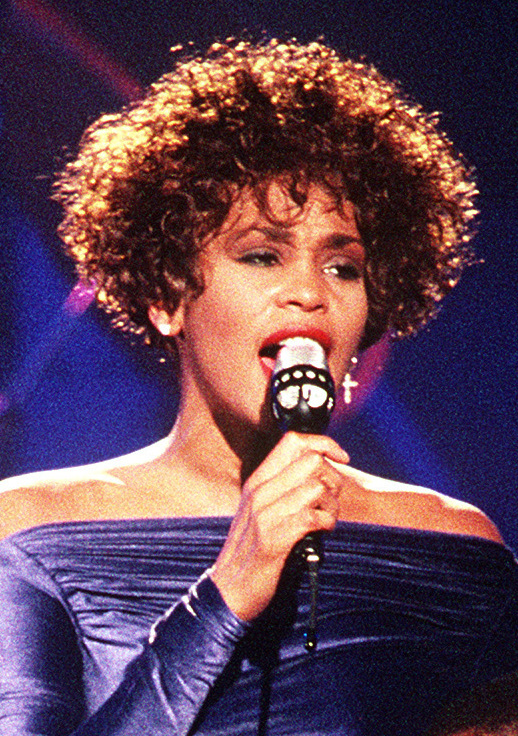
Celine Dion (left) and Whitney Houston (right) were two of Zyrus's major vocal influences.

In 2010, Zyrus said that his mother, a former pop vocalist, served as a primary musical influence; He begged her for singing lessons beginning at the age of four. Growing up, the family listened to many types of music, especially artists such as Celine Dion, Whitney Houston, Mariah Carey, and Destiny's Child. Zyrus has also expressed admiration for Lady Gaga and Beyoncé for attitude, fashion, and vocal style, and stated a wish to work with both of them someday. Zyrus was also a fan of Michael Jackson, and Justin Timberlake and wished to work with Eminem, Dr. Dre, Chris Brown and Ne-Yo. Zyrus performed "Earth Song" by Michael Jackson with Ne-Yo at the David Foster and Friends Special in Mandalay Bay, Las Vegas in October 2010.

=== Voice ===
Prior to his transition, when he was known as Charice, Zyrus received positive recognition for his vocal talents. In an ABC News interview, David Foster mentioned Zyrus' ability to mimic other people's voices, which, according to him, is a characteristic of good singers. In a separate interview, Josh Groban stated that Zyrus' voice is one of the most beautiful he had heard in a long time. Ryan Murphy, the executive music producer of the hit US television series Glee, said, "When that girl [sic] opens her mouth, angels fly out." Oprah's bookazine, Oprah's Farewell Celebration: Inside 25 Extraordinary Years of 'The Oprah Winfrey Show', mentioned Zyrus' "soaring soprano voice". After his transition from female to male, Zyrus received criticism that his gender transition destroyed [his] voice ... but [he] dreams of having an international following" again; an article in AsiaOne.com described his voice as an "increasingly confident tenor".

== Personal life ==
Raised in the Iglesia ni Cristo faith, Zyrus and younger brother Carl were baptized and confirmed into their mother's Roman Catholic faith on May 22, 2010, 12 days after Zyrus' 18th birthday, at the Pasig Cathedral in Pasig, Metro Manila, Philippines. The more than 40 godparents included ABS-CBN network president Charo Santos-Concio, producer Laurenti Dyogi, The Buzz hosts Boy Abunda and Kris Aquino, segment host and radio personality Jobert Sucaldito, TV Patrol news anchors Karen Davila and Julius Babao, and Star Records head Annabelle Regalado-Borja. Philippine Daily Inquirer columnists Emmie Velarde and Pocholo Concepcion were also included. Oprah Winfrey and David Foster, two principal sponsors who played a major role in Zyrus' ascent to international stardom, were unable to attend and instead sent their own representatives to the ceremony.

In October 2011, Zyrus' estranged father, 43-year-old construction worker Ricky Pempengco, was stabbed to death in the Philippines, forcing the cancellation of a concert in Singapore. Ricky had been at a small grocery store in San Pedro, Laguna, a city south of Metro Manila, when he brushed against a drunk man who became angry and stabbed him with an ice pick in the chest and back, according to the Laguna province police chief. Zyrus responded to the stabbing on Twitter: "I want to thank my fans from around the world for their support and love at this very difficult time for my family and I." "We are all very sad about this terrible tragedy" and "I loved him and I will still love him"; "He's still my Dad after all."

Zyrus' exploration of his gender identity was a subject of public interest. In March 2012, Zyrus faced harsh criticism from the Internet and the media after changing his hairstyle and fashion into a self-described "edgy and rock" look, responding: "I know some people think that this is very rebellious but it's not. It's just me evolving." On April 16, 2013, questions were raised after pictures surfaced online of Zyrus in masculine dress. In an interview, mother Raquel Pempengco said that she would respect her child's decision about his own identity. On May 28, The Philippine Star newspaper ran a story about Zyrus' 21st birthday party which was described as a "coming out of sorts". On June 2, 2013, Zyrus said that he identified as lesbian at that time during an interview with Boy Abunda at The Buzz in the Philippines, mentioning past relationships with other women in the industry. Nine months later, in March 2014, Zyrus debuted a new "boyish" look with much shorter hair cut and more tattoos. In a 2014 interview with Oprah Winfrey, Zyrus mentioned being attracted to girls since childhood and said "basically, my soul is male" but denied plans to pursue gender transition at that time.

In April 2017, Zyrus broke up with Alyssa Quijano, after four years of living together. In June 2017, on social media, Zyrus announced the adoption of his current name and the discontinuance of his former stage name, Charice. Subsequently, Zyrus disclosed that he had undergone gender-affirming chest surgery in March and had begun testosterone shots in April. In an interview with Papermag, he said "I am always thankful for the life of Charice that I experienced and the music that I shared, but that obviously belongs to her, it's not for me. I'm letting her go and be free." Zyrus published a memoir, I Am Jake, in 2018 and was featured in GQ in 2022.

Zyrus is currently in a relationship with singer Cheesa since June 2024.

== Awards and recognition ==
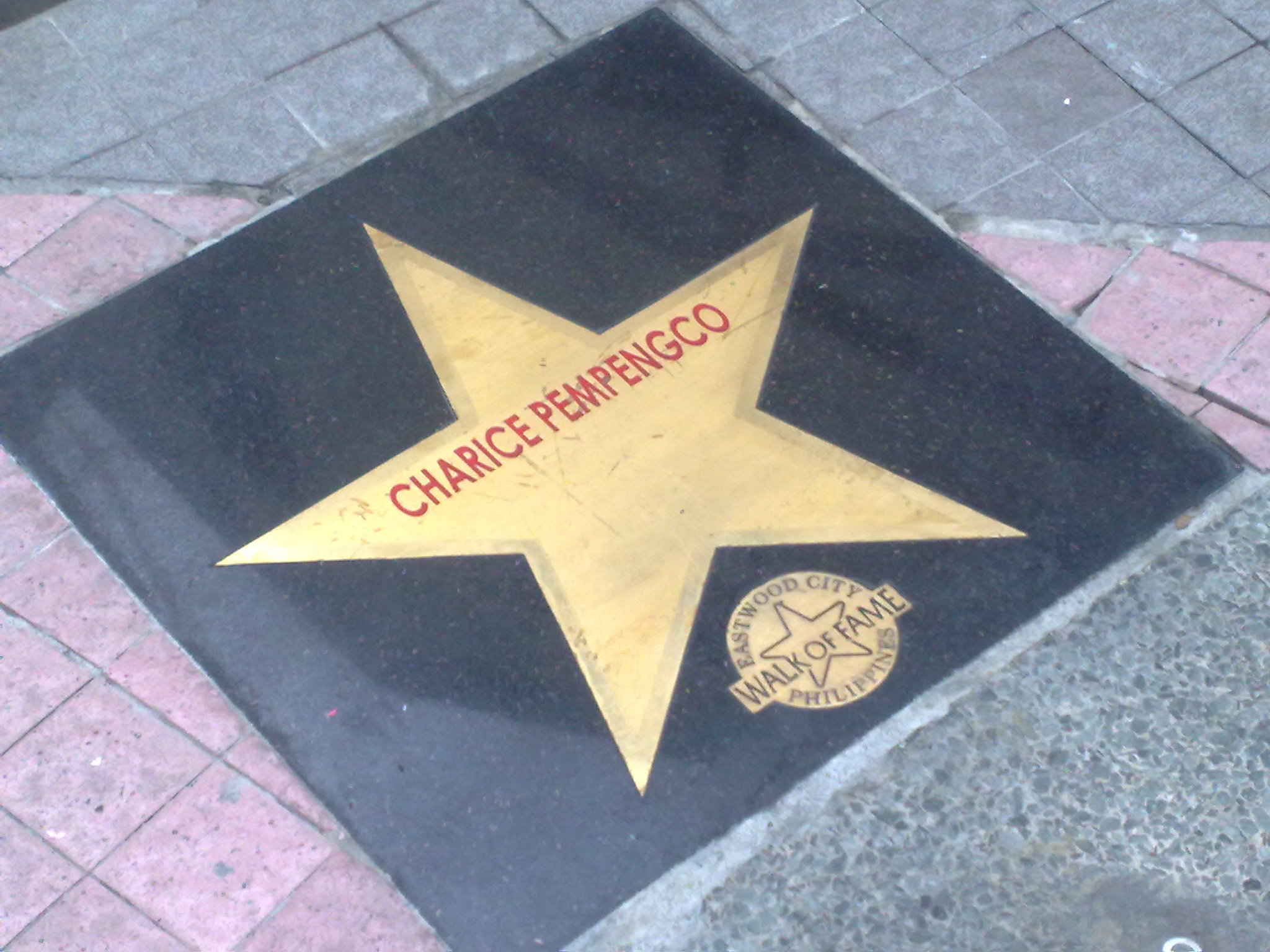
Zyrus' star, bearing the name "Charice Pempengco", his name prior to his gender transition, in the Eastwood City Walk of Fame, the Philippine equivalent of the Hollywood Walk of Fame.

- 3rd Place – Little Big Star Big Division, Season 1, 2005 Philippines
- Most Requested Foreign Act of 2007 – StarKing, South Korea
- The Ellen DeGeneres Show, USA
- Pinoy World Class Talent – 20th anniversary of the Music Museum, 2008, Philippines
- Key to the City of Rotterdam – Mayor Ivo Opstelten, 2008, the Netherlands
- Best New Female Recording Artist – Aliw Awards, 2008, Philippines
- Best New Female Artist 2008 – ALIW Awards: Philippines
- Newsmaker of the Year 2008, 2009 and 2010 – Balitang America, USA
- People of the Year 2008 – People Asia Magazine, 2009, Philippines
- Plaque of Recognition – The Spirit of EDSA Foundation, 2009, Philippines
- Special Citation Award – MYX Music Awards 2009, Philippines
- National Newsmaker of the Year 2008 – Ateneo de Davao University TAO Awards, 2009, Philippines
- Outstanding Global Achievement – 40th Box Office Entertainment Awards (Guillermo Awards), 2009, Philippines
- Best Selling Album of the Year – 22nd Awit Awards, 2009, Philippines
- Best Musical Performance of 2009 – The Oprah Winfrey Show, USA
- Person of the Year for 2009 – Philnews.com, Philippines
- MDWK Magazine's Top Newsmakers of 2009 – Asian Journal's MDWK Magazine, Philippines
- Fun, Fearless Female Award – Cosmopolitan Magazine Philippines, 2010
- 21 Under 21: Music's Hottest Minors (Number 4) – Billboard, 2010 USA
- Icon of Tomorrow – J-14 Magazine, 2010 USA
- BPInoy Award: Outstanding Filipino – Bank of the Philippine Islands, 2010 Philippines
- Best Inspirational or Religious Song (for "Always You") – 23rd Awit Awards, 2010, Philippines
- Number 4 in Yahoo!'s 2010 Most Irresistible Lyrics for "Pyramid" – Yahoo!, 2010
- Number 7 in Reader's Choice Favorite Album of 2010: Charice
- Best New Artist – J-Wave Tokio Hot 100 Awards 2011 (Japan)
- Female Concert Performer of the Year – 42nd Box Office Entertainment Awards, 2011, Philippines
- Number 11 in US Weekly's Hottest Glee Guests List: February 2011 (USA)
- Number 79 in Entertainment Weekly (USA, 2011)
- 2011 GMMSF Box-Office Entertainment Awards – Female Concert Performer of the Year
- BPinoy Award – Philippines
- Womanity Award Winner – Entertainment: Female Network's Womanity Awards
- Number 2 in Hottest Girl Chart: August 2011 issue of J-14 Magazine
- Coolest Female Singer Award: Yahoo! OMG Awards Philippines
- Best Major Concert (Female Category) – 24th Aliw Awards, 2011, Philippines
- Entertainer of the Year – 24th Aliw Awards, 2011, Philippines
- Favorite Asian Act – Nickelodeon Kids' Choice Awards 2012, [USA]

== Discography ==
=== Studio albums ===
- My Inspiration (2009)
- Charice (2010)
- Infinity (2011)
- Chapter 10 (2013)
- Catharsis (2016)

== Filmography ==
Note: Prior to his appearance on Tonight with Boy Abunda in 2017, Zyrus' gender identity as a trans man was not known to the wider public. He was credited as his pre-transition name "Charice" prior to this television appearance.

=== Film ===
Year	Film	Role	Notes
2009	Alvin and the Chipmunks: The Squeakquel	Himself	Cameo as a talent show contestant in the film's story.
2010	Celine: Through the Eyes of the World	Himself	Documentary-concert film
2012	Here Comes the Boom	Malia De La Cruz	

=== Television ===
Year	Title	Role	Notes
2005	Little Big Star	Himself/Contestant	3rd Placer (Big Division)
2005–present	ASAP	Himself/Performer	
2008	Maalaala Mo Kaya	Himself	Episode: "Ice Cream"
2010	May Bukas Pa	Choir member	Episode: "Final Chapter: Amen"
2010–2011	Glee	Sunshine Corazon	Season 2: Episode 2.01: "Audition"; Episode 2.17: "A Night of Neglect"; Episode 2.22: "New York"
2011	Charice: Home for Valentine's	Himself	GMA Network Valentine's special
2011	TV5 Presents: Christmas with Charice	Himself	TV5 Christmas special
2012	Charice: One for the Heart	Himself	GMA Network Valentine's special
2012	Kapamilya, Deal or No Deal	Himself/Guest Player	Player (June 23, 2012)
2012	The X Factor Philippines	Himself/Judge	Judge and mentor
2013	Celebrity Bluff	Himself/Guest Player	
2013	Magpakailanman	Himself	Episode: "The Charice Pempengco Story"
2013	The Voice of the Philippines	Himself/Guest performer	
2013	Kris TV	Himself/Guest	
2013	The Mega and the Songwriter	Himself/Guest performer	
2014	Oprah: Where Are They Now?	Himself	
2015	Asia's Got Talent	Himself/Guest Performer	
2015	Sunday PinaSaya	Himself/Guest Performer	
2016	Yan ang Morning!	Himself/Guest	
2017	Tonight with Boy Abunda	Himself/Guest	First post-transition TV Appearance under the name Jake Zyrus
2017	Maalaala Mo Kaya	Himself	Portrayed his adult self in a biographical episode.
