= Jennette McCurdy discography =

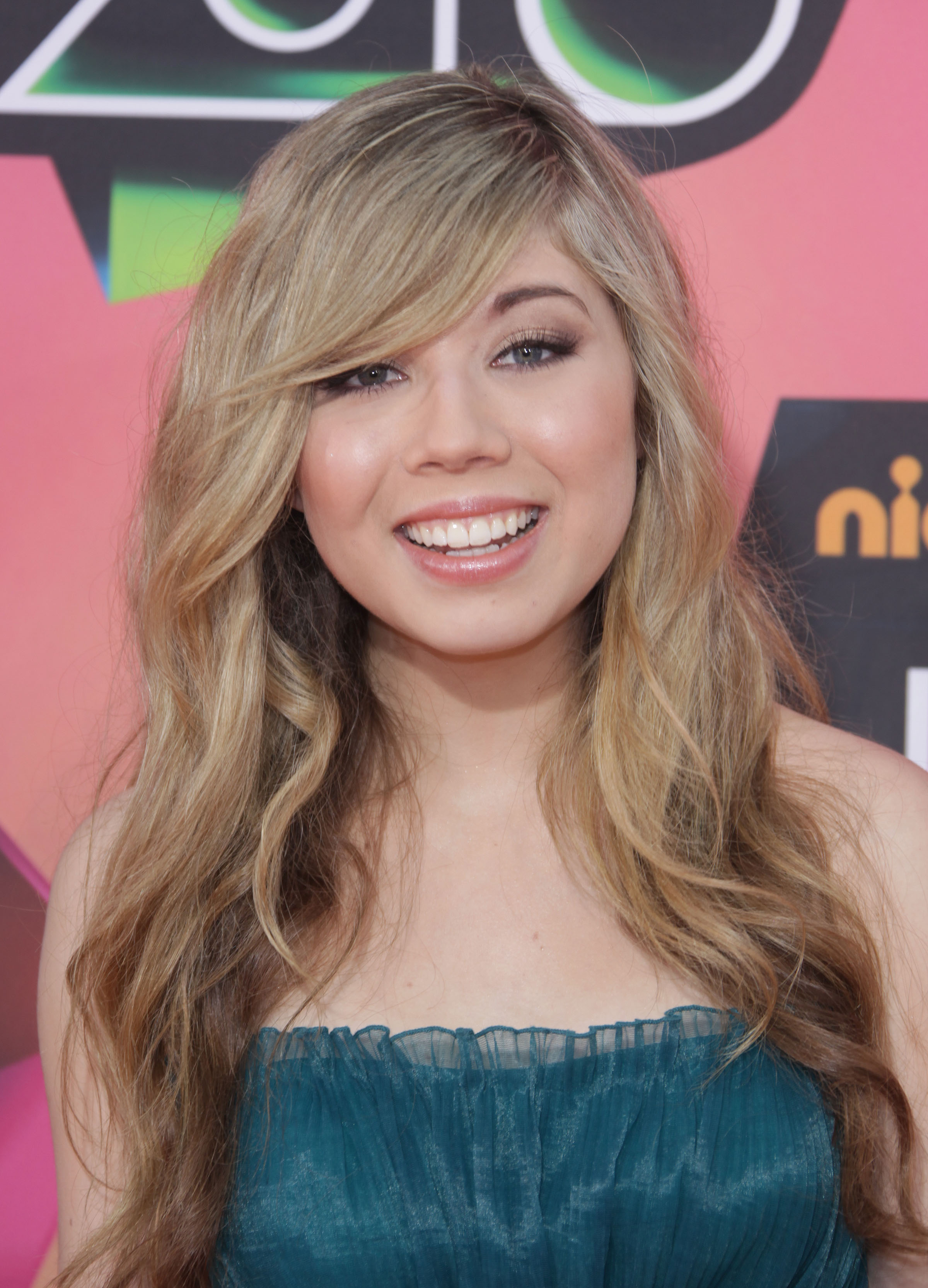
- McCurdy at the 2010 Kids' Choice Awards.
- Studio albums: 1
- EPs: 2
- Singles: 4
- Music videos: 2

American singer Jennette McCurdy has released one studio album, two extended plays, and four singles. McCurdy debuted as a country music artist with her independent single "So Close" in March 2009. Her second independent single, a cover of Amanda Stott's "Homeless Heart", was released in May 2009.

After gaining attention of multiple record labels, McCurdy ultimately signed to Capitol Records Nashville in June 2009 and begun writing songs for her debut album. Her debut single, "Not That Far Away", was released in May 2010, debuting and peaking at number 58 on the U.S. Billboard Hot Country Songs chart. Her debut extended play, Not That Far Away, was released on August 17, 2010. It debuted and peaked at number 32 on the Billboard Top Country Albums and number 3 on Billboard Top Heatseekers.

In March 2011, her second major label and most recent single, "Generation Love", was released digitally. Embarking on the "Generation Love for St. Jude" mall tour, McCurdy traveled to and performed at multiple different malls within the United States. All proceeds from the event went towards St. Jude Children's Research Hospital. The single was later sent to radio in April 2011, peaking at number 44 on the Billboard Hot Country Songs chart. McCurdy's debut studio album was planned to be released later that year, but was delayed to early 2012.

In January 2012, "Generation Love" was included on the iCarly soundtrack album, iSoundtrack II. Capitol Nashville announced that same month that McCurdy's eponymous debut album would be released exclusively to Justice stores later that month, but was delayed until February 8, 2012. Her full ten-track edition of the album was released later that year in June 2012 and is her most recent release. Her studio album was a commercial failure. Shortly after her album release, McCurdy left Capitol Nashville due to conflicts with other projects.

== Studio albums ==
List of studio albums
Title	Details
Jennette McCurdy	Release date: February 8, 2012; Formats: CD, digital download, streaming; Label: Capitol Nashville

== Extended plays ==
List of extended plays, with selected chart positions
Title	Details	Peak chart positions	
Title	Details	US Country	US Heat.
Not That Far Away	Release date: August 17, 2010; Formats: Digital download; Label: Capitol Nashville	32	3
Jennette McCurdy	Release date: February 8, 2012; Formats: CD; Label: Capitol Nashville	—	—
"—" denotes releases that did not chart or were not released in that territory.

== Singles ==
List of singles, showing year released
Title	Year	Peak chart positions	Album
Title	Year	US Country	Album
"So Close"	2009	—	Non-album singles
"Homeless Heart"	2009	—	Non-album singles
"Not That Far Away"	2010	58	Not That Far Away
"Generation Love"	2011	44	Jennette McCurdy
"—" denotes releases that did not chart or were not released in that territory.

== Music videos ==
List of music videos, showing year released and director
Title	Year	Director	Ref.
"Not That Far Away"	2010	Roman White	
"Generation Love"	2011	Roman White	
