= List of The New York Times number-one books of 2022 =

The American daily newspaper The New York Times publishes multiple weekly lists ranking the best-selling books in the United States. The lists are split into three genres—fiction, nonfiction and children's books. Both the fiction and nonfiction lists are further split into multiple lists.

== Fiction ==
The following list ranks the number-one best-selling fiction books, in the combined print and e-books category.

For the third year, the most frequent weekly best seller of the year was Where the Crawdads Sing by Delia Owens with 12 weeks at the top of the list, followed closely by It Ends with Us by Colleen Hoover with 11 weeks at the top of the list. Colleen Hoover was also the most frequent weekly best-selling author with 19 weeks at the top of the list.

Issue date	Title	Author(s)	Publisher	Ref.
January 2	Call Us What We Carry	Amanda Gorman	Viking Books	
January 9	The Judge's List	John Grisham	Doubleday	
January 16	It Ends with Us	Colleen Hoover	Atria Books	
January 23	It Ends with Us	Colleen Hoover	Atria Books	
January 30	It Ends with Us	Colleen Hoover	Atria Books	
February 6	It Ends with Us	Colleen Hoover	Atria Books	
February 13	It Ends with Us	Colleen Hoover	Atria Books	
February 20	It Ends with Us	Colleen Hoover	Atria Books	
February 27	Abandoned in Death	J. D. Robb	St. Martin's Press	
March 6	House of Sky and Breath	Sarah J. Maas	Bloomsbury Publishing	
March 13	The Paris Apartment	Lucy Foley	William Morrow	
March 20	Hook, Line, and Sinker	Tessa Bailey	Avon	
March 27	Run, Rose, Run	Dolly Parton and James Patterson	Little, Brown and Company	
April 3	The Match	Harlan Coben	Grand Central Publishing	
April 10	Where the Crawdads Sing	Delia Owens	G. P. Putnam's Sons	
April 17	Where the Crawdads Sing	Delia Owens	G. P. Putnam's Sons	
April 24	It Ends with Us	Colleen Hoover	Atria Books	
May 1	The Investigator	John Sandford	G. P. Putnam's Sons	
May 8	Dream Town	David Baldacci	Grand Central Publishing	
May 15	It Ends with Us	Colleen Hoover	Atria Books	
May 22	Book Lovers	Emily Henry	Berkley Books	
May 29	Book Lovers	Emily Henry	Berkley Books	
June 5	In the Blood	Jack Carr	Emily Bestler Books	
June 12	Nightwork	Nora Roberts	St. Martin's Press	
June 19	Sparring Partners	John Grisham	Doubleday	
June 26	It Ends with Us	Colleen Hoover	Atria Books	
July 3	The Hotel Nantucket	Elin Hilderbrand	Little, Brown and Company	
July 10	Where the Crawdads Sing	Delia Owens	G. P. Putnam's Sons	
July 17	Where the Crawdads Sing	Delia Owens	G. P. Putnam's Sons	
July 24	Where the Crawdads Sing	Delia Owens	G. P. Putnam's Sons	
July 31	Where the Crawdads Sing	Delia Owens	G. P. Putnam's Sons	
August 7	Where the Crawdads Sing	Delia Owens	G. P. Putnam's Sons	
August 14	Where the Crawdads Sing	Delia Owens	G. P. Putnam's Sons	
August 21	Where the Crawdads Sing	Delia Owens	G. P. Putnam's Sons	
August 28	Where the Crawdads Sing	Delia Owens	G. P. Putnam's Sons	
September 4	Where the Crawdads Sing	Delia Owens	G. P. Putnam's Sons	
September 11	It Ends with Us	Colleen Hoover	Atria Books	
September 18	It Ends with Us	Colleen Hoover	Atria Books	
September 25	Fairy Tale	Stephen King	Scribner	
October 2	Where the Crawdads Sing	Delia Owens	G. P. Putnam's Sons	
October 9	Dreamland	Nicholas Sparks	Random House	
October 16	Verity	Colleen Hoover	Grand Central Publishing	
October 23	Righteous Prey	John Sandford	G. P. Putnam's Sons	
October 30	Long Shadows	David Baldacci	Grand Central Publishing	
November 6	It Starts with Us	Colleen Hoover	Atria Books	
November 13	It Starts with Us	Colleen Hoover	Atria Books	
November 20	It Starts with Us	Colleen Hoover	Atria Books	
November 27	It Starts with Us	Colleen Hoover	Atria Books	
December 4	It Starts with Us	Colleen Hoover	Atria Books	
December 11	It Starts with Us	Colleen Hoover	Atria Books	
December 18	A World of Curiosities	Louise Penny	Minotaur Books	
December 25	It Starts with Us	Colleen Hoover	Atria Books	

== Nonfiction ==
The following list ranks the number-one best-selling nonfiction books, in the combined print and e-books category.

Issue date	Title	Author(s)	Publisher	Ref.
January 2	The 1619 Project	Nikole Hannah-Jones and The New York Times Magazine	One World	
January 9	The Storyteller	Dave Grohl	Dey Street Books	
January 16	The 1619 Project	Nikole Hannah-Jones and The New York Times Magazine	One World	
January 23	Unthinkable	Jamie Raskin	Harper	
January 30	The Body Keeps the Score	Bessel van der Kolk	Penguin Books	
February 6	Enough Already	Valerie Bertinelli	Harvest	
February 13	Red-Handed	Peter Schweizer	Harper	
February 20	Red-Handed	Peter Schweizer	Harper	
February 27	Red-Handed	Peter Schweizer	Harper	
March 6	From Strength to Strength	Arthur C. Brooks	Portfolio	
March 13	Red-Handed	Peter Schweizer	Harper	
March 20	The Body Keeps the Score	Bessel van der Kolk	Penguin Books	
March 27	One Damn Thing After Another	William P. Barr	William Morrow	
April 3	One Damn Thing After Another	William P. Barr	William Morrow	
April 10	The Body Keeps the Score	Bessel van der Kolk	Penguin Books	
April 17	The Body Keeps the Score	Bessel van der Kolk	Penguin Books	
April 24	Bittersweet	Susan Cain	Crown	
May 1	Freezing Order	Bill Browder	Simon & Schuster	
May 8	The Body Keeps the Score	Bessel van der Kolk	Penguin Books	
May 15	Finding Me	Viola Davis	HarperOne	
May 22	Killing the Killers	Bill O'Reilly and Martin Dugard	St. Martin's Press	
May 29	Killing the Killers	Bill O'Reilly and Martin Dugard	St. Martin's Press	
June 5	The Office BFFs	Jenna Fischer and Angela Kinsey	Dey Street Books	
June 12	Here's the Deal	Kellyanne Conway	Threshold Editions	
June 19	Happy-Go-Lucky	David Sedaris	Little, Brown and Company	
June 26	James Patterson	James Patterson	Little, Brown and Company	
July 3	Battle for the American Mind	Pete Hegseth with David Goodwin	Broadside Books	
July 10	Battle for the American Mind	Pete Hegseth with David Goodwin	Broadside Books	
July 17	Battle for the American Mind	Pete Hegseth with David Goodwin	Broadside Books	
July 24	The Body Keeps the Score	Bessel van der Kolk	Penguin Books	
July 31	Tanqueray	Stephanie Johnson and Brandon Stanton	St. Martin's Press	
August 7	The Body Keeps the Score	Bessel van der Kolk	Penguin Books	
August 14	The Body Keeps the Score	Bessel van der Kolk	Penguin Books	
August 21	The Body Keeps the Score	Bessel van der Kolk	Penguin Books	
August 28	I'm Glad My Mom Died	Jennette McCurdy	Simon & Schuster	
September 4	I'm Glad My Mom Died	Jennette McCurdy	Simon & Schuster	
September 11	I'm Glad My Mom Died	Jennette McCurdy	Simon & Schuster	
September 18	I'm Glad My Mom Died	Jennette McCurdy	Simon & Schuster	
September 25	I'm Glad My Mom Died	Jennette McCurdy	Simon & Schuster	
October 2	I'm Glad My Mom Died	Jennette McCurdy	Simon & Schuster	
October 9	I'm Glad My Mom Died	Jennette McCurdy	Simon & Schuster	
October 16	I'm Glad My Mom Died	Jennette McCurdy	Simon & Schuster	
October 23	Confidence Man	Maggie Haberman	Penguin Press	
October 30	Confidence Man	Maggie Haberman	Penguin Press	
November 6	Beyond the Wand	Tom Felton	Grand Central Publishing	
November 13	Radio's Greatest of All Time	Rush Limbaugh with Kathryn Adams Limbaugh and David Limbaugh	Threshold Editions	
November 20	Friends, Lovers, and the Big Terrible Thing	Matthew Perry	Flatiron Books	
November 27	Friends, Lovers, and the Big Terrible Thing	Matthew Perry	Flatiron Books	
December 4	The Light We Carry	Michelle Obama	Crown	
December 11	The Light We Carry	Michelle Obama	Crown	
December 18	The Light We Carry	Michelle Obama	Crown	
December 25	The Light We Carry	Michelle Obama	Crown	

== See also ==
- Publishers Weekly list of bestselling novels in the United States in the 2020s
