= Lucia Osborne-Crowley =

British–Australian writer

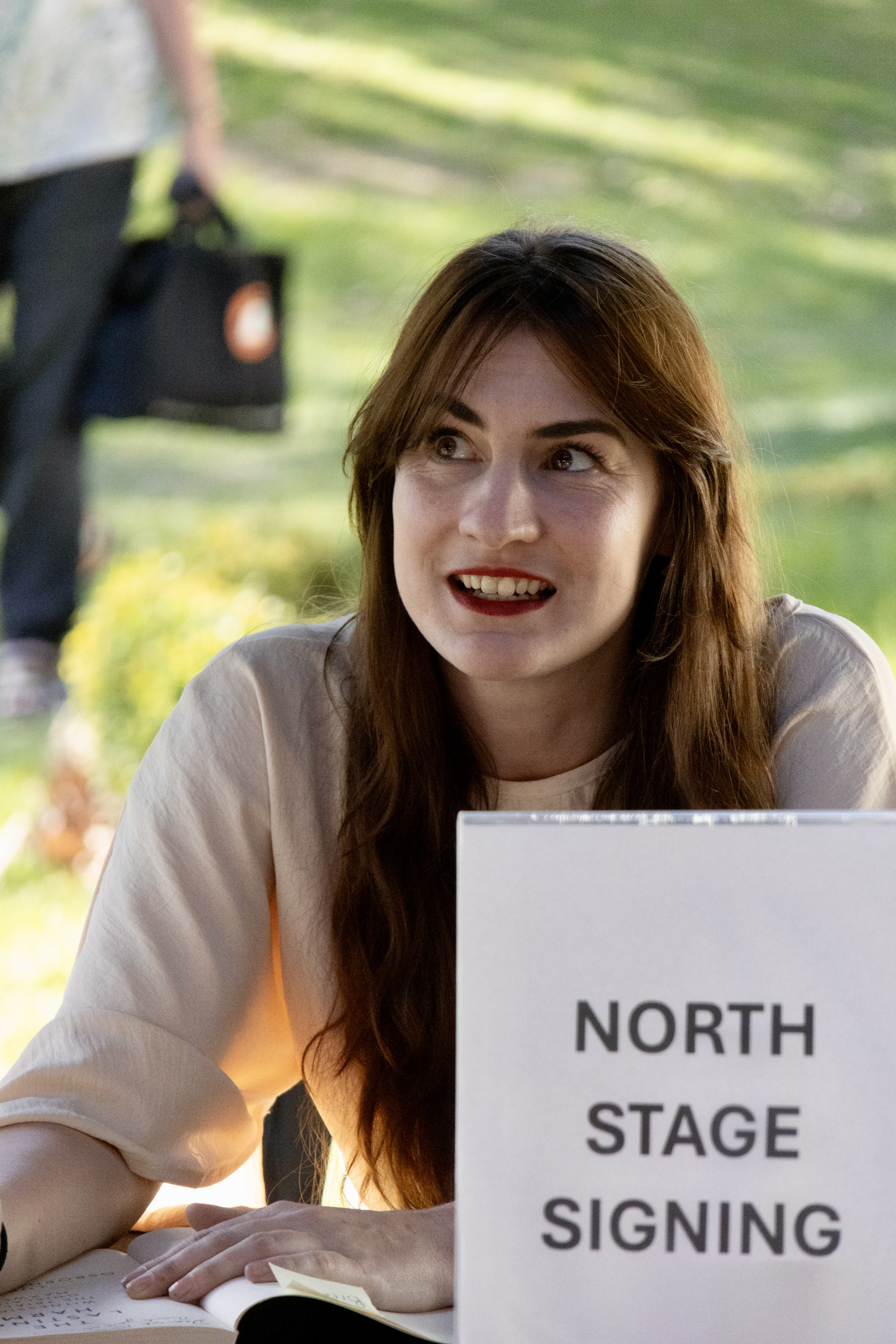
Osborne-Crowley at the 2025 Adelaide Writers' Week

Lucia Osborne-Crowley is a British–Australian writer, living in London. She has published three books, titled I Choose Elena (2019), My Body Keeps Your Secrets (2021) and The Lasting Harm (2024). Her books have been awarded literary prizes and have been published in several territories and many different languages.

== Early life and education ==
Osborne-Crowley was born in London and raised in Brisbane and Sydney, Australia. She was a national gymnastics champion and represented Australia internationally in 2003 and 2004. She graduated with a degree in international studies from the University of Sydney in 2013 and with a Juris Doctor degree from the University of New South Wales in 2018. In 2023, she was accepted into the PhD creative writing program at the University of East Anglia.

== Career ==
Osborne-Crowley is a writer and journalist. Her first book, I Choose Elena was published in 2019. The book is a memoir "in which she recounts her experience of suffering a violent rape as a teenager, leading to years of chronic illness, anxiety and an eating disorder." In My Body Keeps Your Secrets (2021) she uses "a hybrid of academic prose, memoir and reportage" to tell stories of trauma and recovery. This book won the Somerset Maugham Prize for literature in 2022.

Her third book, The Lasting Harm, was published by HarperCollins in 2024. and has received prize recognition from eight different literary award panels. It won the People's Choice Award at the 2025 New South Wales Literary Awards and the 2025 Davitt Award for Non-Fiction. It was shortlisted for the 2025 Gordon Burn Prize for Literature, the 2025 Victorian Premier's Prize for Nonfiction, the Ned Kelly Award for True Crime, and the Douglas Stewart Prize for Nonfiction. It was longlisted for the Walkley Book Award. and the Nib Literary Award.

== Publications ==
- I Choose Elena: On Trauma, Memory and Survival. Mood Indigo Book 2. London: Indigo, 2020. ISBN 9781999683399.
- My Body Keeps Your Secrets: Dispatches on Shame and Reclamation. London: Indigo, 2021. ISBN 9781911648130.
- The Lasting Harm: Witnessing the Trial of Ghislaine Maxwell. London: Fourth Estate, 2024. ISBN 9780008591182.

== See also ==
- The Body Keeps the Score by Bessel van der Kolk
