= Days Like This =

Days Like This may refer to:

- Days Like This (Van Morrison album), 1995
- "Days Like This" (Van Morrison song), 1995
- Days Like This (Krezip album), 2002
- Days Like This, an album by Tony Stevens, 2025
- "Days Like This", a song by Sheena Easton on The Lover In Me (album), 1989
- "Days Like This" (Rachel Proctor song), 2003
- "Days Like This" 2023 song by Martin Jensen and Jay Sean
- Days Like This (Radio Ulster), a radio programme broadcast on BBC Radio Ulster
- Days Like This (film), a 2001 film directed by Mikael Håfström

== See also ==
- "Mama Said" (The Shirelles song)
