= Half His Age =

2026 novel by Jennette McCurdy

- Author: Jennette McCurdy
- Language: English
- Publisher: Ballantine Books
- Publication date: January 20, 2026
- Pages: 288
- ISBN: 9780593723739

Half His Age is the second book and first novel by Jennette McCurdy. It was published by Ballantine Books on January 20, 2026. The novel follows Waldo, a 17-year-old high school student, as she becomes involved in a relationship with her teacher, Mr. Korgy. McCurdy has described the novel as an exploration of female rage, power, and desire, drawing from her own experiences.

== Development ==
In 2022, Publishers Weekly reported that McCurdy signed a two-book, seven-figure deal with Ballantine for a debut novel. Announcement coverage described the novel as McCurdy's first book following her best-selling memoir I'm Glad My Mom Died.

=== Inspiration and writing ===
In an interview with The New York Times, McCurdy said an age-gap relationship she experienced at 18 was a "jumping-off point" for the novel, but emphasized that it is not autobiographical. She said she was working on another novel when Half His Age began "pushing itself up," driven by Waldo's voice, adding that the character's suppressed anger is a "key element of her arc." McCurdy said she aimed to avoid a moralistic framing, including by having Waldo initiate the relationship and portraying her as "aggressive" and "bold," characterizing discomfort as a deliberate effect rather than something to be softened for the reader. She also said she revised early drafts in which she depicted Mr. Korgy as "too villainous," noting he "did not read believable." McCurdy said that as she worked through drafts, she recognized unprocessed anger from her past as an emotional driver behind the novel.

== Publication ==
Half His Age was published by Ballantine Books on January 20, 2026. The book was released in hardcover, e-book, and audiobook formats. The cover is a close-up photograph of a young woman sucking her middle finger; coverage of the novel noted the image may make some readers uncomfortable.

== Plot summary ==
Waldo, a 17-year-old high school senior in Anchorage, Alaska, lives with her mother and often functions as the caretaker in their household. As her mother's instability and neglect leave Waldo increasingly isolated, she becomes drawn to the possibility of attention, control, and escape elsewhere in her life.

Waldo becomes involved in a sexual relationship with her creative writing teacher, Mr. Korgy, who is 40 years old and married, with a child. She continues the relationship for a year, often feeling frustrated at Mr. Korgy's lack of care and immaturity despite his age. What initially seems to Waldo like a source of agency and intimacy is increasingly shaped by the imbalance in age, power, and emotional maturity between them.

Over the course of the novel, Waldo confronts the distance between the meaning she projects onto the relationship and the reality of Mr. Korgy's selfishness and inadequacy. As the relationship deteriorates, the novel follows her through loneliness, disillusionment, and a painful reckoning with the power dynamics that have defined it.

== Reception ==
Publishers Weekly called it a "provocative" debut, while The Guardian described the book as "bleak and funny." In The New York Times Book Review, Brittany Newell called it a "reverse Lolita" that rewards "fearless" readers, likening its momentum to a slasher film while praising McCurdy's portrayal of disaffected girlhood. Reviewing the novel for The Washington Post, Sophia Nguyen wrote that it aims to unsettle readers and moves tonally between comedy and discomfort, while suggesting that some of its more reflective turns feel comparatively conventional. Sophie Gilbert of The Atlantic argued that the book is "resolutely not" a straightforward exploitation narrative, instead framing it as an examination of longing and consumer culture, though she found it stronger in its first half than its second. Kirkus Reviews described the novel as having "bright spots" but criticized it as "unbalanced and lacking in finesse." Writing for Vulture, Fran Hoepfner said that while McCurdy gives Waldo "depth and contradiction," the novel often falls back on repetitive sex scenes and shock value.

The book debuted at number two on the Publishers Weekly Bestseller Lists selling 30,761 units in its first week.

== See also ==
- My Dark Vanessa
