= So Close =

So Close may refer to:

== Movies ==
- So Close (film), a 2002 Hong Kong action film

== Music ==
=== Albums ===
- So Close (album), by Dina Carroll, 1993

=== Songs ===
- "So Close" (Diana Ross song), 1983
- "So Close" (Hall & Oates song), 1990
- "So Close" (Enchanted song), 2007
- "So Close" (NOTD and Felix Jaehn song), 2018
- "So Close", by Jake Holmes from So Close, So Very Far To Go, 1970
- "So Close", by Raven from Glow, 1994
- "So Close", by Alice in Chains from their self-titled album, 1995
- "So Close", by Evanescence from Evanescence EP, 1998
- "So Close", by Six by Seven from The Way I Feel Today, 2002
- "So Close", by Bethany Dillon from Stop & Listen, 2009
- "So Close", by Jennette McCurdy, 2009
- "So Close", by Brandon Lake with Amanda Cook from Help!, 2022

== See also ==
- So Close, So Far, a 2005 Iranian film
- "So Close, So Far" (song), by Hoobastank, 2009
