= Jennette McCurdy (EP) =

EP by Jennette McCurdy
- Released: February 8, 2012
- Recorded: 2010–2012
- Studio: Warner Studios (Nashville); The Grip; Blackbird Studios
- Genre: Country; country pop
- Length: 23:32
- Label: Capitol Nashville; EMI
- Producer: Paul Worley; Jay DeMarcus

Jennette McCurdy chronology
Not That Far Away (2010)	Jennette McCurdy (2012)	Jennette McCurdy (2012)

Jennette McCurdy is the self-titled second extended play by American former singer Jennette McCurdy, released on February 8, 2012, by Capitol Records Nashville. Originally scheduled for release on January 24, 2012, Jennette McCurdy was released exclusively as a CD to Justice stores to promote McCurdy's then-upcoming eponymous debut studio album. Songs previously released on her debut EP, Not That Far Away, were included along with her 2011 single, "Generation Love" and material previously not released.

== Background ==
Originally intended to be her debut studio album titled The Story of My Life, McCurdy instead released her debut extended play, Not That Far Away. Her debut studio album was planned to be released in fall 2011, but was delayed to early 2012. Capitol Nashville further delayed the release of her album in January 2012, instead releasing Jennette McCurdy EP.

== Track listing ==
Jennette McCurdy EP
No.	Title	Writer(s)	Length
1.	"Generation Love"	Ross Copperman; Tom Douglas; Heather Morgan	3:39
2.	"Don't You Just Hate Those People"	Mallary Hope; Tony Martin; Wendell Mobley	2:54
3.	"Break Your Heart"	Hope; Mobley; Jennifer Schott	3:25
4.	"Stronger"	Jennette McCurdy; Blair Daly; Rachel Proctor	3:28
5.	"Better"	McCurdy; Tommy Lee James; Liz Rose	3:14
6.	"Put Your Arms Around Someone"	McCurdy; Jessi Alexander; Luke Laird	3:11
7.	"Have to Say Goodbye"	McCurdy; Alexander; Laird	3:49

Website bonus download
No.	Title	Writer(s)	Length
8.	"Broken Umbrella"	Josh Kear; Mark Irwin; Chris Tompkins	3:19

== Personnel ==
Credits adapted from EP's liner notes.

- Jennette McCurdy – lead vocals, background vocals, songwriting
- Paul Worley – production, electric guitar
- Jay DeMarcus – production
- Chris McHugh – drums
- Mark Hill – bass
- Ilya Toshinsky – acoustic guitar
- Tom Bukovac – electric guitar
- Charlie Judge – keyboards
- Paul Franklin – steel guitar
- Russell Terrell – background vocals
- Jonathan Yudkin – fiddle, mandolin, strings
- Hillary Lindsey – background vocals
- Chad Cromwell – drums
- David Huff – drum loop, digital editing
- Micheal Rojas – piano, B3, synth, accordion
- Alison Prestwood – bass
- Rob McNelley – electric guitar
- Chris Rodriguez – electric guitar, harmony vocals
- Biff Waston – acoustic guitar
- Tania Hancheroff – harmony vocals
- Wes Hightower – harmony vocals
- Bruce Bouton – steel
- Kenny Greenberg – electric guitar
- Erik Hellerman – assistant engineer
- John Naiper – assistant engineer
- Adam Ayan – mastering
- Andrew Mendelson – mastering
- Steve Blackmoon – mixing assistant
- Andrew Bazinet – mixing assistant
- Sean Neff – digital editing
- Daniel Bacigalupi – mastering assistant
- Natthaphol Abhigantaphand – mastering assistant
- Shelley Anderson – mastering assistant
- Paige Conners – production coordination
- Justin Niebank – mixing
- Drew Bollman – mixing assistant
- Mike "Frog" Griffith – production coordination
- Jeremy Witt – production assistant
- Clarke Schleicher – mixing
- Joanna Carter – art director
- Michelle Hall – art production
- Kristin Barlowe – photography
- Bibi Bielat – design

== Release history ==
Release dates and formats for Jennette McCurdy EP
Region	Date	Format(s)	Label
United States	February 8, 2012	CD	Capitol Nashville; EMI
