= Jennette McCurdy =

American writer and actress (born 1992)

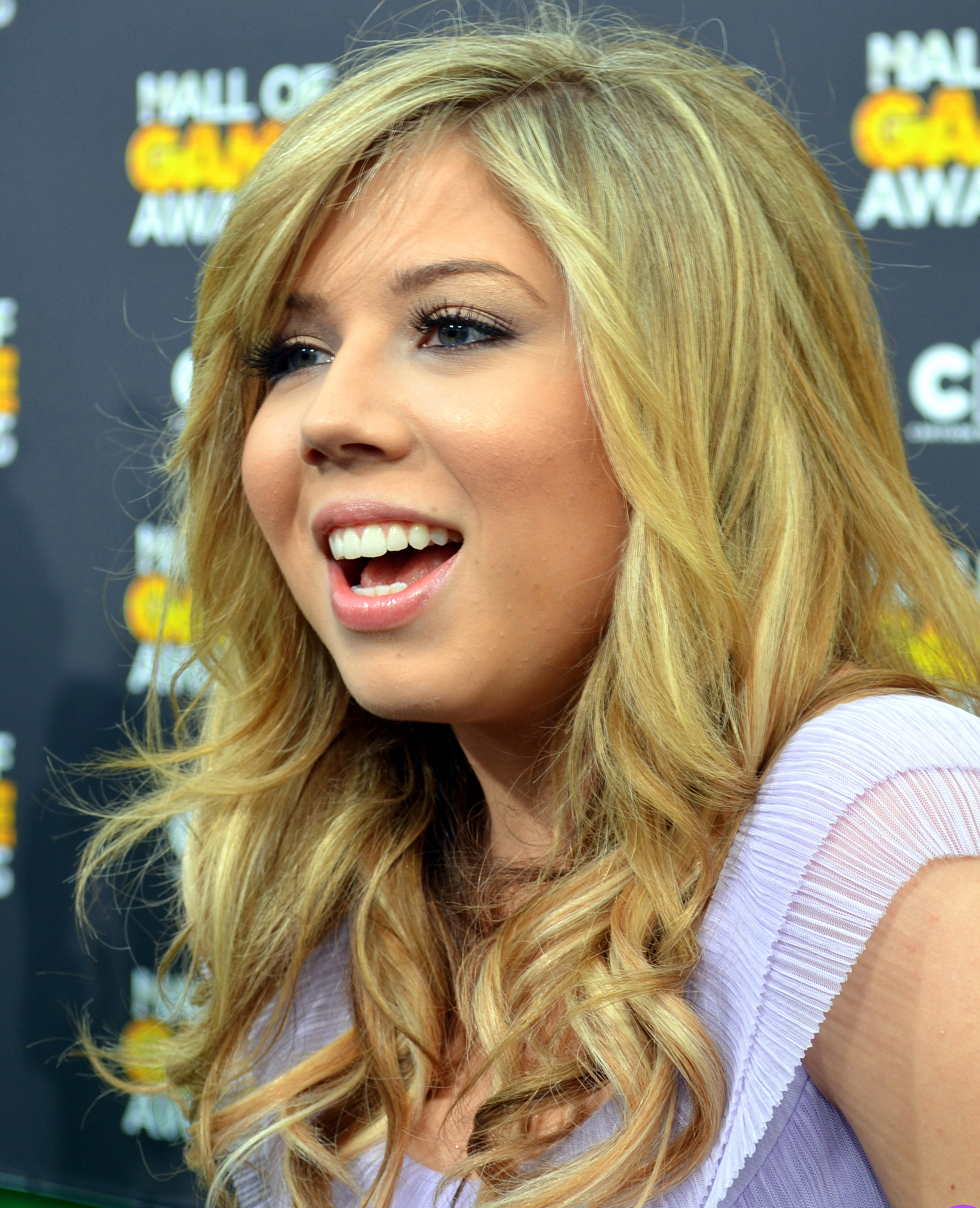
- McCurdy at the 2012 Hall of Game Awards
- Born: June 26, 1992 (age 34); Long Beach, California, U.S.
- Occupations: Writer; actress; singer
- Years active: 2000–present (Note: McCurdy began her writing career in 2022; her acting career spanned from 2000 to 2018.)
- Musical career
- Genres: Country; country pop
- Instrument: Vocals
- Works: Discography
- Labels: Capitol Nashville; EMI
- Website: jennettemccurdy.com

Jennette McCurdy (born June 26, 1992) is an American writer and former actress. Her breakthrough role as Sam Puckett in the Nickelodeon sitcom iCarly (2007–2012) won her four Nickelodeon Kids' Choice Awards. She reprised the character in the iCarly spin-off series Sam & Cat (2013–2014) before leaving Nickelodeon. She also appeared in the television series Malcolm in the Middle (2003–2005), Zoey 101 (2005), Lincoln Heights (2007), True Jackson, VP (2009–2010), and Victorious (2012). She produced, wrote, and starred in her own webseries, What's Next for Sarah? (2014), and led the science-fiction series Between (2015–2016).

McCurdy independently released her debut single, "So Close", in 2009. She released her debut EP, Not That Far Away, in 2010, followed in 2012 by a self-titled EP and a self-titled studio album. The lead single, "Generation Love", reached number 44 on the Billboard Hot Country Songs.

In 2018, McCurdy quit acting to pursue a career in writing and directing. In 2022, she released a memoir, I'm Glad My Mom Died, which quickly topped bestseller lists and received critical acclaim for her description of the pressures she faced as a child star and the abusive behavior of her since-deceased mother. In 2025, McCurdy began adapting the memoir into a television series of the same name. In 2026, she released her second book and debut novel, Half His Age.

== Early life and education ==
McCurdy was born on June 26, 1992, at Long Beach Memorial Medical Center in Long Beach, California. She was raised nearby in Garden Grove, in a middle-class family. They were members of The Church of Jesus Christ of Latter-day Saints, though she ultimately left the religion in early adulthood. Her mother, Debra (née LaBeaf) McCurdy (1957–2013), homeschooled her and her three older brothers. McCurdy describes her earliest memories as being ones "very weighted in tragedy" as a result of her mother's cancer diagnosis. McCurdy's grandparents lived with her family.

McCurdy's mother was a compulsive hoarder, which reportedly began after her cancer diagnosis. McCurdy said that their house was "overwhelmed" with clutter and that she and her brothers slept on Costco trifold gymnastic mats in the living room because their "bedrooms are so filled with stuff that you can't even determine where the beds are, let alone sleep in them".

Mark McCurdy, Debra's husband whom McCurdy grew up believing was her biological father, worked two jobs to support the family. After Debra's death, McCurdy learned that she was not his biological child.

== Career ==
=== Acting ===
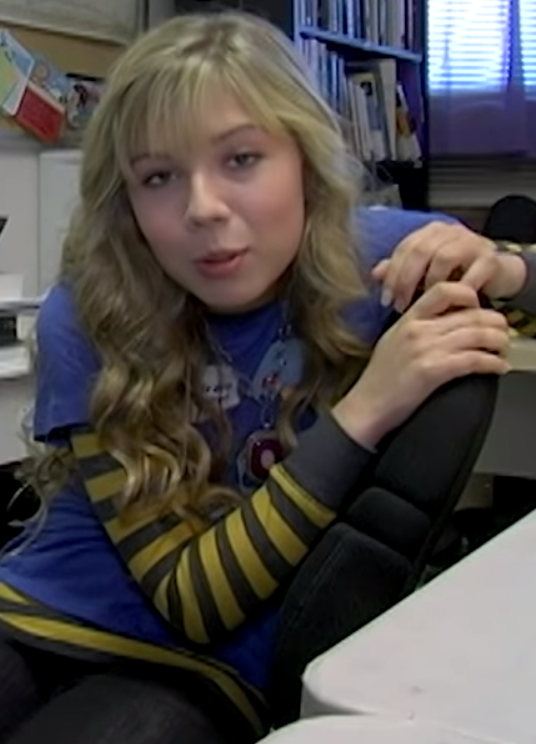
McCurdy, c. 2009, wearing the signature attire of Sam Puckett, her character in iCarly

In 2000, at the age of eight, McCurdy started her acting career on the adult comedy sketch show Mad TV. She then appeared in several television series, including CSI: Crime Scene Investigation, Malcolm in the Middle, Lincoln Heights, Will & Grace, Zoey 101, True Jackson VP, Law and Order SVU, Medium, Judging Amy, The Inside, Karen Sisco, Over There, and Close to Home.

In 2003, she acted in the feature film Hollywood Homicide. In 2005, she was nominated for a Young Artist Award for "Best Performance in a Television Series – Guest Starring Young Actress" for her performance in drama series Strong Medicine. She also appeared in a commercial for Sprint Corporation.

From 2007 to 2012, she starred as Sam Puckett in the Nickelodeon TV series iCarly. In 2008, she was nominated for a Young Artist Award for her work on the series and her performance as Dory Sorenson in the TV movie The Last Day of Summer. She was nominated for a 2009 Teen Choice Award in the Favorite TV Sidekick category for her work on iCarly. She played Bertha in Fred: The Movie, a movie based on a YouTube series about Fred Figglehorn.

McCurdy starred alongside Ariana Grande in the Nickelodeon series Sam & Cat, reprising her role as Sam Puckett, with Grande reprising her role as Cat Valentine from Victorious. The series' plot centers on the girls becoming roommates and starting their own babysitting business. It premiered on June 8, 2013. In 2014, McCurdy was absent from the Nickelodeon Kids' Choice Awards. Explaining her absence, McCurdy stated that Nickelodeon put her in an "uncomfortable, compromising, unfair situation" where she had to look out for herself. The network placed Sam & Cat into hiatus. The network initially stated that the hiatus was planned and that the series was not cancelled. On July 13, 2014, Nickelodeon announced that after one season, Sam & Cat was cancelled. In an interview on Entertainment Pop, McCurdy mentioned that she later made up with Grande.

In McCurdy's 2022 memoir I'm Glad My Mom Died, she describes incidents at Nickelodeon, such as when she was photographed in a bikini at a wardrobe fitting, and being encouraged to drink alcohol while underage by a person she identified as "the Creator". She stated that after the cancelation of Sam & Cat, Nickelodeon later offered her $300,000 to agree not to discuss her experiences at the network; she turned down the offer.

On August 13, 2014, McCurdy launched the online show What's Next for Sarah?. She served as the star of the series as well as the writer of the show, along with duties as executive producer and editor. McCurdy says that the show is based loosely on her life and that the character she plays, Sarah Bronson, is based on her. In 2015, she began starring in the Netflix drama series Between. While critics acknowledged McCurdy as "one of the few cast members who can act" on Between, the show was not renewed for a third season. It was also announced in 2015 that she would star in the teen comedy Little Bitches alongside Virginia Gardner and Kiersey Clemons.

In August 2016, McCurdy signed a deal with digital production company Canvas Media Studios to develop projects and further utilize her social media connections with fans. She also starred as Claire in the psychological thriller film Pet.

McCurdy expressed on her website that she felt ashamed of 90% of her résumé. She eventually decided to quit acting and to pursue writing and directing in 2017:

"I never got the chance to be cast in a project I was proud to be part of. Now I have a better chance of making things I'm proud of than getting cast in things I'm proud of."

— Jennette McCurdy, The Hollywood Reporter, October 15, 2018

Once a very active user of Twitter, Facebook, Snapchat, and Instagram, McCurdy deleted all her past social media posts and set all her past videos and vlogs to "private" on YouTube and Vimeo.

In 2018, McCurdy wrote and directed her first short film, Kenny, a dramedy inspired by the death of her mother; the film also featured an all-female crew. Kenny was featured in The Hollywood Reporter and on Short of the Week. She has since released three more short films, which she also wrote and directed: The Grave; The McCurdys, a semi-autobiographical short based on her childhood; and Strong Independent Women, a short that deals with eating disorders. In late 2018, McCurdy announced that she hoped to direct more films.

McCurdy revealed on the Empty Inside podcast, during an interview with actress Anna Faris, that she had retired from professional acting. McCurdy stated she had been pushed into acting as a child by her mother, and soon became her family's primary source of income. She became "ashamed" of the roles she had played in the past, and after seeking therapy in the late 2010s, McCurdy decided to quit acting. When iCarly was revived in 2020 for Paramount+, McCurdy declined to reprise her role of Sam Puckett.

=== Music ===
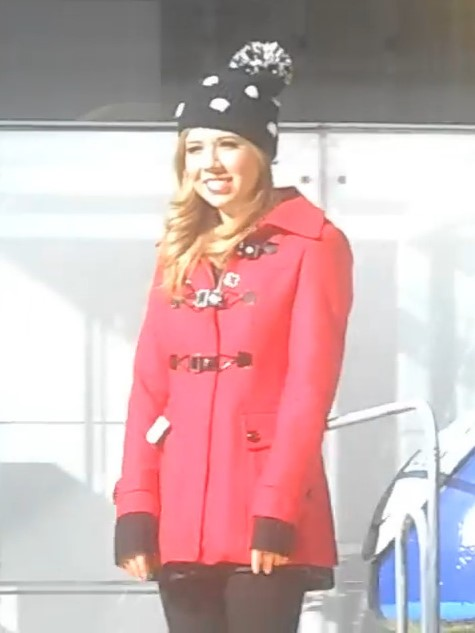
McCurdy on a float at the 2012 Macy's Thanksgiving Day Parade

In June 2008, McCurdy announced that she was working on her debut album. The first single, "So Close", was released on March 10, 2009. On May 19, her cover version of the Amanda Stott song "Homeless Heart" was released. It was released in honor of McCurdy's recently deceased friend Cody Waters, who died at the age of nine from brain cancer, and 20% of the proceeds were donated to the Cody Waters Foundation. She met Waters through St. Jude Children's Research Hospital.

In mid-2009, McCurdy was offered a record deal from both Big Machine Records and Capitol Records Nashville. McCurdy signed to Capitol Nashville. On April 16, 2010, samples of selected songs from McCurdy's upcoming debut country album were released online. The song clips were released for fans to vote for which one they believed should be McCurdy's first radio single. "Not That Far Away" received the most votes, and was released to country radio on May 24, 2010, and iTunes on June 1.

McCurdy's debut EP, Not That Far Away, was released on August 17, 2010. Her second single, "Generation Love", was released as a digital download on March 22, 2011, followed by its release to radio on April 25, 2011. McCurdy released a second EP, Jennette McCurdy, on February 8, 2012 at the clothing retailer Justice. Jennette McCurdy, her debut album, was released on June 5. Shortly after the release, McCurdy confirmed that she had left Capitol Nashville citing conflicts of a new series in which she was cast. In 2022, McCurdy described her music career as "a much-regretted country music blip".

=== Writing ===
In 2011, McCurdy began writing a series of articles for The Wall Street Journal. She has written eight pieces for the paper, on topics ranging from Shirley Temple to body shaming and a corporate culture that she perceives as smoke and mirrors. She has also written for Seventeen magazine and The Huffington Post.

McCurdy composed an article titled "Off-Camera, My Mom's Fight With Cancer", which was published in The Wall Street Journal in June 2011. It describes in detail her mother Debra's illness with cancer, and how her family coped with the situation. The article included advice from McCurdy on living with an ill parent. Her mother died on September 20, 2013, 17 years after being first diagnosed with cancer.

On August 9, 2022, McCurdy released her memoir, I'm Glad My Mom Died, under Simon & Schuster. The book was ranked number one on The New York Times Best Seller list for eight weeks following its release. Following the success of I'm Glad My Mom Died, McCurdy signed a two-book deal with Penguin Random House's Ballantine Books imprint.

On July 1, 2025, it was announced McCurdy would adapt I'm Glad My Mom Died into a television series of the same name, where she also serves as a showrunner with Ari Katcher. It will star Jennifer Aniston.

On January 20, 2026, McCurdy released her debut novel, Half His Age under Ballantine Books.

=== Podcasts and live performance ===
In 2020, McCurdy created and starred in a one-woman tragicomedy show, I'm Glad My Mom Died, in various theaters in Los Angeles and New York. She later had to set her show into hiatus after the onset of the COVID-19 pandemic in the United States. For the first time since she opened up publicly about her eating disorder in 2019, she posted a new video on YouTube where she sings about her personal implications of finding herself in quarantine due to the outbreak. In September 2021, McCurdy resumed performing her tragicomedy show in Los Angeles.

In July 2020, McCurdy posted a video on her YouTube channel and social media where she sings about starting a podcast called Empty Inside that was released later that year.

In September 2023, she began hosting a second podcast entitled Hard Feelings.

== Personal life ==
=== Relationship with her parents ===
McCurdy has described the close relationship she had with her mother as abusive and "the heartbeat of my life". When she was two to three years old, her mother was diagnosed with breast cancer and underwent several surgeries, chemotherapy, and a bone marrow transplant. In 2010, her mother's cancer returned, and in 2013, when McCurdy was 21 years old, her mother died.

McCurdy has revealed that she was emotionally and sexually abused by her mother. In an interview with People magazine, she said, "My mom's emotions were so erratic that it was like walking a tightrope every day." According to McCurdy, her mother pushed her into acting when she was six years old both to financially support her family and because her mother had wanted to become a performer herself. She stated that her mother was "obsessed with making [her] a star" and detailed how her mother contributed to her eating disorder by introducing her to calorie restriction at age 11.

She said that until she was 17 years old, her mother performed invasive vaginal and breast exams on her, ostensibly as medical exams or cancer screenings, and never let her shower alone. McCurdy stated "this was the hardest part of the book for [her] to write about". McCurdy said that she refused to appear in the revival of iCarly because of the reminder of her mother's abuse during the original show, and that she appeared in the spin-off series Sam & Cat to please her mother. McCurdy stated in an interview that she did not receive all of her payment from acting as a minor because her Coogan account was not properly filed.

In her 2022 memoir I'm Glad My Mom Died, the cover of which features McCurdy looking up and holding a pink urn with confetti spilling out, McCurdy further described her mother's abusive and controlling influence.

McCurdy did not learn until after her mother's death that Debra's husband was not her biological father. In her memoir, McCurdy identifies her biological father as being a jazz musician named Andrew. They have met in person at least once.

=== Health problems ===
In March 2019, McCurdy said in a Huffington Post article that from age 11 she had anorexia, and later bulimia. In the article, McCurdy describes the roles of her mother and the entertainment industry in causing and contributing to her eating disorders. She also recounts seeking help after her sister-in-law noticed the disorder, and health scares such as losing a tooth from regurgitating stomach fluids that wore down her tooth enamel and passing out on Miranda Cosgrove's bathroom floor from dehydration. McCurdy described that her eating disorder "robbed me of my joy and any amount of free-spiritedness that I had". By 2022, McCurdy considered herself to be "fully recovered" from eating disorders. McCurdy is also a recovering alcoholic, having begun drinking heavily shortly before her mother's death.

== Filmography ==
=== Film ===
Year	Title	Role	Notes
2001	Golden Dreams	Girl in car	
2001	Shadow Fury	Anna Markov	
2002	My Daughter's Tears	Mary Fields	
2003	Hollywood Homicide	Van Family Daughter	
2003	Taylor Simmons	Amanda Simmons	
2004	Breaking Dawn	Little Girl	
2005	See Anthony Run	Lucy	Short film
2009	Minor Details	Mia	
2011	The Death and Return of Superman	Eradicator Folks	Short film
2013	Snowflake, the White Gorilla	Petunia	Voice role
2014	Almost Heroes 3D	Sue	Voice role
2015	Climate Change Denier's Anthem	Singer	Short film
2016	The Last Virgin in LA	Brittany	Short film
2016	Pet	Claire	
2016	Bling	Sue	Voice role
2017	Security Deposit	Leah	Short film
2017	8 Bodies	TJ	Short film; also director, executive producer, and writer
2017	Wine and Cheese	Jen	Short film; also director, executive producer, and writer
2018	Little Bitches	Annie	
2018	The First Lady	Peggy	Short film

=== Television ===
Year	Title	Role	Notes
2000	Mad TV	Cassidy Gifford	Episode 6.1
2002	CSI: Crime Scene Investigation	Jackie Trent	Episode: "Cats in the Cradle"
2003–2005	Malcolm in the Middle	Daisy	Episode: "If Boys Were Girls"
2003–2005	Malcolm in the Middle	Penelope	Episode: "Buseys Take a Hostage"
2004	Karen Sisco	Josie Boyle	Episode: "No One's Girl"
2004	Strong Medicine	Hailey Campos	Episode: "Selective Breeding"
2004	Tiger Cruise	Kiley Dolan	Television film
2005	Law & Order: Special Victims Unit	Holly Purcell	Episode: "Contagious"
2005	Medium	Sara Crewson	Episode: "Coded"
2005	Judging Amy	Amber Reid	Episode: "My Name is Amy Gray"
2005	The Inside	Madison St. Clair	Episode: "Everything Nice"
2005	Over There	Lynne	Episode: "Situation Normal"
2005	Zoey 101	Trisha Kirby	Episode: "Bad Girl"
2006	Will & Grace	Lisa	Episode: "Von Trapped"
2006	Close to Home	Stacy Johnson	Episode: "Escape"
2006	Against Type	Meredith	Television film
2007	The Last Day of Summer	Dory Sorenson	Television film
2007	Lincoln Heights	Beckie	Recurring role; 3 episodes
2007–2012	iCarly	Sam Puckett	Main role; 93 episodes
2007–2012	iCarly	Melanie Puckett	Episode: "iTwins"
2009–2010	True Jackson, VP	Pinky Turzo	Guest role; 2 episodes
2010	Big Time Rush	Training Fan	Episode: "Big Time Concert"
2010	Fred: The Movie	Bertha	Television film
2010	The Cleveland Show	Girl No. 1	Episode: "Little Man on Campus"; voice role
2010	Glenn Martin, DDS	Mazy	Episode: "Courtney's Pony"; voice role
2010–2015	The Penguins of Madagascar	Becky	Guest role; 2 episodes, voice role
2011	Cupcake Wars	Herself	Guest judge; Episode: "Jennette McCurdy Country Cupcakes"
2011	Best Player	Christina "Prodigy" Saunders	Television film
2011	iParty with Victorious	Sam Puckett	Television film
2012	Victorious	Ponnie / Fawn Liebowitz	Episode: "Crazy Ponnie"
2012	Bucket & Skinner's Epic Adventures	Devon	Episode: "Epic Break-Up"
2012	Camp Orange	Herself	Co-host (season 8)
2013	Ben and Kate	Bethany	Episode: "Gone Fishin'"
2013	Swindle	Savannah Westcott	Television film
2013–2014	Sam & Cat	Sam Puckett	Main role; 35 episodes
2013–2014	Sam & Cat	Melanie Puckett	Episode: "#Twinfection"
2014	The Birthday Boys	Kendra Taylor	Episode: "Love Date Hump"
2015	Comedy Bang! Bang!	Allie Dawson	Episode: "Simon Helberg Wears a Sky Blue Button Down and Jeans"
2015–2016	Between	Wiley Day	Main role; 12 episodes
2016	Robot Chicken	Skipper / Nany / Nurse	Episode: "Joel Hurwitz"; voice role
2016	The Eric Andre Show	Herself	Episode: "Jack Black / Jennette McCurdy"

=== Video games ===
Year	Title	Role	Notes
2009	iCarly	Sam Puckett	Voice role
2010	iCarly 2: iJoin the Click!	Sam Puckett	Voice role

=== Music videos ===
Year	Title	Artist(s)	Role
2000	"The Way You Love Me" (Remix)	Faith Hill	
2003	"Safely Home"	Wild Horses	
2007	"Leave It All to Me"	Miranda Cosgrove (featuring Drake Bell)	Sam Puckett

=== Web ===
Year	Title	Role	Notes
2014	What's Next for Sarah?	Sarah Bronson	Main role; 4 episodes; also creator, executive producer, and writer
2015	Between the Lines: Pretty Lake High – Yearbook Assignment	Wiley Day	Episode: "Wiley"
2016	Adam and Wiley's Lost Weekend	Wiley Day	Main role; 6 episodes

=== Director ===
Year	Title	Notes
2017	The McCurdys	Film; also writer
2018	Kenny	Short film; also writer
2018	The Grave	Short film; also writer
2019	Strong Independent Women	Short film; also writer
TBA	I'm Glad My Mom Died	Television series; also writer

== Discography ==
- Jennette McCurdy (2012)

== Bibliography ==
- I'm Glad My Mom Died (2022)
- Half His Age (2026)

== Podcasts ==
- Empty Inside (2020)
- Hard Feelings (2023)

== Awards and nominations ==
Year	Association	Category	Work	Result	Ref.
2005	Young Artist Awards	Best Performance in a Television Series – Guest Starring Young Actress	Strong Medicine	Nominated	
2008	Young Artist Awards	Best Performance in a TV Movie, Miniseries or Special – Supporting Young Actress	The Last Day of Summer	Nominated	
2008	Young Artist Awards	Best Performance in a TV Series – Supporting Young Actress	iCarly	Nominated	
2009	Young Artist Awards	Best Performance in a TV Series (Comedy or Drama) – Supporting Young Actress	iCarly	Nominated	
2009	Young Artist Awards	Outstanding Young Ensemble in a TV Series	iCarly	Nominated	
2009	Teen Choice Awards	Choice TV Sidekick	iCarly	Nominated	
2010	Young Artist Awards	Outstanding Young Performers in a TV Series	iCarly	Nominated	
2010	Australian Kids' Choice Awards	LOL Award (shared with cast)	iCarly	Won	
2011	Kids' Choice Awards	Favorite TV Sidekick	iCarly	Won	
2011	Teen Choice Awards	Choice TV: Female Scene Stealer	iCarly	Nominated	
2011	Teen Choice Awards	Choice Music: Female Country Artist	Herself	Nominated	
2011	Australian Kids' Choice Awards	LOL Award	iCarly	Won	
2011	Meus Prêmios Nick Brazil	Funniest Character	iCarly	Won	
2012	Kids' Choice Awards	Favorite TV Sidekick	iCarly	Won	
2013	Australian Kids' Choice Awards	Aussie's Fave Nick Star	Herself	Nominated	
2014	Kids' Choice Awards	Favorite TV Actress	Sam & Cat	Nominated	
