= I'm Glad My Mom Died =

2022 memoir by Jennette McCurdy

- Author: Jennette McCurdy
- Audio read by: Jennette McCurdy
- Language: English
- Genre: Memoir
- Publisher: Simon & Schuster
- Publication date: August 9, 2022
- Pages: 320
- ISBN: 978-1-9821-8582-4

I'm Glad My Mom Died is a 2022 memoir by American writer and former actress Jennette McCurdy based on her one-woman show of the same name. The book is about her career as a child actress and her difficult relationship with her abusive mother, who died in 2013. It is McCurdy's first book, and it was published on August 9, 2022, by Simon & Schuster.

The book was featured on the New York Times' best-seller list for paperback nonfiction for over 60 consecutive weeks.

== Summary ==
In the memoir, McCurdy discusses her childhood as a successful child actress, her brief foray into a career in country music, and the troubled and controlling relationship she had with her mother, Debra, who died from cancer in 2013. She describes how her mother forced her into child acting and isolated her as a child and teenager. She describes a strained relationship with a producer at Nickelodeon she referred to only as "The Creator", whom BuzzFeed News and other sources speculated to be Dan Schneider.

The book is divided into two sections, "Before" and "After", which describe the events of her life before and after the death of her mother.

== Background ==
McCurdy had been a professional actress from age six until she announced that she had permanently stopped acting in 2017. From 2009 to 2012, she was signed to Capitol Records Nashville, who released her self-titled debut studio album in 2012.

McCurdy had previously written pieces in publications such as The Wall Street Journal and began writing personal essays shortly after. She sent some of the essays to her manager at the time, who encouraged her to write a book about her experiences. Rather than write a book, McCurdy created a one-woman show titled I'm Glad My Mom Died which she performed in Los Angeles and New York City. Plans to tour the show in other cities were canceled due to the COVID-19 pandemic; she decided to write her material into a memoir.

McCurdy stated that she had rejected $300,000 from Nickelodeon not to talk publicly about her experiences at the network, including actions of a producer at Nickelodeon described pseudonymously as "The Creator" (generally assumed to be Dan Schneider).

=== Book cover ===
The cover features McCurdy looking up and holding a pink urn with decorative paper spilling out. About the decision to use the photo for the book cover, McCurdy told Entertainment Weekly:

Confetti spilling out of an urn felt to me like a good way of capturing the humor in the tragedy, but I knew I didn't want to go as far as throwing the confetti or jumping in the air with a huge smile on my face or doing any other kind of body language / facial expression that could read as flippant. Ultimately I chose a facial expression that I think reads as sincere, a little pained, and a little hopeful.

== Reception ==
The book sold out within 24 hours of going on sale at retailers such as Amazon, Target, and Barnes & Noble. That same month it became a number one New York Times Best Seller for non-fiction in both hardcover and e-book, selling over 200,000 copies across all formats in its first week of release. It also debuted at number one on the Publishers Weekly Bestseller List in the "Hardcover Frontlist Nonfiction" section selling 41,687 units. As of early October 2023, it remained on the hardcover list 60 consecutive weeks. According to Rolling Stone, the book has sold more than three million copies as of July 2025. It was also one of the most borrowed titles in American public libraries during 2023 and 2024.

In a starred review, Publishers Weekly called the book "insightful and incisive, heartbreaking and raw." Kirkus Reviews, which also gave a starred review, wrote that the book is, "The heartbreaking story of an emotionally battered child delivered with captivating candor and grace."

Nina Li Coomes of The Atlantic called it "a layered account of a woman reckoning with love and violence at once." Dave Itzkoff of The New York Times wrote that the memoir was "a coming-of-age story that is alternately harrowing and mordantly funny."

== Accolades ==
Accolades received by "I'm Glad My Mom Died"
Year	Award	Category	Results	Ref.
2022	Goodreads Choice Awards	Best Memoir & Autobiography	Won	

== Release history ==
Release history and formats for I'm Glad My Mom Died
Country	Release date	Edition	Publisher	Ref.
Various	August 9, 2022	Hardback; E-book	Simon & Schuster	
Various	August 9, 2022	Audiobook	Simon & Schuster Audio	
Various	August 9, 2022	CD	Simon & Schuster Audio; Blackstone	

=== Translations ===
- Romanian: Mă bucur că mama a murit. Translated by Lucia Popovici. Iași: Alice Books. 2023. ISBN 978-606-95440-8-2.
- Portuguese: Estou feliz que minha mãe morreu. Translated by Soraya Borges de Freitas. São Paulo: nVerso. November 15, 2022. ISBN 978-65-87638-82-9.
- Polish: Cieszę się, że moja mama umarła. Translated by Magdalena Moltzan-Małkowska. Warsaw: Prószyński i S-ka. January 24, 2023. ISBN 978-83-8295-270-4.
- Dutch: Ik ben blij dat mijn moeder dood is. Translated by De vertaalzusjes. Amsterdam: Spectrum. February 9, 2023. ISBN 978-90-00-38782-3.
- Italian: Sono contenta che mia mamma è morta. Translated by Matteo Curtoni and Maura Parolini. Milan: Mondadori. March 14, 2023. ISBN 978-88-04-77320-7.
- Swedish: Jag är glad att mamma dog. Translated by Julia Gillberg. Stockholm: Bookmark Förlag. April 3, 2023. ISBN 978-91-89750-42-5.
- Danish: Jeg er glad for min mor døde. Translated by Christa Leve Poulsen. People's. June 9, 2023. ISBN 978-87-7593-301-3.
- German: I'm Glad My Mom Died: Meine Befreiung aus einer toxischen Mutter-Tochter-Beziehung. Translated by Sylvia Bieker and Henriette Zeltner-Shane. Frankfurt a.M.: Fischer Taschenbuch. May 24, 2023. ISBN 978-3-596-70888-8.
- Finnish: Onneksi äitini kuoli. Translated by Saara Pääkkönen. Helsinki: Johnny Kniga. August 10, 2023. ISBN 978-951-0-49602-2.
- Lithuanian: Džiaugiuosi, kad mirė mano mama. Translated by Daiva Krištopaitienė. Vilnius: Alma littera. August 24, 2023. ISBN 978-609-01-5655-1.
- Norwegian: Jeg er glad mamma døde. Translated by Kjersti Velsand. Oslo: Kagge Forlag. August 30, 2023. ISBN 978-82-489-3365-6.
- Slovak: Som rada, že mama zomrela. Translated by Sára Moyzesová. Bratislava: IKAR. September 19, 2023. ISBN 978-80-551-9043-3.
- Bulgarian: Радвам се, че мама умря. Translated by Elena Kodinova. Sofia: Helikon. February 2, 2024. ISBN 978-619-251-142-5.
- French: Génial, ma mère est morte !. Translated by Corinne Daniellot. February 7, 2024. ISBN 978-2-7096-7198-9.
- Croatian: Drago mi je da je Mama mrtva. Translated by Hana Samardžija. Zaprešić: Fraktura. February 2024. ISBN 978-953-358-662-5.
- Hungarian: Örülök, hogy meghalt az anyám. Translated by Kata Rácz. Szeged: Könyvmolyképző. April 30, 2024. ISBN 978-963-597-680-5
- Japanese: ママが死んでよかった, romanized: Mama ga shinde yokatta. Translated by Riko Murai. Tokyo: Tokuma Shoten. June 14, 2024. ISBN 978-4-19-865829-8.
- Vietnamese: Lòng Tôi Nhẹ Khi Mẹ Rời Xa. Translated by Rô. First News. June 22, 2024. ISBN 978-604-40-2641-1.
- Latvian: Priecājos, ka mana mamma nomira. Translated by Kristīne Spure. Rīga: Helios. July 29, 2024. ISBN 978-9934-63-906-7.
- Serbian: Drago mi je što je moja mama umrla. Translated by Branka Stamenković. Belgrade: Vulkan izdavaštvo. April 2025. ISBN 978-86-10-05489-7.

== Television adaptation ==
In July 2025, Apple TV+ greenlit a series order of ten episodes, starring Jennifer Aniston, who also serves as an executive producer. It is inspired by McCurdy's memoir of the same name about "the codependent relationship between an 18-year-old actress in a hit kids' show, and her narcissistic mom who relishes in her identity as a starlet's mother," with Aniston in the mother role.

The series is created by McCurdy and Ari Katcher, who also serve as co-showrunners and executive producers alongside Sharon Horgan, Stacy Greenberg, Dani Gorin, Tom Ackerley, Josey McNamara, Jerrod Carmichael, Erica Kay, and Jennifer Aniston. Filmmaker Jason Reitman was also involved in the series as its director but eventually exited the project, reportedly due to a tense clash with McCurdy. According to reports, Reitman had pushed for a more comedic tone than the author wanted, creating a "spat" that ended up being "disrespectful" to Reitman. In addition, it was announced in July 2026 that Aniston will also be leaving the project due to "scheduling conflicts".

== See also ==
- Mommie Dearest (1978) – a memoir written by Christina Crawford about her strained relationship with her adoptive mother Joan Crawford.
- Quiet on Set: The Dark Side of Kids TV (2024) – a documentary television series about Dan Schneider's tenure on Nickelodeon, featuring testimonials from former actors and crewmembers.
