= Where I Belong (Rachel Proctor song) =

Single by Rachel Proctor

from the album Where I Belong
- Released: September 25, 2004
- Genre: Country
- Length: 3:52
- Label: BNA
- Songwriter(s): Troy Verges; Aimee Mayo; Chris Lindsey; Hillary Lindsey
- Producer(s): Chris Lindsey

Rachel Proctor singles chronology
"Me and Emily" (2004)	"Where I Belong" (2004)

"Where I Belong" is a song recorded by American country music artist Rachel Proctor. It was released in September 2004 as the fourth single and title track from the album Where I Belong. The song reached #37 on the Billboard Hot Country Singles & Tracks chart. The song was written by Troy Verges, Aimee Mayo, Chris Lindsey and Hillary Lindsey.

== Chart performance ==
Chart (2004)	Peak position
US Hot Country Songs (Billboard)	37
