= Where I Belong (Rachel Proctor album) =

Studio album by Rachel Proctor
- Released: August 10, 2004
- Genre: Country
- Label: BNA
- Producer: Chris Lindsey

Rachel Proctor chronology
| Where I Belong (2004) | Only Lonely Girl (2007) |

Professional ratings
Review scores
| Source | Rating |
|---|---|
| Allmusic | 3/5 stars |

Where I Belong is the debut studio album by American country music artist Rachel Proctor. It was released on BNA Records in 2004 as her only studio album to date. Four singles were released from this album between 2003 and 2004: "Days Like This", "Didn't I", "Me and Emily", and the title track. "Me and Emily" was the highest-charting of these four, reaching No. 18 on the Billboard country chart.

== Track listing ==
| No. | Title | Writer(s) | Length |
|---|---|---|---|
| 1. | "Days Like This" | Rachel Proctor, Odie Blackmon | 3:08 |
| 2. | "Me and Emily" | Proctor, Chris Tompkins | 3:41 |
| 3. | "I'm Gonna Get You Back" | Proctor, Jeremy Stover | 2:48 |
| 4. | "Strong as an Oak" | Proctor, Philip White | 3:36 |
| 5. | "Shame on Me" | Jim Collins, Christi Dannemiller | 3:31 |
| 6. | "If That Chair Could Talk" | Mark Narmore, Liz Rose | 4:20 |
| 7. | "If You're Gonna Leave Me (Leave Me Alone)" | Proctor, P. White, Michael Mobley | 3:56 |
| 8. | "Didn't I" | Kris Bergsnes, Brian Nash, Mike Post | 3:28 |
| 9. | "So Close" | Lee Thomas Miller, Michael White) | 4:31 |
| 10. | "We Did It Our Way" | Proctor, Stover | 3:37 |
| 11. | "Where I Belong" | Chris Lindsey, Hillary Lindsey, Aimee Mayo, Troy Verges | 3:52 |

== Personnel ==
- Tim Akers- keyboards, piano
- Tom Bukovac- electric guitar
- J.T. Corenflos- electric guitar
- Eric Darken- percussion
- Larry Franklin- fiddle
- Paul Franklin- steel guitar
- Kenny Greenburg- electric guitar
- Aubrey Haynie- fiddle
- Wes Hightower- background vocals
- Troy Lancaster- electric guitar
- Hillary Lindsey- background vocals
- Brent Mason- electric guitar
- Kim Parent- background vocals
- Rachel Proctor- lead vocals
- Karyn Rochelle- background vocals
- Jason Sellers- background vocals
- Jimmie Lee Sloas- bass guitar
- Biff Watson- acoustic guitar
- Lonnie Wilson- drums
- Glenn Worf- bass guitar
- Darryl Worley- background vocals
- Jonathan Yudkin- fiddle

== Charts ==
| Chart (2004) | Peak position |
|---|---|
| U.S. Billboard 200 | 66 |
| U.S. Billboard Top Country Albums | 8 |
