= Not That Far Away (EP) =

EP by Jennette McCurdy
- Released: August 17, 2010
- Recorded: 2010
- Studio: Warner Studios; (Nashville, Tennessee)
- Genre: Country; country pop
- Length: 16:29
- Label: Capitol Nashville
- Producer: Paul Worley

Jennette McCurdy chronology
| Not That Far Away (2010) | Jennette McCurdy (2012) |

Singles from Not That Far Away
- 1. "Not That Far Away" Released: May 24, 2010

Not That Far Away is the debut extended play and major label debut by American former singer Jennette McCurdy, released on August 17, 2010, by Capitol Records Nashville. Produced by Paul Worely, McCurdy co-wrote three of the four songs on the EP along with the iTunes bonus track.

One single of the same name was released, which peaked at number 58 on the Billboard Hot Country Songs chart for the week of July 10, 2010. Following the release of McCurdy's debut studio album in 2012, the EP was removed from digital stores. Certain tracks from Not That Far Away were included on her debut studio album.

== Background ==
In 2008, McCurdy announced on her website that she was working on her debut album. Her debut single "So Close" was released independently in March 2009. McCurdy released a second single, "Homeless Heart" in May 2009 in tribute to Cody Waters. Her debut single caught the attention of many record labels after it charted to number 16 on the iTunes country chart. McCurdy's debut album was planned to be independently released in June 2009, instead she announced she signed with Capitol Records Nashville.

Fans were able to pick McCurdy's debut single in an online poll that featured samples of six songs from her upcoming record; "Not That Far Away," with 30% of the total votes, was selected for release.

Originally titled The Story of My Life and planned to be her full-length debut studio album, Capitol Nashville instead decided on releasing an extended play titled after the lead single.

Despite not being released as a single, the track "Stronger" was featured on the compilation album Now That's What I Call Music! 35.

== Release and promotion ==
Not That Far Away was released digitally on August 17, 2010. To promote the EP, McCurdy embarked on a radio tour, performing at various country radio stations.

== Track listing ==
| No. | Title | Writer(s) | Length |
|---|---|---|---|
| 1. | "Not That Far Away" | Blair Daly; Rachel Proctor; Jennette McCurdy | 3:24 |
| 2. | "Stronger" | Daly; Proctor; McCurdy | 3:28 |
| 3. | "Break Your Heart" | Wendell Mobley; Jennifer Schott; Mallary Hope | 3:25 |
| 4. | "Put Your Arms Around Someone" | McCurdy; Jessi Alexander; Luke Laird | 3:11 |

iTunes Store bonus track
| No. | Title | Writer(s) | Length |
|---|---|---|---|
| 5. | "Me with You" | Ben Glover; Kyle Jacobs; McCurdy | 3:01 |

== Chart performance ==
Not That Far Away debuted and peaked at number 32 on the U.S. Billboard Top Country Albums chart and number 3 on the Heatseekers Albums chart.

| Chart (2010) | Peak position |
|---|---|
| US Top Country Albums (Billboard) | 32 |
| US Heatseekers Albums (Billboard) | 3 |
| US Current Album Sales (Billboard) | 174 |

== Release history ==
Release dates and formats for Not That Far Away
| Region | Date | Format(s) | Label |
|---|---|---|---|
| United States | August 17, 2010 | Digital download; streaming | Capitol Nashville |
