= Me and Emily =

Single by Rachel Proctor

from the album Where I Belong
- Released: March 2004
- Genre: Country
- Length: 3:42
- Label: BNA
- Songwriter: Rachel Proctor; Chris Tompkins
- Producer: Chris Lindsey

Rachel Proctor singles chronology
"Didn't I" (2004)	"Me and Emily" (2004)	"Where I Belong" (2004)

"Me and Emily" is a song co-written and recorded by American country music singer Rachel Proctor. It was released in March 2004 as the third single from her album Where I Belong. Proctor wrote this song with Chris Tompkins.

== Content ==
The song is about a female who drives away from an abusive relationship, taking her daughter with her. It is in E-flat major, with a main chord pattern of A♭_{sus}2-B♭_{sus}-Cm7-B♭_{sus}. It is primarily accompanied by piano and guitars set to E-flat tuning.

Proctor told Country Weekly that the idea came about during a songwriting session with Chris Tompkins. She had not written a song in eight months, and "wanted a day off", but Tompkins suggested a line about "stuff scattered in the floorboard of a car." After Proctor told him that "Everybody has a driving song", he suggested that they take the story in a different direction, when Proctor came up with the phrase "me and Emily". Although neither of them had experienced domestic abuse, Proctor had been told by fans that it convinced them to leave their own abusive relationships. BNA Records executives insisted that Proctor cut the song, and held the release of her debut album Where I Belong until the song was released as its third single.

== Critical reception ==
Thom Jurek of Allmusic compared the song's intro to "Walking in Memphis" by Marc Cohn, and said that it "shows Proctor's mettle as a lyricist[…]the conviction in the grain of her voice brings to bear all the weight placed on the protagonists' decision. It's tough, believable, and full of brittle truth and that glimmer of hope that makes country songs of any stripe special."

== Chart performance ==
"Me and Emily" debuted at number 59 on the Hot Country Songs dated March 13, 2004. It charted for 22 weeks and peaked at number 18.

Chart (2004)	Peak position
US Billboard Bubbling Under Hot 100 Singles	10
US Hot Country Songs (Billboard)	18
