= Bessel van der Kolk =

Dutch psychiatrist, researcher and educator (born 1943)

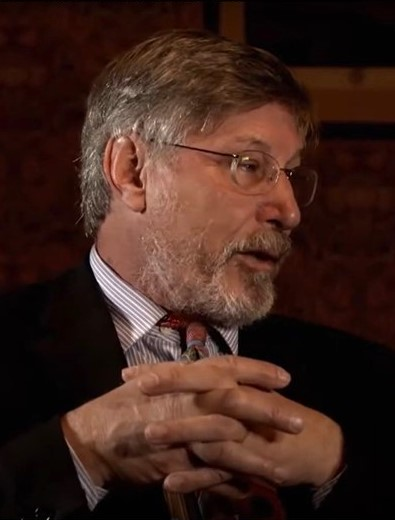
- Van der Kolk (2022)
- Born: July 8, 1943 (age 83); The Hague, Netherlands
- Education: University of Hawaiʻi at Mānoa (B.A., 1965); University of Chicago (M.D., 1970)
- Known for: Post-traumatic stress disorder research
- Scientific career
- Workplaces: Boston University School of Medicine; Boston State Hospital
- Website: www.besselvanderkolk.com

Bessel van der Kolk (Dutch: [vɑn dɛr kɔlk]; born 8 July 1943) is a Boston-based Dutch-American psychiatrist, author, researcher and educator. Since the 1970s his research has been in the area of post-traumatic stress. He is the author of four books, including The New York Times best seller The Body Keeps the Score, which was translated into 43 languages. Scientists have criticized the book for promoting pseudoscientific claims about trauma, memory, the brain, and development.

Van der Kolk served as president of the International Society for Traumatic Stress Studies and is a former co-director of the National Child Traumatic Stress Network. He is a professor of psychiatry at Boston University School of Medicine and president of the Trauma Research Foundation in Brookline, Massachusetts.

== Early life and education ==
Van der Kolk was born in the Netherlands in July 1943. The Hague was occupied by the Nazis at the time and his father was sent to a work-camp. He was the middle child of five. His mother taught her children to play musical instruments. Bessel played piano and cello and was taught six languages.

He studied a pre-medical curriculum with a political science major (B.A.) at the University of Hawaiʻi at Mānoa in 1965. As an undergraduate, he was active in Students for a Democratic Society and was influenced by R. D. Laing and other thinkers in the anti-psychiatry movement. He received his M.D. at the Pritzker School of Medicine, University of Chicago, in 1970, and completed his psychiatric residency at the Massachusetts Mental Health Center, Harvard Medical School, in 1974.

== Career ==
After his training, van der Kolk worked as a director of Boston State Hospital. He became a staff psychiatrist at the Boston Veterans Administration Outpatient Clinic. Van der Kolk developed an interest in studying traumatic stress in 1978 while working with Vietnam war veterans suffering from PTSD and serving on the Harvard Medical School faculty. He was a member of the PTSD committee of the 1980 and 1994 editions of the Diagnostic and Statistical Manual of Mental Disorders and conducted the first studies on the use of fluoxetine and sertraline in the treatment of PTSD.

In 1982, van der Kolk started the Trauma Center in Brookline, Massachusetts while he was working as a junior faculty member at Harvard Medical School. Since then, he has conducted numerous training programs and clinical trials. Van der Kolk has conducted extensive studies on the nature of traumatic memory and took a leading role in the first studies on the psychopharmacological treatments of PTSD. He conducted some of the earliest studies on the biological substrates of PTSD and on stress-induced analgesia. Involved in the first neuroimaging studies of PTSD and dissociative identity disorder, van der Kolk received the first grants from the National Institutes of Health to study EMDR and yoga.

In the early 1990s, van der Kolk was a proponent of recovered memory therapy, and was an expert witness in criminal trials to the effect.

In 1999, van der Kolk initiated the creation of the National Child Traumatic Stress Network. By 2019, it had grown to a network of 150 sites specializing in treating traumatized children and their families around the US. In that context he and his colleagues studied more than 20,000 traumatized children and adolescents to formulate Developmental Trauma Disorder, a new trauma disorder not yet been accepted within the DSM. He has systematically studied innovative treatments for traumatic stress in children and adults, such as trauma-sensitive yoga, theater, embodied therapies, neurofeedback, and psychedelic therapies.

In January 2018, he was dismissed as medical director of the Trauma Center, operated by the Justice Resource Institute, following allegations that he had mistreated colleagues, which he denied. He later established a new foundation.

Van der Kolk was named in Time's 2024 list of influential people in health.

== Writings and views ==
Van der Kolk has a particular interest in developmental psychopathology and the study of how trauma has a differential effect, depending on developmental stage and the security of the attachment system.

Van der Kolk's book, The Body Keeps the Score, was published in 2014. It focuses on the central role of the attachment system and social environment to protect against developing trauma-related disorders, and explores a large variety of interventions to recover from the impact of traumatic experiences. Van der Kolk coined the term "Developmental Trauma Disorder" for the complex range of psychological and biological reactions to trauma over the course of human development, also known as Complex Post-Traumatic Stress Disorder (CPTSD). In 2014, Van der Kolk stated he is against both exposure therapy and cognitive behavioural therapy, claiming the former was one of the "worst possible treatments" — a fringe belief.

The book was well received by the general public. As of February 2025, The Body Keeps the Score had spent more than 328 weeks on The New York Times best seller list, and 212 weeks (over 4 years) in the United States on Amazon’s bestseller list. It has been translated into 43 languages. However, scientists and clinicians have criticized the book for promoting pseudoscientific claims, and blaming van der Kolk and others for popularising ineffective therapies for trauma over evidence-based therapies.

Kristen Martin of The Washington Post criticized van der Kolk for promoting "uncertain science", such as mirror neurons, the polyvagal theory, and the triune brain model. A 2023 editorial published in Research on Social Work Practice criticized the book for promoting treatments that have limited to no evidence. It states that van der Kolk and Levine "regularly ignore, misrepresent, and sometimes veer into or close to pseudoscience when it comes to the scientific knowledge base of PTSD treatment". Similarly, Peter Barglow, writing for the Skeptical Inquirer, criticized him for endorsing controversial treatments, including EMDR and emotional freedom technique.

In his 2005 Canadian Journal of Psychiatry article psychologist Richard McNally described the reasoning of van der Kolk's 1994 article "The Body Keeps the Score" as "mistaken", and his theory as "plague[d]" by "[c]onceptual and empirical problems." McNally describes "recovered memory therapy," inspired by van der Kolk's approach, as "arguably the most serious catastrophe to strike the mental health field since the lobotomy era". McNally's 2003 book Remembering Trauma gave a detailed critique (pp. 177-82) of van der Kolk's article, concluding van der Kolk's theory was one "in search of a phenomenon".

In a 2024 Mother Jones article, author and journalist Emi Nietfeld criticized the book, claiming the book "stigmatizes survivors, blames victims, and depoliticizes violence." She reached out to multiple researchers of the original research the book cites for comments, and reported multiple researchers said The Body Keeps the Score distorted their research. The evidence the book presents regarding how trauma is "remembered" by the body is also weak. She also illustrates the book lacks considerations for broader social and political factors of violence and trauma.

== Personal life ==
As of 2024, van der Kolk was married to his second wife, living in rural Massachusetts and still seeing patients.

== Works ==
- Van der Kolk, B. A., ed. Post-traumatic Stress Disorder: Psychological and Biological Sequelae. Washington DC: American Psychiatric, 1984. ISBN 978-0880480536
- Van der Kolk, B. A., Psychological Trauma. Washington DC: American Psychiatric, 1987. ISBN 978-1585621620
- Van der Kolk, B. A., McFarlane, Alexander C., Weisæth, L. (eds). Traumatic Stress: The Effects of Overwhelming Experience on Mind, Body and Society. New York: Guilford, 1996. ISBN 978-1572304574
- Van der Kolk, B. A. The Body Keeps the Score: Brain, Mind, and Body in the Healing of Trauma. Viking, 2014. ISBN 9780670785933.
