= The Body Keeps the Score =

2014 book by Bessel van der Kolk

- Cover featuring Henri Matisse's Icarus
- Author: Bessel van der Kolk
- Original title: The Body Keeps the Score: Brain, Mind, and Body in the Healing of Trauma
- Publisher: Viking Press
- Publication date: September 25, 2014
- Pages: 464
- ISBN: 978-0-670-78593-3
- OCLC: 861478952
- Dewey Decimal: 616.85/21206
- LC Class: RC552.P67 V358 2014

The Body Keeps the Score: Brain, Mind, and Body in the Healing of Trauma is a 2014 book by Bessel van der Kolk about the purported effects of psychological trauma. The book describes van der Kolk's research and experiences on how people are affected by traumatic stress, including its effects on the mind and body.

The book was a bestseller for many years and has been published in 36 languages. It has been criticized for misrepresenting conclusions, citing research that doesn't actually support the claims made, using outmoded research, having poor scholarly standards, and coming close to or crossing into pseudoscience. The book also discourages readers from pursuing well supported evidence-based treatments such as cognitive behavioural therapy (CBT).

== Publication history ==
The book is based on van der Kolk's 1994 Harvard Review of Psychiatry article "The body keeps the score: memory and the evolving psychobiology of posttraumatic stress". The article was criticized by psychologist Richard McNally for its reliance on implicit memory and lacking evidence for some of its claims, and McNally offered a detailed critique in his 2003 book Remembering Trauma (pp. 177–82), concluding van der Kolk's theory was one "in search of a phenomenon".

== Overview ==
In the book, van der Kolk focuses on the central role of the attachment system and social environment in protecting against developing trauma-related disorders. Where trauma does occur, he discusses the effects and possible forms of healing, including a large variety of interventions to recover from the impacts of traumatic experiences. These include EMDR (eye movement desensitization and reprocessing), yoga, and limbic system therapy.

== Reception ==
After its publication in 2014, The Body Keeps the Score became one of the most prominent popular science books of its time, remaining a best-seller for years after its release and gaining wide readership among clinicians and the general public. It received a starred review from Library Journal. Reviewing the book for New Scientist magazine, Shaoni Bhattacharya wrote that "[p]acked with science and human stories, the book is an intense read that can get technical. Stay with it, though: van der Kolk has a lot to say, and the struggle and resilience of his patients is very moving." A 2024 article in The Financial Times wrote that the book "has become an improbable sensation. Buoyed by a groundswell of popular interest in trauma and psychology in the wake of the pandemic, the dense, scientifically rigorous text has become a latent, runaway success, spending nearly 300 weeks on The New York Times bestseller list."

The book received a negative review in The Washington Post in 2023 for promoting "uncertain science". A 2023 editorial published in Research on Social Work Practice criticized the book for promoting treatments that have limited to no evidence. It states that van der Kolk and Levine "regularly ignore, misrepresent, and sometimes veer into or close to pseudoscience when it comes to the scientific knowledge base of PTSD treatment". In a 2024 Mother Jones article, Emi Nietfeld, an award winning author and survivor of sexual assault, criticized the book, writing it "stigmatizes survivors, blames victims, and depoliticizes violence." She reached out to the cited researchers, with multiple reporting that he disregarded, misinterpreted or misreported their findings. The evidence the book presents regarding how trauma is "remembered" by the body is also weak. She also illustrates the book lacks considerations for broader social and political factors of violence and trauma. A 2025 review in BJPsych Bulletin evaluated the evidence of 122 claims in the book and concluded that while the book tapped into deep interest regarding trauma—and subsequently shaped patient and clinician expectations—its claims about "trauma-induced brain damage and the unique efficacy of body-based treatments" were not supported by current research.
