= Days Like This (Radio Ulster) =

Days Like This was a dedicated year long radio initiative broadcast on BBC Radio Ulster. The programme featured human interest stories of significant days in the life of listeners. It aired each weekday morning at 11:55 am. The series producer was Pauline Currie.
