= Close to Home (2005 TV series) =

American television series

- Genre: Crime drama; Legal drama
- Created by: Jim Leonard
- Starring: Jennifer Finnigan; Kimberly Elise; Christian Kane; John Carroll Lynch; David James Elliott; Cress Williams; Jon Seda
- Composer: Michael A. Levine
- Country of origin: United States
- Original language: English
- No. of seasons: 2
- No. of episodes: 44 (list of episodes)

Production
- Executive producers: Jonathan Littman; Eric Ellis Overmyer; Jerry Bruckheimer; Jim Leonard; Simon West
- Producers: Jill Danton; Tom Smuts; Antoinette Stella; Kevin Dowling; Elwood Reid; Matt Earl Beesley; Jennifer Finnigan
- Running time: 60 minutes
- Production companies: Jerry Bruckheimer Television; Hoosier Karma; Warner Bros. Television

Original release
- Network: CBS
- Release: October 4, 2005 – May 11, 2007

Close to Home is an American crime and legal drama television series co-produced by Warner Bros. Television and Jerry Bruckheimer Television for CBS. While in pre-production the series was known as American Crime. It aired from October 4, 2005, to May 11, 2007, and starred actress Jennifer Finnigan as Annabeth Chase, a Deputy Prosecutor for Marion County, Indiana (which contains Indianapolis). Created by Jim Leonard, the series was primarily filmed in Southern California. The score composer was Michael A. Levine.

On May 16, 2007, CBS canceled the series after two seasons.

== Plot ==
Annabeth Chase is a criminal prosecutor with a near perfect conviction record. Throughout the series, she lost only three cases. In Season 1, Episode 21 "David and Goliath", Chase tried a case against a professional baseball player, who killed his pregnant girlfriend. His not guilty verdict was attributed to his fame. Chase lost the case of a man prosecuted for a rape he committed 11 years prior, in Season 2, Episode 18, "Making Amends." In this case the victim was unable to recall the assault, as she unknowingly ingested Rohypnol, known as "The Date Rape Drug", which causes amnesia. In Season 2, Episode 21, "Drink the Cup", Chase was unable to convict a corrupt cop named Veeder of the murder of a fellow police officer. In the following episode she successfully tried Veeder for the murder of a young girl he exploited.

She is married to a construction worker, Jack Chase (Christian Kane), and has an infant daughter, Hailey Chase. The show revolves around her balancing her career and family life, as a prosecutor in the city of Indianapolis.

=== First season ===
In the pilot episode, Chase returns from a 12-week maternity leave to find herself with a new boss, Maureen Scofield (Kimberly Elise), who has been promoted instead of her. Maureen is a no-nonsense, workaholic woman who admires Chase's dedication to her family and her personal life. Above her is County Prosecutor Steve Sharpe (John Carroll Lynch). Chase wins the first case she prosecutes upon her return to work: an abusive husband who is sentenced to 25 years in prison without parole.

=== Second season ===
Chase returns to work four months after her husband was killed by a drunk driver in the first-season finale. Chase's coming to terms with her husband's death, her grief, and her struggle to return to normalcy, coupled with the guilt and trials of being a single parent, are recurring themes throughout the season.

Chase and Maureen also face a new boss, Chief Deputy Prosecutor James Conlon (David James Elliott), who has just arrived from New York, and whose methods appear to the two prosecutors to be too forceful and sometimes unethical.

Near the end of the season, Conlon attempts an attorney general campaign which is derailed as police corruption is discovered, resulting in several prosecutions. Scofield is assassinated as a result of these prosecutions. The season ends with Chase successfully prosecuting Scofield's assassin.

== Episodes ==
| Season | Episodes | Originally released | |
| Season | Episodes | First released | Last released |
|---|---|---|---|
| 1 | 22 | October 4, 2005 | May 19, 2006 |
| 2 | 22 | September 22, 2006 | May 11, 2007 |

== Cast ==
- Jennifer Finnigan as Annabeth Chase
- Kimberly Elise as Maureen Scofield
- Christian Kane as Jack Chase (season 1)
- John Carroll Lynch as Steve Sharpe (season 1)
- Jon Seda as Ray Blackwell (season 2)
- Cress Williams as Detective Ed Williams (season 2)
- David James Elliott as James Conlon (season 2)
- Jessica Chastain as Casey Wirth
- Bruce Davison as Defense Attorney Doug Hellman
- Barry Shabaka Henley as Detective Lou Drummer
- Scott Caudill as Michael Hale (season 1)
- McKinley Freeman as William Harding (season 1)

== U.S. Nielsen Ratings ==
| Season | Episodes | Premiere | Finale | Viewers (million) | Rank | 18–49 demographic |
|---|---|---|---|---|---|---|
| Season 1 | 22 | October 4, 2005 | May 19, 2006 | 10.41 | #45 | 2.8/8 |
| Season 2 | 22 | September 22, 2006 | May 11, 2007 | 10.30 | #41 | 2.5/8 |

Despite earning high ratings for what is perceived as the Friday night death slot and ranking higher than most of its competition in the same slot, the show was still cancelled after only 2 seasons.
