= Days Like This (Rachel Proctor song) =

Single by Rachel Proctor

from the album Where I Belong
- Released: May 17, 2003
- Genre: Country
- Length: 3:08
- Label: BNA
- Songwriter(s): Rachel Proctor, Odie Blackmon
- Producer(s): Chris Lindsey

Rachel Proctor singles chronology
"Days Like This" (2003)	"Didn't I" (2003)

"Days Like This" is a debut song co-written and recorded American country music artist Rachel Proctor. It was released in May 2003 as the first single from the album Where I Belong. The song reached No. 24 on the Billboard Hot Country Singles & Tracks chart. The song was written by Proctor and Odie Blackmon.

== Chart performance ==
Chart (2003)	Peak position
US Hot Country Songs (Billboard)	24
