= List of Close to Home (2005 TV series) episodes =

This is the list of episodes for the CBS crime drama television series Close to Home. The series was first shown on October 4, 2005, and was broadcast for two seasons before being cancelled on May 16, 2007. The series follows Annabeth Chase, a deputy prosecutor in Marion County, Indiana, as she balances work with being a new mother.

== Series overview ==
Season	Episodes	Originally released	
Season	Episodes	First released	Last released
1	22	October 4, 2005	May 19, 2006
2	22	September 22, 2006	May 11, 2007

== Episodes ==
=== Season 1 (2005–06) ===
Season one consisted of 22 episodes and was broadcast between October 2005 and May 2006. After the fifth episode, "Romeo and Juliet Murders", CBS moved Close to Home from Tuesday 10pm to Friday 9pm, commonly called the Friday night death slot. When the show garnered its highest ratings to that point CBS announced that Close to Home would remain on Fridays.

No. overall	No. in season	Title	Directed by	Written by	Original release date	Prod. code	US viewers (millions)
1	1	"Pilot"	Simon West	Jim Leonard	October 4, 2005	475284	10.43
After the birth of her baby, Annabeth Chase returns to work and a case where a woman set her house on fire with her children inside of it. The women claims that her husband has abused both her and her children for many years and kept them locked in the house, and committed the arson to escape.
2	2	"Miranda"	Karen Gaviola	Lukas Reiter	October 11, 2005	2T6704	10.1
Annabeth takes a risk to force a confession from a kidnapping suspect to find his victim alive. She then has to find evidence not linked to the confession to convict the kidnapper.
3	3	"Suburban Prostitution"	Steven DePaul	Lindsey Sturman	October 18, 2005	2T6703	9.9
Annabeth investigates an alleged prostitution ring among desperate suburban housewives and finds more than she anticipated. Maureen is tasked with increasing the number of convictions for drug offences and struggles with a case in which a junkie with a long criminal record is supposed to be a sophisticated dealer who deserves more serious charges.
4	4	"Divine Directions"	Helen Shaver	Leo Geter	October 25, 2005	2T6705	9.2
Annabeth prosecutes a case against a very religious woman who is accused of stabbing her husband to death in the name of God.
5	5	"Romeo and Juliet Murders"	Lewis H. Gould	Jim Leonard	November 1, 2005	2T6706	9.5
When a house party becomes too disruptive and the police come to end the party they discover small quantities of narcotics. Despite pleading that it is their father's pharmaceutical sales samples, the two siblings hosting the party are arrested. Attempts to contact their parents, whom they claim are vacationing in Europe, prove futile. The siblings' stories unravel more when the bodies of their parents are found. Annabeth soon believes the kids are involved with the murders after their stories keep changing. This episode was inspired by the case of Lyle and Erik Menendez.
6	6	"Parents on Trial"	Charles Beeson	Erica Shelton	November 11, 2005	2T6708	11.87
Annabeth prosecutes a scorned women in the case of the murder of a 6-year-old. She also tries to stop the defense from bringing the child's parents' relationship with the murderer into evidence. This episode was inspired by the Killing of JonBenét Ramsey.
7	7	"Double Life Wife"	Alex Zakrzewski	John E. Pogue	November 18, 2005	2T6707	11.64
Annabeth investigates a woman's murder in a shopping mall parking lot. When the husband turns in his other wife for the murder, his web of lies and wives begins to be exposed.
8	8	"Under Threat"	Martha Mitchell	Lukas Reiter	November 25, 2005	2T6709	11.96
Annabeth prosecutes a gangster who has his gang attempt to murder a witness and threatens her daughter during the case.
9	9	"Meth Murders"	Kevin Dowling	Leo Geter & Lindsay Jewett Sturman	December 9, 2005	2T6710	12.80
Annabeth prosecutes a man who was hired to kill two people. However, while high on meth, he murdered the people in the house on the wrong side of the street. After the accused said that he would turn in one of the biggest drug lords in the state for a lighter sentence, the team tries to find the drug lord without his testimony in order to fully convict the murderer and capture the drug lord.
10	10	"Baseball Murder"	Emilio Estevez	Christopher Ambrose	December 16, 2005	2T6702	11.34
A 13-year-old murders another teenager in a minor league baseball game. Annabeth believes that he was encouraged by his coach to hit the victim in the head with a baseball bat.
11	11	"The Good Doctor"	Lewis H. Gould	Jim Leonard & Erica Shelton	January 6, 2006	2T6712	11.47
Annabeth prosecutes the case of the murder of a doctor's wife who had planned to sue her husband. The team later believes that the doctor murdered his wife and self inflicted his wounds in order to frame another man.
12	12	"Privilege"	Roxann Dawson	Carol Barbee	January 13, 2006	2T6711	11.20
Annabeth prosecutes a man accused of kidnapping a successful African American man and murdering another. After his lawyer learns of other crimes, he is reluctant to help, even if it would save the man. Annabeth tries to convince the killer's lawyer to resign from the case to testify against him.
13	13	"The Rapist Next Door"	Martha Mitchell	Carol Barbee	January 27, 2006	2T6701	10.74
Posters are put up that a convicted rapist named Brian Ford, who is now on parole, is now living in Annabeth's neighborhood. When a woman is raped using a knife, Ford is the main suspect. Despite video evidence showing he has an alibi, the neighborhood erupts in vigilante justice against Ford. After new evidence is found and the rapist is apprehended, one of the neighbors, Don Wheeler, tries to kill Ford, knowing Ford was in prison at the time, as revenge for the rape and murder of his own daughter.
14	14	"Dead or Alive"	John Peters	John E. Pogue	February 3, 2006	2T6713	12.13
A disturbed man is accused of killing his neighbor after a heated argument. He then later confesses to murdering two other people who have been missing for a long period of time. After one of those people is discovered to still be alive, the defense tries to exclude the confessions from the case after getting most of the physical evidence excluded. Annabeth must convince the accused's mother to testify against him.
15	15	"Reasonable Doubts"	Andy Wolk	Lukas Reiter	March 3, 2006	2T6714	11.52
Annabeth prosecutes a man accused of killing his mother-in-law after a long term of humiliation and abuse. The defense tries to accuse his wife of killing her own mother. Annabeth is shocked to discover that the man was having an affair with his mother-in-law, which the defense argues was a motive for the wife to kill her mother.
16	16	"Escape"	Charles Beeson	Alfredo Barrios Jr.	March 10, 2006	2T6716	9.88
Annabeth prosecutes a man who she had put in jail years earlier after robbing a jewelry store. The team later discovers that the women whom he had kidnapped in the process of escaping prison was an accomplice and lover to him. He then testifies that she was the one who came up with the escape plan and even killed a guard in the process.
17	17	"Land of Opportunity"	Jonathan Glassner	Leo Geter	March 31, 2006	2T6715	10.36
Annabeth's office investigates a number of real estate fraud cases. The case makes a complete turn when one of the real estate salesmen is found murdered. While Annabeth thinks that it was his boss that he was testifying against who committed the murder, she discovers that the victim's brother/co-worker was having an affair with his wife, which leads her to believe that the victim’s brother is the murderer.
18	18	"Still a Small Town"	Kevin Bray	Robert Levine	April 7, 2006	2T6717	10.85
Annabeth investigates former classmates after their high school friend is poisoned. While the team thinks that it is the wife who poisoned him for life insurance money, Annabeth discovers that the victim's best friend/business partner was stealing from his company, which leads her to believe that he poisoned him to stop him from finding out.
19	19	"Sex, Toys and Videotape"	Lewis H. Gould	Lindsay Sturman & Erica Shelton	April 28, 2006	2T6718	11.51
Annabeth investigates a case of a woman murdered the night before her wedding. She discovers that the woman had many secrets from her family, including that she was married previously. After the victim's fiance murders the accused in court, Annabeth discovers that he could have possibly been in on the murder all along after he mentions a secret about the relationship in his confession.
20	20	"The Shot"	Kevin Dowling	Don Winslow	May 5, 2006	2T6721	11.17
Annabeth investigates the case of a high school basketball player charged with murdering a teammate. Her case changes when she is convinced his father is lying when he confesses to the crime in order to save his son.
21	21	"David and Goliath"	Kevin Dowling	Don Winslow	May 12, 2006	2T6719	8.84
Annabeth brings a case against a professional baseball player and his celebrity lawyer who uses his client’s fame to convince the jury that he is not guilty. Aside from this obstacle, Annabeth's key witness to the case is the victim's alcoholic sister. This episode was inspired by the O.J. Simpson case.
22	22	"Hot Grrrl"	Paul McCrane	Alfredo Barrios Jr.	May 19, 2006	2T6720	9.76
Deputy Prosecutor Annabeth Chase is once again involved in an odd case when she prosecutes two teenagers for the murder of a man they claim was an online sexual predator. Upon further investigation, it is discovered that one of them, a girl, is running a website tricking her friends into playing stripping games on webcams she purchased for them and charging people to view her friends, who were unaware they were being watched. One of the teenagers agrees to testify that they knew the man and that they killed him because he threatened to report her pornographic website to the police and the media. After winning the case, Annabeth's co-workers inform her that her husband Jack has been killed by a drunk driver while on his way to pick up their daughter, Hailey.

=== Season 2 (2006–07) ===
Season two consisted of 22 episodes and was broadcast from September 2006 to May 2007. The main cast was changed with the start of the season after Christian Kane, who played Annabeth's husband, left the show because his character was killed by a drunk driver. David James Elliott joined the show as prosecutor James Conlon, replacing Steve Sharpe, who was played by John Carroll Lynch. Jon Seda and Cress Williams joined the cast as investigators Ray Blackwell and Ed Williams respectively.

No. overall	No. in season	Title	Directed by	Written by	Original release date	Prod. code	US viewers (millions)
23	1	"Community"	Kevin Dowling	William N. Fordes	September 22, 2006	3T5951	11.94
Annabeth comes back to work after her husband's death. She has to deal with a new boss and his assistants from New York City. Her first case involves the murder of a family and their neighbor execution style. They discover a secret about the family's past that leads them to different suspects.
24	2	"A House Divided"	Matt Earl Beesley	Lindsay Jewett Sturman & Leo Geter	September 29, 2006	3T5952	11.06
Annabeth prosecutes a woman claiming self-defense in her husband's murder. While one of her sons testifies that his mother was capable of murdering their father, the other son testifies that she isn't capable.
25	3	"Truly, Madly, Deeply"	John Peters	Antoinette Stella	October 6, 2006	3T5953	11.61
Annabeth prosecutes a man charged with raping his teenage neighbor. She discovers the neighbor could be involved with other rapes that were committed in the past. This episode was inspired by the Karla Homolka case.
26	4	"Deacon"	Lewis H. Gould	Tom Smuts	October 13, 2006	3T5954	10.95
Annabeth prosecutes a drug addict for the murder of a woman. She later discovers that the woman’s father is a serial killer that the police have been seeking for decades.
27	5	"Legacy"	Charles Beeson	William N. Fordes & Alison McDonald	October 20, 2006	3T5956	11.12
The team investigates the death of a woman and determines her husband and father-in-law were involved.
28	6	"Homecoming"	Janice Cooke Leonard	Elwood Reid	October 27, 2006	3T5955	10.83
The team investigates a case of two football players charged with murdering a teammate. The team later discovers illegal activities held within the program that ran the football team.
29	7	"Silent Auction"	Kevin Dowling	Lindsay Sturman & Antoinette Stella	November 3, 2006	3T5957	11.08
The team investigates the murder of a man during an event at his child's school and uncovers a secret relationship between him and another woman.
30	8	"There's Something About Martha"	Charles Beeson	Leo Geter	November 10, 2006	3T5958	11.38
The team investigate the death of a minister and find that his church's building fund is missing. The minister, on top of his own financial problems at home, had also fallen victim to a Nigerian Internet scam.
31	9	"Shoot to Kill"	Jeffrey G. Hunt	Jeremy R. Litman	November 17, 2006	3T5959	10.56
Annabeth investigates the murder case of a man and prosecutes his co-worker and his two sons, all of whom were near the murder site when it happened, purportedly looking for their lost dog. The co-worker apparently blamed the victim for causing him to lose his job, ending up working in a fast food joint – to his teenage son's embarrassment, when he found out while with his friends. When trying the three of them together proves difficult to pinpoint who pulled the trigger, the prosecutor's office decides to try each of the defendants separately.
32	10	"A Father's Story"	Mike Rohl	Elwood Reid	November 24, 2006	3T5960	10.06
After a man is cleared of murdering a girl, his defense attorneys are shot by the girl's father. Annabeth has to prosecute his case, while his attorneys argue that the original prosecutors are to blame. The team uncovers a secret from the previous trial that they fear the defense will summon into evidence. Annabeth tries to have the accused accept a plea agreement to avoid this secret from the previous case coming out.
33	11	"Prodigal Son"	Anthony Hemingway	Antoinette Stella & William N. Fordes	December 15, 2006	3T5961	9.65
Annabeth investigates the case of a woman killed on the night of her engagement. Her alcoholic uncle is the prime suspect. She learns that the victim's uncle has had a violent history, which leads her to believe he is the murderer.
34	12	"Road Rage"	Joseph Berger Davis	Deidre Shaw & Tom Smuts	January 5, 2007	3T5962	11.56
Annabeth investigates a case of road rage. She discovers that the accused has had a history with the victim, which leads her to believe that it was more than just a fight based on road rage.
35	13	"Getting In"	Kevin Dowling	Lindsay Jewett Sturman & Nikki Toscano	January 12, 2007	3T5963	10.38
Annabeth takes the case of a woman who died during plastic surgery, when her husband believes it is murder due to the heated history between his wife and the surgeon.
36	14	"Hoosier Hold 'Em"	Dermott Downs	Leo Geter	February 9, 2007	3T5964	10.46
Annabeth investigates the case of a gambling addict who robbed a bank to pay for his losses. However, the case turns when he is murdered. The team investigates the place where the gambling took place, which helps them uncover a secret the host of the gambling events has been hiding from all of the players.
37	15	"Barren"	Steve Boyum	Jami O'Brien & Teresa Huggins	February 16, 2007	3T5965	10.34
Annabeth investigates the case of a surrogate mother who was apparently murdered by the baby's biological mother.
38	16	"Internet Bride"	Tawnia McKiernan	Antoinette Stella & Mark Rosner	February 23, 2007	3T5966	10.10
The team investigates the case of a murder of a dean's wife made to look like suicide. The team flies in the victim's brother all the way from Russia to testify that the dean was not the man people thought he was.
39	17	"Protégé"	Matt Earl Beesley	Steve Lichtman	March 9, 2007	3T5967	9.62
The team must decide whether or not to pursue the death penalty in the case of a developmentally challenged defendant, who is accused of torturing and murdering a close friend and mentor of Annabeth's boss.
40	18	"Making Amends"	Jeffrey G. Hunt	Alison McDonald	March 30, 2007	3T5968	9.65
After a man confesses to a rape from 11 years ago, Annabeth tries to get the statute of limitations on the case increased. After getting this approved, the man tells her that there was another man involved in the rape in order to shorten his sentence.
41	19	"Maternal Instinct"	Lewis H. Gould	Hannah Shakespeare	April 6, 2007	3T5969	10.82
Annabeth prosecutes the case of a man accused of killing his father. The mother recants her testimony after she tells the police it was her son. This episode was inspired by the Christopher Porco case.
42	20	"Drink the Cup"	Christopher Leitch	Tom Smuts	April 27, 2007	3T5970	9.17
During a case against a drug dealer, the team uncovers a case of police corruption. After learning about the corruption within the police force, the team prosecutes the chief of police.
43	21	"Fall From Grace"	Jeffrey G. Hunt	Antoinette Stella	May 4, 2007	3T5971	9.25
Annabeth investigates the case of police corruption and re-prosecutes one officer after a witness in his first case is murdered. She discovers corruption and illegal activity within a youth shelter run by the police chief's wife.
44	22	"Eminent Domain"	Matt Earl Beesley	Story by : Tom Smuts & Leo Geter; Teleplay by : Eric Overmyer	May 11, 2007	3T5972	10.27
In the series finale, the case of the police officer continues after he is found guilty of murdering a witness from his first case. When he testifies against one of his accomplices, the accomplice, his lawyer, a detective and someone from the team is executed.
