= Jennette McCurdy (album) =

Studio album by Jennette McCurdy
- Released: June 5, 2012
- Recorded: 2010–2012
- Studio: Warner Studios (Nashville); The Grip; Blackbird Studios
- Genre: Country; country pop
- Length: 34:40
- Label: Capitol Nashville; EMI
- Producer: Paul Worley; Jay DeMarcus

Jennette McCurdy chronology
Jennette McCurdy (2012)	Jennette McCurdy (2012)

Singles from Jennette McCurdy
- 1. "Generation Love" Released: April 25, 2011

Jennette McCurdy is the only studio album by American singer, writer and former actress Jennette McCurdy, released on June 5, 2012, by Capitol Records Nashville. McCurdy was 21 days shy of her 20th birthday at the time of the release and co-wrote six of the ten songs on the album. The majority of the album was produced by Paul Worley, who also produced her debut extended play, Not That Far Away (2010), while Jay DeMarcus of Rascal Flatts produced the album's first two tracks. One single was released from the album, "Generation Love", which charted for seven weeks on the Billboard Hot Country Songs chart, peaking at number 44.

Upon its release, the album failed to chart in any market. McCurdy left Capitol Nashville shortly after the release of the album.

== Background and development ==
McCurdy developed an interest in country music after her grandmother introduced her to Patsy Cline's music when she was seven years old. At age eight, McCurdy appeared in Faith Hill's music video "The Way You Love Me". In 2007, aged 15, she was cast as Sam Puckett in Nickelodeon’s iCarly. When she was not on set, she would write songs. In an interview, McCurdy said:

"After work every day on set, I would go write with people. Then on the weekends, I would go record demos. I continued that process for a couple of years until eventually signing my deal. It wasn't like one day I just up and said, 'I'm going to do this.'"

== Release and aftermath ==
After the album failed to chart and after the release of the album, McCurdy confirmed that she had left Capitol Nashville, citing conflicts with a new series in which she was cast. In 2022, McCurdy described her music career as "a much-regretted country music blip".

== Track listing ==
Jennette McCurdy track listing
No.	Title	Writer(s)	Producer(s)	Length
1.	"Generation Love"	Ross Copperman; Tom Douglas; Heather Morgan	Jay DeMarcus	3:37
2.	"Don't You Just Hate Those People"	Mallary Hope; Tony Martin; Wendell Mobley	DeMarcus	2:53
3.	"Break Your Heart"	Hope; Mobley; Jennifer Schott	Paul Worley	3:23
4.	"Better"	Jennette McCurdy; Tommy Lee James; Liz Rose	Worley	3:14
5.	"Heart of a Child"	McCurdy; Charles Kelley; Dave Haywood	Worley	4:18
6.	"Love Is on the Way"	Dylan Altman; Eric Paslay; Jason Delkou	Worley	3:36
7.	"Stronger"	McCurdy; Blair Daly; Rachel Proctor	Worley	3:26
8.	"Put Your Arms Around Someone"	McCurdy; Jessi Alexander; Luke Laird	Worley	3:09
9.	"Place to Fall"	McCurdy; Ben Glover; Rachel Thibodeau; Kyle Jacobs	Worley	3:06
10.	"Have to Say Goodbye"	McCurdy; Alexander; Laird	Worley	3:48
Total length:				34:40

Jennette McCurdy – Digital website bonus download
No.	Title	Writer(s)	Producer(s)	Length
11.	"Broken Umbrella"	Josh Kear; Mark Irwin; Chris Tompkins	Worley; DeMarcus	3:19
Total length:				37:59

== Personnel ==
Credits adapted from album's liner notes.

- Jennette McCurdy – lead vocals, background vocals, songwriting
- Paul Worley – production, electric guitar
- Jay DeMarcus – production
- Chris McHugh – drums
- Mark Hill – bass
- Ilya Toshinsky – acoustic guitar
- Tom Bukovac – electric guitar
- Charlie Judge – keyboards
- Paul Franklin – steel guitar
- Russell Terrell – background vocals
- Jonathan Yudkin – fiddle, mandolin, strings
- Hillary Lindsey – background vocals
- Chad Cromwell – drums
- David Huff – drum loop, digital editing
- Micheal Rojas – piano, B3, synth, accordion
- Alison Prestwood – bass
- Rob McNelley – electric guitar
- Chris Rodriguez – electric guitar, harmony vocals
- Biff Waston – acoustic guitar
- Tania Hancheroff – harmony vocals
- Wes Hightower – harmony vocals
- Bruce Bouton – steel
- Kenny Greenberg – electric guitar
- Erik Hellerman – assistant engineer
- John Naiper – assistant engineer
- Adam Ayan – mastering
- Andrew Mendelson – mastering
- Steve Blackmoon – mixing assistant
- Andrew Bazinet – mixing assistant
- Sean Neff – digital editing
- Daniel Bacigalupi – mastering assistant
- Natthaphol Abhigantaphand – mastering assistant
- Shelley Anderson – mastering assistant
- Paige Conners – production coordination
- Justin Niebank – mixing
- Drew Bollman – mixing assistant
- Mike "Frog" Griffith – production coordination
- Jeremy Witt – production assistant
- Clarke Schleicher – mixing
- Joanna Carter – art director
- Michelle Hall – art production
- Kristin Barlowe – photography
- Bibi Bielat – design

== Release history ==
Release dates and formats for Jennette McCurdy
Region	Date	Format(s)	Label
United States	June 5, 2012	Digital download; streaming	Capitol Nashville; EMI
Various	August 9, 2015	Digital download; streaming	Universal
