= Not That Far Away =

2010 single by Jennette McCurdy

Single by Jennette McCurdy

from the EP Not That Far Away
- Released: May 24, 2010
- Recorded: 2010
- Studio: Warner Studios; (Nashville, Tennessee)
- Genre: Country pop
- Length: 3:24
- Label: Capitol Nashville
- Songwriters: Blair Daly; Jennette McCurdy; Rachel Proctor
- Producer: Paul Worley

Jennette McCurdy singles chronology
"Homeless Heart" (2009)	"Not That Far Away" (2010)	"Generation Love" (2011)

Music video
- "Not That Far Away" on YouTube

"Not That Far Away" is a song recorded by American singer and actress Jennette McCurdy from her debut EP of the same name. Written by McCurdy, Blair Daly and Rachel Proctor, it was released to country radio on May 24, 2010, and as a music download on June 1, 2010.

== Content ==
"Not That Far Away" is an up-tempo Country Pop song featuring prominent banjo and electric guitar with steel guitar fills. The song's female narrator describes the scenario of a young girl, who dreams of becoming a country artist, heading out of town to Nashville, Tennessee in pursuit of her dream. In leaving, she finds herself assuring her mother that she is "not that far away" from her hometown in California.

McCurdy said that "this song really captures the last year of my life. I've been in Nashville writing for and recording my record and following my dream while really missing my family and friends back in Garden Grove, California." The single was chosen in a fan-voted poll that featured samples of six songs from her upcoming record; "Not That Far Away," with 30% of the total votes, was selected for release.

== Reception ==
Jim Malec of The 9513 gave the song a thumbs down, comparing the song unfavorably with something Carrie Underwood might record. He stated that while he believes McCurdy "proves herself a generally capable vocalist," he noted that her voice "lacks Underwood’s pristine tonal quality, outstanding vocal control and incredible power."

Jim Kiest remarked, "A perfectly credible, fairly forgettable, country debut about chasing dreams...Fans of her show might have been expecting McCurdy to be a mean-girl counterpart to Taylor Swift; keep hoping, kids, but it hasn't happened yet."

== Music video ==
The music video, which was directed by Roman White and shot in Watertown, Tennessee, premiered on Nickelodeon and CMT on August 14, 2010. In the video, McCurdy is shown moving into a new home, arranging furniture and putting up pictures of her alongside her mother. She then takes her guitar and walks through town, eventually making her way to a coffee shop, where she performs the song during open mic night. Throughout the video, McCurdy is also shown talking on the phone and writing in a journal, as well as singing the song from various locations.

== Credits and personnel ==
Credits adapted from single liner notes.

- Jennette McCurdy – vocals, songwriter
- Rachel Proctor – songwriter
- Blair Daly – songwriter
- Paul Worley – production
- Andrew Mendelson – mastering
- Shelley Anderson – mastering assistant
- Daniel Bacigalupi – mastering assistant
- Natthaphol Abhigantaphand – mastering assistant
- Clarke Schleicher – mixing, recording
- Andrew Bazinet – recording
- Steve Blackmon – recording
- John Napier – recording
- Jeremy Witt – production assistant
- Paige Conners – production coordination

== Chart performance ==
"Not That Far Away" debuted and peaked at number 58 on the U.S. Billboard Hot Country Songs chart for the week of July 10, 2010.

Weekly chart performance for "Not That Far Away"
Chart (2010)	Peak position
US Country Songs (Billboard)	58

== Release history ==
"Not That Far Away" release history
Region	Date	Format	Label	Ref.
United States	May 24, 2010	Country radio	Capitol Nashville	
United States	June 1, 2010	Digital download	Capitol Nashville	
