= Wild Horses (American country band) =

American country music band

- Also known as: NuWest
- Origin: Temple, Texas, United States
- Genres: Country
- Years active: 1990–2008
- Labels: Epic, Persimmon
- Past members: Rich Fabec; Steven Kellough; Michael Blake Mahler; Ralph McCauley; Angela Rae; Lon Holland; Joe Lee Koenig; Chris Sigmon

Wild Horses, formerly NuWest, was an American country music band from Temple, Texas. The band was composed of Angela Rae (lead vocals) and Michael Blake Mahler (guitar), who were wife and husband, along with Rich Fabec (guitar), Stephen Kellough (bass guitar), and Ralph McCauley (drums). Fabec was later replaced by Joe Lee Koenig, with Lon Holland (keyboards) and Chris Sigmon (steel guitar) joining as well. In 2001, the band was featured on the compilation Dancin' with Thunder, which included their song "I Will Survive". This song charted on Billboard Hot Country Songs in 2001.

== History ==
The band was founded in 1990 in Temple, Texas, as NuWest. It initially consisted of lead vocalist Angela Rae and her husband Michael Blake Mahler on guitar, along with guitarist Rich Fabec, bass guitarist Stephen Kellough, and drummer Ralph McCauley. In 1993, they competed in Country Caravan, a talent competition held by Jim Beam. This led to them being selected by a number of talent booking agents, one of whom selected them as the first act to perform at Bally's Casino (now 1st Jackpot Casino Tunica) in Tunica, Mississippi, when it opened in 1995. They also became regular performers at Sweetwater Inn, a bar in Kellough's hometown of Golconda, Illinois.

In 1996, the band changed its name to Wild Horses after discovering other acts had similar names to NuWest. At this point they had been in negotiations with Warner Records, but these negotiations were canceled. They also submitted a demo to Blue Eyed Records, an independent label started by Dolly Parton, in 1996. Throughout the 1990s, the band was in negotiations with Mercury Records and Atlantic Records, but was never signed to either. In February 2001, they submitted a demo to Epic Records Nashville, working with producer Joe Scaife to do so. By 2001, Joe Lee Koenig (a childhood friend of Rae and Mahler) had replaced Fabec as second guitarist, and keyboardist Lon Holland and steel guitarist Chris Sigmon had joined as well. The band's song "I Will Survive" was included on the 2001 compilation album Dancin' with Thunder, a multi-artist compilation released by Epic Records in association with Professional Bull Riders. "I Will Survive" charted for eleven weeks on Billboard Hot Country Songs, peaking at number 46. By June, the band began working on a debut album for Epic, and the label had selected a song called "When Will You Love Me Again" with the intent of sending it to country radio as a single. However, Wild Horses was dropped Epic in August 2002 due to a label re-structuring, which also led to Koenig leaving.

Rae, Mahler, McCauley, Kellough, Holland, and Sigmon continued to perform in southern Illinois in the first decade of the 21st century. In 2003, they self-released an album titled Frontier Free for All, featuring the single "You Gotta Ride". Kellough had his left leg amputated in 2005 due to an industrial accident, which further delayed any recordings by the band until 2007.

== Discography ==
=== Albums ===
Title	Album details
Frontier Free for All	Release date: April 8, 2003; Label: Persimmon Records
Unbroken	Release date: June 26, 2007; Label: Dreamkeeper Records

=== Singles ===
Year	Single	Peak positions	Album
Year	Single	US Country	Album
2001	"I Will Survive"	46	Dancin' with Thunder
2003	"You Gotta Ride"	—	Frontier Free for All
2003	"Safely Home"	—	Frontier Free for All
2008	"Surrounded"	—	Unbroken
"—" denotes releases that did not chart
