= Research on Social Work Practice =

- Discipline: Social work
- Language: English
- Edited by: Bruce A. Thyer

Publication details
- History: 1991-present
- Publisher: SAGE Publications
- Frequency: Bimonthly
- Impact factor: 1.929 (2017)

Standard abbreviations
- ISO 4: Res. Soc. Work Pract.

Indexing
- ISSN: 1049-7315 (print); 1552-7581 (web)
- LCCN: 91643094
- OCLC no.: 609948404

Links
- Journal homepage; Online access; Online archive

Research on Social Work Practice is a peer-reviewed academic journal that covers research in the field of social work, including community practice, organizational management, and the evaluation of social policies. The journal's editor-in-chief is Bruce A. Thyer (Florida State University College of Social Work). It was established in 1991 and is currently published by SAGE Publications.

== Abstracting and indexing ==
Research on Social Work Practice is abstracted and indexed in Scopus and the Social Sciences Citation Index. According to the Journal Citation Reports, its 2017 impact factor is 1.929, ranking it 8 out of 42 journals in the category "Social Work". Research on Social Work Practice plays a critical role in bridging the gap between research and practice, ensuring that findings are accessible and applicable to real-world settings. By fostering collaboration among scholars and practitioners, it contributes to the ongoing development of effective solutions to social challenges.
