= Generation Love =

2011 single by Jennette McCurdy

Single by Jennette McCurdy

from the album Jennette McCurdy
- B-side: "Put Your Arms Around Someone"
- Released: March 11, 2011
- Recorded: 2010
- Studio: Warner Studios (Nashville, Tennessee)
- Genre: Country pop
- Length: 3:39
- Label: Capitol Nashville
- Songwriters: Tom Douglas; Heather Morgan; Ross Copperman
- Producer: Jay DeMarcus

Jennette McCurdy singles chronology
"Not That Far Away" (2010)	"Generation Love" (2011)

Music video
- "Generation Love" on YouTube

"Generation Love" is a song recorded by American former singer Jennette McCurdy from her self-titled debut album. Written by Ross Copperman, Tom Douglas and Heather Morgan and produced by Jay DeMarcus of Rascal Flatts, "Generation Love" was released digitally as a single on March 11, 2011, and was later serviced to country radio on April 25, 2011. The song was included on the iCarly soundtrack album, iCarly: iSoundtrack II.

"Generation Love" has been praised by music critics and became McCurdy's best performing single on the Billboard Hot Country Songs chart.

== Composition ==
"Generation Love" is a modern country song, featuring pedal steel guitar and melodic banjo, while also having pop influences. The song's female narrator laments on the modern generation, which is seen as selfish and caught up in mainly the technological world, but also have problems such as being children of divorce and victims of dysfunction. It is contrasted with the early generations of the Great Depression, war veterans and the post-World War II generation that performed feats such as landing on the Moon.

Cristen Maher of Taste of Country describes the song as, "slower in tempo and truly showcases McCurdy's vocals." Additionally, Maher adds, "As the melody of the song builds towards the chorus, a banjo joins the mix of twangy guitars and beating drums, giving the song a true country feel."

Generation Love (2011)
A 23-second sample of "Generation Love" by Jennette McCurdy

== Promotion and performances ==
To promote the single, McCurdy headlined her own mall tour, Generation Love for St. Jude. McCurdy traveled to and performed at multiple different malls within the United States. All proceeds from the event went towards St. Jude Children's Research Hospital.

== Music video ==
The music video, which was directed by Roman White premiered on CMT around April 29, 2011. The video opens with McCurdy singing on the rooftop of a building with the ground littered with paper hearts. Throughout the video, it shows the younger generation with white balloons with a red heart on them, while others hold up signs of things they do to help the community. The younger generation passes the balloon on to the older generation, who eventually let them go and into the air. At the end of the video, the sky behind McCurdy is filled with balloons and she releases her own balloon into the sky.

== Credits and personnel ==
Credits adapted from Jennette McCurdy liner notes.

- Jennette McCurdy – vocals
- Russel Terrell – background vocals
- Tom Douglas – songwriter
- Heather Morgan – songwriter
- Ross Copperman – songwriter
- Jay DeMarcus – producer
- Chris McHugh – drums
- Mark Hill – bass
- Ilya Toshinsky – acoustic guitar
- Tom Bukovac – electric guitar
- Charlie Judge – keyboard
- Paul Franklin - steel guitar

== Charts and performance ==
"Generation Love" debuted at number 57 on the U.S. Billboard Hot Country Songs chart for the week starting May 14, 2011.

Weekly chart performance for "Generation Love"
Chart (2011)	Peak position
US Hot Country Songs (Billboard)	44

== Release history ==
Region	Date	Format	Label(s)
United States	March 11, 2011	Digital download	Capitol Nashville
United States	April 25, 2011	Radio airplay	Capitol Nashville
