= Rachel Proctor =

American singer-songwriter

- Born: Rachel Christine Proctor; August 11, 1974 (age 51)
- Origin: Charleston, West Virginia, US
- Genres: Country
- Occupation: Singer-songwriter
- Instruments: Vocals, guitar
- Years active: 2002–present
- Label: BNA

Rachel Christine Proctor (born August 11, 1974) is an American country music artist. Before signing to a record deal, she co-wrote Martina McBride's 2002 single "Where Would You Be". By 2003, Proctor had signed to BNA Records, releasing her debut single "Days Like This" that year. This song, which peaked at number 24 on the country charts, was the first of four singles from her 2004 debut album Where I Belong. Proctor's only album for the label, it also produced her highest-charting single in the number 18 "Me and Emily". Although she has not charted a single since 2004, she has written singles for Jessica Simpson and Jesse Lee. Proctor has also had songs recorded by Blake Shelton, Gary Allan, Jana Kramer, Lauren Alaina, and Kenny Loggins. In March 2013, Proctor signed an exclusive songwriting agreement with Big Tractor Music Publishing (owned by producer Scott Hendricks).

== Biography ==
Proctor was born in Charleston, West Virginia, daughter of Danny Proctor, a selfless man, known for his gracious heart and thoughtful donations of time and labor whenever he could help. When she was in grade school, she appeared in local productions of Annie and The Sound of Music. By the time she was in junior high school, she had signed with a New York management company that also managed New Kids on the Block. Proctor also competed on the television talent show Star Search, and by the time she was eighteen, she had begun writing songs and performing in local bands as well. (One band in which she performed also included a then-unknown Blake Shelton.)

Proctor moved to Nashville, Tennessee in the mid 1990s in pursuit of a record deal. By the late 1990s, The Lynns, Sonya Isaacs, and Kortney Kayle had all recorded some of her compositions. In 2002, Martina McBride released "Where Would You Be", another one of Proctor's compositions, which reached number 3 on the Billboard country charts. Proctor also sang backing vocals on Shelton's 2002 single "Ol' Red". Later that same year, Proctor signed to BNA Records, releasing her debut single "Days Like This" in 2003. The song, which served as the lead-off single to her debut album Where I Belong, reached 24 on the country charts. It was followed by the number 43 "Didn't I", and then in 2004 by her highest chart hit, the number 18 "Me and Emily". Finally, the album's title track was released as its fourth single, peaking at 37. Proctor left BNA records to return to songwriting full-time. She has released two independent albums, "What Didn't Kill Me" and "Only Lonely Girl." Proctor, along with Victoria Banks, co-wrote Jessica Simpson's 2008 singles "Come On Over" and "Remember That", the former of which was Simpson's first country single. She also co-wrote Jesse Lee's 2009 debut single "It's a Girl Thing" in collaboration with Banks, as well as Jennette McCurdy's 2010 single "Not That Far Away" and Lauren Alaina's 2012 single "Georgia Peaches".

== Discography ==
=== Albums ===
Title	Album details	Peak chart positions	
Title	Album details	US Country	US
Where I Belong	Release date: August 10, 2004; Label: BNA Records	8	66
Only Lonely Girl	Release date: October 26, 2007; Label: self-released	—	—
What Didn't Kill Me	Release date: August 11, 2009; Label: self-released	—	—
"—" denotes releases that did not chart

=== Singles ===
Year	Single	Peak chart positions		Album
Year	Single	US Country	US Bubbling	Album
2003	"Days Like This"	24	—	Where I Belong
2004	"Didn't I"	43	—	Where I Belong
2004	"Me and Emily"	18	10	Where I Belong
2004	"Where I Belong"	37	—	Where I Belong
"—" denotes releases that did not chart

=== Music videos ===
Year	Video	Director
2004	"Me and Emily"	Kristin Barlowe
