= Emi Nietfeld =

Memoirist, essayist and former software developer

Margaret Frances Nietfeld, known professionally as Emi Nietfeld, is a memoirist, essayist and former software developer from Minnesota. Following a childhood spent in foster care and psychiatric treatment, Nietfeld graduated from Harvard University with a degree in computer science. She became known after she wrote an op-ed for The New York Times about the sexual harassment she faced as a former employee of Google. In 2022, Penguin Press published her memoir Acceptance, in which she questioned concepts of social mobility and resilience by describing her journey to Harvard. Acceptance received positive critical reviews.

Nietfeld frequently contributes essays about fertility, technology and inequality to publications including The Atlantic, The Washington Post and Teen Vogue, including the piece "The Baby Died. Whose Fault Is It?"

== Early life and education ==
Nietfeld is from Minnesota. Her parents are Rosella F. Stow, a retired forensic photographer, and Theresa J. Nietfeld. She has described her mother as an evangelical Christian with a hoarding disorder. According to Nietfeld, the accumulation of waste attracted mice, and she struggled to take showers because the bathtub was full of trash. When Nietfeld was in the fifth grade, her parents divorced after her father came out as transgender.

Aged 13, Nietfeld attempted suicide. Aged 14, she was hospitalised in the Methodist Hospital Eating Disorder Institute. She subsequently spent seven months in a residential treatment centre and foster care. After attending camp at Interlochen Center for the Arts, she won a merit scholarship to attend boarding school at Interlochen. She initially studied visual art before switching to the creative writing program. While in high school, Nietfeld participated in National Novel Writing Month, and she won a Horatio Alger Association of Distinguished Americans scholarship for "overcoming adversity".

Nietfeld viewed attendance at an Ivy League university as an opportunity to escape her "family problems". She was homeless, living in her Toyota Corolla, while she was applying to universities. In the summer before going to university, she backpacked in Europe and was raped in Budapest by a hostel worker. She graduated from Harvard University, where she majored in computer science.

== Career ==
=== Software development ===
Upon graduating from Harvard, Nietfeld had a job offer from Google to work as a software enginner. She worked there from 2015 to 2019.

After being sexually harassed by a male manager for over a year, she left Google, and she wrote about this experience in an op-ed for The New York Times titled "After Working at Google, I'll Never Let Myself Love a Job Again". Nietfeld alleged that she was forced to have one-on-one meetings with her harasser and sit near him, even after her complaints against him had been verified. In the days after the essay's publication, more than 500 Google workers petitioned Alphabet to mandate that employees with verified complaints against them to be prohibited from managing others. In response to the petition, Nietfeld told The Verge, "It reminds me of how great some of my former colleagues were and why I loved working with them."

=== Writing ===
==== Acceptance ====
Nietfeld's memoir Acceptance was published by Penguin Press on 2 August 2022. Acceptance recounts Nietfeld's childhood and her journey to study at Harvard University, while questioning concepts of resilience, social mobility and narratives of overcoming hardship. After having the idea while in high school, Nietfeld began writing her memoir Acceptance while working at Google. To prepare the memoir, she reviewed over 10,000 of her previous emails and personal documents including her health records. She was influenced by Educated by Tara Westover, and Know My Name by Chanel Miller.

NPR and Amazon chose Acceptance as their best book of 2022. In the Cleveland Review of Books, Lauren Bittrich wrote, "In breaking from the Cinderella-story convention of social mobility memoirs, Acceptance achieves exceptional candor and beauty." For The New York Times, Jordan Kisner praised Nietfeld's passionate critique of the hero's journey and criticised the memoir's pacing.

==== Essays and journalism ====
Nietfeld has written for the publications including The New York Times, The Atlantic, Teen Vogue, The Washington Post, and New York Magazine. For her essays, she was nominated for the Pushcart Prize, and she was mentioned in The Best American Essays of 2021. She has reported on technology, fertility and inequality. Nietfled has stated that she is inspired to write about "what drives me crazy, and what I wake up in the night and can't stop thinking about."

In 2025, Nietfeld wrote an essay titled "The Baby Died. Whose Fault Is It?" for Wired, in which she explored the surrogacy industry and reproductive technology in the US. Stacey Lee Kong described the 6,000-word-long feature as "well-written, extremely compelling—and disturbing." The article won the best magazine feature in the category of science, medicine and technology from the New York Press Club Awards for Journalism.

== Personal life ==
Nietfeld identifies as bisexual. She is married to software engineering manager Byron Hood, who she met in 2014 in San Francisco. They live together in Manhattan's East Village.
