= Amy Deasismont discography =

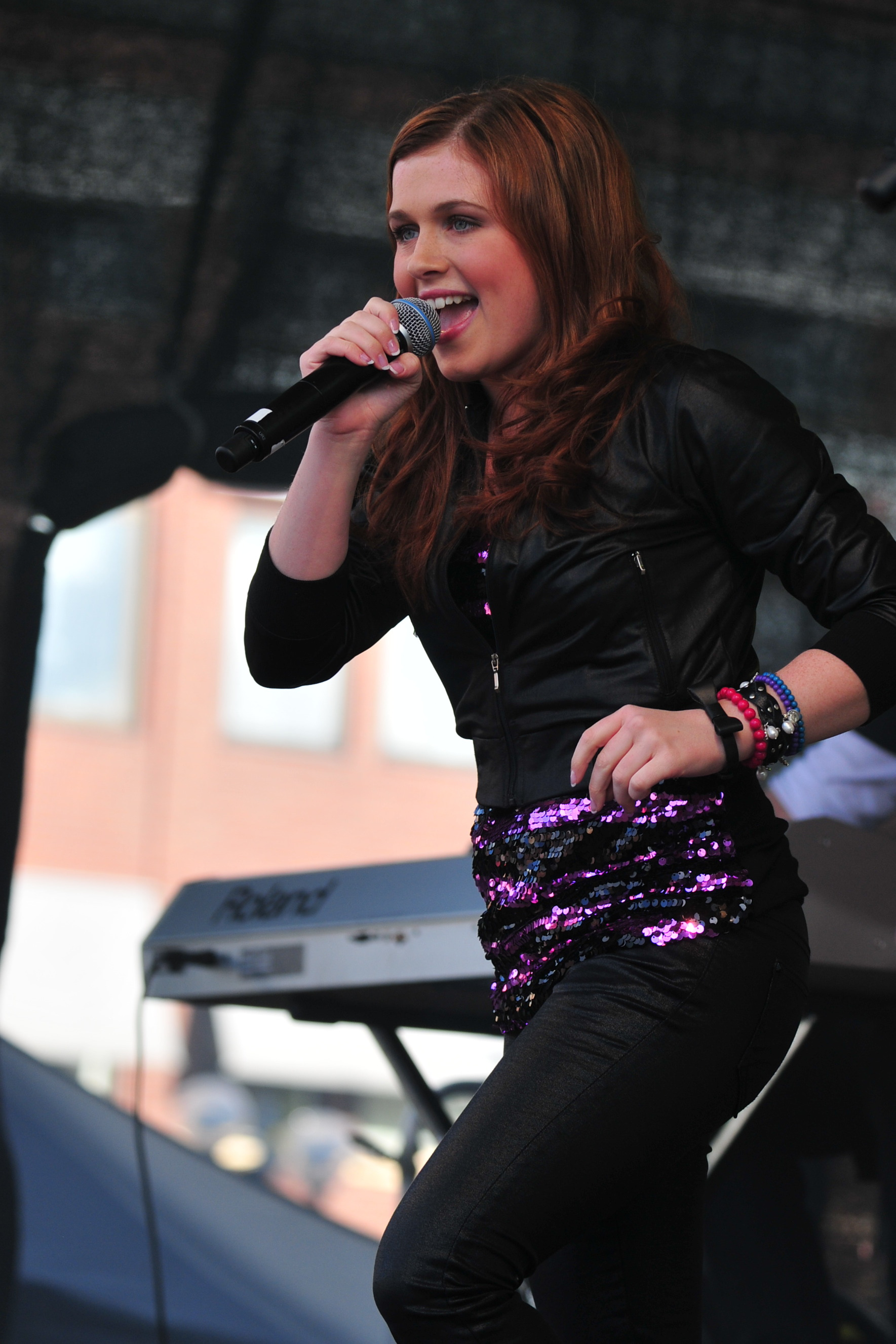
- Amy Diamond appearing at 2011 Kulturnatta 2011 Umeå.
- Studio albums: 5
- Compilation albums: 1
- Singles: 16

The discography of Swedish recording artist Amy Deasismont, consists of five studio albums, one compilation album, eighteen official singles and counting. Deasismont became popular in 2005, when she released her platinum-certificated single "What's in It for Me". The song is her biggest hit to date, remaining in the top ten in Sweden, Denmark, Norway and Poland. This Is Me Now, the singer's first studio album, was released after the huge success of "What's in It for Me", in 2005 in several European countries - it became popular in the Scandinavian countries and was certified Platinum by the IFPI in Sweden. Her later albums and singles were not as popular as her debut releases, but was somewhat successful in Sweden.

== Albums ==
=== Studio albums ===
List of albums, with selected chart positions and certifications
Title	Album details	Peak chart positions				Certifications
Title	Album details	SWE	DEN	FIN	NOR	Certifications
This Is Me Now	Released: 18 May 2005; Format: CD, digital download; Label: Bonnier Amigo Music Group (Cat. no. 33422313)	2	22	21	19	SWE: Platinum
Still Me Still Now	Released: 24 May 2006; Format: CD, digital download; Label: Bonnier Amigo Music Group (Cat. no. 33422643)	2	25	34	—	SWE: Gold
Music In Motion	Released: 28 November 2007; Format: CD, digital download; Label: Bonnier Amigo Music Group (Cat. no. 33424033)	3	—	—	—	SWE: Gold
En helt ny jul	Released: 19 November 2008; Format: CD, digital download; Label: Bonnier Amigo Music Group (Cat. no. 33424763)	8	—	—	—	SWE: Gold
Swings and Roundabouts	Released: 21 October 2009; Format: CD, digital download; Label: Bonnier Amigo Music Group (Cat. no. 33425243)	16	—	—	—	SWE: Gold
"—" denotes items which were not released in that country or failed to chart.

=== Compilations ===
List of albums, with selected details
Title	Album details and chart position
Greatest Hits	Released: 29 October 2010; Format: CD, digital download; Label: Cosmos Music Group; SWE peak position: No. 12

== Singles ==
List of singles, with selected chart positions and certifications, showing year released and album name
Title	Year	Peak chart positions						Certifications	Albums
Title	Year	SWE	DEN	FIN	GER	NOR	POL	Certifications	Albums
"What's in It for Me"	2005	1	3	10	36	1	1	SWE: Platinum; DEN: Gold	This Is Me Now
"Welcome to the City"	2005	3	—	—	—	—	—	SWE: Gold	This Is Me Now
"Champion"	2005	—	—	—	—	—	—		This Is Me Now
"Shooting Star"	2005	—	—	—	—	—	—		This Is Me Now
"Don't Cry Your Heart Out"	2006	2	—	—	—	—	—		Still Me Still Now
"Big Guns"	2006	23	—	—	—	—	—		Still Me Still Now
"It Can Only Get Better"	2006	19	—	—	—	—	—		Still Me Still Now
"Is It Love?"	2007	9	—	—	—	—	—		Music In Motion (and Gold Edition)
"Stay My Baby"	2007	4	—	—	—	—	—		Music In Motion (and Gold Edition)
"Thank You"	2008	8	—	—	—	—	—		Music In Motion (and Gold Edition)
"It's My Life"	2009	14	—	—	—	—	—		Swings and Roundabouts
"Up!"	2009	4	—	—	—	—	—		Swings and Roundabouts
"Only You"	2010	9	—	—	—	—	—		Greatest Hits
"Your Love"	2013	—	—	—	—	—	—		Non-album singles
"One" (original or acoustic versions)	2016	—	—	—	—	—	—		Non-album singles
"Forgive"	2016	—	—	—	—	—	—		Non-album singles
"This Is How We Party"	2016	—	—	—	—	—	—		Non-album singles
"—" denotes items which were not released in that country or failed to chart.

Promotional singles

- 2008 - "En helt ny jul" from En helt ny jul album
- 2010 - "Ready to Fly" from Greatest Hits album
