= About You Now (EP) =

EP by Miranda Cosgrove
- Released: February 3, 2009
- Recorded: 2008
- Genres: Pop rock; electropop
- Length: 15:47
- Labels: Nickelodeon; Columbia
- Producers: Benny Blanco; Matt Beckley; Greg Kurstin

Miranda Cosgrove chronology
| About You Now (2009) | Sparks Fly (2010) |

Singles from About You Now
- 1. "About You Now" Released: January 28, 2009

About You Now is the debut extended play by American actress and singer Miranda Cosgrove, released by Nickelodeon Records and Columbia Records, exclusively to the North American iTunes Store on February 3, 2009. The EP was used to promote Cosgrove's song of the same name, released in the final quarter of 2008. Aside from featuring remixes of previous songs of Cosgrove's, the album also featured two tracks, "FYI" and "Party Girl". "About You Now" is a cover of the Sugababes hit single. It became Cosgrove's second song to chart on Billboard Hot 100 chart, peaking at number 47, her highest peak to date. Cosgrove promoted the song and the accompanying album mainly through interviews and performances, including at the 2008 Macy's Thanksgiving Day Parade.

== Background and development ==
Cosgrove's musical career first began with her recording the theme song of the Nickelodeon television series iCarly called "Leave It All to Me", on which Cosgrove stars as the title character on the show. The song features her former Drake & Josh castmate Drake Bell, and was written by Michael Corcoran, one of Bell's band members. Following the success of iCarly, Columbia Records released a soundtrack album of the show on June 10, 2008. The soundtrack album included four songs recorded by Cosgrove that were "Leave It All to Me", "Stay My Baby", "About You Now" and "Headphones On". Cosgrove stated, "Before that, I didn't see myself making an album, but when I spent time in the studio doing the theme song and saw how much fun it was, I wanted to go back."

In July 2008, she officially announced plans for a debut album, stating that the album was "different" from her contributions to the iCarly soundtrack, with her "co-writing and getting really into it", and saying that "[I'm] playing a character on iCarly, but this shows more of myself. On February 3, 2009, Cosgrove released her debut solo recording; the 5-song EP About You Now exclusively onto the iTunes Store. The EP included the title track "About You Now", a remix of it, a remix of "Stay My Baby", "FYI" and "Party Girl".

== Composition ==
The first track on the album is "About You Now", which is a cover of a song by the Sugababes. Musically, the song is a mid-tempo pop-rock track, that follows a verse to chorus guideline. It lyrically speaks of a girl who is over a fight her and her intimate other had, and now knows how she feels "about him now". On the Billboard Hot 100, the song reached a peak position of number 47. "FYI" is the second song on the album. Musically, the song is an uptempo punk rock type of song, that lyrically speaks of Cosgrove's romantic feelings for someone, and the song follows Cosgrove expressing her feelings for him in the lyrics. "Party Girl", the third track on the album, has more of a pop feel than the rest of the album. Musically, it is an uptempo pop song, that lyrically speaks of Cosgrove's longing to party and hang out with her friends.

Also included on the extended play are two remixes. The first of these is the spider remix of "Stay My Baby", a song recently released by Cosgrove from the soundtrack to her iCarly television series. The song, originally a ballad, has now been given a pop and dance beat. Lyrically, the song speaks of Cosgrove knowing that everything will be okay, as long as he "stays her baby". The final track on the album is the Spider Remix of "About You Now". The new version of the album has removed the guitar from the song and replaced it with more of an electropop type of sound.

== Critical reception ==
Commonsensemedia stated that "While Cosgrove's acting career has advanced considerably, her singing sounds similar to her passable vocal performance in School of Rock. Problem is, that was six years ago, when Cosgrove was nine years old. As a result, the synth-pop pattern that pervades so much of today's tween music doesn't come across as well for Cosgrove as it does for other bubblegum popsters with slightly stronger voices, like Miley Cyrus and Jordan McCoy. No doubt her TV popularity will still draw fans to this EP, but the release won't go down as one of the better ones in tween-music history." In their review of the album, The Daily Vault stated "As it turns out, Cosgrove is tackling non-tween material, trying to convince her adult listeners she's not as young as you might think. She wants to go back in time to a previous point in her relationship with the subject in the disc's title track since she "knows how I feel about you now." She sings about how girls "dig rejection" and how she'd rather "rock, that's how I roll" in "FYI." Finally, in the third original track on this EP, she spouts on and on about how "you can take the rock out of the roll but you can't take the party out of the girl" in "Party Girl." Finally, in "Stay My Baby," she speculates about being in a long distance relationship when "she's back at school," which I infer as being college? So, Cosgrove is tackling adult problems while singing to a tween audience."

== Promotion and performances ==
The song "About You Now" was first performed live during the 2008 Macy's Thanksgiving Day Parade. The performance saw Cosgrove singing the song while on a float. During the Summer of 2010, Cosgrove embarked on a radio promotional tour, and has made appearances at radio concerts. On September 6, 2010, she performed "Kissin U", "BAM", which was written and produced by Rock Mafia and Darkchild, and "About You Now", which is a cover, co-written by Cathy Dennis and Dr. Luke who produced it and was originally recorded by the Sugababes and released as a single on their fifth studio album Change, on Today.

Cosgrove headlined her own tour, titled Dancing Crazy Tour which is named after Cosgrove's new single "Dancing Crazy" co-written by Avril Lavigne and Max Martin and Shellback, who produced it and will be released on Cosgrove's second EP High Maintenance, released on March 15, 2011. The tour began January 24, 2011 and ended February 24, 2011. The tour featured dates in House of Blues locations such as ones located in Houston, TX and Anaheim, CA. She also performed at several theatres on the tour including locations in cities such as Atlanta, GA, Tampa, FL and Orlando FL. Accompanying Cosgrove on the tour was Greyson Chance, who rose to fame when a video of him singing "Paparazzi" by Lady Gaga emerged on popular video sharing website YouTube. Chance performed several of his own original songs, as well as covers from famous artists. The tour was financially successful. The second show on the tour, which took place in Minneapolis, sold about 54% of its tickets. The shows total gross revenue was $37,256. The fourth show of the tour, which took place in Rosemont, Illinois, was much more successful, selling 90% of the available tickets. The total gross revenue for the show was $118,435.

"About You Now" is one of the tracks in the Japanese edition of Cosgrove's debut album Sparks Fly.

== Track listing ==
About You Now
| No. | Title | Writer(s) | Length |
|---|---|---|---|
| 1. | "About You Now" | Lukasz Gottwald; Cathy Dennis | 3:11 |
| 2. | "FYI" | Miranda Cosgrove; Lauren Christy; Graham Edwards; Scott Spock | 3:02 |
| 3. | "Party Girl" | Greg Wells; Kara DioGuardi | 3:12 |
| 4. | "Stay My Baby" (Spider remix) | Max Martin; Tommy Tysper; Savan Kotecha | 2:59 |
| 5. | "About You Now" (Spider remix) | Gottwald; Dennis | 3:24 |
| Total length: | | | 15:47 |

Notes

- "About You Now" is a cover of the song by Sugababes, which was released in 2007.
- "Stay My Baby" is a cover of the song by Amy Diamond, which was released in 2007.
