= ICarly (soundtrack) =

iCarly: Music from and Inspired by the Hit TV Show

Soundtrack album by various artists
- Released: June 10, 2008
- Recorded: 2007–2008
- Genres: Pop; pop rock; dance-pop; teen pop; power pop
- Length: 43:57
- Labels: Nickelodeon; Columbia
- Producer: Michael Corcoran

Singles from iCarly: Music from and Inspired by the Hit TV Show
- 1. "Leave It All to Me" Released: December 18, 2007

Professional ratings
Review scores
Source	Rating
AllMusic	3.5/5 stars

iCarly: Music from and Inspired by the Hit TV Show is the soundtrack album of the Nickelodeon television series of the same name, which premiered on September 8, 2007. It debuted on the Billboard 200 at number 28 with 20,000 copies sold in its opening week. A follow-up soundtrack called iCarly: iSoundtrack II was released on January 24, 2012.

== Songs ==
"Leave It All to Me", performed by Miranda Cosgrove featuring Drake Bell, was released on December 18, 2007. "Stay My Baby", performed by Miranda Cosgrove, was released as a promotional single on June 5, 2008. It was originally sung by Swedish singer Amy Diamond in 2007. The track "Headphones On" was included on Rock Band as a DLC, first released as a free downloadable song then later was sold for US$1.99 on the Rock Band store.

== Track listing ==
No.	Title	Artist	Length
1.	"Leave It All to Me" (Theme Song)	Miranda Cosgrove featuring Drake Bell	2:41
2.	"Stay My Baby"	Miranda Cosgrove	3:05
3.	"Headphones On"	Miranda Cosgrove	3:10
4.	"Beautiful Girls" (Nickelodeon mix)	Sean Kingston	3:43
5.	"Dance Floor Anthem"	Good Charlotte	4:04
6.	"I Like That Girl"	Leon Thomas III	3:02
7.	"Girlfriend" (Nickelodeon Mix)	Avril Lavigne featuring Lil Mama	3:05
8.	"Freckles"	Natasha Bedingfield	3:45
9.	"Face in the Hall"	Naked Brothers Band	3:20
10.	"Let's Hear It for the Boy"	The Stunners	3:00
11.	"Thunder"	Boys Like Girls	3:56
12.	"Move"	Menudo	3:31
13.	"I'm Grown"	Tiffany Evans featuring Bow Wow	3:35
Total length:			43:57

Deluxe edition
No.	Title	Artist	Length
14.	"Leave It All to Me" (Jason Nevins remix; featuring Drake Bell)	Miranda Cosgrove	3:56
15.	"Whatever My Love"	Austin Butler	3:56
16.	"Take Me Back"	Backhouse Mike	3:31
Total length:			55:20

Digital reissue
No.	Title	Artist	Length
1.	"The Countdown"	iCarly cast	0:15
2.	"Leave It All to Me" (Theme Song)	Miranda Cosgrove featuring Drake Bell	2:41
3.	"What's Next Baby"	iCarly cast	0:10
4.	"Stay My Baby"	Miranda Cosgrove	3:05
5.	"About Me?"	iCarly cast	0:08
6.	"About You Now"	Miranda Cosgrove	3:10
7.	"Build-A-Bra"	iCarly cast	0:11
8.	"Beautiful Girls" (Nickelodeon mix)	Sean Kingston	3:43
9.	"Sam's Second Toe"	iCarly cast	0:20
10.	"I Don't Wanna Be in Love"	Good Charlotte	4:04
11.	"Locked in the Closet"	iCarly cast	0:20
12.	"I Like That Girl"	Leon Thomas III	3:02
13.	"We Hated Your Girlfriend"	iCarly cast	0:14
14.	"Girlfriend featuring Lil' Mama" (Nickelodeon mix)	Avril Lavigne	3:05
15.	"Blueberry Belly Button"	iCarly cast	0:12
16.	"Freckles"	Natasha Bedingfield	3:45
17.	"Gas Station Snacks"	iCarly cast	0:19
18.	"Face in the Hall"	Naked Brothers Band	3:20
19.	"You Can't Do That!"	iCarly cast	0:20
20.	"Let's Hear It for the Boy"	The Stunners	3:00
21.	"Ten Things Boys Like"	iCarly cast	0:18
22.	"Thunder"	Boys Like Girls	3:56
23.	"Headphones Are Huge"	iCarly cast	0:27
24.	"Headphones On"	Miranda Cosgrove	3:03
25.	"Suckish Improv Game"	iCarly cast	0:28
26.	"Move"	Menudo	3:31
27.	"World's Fattest Priest"	iCarly cast	0:22
28.	"I'm Grown"	Tiffany Evans featuring Bow Wow	3:35
29.	"Back to One"	iCarly cast	0:13
Total length:			51:17

Fan pack edition
No.	Title	Artist	Length
29.	"The New Way"	iCarly cast	0:10
30.	"Leave It All to Me" (Jason Nevins remix)	Miranda Cosgrove featuring Drake Bell	2:26
31.	"So Hot It Hurts Me"	iCarly cast	0:16
32.	"Whatever My Love"	Mickey Drummond	3:29
33.	"Their Music Is Soooo Good"	iCarly cast	0:14
34.	"Take Me Back"	Backhouse Mike	2:19
35.	"Back to One"	iCarly cast	0:13
Total length:			1:00:11

Special fan pack and iTunes Store edition bonus track
No.	Title	Artist	Length
36.	"Leave It All to Me" (music video)	Miranda Cosgrove featuring Drake Bell	2:46
Total length:			1:02:57

== Charts ==
=== Weekly charts ===
Weekly chart performance for iCarly: Music from and Inspired by the Hit TV Show
Chart (2008–2009)	Peak position
Austrian Albums (Ö3 Austria)	34
Mexican Albums (Top 100 Mexico)	49
US Billboard 200	28
US Kid Albums (Billboard)	1
US Soundtrack Albums (Billboard)	2

=== Year-end charts ===
2008 year-end chart positions for iCarly: Music from and Inspired by the Hit TV Show
Chart (2008)	Position
US Kid Albums (Billboard)	22

2009 year-end chart positions for iCarly: Music from and Inspired by the Hit TV Show
Chart (2009)	Position
US Kid Albums (Billboard)	19
