= What's in It for Me =

What's in It for Me may refer to:

- What's in It for Me (John Berry song), 1993
- "What's in It for Me" (Amy Diamond song), 2005
- "What's in It for Me", a song by Faith Hill from Breathe
- "What's in It for Me", a song by The Walkmen from Bows + Arrows
- "What's in It for Me?", a song by Hoodoo Gurus from Purity of Essence
- What's in It for Me, a song by Karmin from Pulses
