= This Is Me Now (disambiguation) =

This Is Me... Now is a 2024 album by Jennifer Lopez,

This Is Me Now may also refer to:

- This Is Me Now (Amy Diamond album) (2005)
- This Is Me... Now: A Love Story, a 2024 musical film based on the album by Jennifer Lopez
