= About You Now =

2007 single by Sugababes

Single by Sugababes

from the album Change
- B-side: "Rocks"; "In Recline"
- Released: 24 September 2007
- Genre: Pop rock; electropop; dance-pop; electronic rock
- Length: 3:32 (album version); 3:09 (radio edit)
- Label: Island
- Songwriters: Lukasz Gottwald; Cathy Dennis
- Producer: Dr. Luke

Sugababes singles chronology
"Walk This Way" (2007)	"About You Now" (2007)	"Change" (2007)

Music video
- "About You Now" on YouTube

"About You Now" is a song by British girl group Sugababes from their fifth studio album, Change (2007). Written and produced by Dr. Luke along with Cathy Dennis and Steven Wolf, it was released on 24 September 2007 by Island Records as the lead single from the album, the first to feature Amelle Berrabah on all tracks. An uptempo pop track that combines heavy elements of pop rock and dance-pop, it infuses light electronic sounds. Lyrically, "About You Now" finds the protagonist thinking deeply over her relationship with her love interest from whom she parted.

The song was generally well received by music critics, who complimented its genre mixing production as well as its US pop influence. The song has been described as a "pop-electro-rock masterpiece" and the best Sugababes single in years. Upon its release, "About You Now" became the group's sixth UK number one hit and highest-charting single since 2005's "Push the Button". It remained atop the UK Singles Chart for four weeks. It also topped the airplay charts of Hungary and Poland and entered the top 10 in Austria, Germany, Ireland and Norway. It is Sugababes' highest-selling single to date, having sold more than 1 million units in the UK alone.

"About You Now" was nominated for a 2008 BRIT Award for Best British Single. In the 2009 edition of Guinness World Records, "About You Now" was listed as the "first track by a British pop act to top the singles chart solely on downloads". The song was also named as the "biggest chart mover to the number one position in the UK". In December 2009, it was revealed by BBC that "About You Now" was the UK's fifth most-played song of the decade (2000–09). An acoustic version of the song appears as a bonus track on the group's sixth studio album Catfights and Spotlights (2008).

== Background ==
"About You Now" was written by Lukasz Gottwald and Cathy Dennis, while production was helmed by the former under his pseudonym Dr. Luke with additional production from Steven Wolf. Keisha Buchanan from the group, described Luke as being 'rigid' with the song's American sound and that she had to "fight" for her ad-libs. Recorded at the Sarm West Studios in London, it was mixed by Kurt Read with further assistance from Aniela Gottwald. Bass, drums, and programming were handled by Luke, while guitars were led by Tina Kennedy and Luke. Additional keyboard contribution came from Eric Kupper. "About You Now" was described by PopJustice as a "proper pop song".

== Critical reception ==
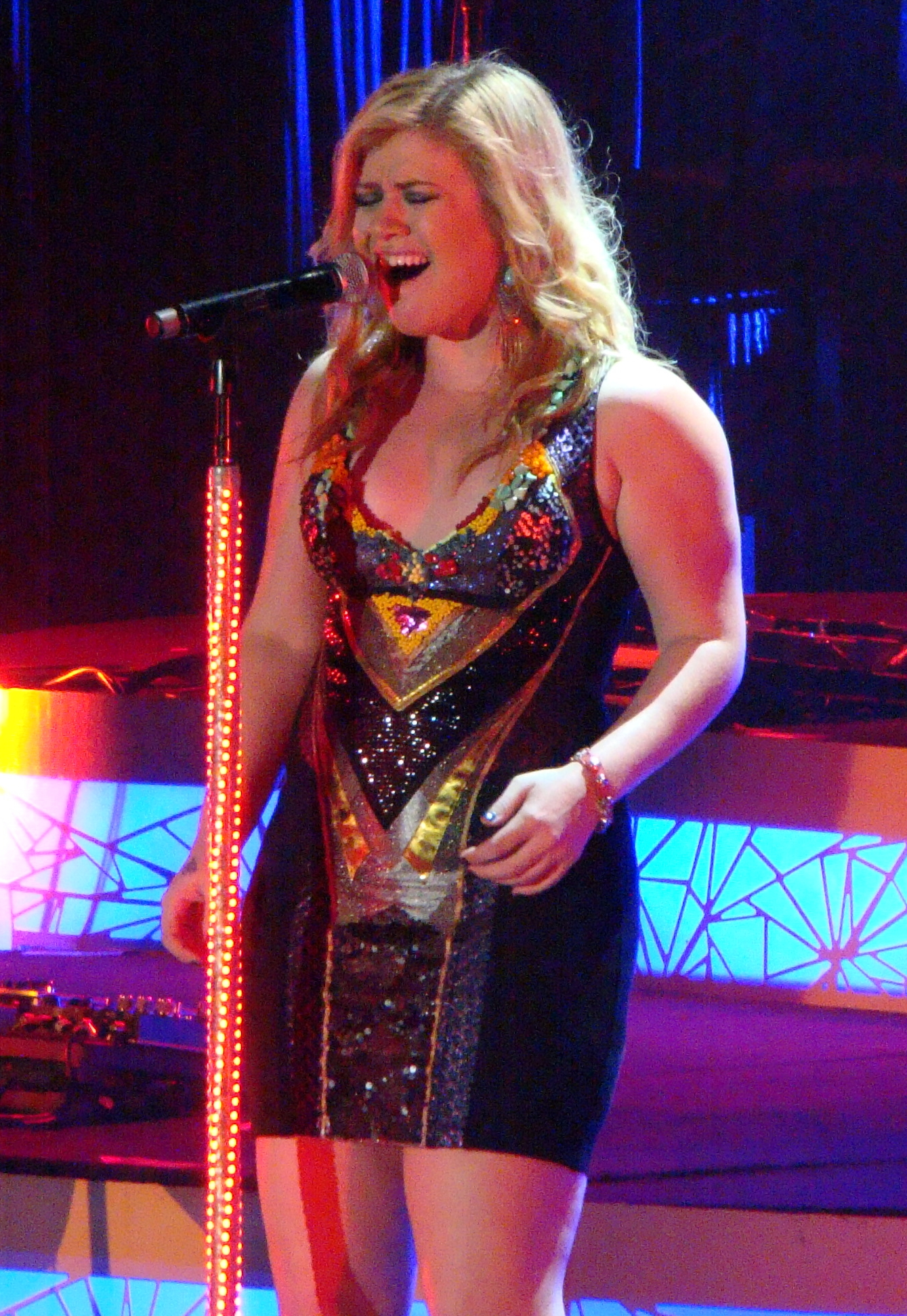
"About You Now" was compared to Kelly Clarkson's 2004 single "Since U Been Gone".

"About You Now" received generally favourable reviews from both music critics and fans alike. PopJustice reviewer Peter Robinson, who noted a similarity to Kelly Clarkson's 2004 single "Since U Been Gone" (also produced by Dr. Luke), described the song as a "pop-electro-rock masterpiece" and dubbed it "the best Sugababes single" since 2002's Round Round. He praised the song's unselfconsciousness and its "very pleased-to-be-exactly-what-it-is" attitude and noted that "it doesn't sound anything like what the Sugababes have done before but it is instantly recognisable as a Sugababes song". Alex Fletcher of Digital Spy summed it as "a pop dish fit for a king ... the lyrics are Waterman-esque perfect pop with the added spice of Sugababes kinkiness". He remarked that while "About You Now" lacked "the sauciness of a "Push the Button" or spiky attitude of "Hole in the Head", it makes up for it with robot voice effects, a pulsating electronic backbeat and a chorus so addictive that it should probably be taken away and labelled a class A drug".

Adam Webb, writing for Yahoo! Music, called the song a "classic Sugababes: ballsy, tuneful, sassy, slightly amateurish around the edges and generally better than 99.9 per cent of whatever else masquerades under the title of pop music in 2007". Though he noted a lack of edge, blunted by the departure of former band member Mutya Buena, Webb went on declaring it "a short, sharp jolt of classic, perfect pop", giving it seven stars out of ten. By contrast, IndieLondon gave a mixed reception to the song, writing that "it taps into a breezier sound that's designed to fizz with synths, guitars and perky beats. But it doesn't work as well as past hits and lacks the same crossover appeal of earlier cuts "Round, Round" or, most notably, "Freak like Me". Tom Young of BBC called "About You Now" a "fierce opening shot. It's one of their strongest tunes to date, and no surprise ... number one." In 2008, "About You Now" was nominated for a BRIT Award for Best British Single, eventually losing to Take That's "Shine".

== Chart performance ==
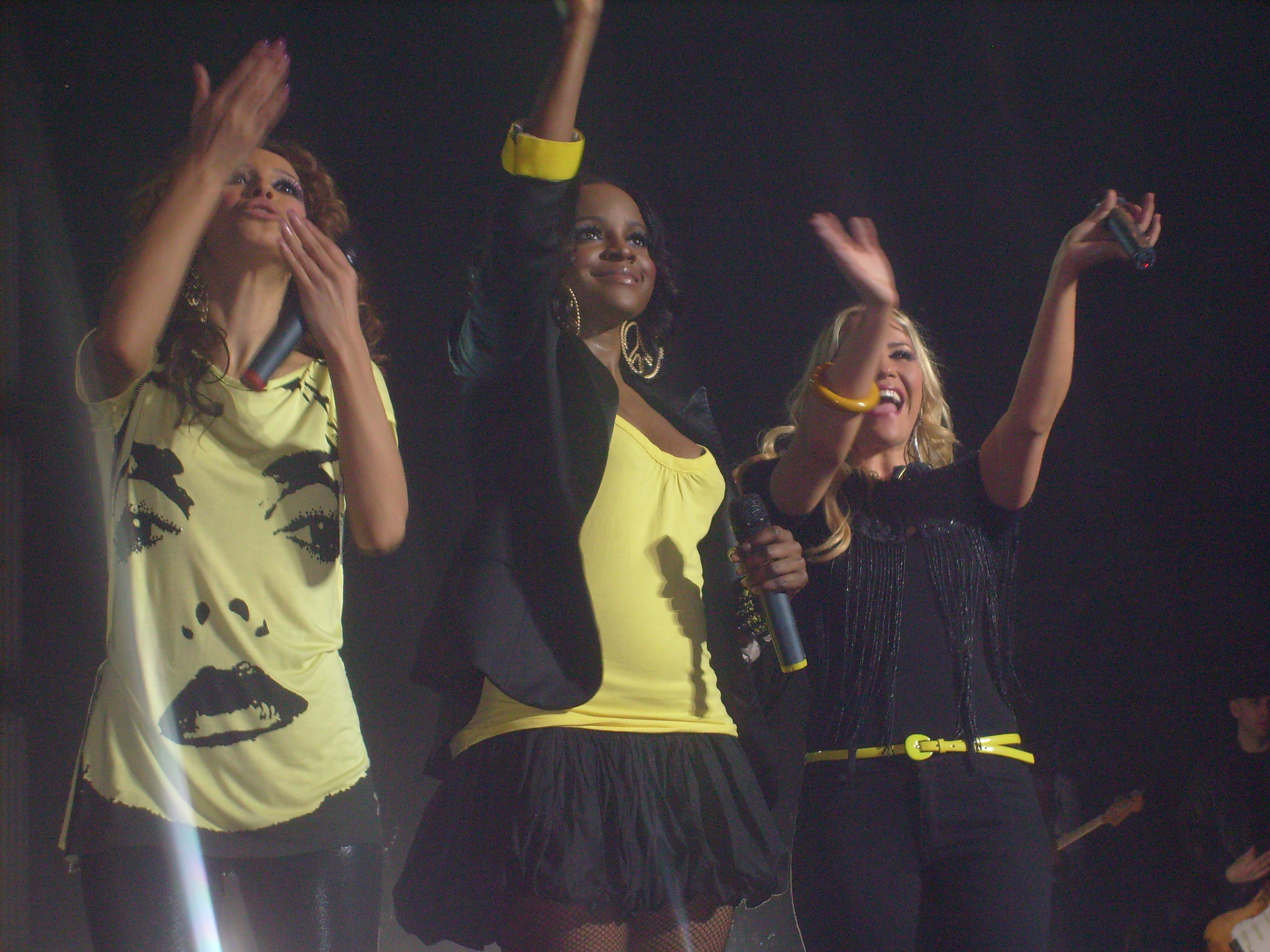
The Sugababes performing "About You Now" during their Change Tour in 2008.

"About You Now" made its first chart appearance in the United Kingdom on 17 September 2007 ― for the week ending dated 22 September 2007. It debuted at number thirty five on the UK Singles Chart after the release of a remix package for legal download. A week later, a major boost in downloads, induced by the official release of the digital single, helped catapulting the song to the top of the British charts. This feat made the Sugababes only the fourth act and first homegrown act to chart at number-one on download sales alone. "About You Now" became the band's sixth chart-topper and spent four weeks at number-one, surpassing the chart run of latter single. According to The Official Charts Company, it was ranked both Britain's sixth most-downloaded and sixth best-selling single of 2007. Having sold over 1.25 million copies as of October 2023, it ranks as their best-selling single.

In Ireland, "About You Now" debuted at number ten on the Irish Singles Chart on downloads alone. A week later, it climbed to number five with the physical release, and later peaked at number two for two weeks, becoming the Sugababes' fourth single to peak on particular position. In Austria, it debuted at number 13 on the Austrian Singles Chart where it peaked at number 4 in its third week, becoming the band's third biggest hit there after "Push the Button" and "Overload". "About You Now" saw similar success in Germany where it also peaked at number four on German Singles Chart, eventually becoming the Sugababes' third biggest hit there, again behind "Push the Button" and "Overload". On the Australian ARIA chart, the song peaked at number 57. In New Zealand—despite spending 21 weeks on the charts—it only managed to peak at number 18. On 13 July 2008, "About You Now" re-entered the UK Singles Chart at number 48, moving to number 34 the next week after being prominently featured in an episode of Hollyoaks. This version, recorded for Radio 1's Live Lounge, was used for the funeral of Max Cunningham.

== Music video ==
The music video for "About You Now" was directed by Marcus Adams and shot on 24 August 2007 at the Festival Hall in Waterloo in London, England. Although various pictures of the clip were leaked on the internet the following days, the full video made its world premiere via internet on 6 September. By 7 September 2007, the video had also debuted on music channels. The video is dedicated to Tim Royes, who directed the videos for the Sugababes's 2006 singles "Red Dress" and "Easy", and died in a traffic collision a month prior to the song's release. The Nokia 7500 mobile phone is used by the two actors in the video; the male actor has the black model whereas the female actor has the white model.

== Track listing ==
- UK CD1 / European CD Single
1. "About You Now" (Radio Edit) – 3:09
2. "Rocks" (Napster Live Session) – 3:03
- UK 7"
1. "About You Now" (Album Version) – 3:32
2. "About You Now" (Kissy Sell Out Remix) – 5:23
- UK CD2 / International CD Maxi
1. "About You Now" (Album Version) – 3:32
2. "About You Now" (Sticky 'Dirtypop' Remix) – 4:48
3. "About You Now" (Spencer & Hill Remix) – 5:51
4. "In Recline" – 3:26

== Personnel ==
Personnel are adapted from the liner notes of Change.

- Songwriting – Cathy Dennis, Lukasz Gottwald
- Production – Dr. Luke
  - Additional production – Steven Wolf
- Guitar – Lukasz Gottwald, Tina Kennedy
- Mixing – Kurt Read
- Mixing assistance – Aniela Gottwald
- Mastering – Chris Parmenidis

== Charts ==
=== Weekly charts ===
Chart (2007–2008)	Peak position
Australia (ARIA)	57
Austria (Ö3 Austria Top 40)	4
Belgium (Ultratip Bubbling Under Wallonia)	7
Belgium (Ultratop 50 Flanders)	28
Croatia International Airplay (HRT)	3
Czech Republic Airplay (ČNS IFPI)	1
Denmark (Tracklisten)	12
Denmark Airplay (Tracklisten)	2
European Hot 100 (Billboard)	3
Finland (Suomen virallinen lista)	19
France (SNEP)	19
Germany (GfK)	4
Germany (Airplay Chart)	1
Hungary (Rádiós Top 40)	1
Ireland (IRMA)	2
Netherlands (Dutch Top 40)	18
Netherlands (Single Top 100)	16
New Zealand (Recorded Music NZ)	18
Norway (VG-lista)	7
Poland (Airplay Chart)	1
Romania (Romanian Top 100)	35
Scottish Singles Sales (Official Charts)	1
Slovakia Airplay (ČNS IFPI)	2
Spain Airplay (Promusicae)	15
Sweden (Sverigetopplistan)	40
Switzerland (Schweizer Hitparade)	21
UK Singles (Official Charts)	1
UK Airplay (Music Week)	1
UK Hip Hop/R&B (Official Charts)	1

=== Year-end charts ===
Chart (2007)	Position
Austria (Ö3 Austria Top 40)	64
European Hot 100 (Billboard)	40
Germany (Media Control GfK)	61
Hungary (Rádiós Top 40)	92
UK Singles (OCC)	6

Chart (2008)	Position
European Hot 100 (Billboard)	49
Germany (Media Control GfK)	87
Hungary (Rádiós Top 40)	12
UK Singles (OCC)	99

=== Decade-end charts ===
Chart (2000–2009)	Position
UK Singles (OCC)	98

== Certifications and sales ==
Region	Certification	Certified units/sales
Denmark (IFPI Danmark)	Gold	7,500^{^}
France	—	21,055
Germany (BVMI)	Gold	150,000^{‡}
New Zealand (RMNZ)	Platinum	30,000^{‡}
United Kingdom (BPI)	2× Platinum	1,410,000
^{^} Shipments figures based on certification alone.^{‡} Sales+streaming figures based on certification alone.

== Release history ==
Region	Date	Format	Label
United Kingdom	24 September 2007	Digital download	Island Records
Ireland	28 September 2007	CD single	Island Records
United Kingdom	1 October 2007	CD single	Island Records
Australia	6 October 2007	CD single	Island Records
Germany	12 October 2007	CD single	Island Records
France	25 February 2008	CD single	Island Records
Spain	12 May 2008	Airplay	Island Records

== Miranda Cosgrove version ==
"About You Now"

Single by Miranda Cosgrove

from the EP About You Now
- Released: 28 January 2009
- Recorded: 2008
- Genre: Teen pop
- Length: 3:10
- Label: Nickelodeon; Columbia
- Songwriters: Lukasz Gottwald; Cathy Dennis
- Producers: Benny Blanco; Matt Beckley

Miranda Cosgrove singles chronology
"Leave It All to Me" (2007)	"About You Now" (2009)	"Kissin U" (2010)

Music video
- "About You Now" on YouTube

American actress Miranda Cosgrove covered "About You Now" for her debut extended play (EP), About You Now. It was released by Nickelodeon and Columbia Records as the EP's lead single on 28 January 2009. The original lyrics were slightly altered to be made more suitable to Cosgrove's younger audience. Cosgrove's version was promoted heavily on Nickelodeon, where the music video was played during commercial breaks. The Spider Remix of the single was also included in the EP.

=== Commercial performance ===
The song has become her highest-peaking song to date in the US, peaking at number 47 on the Billboard Hot 100. The song was heavily promoted by Cosgrove. During her first ever live performance, Cosgrove performed the song at the 2008 Macy's Thanksgiving Day Parade. On 3 February 2009, Cosgrove released an extended play, titled after the song. The EP, which was released to the iTunes Store, features a total of five songs – "About You Now", "FYI", and "Party Girl", and features remixes of "About You Now" and "Stay My Baby". Aside from this performance, Cosgrove also performed the song on Today on 6 September 2010, along with "Kissin U", and "BAM", both off of her debut studio album Sparks Fly released on 27 April 2010.

=== Music video ===
The music video, directed by Bille Woodruff premiered on Nickelodeon on 5 December 2008, following the premiere of Merry Christmas, Drake & Josh. It features Mexican-American Actor and singer Diego Boneta as her love interest. In the music video, Miranda is with her friends at the mall where, simultaneously, so is her ex–boyfriend. The best friends look at a necklace then go to a photo booth to take pictures. The pictures of two girls acting like they are dating remind Miranda about her break up with her ex-boyfriend, wherein she mistakenly accused him of cheating on her. They then go on an escalator and Miranda spots her ex. She texts him that she got it all wrong with him and he locates her and gives her the necklace that Miranda saw in the beginning of the video that she liked. They end up getting back together at the end of the video. The music video was one of the best selling videos on iTunes at the time of its release.

=== Charts ===
Chart (2009)	Peak position
US Billboard Hot 100	47

== Other versions ==
"About You Now"
The Saw Doctors version (2008)

The original version performed by the Sugababes was a massive hit throughout the UK and Europe. The popularity of the song compelled many artists from all different genres from all over Europe to do their own versions. Below is a list of some of the most notable covers.

- Rachel Tucker performed this song in the first week of live shows, on BBC1's I'd Do Anything.
- The Saw Doctors covered this song on The Podge and Rodge Show on 12 February 2008. Released as a charity single, with proceeds donated to cystic fibrosis charities, it topped the Irish Singles Chart in October 2008.
- The Courteeners performed an acoustic cover version during a BBC Radio 1 Live Lounge session. The song was later released on the commercial CD single for their song "No You Didn't, No You Don't".
- A cover of this song is the first single from Timo Räisänen's album ...And Then There Was Timo in 2008.
- Snow Patrol have performed a cover of this song at Mencap's Little Noise Sessions, live at the Union Chapel on 25 November 2007. The recording was officially released on the 2009 compilation Up to Now.
- N-Dubz did a cover of the song on their Uncle B tour. It was in a medley with "With You" by Chris Brown.
- The Twins, Nicola & Francine did a cover of the song during the semi-final round of Eurovision: Your Country Needs You, while competing to represent the UK at the Eurovision Song Contest 2009. Subsequently, Jade Ewen, who rose to stardom from the same show, would go to join the Sugababes in late 2009.
- In 2011, Kim Wilde covered the song for her album Snapshots.
- In 2014, Scottish folk-rock band Skipinnish included a cover of the song on their album "Western Ocean".
- In 2015, Shayne Ward covered the song for his album, Closer.
- In 2024, the Austrian band Manic Youth covered the song and released it as a single on 31 May.
