= 3022 =

2019 American science fiction film

- Promotional poster
- Directed by: John Suits
- Written by: Ryan Binaco
- Produced by: John Suits
- Starring: Omar Epps; Kate Walsh; Miranda Cosgrove; Angus Macfadyen
- Music by: The Album Leaf
- Production companies: Hideout Pictures; The Squid Farm; Title Media; Bondlt LLC; Natural Selection
- Distributed by: Saban Films
- Release date: November 22, 2019 (United States)
- Running time: 91 minutes
- Country: United States
- Language: English

3022 is a 2019 American science fiction film directed by John Suits and starring Omar Epps, Kate Walsh, Miranda Cosgrove, and Angus Macfadyen. The film is set on a space station in the future. The crew suffers traumatic stress and considers abandoning their mission after they observe what they believe to be the destruction of Earth. The film is shown as a series of flashbacks and flash-forwards.

== Plot ==
In 2190, the space station Pangea refuels ships bound for Earth's first space colony, Europa One. Rotating crews maintain Pangea in 10-year shifts. Four American astronauts arrive to begin their term: Captain John Laine, engineer Jackie Miller, doctor Richard Valin, and Lisa Brown.

In their first year, the crew interacts amicably, and Laine and Miller begin a romantic relationship. With each passing year, the crew drifts apart. By the fifth year, isolation takes a toll. Laine experiences night terrors, and Valin has stopped showering. Valin is forced to deem the crew mentally unfit to continue the mission. As the crew comes to terms with failing their mission, shockwaves from a massive explosion damage Pangea. Laine regains consciousness and finds Miller, who informs him Brown was seriously injured. Valin is unresponsive and in shock. The crew repeatedly tries to contact Earth but, after 62 hours, receives no response. Pangea eventually locates an asteroid field where Earth once was, implying that the planet was destroyed.

Brown succumbs to her injuries. Valin is convinced the Earth was destroyed. Miller suggests using the escape pod to search for survivors, namely her daughter, but Valin notes there are not enough supplies to return to Pangea if Earth is truly gone. Laine suggests traveling to Europa instead, which Valin despondently rejects. Miller, who refuses to believe her daughter is gone, attempts to board the escape pod herself. The pod malfunctions; Laine saves Miller, but they lose the pod.

Three months pass. Pangea's life support systems decays to 55%, Valin is talking to himself regularly, and Miller self-medicates with sedatives. Laine asks Miller to help him devise a survival plan. The two decide to separate Pangea's two stations with a controlled explosion, allowing their oxygen supplies to replenish adequately. Valin sinks into defeatist nihilism and sees no point to their plan.

Laine is abruptly awakened by the ship's alarm to find Valin floating away from Pangea untethered. Valin says he has accepted his fate but panics at the emptiness of space. Laine fails to rescue Valin. As Miller proposes they consume suicide pills, she sees a space shuttle float by. Laine boards the shuttle and recovers three unconscious, malnourished astronauts. Captain Diane Ures is the first to awaken. She explains her team comprises French astronauts, Vincent and Thomas. They, and two Americans, were training on the International Space Station when the explosion destroyed the station and forced them to head for Pangea, a three-month trip. The two American crew members died, which allowed them to survive on limited supplies.

The presence of survivors renews the spirits of both crews, and they celebrate together. However, Miller calculates the addition of more crew members will deplete Pangea's life support systems within one month instead of three years. She insists on traveling back to Earth in the ISS shuttle until Diane admits she saw Earth explode violently while receiving a final transmission saying, "What have we done? Do not return. I repeat, do not return. Go to Europa."

Vincent and Thomas express hostility towards the Pangea crew. Diane tells Laine her team discovered the lack of remaining life support, but she remains diplomatic. Vincent confesses to murdering his two American colleagues to ensure his own survival. He and Thomas stage a mutiny, kill Diane, then attack Laine and Miller. Laine is stabbed, and the two French astronauts escape. Miller chases Thomas into Station Two and incapacitates him when he hesitates. Vincent and Laine scuffle in Station One over the station controls. Vincent overpowers Laine and triggers an explosion, breaking Pangea into two halves. Laine opens the outer hatch, expelling Vincent into space.

Miller, still trapped in Station Two, contacts Laine over the intercom. The explosion damaged the shuttle, leaving Laine unable to travel to Miller in time. As Miller drifts beyond communications range, Laine promises her that he will find her one day. In 2198, Laine lives alone, appearing disheveled and suffering from hallucinations yet scanning space tirelessly. He locates the missing station on Day 3022. In a log entry, he explains that he finally understands why Miller always reserved hope for her loved ones despite understanding the reality. With the shuttle now repaired, he boards Station Two unsure if Miller is still alive. He finds Miller slumped in a makeshift quarters, weakened but alive.

== Cast ==
- Omar Epps as John Laine
- Kate Walsh as Jackie Miller
- Miranda Cosgrove as Lisa Brown
- Angus Macfadyen as Richard Valin
- Enver Gjokaj as Vincent Bernard
- Haaz Sleiman as Thomas Dahan
- Jorja Fox as Diane Ures
- Sara Tomko as Pangea (Voice)

== Reception ==
American magazine The Hollywood Reporter commented on the special effects positively despite the film's limited budget: "Considering the obvious budget limitations, the special effects and physical aspects of the production are convincing.

In 2020, the film received renewed interest during the COVID-19 pandemic, becoming the ninth-most-popular overall title on Netflix in March 2020.
