= ICarly: iSoundtrack II =

iCarly: iSoundtrack II

Soundtrack album by Various artists
- Released: January 24, 2012
- Genres: Pop; country
- Length: 47:57
- Labels: Nickelodeon; Columbia
- Producer: Various

iCarly: iSoundtrack II is a soundtrack album of the Nickelodeon television series iCarly and is the sequel to the 2008 soundtrack album of the same name. It was released on January 24, 2012.

It features Miranda Cosgrove's single "Dancing Crazy" from her EP High Maintenance, and Jennette McCurdy's single "Generation Love" from her self-titled debut album, it also features a cover of Diddy – Dirty Money's "Coming Home" performed by the cast.

== Track listing ==
No.	Title	Writer(s)	Artist	Length
1.	"Dancing Crazy"	Shellback, Max Martin, Avril Lavigne	Miranda Cosgrove	3:40
2.	"Million Dollars"	Andrew Bolooki, Jacob Kasher Hindlin, Philip Paul Shaouy, Emily Wright	Miranda Cosgrove	3:35
3.	"Coming Home"	Shawn Carter, Jermaine Cole, Alexander Grant, Holly Hafermann	iCarly cast	2:51
4.	"Generation Love"	Tom Douglas, Heather Morgan, Ross Copperman	Jennette McCurdy	3:37
5.	"Dynamite"	Lukasz Gottwald, Martin, Benjamin Levin, Bonnie McKee	Taio Cruz	3:23
6.	"All Kinds of Wrong"	Gottwald, Claude Kelly, Emily Wright	Miranda Cosgrove	3:35
7.	"That's Not My Name"	Julian De Martino, Katie White	The Ting Tings	5:11
8.	"Hot n Cold"	Katy Perry, Gottwald, Martin	Katy Perry	3:40
9.	"Blow"	Kesha, Klas Åhlund, Gottwald, Allan Grigg, Levin, Martin	Kesha	3:40
10.	"Shakespeare" (Acoustic Mix)	Jason Brett Levine, Susan Florea Cagle	Miranda Cosgrove	3:40
11.	"I Will Be"	Gottwald, Lavigne, Martin	Leona Lewis	3:59
12.	"I'm Not Gonna Teach Your Boyfriend How to Dance with You"	Black Kids	Black Kids	3:38
13.	"Leave It All to Me" (Billboard Remix)	Michael Corcoran	Miranda Cosgrove featuring Drake Bell	3:28

== Charts ==
Chart performance for iCarly: iSoundtrack II
Chart (2012)	Peak position
US Billboard 200	157
US Kid Albums (Billboard)	3
US Soundtrack Albums (Billboard)	6
