= Stay My Baby =

2007 single by Amy Diamond

Single by Amy Diamond

from the album Music in Motion
- Released: 21 November 2007
- Recorded: 2007
- Length: 3:05
- Label: Bonnier Amigo
- Songwriter(s): Max Martin; Tommy Tysper; Savan Kotecha
- Producer(s): Max Martin; Tommy Tysper

Amy Diamond singles chronology
"Is It Love?" (2007)	"Stay My Baby" (2007)	"Thank You" (2008)

"Stay My Baby" is a song written by Max Martin, Tommy Tysper and Savan Kotecha as the second single from Amy Diamond's third studio album Music in Motion (2007). Produced by Martin and Tysper, the song was written for Diamond by special request from her management and released 21 November 2007. It reached number 4 on the Swedish Singles Top 60 chart. The song instrumental was included on the re-release of the album: Music in Motion/Gold Edition (2008).

== Music video ==
The music video was recorded in Stockholm city, Sweden, released on 1 December 2007.

== Charts ==
Song	Position
Swedish Singles Chart	4

== Miranda Cosgrove version ==
"Stay My Baby"

Promotional single by Miranda Cosgrove

from the album iCarly
- Released: 5 June 2008
- Recorded: 2008
- Genre: Pop rock
- Length: 3:05
- Label: Nickelodeon; Columbia
- Songwriter(s): Max Martin; Tommy Tysper; Savan Kotecha
- Producer(s): Max Martin; Tommy Tysper

Music video
- "Stay My Baby" on YouTube

A cover version of the song by iCarly star Miranda Cosgrove was released as a promotional single and was included on the iCarly soundtrack. A remix version of the song was also included in her debut EP About You Now A music video was also filmed and was directed by Jesse Dylan.

=== Background ===
Cosgrove's musical career first began with her recording the theme song of the Nickelodeon sitcom iCarly called "Leave It All to Me", on which Cosgrove starred as the title character on the show. The song features her former Drake & Josh castmate Drake Bell, and was written by Michael Corcoran, one of Bell's band members. Following the success of iCarly, Columbia Records released a soundtrack album of the show on June 10, 2008. The soundtrack album included "Leave It All to Me", "Stay My Baby", "About You Now" and "Headphones On".

=== Music video ===
The music video premiered on Nickelodeon and was directed by Jesse Dylan. The music video features Nolan Gerard Funk. In the video, Cosgrove and her love interest write a song together, calls her band, and her friends and perform the song. At the end, Cosgrove walks off with her love interest.
