= It Can Only Get Better =

2006 song by Amy Diamond

Single by Amy Diamond

from the album Still Me Still Now
- Released: 2006
- Recorded: 2006
- Genre: Pop
- Songwriters: Gustav Jonsson, Tommy Tysper, Marcus Sepehrmanesh

Music video
- "It Can Only Get Better" on YouTube

"It Can Only Get Better" is an English language song by Swedish singer Amy Diamond. It was written by Gustav Jonsson, Tommy Tysper and Marcus Sepehrmanesh and appears in Amy Diamond's second album Still Me Still Now. The song was released by Amy Diamond as a single reaching number 19 in Sverigetopplistan, the Swedish Singles Chart at end of 2006 (week 50 chart).

== Charts ==
Chart (2006)	Peak position
Swedish Singles Chart	19

== Charice version ==
"It Can Only Get Better"

Single by Charice

from the album Charice (EP)
- Released: June 2009
- Recorded: 2008
- Genre: Pop
- Label: Star
- Songwriters: Gustav Jonsson; Tommy Tysper; Marcus Sepehrmanesh

Charice singles chronology
"It Can Only Get Better" (2009)	"Always You" (2009)

Music video
- "It Can Only Get Better" on YouTube

The song was covered by Filipino singer Charice, now known as Jake Zyrus, for his self-titled extended play. It was then released as his first commercial single.

== See also ==
- "Era stupendo"
