= This Is Me Now (Amy Diamond album) =

2005 album by Amy Diamond

Studio album by Amy Diamond
- Released: 18 May 2005
- Genre: Pop
- Label: Bonnier Amigo Music Group
- Producers: Tysper, Grizzly, Mack

Amy Diamond chronology
This Is Me Now (2005)	Still Me Still Now (2006)

Singles from This Is Me Now
- 1. "What's in It for Me" Released: March 2005; 2. "Welcome to the City" Released: 2005; 3. "Champion" Released: 2005; 4. "Shooting Star" Released: 2006

This Is Me Now is Swedish singer Amy Diamond's first studio album. It was released on 18 May 2005 by Bonnier Amigo Music Group. Four singles were released from the album, the most successful being "What's in It for Me", which topped the charts in Sweden and Norway and peaked within the top 10 in Denmark and Finland. "Welcome to the City" also experienced success in Sweden, reaching number three, but follow-ups "Champion" and "Shooting Star" failed to chart.

== Track listing ==
1. "Hello!"
2. "What's in It for Me"
3. "Welcome to the City"
4. "Another Day"
5. "One of the Ones"
6. "Shooting Star"
7. "Champion"
8. "Go!"
9. "If I Ain't Got You (Live)"
10. "Tomorrow (Annie's Song)"
11. "What's in It for Me (Video)"

== Track listing (international version) ==
1. "Hello!"
2. "What's in It for Me"
3. "Welcome to the City"
4. "Another Day"
5. "Don't Lose Any Sleep over You"
6. "Shooting Star"
7. "All the Money in the World"
8. "Champion"
9. "Go!"
10. "If I Ain't Got You (Live)"
11. "One of the Ones"
12. "What's in It for Me (Glasperlenspieler Mix)"
13. "What's in It for Me (New Video)"

== Charts ==
=== Weekly charts ===
Chart (2005)	Peak position
Danish Albums (Hitlisten)	22
Finnish Albums (Suomen virallinen lista)	21
Norwegian Albums (VG-lista)	19
Swedish Albums (Sverigetopplistan)	2

=== Year-end charts ===
Chart (2005)	Position
Swedish Albums (Sverigetopplistan)	9

== Certifications ==
Region	Certification	Certified units/sales
Sweden (GLF)	Platinum	60,000^{^}
^{^} Shipments figures based on certification alone.
