= Still Me Still Now =

Studio album by Amy Diamond
- Released: 24 May 2006
- Recorded: 2006
- Genre: Pop
- Label: Bonnier Amigo Music Group
- Producer: Tysper, Grizzly, Mack

Amy Diamond chronology
This Is Me Now (2005)	Still Me Still Now (2006)	Music in Motion (2007)

Still Me Still Now is Amy Diamond's second studio album. It was released on 24 May 2006 by Bonnier Amigo Music Group.

== Track listing ==
1. "Big Guns"
2. "Don't Cry Your Heart Out"
3. "My Name is Love"
4. "That's Life"
5. "All the Money In the World"
6. "Don't Lose Any Sleep Over You"
7. "Diamonds"
8. "Life's What You Make It"
9. "No Regrets"
10. "It Can Only Get Better"

== Charts ==
=== Weekly charts ===
Chart (2006)	Peak position
Danish Albums (Hitlisten)	25
Finnish Albums (Suomen virallinen lista)	34
Swedish Albums (Sverigetopplistan)	2

=== Year-end charts ===
Chart (2006)	Position
Swedish Albums (Sverigetopplistan)	59

== Certifications ==
Region	Certification	Certified units/sales
Sweden (GLF)	Gold	30,000^{^}
^{^} Shipments figures based on certification alone.
