= What's in It for Me (Amy Diamond song) =

2005 single by Amy Diamond

- Swedish cover artwork

Single by Amy Diamond

from the album This Is Me Now
- Released: March 2005
- Studio: Ten (Stockholm, Sweden)
- Genre: Pop-reggae
- Length: 3:16
- Label: Bonnier; Warner Music International
- Songwriters: Grizzly; Tommy Tysper; Mack
- Producers: Grizzly; Tommy Tysper

Amy Diamond singles chronology
"What's in It for Me" (2005)	"Welcome to the City" (2005)

"What's in It for Me" is a song by Swedish singer and actress Amy Deasismont, released under her stage name, Amy Diamond. The song was written by Grizzly, Tommy Typser, and Mack and was produced by the former two. Deasismont recorded the song when she was 12 years old, after winning a national radio talent competition. It was included on her first studio album, This Is Me Now, as the second track. The single was released in Scandinavia in March 2005, eventually topping the charts of Sweden and Norway. In September 2005, it was released in continental Europe, where it topped the Polish Airplay Chart and also charted in Germany and the Netherlands. The song remains Deasismont's biggest hit.

== Critical reception ==
In a review of the song's parent album on AllMusic, K. Ross Hoffman wrote that the most unsettling line in the song was "You can't have this candy / And keep one foot outside the door", noting Amy Deasismont's young age. However, he called the song one of the album's highlights, citing Deasismont's "sassy" delivery and describing it as "swaggering" and "utterly infectious". He went on to write, "Once you get used to the idea that her character in this song is just that — a role she's playing, like the hammy, scene-stealing kid actor she was brought up to be — you have to admit that she's got the chops to give a fully convincing performance".

== Chart performance ==
"What's in It for Me" is Deasismont's biggest hit in Sweden and abroad. The song first appeared on the Swedish Singles Chart on 24 February 2005 at number 10, charting on airplay alone. In March, it was officially released as a single in Sweden and the rest of Scandinavia. The song spent all five chart weeks of March fluctuating between numbers two and five on the Swedish chart, then moved up to number one on 7 April, staying there for three weeks in total. It dropped to number two on 28 April, then slowly moved down the listing until leaving the top 60 for the final time on 1 December. At the end of the year, the single came in at number three on Sweden's year-end chart, and it was certified platinum by the Swedish Recording Industry Association (GLF) on 15 June 2005 for shipping over 20,000 copies.

In neighbouring Norway, the song also became a number-one hit, debuting at number 15 on the 24th chart week of 2005 and climbing to number one on weeks 35 and 37, corresponding to August and September. It stayed on the Norwegian chart for a total of 25 weeks. In Finland, the track charted for seven weeks, peaking at number 10 on chart week 36. It also reached the top 10 in Denmark, taking 20 weeks to peak at number three on 13 January 2006, and was certified gold by IFPI for shipments exceeding 4,000 units. Following its release in continental Europe on 19 September 2005, it appeared on the German Singles Chart at number 36, its peak, and logged nine weeks in the top 100. On 12 November, it debuted on the Dutch Single Top 100 listing at number 45, rose to its peak of number 42 the next week, then remained on the chart for another four weeks.

== Track listings ==
European CD single

1. "What's in It for Me" – 3:16
2. "What's in It for Me" (karaoke mix) – 3:14

German maxi-CD single

1. "What's in It for Me" (original single mix) – 3:16
2. "What's in It for Me" (Glasperlenspieler mix) – 3:54
3. "What's in It for Me" (extended mix) – 4:38
4. "What's in It for Me" (album version) – 3:40
5. "What's in It for Me" (enhanced video) – 3:20

== Credits and personnel ==
Credits are adapted from the European CD single liner notes.

Studios

- Recorded at Ten Studios (Stockholm, Sweden)
- Mixed at Megaphone and Ten Studio
- Mastered at Masters of Audio (Stockholm, Sweden)

Personnel

- Amy Diamond – vocals
- Mack – writing
- Grizzly – writing, production, mixing
- Tommy Tysper – writing, production, mixing
- Henrik – mastering

== Charts ==
=== Weekly charts ===
Chart (2005–2006)	Peak position
Denmark (Tracklisten)	3
Finland (Suomen virallinen lista)	10
Germany (GfK)	36
Netherlands (Single Top 100)	42
Norway (VG-lista)	1
Poland (Polish Airplay Chart)	1
Sweden (Sverigetopplistan)	1

=== Year-end charts ===
Chart (2005)	Position
Sweden (Hitlistan)	3

== Certifications ==
Region	Certification	Certified units/sales
Denmark (IFPI Danmark)	Gold	4,000^{^}
Sweden (GLF)	Platinum	20,000^{^}
^{^} Shipments figures based on certification alone.
