= Leave It All to Me =

Single by Miranda Cosgrove featuring Drake Bell

from the album iCarly
- Released: December 18, 2007
- Genre: Pop; pop-punk; synth-pop
- Length: 2:42
- Label: Nickelodeon; Columbia
- Songwriter: Michael Corcoran
- Producer: Michael Corcoran

Miranda Cosgrove singles chronology
| "Leave It All to Me" (2007) | "About You Now" (2009) |

Drake Bell singles chronology
| "Makes Me Happy" (2007) | "Leave It All to Me" (2007) | "Terrific" (2011) |

Music video
- "Leave It All to Me" on YouTube

"Leave It All to Me" is the debut single by American actress and singer Miranda Cosgrove featuring American actor and musician Drake Bell. The song served as the theme song for the Nickelodeon show iCarly and its 2021 revival. It was released as a single on December 18, 2007, by Nickelodeon Records and Columbia Records, and later added to the soundtrack album iCarly (2008). A mashup with the Victorious theme song "Make It Shine" was released as "Leave It All to Shine" in June 2011, followed by a remix by Billboard on the soundtrack album iCarly: iSoundtrack II (2012).

The song was written, produced, and mixed by Michael Corcoran. An upbeat pop, pop-punk, and synth-pop song, it has been described by critics as promoting tenacity and determination. It peaked at number 100 on the US Billboard Hot 100 and number 83 on the US Pop 100 chart. A music video for the song was released in 2008 and was later uploaded to Cosgrove's YouTube channel on September 28, 2010. Cosgrove performed "Leave It All to Me" during her debut solo tour, the Dancing Crazy Tour in 2011.

== Background and release ==
The revival's opening sequence

American actress Miranda Cosgrove, who starred as Carly Shay on the Nickelodeon television show iCarly, was asked by the show's producers to record a theme song for the series at age thirteen. Although she had not previously recorded a song, she agreed to perform the track. She later expressed interest in performing additional music. The track was written, produced, and mixed by Michael Corcoran. It was subsequently selected as the series' theme song.

"Leave It All to Me" was released as a single on December 18, 2007, through Nickelodeon Records and Columbia Records. It was then released as the second track on the soundtrack album iCarly on June 10, 2008. A mashup combining "Leave It All to Me" and "Make It Shine", the theme song for Victorious, was released on June 10, 2011, under the title "Leave It All to Shine". A remix by Canadian music producer Billboard appeared on the soundtrack album iCarly: iSoundtrack II on January 24, 2012.

In June 2021, Cosgrove told Seventeen that "Leave It All to Me" would serve as the theme song for the 2021 iCarly revival. Cosgrove said that although a different song and rerecording of the theme had initially been considered for the revival, the original was ultimately retained after she advocated for keeping the theme song unchanged.

== Music and lyrics ==
"Leave It All to Me"
The TV version of "Leave It All to Me". The lyrics address themes of not giving up and trying one's best.

"Leave It All to Me" features Cosgrove on lead vocals and Drake Bell—her co-star from Drake & Josh—on background vocals and lead guitar. Heidi Kotansky of Common Sense Media described Bell's vocals on the track as "muted backup accompaniment that can't really be heard throughout most of the song". She added that Cosgrove's vocals were "surprisingly decent and mature, perhaps a bit altered".

The track is an upbeat pop, pop-punk, and synth-pop song. "Leave It All to Me" is driven by a steady drumbeat, with its bridge featuring an electric guitar riff and bells that transition into the chorus. The track concludes with Cosgrove repeatedly singing, "Leave it all to me, just leave it all to me." Critics described the lyrics as promoting self-reliance and perseverance, citing lines such as: "Live life, breathe air/I know somehow we're gonna get there, and feel so wonderful."

== Critical reception ==
Professional ratings
Review scores
| Source | Rating |
|---|---|
| Common Sense Media | 3/5 stars |
| The Ringer | 6/10 |

Critical reception for "Leave It All to Me" was mixed to positive. Kotansky described the song as "positive" and "peppy", noting that it was "very easy to get stuck in your head", though she added that it was "not the most innovative or talented pop single". Writing for The Ringer, Aric Jenkins offered a similar critique, acknowledging that while he initially "detested" the opening seconds of the track, he stated the song's "deceptively catchy" arrangement and "Beach Boys–esque harmonizing" ultimately redeemed it. In a retrospective commentary for Bustle, Jake Viswanath highlighted Bell's background vocals, noting how they added to the track's appeal. Similarly, Danny Mills of Collider praised the track's hook and lyrics, calling it "catchy and upbeat". P. Claire Dodson of Teen Vogue and Tamara Fuentes of Seventeen remarked on the song's continued memorability and resonance with audiences.

=== Commercial performance ===
"Leave It All to Me" debuted and peaked at number 100 on the US Billboard Hot 100 chart dated January 12, 2008. It gave Cosgrove and Bell their first Hot 100 hit in the United States. The song lasted for one week on the chart. The single also charted at number 83 on the US Pop 100 chart dated January 19, 2008.

== Promotion and impact ==
The official music video for "Leave It All to Me" was released in 2008 and was later uploaded to Cosgrove's YouTube channel on September 28, 2010. Cosgrove performed the track during her first headlining tour, the Dancing Crazy Tour, in 2011, with Bell joining her onstage at Club Nokia, where his appearance drew cheers from the audience. In January 2017, Bell shared a throwback video of himself and Cosgrove dancing to the song and said he hoped she would return to recording music following her hiatus to attend the University of Southern California.

The track regained attention in June 2021 when American rapper DDG released a freestyle sampling the track, using its introduction and part of Cosgrove's opening verse. In 2022, American actor and DJ Matt Bennett performed the track during his DJ sets. In July 2023, the song drew renewed media coverage during the 2023 SAG-AFTRA strike when Cosgrove, Nathan Kress, and Jerry Trainor joined Jaidyn Triplett on a picket line as she sang the track.

== Credits and personnel ==
Credits were adapted from Apple Music and Collider.

- Miranda Cosgrove – vocals
- Drake Bell – background vocals, lead guitar
- Michael Corcoran – writer, producer, mixing engineer

== Charts ==
Weekly chart performance
| Chart (2008) | Peak position |
|---|---|
| US Billboard Hot 100 | 100 |
| US Pop 100 (Billboard) | 83 |
