= Amy Deasismont =

Swedish singer (born 1992)

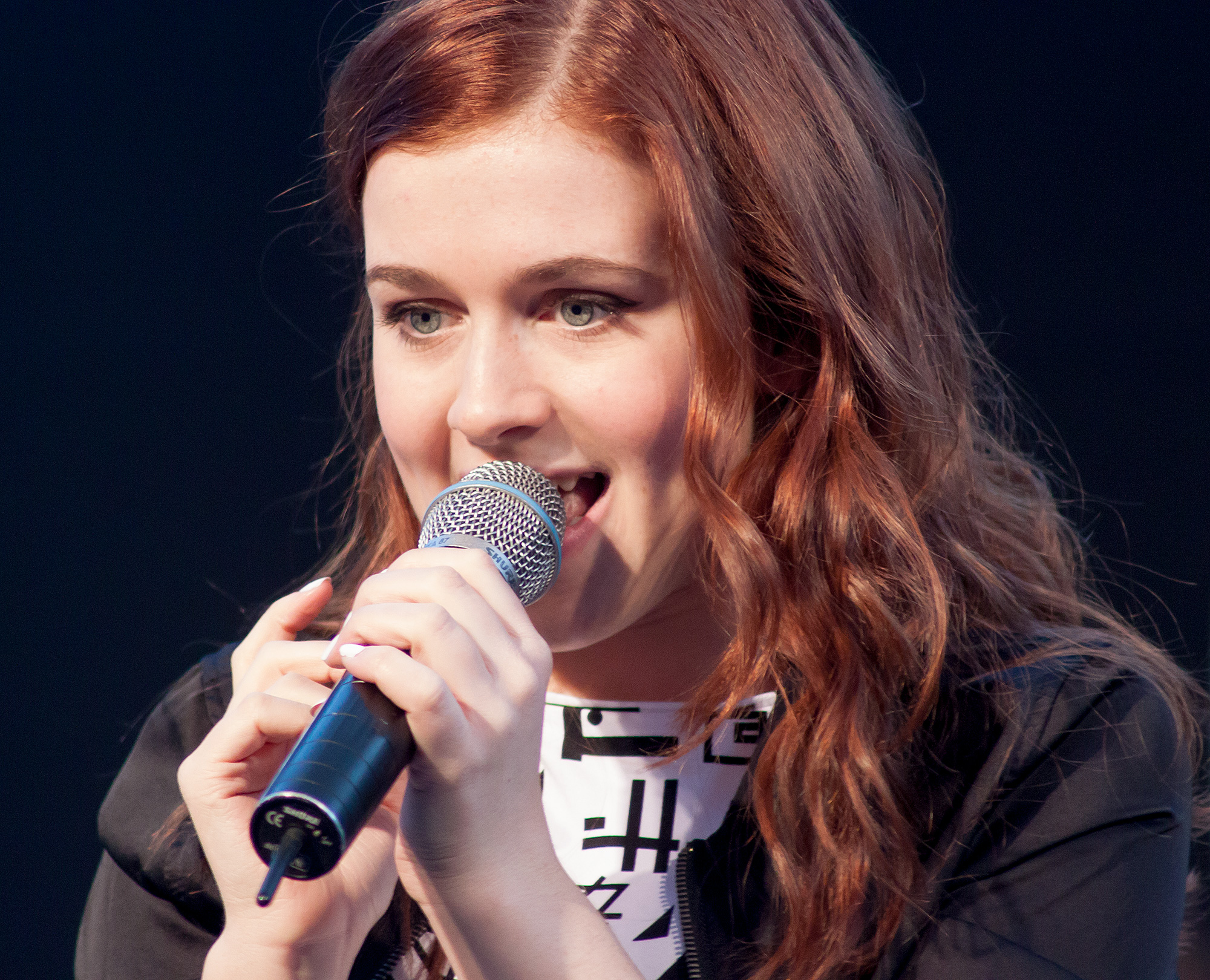
- Deasismont singing in Uddevalla, Sweden in 2013
- Born: Amy Linnéa Deasismont; 15 April 1992 (age 34); Norrköping, Sweden
- Occupations: Actress; screenwriter; director; singer
- Years active: 2003–present
- Musical career
- Genres: Pop; Indie pop
- Instrument: Vocals
- Labels: Bonnier Amigo Music Group; Dmd Music AB; Hurdy Gurdy Noise

Amy Linnéa Deasismont (born 15 April 1992), previously known under the stage name Amy Diamond, is a Swedish actress, screenwriter, director, and singer.

She is known for her single "What's in It for Me". The song was a 2005 hit in Sweden, Denmark, Norway, and Finland. It was the most-played song in Poland that year; it remained in the top ten for four months. She has released six studio albums.

To date, her biggest hits have been "What's in It For Me", "Welcome To The City", "Don't Cry Your Heart Out", "It Can Only Get Better", "Stay My Baby", "Is It Love", "Up" and "Thank You". She is also the youngest person in Sweden to have released a greatest hits album.

As an actress, she has appeared in 2015's My Skinny Sister. She is also known for her roles in TV series such as The Chosen Ones, Thunder in My Heart, Ligga, and Knutby.

== Early life ==
Deasismont was born in Norrköping, Sweden as Amy Linnéa Deasismont, the second child of an English father, Lee, and a Swedish mother, Chrisbeth. When she was ten months old, the family moved to the UK. The family moved back to Sweden when she was four-and-a-half years old, this time to Jönköping. She has an older sister, Danielle; three younger sisters Lisa, Holly, and Lily; and a younger brother, Charlie.

Deasismont started figure skating at age six and won multiple gold medals. She practiced six times a week before embarking on her singing career. She went to a dance and theater school called Blandgodis, and participated in theater and TV productions which gave her experience in public performing. She also appeared in a small television role on the show De drabbade.

== Music career ==
Deasismont has loved singing since she was one year old. One of her first public performances was at the age seven on the talent show Småstjärnorna. She dressed as Belinda Carlisle and lip synced to "Heaven is a Place on Earth", finishing third in the competition. In 2004, she participated in talent competitions such as Minimelodifestivalen in Jönköping and Swedish TV4's Super Troupers, winning most of them. On Mix Megapol Summer Idol she won the main prize: to record a song in a real studio. During recording, she was offered a commercial recording contract. Soon after, she recorded her debut single "What's in It for Me". Markus Sepehrmanesh, one of the songwriters for her albums, said in an interview that she sang perfectly. "What's in It for Me" was recorded in ninety minutes and the single was released the following February.

=== Success as a singer ===
"What's in It for Me" was a commercial success, although some Swedish TV stations refused to show the music video, arguing that Deasismont was too young (turned 13 soon after the release) for the song's theme about romantic relationships. Deasismont, though, did not see the theme as a romantic relationship – in her eyes it was relationships between friends. Nevertheless, the song received extensive radio airplay while she simultaneously went on tour with Elin Lanto. "What's in It for Me" reached number one on the Swedish singles chart in March and eventually went platinum.

Before long, she appeared on Swedish TV4 and used her artist name for the first time. Although she sang to a pre-recorded backing track in the studio, on the program she sang her single and Alicia Keys' song "If I Ain't Got You" while accompanied by a live band. The band included a drummer, guitarist, bassist, background singer and a keyboard player, who also sang backgrounds.

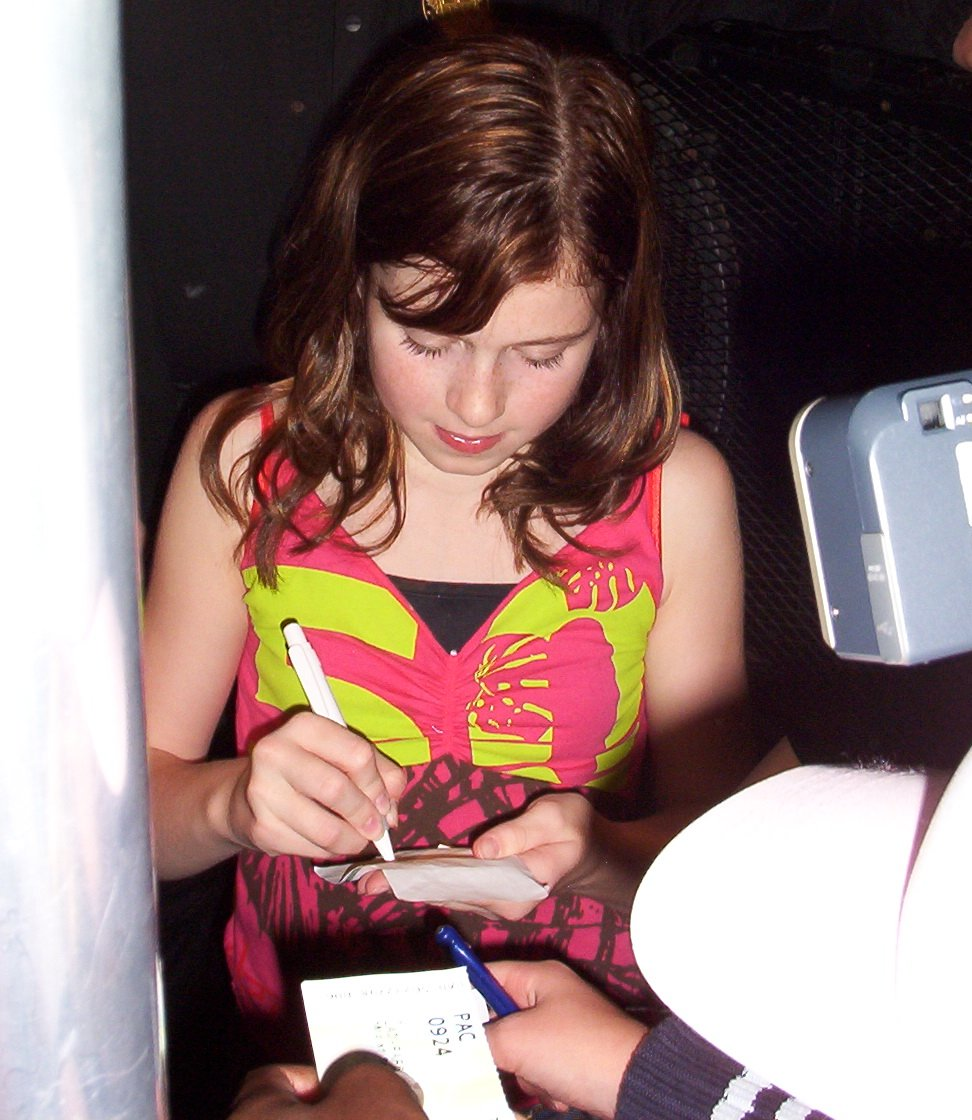
Amy Diamond giving autographs in Kalmar, Sweden in 2005

Due to the success of the single, a full album was commissioned, and This Is Me Now was released in May 2005. The album sold more than 150,000 copies, which was triple the requirement for gold record certification in Sweden at the time. The success led to television appearances, such as on the weekly chart show Trackslistan and on the children's competition show Vi i femman. By the end of 2005, she had appeared live on more than 20 television shows. A concert tour in Sweden was organized for her in the summer, and some of the shows were also televised.

Although Deasismont's fans are typically school children, the album cannot be described as children's music. The style of This Is Me Now is mainly happy pop music with synthesizer backgrounds, but it includes the theme song "Tomorrow" from the musical Annie and a live recording of the song "If I Ain't Got You". The songs in the album were made by the producer team Tysper (Tommy Tysper), Mack (Marcus Sepehrmanesh) and Grizzly (Gustav Jonsson), who are all from Stockholm. They form the core of the production company TEN Production and have produced successful pop tracks before working with Deasismont. Other Ten Production songs seeing popularity were performed by the A Teens and Helena Paparizou. Deasismont's albums were published through Bonnier Amigo Music Group.

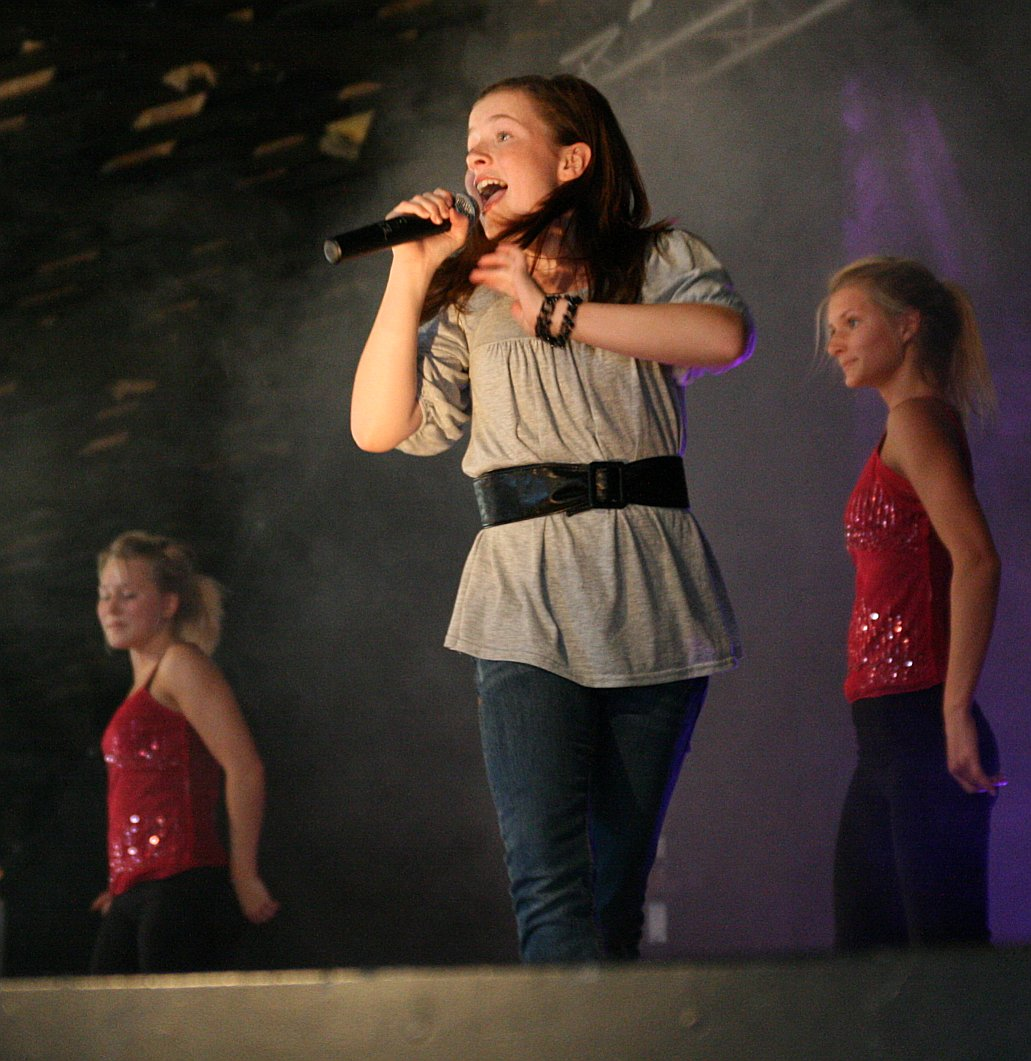
Amy Diamond in Rangsby (Finland) on 14 July 2007

Deasismont is a talented live singer and does not lip sync in her public performances. Her debut album included a live version of Alicia Keys' "If I Ain't Got You", which was described in a review as "sweet and impressive at the same time". She reached the finals in Super Troupers, where she reached the final by singing Shakira's "Underneath Your Clothes". She was 12 years old. A review in Svenska Dagbladet described her voice as fine and secure, and her record label advertised it as "shining and characteristic".

=== Outside Sweden ===
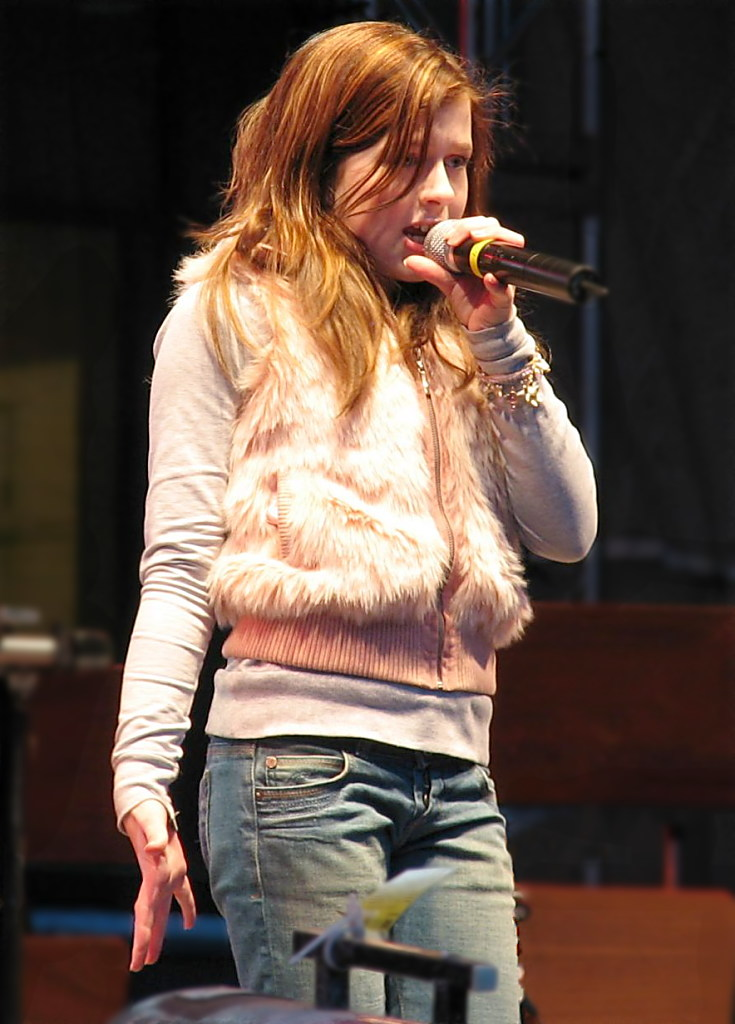
Amy Diamond singing at the opening ceremony of Kamppi shopping center in Helsinki, Finland in 2006

Deasismont signed a distribution deal with Warner in July in order to promote the album internationally. She never appeared with her band again, instead performing with a background track and dancers. The album became popular also in other Nordic countries and Poland during the following summer. "What's in It for Me" was heard frequently on the radio, becoming the 19th most played song of 2005 in Finland and 16th best songs of 2005 in Poland. More singles from the albums "Welcome to the City" and "Champion" were released in the summer. A special edition of the album was released for the Central European market. It contained two previously unreleased songs which would later appear on Still Me Still Now. She was sent on a promotional tour throughout Central Europe in late 2005. Her record deal allowed the whole family to travel with her whenever the concerts were abroad. She performed on television in Germany, Norway, Denmark, Poland, Lithuania and the Netherlands.

Deasismont was nominated for several awards in 2005. At 13, she was the youngest person in history to receive the Nordic Music Award for the best Nordic hit "What's in It for Me". Further, she is the youngest artist to receive two simultaneous NRJ Radio Awards and the youngest to be nominated for the Swedish Grammy Awards. At the Grammy Awards, she won Best Swedish Female Artist, Song of the Year, and Newcomer of the Year. She received a Nickelodeon award for Hit of the Year, and had nominations for the Swedish Rockbjörnen. In 2010 she won again award for the best Swedish music/group at Nickelodeon Kids Choice Awards.

=== Second album ===
Deasismont started recording her second album in February 2006. Her producers sent her songs and she chose which ones she wanted included on the album. The album was recorded over four weekends at a pace of two to three songs per weekend. The album Still Me Still Now was published in May and the first single "Don't Cry Your Heart Out" was released a couple of weeks prior to the general album distribution.

Although not much was heard from her in the spring, the second album was highly anticipated. Two days before the announced release date, she was interviewed on Nyhetsmorgon, a morning talk show, on TV4. The host surprised her by handing her a gold record for the album; it had already sold enough copies on pre-orders alone to be certified. "Don't Cry Your Heart Out" was a radio hit in Sweden.

Still Me Still Now continued in the same style as the previous album, being mostly light-pop music. "Don't Cry Your Heart Out" was radio-friendly pop, but songs such as "Diamonds" and "No Regrets" were arranged in a style reminiscent of musicals. Some reviews wondered about the song selections, but Deasismont's voice was praised nevertheless. The selected songs were alleged by some to be unsuitable for Deasismont and her audience, but her potential was appreciated.

In mid-2006, Deasismont took part in the Diggiloo tour, where she performed, among other songs, Edith Piaf's "Non, je ne regrette rien". Although Still Me Still Now was not as big a success outside Sweden as This Is Me Now, it was still popular in her home country. She also held concerts beyond the Diggiloo tour; readers of the largest evening newspaper, Aftonbladet, voted her 2006 Summer Tour Queen. She released two more singles in late 2006, "Big Guns" and "It Can Only Get Better", and continued to appear on television, including appearances on such prime-time shows as Sommarkrysset, Go'kväll, and Vinterkrysset. In January 2007, she started a fan club that publishes a quarterly fan magazine called Amy Diamond Fanzine. Lastly, in September 2007 she sang "In The Ghetto" on Elvis – The Original Cast.

=== Third album ===
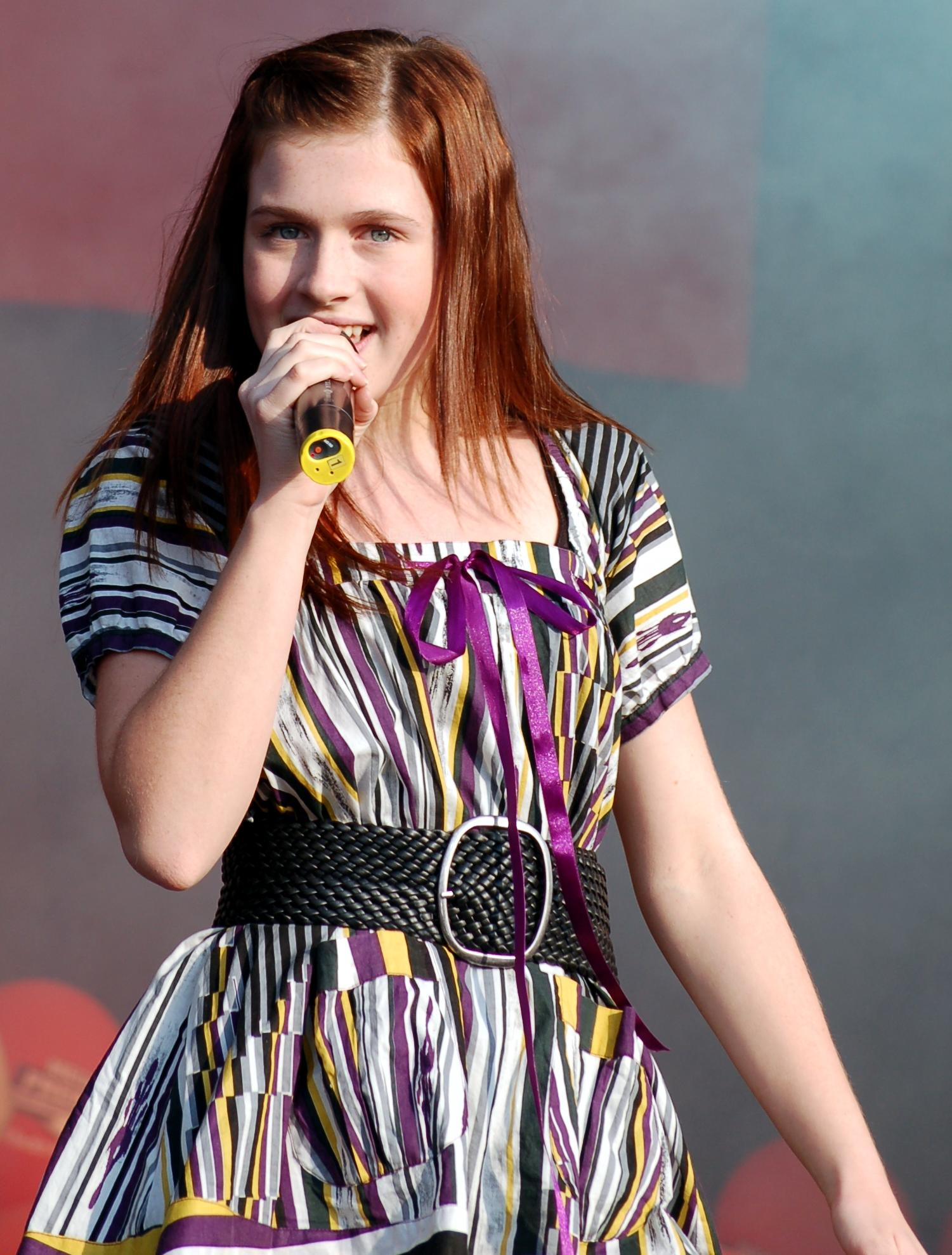
Amy Diamond, 2008

Throughout the second half of 2007, Deasismont recorded her third album, Music in Motion. The album contains tracks done by some renowned producers such as Max Martin and Alexander Kronlund, who previously worked with Britney Spears.

The first single, called "Is It Love?", from the album was released on 26 September 2007. She performed the song on some TV shows like Bobster and Bingolotto, and won "Best Female Artist" at the Nickelodeon Kids Choice Awards. The album was released on 28 November 2007 and her second single "Stay My Baby" (from the new album), written by Max Martin and Tommy Tysper, was released on 23 November.

Deasismont entered Melodifestivalen, the Swedish selection for the Eurovision Song Contest, in February 2008. Her song was called "Thank You", and it earned her 8th place in the final round. The song was later included on the re-release of her album, entitled Music in Motion – Gold Edition. Deasismont received yet another gold disc for this album.

=== Christmas album ===
On 19 November 2008, Deasismont released a Christmas album called En Helt Ny Jul ("A Brand New Christmas"), comprising traditional Swedish Christmas carols. It is described as being a classic style Christmas album, but with a dose of pop. This is her first album sung completely in Swedish. The album went Gold.

=== Melodifestivalen 2009 and fifth album ===
In December 2008 it was confirmed that Deasismont would once again enter the Swedish Song Contest (Melodifestivalen) in 2009, with the electro-pop song "It's My Life" written by Alexander Bard, Bobby Ljunggren and Oscar Holter. On 14 February 2009, she competed in the 2nd semi-final of Melodifestivalen and was nominated to be the first finalist, but eventually lost to H.E.A.T. with "1000 Miles". She was also awarded the international jury's wildcard nomination of the evening. On 7 March, she took part in the second chance round in Norrköping but lost the first knock-out round to Star Pilots with "Higher" and also lost the international jury wildcard to Sofia with "Alla", thus failing to reach the final.

Her fifth album (including the singles "It's My Life", "Up", "Brand New Day" and "Bittersweet") titled Swings and Roundabouts, released in Scandinavia on 21 October, also reached Gold status.

Deasismont was one of seven celebrity choir leaders in the third season of the Swedish TV4 show Körslaget ("Clash of the Choirs"), leading a choir team from her hometown of Jönköping.

From December 2009 to March 2010, she starred as Alice in Alice in Wonderland at the Maxim theatre in Stockholm. It was going to tour Sweden in 2011, but in December 2010 the production company 3Sagas was unable to finance the tour and it was cancelled.

Deasismont is the Swedish voice of the film Princess Lillifee, which premiered in Swedish cinemas on 10 September. She also sings a few songs in the movie.

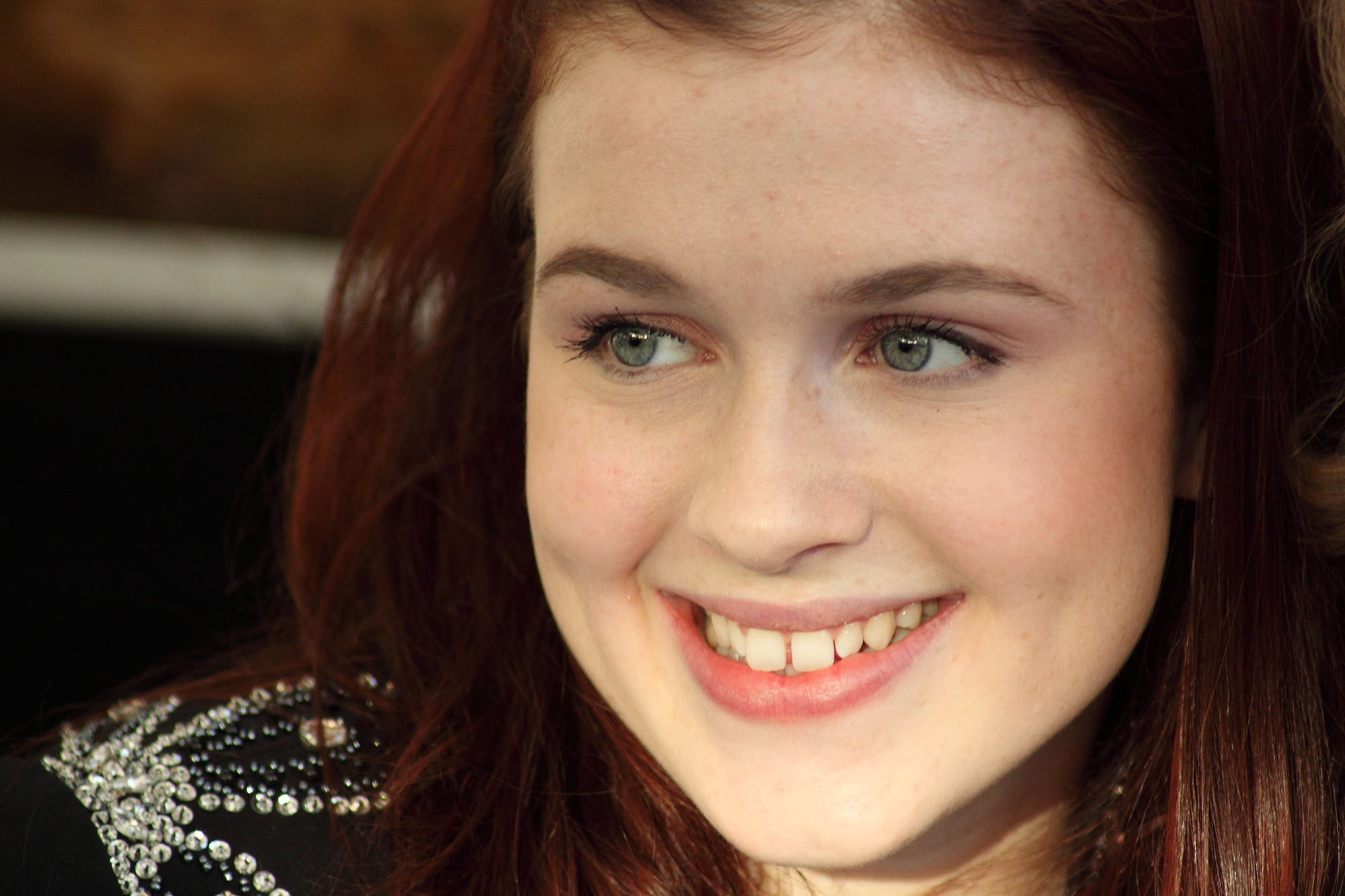
Amy Diamond in Uddevalla, 2010

=== Greatest hits ===
In the spring of 2010, Bonnier Amigo Music Group released information about Deasismont's greatest hits album. The album includes twenty songs from the previous four years as well as four new songs, including covers of Cyndi Lauper's "True Colors", "Only You" by Yazoo and "Perfect" by Fairground Attraction. On 6 September 2010 it was announced the album would be released on 3 November 2010, but at the beginning of October, Bonnier changed the release date to 29 October 2010. On 31 October it was confirmed that she is the youngest Swedish artist to release a greatest hits album.

The first single, "Only You", was released on 24 September 2010.

On 16 October 2010, Deasismont featuring Mikael Rickfors sang a duet version of "True Colors" on the Swedish programme Dansfeber.

On 2 November 2010, she performed "Only You" and "True Colors" on XL Live. The same day, she performed "What's in It for Me" (acoustic version) on Swedish morning programme Rix MorronZoo on radio RIX FM.

At beginning of November the label released information about a new and last single – "True Colors". In December 2010 some radio stations started playing her song "Ready to Fly" as a promo single, but it was not released officially.

=== New music ===
At the end of 2012 Deasismont started working on her new music. For the first time in her career she wrote most of the songs herself. Her new song "Your Love" was released on 16 October 2013. The composers were Deasismont and George Nakas.

In May 2016 Deasismont released a new single called "One" under her real name, Amy Deasismont. In August she released her next single "Forgive". She has since released a third single called "This is How We Party".

== Life outside music ==
Deasismont keeps her private life separate from her singing career. She took the stage name of Amy Diamond when she released her first single, "What's in It for Me". She has said that she chose Diamond because it is her birthstone.

When Deasismont was a child, she rarely missed school, in spite of her music career. According to her, there were promotional jobs only every now and then and most were on weekends. If there were gigs on the weekdays, she did the schoolwork as homework. She has mentioned in interviews that math, PE, and sewing were her favorite subjects in school. She regarded her education as important, as it would allow her to do something else if the music did not work out or if she did not want to sing anymore; she had said that she wanted to sing as long as it was fun. She had mentioned hairdressing as her future dream hobby. Despite her gigs, she had time to have holidays and she said the entertainment business had not been harsh on her. Her manager-father dealt with the business side, and her parents supported her in her career.

In 2006, Deasismont received requests to do print modeling and television work in addition to her musical career. She appeared in a mail-order catalogue for Ellos, and did promotional work for Statoil and the sport store chain Stadium. In December, she appeared as an ice princess on Lassemajas detektivbyrå, a Swedish Christmas series. The show allowed her to demonstrate her figure skating skills. She was the Swedish Spokesperson for the Junior Eurovision Song Contest that year where she gave 12 points to the winners that year (Tolmachevy Sisters with Vesenniy Jazz).

In May 2008, the jewelry maker Tussilagosmycken launched a product called "Amy's Diamond". The piece is made of silver and has a diamond in the middle, and Deasismont's autograph on the back. She has recently done a single for the Barbie CGI feature "Barbie and the Diamond Castle" called "Connected".

In the summer of 2010 she hosted a 2nd season of 16 episodes for the SVT programme Bulldogg. This is a programme where kids can spend time with a dog when their parents do not want any animals in the home. The episode premiered on 16 January 2011 on SVT. In the spring of 2011, Deasismont recorded the third season of 16 Bulldogg.

== Personal life ==
Deasismont was in a relationship with actor Charlie Gustafsson from 2015 to 2022.

== Discography ==
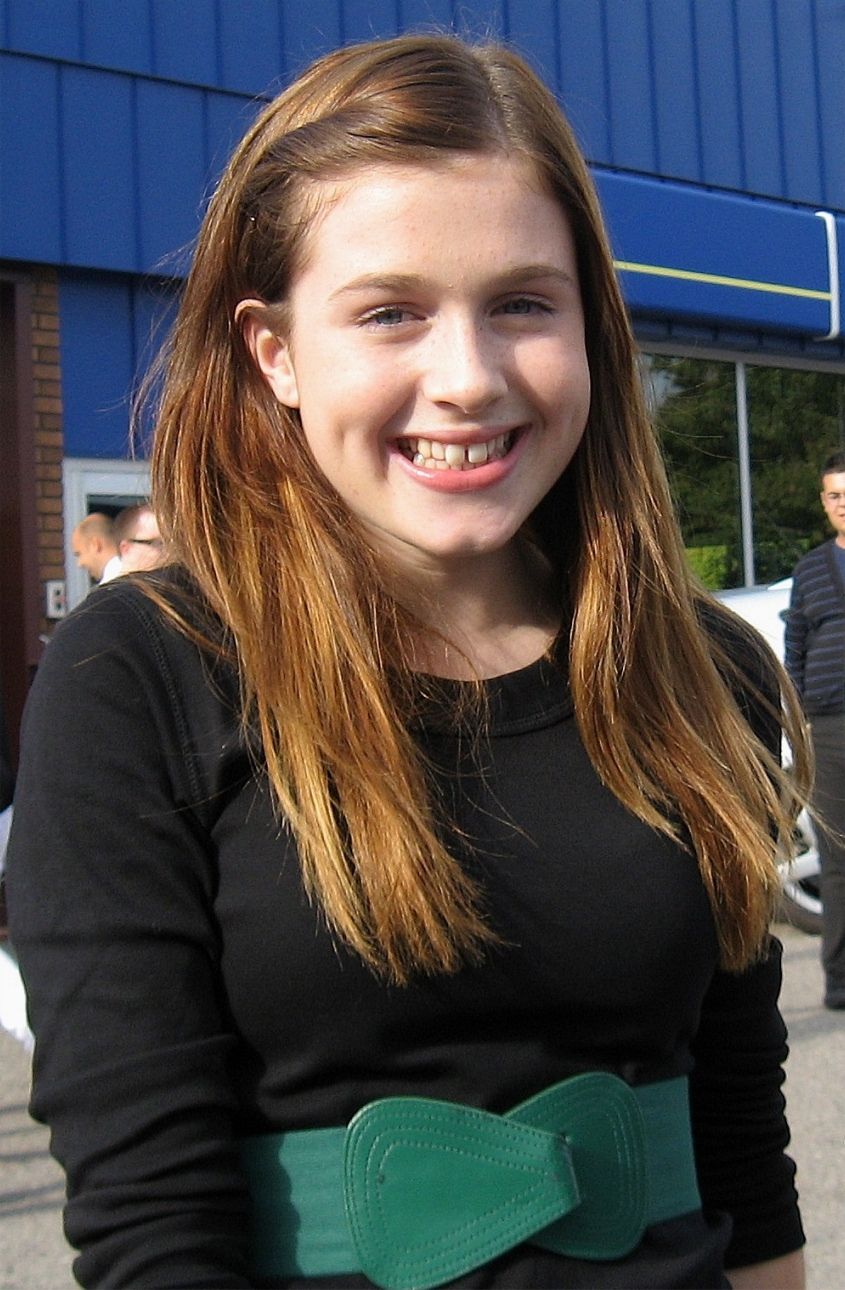
Amy Diamond in September 2008

=== Albums ===
- 2005: This Is Me Now
- 2006: Still Me Still Now
- 2007: Music In Motion
- 2008: Music In Motion (Gold Edition)
- 2008: En Helt Ny Jul
- 2009: Swings And Roundabouts
- 2010: Amy Diamond: Greatest Hits

== Partial filmography ==
- 2003: De Drabbade (small supporting role)
- 2006: Lassemajas Detektivbyrå (supporting role)
- 2010: Prinsessan Lillifee (voice actress, leading role)
- 2012: Prinsessan Lillifee 2: Den Lilla Enhörningen (voice actress, leading role)
- 2012: Modig (Swedish dub, voice actress, leading role)
- 2013: Liv och Maddie (Swedish dub, voice actress, leading role)
- 2015: Min Lilla Syster (major supporting role)
- 2016: Biet Maya (voice actress, leading role)
- 2026: Summer of 1985
